= Losang Thonden =

Tibetan scholar, calligrapher, and author (1942–2018)

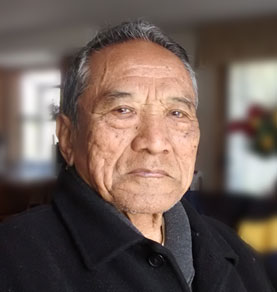
- Born: 23 May 1942; Lhasa, Tibet
- Died: 21 November 2018 (aged 76)
- Known for: Scholar, calligrapher, government official, author
- Spouse: Dekyi Thonden Gyalkhang
- Children: 2

Losang Thonden (23 May 1942 – 21 November 2018) was a Tibetan government official, scholar, calligrapher, and author.

== Early life and education ==
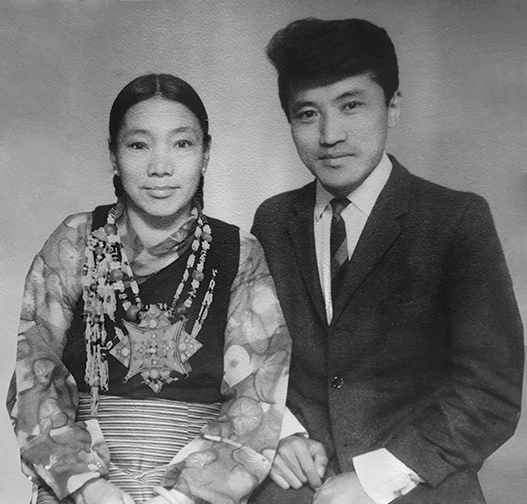
Thonden with his mother Kungchok Dolma Khangsar

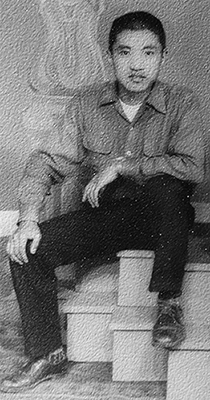
Thonden at age 17

Losang Thonden was born on 23 May 1942, in Lhasa, Tibet, the son of Pasang Tsering Khangsar and Kungchok Dolma. From 1946 to 1957, Thonden attended Jarpakhang High School in Lhasa. His family hired an officer named Darma Bhabu from the Nepalese embassy in Lhasa to teach Thonden English and Nepali, as well as mathematics. He graduated high school at the age of 15. He was then selected among few other students in all of Lhasa by the Tibetan Central Government in conjunction with Beijing government as an elite student ambassador to study at the Beijing University to promote bilateral cultural brotherhood. However, his family, particularly his mother who was a strong Tibetan nationalist, refused that her son to be sent to Communist China. Thonden was disappointed by the objections of his mother and decided that he would go on his own.

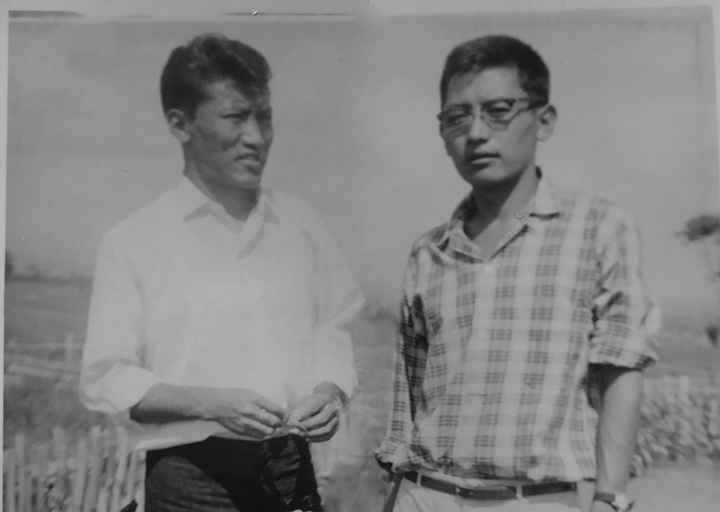
Thonden (left) with his cousin Phunrab Lobsang Dhargyal Drache (Lobsang Dargyal) in South India

Soon after, Thonden's uncle Lobsang Tenzin, the executor of the Ladang Estate, requested that his sister send Thonden to Dakyap JangshupLing Ladang (pronounced Laprang), part of Sera Mey Monastery. Wangdue Khangsar family had been the patron of Sera Mey Monastery for many generations, so Thonden was accepted right away. Dakyap Ladang was north of Lhasa in Penpo region of Tibet. There, he studied under the tutelage of his uncle Dakyap Nawang Losang Yeshi Rinpoche (Dakyap Rinpoche), who was the direct lineage of Ka-dam Geshe Potowa Rinchen Sal.

Later, Thonden attended the non-monastic Sera University to study Tibetan Buddhism, language, and calligraphy under Geshe Lama Tenzin Gyaltsen. In 1959, he escaped from Tibet, after the invasion along with the 14th Dalai Lama. He was separated from his parents and other siblings until they reunited back in India in 1962.

Losang Thonden and his cousin Phunrab Lobsang Dhargyal Drache, both relatives of Dakyap Rinpoche, helped him and his steward Lobsang Khyenrab after they escaped in India in 1959.

When Losang Thonden arrived in India, he was very keen on improving his English language skills, and, with the help of his cousin sister Kesang Yangkyi Takla (former Tibetan Education Minister and Representative of the 14th Dalai Lama in the Office of Tibet London location), he began learning English and later he studied English under a retired British officer, Major Ken in Kalimpong (West Bengal) India.

== Life and career ==
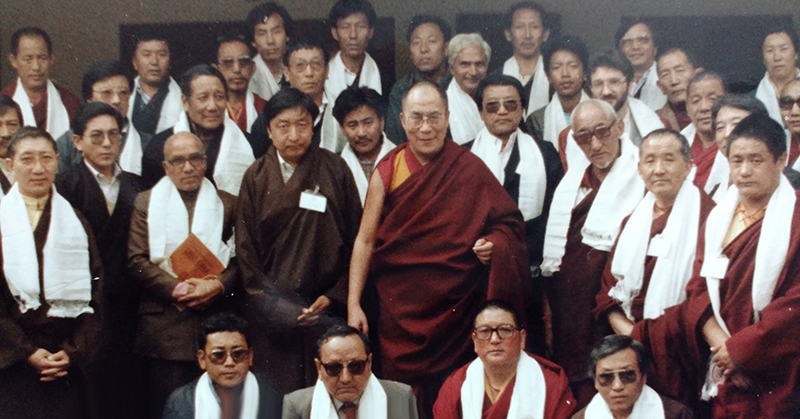
Tibetan Government officials meeting with the Dalai Lama in Dharamsala, India in 1980. Thonden is standing to the right of the Dalai Lama.

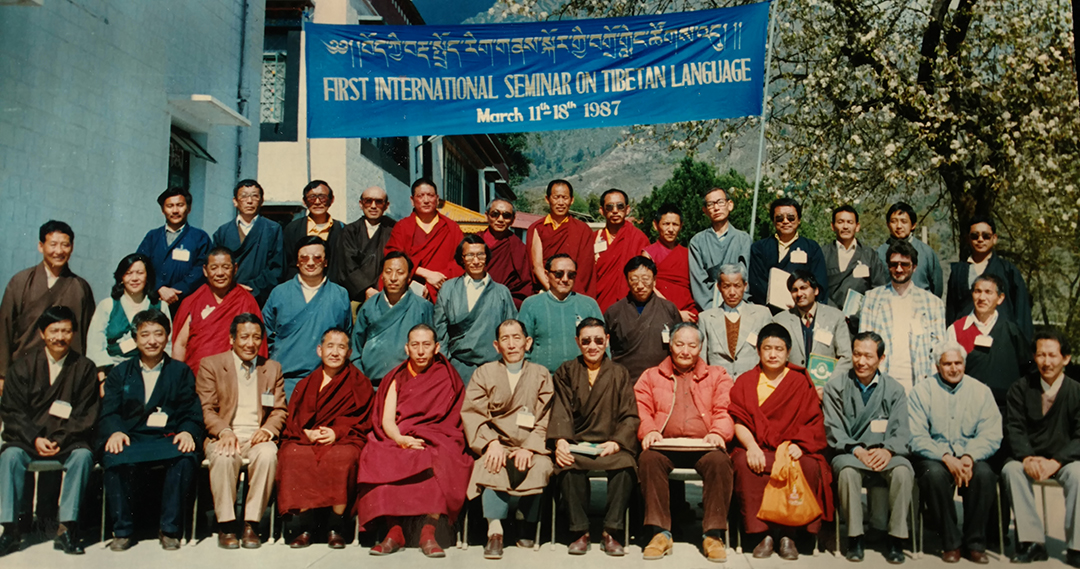
First International Tibetan Language Seminar held in 1987 in Dharmasala, India. Thonden on the right, fourth last row.

=== 1960–1975: Government career and advocacy ===
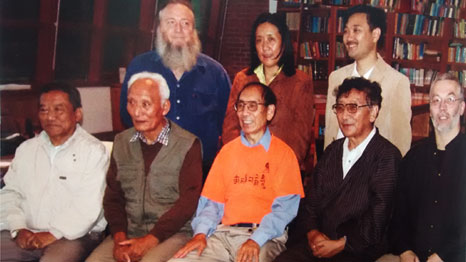
International Conference and Workshop on Tibetan language, literature, and calligraphy. Scholars and experts from India, the United States, France, and Nepal; held in New York City at Trace Foundation's Latse Library of Tibet.

From 1960 to 1963, Thonden served the Council for Tibetan Education and became a prominent member scholar in the Tibetan Literary Committee. He was later selected for the Central Tibetan Administrative for Higher Studies, a joint collaboration with Delhi University. A jumpstart bachelor's degree certification program, for the advancement and education of the upcoming new Tibetan government officials.

In 1963, he was appointed as the Education Officer for the Tibetan Bureau in New Delhi, India.

In 1966, the Council for Tibetan Education asked Thonden to move to Kalakshetra Institute in South India to help with the Tibetan education and planning of curriculum for Tibetan children.

In 1968, at the age of 27, Thonden became one of the youngest Tibetan government officials to be appointed as the Deputy Secretary of Department of Education.

In 1970, he became the Interim Secretary of Department of Education (1970–1975). When his predecessor Barshi Tsedrung Ngawang Tenkyong, who took ill (Secretary of the Department of Education 1961–68) explained newly appointed Secretary Mr. Thonden regarding the challenges faced by the Tibetan schools.

Thonden overhauled and laid the new groundworks for the administrative system of managing a total of 60 Tibetan schools in India, Nepal, Sikkim, and Bhutan that were poorly underrepresented for getting financial grants from the government of India and international sources.

Thonden on many occasions met with Mr. PT. Shyam Narayan, the first Secretary of CTSA (Center for Tibetan School Administration) under the Ministry of Human Resources & Development, Government of India, regarding adequate funding and appointments of qualified teachers in all Tibetan schools. He worked tirelessly to secure funding, sponsorship, and educational scholarship for Tibetan schools so the children attending them would be able to attend major colleges and universities in India and abroad.

He managed to secure many international scholarship programs for the Tibetan refugee students and thus many Tibetan students were sent to technical schools and universities in England, Denmark, France, and Norway.

In 1971, he succeeded in securing full sponsorship and scholarship at the Kimmins High School in Panchgani in the state of Maharashtra, India. This school later became one of the major sponsors for all young Tibetan refugee girls. Till today his initial groundwork has laid the foundation for the younger Tibetan refugee students to get higher education and become model citizens of our society.

In 1973, Thonden was one of the key figures in organizing first ever Tibetan Education Conference in Dharamsala, HP India.

=== 1975–1992: Tibetan language scholar ===
When newly established Library of Tibetan Works and Archives in Dharamshala was formed, they had a dire need of a Tibetan language scholar, and in 1974, Thonden was requested to join as the resident Tibetan Language and Cultural Research Scholar by his then brother-in-law Gyatsho Tshering. Tshering expressed his wishes to the Dalai Lama that Thonden would have far better implementing on academia in promoting and preservation of Tibetan Language and Literature internationally well as towards upcoming younger Tibetan generations and he could fully exercise his Tibetan Language Mastery. In late 1975, the Dalai Lama accepted Thonden's leave from Tibetan Government Administrations.

Thonden was one of the first Tibetan scholars who worked with international language professors and scholars from around the world in bringing standardized Tibetan phonetics in all major European languages. He also helped Professor Ngawang Dhondup Narkyi, Father of the Tibetan Typewriter, to improve the Tibetan Remington Rand typewriter, later manufactured in Kolkata, India. He was an instrumental member in standardizing and implementing the early versions of modern computerized Tibetan Language Unicode for Microsoft Word.

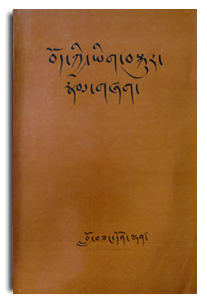
The most popular Tibetan calligraphy and letter writing book

=== Calligraphy ===
Thonden is considered by the Central Tibetan Government one of the few surviving Tibetan language scholars and calligraphers outside of Tibet who is versed in all the Tibetan forms of calligraphy: Uchen, Umi, Druktsa, Horyig, Tsukthun, Yigchun, TsomaQu, and Quk. His calligraphy can be seen in official Tibetan government letterheads, offices, and major libraries in India and New York City.

=== Publications ===
Thonden is an author of several Tibetan Language books. He has translated over 80 western articles and journals for subjects including law, health, and medicine for both the Council for Tibetan Education and the Tibetan Department of Home Affairs.

- Modern Tibetan Language Hardcover, Vol. I, published by LTWA (Library of Tibetan Works and Archives)
- Modern Tibetan Language Hardcover, Vol. II, published by LTWA (Library of Tibetan Works and Archives)
- Modern Tibetan Language Audio, Vol. II, published by LTWA (Library of Tibetan Works and Archives)
- Tibetan Ceremonial Scarf, published by Council for Tibetan Education
- Learning English Language, Vol. I, published by LTWA (Library of Tibetan Works and Archives)
- Learning English Language, Vol. II, published by LTWA (Library of Tibetan Works and Archives)
- Tibetan Calligraphy and Letter Writing, self-published
- Talk Tibetan Today, self-published
- Tibetan Proverbs, self-published
- Ordinary Wisdom, co-authored with John Davenport and published by Wisdom Publications

He had been working on his memoir: a perspective as young Tibetan growing up in Tibet and perspective of Tibetans up till 1959, Tibetan songs and poems, and a Calligraphy book with new Calligraphy designs. Sadly we will never see these books come to fruition.

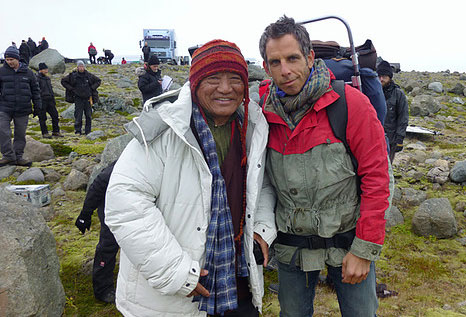
Thonden with actor Ben Stiller on the set of The Secret Life of Walter Mitty in Iceland, 2013

=== 1992–2018: Emigration to the United States and Hollywood appearances ===
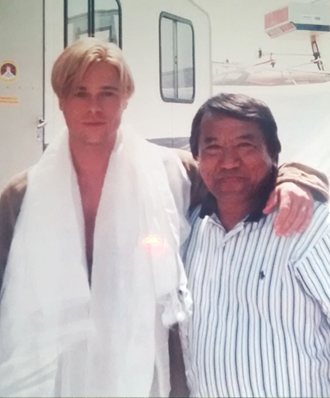
Thonden with actor Brad Pitt on the set of Seven Years In Tibet in Argentina, 1997

In 1992, Thonden immigrated to the United States, where he lived in Seattle, Washington with his wife Dekyi Thonden Gyalkhang (her family was also known as Bhanashol Gyalkhang in Lhasa, Tibet).

As Thonden was exploring new creative avenues, he was introduced to Hollywood in 1995. He was cast in Jean-Jacques Annaud's Seven Years in Tibet and starred as a principal cast in the 20th Century Fox production The Secret Life of Walter Mitty with actor and director Ben Stiller.

He appeared in the documentary film Ten Yaks and Twenty Horns and also acted in a few short films directed by his son Rabyoung Thonden Gyalkhang.

== Death ==
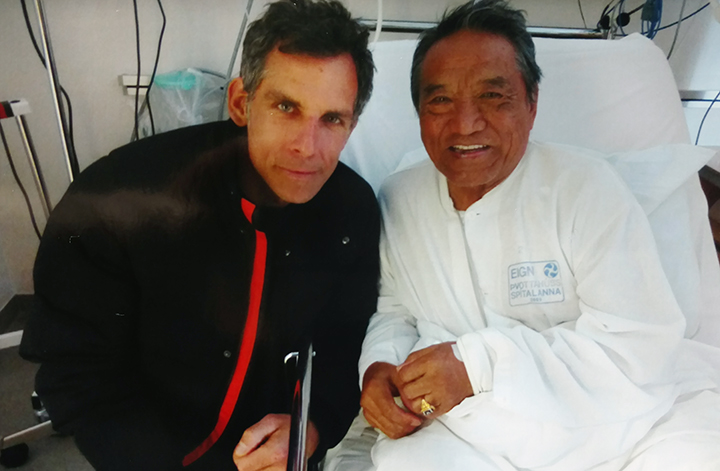
Ben Stiller came to see Thonden when he was admitted to the hospital

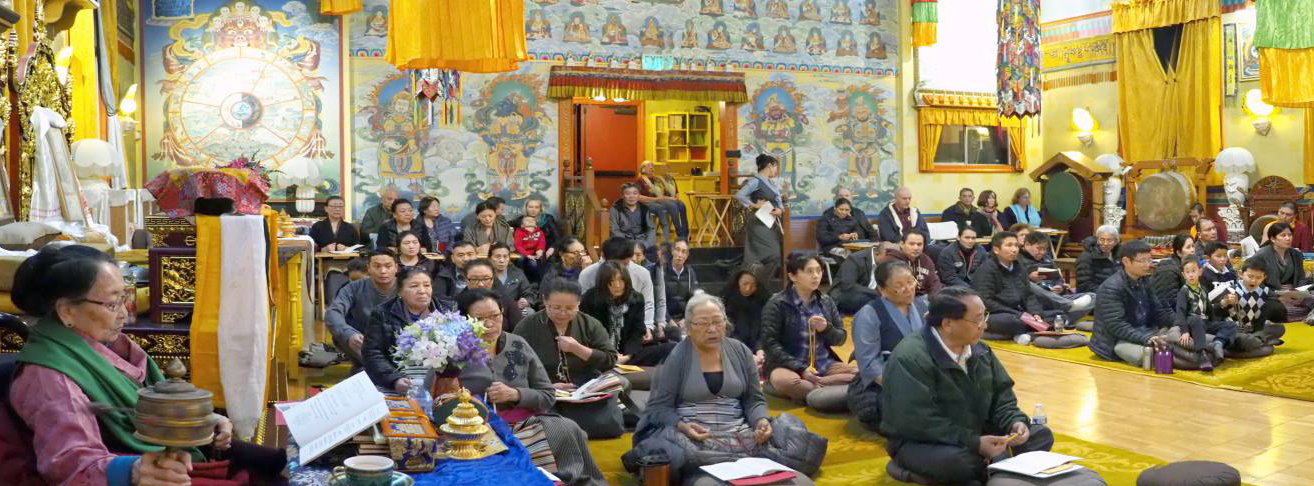
Community prayer service for Thonden at the Sakya Gonpa in Seattle, 24 November 2018

On 21 November 2018, Thonden died after a long battle with cancer. He is survived by his wife Dekyi Thonden Gyalkhang and his two sons Rabgyal Thonden Gyalkhang, and Rabyoung Thonden Gyalkhang.
