= LTWA =

LTWA may refer to:

- List of Title Word Abbreviations, the complete list of ISO 4 standard abbreviations
- Little Tennessee Watershed Association
- Library of Tibetan Works and Archives
