= Brad Pitt =

American actor (born 1963)

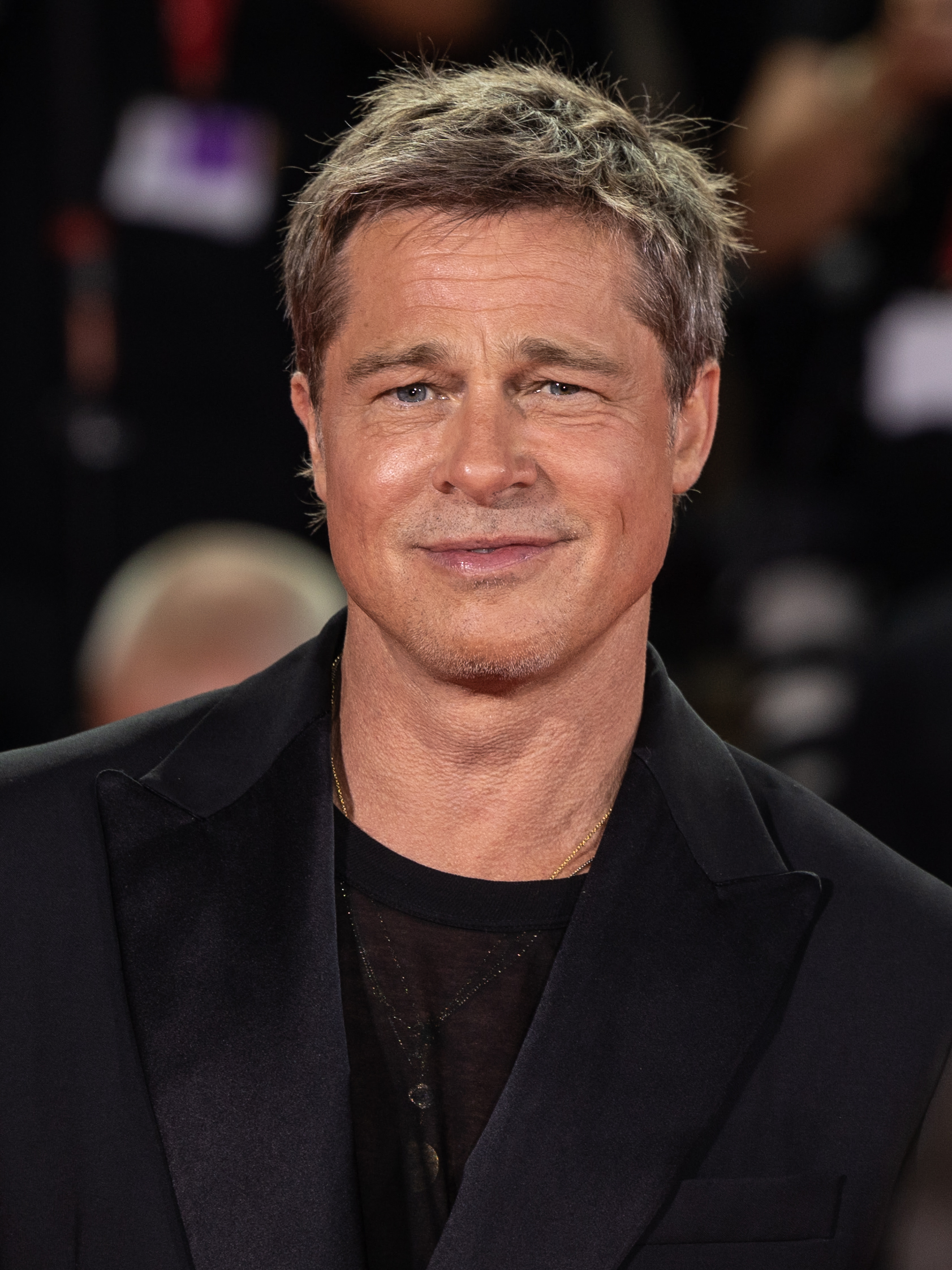
- Pitt in 2024
- Born: William Bradley Pitt; December 18, 1963 (age 62); Shawnee, Oklahoma, U.S.
- Occupations: Actor; film producer
- Years active: 1987–present
- Works: Full list
- Spouses: Jennifer Aniston (m. 2000; div. 2005); Angelina Jolie (m. 2014; div. 2019)
- Children: 6
- Relatives: Doug Pitt (brother)
- Awards: Full list

William Bradley Pitt (born December 18, 1963) is an American actor and film producer. In a film career spanning more than thirty-five years, Pitt has received numerous accolades, including two Academy Awards, two British Academy Film Awards, two Golden Globe Awards, two Primetime Emmy Awards, and one Volpi Cup. His films as a leading actor have grossed over $7.5 billion worldwide.

Pitt first gained recognition as a cowboy hitchhiker in the Ridley Scott road film Thelma & Louise (1991). Pitt emerged as a star taking on leading roles in films such as the drama A River Runs Through It (1992), the western Legends of the Fall (1994), the horror film Interview with the Vampire (1994), the crime thriller Seven (1995), the cult film Fight Club (1999), and the crime comedy Snatch (2000). He cemented his leading man status by starring in blockbusters, such as the Ocean's film trilogy (2001–2007), Troy (2004) and Mr. & Mrs. Smith (2005). His other major successes include Inglourious Basterds (2009), World War Z (2013), Bullet Train (2022) and F1 (2025).

Pitt earned Academy Award nominations for his performances in the science fiction drama 12 Monkeys (1995), the fantasy romance The Curious Case of Benjamin Button (2008) and the sports drama Moneyball (2011). For his portrayal of a stuntman in Quentin Tarantino's Once Upon a Time in Hollywood (2019), he won the Academy Award for Best Supporting Actor, a role which he reprised in The Further Mis-Adventures of Cliff Booth (2026). He also starred in acclaimed films such as Babel (2006), The Assassination of Jesse James by the Coward Robert Ford (2007), Burn After Reading (2008), The Tree of Life (2011), Fury (2014), The Big Short (2015), Ad Astra (2019) and Babylon (2022).

In 2001, Pitt co-founded the production company Plan B Entertainment. As a producer, he won the Academy Award for Best Picture for 12 Years a Slave (2013) and was nominated for Moneyball (2011) and The Big Short (2015). An influential figure in popular culture, Pitt appeared on Forbes' annual Celebrity 100 list from 2006 to 2008, and the Time 100 list in 2007. Regarded as a sex symbol, Pitt was named People's Sexiest Man Alive in 1995 and 2000. Pitt's relationships have been subject to widespread media attention, particularly his marriages to actresses Jennifer Aniston and Angelina Jolie.

== Early life ==
William Bradley Pitt was born on December 18, 1963, in Shawnee, Oklahoma, to William Alvin Pitt, the proprietor of a trucking company, and Jane Etta (née Hillhouse; 1940–2025), a school counselor. The family soon moved to Springfield, Missouri, where Pitt lived with his younger siblings, Doug Pitt (born 1966) and Julie Neal (née Pitt; born 1969). Born into a conservative Christian household, he was raised as Southern Baptist and later "oscillate[d] between agnosticism and atheism". He later returned to a belief "that we're all connected".

Pitt attended Kickapoo High School, where he was a member of the golf, swimming, and tennis teams. He participated in the school's Key and Forensics clubs, in school debates, and in musicals. Pitt enrolled at the University of Missouri in 1982, majoring in journalism with a focus on advertising. As graduation approached, Pitt did not feel ready to settle down. He loved films, and since films were not made in Missouri, he decided to go to where they were made. Two weeks before completing the coursework for a degree, Pitt left the university and moved to Los Angeles, where he took acting lessons and worked odd jobs. He has named Gary Oldman, Sean Penn, and Mickey Rourke as his early acting heroes.

== Career ==
=== Early work (1987–1993) ===
While struggling to establish himself in Los Angeles, Pitt took lessons from acting coach Roy London. His acting career began in 1987, with uncredited roles in the films No Way Out, No Man's Land and Less than Zero. In May of the same year, he made his television debut in a two-episode role on the NBC soap opera Another World. That November, he had guest appearances on the CBS sitcom Trial and Error and the ABC sitcom Growing Pains. He appeared in four episodes of the CBS primetime series Dallas between December 1987 and February 1988 as Randy, the boyfriend of Charlotte (played by Shalane McCall). Later in 1988, Pitt made a guest appearance on the Fox police drama 21 Jump Street and appeared in a Pringles commercial directed by Lawrence Bridges. The same year, he had his first leading film role in the Yugoslavian–American co-production The Dark Side of the Sun, as a young American taken by his family to the Adriatic to find a remedy for a skin condition. The film was shelved at the outbreak of the Croatian War of Independence, and was not released until 1997. Pitt made two film appearances in 1989: the first in a supporting role in the comedy Happy Together, and the second in a major role in the horror film Cutting Class, which was the first of Pitt's films to reach theaters. That year, he made guest appearances on the television series Head of the Class, Freddy's Nightmares, Thirtysomething, and Growing Pains.

Pitt appeared as Billy Canton, a drug addict who takes advantage of a young runaway (played by Juliette Lewis) in the 1990 NBC television film Too Young to Die?, the story of an abused teenager sentenced to death for a murder. Ken Tucker of Entertainment Weekly described Pitt as a "magnificent slimeball" in his role as the "hoody" and "really scary" boyfriend of Lewis' character. The same year, Pitt co-starred in six episodes of the short-lived Fox drama Glory Days and had a supporting role in the HBO television film The Image. His next appearance came in the 1991 film Across the Tracks, in which he portrays Joe Maloney, a high school runner. The same year he featured in a Levi's jeans commercial.

Pitt attracted wider recognition in his supporting role in Ridley Scott's 1991 film Thelma & Louise. He plays J.D., a small-time criminal who befriends Thelma (Geena Davis). His love scene with Davis has been cited as the event that defined Pitt as a sex symbol. Pitt subsequently starred in Johnny Suede (1991) a low-budget film about an aspiring rock star, and the live-action/animated fantasy film Cool World (1992), both of which fared poorly at the box office and with critics.

Pitt appeared as Paul Maclean in the 1992 biographical film A River Runs Through It, directed by Robert Redford. Although Pitt thought his portrayal of Maclean was one of his weakest performances, the Los Angeles Times described it as a career-making performance. Jeff Giles of Rotten Tomatoes said Pitt's portrayal proved he could be more than a "cowboy-hatted hunk." In 1993, Pitt reunited with Juliette Lewis for the road film Kalifornia, playing the serial killer husband of her character. His performance was described by Peter Travers of Rolling Stone as "outstanding, all boyish charm and then a snort that exudes pure menace." Pitt also garnered attention for a brief appearance in the cult hit True Romance as a stoner named Floyd. He finished the year by winning a ShoWest Award for Male Star of Tomorrow.

=== Breakthrough (1994–1998) ===
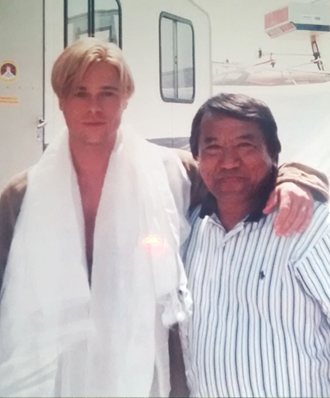
Pitt with Losang Thonden in Argentina on the set of Seven Years in Tibet in 1997

In 1994, Pitt portrayed the vampire Louis de Pointe du Lac in the horror film Interview with the Vampire: The Vampire Chronicles, based on Anne Rice's 1976 novel Interview with the Vampire. Pitt was part of an ensemble cast that included Tom Cruise, Kirsten Dunst, Christian Slater, and Antonio Banderas. Despite winning two MTV Movie Awards at the 1995 ceremony, his performance was poorly received by critics. Matt Zoller Seitz of the Dallas Observer felt Pitt was dull in the role because he failed to display the self-awareness and inner torment necessary for the character.

Pitt next starred in Legends of the Fall (1994), based on the novel Legends of the Fall by Jim Harrison and set in the American West during the first four decades of the twentieth century. He portrays Tristan Ludlow, son of Colonel William Ludlow (Anthony Hopkins). For his performance, Pitt received his first Golden Globe Award nomination, in the Best Actor category. Janet Maslin of The New York Times wrote, "Pitt's diffident mix of acting and attitude works to such heartthrob perfection it's a shame the film's superficiality gets in his way." Although the film received mixed reviews, the Deseret News predicted that Legends of the Fall would solidify Pitt's reputation as a lead actor.

In 1995, Pitt starred alongside Morgan Freeman, Gwyneth Paltrow, and Kevin Spacey in the crime thriller Seven, playing a detective on the trail of a serial killer who preys on people he considers guilty of the Seven Deadly Sins. Pitt said the role would expand his acting horizons, expressing an intention to move on from playing the "pretty boy" to playing someone with flaws." Variety wrote that Pitt did a "determined, energetic, creditable job" in his role, and that his performance "was screen acting at its best". Following the box-office success of Seven, Pitt played the psychotic anarchist Jeffrey Goines in Terry Gilliam's 1995 science fiction film 12 Monkeys. The film received predominantly positive reviews, with Pitt praised in particular. Janet Maslin of The New York Times called Twelve Monkeys "fierce and disturbing" and remarked on Pitt's "startlingly frenzied performance", concluding that he "electrifies Jeffrey with a weird magnetism that becomes important later in the film." He won a Golden Globe Award for Best Supporting Actor for the film and received his first Academy Award nomination for Best Supporting Actor.

The following year, he appeared in the legal drama Sleepers (1996), based on Lorenzo Carcaterra's novel of the same name. The film received mixed reviews. In the 1997 film The Devil's Own Pitt starred, opposite Harrison Ford, as Irish Republican Army terrorist Rory Devany, a role for which he was required to learn an Irish accent. Critical opinion was divided on his accent; "Pitt finds the right tone of moral ambiguity, but at times his Irish brogue is too convincing – it's hard to understand what he's saying", wrote the San Francisco Chronicle. The Charleston Gazette opined that it had favored Pitt's accent over the movie. The Devil's Own grossed $140 million worldwide.

Later that year, he led as Austrian mountaineer Heinrich Harrer in the Jean-Jacques Annaud film Seven Years in Tibet. Pitt trained for months for the role, which demanded significant mountain climbing and trekking practice, including rock climbing in California and the European Alps with his co-star David Thewlis. Pitt had the lead role in 1998's fantasy romance film Meet Joe Black. He portrayed a personification of death inhabiting the body of a young man to learn what it is like to be human. The film received mixed reviews, and many were critical of Pitt's performance. According to Mick LaSalle of the San Francisco Chronicle, Pitt was unable to "make an audience believe that he knows all the mysteries of death and eternity." Roger Ebert remarked, "Pitt is a fine actor, but this performance is a miscalculation."

=== Rise to prominence (1999–2003) ===
In 1999, Pitt portrayed Tyler Durden in Fight Club, a film adaptation of Chuck Palahniuk's novel of the same name, directed by David Fincher. Pitt prepared for the part with lessons in boxing, taekwondo, and grappling. To look the part, Pitt consented to the removal of pieces of his front teeth which were restored when filming ended. While promoting Fight Club, Pitt said that the film explored not taking one's aggressions out on someone else but to "have an experience, take a punch more and see how you come out on the other end." Fight Club premiered at the 1999 Venice International Film Festival. Despite divided critical opinion on the film as a whole, Pitt's performance was widely praised. Paul Clinton of CNN noted the risky yet successful nature of the film, while Variety remarked upon Pitt's ability to be "cool, charismatic and more dynamically physical, perhaps than [...] his breakthrough role in Thelma and Louise". In spite of a worse-than-expected box office performance, Fight Club became a cult classic after its DVD release in 2000.

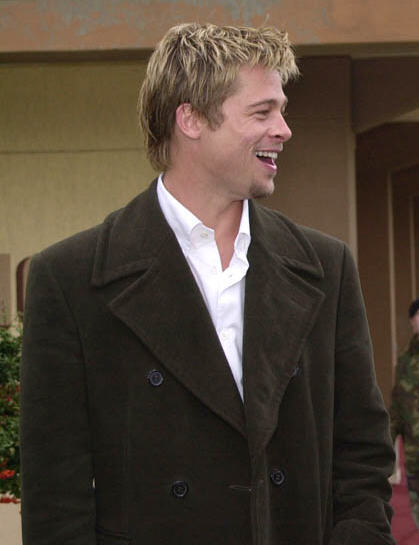
Pitt in 2001

Pitt was cast as an Irish Traveller boxer with a barely intelligible accent in Guy Ritchie's 2000 gangster film Snatch. Several reviewers were critical of Snatch; however, most praised Pitt. Mick LaSalle of the San Francisco Chronicle said Pitt was "ideally cast as an Irishman whose accent is so thick even Brits can't understand him", going on to say that, before Snatch, Pitt had been "shackled by roles that called for brooding introspection, but recently he has found his calling in black comic outrageousness and flashy extroversion;" while Amy Taubin of The Village Voice claimed that "Pitt gets maximum comic mileage out of a one-joke role".

The following year Pitt starred opposite Julia Roberts in the romantic comedy The Mexican, a film that garnered a range of reviews but enjoyed box office success. Pitt's next role, in 2001's $143 million-grossing Cold War thriller Spy Game, was as Tom Bishop, an operative of the CIA's Special Activities Division, mentored by Robert Redford's character. Mark Holcomb of Salon.com enjoyed the film, although he noted that neither Pitt nor Redford provided "much of an emotional connection for the audience".

On November 22, 2001, Pitt made a guest appearance in the eighth season of the television series Friends, playing a man with a grudge against Rachel Green, played by Jennifer Aniston (to whom Pitt was married at the time). For this performance, he was nominated for an Emmy Award. In December 2001, Pitt played Rusty Ryan in the heist film Ocean's Eleven, a remake of the 1960 Rat Pack original. He joined an ensemble cast including George Clooney, Matt Damon, Andy García, and Julia Roberts. Well received by critics, Ocean's Eleven was highly successful at the box office, earning $450 million worldwide.

In February 2002, Pitt appeared in two episodes of MTV's reality series Jackass. In the first, he ran through the streets of Los Angeles with several cast members dressed in gorilla suits, and in a subsequent episode participating in his own staged abduction. In the same year, Pitt had a cameo role in George Clooney's directorial debut Confessions of a Dangerous Mind. He took on his first voice-acting roles in 2003, speaking as the titular character of the DreamWorks animated film Sinbad: Legend of the Seven Seas and playing Boomhauer's brother, Patch, in an episode of the animated television series King of the Hill.

=== Worldwide recognition (2004–2008) ===
Pitt had two major film roles in 2004, starring as Achilles in Troy, and reprising his role, Rusty Ryan, in the sequel Ocean's Twelve. He spent six months sword training before the filming of Troy, based on the Iliad. An on-set injury to his Achilles tendon delayed production on the picture for several weeks. Stephen Hunter of The Washington Post stated that Pitt excelled at such a demanding role. Troy was the first film produced by Plan B Entertainment, a film production company he had founded two years earlier with Jennifer Aniston and Brad Grey, CEO of Paramount Pictures. Ocean's Twelve earned $362 million worldwide, and Pitt and Clooney's dynamic was described by CNN's Paul Clinton as "the best male chemistry since Paul Newman and Robert Redford." In 2005, Pitt starred as John Smith in the Doug Liman-directed action comedy Mr. & Mrs. Smith, in which a bored married couple discover that each is an assassin for a competing agency. The feature received reasonable reviews but was generally lauded for the chemistry between Pitt and Angelina Jolie, who played his character's wife Jane Smith. The Star Tribune noted that "while the story feels haphazard, the movie gets by on gregarious charm, galloping energy and the stars' thermonuclear screen chemistry". Mr. & Mrs. Smith earned $478 million worldwide, making it one of the biggest hits of 2005.

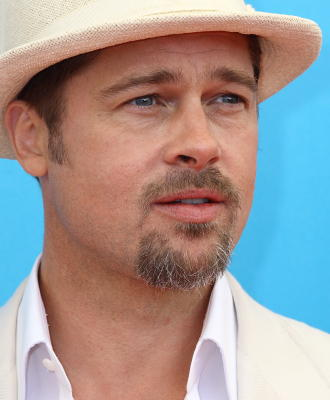
Pitt at the premiere of Burn After Reading in 2008

For his next film, Pitt starred opposite Cate Blanchett in Alejandro González Iñárritu's multi-narrative drama Babel (2006). Pitt's performance was critically well-received, and the Seattle Post-Intelligencer said that he was credible and gave the film visibility. Pitt later said he regarded taking the part as one of the best decisions of his career. The film was screened at a special presentation at the 2006 Cannes Film Festival and was later featured at the 2006 Toronto International Film Festival. Babel received seven Academy Award and Golden Globe nominations, winning the Golden Globe, and earned Pitt a Golden Globe Award for Best Supporting Actor – Motion Picture nomination. That same year, Pitt's company Plan B Entertainment produced The Departed, which won the Academy Award for Best Picture. Pitt was credited on-screen as a producer; however, only Graham King was ruled eligible for the Oscar win.

Reprising his role as Rusty Ryan in a third picture, Pitt starred in 2007's Ocean's Thirteen. While less lucrative than the first two films, this sequel earned $311 million at the international box office. Pitt's next film role was as American outlaw Jesse James in the 2007 Western drama The Assassination of Jesse James by the Coward Robert Ford, adapted from Ron Hansen's 1983 novel of the same name. Directed by Andrew Dominik and produced by Pitt's company Plan B Entertainment, the film premiered at the 2007 Venice Film Festival, with Pitt playing a "scary and charismatic" role, according to Lewis Beale of Film Journal International, and earning Pitt the Volpi Cup award for Best Actor at the 64th Venice International Film Festival. He eventually collected the award one year later at the 2008 festival. As of January 2019, it was his own favorite of his films.

Pitt's next appearance was in the 2008 black comedy Burn After Reading, his first collaboration with the Coen brothers. The film received a positive reception from critics, with The Guardian calling it "a tightly wound, slickly plotted spy comedy", noting that Pitt's performance was one of the funniest. He was later cast as Benjamin Button, the lead in David Fincher's 2008 film The Curious Case of Benjamin Button, a loosely adapted version of a 1921 short story by F. Scott Fitzgerald. The story follows a man who is born an octogenarian and ages in reverse, with Pitt's "sensitive" performance making Benjamin Button a "timeless masterpiece", according to Michael Sragow of The Baltimore Sun. The performance earned Pitt his first Screen Actors Guild Award nomination, as well as a fourth Golden Globe and second Academy Award nomination. The film received 13 Academy Award nominations and grossed $329 million at the box office worldwide.

=== Artistic resurgence and production success (2009–2018) ===
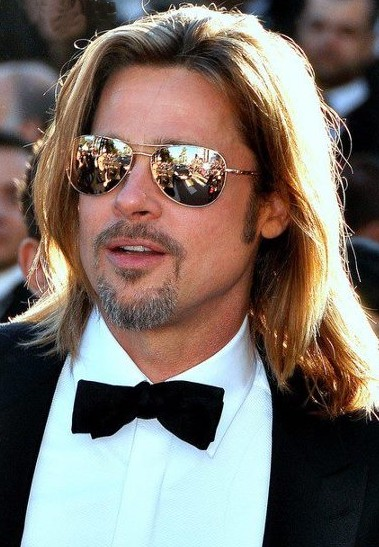
Pitt at the 2012 Cannes Film Festival

Pitt's next leading role came in 2009 with the Quentin Tarantino-directed war film Inglourious Basterds, which premiered at the 2009 Cannes Film Festival. Pitt played Lieutenant Aldo Raine, "The Apache", an American resistance fighter battling Nazis in German-occupied France. The film was a box office hit, taking $311 million worldwide, and garnered generally favorable reviews. The film received multiple awards and nominations, including eight Academy Award nominations and seven MTV Movie Award nominations, including Best Male Performance for Pitt. He next voiced the superhero Metro Man in the 2010 animated feature Megamind. Pitt produced and appeared in Terrence Malick's experimental drama The Tree of Life, co-starring Sean Penn, which won the Palme d'Or at the 2011 Cannes Film Festival. In a performance that attracted strong praise, he portrayed Oakland Athletics general manager Billy Beane in the drama Moneyball, which is based on the 2003 book of the same name written by Michael Lewis. Moneyball received six Academy Award nominations, including Best Picture and Best Actor for Pitt.

His next role was as mob hitman Jackie Cogan in Andrew Dominik's Killing Them Softly (2012), based on the novel Cogan's Trade by George V. Higgins. In 2013, Pitt starred in World War Z, a thriller about a zombie apocalypse, based on Max Brooks's novel of the same name. Pitt also produced the film. World War Z grossed $540 million at the box office worldwide, becoming Pitt's then highest grossing picture, until it was overtaken by F1 in 2025. Next in 2013, he produced, and played a small role in, 12 Years a Slave, a historical drama based on the autobiography of Solomon Northup. The film received critical acclaim and was nominated for nine Academy Awards and won three, including Best Picture. Also in 2013, Pitt had a supporting role in Ridley Scott's The Counselor. Plan B Entertainment landed its first television series on the 2013–2014 schedule, as their joint venture with ABC Studios, the sci-fi/fantasy drama Resurrection, was picked up by ABC.

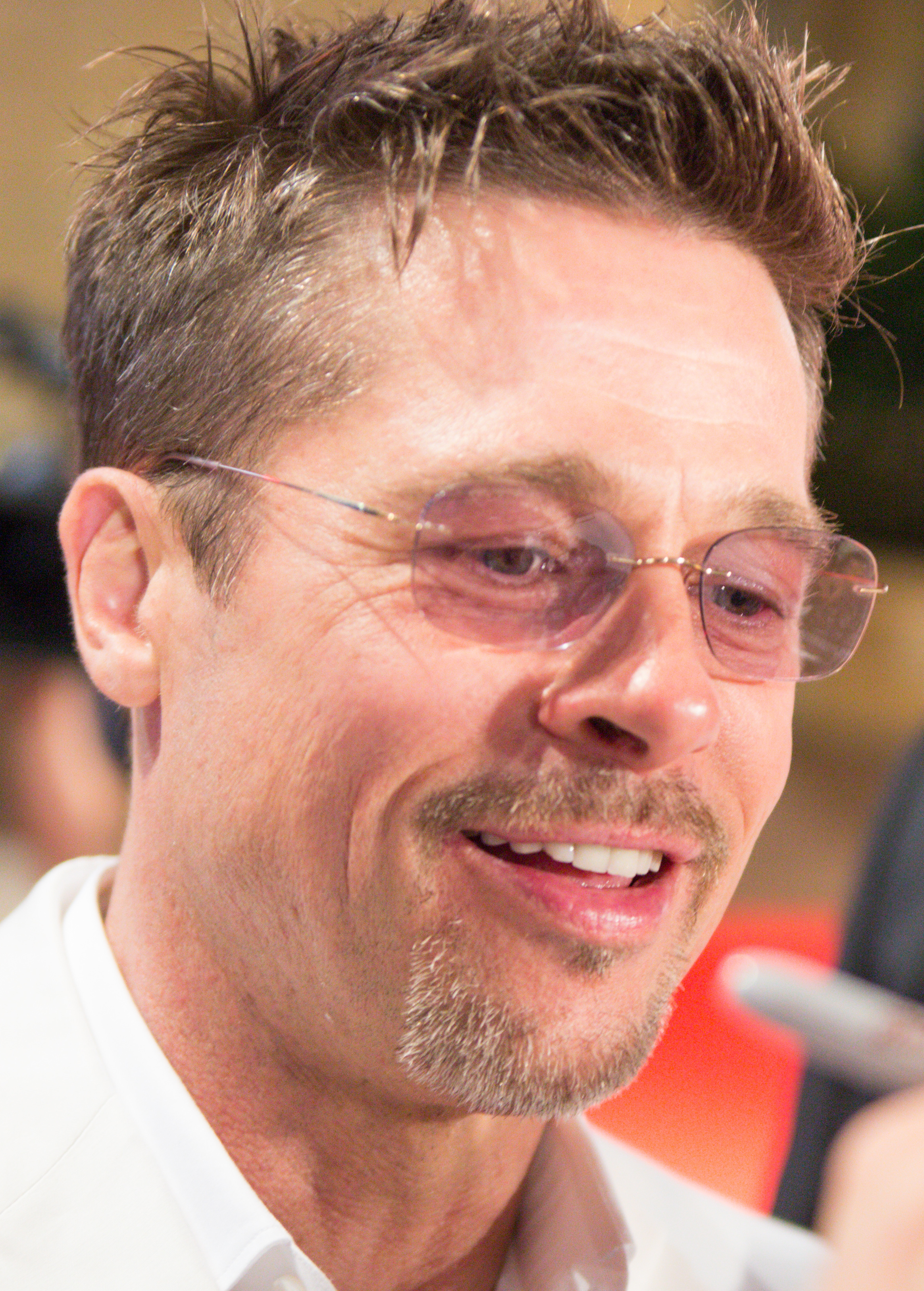
Pitt at the Japan premiere of War Machine in 2017

Pitt starred in Fury, a World War II film directed and written by David Ayer, and co-starring Shia LaBeouf, Logan Lerman, Jon Bernthal, Michael Peña, and Jason Isaacs. The film was released on October 17, 2014. By the end of its run, Fury proved to be a commercial and critical success; it grossed $211 million worldwide and received highly positive reviews from critics.

In 2015, Pitt starred opposite his wife, Jolie, in her third directorial effort, By the Sea, a romantic drama about a marriage in crisis, based on her screenplay. The film was their first collaboration since 2005's Mr. & Mrs. Smith. Pitt's next role came with the biographical comedy-drama The Big Short, which he also produced and also co-starred alongside Christian Bale, Steve Carell, and Ryan Gosling. The film was a commercial and critical success. It went on to gross over $102 million worldwide and received positive reviews from critics. The film was nominated for five Academy Awards, including Best Picture, earning Pitt his third Academy Award nomination as producer. In 2016, Pitt starred in Robert Zemeckis's romantic thriller Allied, in which he plays an assassin who falls in love with a French spy (played by Marion Cotillard) during a mission to kill a German official in World War II. In 2017, he starred in the Netflix satirical war comedy War Machine, which he also produced. Pitt played a recurring role as a weatherman on the late-night talk show The Jim Jefferies Show throughout 2017.

A 2017 sequel to World War Z was announced in 2016, then briefly delayed, then its director confirmed to be David Fincher, and finally shelved because of budget problems.

=== Established legacy (2019–present) ===
Pitt starred as veteran stunt double Cliff Booth opposite Leonardo DiCaprio, in Quentin Tarantino's 2019 film Once Upon a Time in Hollywood, reuniting with DiCaprio after The Departed, which Pitt produced and DiCaprio starred in. For his performance in the film, he won the Academy Award, Golden Globe Award, BAFTA, Screen Actors Guild Award, and Critics' Choice Award. This is the second Oscar for Pitt, his first that he received for acting. In 2019, he also starred in James Gray's deep space epic Ad Astra, in which he played Roy McBride, a space engineer searching the galaxy for his father. Pitt's performance was praised as one of his career-best turn, delivering a performance "that weaponizes passivity into a lethal form of self-defense". In 2020, Pitt portrayed Dr. Anthony Fauci in the cold open on Saturday Night Live, earning him a Primetime Emmy Award for Outstanding Guest Actor in a Comedy Series nomination.

Pitt attending the 74th San Sebastián International Film Festival in September 2026 for the promotion of Heart of the Beast

In 2021, Pitt entered the recording business by creating a company with French record producer Damien Quintard. Set in Pitt's Chateau Miraval in South of France, Miraval Studios re-opened in 2022 after two decades of inactivity. The previous version of the studio was one of the most iconic studios in the world, producing the records for Pink Floyd, the Cranberries, AC/DC, Sade and Muse, among others. In 2022, Pitt starred in Bullet Train, directed by David Leitch, and reunited with his Once Upon a Time in Hollywood co-star Margot Robbie in Babylon, directed by Damien Chazelle. He reteamed with George Clooney in Wolfs, a comedy-thriller written and directed by Jon Watts, which was released in September 2024. In 2025, Pitt produced and starred in the Formula One racing film F1, directed by Joseph Kosinski, for which he earned $30 million. F1 quickly became Apple's biggest hit at the box office, and Pitt's highest-grossing film. In 2026, Pitt portrayed a wandering lost war soldier and dog owner in Heart of the Beast and reprises his role as Cliff Booth in The Further Mis-Adventures of Cliff Booth.

== Acting credits and accolades ==
Over his career, Pitt has received numerous awards including two Academy Awards (as a producer and actor), two BAFTA Awards, two Golden Globe Awards, two Primetime Emmy Awards, and two Screen Actors Guild Awards.

Pitt has been recognized by the Academy of Motion Picture Arts and Sciences for the following performances:

- 68th Academy Awards (1995): Best Supporting Actor, nomination, 12 Monkeys
- 81st Academy Awards (2008): Best Actor, nomination, The Curious Case of Benjamin Button
- 84th Academy Awards (2011): Best Actor, nomination, Moneyball
- 92nd Academy Awards (2019): Best Supporting Actor, win, Once Upon a Time in Hollywood

== Philanthropy and activism ==
Pitt visited the University of Missouri campus in October 2004 to encourage students to vote in the 2004 U.S. presidential election, in which he supported John Kerry. Later in October, he publicly supported the principle of public funding for embryonic stem-cell research. "We have to make sure that we open up these avenues so that our best and our brightest can go find these cures that they believe they will find", he said. In support of this he endorsed Proposition 71, a California ballot initiative intended to provide state government funding for stem-cell research.

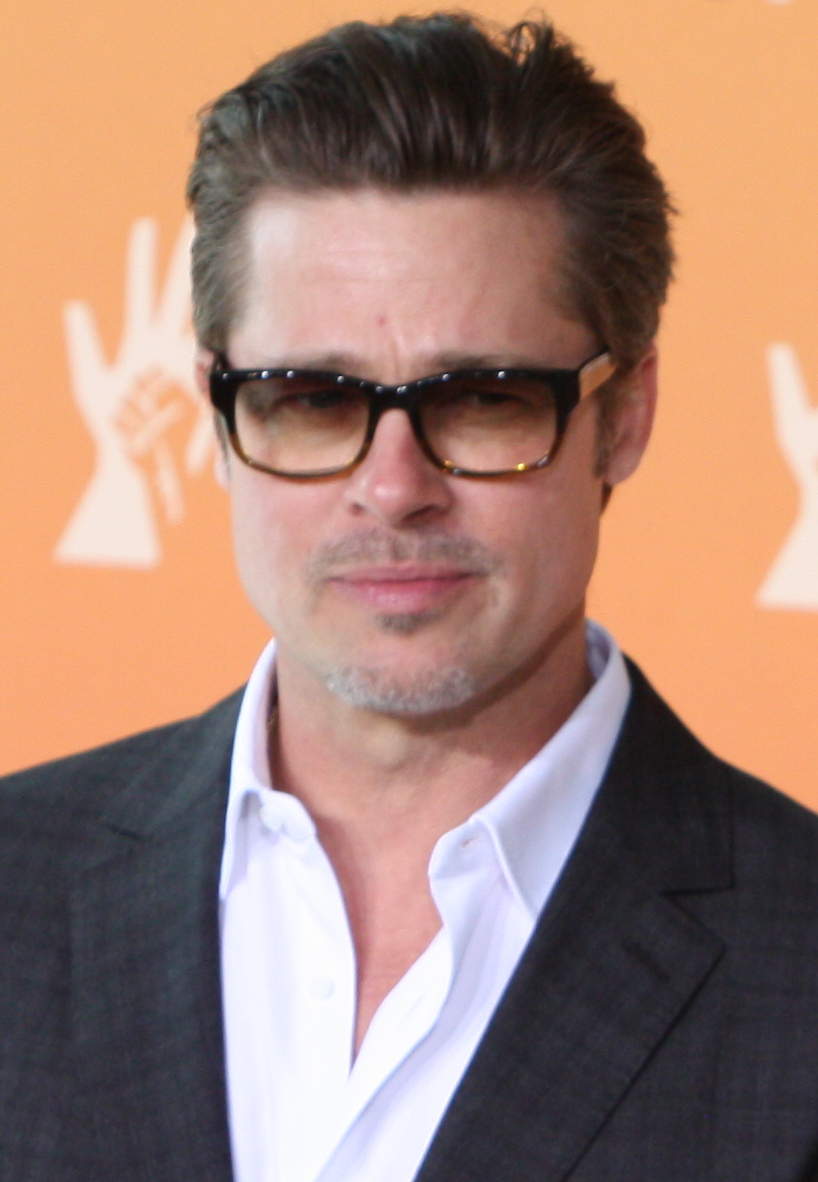
Pitt at the "Global Summit to End Sexual Violence in Conflict" in 2014

Pitt supports One Campaign, an organization aimed at combating AIDS and poverty in the developing world. He narrated the 2005 PBS public television series Rx for Survival: A Global Health Challenge, which discusses current global health issues. The following year Pitt and Jolie flew to Haiti, where they visited a school supported by Yéle Haïti, a charity founded by Haitian-born hip hop musician Wyclef Jean. In May 2007, Pitt and Jolie donated $1 million to three organizations in Chad and Sudan dedicated to those affected by the crisis in the Darfur region. Along with Clooney, Damon, Don Cheadle, David Pressman, and Jerry Weintraub, Pitt is one of the founders of Not On Our Watch, an organization that focuses global attention on stopping "mass atrocities".

Pitt has a sustained interest in architecture, even taking time away from film to study computer-aided design at the Los Angeles offices of renowned architect Frank Gehry. He narrated e2 design, a PBS television series focused on worldwide efforts to build environmentally friendly structures through sustainable architecture and design. In 2000, he co-authored an architectural book on the Blacker House with the architects Thomas A. Heinz and Randell Makinson. In 2006, he founded the Make It Right Foundation, organizing housing professionals in New Orleans to finance and construct 150 sustainable, affordable new houses in New Orleans's Ninth Ward following the devastation caused by Hurricane Katrina.

The project involves 13 architectural firms and the environmental organization Global Green USA, with several of the firms donating their services. Pitt and philanthropist Steve Bing have each committed $5 million in donations. The first six homes were completed in October 2008, and in September 2009 Pitt received an award in recognition of the project from the U.S. Green Building Council, a non-profit trade organization that promotes sustainability in how buildings are designed, built and operated. Pitt met with U.S. President Barack Obama and Speaker of the House of Representatives Nancy Pelosi in March 2009 to promote his concept of green housing as a national model and to discuss federal funding possibilities.

In September 2006, Pitt and Jolie established a charitable organization, the Jolie-Pitt Foundation, to aid humanitarian causes around the world. The foundation made initial donations of $1 million each to Global Action for Children and Doctors Without Borders, followed by an October 2006 donation of $100,000 to the Daniel Pearl Foundation, an organization created in memory of the late American journalist Daniel Pearl. According to federal filings, Pitt and Jolie invested $8.5 million into the foundation in 2006; it gave away $2.4 million in 2006 and $3.4 million in 2007. In June 2009, the Jolie-Pitt Foundation donated $1 million to a U.N. refugee agency to help Pakistanis displaced by fighting between troops and Taliban militants. In January 2010, the foundation donated $1 million to Doctors Without Borders for emergency medical assistance to help victims of the Haiti earthquake.

Pitt is a supporter of same-sex marriage. In an October 2006 interview with Esquire, Pitt said that he would marry Jolie when everyone in America is legally able to marry. In September 2008, he donated $100,000 to the campaign against California's 2008 ballot proposition Proposition 8, an initiative to overturn the state Supreme Court decision that had legalized same-sex marriage. In March 2012, Pitt was featured in a performance of Dustin Lance Black's play, 8 – a staged reenactment of the federal trial that overturned California's Prop 8 ban on same-sex marriage – as Judge Vaughn Walker. In September 2012, Pitt reaffirmed his support for Obama, saying, "I am an Obama supporter and I'm backing his U.S. election campaign." In October 2020, he narrated an advertisement for Joe Biden's 2020 presidential campaign.

== Personal life ==
=== Relationships and marriages ===
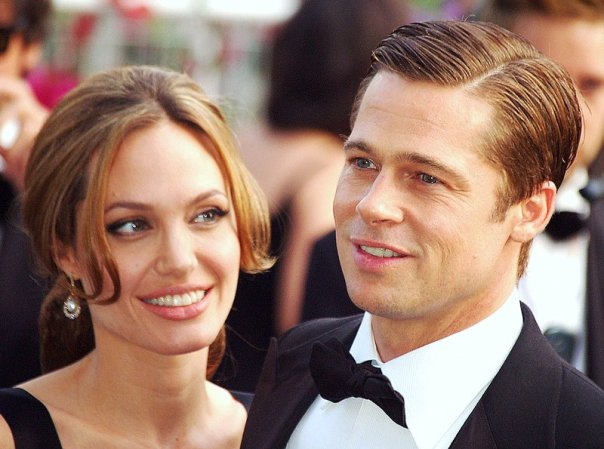
Pitt with his then-partner Angelina Jolie at the 2007 Cannes Film Festival

From the late 1980s to early 1990s, Pitt was romantically involved with several of his co-stars, including Shalane McCall (Dallas), Robin Givens (Head of the Class), Jill Schoelen (Cutting Class), Geena Davis (Thelma & Louise), and Juliette Lewis (Too Young to Die? and Kalifornia). McCall and Lewis were 15 and 17, respectively, when Pitt started dating them. Subsequently, Pitt had a much-publicized romance with, and engagement to, his Seven co-star, Gwyneth Paltrow, whom he dated from 1994 to 1997.

Pitt met actress Jennifer Aniston in 1998; they married in a private wedding ceremony in Malibu on July 29, 2000. In January 2005, Pitt and Aniston announced they had decided to separate. Two months later, Aniston filed for divorce, citing irreconcilable differences. Pitt and Aniston's divorce was finalized by the Los Angeles Superior Court on October 2, 2005. Despite media reports that Pitt and Aniston had an acrimonious relationship, Pitt said in a February 2009 interview that he and Aniston "check in with each other", adding that they were both big parts of each other's lives.

During Pitt's divorce proceedings, his involvement with his Mr. & Mrs. Smith co-star Angelina Jolie attracted media attention. Jolie and Pitt stated that they fell in love on the set and that there was no infidelity. In April 2005, one month after Aniston filed for divorce, a set of paparazzi photographs emerged showing Pitt, Jolie, and her son Maddox at a beach in Kenya; the press interpreted the pictures as evidence of a relationship between Pitt and Jolie. Throughout 2005, the two were seen together with increasing frequency, and the entertainment media dubbed the couple "Brangelina". During the ensuing media circus, shirts with the text "Team Jolie" and "Team Aniston" became a fashion trend. On January 11, 2006, Jolie confirmed to People that she was pregnant with Pitt's child, thereby publicly acknowledging their relationship for the first time. Pitt and Jolie announced their engagement in April 2012 after seven years together. They were legally married on August 14, 2014, and had their wedding in a private ceremony at the Château Miraval, France, on August 23, 2014. On September 19, 2016, Jolie filed for divorce from Pitt, citing irreconcilable differences. On April 12, 2019, the divorce became legal. After Pitt sued Jolie for selling her share of a winery they owned to a third party, she filed a countersuit, in which she alleged that he physically and verbally abused her and their children in an outburst while on a plane in September 2016.

In 2022, he began dating Ines de Ramon (b. 1992), a jewelry executive and the ex-wife of actor Paul Wesley.

=== Children ===
In July 2005, Pitt accompanied Jolie to Addis Ababa, Ethiopia, where she adopted her second child, a girl named Zahara. On December 3, 2005, Pitt was in the process of becoming the adoptive father of Jolie's daughter, and Jolie's first adopted child, a boy named Maddox. On January 19, 2006, a California judge granted Jolie's request to change the children's surnames from "Jolie" to "Jolie-Pitt". The adoptions were finalized soon after.

Jolie gave birth to their daughter Shiloh in Swakopmund, Namibia, on May 27, 2006. Pitt confirmed that she would qualify for a Namibian passport. The couple sold the first pictures of their daughter through the distributor Getty Images; the North American rights were purchased by People for over $4.1 million, while Hello! obtained the British rights for approximately $3.5 million. The proceeds from the sale were donated to charities serving African children. Madame Tussauds in New York unveiled a wax figure of the two-month-old; it marked the first time an infant had been honoured with a statue in the museum.

On March 15, 2007, Jolie adopted a 3-year-old boy, Pax, from an orphanage in Ho Chi Minh City, Vietnam. Pitt adopted the boy in the United States on February 21, 2008. At the Cannes Film Festival in May 2008, Jolie confirmed that she was expecting twins. She gave birth to son and daughter, Knox and Vivienne, on July 12, 2008, in Nice, France. The rights for the first images of the twins were jointly sold to People and Hello! for $14 million—the most expensive celebrity pictures ever taken. The couple donated the proceeds to the Jolie-Pitt Foundation.

Since Jolie filed for divorce from Pitt on September 19, 2016, they have been embroiled in a custody battle over their children. Jolie had full custody until May 2021 when Pitt was granted joint custody, over four and a half years after proceedings began. However, in July, Los Angeles superior court judge John W. Ouderkirk was removed from the case due to concerns over his impartiality as he did not sufficiently disclose business relationships with Pitt's lawyers. This resulted in the custody arrangement reverting to a previous November 2018 agreement where Jolie has primary physical custody while Pitt has "custodial time" with their minor children.

In 2024, Pitt's then 18-year-old second-eldest daughter, and eldest biological child with Jolie, changed her name legally from Shiloh Nouvel Jolie-Pitt to Shiloh Nouvel Jolie. In 2026, Pitt's eldest adopted son and daughter, Maddox Chivan Jolie and Zahara Marley Jolie, and youngest biological daughter, Vivienne Marcheline Jolie, filed paperwork to legally drop Pitt from their last names. With his youngest biological son, Knox Léon Jolie, also no longer using the surname Pitt publicly, Pitt's second-eldest adopted son, Pax Thien Jolie-Pitt, is the only child still using the double-barreled surname.

=== Religion ===
Pitt was raised in a conservative Christian household in Springfield, Missouri, and brought up in the Southern Baptist tradition. He attended church regularly during his childhood but later became critical of organized religion and its doctrines.

He distanced himself from institutional religion in adulthood, and described his beliefs as evolving. He identified at various times as agnostic and atheist, once stating that he was "probably 20 percent atheist and 80 percent agnostic," reflecting skepticism toward traditional religious claims. He stated in later interviews that his earlier atheism was not a fixed position and that his views had continued to change over time. He described his spirituality as personal and experiential rather than tied to any organized religious system.

He has shown interest in spiritual and philosophical traditions associated with Buddhism. His role in the film Seven Years in Tibet (1997) contributed to public discussion of Tibetan Buddhism in Western popular culture, with commentary noting the film's emphasis on Buddhist themes and imagery. He appeared on the cover of an October 1997 issue of Time magazine in a religion-themed issue that referenced Buddhism in connection with his work and public image. He visited a Tokyo Buddhist temple in 2022, and participated in a prayer ritual during the promotion of his film Bullet Train.

=== Abuse allegation ===
In September 2016, the FBI and the Los Angeles Department of Children and Family Services investigated Pitt for child abuse following an incident on a plane, where Pitt was accused by an anonymous person of being "verbally abusive" and "physical" towards one of his children. Pitt was not criminally charged for the incident by the Los Angeles County Department of Children and Family Services, or by the FBI.

In 2022, Jolie filed a countersuit against Pitt during a legal battle over their formerly co-owned vineyard. Jolie's lawyers stated that during negotiations, Pitt had asked Jolie to sign "a nondisclosure agreement prohibiting her from speaking outside of court about his abuse of her and their children." Her complaint stated that he grabbed and shook her during the plane ride, strangled one of their children, and struck another in the face, among other allegations.

=== Alcohol and drug use ===
In September 2016, Pitt got sober and began attending Alcoholics Anonymous meetings. In December 2019, he wrote an article for Interview in which he talked with his Legends of the Fall and Meet Joe Black costar and fellow recovering alcoholic Anthony Hopkins about their experiences with addiction and recovery. Pitt credits fellow actor Bradley Cooper with helping him in his sobriety. In an interview with Esquire in August 2026, Pitt said that he had been sober for seven years before beginning to drink again "in a more restrained manner."

Pitt has admitted to using cannabis in the late 1990s as a way to deal with his increasing fame. According to Pitt: "I was hiding out from the celebrity thing; I was smoking way too much dope; I was sitting on the couch and just turning into a doughnut." He reduced his cannabis use and focused on his work after a trip to Morocco, where he witnessed extreme poverty and suffering.

=== Face blindness ===
In 2022, Pitt said that he had struggled for years to recognize people's faces due to prosopagnosia (face blindness), for which he has not been formally diagnosed. In a 2013 interview, he said that his inability to recognize people's faces had become so severe that he often wanted to stay home.

=== Artwork ===
Pitt has an interest in art, learned pottery, and has created sculptures. Nine of his sculptures were exhibited together with works by musician Nick Cave and artist Thomas Houseago at the Sara Hildén Art Museum in Tampere, Finland, in 2022 and 2023.

=== Business ventures ===
In 2022, Pitt co-founded the skincare products company Beau Domaine.

== Public image ==
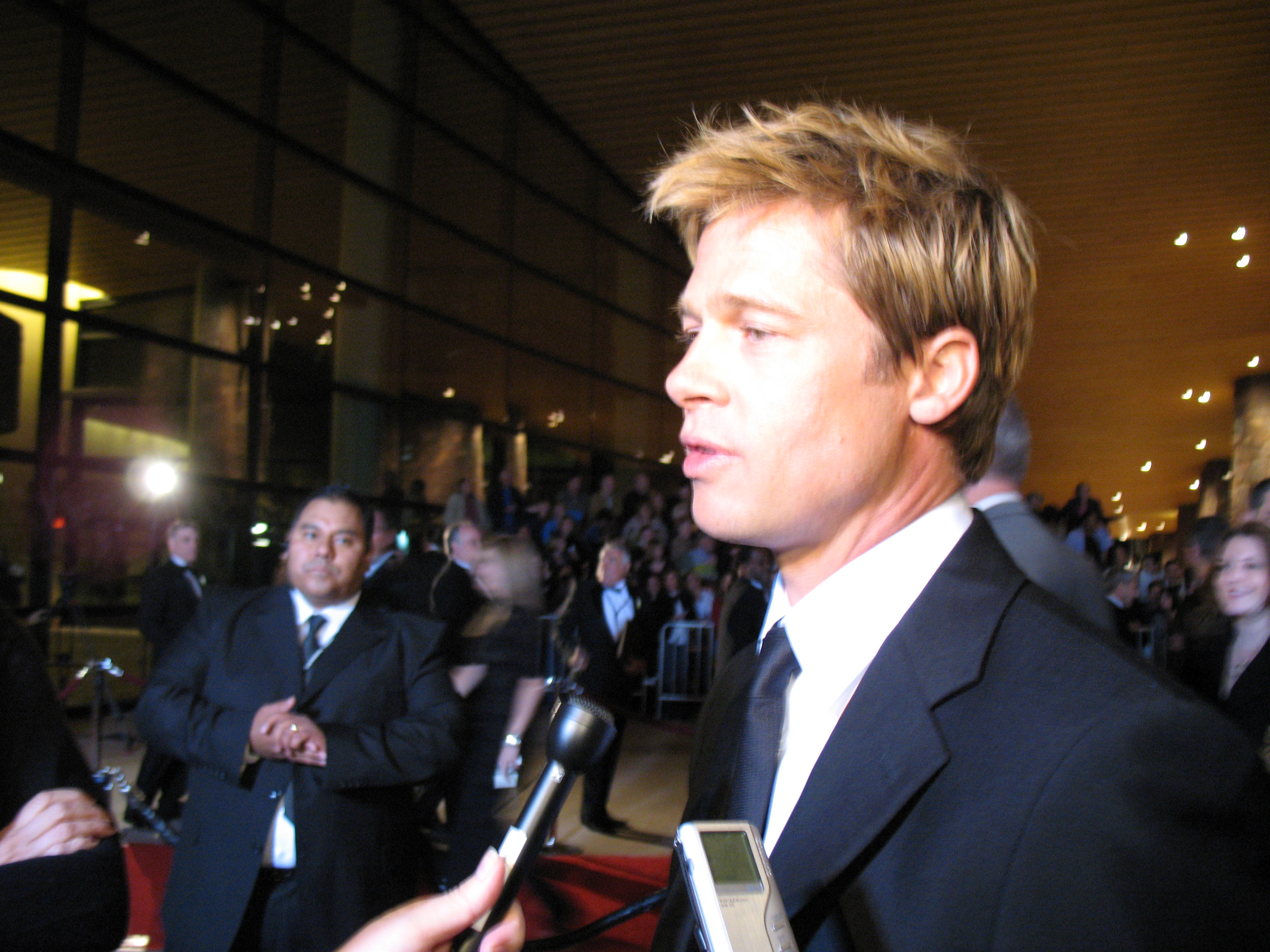
Pitt at the 2007 Palm Springs International Film Festival

Pitt has been frequently cited as one of the most attractive actors of all time and has been described as a sex symbol by many sources, including Empire, who named him one of the 25 sexiest stars in film history in 1995. The same year, he was named People's Sexiest Man Alive, an accolade he received again in 2000. Pitt appeared on Forbes' annual Celebrity 100 list of the 100 most powerful celebrities from 2006 to 2008 placing at numbers 20, 5 and 10, respectively. In 2007, he appeared on the Time 100 list, a compilation of the 100 most influential people in the world, as selected annually by Time magazine. The magazine credited Pitt for using "his star power to get people to look at places and stories that cameras don't usually catch". He was again included on the Time 100 in 2009, this time in the "Builders and Titans" list. As of 2025, Pitt's films have grossed over $7.5 billion worldwide, according to The Numbers.

Beginning in 2005, Pitt's relationship with Angelina Jolie became one of the world's most reported celebrity stories. After Jolie was confirmed to be pregnant in early 2006, the intense media hype surrounding the couple reached what Reuters, in a story titled "The Brangelina fever," called "the point of insanity". To avoid media attention, the couple flew to Namibia for the birth of their daughter, which was described by a paparazzi blog as "the most anticipated baby since Jesus Christ." Similarly, intense media interest greeted the announcement of Jolie's second pregnancy two years later; for the two weeks Jolie spent in a seaside hospital in Nice, reporters and photographers camped outside on the promenade to report on the birth.

In a 2006 global industry survey by ACNielsen in 42 international markets, Pitt, together with Jolie, were found to be the favorite celebrity endorsers for brands and products worldwide. Pitt has appeared in several television commercials. For the U.S. market, he starred in a Heineken commercial aired during the 2005 Super Bowl; it was directed by David Fincher, who had directed Pitt in Seven and Fight Club. Other commercial appearances came in television spots including Acura Integra, in which he was featured opposite Russian model Tatiana Sorokko, as well as SoftBank, and Edwin Jeans. On June 2, 2015, the minor planet 29132 Bradpitt was named in his honor.

Pitt does not use social media and has no accounts on any social media platform.
