= Doboom Tulku =

Tibetan lama, scholar and writer

Lama Doboom Tulku Rinpoche
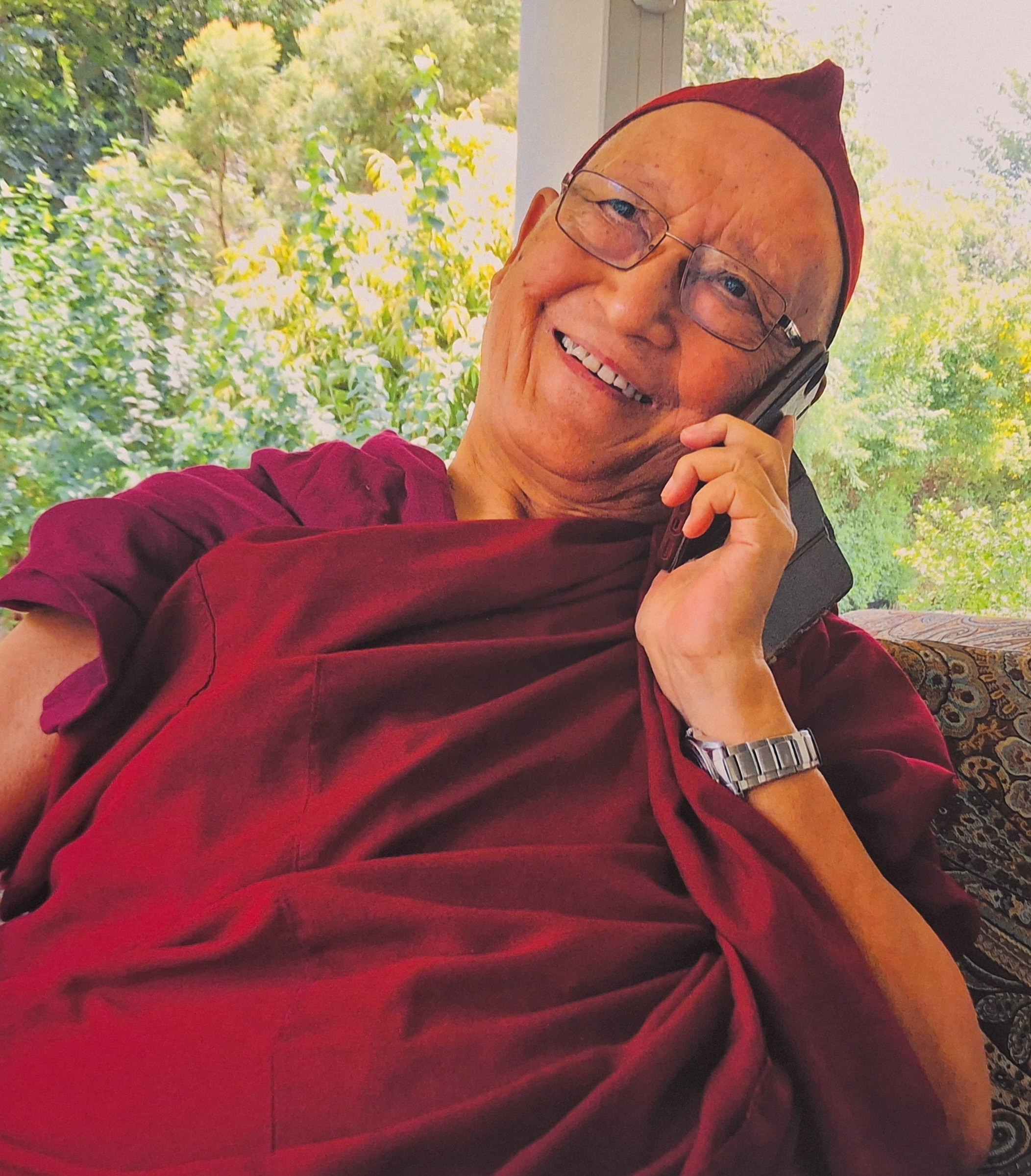
- Doboom Lozang Tenzin Tulku
- Born: February 17, 1942; Kham Region, Tibet
- Died: January 29, 2024 (aged 81); Mundgod, Karnataka, India
- Other names: Doboom Lozang Tenzin Tulku
- Education: Bhikkhu, Geshe Archarya, Honorary Doctorate
- Alma mater: Tashi Dhargye Monastery, Drepung Monastery, Central Institute of Higher Tibetan Studies, Mahachulalongkornrajavidyalaya University
- Occupations: Tibetan Lama, Librarian, Speaker, Author, Scholar, Institution Builder
- Years active: 1944-2024
- Employer(s): Dalai Lama, Tibet House, World Buddhist Culture Trust, Drepung Monastery
- Known for: Monastic dialogue seminars, Annual Padmapani Lecture, World Festival of Sacred Music
- Notable work: Taken Away: The Ordinary Life of a Lama, The Buddhist Path to Enlightenment: Tibetan Buddhist Philosophy and Practice, Pramana: Dharmakirti and The Indian Philosophical Debate
- Title: Tulku
- Website: wbct.org/fmt.html

Lama Doboom Tulku Rinpoche (17 February 1942 – 29 January 2024) was a scholar and creative writer. He served as Director of Tibet House (1981–2011), Founder and Managing Trustee of World Buddhist Culture Trust (1996–2023) and as an organizer of the World Festival of Sacred Music (1999–2000).

== Early life and education ==
Tulku was born in 1942 in a nomadic settlement in Kham region of Tibet. As a child he was taken to the Tashi Dhargye Monastery in Tehor, Kham province after was recognised as the reincarnation of the previous Doboom Tulku at the age of two by Phurchog Jampa Rinpoche. In his memoirs he describes growing up with ordinary children, but from the age of 10 he was entrusted with presiding over the Monlam and Tscogchod festivals at Tashi Dhargye. At the age of 12, he joined Drepung Monastery in Central Tibet and studied Buddhist philosophy.

In March 1959, as the Chinese regiments approached Lhasa, he and his entourage made their way to India, where he stayed at the lama camp at Buxa Duar, West Bengal and continued his studies. In 1963, he received his bhikkhu ordination from the Dalai Lama. The Dalai Lama later described him as his "best friend" to the Tibetologist Linnart Mäll.

In 1969, he entered the Central Institute of Higher Tibetan Studies, then under the auspices of Sanskrit University, Varanasi, where he studied Buddhist philosophy, developing a special interest in Madhyamika philosophy. He received Geshe Archarya degree in 1972.

In 1999, he was awarded an honorary doctorate degree in Buddhist Studies by Mahachulalongkornrajavidyalaya University, Buddhist University of Bangkok.

== Work and important positions ==
=== Working with Dalai Lama ===
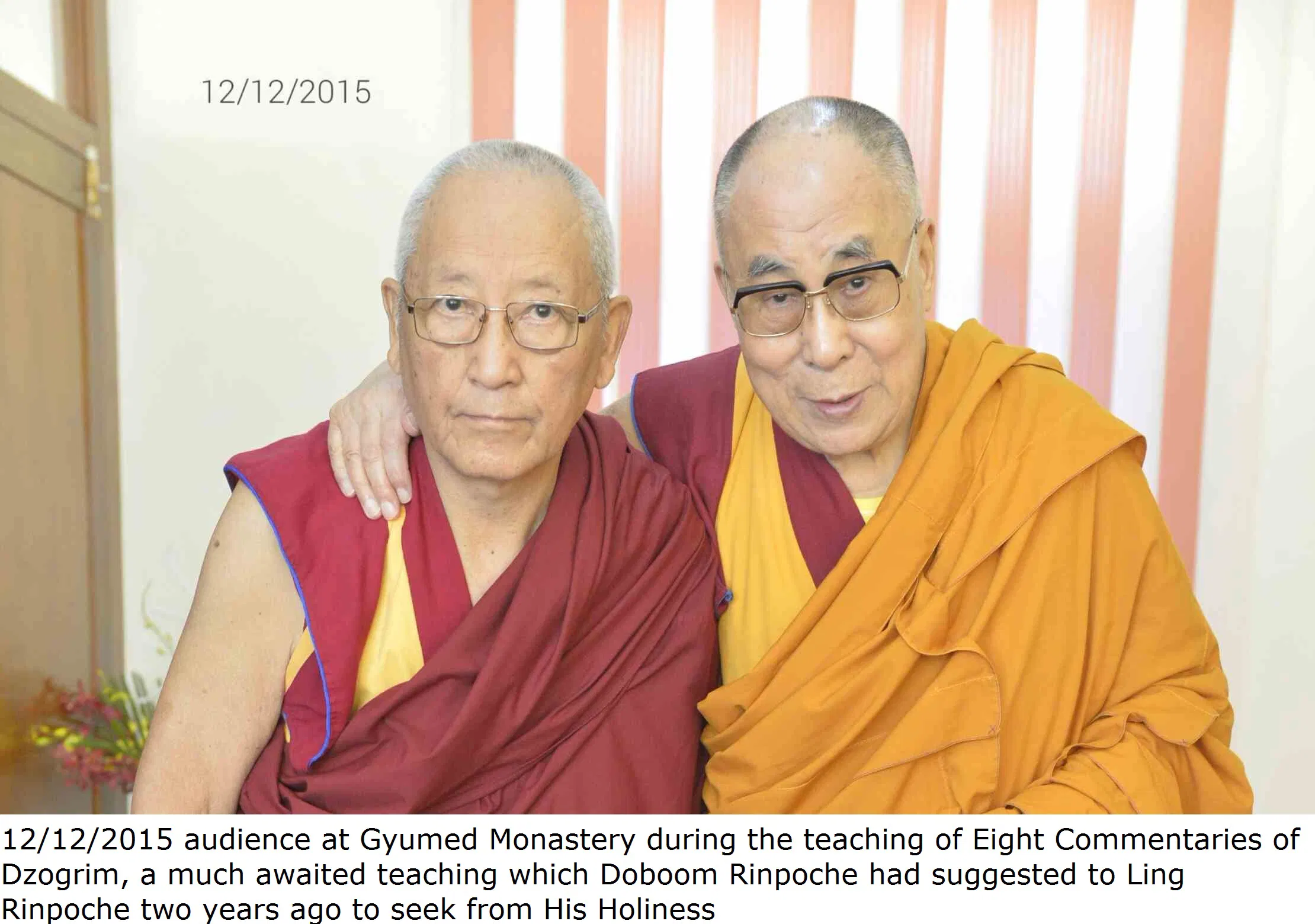
HH Dalai Lama with Lama Doboom Tulku Rinpoche

He joined Tibet House, New Delhi, as librarian in 1972, and the Library of Tibetan Works and Archives, Dharamsala, in 1973. From 1976 to 1980, he worked at His Holiness the Dalai Lama’s Private Office, accompanying him on visits to the USA, USSR, Japan and Mongolia.

In 1981, he was asked to serve as Director of Tibet House, New Delhi, and develop programmes to promote the cultural heritage of Tibet. Here he oversaw the installation of a Buddha statue at the Buddha Jayanti Park in Delhi. This park got its name in 1956, when His Holiness Dalai Lama and the Panchen Lama visited India on the occasion of the 2,500th anniversary of the Buddha’s parinirvana.

=== Lectures and Seminars ===
In 1986, he initiated the monastic dialogue seminars, to acquaint traditional Tibetan scholars with the Indian academic system, and to expose Indian scholars to the Tibetan tradition. Eight seminars were conducted till 2008, on subjects like Buddhist logic, Abhidhamma and pramana.

In 1989, he initiated the annual Padmapani Lecture, to be delivered by experts on Tibetan and Buddhist studies.

=== World Festival of Sacred Music ===
In 1996, he conceived the World Festival of Sacred Music, and persuaded former president of India, R. Venkataraman to be chairperson, and Pandit Ravi Shankar, Lord Yehudi Menuhin, Prince Sadruddin Aga Khan, Václav Havel, Archbishop Desmond Tutu, Swami Chidananda Saraswati and Madame Danielle Mitterand to be patrons. The festival was celebrated in 15 cities across the world. At the main event in Bangalore on April 9–16, 2000, 650 artists from 15 countries participated, Benedictines from the Netherlands, Gamelan players from Indonesia, Baul minstrels, qawwali singers, the Zulu band ‘Spear of Shaka’, the Israeli shofar and Mongolian shamanic drums.

== Books and publications ==
=== Books ===
Doboom Tulku was a distinguished Tibetan Buddhist scholar and writer, whose works span a range of subjects including spirituality, philosophy, and personal reflections on monastic life. His writings often delve into the intricate teachings of Buddhist philosophy, offering readers insights into the practice of mindfulness, compassion, and the path to enlightenment. His memoirs reflect on monastic organisation, the teachings of different sects at his monastery Drepung, and the building of institutions in India. They also include his observations on figures like E. Gene Smith, Krishnanath, Ramachandra Gandhi, Marina Abramovic, and Archbishop Desmond Tutu.

- Taken Away: The Ordinary Life of a Lama | Doboom Tulku and Sudhamahi Regunathan, Bloomsbury, ISBN 9789356408821.
- Buddhist Translations: Problems and Perspectives | Manohar, 2020, ISBN 9789388540902.
- The Buddhist Path to Enlightenment: Tibetan Buddhist Philosophy and Practice | ISBN 8177692496.
- Pramana: Dharmakirti and The Indian Philosophical Debate | Doboom Tulku and Maya Joshi, Manohar Publishers & Distributors, 2010, ISBN 9788173048555.

=== Articles ===
Daboom Tulku is a prominent columnist recognised for his insightful writings in the "Speaking Tree" section of the Times of India. His work frequently delves into themes of spirituality, compassion, and mindfulness, reflecting his profound understanding of Buddhist philosophy.

- "Music Dissolves All Divisions": Tulku discusses how music can transcend cultural and social barriers, promoting unity and understanding among diverse groups.
- "A Generosity of Spirit": In this piece, he highlights the importance of generosity and its positive impact on both the giver and receiver.
- "Get Rid of All Aggression": Tulku offers guidance on eliminating aggression from one's life, promoting a peaceful and harmonious existence.
- "Compassion for All Life": This article emphasizes the importance of compassion towards all living beings, advocating for a more humane world.
- "Mango as Spiritual Guide": Using the metaphor of a mango, Tulku illustrates spiritual lessons and personal growth.
- "Should I Change My Faith": He explores the question of faith, focusing on the personal journey of spiritual exploration.
- "Devotion Versus Intellect": This article contrasts the roles of devotion and intellect in spiritual practice, advocating for a balanced approach.
- "Bodyguard and Mindguard": Tulku emphasizes the importance of protecting both the body and mind from negative influences.
- "Be Mindful in All You Do": He advocates for the practice of mindfulness in daily activities to achieve a more centered and peaceful life.
- "The Trinity Principle": This piece explores the concept of the trinity in various spiritual traditions and its relevance to personal growth.
- "Non-Violence is a Vibrant Way of Life": This article promotes non-violence as an active and dynamic way of living.
- "Get Inspired by the Moon": Tulku encourages readers to find inspiration and lessons in the natural world, drawing from the beauty of the moon.
- "Not to Argue and Win but to Know and Be Known": He discusses the value of dialogue and understanding over winning arguments, promoting mutual respect and learning.
- "Purpose of life is to be useful to others": He emphasises the importance of understanding the impact 'Being Useful' can create in and around our lives. When we contribute to the wellbeing of others, this creates trust in relationships with people. The same applies to interactions with animals.
