= Doug Pitt =

American businessman (born 1966)

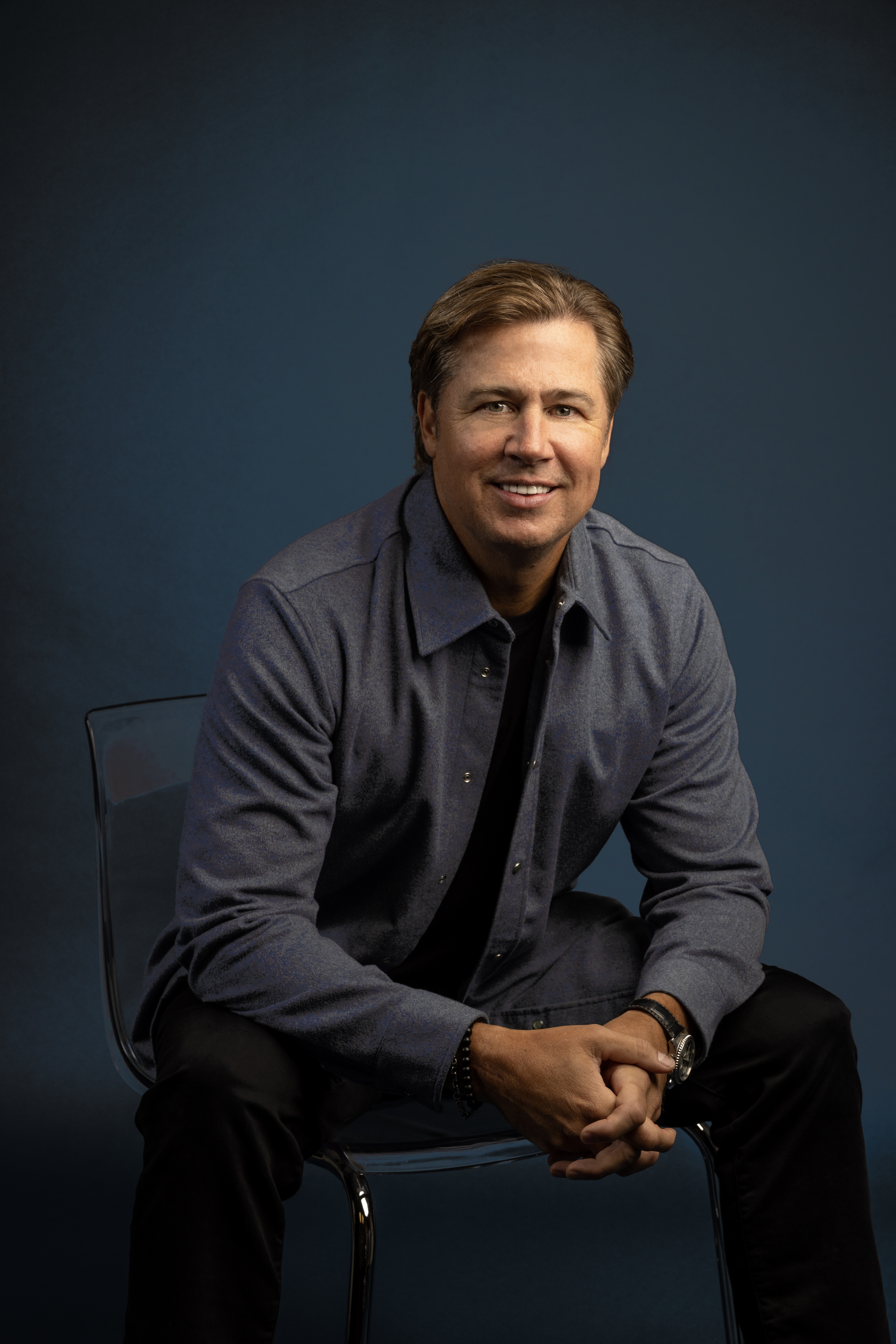
- Pitt in 2024
- Born: Douglas Mitchell Pitt; 1966 (age 59–60); St. Louis, Missouri, U.S.
- Occupations: Businessman, philanthropist
- Known for: Founder of Care to Learn; Goodwill Ambassador for Tanzania
- Spouse: Lisa Pitt
- Children: 3
- Relatives: Brad Pitt (brother)

Douglas Mitchell Pitt (born 1966) is an American businessman and philanthropist. He is the younger brother of actor Brad Pitt.

Pitt is the founder of Care to Learn, a charitable organization based in the United States.

== Early life and education ==
Around 1966, Pitt was born in St. Louis, Missouri, to Jane Etta (née Hillhouse), a school counselor, and William Alvin Pitt, who worked in trucking and real estate industries.

Pitt graduated from Kickapoo High School in Springfield, Missouri, and earned a degree from Southwest Missouri State University (now Missouri State University) in 1990. Pitt was later inducted into the Springfield Public Schools (SPS) Hall of Fame in 2011 and into the university's alumni Hall of Fame in 2019.

== Career ==
In 1991, Pitt founded the technology firm ServiceWorld Computer Center. In 2007, he sold a majority stake in the company to Miami Nations Enterprises but continued as an owner and operational partner. The business received the Springfield Business Journal Philanthropic Business of the Year recognition in 2010.

Pitt co-founded TSI Integrated Services in 2012, partnering with TSI Global, a company based in St. Louis. In 2017, he repurchased his original computer company and reorganized it under the name Pitt Technology Group with co-owner Kevin Waterland. The company subsequently acquired software development firm ConceptiCode in 2018 and audiovisual consultancy AVMAN in 2019.

In 2012, Pitt appeared in a Virgin Mobile Australia campaign portraying a fictionalized version of himself as "The Second Most Famous Pitt", a humorous reference to his brother Brad Pitt.

In 2013, Pitt collaborated with the Ozark Chamber of Commerce to open an Innovation and Business Incubation Center in Ozark, Missouri. In 2014, Pitt founded Pitt Development Group, a real estate investment firm that initially developed apartments and retail centers before focusing on medical office space and land development. In 2015, he joined the Board of Directors of Great Southern Bank.

== Philanthropy ==
Pitt has served on boards of organizations including Big Brothers Big Sisters, Make A Wish, Easter Seals, and the Red Cross. He chaired the Springfield Area Chamber of Commerce and has participated in community initiatives, such as co-chairing the Springfield Homeless Task Force in 2010 and serving on the Early Childhood Committee for the Every Child Promise in 2013.

Since 2011, Pitt has been an Executive Consultant for Enactus and joined the advisory council of The ONE Organization of Missouri in 2013.

=== Care to Learn ===
In 2008, Pitt founded Care to Learn, a nonprofit focused on providing health, hunger, and hygiene assistance to students in Southwest Missouri. The organization partners with schools to meet students' immediate needs and has expanded its services statewide. In 2019, he appeared in a parody video of the film Seven, created with Mother's Brewing Company to promote a beer called Doin' Good, with proceeds benefiting Care to Learn. According to the charity, by 2023 it had assisted more than three million individuals.

=== Tanzania ===
In July 2010, Pitt was appointed as the first Goodwill Ambassador for the United Republic of Tanzania by President Jakaya Kikwete during a ceremony in New York City.

== Personal life ==
Pitt is married to Lisa, and the couple have three children. In 2011, he climbed Mount Kilimanjaro and descended by mountain bike, reportedly becoming the first American to do so. He serves on the Missouri Advisory Committee of the U.S. Global Leadership Coalition.
