= Geshe Lhakdor =

Tibetan Buddhist scholar

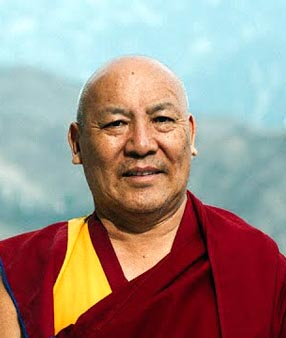
- Born: 1956 (age 69–70); Yakra, Tibet
- Education: Master of Philosophy
- Alma mater: Drepung Loseling Monastic University University of Delhi, Delhi, India Institute for Buddhist Dialectics, Dharamshala Central School for Tibetans in Dalhousie
- Occupations: Director, Library of Tibetan Works and Archives
- Organization(s): Library of Tibetan Works and Archives

Geshe Lhakdor Tibetan: དགེ་བཤེས་ལྷག་རྡོར, Wylie: dge bshes lhag rdor, also Geshe Lobsang Jordhen and Geshe Lhakdor Lobsang Jordan Tibetan: བློ་བཟང་འབྱོར་ལྡན, Wylie: blo bzang 'byor ldan, (born in 1956) is a Tibetan Buddhist scholar who has co-authored and co-translated several books on Tibetan Buddhism. He was also an English translator of the 14th Dalai Lama. He is a Director of the Library of Tibetan Works and Archives in Dharamshala, India. He is also an Honorary Professor at the University of British Columbia, Canada.

== Early life ==
He was born in Yakra, Tibet in 1956. He had to escape from Tibet, when he was only 6 years old in 1962. After coming into exile he attended the Central School for Tibetans in Dalhousie, India from 1972 to 1976.

In 1976, he joined Institute for Buddhist Dialectics in Dharamshala, India where he studied Buddhist Philosophy and successfully completed his Master of Prajnaparamita in 1982.

From 1986 to 1989, he worked as a translator and research assistant at the Tibet House in New Delhi.

In 1989, he received his Master of Philosophy from the University of Delhi. And he completed his Geshe Degree from Drepung Loseling Monastic University in Karnataka State, South India.

== Career ==
He served as the translator and religious assistant of the Dalai Lama in 1989. While working as the Dalai Lama's assistant, he translated several books of the Dalai Lama from English to Tibetan and from Tibetan to English, such as The Way to Freedom, The Joy of Living and Dying in Peace, Awakening the Mind and Lightening the Heart, etc.

In 2005, he became the Director of the Library of Tibetan Works and Archives in Dharamshala, India.

== Honor ==
Geshe Lhakdor was conferred with an Honorary Professorship by the University of British Columbia, Vancouver, Canada in 2002 and the University of Delhi, Psychology Department in 2008.

== Books co-translated ==
He has also worked as a co-translator of the several books by the Dalai Lama .

- The Way to Freedom
- The Joy of Living and Dying in Peace
- Awakening the Mind and Lightening the Heart
- Stages of Meditation (commentary on the Bhāvanākrama). Translated with Losang Choephel Ganchenpa and Jeremy Russell. Snow Lion, 2003. ISBN 978-1-55939-197-9
