= Sonam Rinchen =

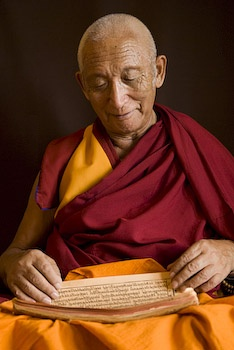
Geshe Sonam Rinchen reads a Buddhist text at home in Dharamsala in 2008 (photo by Peter Aronson)

Geshe Sonam Rinchen (1933–2013) was a Tibetan Buddhist scholar, writer, and teacher. He was born in Trehor region of Kham in Eastern Tibet in 1933. He died in Dharamshala, India, on 5 October 2013.

In 1945, he joined Dhargyey Monastery and entered the monastic university of Sera in Lhasa in 1952, where he studied until he was forced to flee Tibet in 1959.

In India, he completed his studies for the degree of Geshe Lharampa which he received in 1980. He also received the degree of Acarya from the Central Institute of Higher Tibetan Studies in Sarnath. He was appointed resident teacher at the Library of Tibetan Works and Archives in Dharamshala, India in 1978, where he taught Buddhist philosophy and practice, mainly to westerners. He has also taught in Japan, Australia, Great Britain, South Korea, Ireland, New Zealand, and Switzerland.

== Bibliography ==
- Atisha's Lamp for the Path to Enlightenment, ISBN 1-55939-082-4
- The Bodhisattva Vow, ISBN 1-55939-150-2
- Eight Verses for Training the Mind, ISBN 1-55939-259-2 (formerly 1559391650)
- Eight Verses for Training the Mind, Spanish-language edition
- The Heart Sutra, ISBN 1-55939-201-0
- How Karma Works, ISBN 1-55939-254-1
- Nagarjuna's "Seventy Stanzas", ISBN 0-937938-39-4
- The Six Perfections, ISBN 1-55939-089-1
- The Thirty-seven Practices of Bodhisattvas, ISBN 1-55939-068-9
- The Three Principal Aspects of the Path, ISBN 1-55939-116-2
- Yogic Deeds of Bodhisattvas, ISBN 1-55939-019-0 Current Edition, Aryadeva's Four Hundred Stanzas on the Middle Way ISBN 978-1-55939-302-7
- Buddha Nature, 2003 Library of Tibetan Works & Archives, ISBN 81-86470-34-4
