= Loden Sherab Dagyab =

Loden Sherab Dagyab Rinpoche was born on July 27, 1940, in Menya, East Tibet. He was recognized as the reincarnation of the 9th Kyabgoen at the age of four. The Dagyab Kyabgoens have been the spiritual heads of the Dagyab region in Eastern Tibet, and carry the title Hothogthu Nomonhan. 'Hothogthu’ means noble, ‘Nomonhan’ refers to the King of Dharma. This title is exclusive to a small group of the most outstanding and highest-ranking incarnate Lamas, often reincarnations of Regents (Tib. Gyaltul) of Tibet. Dagyab Rinpoche is the only Hothogthu living in the west. The lineage of the Kyabgoens, “Lords of Protection” of the Dagyab region of Tibet, goes back to Dragpa Gyatso (1572 - 1638).

A member of the Gelukpa lineage, Rinpoche graduated from Drepung Monastic University. He was also a member of the monastic communities of Nyagre Khangtsen of Gaden Monastery and of Ratö Monastery. Among his teachers were Trijang Rinpoche and Ling Rinpoche, both tutors of the 14th Dalai Lama. He holds the most transmissions of the Gelugpa lineage, but also many transmissions of the Sakya and Kagyue lineages.

== Exile ==
In 1959 Rinpoche escaped Lhasa and went into exile with the 14th Dalai Lama to Dharamsala, India.

From 1964 to 1966 he directed the Tibet House in New Delhi, an institute for the preservation and support of Tibetan culture.

At the university's invitation in 1966, he joined Bonn University, Germany, to work as a Tibetologist at its Institute for Central Asian Studies.

In 2005 he founded Tibethaus Deutschland in Frankfurt, Germany.

== Selected works ==
- Dagyab Rinpoche, Thomas Lautwein: Achtsamkeit und Versenkung. Lamrin - die tibetische Meditation. 2001, ISBN 3-7205-2264-4
- Dagyab Rinpoche, Robert A. F. Thurman: Buddhist Symbols in Tibetan Culture : An Investigation of the Nine Best-Known Groups of Symbols. 1992, ISBN 3-424-01122-3
- Problems in the development of Tibetan Buddhism in the West Tibetan Buddhism in the West, Problems of Adoption and Cross Cultural Confusion website, from Tibetan Review, October 1992, pp. 15–17

== See also ==
Wikipedia German - Loden Sherab Dagyab
