= Tibet House =

Non-Profit Cultural Organization

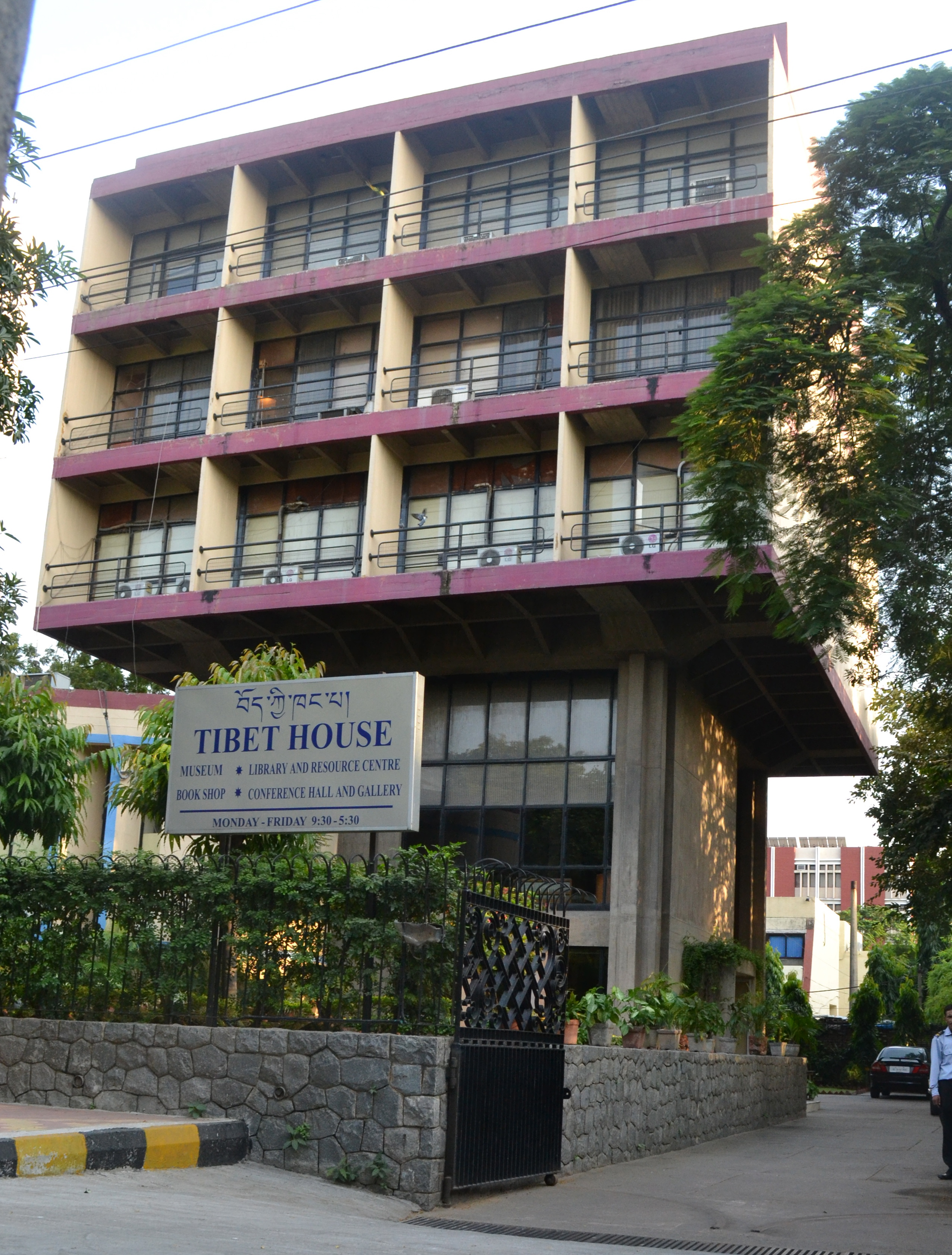
Tibet House Building in Lodhi Road, New Delhi, India

Tibet Houses are an international, loosely affiliated group of nonprofit cultural preservation organizations established at the request of the Dalai Lama. They work to preserve, present, and protect Tibet's ancient traditions in philosophy, mind science, art, and culture, particularly in light of the invasion and annexation of Tibet by the People's Republic of China in 1950 and the subsequent Tibetan diaspora.

The first Tibet House, Tibet House New Delhi was founded in New Delhi, India in 1965. Tulkus Gelek Rimpoche and Dagyab Kyabgoen Rinpoche were its early directors. H.E. Lama Doboom Tulku Rinpoche served as the Director for three decades, until 2011. Geshe Lhakdor was a translator and research assistant from 1986 to 1989. The house was designed by Shiv Nath Prasad in 1970 in the Brutalist architecture style. The current director is Geshe Dorjee Damdul.

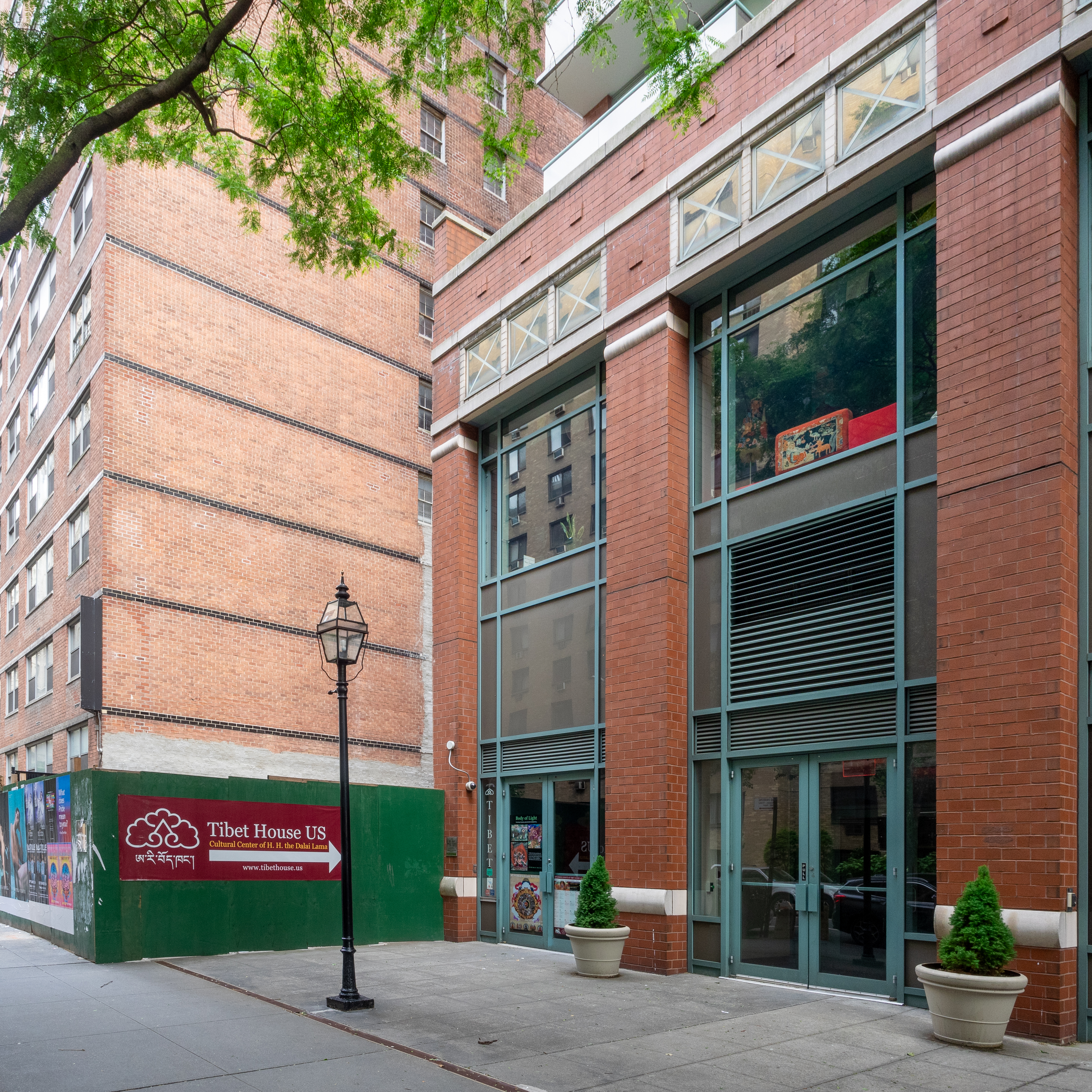
The Tibet House in New York City

Other Tibet Houses include:

- Tibet House Japan, founded in 1975 in Shinjuku, Tokyo.
- Tibet House US was founded in 1987 by scholar Robert Thurman, actor Richard Gere and composer Philip Glass in downtown Manhattan, New York City. Menla, a retreat space located in the Catskills near Phoenicia, New York, is an offshoot of Tibet House US. The project was spearheaded by Robert Thurman and Nena Thurman.
- Casa Tibet México, founded in 1989 in Mexico City.
- Casa del Tibet Barcelona, founded in 1994 in Spain.
- Tibet House Trust, founded in 1994 in London, England.
- Tibet Haus Germany, founded by Spiritual Director Dagyab Kyabgoen Rinpoche in 2005, in Frankfurt. and
- Tibet House Moscow, founded in 2004 in Russia.
- Tibet House Brasil, in São Paulo, Brazil.

There are several references to Tibet Houses in a 1964 Central Intelligence Agency "Memorandum for the Special Group", which explained "agency expenditures in support of the Tibetan program" focused on political action, propaganda, and paramilitary efforts.

"The Agency is supporting the establishment of Tibet Houses in New Delhi, Geneva, and New York City. The Tibet Houses are intended to serve as unofficial representation for the Dalai Lama to maintain the concept of a separate Tibetan political identity. The Tibet House in New York City will work closely with Tibetan supporters in the United Nations, particularly the Malayan, Irish, and Thai delegations."

e. Tibet Houses in New York, Geneva, and New Delhi (1/2 year) — $ 75,000

In 1998 the Tibetan government-in-exile stated that the CIA subsidy was "spent on setting up offices in Geneva and New York and on international lobbying," the Tibet Bureau in Geneva and the Office of Tibet in Washington D.C., formerly in New York. Lodi Gyari, the Dalai Lama’s personal representative in Washington, said he did not know about the CIA's $180,000-a-year subsidy or where the money went.

== See also ==
- List of organizations of Tibetans in exile
- Central Tibetan Administration
- Sinicization of Tibet
- Annexation of Tibet by the People's Republic of China
- Battle of Chamdo
- History of Tibet (1950–present)
- Tibetan diaspora
- Tibetan sovereignty debate
