= Yagra Township, Zhongba County =

Yagra
- Location within Tibet
- Coordinates: 29°32′30″N 83°56′16″E
- Country: China
- Region: Tibet

Population
  - Total
  - Major Nationalities: Tibetan
  - Regional dialect: Tibetan language
- Time zone: +8

Yagra is a village and township in the Tibet Autonomous Region of China, not far from the base of the sacred Mount Kailash. The Bukhar, one of the upper tributaries of the Indus River, begins near Yagra and is fed by snowmelt.

== See also ==
- List of towns and villages in Tibet
