= Little Tennessee Watershed Association =

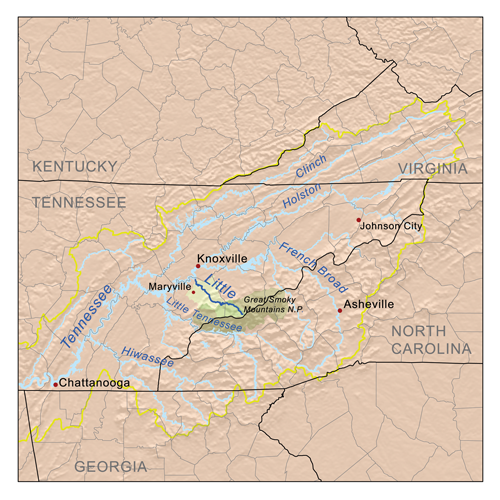
Map of the Little Tennessee River watershed

The Little Tennessee Watershed Association (LTWA) is a conservation organization formed in 1993 in Franklin, NC to protect and restore the health and waters of the Little Tennessee River and its tributaries upstream of the Fontana reservoir through monitoring, education, habitat restoration, and citizen action. With around 140 members, the organization advocates for the conservation of the watershed in Macon County and its surrounding counties, helps protect and restore at-risk properties in the watershed, and maintains a biomonitoring program that charts the quality of aquatic life and biodiversity of the river.

== History ==
In 1993, citizens, local government officials, and scientists attending a local watershed conference in Franklin recognized that accelerating growth and development were impacting the health of the Little Tennessee River watershed, and decided that they needed a strategy to protect water quality, aquatic life, and biodiversity in the watershed. The 200-plus people who participated decided that an organization was needed to lead the effort, and the LTWA was born.

From 1994 onward, the LTWA operated as an all-volunteer organization under the Southwestern North Carolina Resource Conservation and Development Council, part of the US Department of Agriculture's Natural Resource Conservation Service. In 1998, the LTWA hired its first paid staff member. It earned 501c(3) nonprofit status in 2001.

== Activity in the watershed ==
The LTWA focuses broadly on biomonitoring, education, restoration, and advocacy.

=== Biomonitoring ===
The LTWA's biomonitoring program is headed by Dr. William McLarney, who began monitoring the Little Tennessee watershed in 1990, before the LTWA was founded. The data from this program provides a picture of the biodiversity of the watershed over the past 20 years, and is the largest fish-based biomonitoring database in the world for any comparably sized watershed. Throughout the program's history, over 2,000 volunteers have participated in field work and data collection at over 150 sites around the watershed, and data from the program appears in the Southern Appalachian Information Node database, making it accessible all over the world.

=== Education ===
The LTWA has provided informal courses as part of volunteer biomonitoring activities for individuals and groups from many organizations including Franklin High School, Macon Middle School, Upward Bound, Outward Bound, NCCAT, The Mountain Retreat Center, SAFC, interns at the Coweeta Hydrologic Laboratory, and many others. It played a major role in creating a Biomonitoring Curriculum for Macon County schools in partnership with Coweeta Hydrologic Lab and has worked with the Tennessee Valley Authority's "Kids in the Creek" program. It has also published several guides and publications about the watershed, including A Field Guide to the Fishes of the Upper Little Tennessee Watershed, a 71-page illustrated booklet about 68 species of fish in the watershed, Sediment in our Watershed, a 4-page brochure funded by the Little Tennessee Nonpoint Source with information about the problems of sediment, and The State of the Streams in the Upper Little Tennessee Watershed: A Report on Water Quality and Habitat Trends, 1990-2002 , which uses data from the biomonitoring program to illustrate the overall health of the watershed.

=== Restoration ===
In the past decade, the LTWA has partnered with the Macon Soil and Water Conservation District and local landowners to perform voluntary restoration projects on more than 3.4 miles of eroded stream bank, plant more than 10.3 miles of vegetative buffer, and install 4.6 miles of livestock fence along local waterways. The organization also collaborates with the Land Trust for the Little Tennessee (also based in Franklin) to purchase, protect and restore at-risk tracts of land in the watershed.

==== Tessentee Farm ====
In 2008, the LTWA coordinated a volunteer effort to restore part of a 64-acre tract of bottomland and river bluff land at the junction of Tessentee Creek and the Little Tennessee River owned by the LTLT known as the Tessentee Farm back to its condition prior to the addition of a man-made pond and other landscaping.

==== The Watauga Restoration Project ====
In 2006, the LTWA was awarded a grant to study the spotfin chub, designated as a threatened species by the US Fish and Wildlife Service. Staff aquatic biologist and biomonitoring program leader William McLarney identified several potential barriers to fish passage between the Lake Emory Dam in Franklin to the Fontana reservoir in Swain County that appeared to be contributing to the decline of the spotfin chub in the watershed. This research led to a multi agency effort by the North Carolina Department of Environment and Natural Resources, the North Carolina Division of Water Quality, USFWS, the North Carolina Department of Transportation, NRCS, the North Carolina Wildlife Resources Commission, and North Carolina State University to assess barriers to aquatic organism passage through the Little Tennessee and its tributaries. By 2007, several potential locations for restoration efforts (mostly located on private property) had been identified. The LTWA requested funds to pursue a restoration project along Watauga Creek in Macon County, and received a federal stimulus grant through the USFWS's Partners for Fish & Wildlife Program funds program (part of the American Recovery and Reinvestment Act of 2009). It then collaborated with local contractors on dam and culvert removal, temporary flow diversion around the dam during construction and some streambank stabilization, and built new free-spanning bridges that wouldn't block fish passage. The project is still ongoing, with the LTWA organizing volunteer groups to plant trees, sow grass seed, and lay down straw mulch.

=== Advocacy ===
The LTWA provides a pro-conservation voice in local politics, playing an active role on Macon County's Watershed Council, and advocates for the protection of the Little Tennessee watershed.

==== Rabun County Water Reclamation Facility ====
The organization has been a vocal opponent of a recent request by the commissioners of Rabun County, Georgia, for a National Pollutant Discharge Elimination System (NPDES) permit from the Georgia Environmental Protection Division that would allow the county to discharge up to 2 million gallons per day of treated wastewater into the Little Tennessee. The proposed Rabun County Water Reclamation Facility, located at a former Fruit of the Loom plant in the headwaters of the watershed, would upgrade the Fruit of the Loom building's existing treatment plant, which was formerly an industrial wastewater facility, allowing it to treat domestic and industrial wastewater and act as the county's municipal wastewater treatment plant. The LTWA outlined its primary concerns in comments submitted by the Southern Environmental Law Center on their behalf to the Georgia EPD during the 30-day permit draft comment period, calling for a public hearing to address whether the permit should be granted and to ensure that it contains appropriate provisions to protect downstream users of the river.

This prompted Macon County commissioners to vote unanimously to submit a letter to the Georgia Environmental Protection Division echoing the LTWA's call for a public hearing and highlighting concerns about the permit, including "interbasin transfer implications, the impact on a section of the Little Tennessee already listed as impaired, the town's plans to use the Little Tennessee as a public water supply, concerns raised about the use of chlorine for disinfection."

When the Georgia EPD agreed and scheduled a public hearing in the Rabun County courthouse, executive director Jenny Sanders urged Macon County citizens and officials to attend. The entire five-member Macon board of commissioners attended the meeting, as well as Franklin alderman Bob Scott, county manager Jack Horton, soil and erosion control officer Matt Mason, Director of Permitting, Planning and Development Jack Morgan and county planner Derek Roland.

==== Needmore Road improvements ====
The LTWA has also publicly opposed North Carolina Department of Transportation's proposal to pave and widen 3.3 miles of Needmore Road between Byrd road in Macon County and existing pavement in Swain County. The proposal to expand the road, which runs along the Little Tennessee River near the 4,500-acre protected Needmore Tract owned by the LTLT, was met with widespread opposition from the public. The LTWA submitted a letter to the NC DOT and the US Army Corps of Engineers outlining its concerns about the proposal, claiming that proposed method of widening the road—blasting through the acidic rock that borders it—would have a negative impact on the Little Tennessee and those who live near it. When the NC DOT granted Macon County commissioners' request for a public hearing on the road improvements, the LTWA urged both its members and the public to come out in opposition. The NCDOT is reconsidering its plans for the road's expansion, and has scheduled a post-hearing meeting for November 30, 2010, to "review every comment received and (to) make a decision about what the next steps are."

== Organizational structure ==
The LTWA's board of directors comprises:

- Stacy Guffey, Chair
- Stephanie Laseter, Vice Chair
- Dick Heywood, Treasurer
- Sarah Weresuk, Secretary
- Kathy Tinsley
- Chad Boniface
- Ed Haight
- Dr. Don Dewhurst
- Vic Greene
- Ryan Griffith

The LTWA's staff members are:

- Jenny Sanders, Executive Director
- Dr. Bill McLarney, Biomonitoring Program Director
- Jason Meador, Watershed Program Coordinator
- Sharon Willard, Bookkeeper
