= List of accolades received by Inglourious Basterds =

Inglourious Basterds awards and nominations
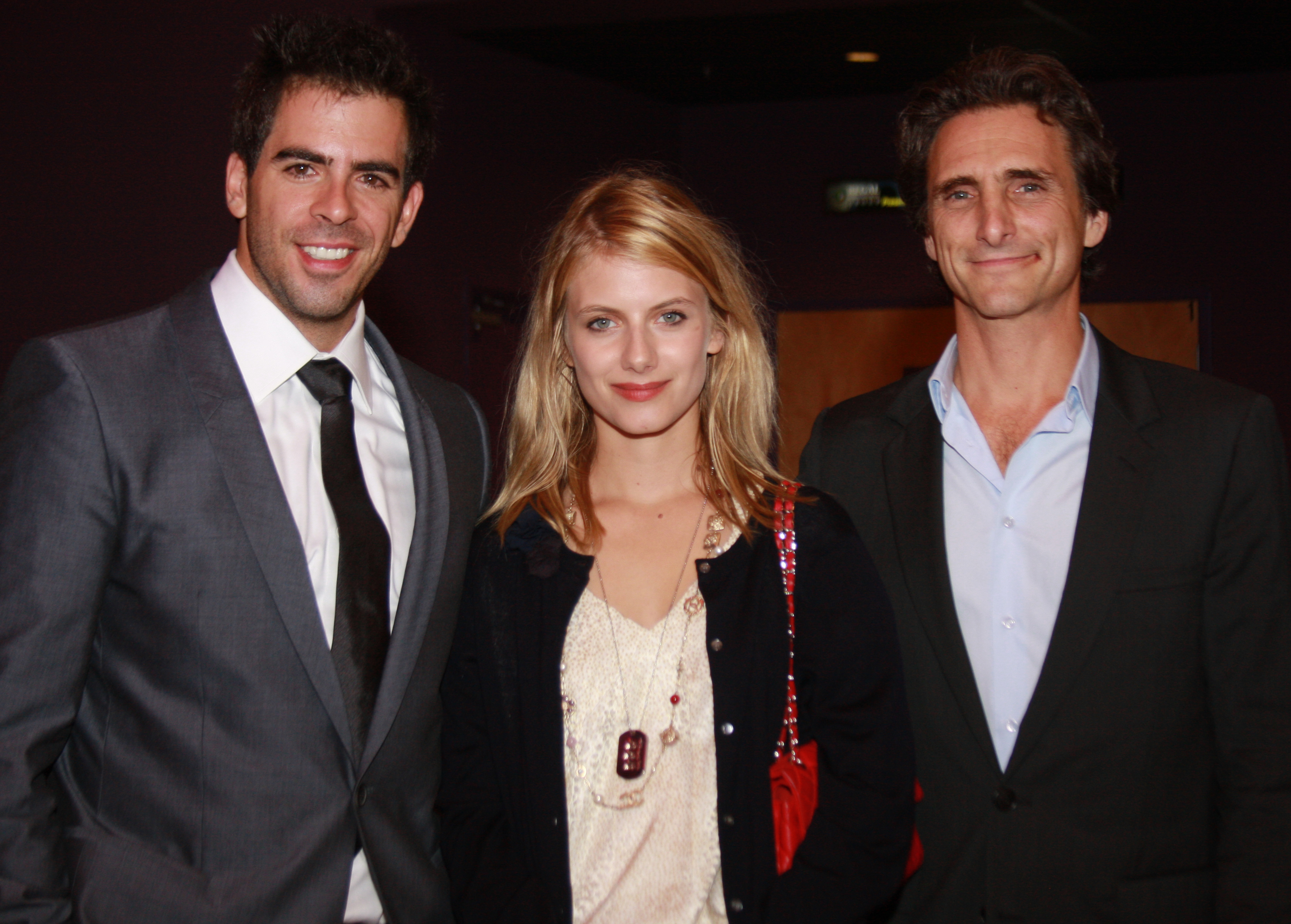
- Actors Eli Roth and Mélanie Laurent, with producer Lawrence Bender
Awards and nominations
Award	Wins	Nominations
Academy Award	1	8
American Society of Cinematographers	0	1
Art Directors Guild	0	1
Austin Film Critics	3	3
Boston Film Critics	1	1
British Academy Film Awards	1	6
Broadcast Film Critics	3	10
Cannes Film Festival	1	2
Chicago Film Critics	1	5
David di Donatello Awards	1	1
Directors Guild of America Awards	0	1
Empire Awards	1	5
Film Critics Circle of Australia	1	1
Golden Eagle Award	0	1
Golden Globe Awards	1	4
Grammy Awards	0	1
Hollywood Film Festival	1	1
London Film Critics' Circle	1	1
Los Angeles Film Critics	1	1
Motion Picture Sound Editors	1	2
MTV Movie Awards	0	1
NME Awards	1	1
New York Film Critics	1	1
New York Film Critics Online	4	4
Online Film Critics	4	8
Palm Dog	0	1
People's Choice Awards	1	1
Producers Guild of America Awards	0	1
San Diego Film Critics	6	8
Satellite Awards	1	2
Saturn Awards	1	7
Screen Actors Guild	2	3
Toronto Film Critics Association	3	4
Washington D.C. Area Film Critics	2	4

Totals (Note: Certain award groups do not simply award one winner. They acknowledge several different recipients, have runners-up, and have third place. Since this is a specific recognition and is different from losing an award, runner-up mentions are considered wins in this award tally. For simplification and to avoid errors, each award in this list has been presumed to have had a prior nomination.)
- Wins: 49
- Nominations: 102

Inglourious Basterds is a 2009 World War II film written and directed by Quentin Tarantino. It premiered on May 20, 2009, at the 62nd Cannes Film Festival, before being widely released in theaters in the United States and Europe in August 2009 by The Weinstein Company and Universal Studios. The film grossed over $38 million in its opening weekend, making it the box office number one. Inglourious Basterds opened internationally at number one in 22 markets on 2,650 screens making $27.49 million. In total, the film has grossed over $320 million worldwide, making it Tarantino's third highest-grossing film to date, behind Django Unchained (2012) and Once Upon a Time in Hollywood (2019).

Inglourious Basterds has earned various awards and nominations, with nominations in categories ranging from recognition of the screenplay to its direction and editing to the cast's acting performance, particularly Christoph Waltz's portrayal of the film's antagonist, Col. Hans Landa. The film was submitted for consideration for the Palme d'Or at the 62nd annual Cannes Film Festival, but lost to The White Ribbon. Waltz was later given the Best Actor Award. Inglourious Basterds received four nominations at the 67th Golden Globe Awards ceremony and came away with the award for Best Actor In A Supporting Role In A Motion Picture.

Inglourious Basterds received eight Academy Awards nominations; the ceremony saw Waltz win for Best Supporting Actor. The film was nominated for six awards at the 63rd British Academy Film Awards, winning the Best Supporting Actor award. The film won two awards at the 16th Screen Actors Guild Awards for Outstanding Performance by a Male Actor in a Supporting Role and Outstanding Performance by a Cast in a Motion Picture. The film later went on to win four more of its nominations for Best Cast from the 15th Critics' Choice Awards, and 14th San Diego Film Critics Society Awards.

Waltz also received recognition for his performance at the 2009 Boston Society of Film Critics Awards, 35th LA Film Critics Association Awards and 75th NY Film Critics Circle Awards, winning Best Supporting Actor from all three of the organizations. Waltz's performance in the film was named one of Time magazines 'Great Performances' in film 2009.

== Awards and nominations ==
Date of ceremony	Award	Category	Recipients and nominees	Result
March 7, 2010	Academy Award	Best Picture	Lawrence Bender	Nominated
March 7, 2010	Academy Award	Best Director	Quentin Tarantino	Nominated
March 7, 2010	Academy Award	Best Supporting Actor	Christoph Waltz	Won
March 7, 2010	Academy Award	Best Original Screenplay	Quentin Tarantino	Nominated
March 7, 2010	Academy Award	Best Cinematography	Robert Richardson	Nominated
March 7, 2010	Academy Award	Best Film Editing	Sally Menke	Nominated
March 7, 2010	Academy Award	Best Sound Editing	Wylie Stateman	Nominated
March 7, 2010	Academy Award	Best Sound Mixing	Michael Minkler, Tony Lamberti and Mark Ulano	Nominated
February 27, 2010	American Society of Cinematographers	Outstanding Achievement in Cinematography in Theatrical Releases	Robert Richardson	Nominated
February 13, 2010	Art Directors Guild	Best Production Design For A Feature Period Film	David Wasco	Nominated
December 15, 2009	Austin Film Critics	Best Actor in a Supporting Role	Christoph Waltz	Won
December 15, 2009	Austin Film Critics	Best Actress in a Leading Role	Mélanie Laurent	Won
December 15, 2009	Austin Film Critics	Best Original Screenplay	Quentin Tarantino	Won
December 13, 2009	Boston Film Critics	Best Actor in a Supporting Role	Christoph Waltz	Won
February 21, 2010	British Academy Film Awards	Best Supporting Actor	Christoph Waltz	Won
February 21, 2010	British Academy Film Awards	Best Director	Quentin Tarantino	Nominated
February 21, 2010	British Academy Film Awards	Best Original Screenplay	Quentin Tarantino	Nominated
February 21, 2010	British Academy Film Awards	Best Cinematography	Robert Richardson	Nominated
February 21, 2010	British Academy Film Awards	Best Editing	Sally Menke	Nominated
February 21, 2010	British Academy Film Awards	Best Production Design	David Wasco and Sandy Reynolds Wasco	Nominated
January 15, 2010	Broadcast Film Critics	Best Original Screenplay	Quentin Tarantino	Won
January 15, 2010	Broadcast Film Critics	Best Actor in a Supporting Role	Christoph Waltz	Won
January 15, 2010	Broadcast Film Critics	Best Cast	Inglourious Basterds	Won
January 15, 2010	Broadcast Film Critics	Best Action Film	Inglourious Basterds	Nominated
January 15, 2010	Broadcast Film Critics	Best Art Direction	David Wasco	Nominated
January 15, 2010	Broadcast Film Critics	Best Cinematography	Robert Richardson	Nominated
January 15, 2010	Broadcast Film Critics	Best Costume Design	Anna B. Sheppard	Nominated
January 15, 2010	Broadcast Film Critics	Best Director	Quentin Tarantino	Nominated
January 15, 2010	Broadcast Film Critics	Best Editing	Sally Menke	Nominated
January 15, 2010	Broadcast Film Critics	Best Film	Inglourious Basterds	Nominated
May 13–24, 2009	Cannes Film Festival	Best Actor	Christoph Waltz	Won
May 13–24, 2009	Cannes Film Festival	Palme d'Or	Quentin Tarantino	Nominated
December 21, 2009	Chicago Film Critics	Best Film	Inglourious Basterds	Nominated
December 21, 2009	Chicago Film Critics	Best Director	Quentin Tarantino	Nominated
December 21, 2009	Chicago Film Critics	Best Original Screenplay	Quentin Tarantino	Nominated
December 21, 2009	Chicago Film Critics	Best Supporting Actor	Christoph Waltz	Won
December 21, 2009	Chicago Film Critics	Best Cinematography	Robert Richardson	Nominated
May 7, 2010	David di Donatello Awards	Best Foreign Film	Inglourious Basterds	Won
January 30, 2010	Directors Guild of America Awards	Outstanding Directorial Achievement in Motion Pictures	Quentin Tarantino	Nominated
March 28, 2010	Empire Awards	Best Actor	Christoph Waltz	Won
March 28, 2010	Empire Awards	Best Film	Inglourious Basterds	Nominated
March 28, 2010	Empire Awards	Best Director	Quentin Tarantino	Nominated
March 28, 2010	Empire Awards	Best Actress	Mélanie Laurent	Nominated
March 28, 2010	Empire Awards	Best Thriller	Inglourious Basterds	Nominated
May 31, 2010	Film Critics Circle of Australia	Best Foreign Film in the English Language	Inglourious Basterds	Nominated
January 29, 2010	Golden Eagle Award	Best Foreign Language Film	Inglourious Basterds	Nominated
January 17, 2010	Golden Globe Awards	Best Actor in a Supporting Role	Christoph Waltz	Won
January 17, 2010	Golden Globe Awards	Best Director	Quentin Tarantino	Nominated
January 17, 2010	Golden Globe Awards	Best Drama Film	Inglourious Basterds	Nominated
January 17, 2010	Golden Globe Awards	Best Screenplay	Quentin Tarantino	Nominated
January 31, 2010	Grammy Awards	Best Compilation Soundtrack Album for Motion Picture, Television or Other Visual Media	Various Artists	Nominated
October 26, 2009	Hollywood Film Festival	Best Actor in a Supporting Role	Christoph Waltz	Won
February 18, 2010	London Film Critics' Circle	Actor of the Year	Christoph Waltz	Won
December 14, 2009	Los Angeles Film Critics	Best Supporting Actor	Christoph Waltz	Won
February 20, 2010	Motion Picture Sound Editors	Best Dialogue and ADR in a Feature Film	Inglourious Basterds	Won
February 20, 2010	Motion Picture Sound Editors	Best Sound Effects and Foley in a Feature Film	Inglourious Basterds	Nominated
June 6, 2010	MTV Movie Awards	Best Villain	Christoph Waltz	Nominated
February 24, 2010	NME Awards	Best Film	Inglourious Basterds	Won
December 14, 2009	New York Film Critics	Best Actor in a Supporting Role	Christoph Waltz	Won
December 13, 2009	New York Film Critics Online	Best Cinematography	Robert Richardson	Won
December 13, 2009	New York Film Critics Online	Best Screenplay	Quentin Tarantino	Won
December 13, 2009	New York Film Critics Online	Best Supporting Actor	Christoph Waltz	Won
December 13, 2009	New York Film Critics Online	Breakthrough Performer	Christoph Waltz	Won
January 5, 2010	Online Film Critics	Best Original Screenplay	Quentin Tarantino	Won
January 5, 2010	Online Film Critics	Best Actress	Mélanie Laurent	Won
January 5, 2010	Online Film Critics	Best Supporting Actor	Christoph Waltz	Won
January 5, 2010	Online Film Critics	Best Cinematography	Robert Richardson	Won
January 5, 2010	Online Film Critics	Best Picture	Inglourious Basterds	Nominated
January 5, 2010	Online Film Critics	Best Director	Quentin Tarantino	Nominated
January 5, 2010	Online Film Critics	Best Supporting Actress	Diane Kruger	Nominated
January 5, 2010	Online Film Critics	Best Editing	Sally Menke	Nominated
May 22, 2009	Palm Dog	Best Performance by a Canine	The Black Poodle	Nominated
January 6, 2010	People's Choice Awards	Favorite Independent Movie	Inglourious Basterds	Won
January 24, 2010	Producers Guild of America Awards	Producer of the Year Award	Lawrence Bender	Nominated
December 15, 2009	San Diego Film Critics	Best Actor in a Supporting Role	Christoph Waltz	Won
December 15, 2009	San Diego Film Critics	Best Cast	Inglourious Basterds	Won
December 15, 2009	San Diego Film Critics	Best Director	Quentin Tarantino	Won
December 15, 2009	San Diego Film Critics	Best Film	Inglourious Basterds	Won
December 15, 2009	San Diego Film Critics	Best Production Design	David Wasco	Won
December 15, 2009	San Diego Film Critics	Best Original Screenplay	Quentin Tarantino	Won
December 15, 2009	San Diego Film Critics	Best Editing	Sally Menke	Nominated
December 15, 2009	San Diego Film Critics	Best Cinematography	Robert Richardson	Nominated
December 20, 2009	Satellite Awards	Best Actor in a Supporting Role	Christoph Waltz	Won
December 20, 2009	Satellite Awards	Best Cinematography	Robert Richardson	Nominated
June 24, 2010	Saturn Awards	Best Action/Adventure/Thriller Film	Inglourious Basterds	Won
June 24, 2010	Saturn Awards	Best Actress	Mélanie Laurent	Nominated
June 24, 2010	Saturn Awards	Best Supporting Actor	Christoph Waltz	Nominated
June 24, 2010	Saturn Awards	Best Supporting Actress	Diane Kruger	Nominated
June 24, 2010	Saturn Awards	Best Direction	Quentin Tarantino	Nominated
June 24, 2010	Saturn Awards	Best Writing	Quentin Tarantino	Nominated
June 24, 2010	Saturn Awards	Best Costume	Anna B. Sheppard	Nominated
January 23, 2010	Screen Actors Guild	Outstanding Performance by a Male Actor in a Supporting Role	Christoph Waltz	Won
January 23, 2010	Screen Actors Guild	Outstanding Performance by a Cast in a Motion Picture	Inglourious Basterds	Won
January 23, 2010	Screen Actors Guild	Outstanding Performance by a Female Actor in a Supporting Role	Diane Kruger	Nominated
December 16, 2009	Toronto Film Critics Association	Best Director	Quentin Tarantino	Nominated
December 16, 2009	Toronto Film Critics Association	Best Film	Inglourious Basterds	Won
December 16, 2009	Toronto Film Critics Association	Best Screenplay	Quentin Tarantino	Won
December 16, 2009	Toronto Film Critics Association	Best Supporting Actor	Christoph Waltz	Won
December 7, 2009	Washington D.C. Area Film Critics	Best Actor in a Supporting Role	Christoph Waltz	Won
December 7, 2009	Washington D.C. Area Film Critics	Best Original Screenplay	Quentin Tarantino	Won
December 7, 2009	Washington D.C. Area Film Critics	Best Director	Quentin Tarantino	Nominated
December 7, 2009	Washington D.C. Area Film Critics	Best Film	Inglourious Basterds	Nominated
