= Mother's Brewing Company =

Microbrewery in Springfield, Missouri

Coordinates: 37.2079°N 93.2992°W

- Location: Springfield, Missouri, USA
- Opened: 2011
- Annual production volume: 10,000 US beer barrels (12,000 hL) (2014)
- Owned by: Jeff and Lindsay Seifried

Active beers
Name	Type
Towhead	American Blonde
Three Blind Mice	Brown ale
Lil’ Helper	India Pale Ale

Seasonal beers
Name	Type
Sandi Wheat	Unfiltered Wheat
Winter Grind	Coffee stout

Mother's Brewing Company is an independent microbrewery in the heart of downtown Springfield, Missouri, USA, brewing beer since 2011. The beers are currently distributed in the majority of Missouri, Arkansas, and the most eastern portion of Kansas.

== History ==
Mother's Brewing Company was founded by Jeff Schrag, a Springfield entrepreneur and publisher. The brewery was built in the former home of a Butternut bread bakery owned by Hostess Brands. The bakery was closed in 2009 when the company faced financial difficulties. Schrag purchased the building in 2010. Demolition and renovations were completed by May 2011. The company celebrated with a concert and festival that had over 2,700 in attendance.

The brewery building currently houses all operations for Mother's. The brewhouse is capable of producing 30 US barrels, or 60 kegs, of beer in a single batch.

The brewery building also includes a bar and events space called the Tasting Room. The Tasting Room is open to the public during limited hours and offers free samples of all the beers on tap. The Tasting Room also sells pints, Growlers, and Mother's merchandise. The room will also offer tours of the brewery on Saturdays. Tours are scheduled to start in July 2011, and will focus on the sensory experiences of brewing beer.

On May 30, 2012, National Brewer's Association said Mother's was one of 250 craft breweries that opened in 2011, but of them all, Mother's was number one. The association went on to say Mother's had the best launch of any new brewery opening in the past five years.

== Specialty Beers ==
Name	Original Release Date	Availability	Style	ABV%	IBU
Trop Top	February 2018	Spring/Summer Seasonal	A light-bodied pale ale with a bright tropical edge, Trop Top is a bottle of paradise by the dashboard lights.	6	40
Oktoberfest	August 2011	Fall Seasonal	Traditional amber lager, brewed to celebrate the fall harvest. Extended aging creates a medium bodied beer with a smooth malty flavor and just the faintest touch of hops.	5.5	20
Winter Grind	October 2011-12	Winter Seasonal	We’ve combined the rich goodness of a stout with our cold-brewed espresso blend, roasted for us by our coffee loving neighbors at the Mudhouse. The result is a wintery treat that’ll give coffee and beer lovers a reason to cheer!	6.0	18
Mr. Pumpkin	2012	Fall Seasonal	Mr. Pumpkin is a mild mannered salesman by day, but a wild card at night. Enjoy out doors on cool fall nights, or when slaving over the stove making that holiday dinner for the in-laws. If pie can be for breakfast, well it certainly should work as beer. Plus you don’t have to worry about mastering your grandmother's piecrust recipe. Invite Mr. Pumpkin to your next dinner and the conversation will never end.	5.0	10
Imperial Three Blind Mice	March 2012	Mother's Others	Atlas himself might get a bit wobbly trying to hold up this hefty lager. Mother's super Czech-style Pilsner is a medium- to full-bodied brew that makes a strong first impression. Under all that muscle lies a soft malt sweetness, balanced by a ton of Saaz hops. Feeling big and mighty? Build your triceps with every last sip.	8.5	58
MILF	2012	Mother's Others	Brewed with cocoa nibs and raisins and then lovingly aged in rum, sherry, bourbon, brandy and whiskey barrels, this big beer takes on flavors from the spirit and wood of each barrel. The end result is a complex and elegant companion that's right for carefree nights of privilege and excess.	11.0	50
Doozy!	2013	Mother's Others	Big and hoppy and pleasantly bitter, Doozy is a Double IPA crafted for hop lovers by hop lovers. At every stage of the brewing process, we saw another chance to add more coveted Citra hops. The result is a medium-bodied, deep-golden beer that's knock you back bold from start to finish. Did we mention the hops?	9.0	80
Foggy Notion	2013	Mother's Others	Not quite English. Not quite American. Foggy Notion is a boozy, 100% Ozarks-born barley wine. Boatloads of malt give this full-bodied beauty a deep-copper color & light brown sugar flavor. Six months of aging nurtures hints of oak & stone fruit, making Foggy Notion perfect for sharing or sipping alone.	10.0	44
Rated R	2016	Mother's Others	Imperial Wheat stout emboldened by the addition of Askinosie Honduras cocoa nibs, Burundi cold brew coffee from the Coffee Ethic, and vanilla beans that we cut open and scraped out. The result is complex, rich, and dry.	11.5	52
