= Gyatsho Tshering =

Tibetan-born Indian scholar

Gyatsho Tshering (1936 in Kingdom of Sikkim – 25 June 2009 in Minneapolis, United States), also spelled Gyatso Tsering, was Tibetan scholar of Indian nationality. He was the former director of the Library of Tibetan Works and Archives.

== Biography ==
Tshering was born in Sikkim of Lobsang Lama and Nyima Dolma and completed his studies at the University of Calcutta. He then worked at the Ministry of External Affairs and the Ministry of Home Affairs of the Government of India, and worked at the Indian Consulate-General in Lhasa and at the Government of Sikkim.

After his studies, he planned to become director of the Namgyal Institute of Tibetology and was sent for training at the Consulate of India in Lhasa, where he hold a position in 1955 until its closure during the Sino-Indian War in 1962. He states that between 1955 and 1959, some of the work at the consulate was to gather information on the activities of the Chinese army, and was therefore aware of the tension in March 1959. On the evening of 17 March, the atmosphere was particularly tense, and he spent the night with his colleagues at the consulate where he could not sleep. At 2 am, the shelling began, he knew that the 14th Dalai Lama left the Norbulingka, but kept it secret. He decided to go out to see what happens, and found the streets full of Chinese soldiers, shouting and firing at close range. There were masses of corpses. The artillery fired at Potala, the bombing lasted 2 hours, after which the monks got out from the Potala, providing easy targets for Chinese military guns. He also saw two women and a man walking on the road, white scarves at hands as a sign of peace. They were mown down by 4 or 5 shots. In a monastery near the Potala, he saw Chinese soldiers looking for weapons, threatening thirty Tibetans who raised their hands, who were finally shot

He joined the Central Tibetan Administration in 1963 and worked in various departments until his retirement in the late 1990s.

He worked for publishing and translation services in 1965. In 1966, he was transferred to the Ministry of Foreign Affairs and in 1967 to the Department of Religion and Culture. During this period, he was a member of the entourage of the 14th Dalai Lama during his first trip to Japan and Thailand.

Subsequently, he was promoted Secretary of the Ministry and later Deputy Minister. In 1972, he became the Acting Director of the Library of Tibetan Works and Archives newly created until the appointment of Prof. Thupten Jigme Norbu as director in June this same year. He was appointed by the Dalai Lama as the new director of the Library of Tibetan Works and Archives in 1974 and held that position from 1 March until his retirement April 1998.

In 1999, he joined his wife, Namgyal Dolma, to the United States and they settled in Minneapolis.

Tshering's most significant contribution is the development of the Library of Tibetan Works and Archives as pre-eminent center for Tibetan studies at international level.

Tshering died in 2009. He is survived by his wife Namgyal Dolma and his daughter Yiga Lhamo.

== Tributes ==
American singer-songwriter Larry Long wrote the song "Tibet" in Tshering's honor.

== Some of his publications ==
=== Books ===
- The Tibetan Cathedral, Thekchen Chholing, Dharamsala, Himachal Pradesh: A Souvenir, Ed. Tibetan Cultural Printing Press, 1970
- The Guru Puja and The Hundred Deities of the Land of Joy, Dharamsala, Library of Tibetan Works and Archives, 1995

=== Preface ===
- Vivre la méditation au quotidien, Dalaï-Lama; trad. de l'anglais par Pema Dorje et Marie-Pierre d'Haillecourt; assistés pour la version définitive par M.-T. Guettab; Paris : Éd. Dewatshang, 1995

=== Translations ===
- Yeshi Donden, 'Tibetan Medicine: A Brief History, translated by Gyatsho Tshering', The Tibet Society Bulletin, 5 (1972): pp. 7–24.
