= Library of Tibetan Works and Archives =

Library

Coordinates: 32.2263°N 76.3254°E

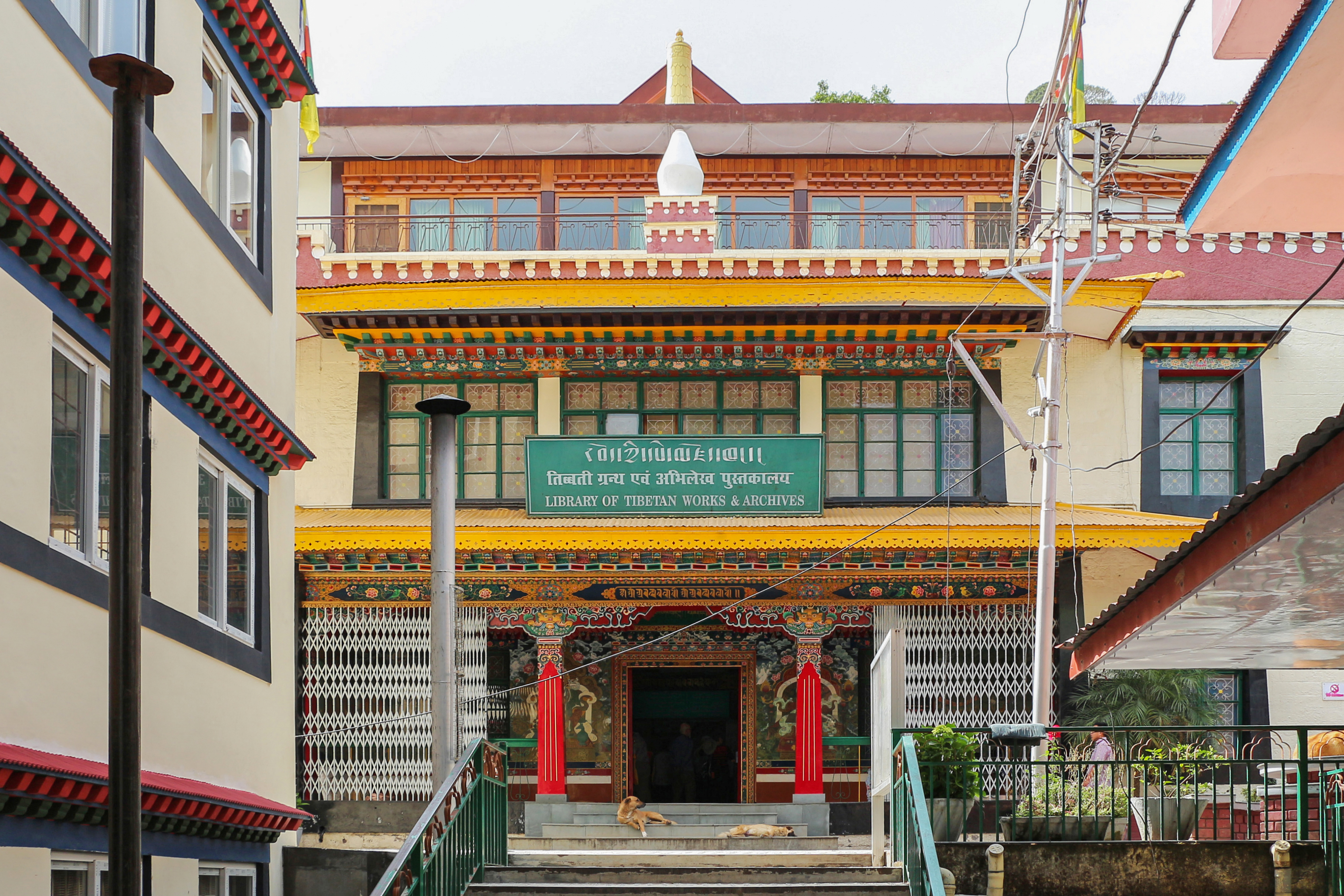
Library of Tibetan Works and Archives

The Library of Tibetan Works and Archives (LTWA) is a Tibetan library in Dharamshala, India. The library was founded by Tenzin Gyatso, the 14th Dalai Lama on 11 June 1970, and is considered one of the most important libraries and institutions of Tibetan works in the world.

The library contains sources which were relocated from Tibet during the 1959 escape, including important Tibetan Buddhist manuscripts and archives related to Tibet's history, politics, culture and even art. It possesses more than 80,000 manuscripts, books and documents; over 600 thangkas, statues and other artefacts of Buddhist heritage; 10,000 photographs; and many other materials.

The directors have included Geshe Lhakdor, and Geshe Sonam Rinchen had also been scholar-in-residence.

The second floor of the library contains a museum (opened in 1974) containing notable artifacts and items that date back to the twelfth century.

== See also ==
- Geshe Sonam Rinchen
- Gyatsho Tshering
