= Grand Canal Shoppes =

Shopping mall in Las Vegas, Nevada, U.S.

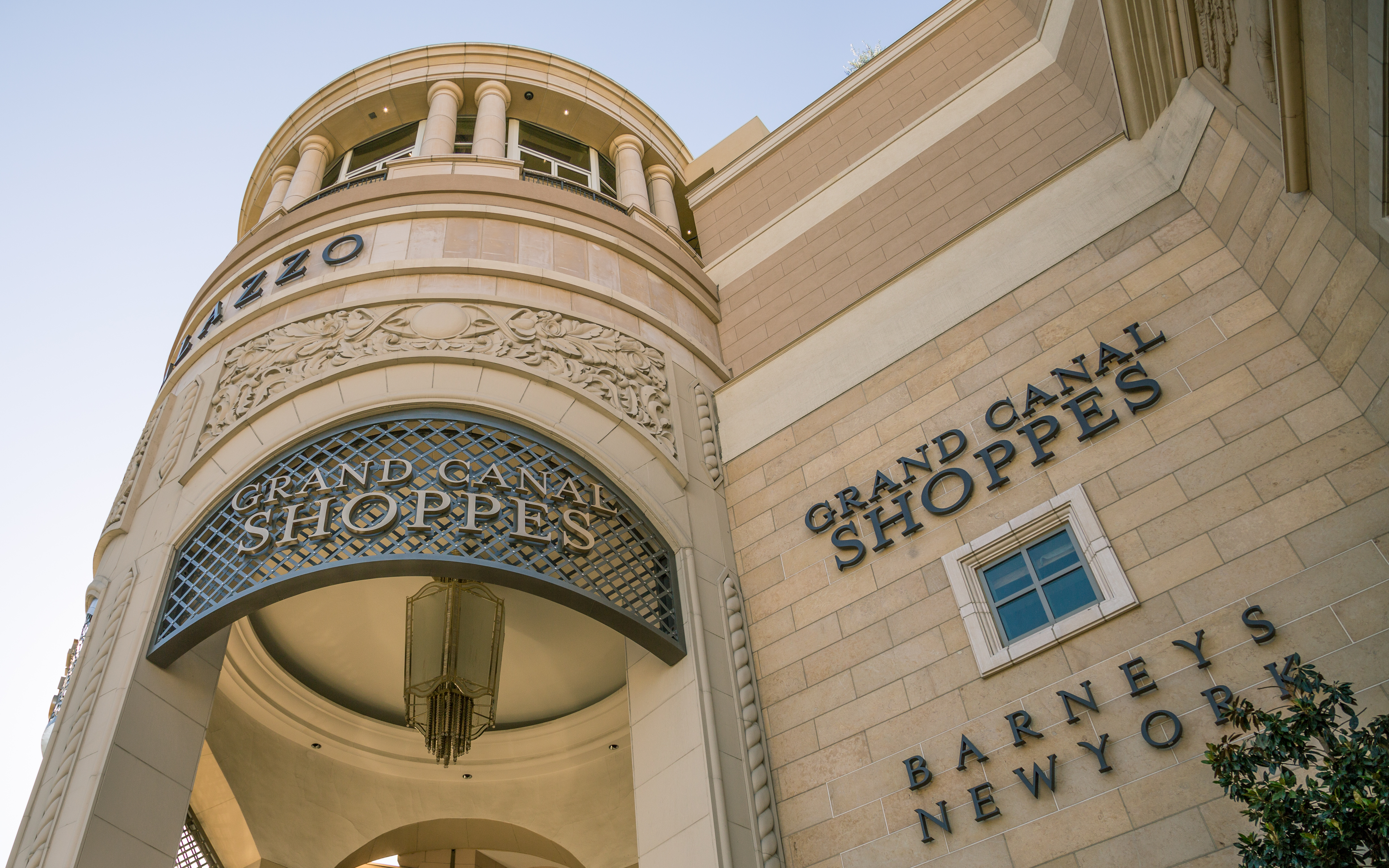
- Mall exterior outside of Palazzo, 2015
- Location: Paradise, Nevada, United States
- Coordinates: 36°7′17″N 115°10′10″W
- Address: 3377 Las Vegas Boulevard
- Opened: June 16, 1999; 27 years ago
- Developer: Las Vegas Sands
- Manager: GGP
- Owner: GGP
- Num. of stores: 208
- Floor area: 736,228 sq ft (68,397.8 m^{2})
- Floors: 3
- Website: grandcanalshoppes.com

The Grand Canal Shoppes is an upscale shopping mall inside the Venetian and Palazzo resorts on the Las Vegas Strip in Paradise, Nevada, United States.

The Grand Canal Shoppes opened on June 16, 1999, shortly after the Venetian. The mall has many designer and upscale boutiques, and includes indoor canals, where gondolas take people around the facility. Live performances can also be found throughout the mall.

A second mall, The Shoppes at the Palazzo, opened on January 18, 2008, and has since been rebranded as part of the Grand Canal Shoppes. In total, the facility features more than 200 tenants and 875,000 sq ft (81,300 m^{2}).

== History ==
The Grand Canal Shoppes are part of the Venetian resort, both developed by Las Vegas Sands. The Venetian opened on May 4, 1999, although several features were still under construction, including the Grand Canal Shoppes. The mall's opening was rescheduled several times, delayed in part by county inspections of fire safety systems. It eventually opened on June 16, 1999, with 16 of 72 tenants. The $300 million mall was built on the Venetian's second level, above the casino floor. It was managed by Forest City Enterprises, which also held ownership in two other Las Vegas area retail centers: Showcase Mall and Galleria at Sunset.

In 2004, Las Vegas Sands sold the mall to General Growth Properties (GGP) for $766 million. The sale helped Las Vegas Sands to finance construction of The Palazzo, a sister resort to the Venetian. GGP agreed to pay an additional $600 million for future retail space in the Palazzo. The Shoppes at the Palazzo opened on January 18, 2008, though with less tenants than expected, due to construction delays. The Shoppes at the Palazzo have since been rebranded as part of the Grand Canal Shoppes.

As of 2008, the Grand Canal Shoppes at the Venetian averaged 20 million visitors a year. In 2013, GGP sold half of its interest in the Grand Canal Shoppes, including the Shoppes at the Palazzo, for net proceeds of $410 million as part of a new joint venture with TIAA-CREF. GGP was acquired by Brookfield Properties in 2018.

== Features ==
The Grand Canal Shoppes originally contained 500,000 sq ft (46,000 m^{2}). The mall interior is a recreation of St. Mark's Square and features a sky painted ceiling. The resort's canal and gondola rides travel through the mall. Numerous performers provide free entertainment around the mall, including acrobats, living statues, opera singers, and stilt walkers. The Grand Canal Shoppes was focused on upscale stores, including Jimmy Choo, Pal Zileri, Ann Taylor, and Kenneth Cole Productions.

The Shoppes at the Palazzo measured 450,000 sq ft (42,000 m^{2}). In total, the two malls feature 208 tenants and 875,000 sq ft (81,300 m^{2}), including 736,228 sq ft (68,397.8 m^{2}) of retail space. The Palazzo side of the mall, like the Venetian, also featured high-end retailers, including Cole Haan and Piaget. Its anchor store was a three-level, 85,000 sq ft (7,900 m^{2}) Barneys New York, which announced its closure in 2019, after the company filed for Chapter 11 bankruptcy.

One of the mall's earliest restaurants, WB Stage 16, was a themed eatery which also included a lounge and a private screening room for parties. The restaurant area was themed after four Warner Bros. films, including Gold Diggers of 1933, Casablanca, Ocean's 11 and Batman.

A risqué nightclub, known as the Act, opened in 2012, as a Las Vegas outpost of the Box in New York and The Box Soho in London. The club struggled financially, and Las Vegas Sands sought to evict it, alleging obscene and sexual acts. It closed in 2013. Atomic Saloon Show, developed by Spiegelworld, opened in 2019, taking over the former Act space.

Chef Buddy Valastro opened a restaurant in 2013. Dal Toro, a restaurant and exotic car showroom, operated until 2016. An ice bar was opened the following year. In 2019, Smith & Wollensky opened a 15,000 sq ft (1,400 m^{2}) restaurant and lounge, while Rick Harrison of Pawn Stars opened a high-end gallery of miscellaneous items.

In 2021, PanIQ Escape Room opened a location at the mall that includes cocktail service. Villa Azur, a small chain of restaurants originating in South Beach, eventually opened a location at the Grand Canal Shoppes in 2022. Villa Azur is a European restaurant and lounge featuring live entertainment. Flight Club, a 16,000 sq ft (1,500 m^{2}) bar and darts facility, also opened in 2022. It includes a 27-seat bar designed to resemble a carousel.

== Gallery ==
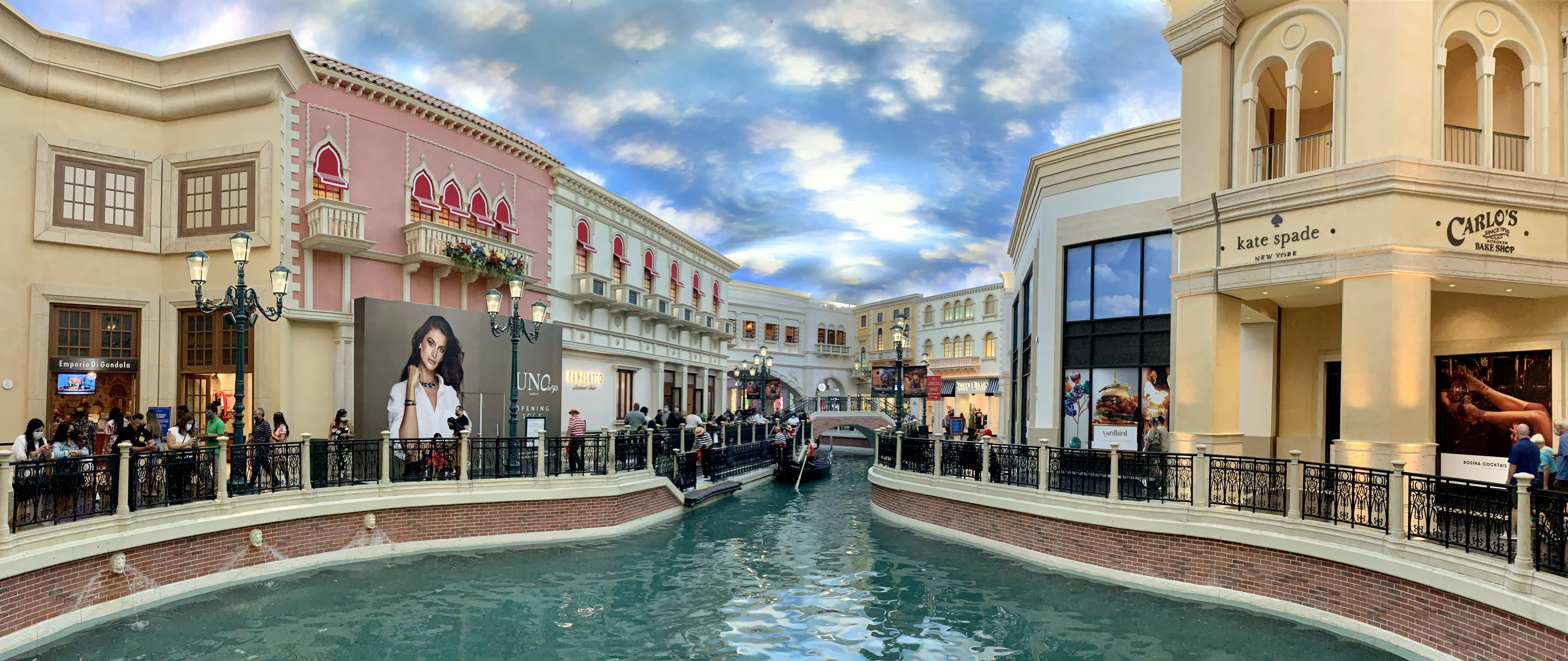
Grand Canal Shoppes (2021)

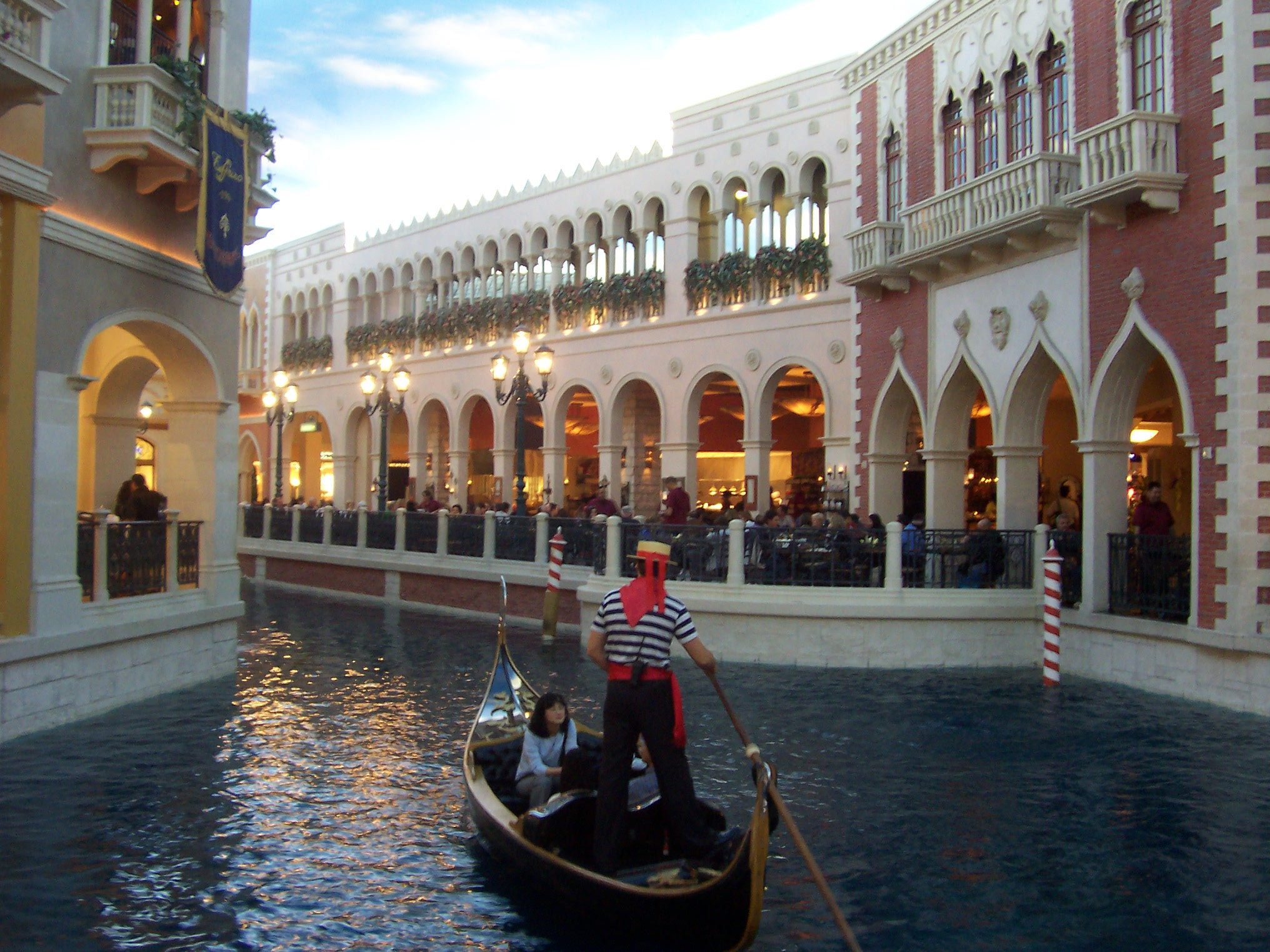
Gondola ride

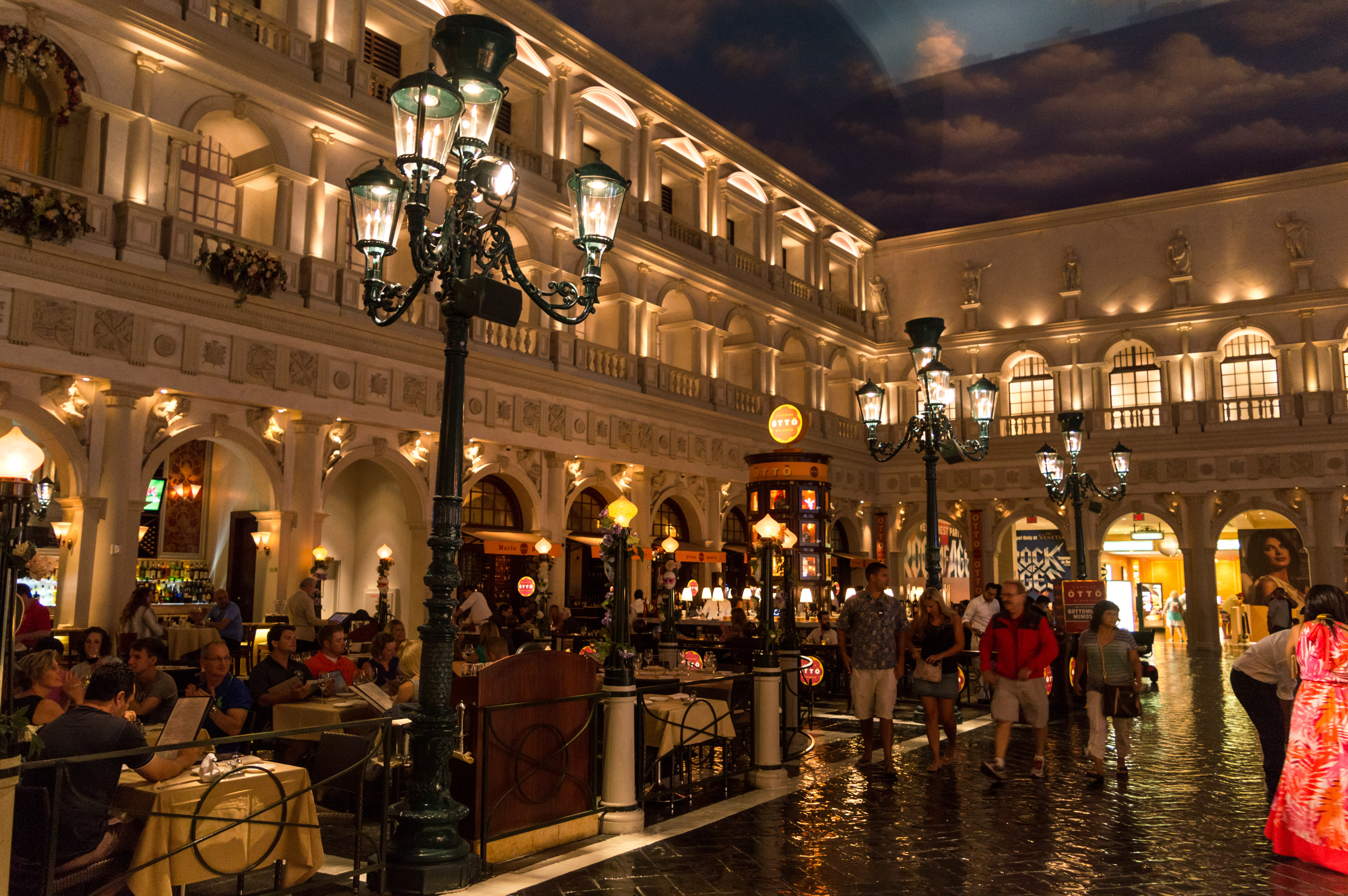
A restaurant in the Grand Canal Shoppes

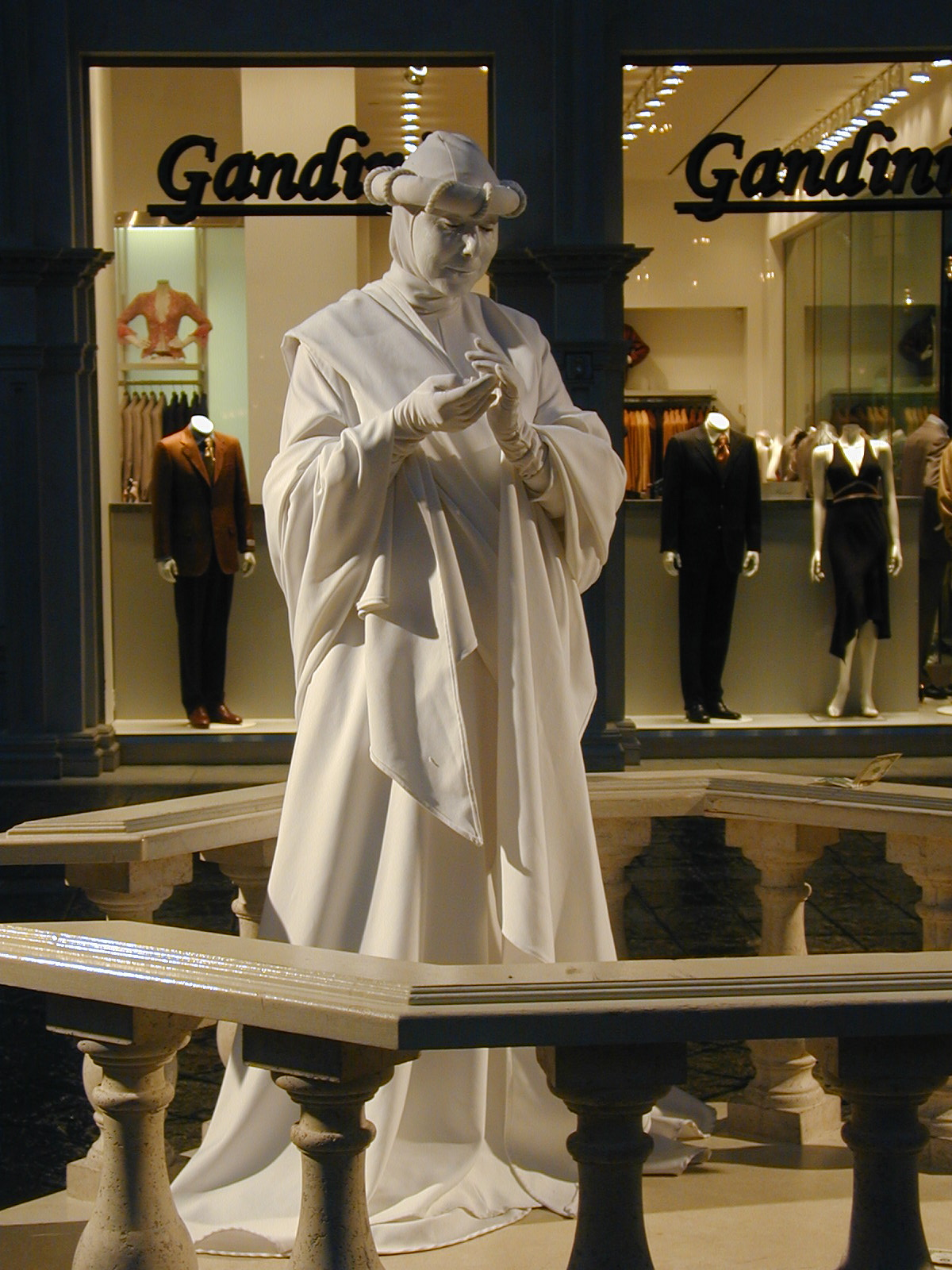
Living statue performer in the Grand Canal Shoppes

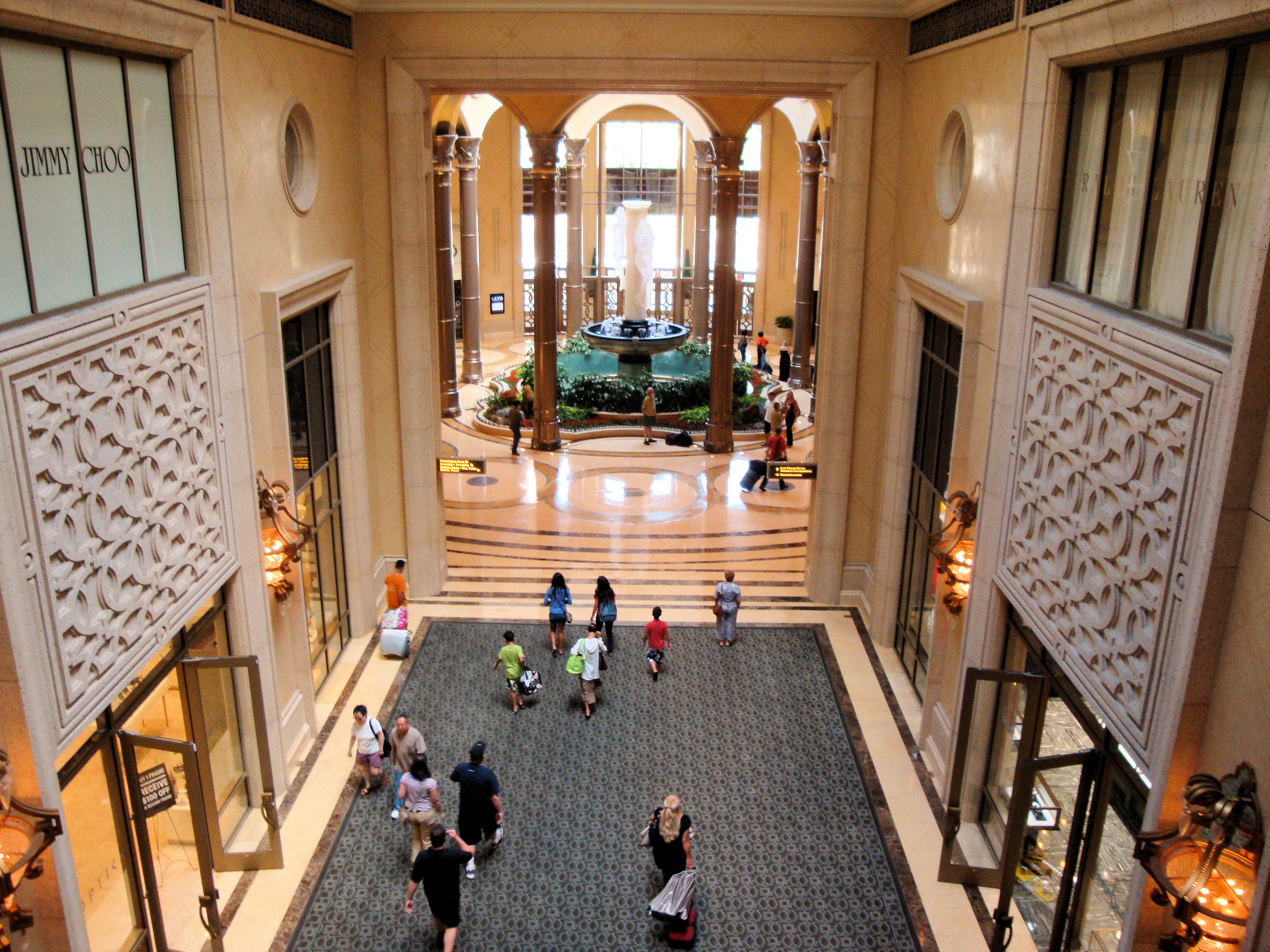
Palazzo shops
