= Death Prefers Blondes =

2019 novel by Caleb Roehrig

- Author: Caleb Roehrig
- Language: English
- Genre: Young adult fiction; Adventure
- Publisher: Feiwel and Friends
- Publication date: January 2019
- Publication place: United States
- Pages: 448
- ISBN: 9781250155825

Death Prefers Blondes is a young adult adventure book written by Caleb Roehrig and published in 2019 by Feiwel and Friends, a Macmillan Publishers imprint. It tells the story of Margo, a teen socialite that also executes heists during the night with a group of drag queens.

== Reception ==
Publishers Weekly gave the book a positive review, noting all the main characters are "likable, each contending with their own issues, making them relatable despite their less-than-legal hobby." The publication also commented on Roehrig's style of "infusing tongue-in-cheek humor into darker subject matters".

Maggie Reagan, writing for the Booklist, gave the book a starred review, praising the author's ability at "[b]alancing Oceans 11–level heists, corporate espionage, and gender and sexual identity politics" and calling it a "[c]lever, thrilling, and a wildly good time." The School Library Journal review started by calling it a "slow read", but continued by praising the characters and noting the "steamy LGBTQ and heterosexual romance" present in the book.
