= Clem Harvey =

American film actor (1919–1988)

Harold Jerry Swarts (1919 – December 2, 1988), known professionally as Clem Harvey, was an American film actor. He played one of the Eleven in the original version of Ocean's 11, Louis Jackson, a Mormon cowboy from Salt Lake City. Harvey died in Tulsa, Oklahoma on December 2, 1988, at the age of 69.

== Filmography ==
Year	Title	Role	Notes
1954	Johnny Guitar	Posse	Uncredited
1960	Ocean's 11	Louis Jackson	
1961	One-Eyed Jacks	Tim	
1961	Armored Command	Tex	
1961	A Thunder of Drums	Trooper Denton	
1962	State Fair	Doc Cramer	(final film role)
