= The Palazzo =

Casino hotel in Paradise, Nevada

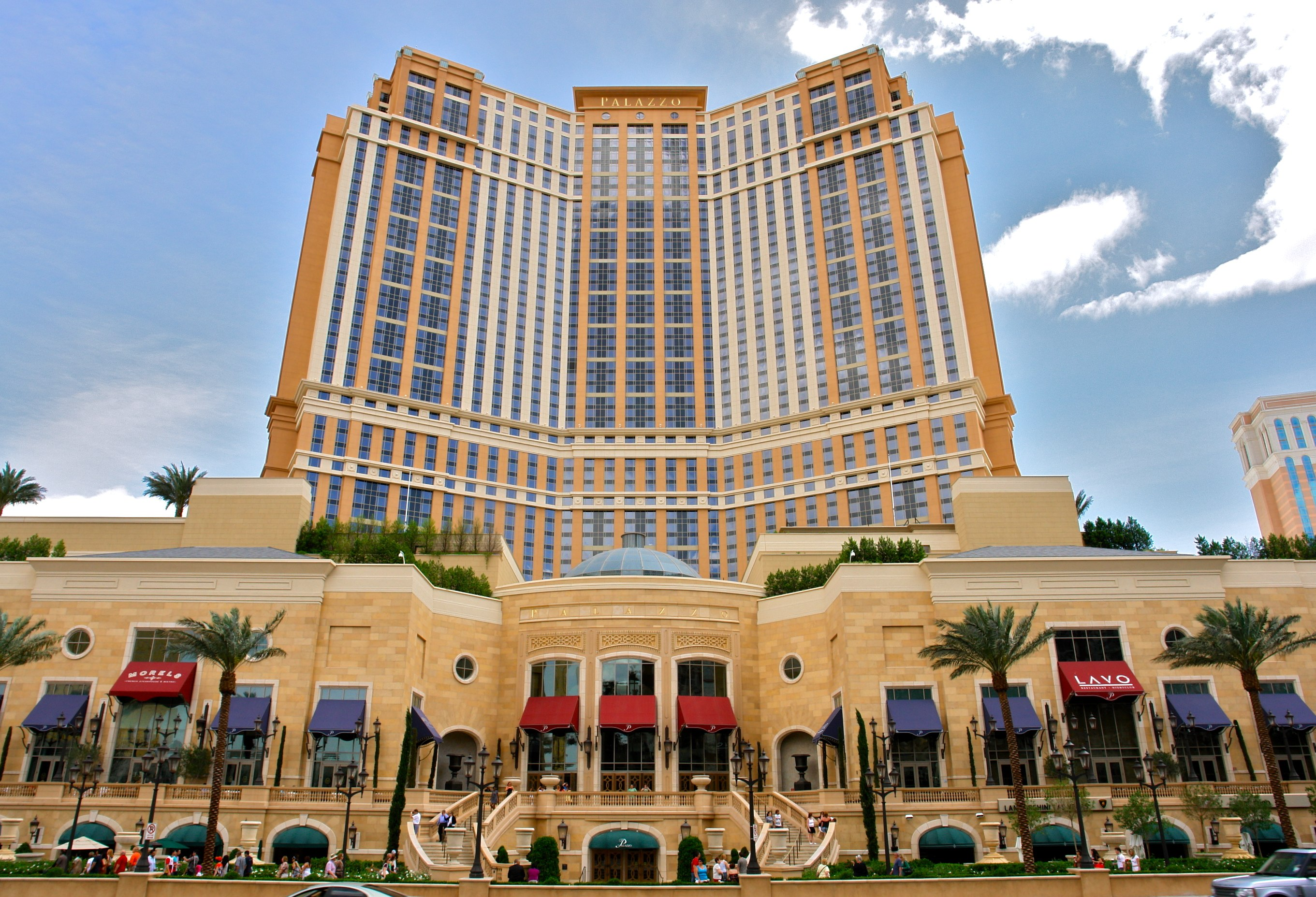
- The Palazzo in 2009

- Location within Las Vegas Strip Location within Nevada
- Interactive map of The Palazzo
- Location: Paradise, Nevada, U.S.; 3325 South Las Vegas Boulevard; 36°07′17″N 115°10′08″W
- Opened: December 30, 2007; 18 years ago
- Theme: Italian
- No. of rooms: 3,066
- Gaming space: 105,000 sq ft (9,800 m^{2})
- Permanent shows: Jersey Boys (2008–2011)
- Signature attractions: Grand Canal Shoppes
- Notable restaurants: Table 10 (until 2017); Carnevino (2008–2018); Lagasse's Stadium (2009–2020); Lavo
- Casino type: Land-based
- Owner: Vici Properties
- Operating license holder: Apollo Global Management
- Architect: HKS Architects
- Renovated in: 2016–2018
- Website: www.venetian.com/towers/the-palazzo.html

The Palazzo /pəˈlɑːtsoʊ/ (also called The Palazzo at The Venetian) is a luxury hotel and casino resort located on the Las Vegas Strip in Paradise, Nevada. The Palazzo is part of a larger complex (operated as one hotel) comprising the adjoining Venetian resort and Venetian Expo, all of which are owned by Vici Properties and operated by Apollo Global Management. The complex ranks as the third-largest hotel in the world.

The Palazzo was developed by Las Vegas Sands as a sister property to its Venetian resort, opened in 1999. Construction on the Palazzo began in September 2004, and the resort began a phased opening on December 30, 2007. The $1.9 billion property features an Italian theme, and includes a 105,000 sq ft (9,800 m^{2}) casino, 3,066 suites in a 50-story tower, the 875,000 sq ft (81,300 m^{2}) Grand Canal Shoppes, and an 1,800-seat performance theater. The resort was designed as a green building by HKS Architects. In 2008, it earned Silver LEED certification from the U.S. Green Building Council, becoming the largest LEED-certified building in the world. It was sold to Apollo Global Management and Vici Properties in 2022.

== History ==
=== Background ===
The Palazzo is a sister property to The Venetian, located directly south. Both were developed by businessman Sheldon Adelson through his company Las Vegas Sands. The Venetian opened in 1999, and Adelson planned to begin construction later that year on a second resort, known then as Lido, named after Lido di Venezia. Adelson initially hoped to open the second resort in 2000, but instead delayed the project shortly after the Venetian's debut. The Venetian opened while construction was ongoing, and Adelson sought to wait for its completion before seeking financing for another resort.

The Palazzo site had been occupied by numerous motels dating as far back as 1949. The Tam O'Shanter motel was built and opened in 1959, on 1.5 acres (0.61 ha) of the land. It was owned by Bernie Zeldin and named after Illinois' Tam O'Shanter Golf Course, where he frequently played. The motel had 100 rooms, and featured a distinctive neon sign resembling a tam o' shanter cap. Zeldin declined numerous offers to purchase the Tam O'Shanter, including one from businessman Howard Hughes.

Before his death in 1997, Zeldin finalized a $12.5 million deal to sell the Tam O'Shanter to Las Vegas Sands. Adelson was a friend of Zeldin. Venetian officials purchased 11.4 acres (4.6 ha) of land, including the Tam O'Shanter, in October 1998. Zeldin's daughter operated the Tam O'Shanter until its closure. At the end of 2003, the Zeldin family was informed of plans to demolish the motel for a future resort, later known as the Palazzo.

Tam O'Shanter closed on January 12, 2004, and was demolished a month later, following an asbestos-removal project that took 19 days to complete. A Vagabond Inn, also located on the property, contained asbestos as well and was demolished simultaneously. The asbestos removal cost between $500,000 and $1 million. The land had also been occupied by the Las Vegas Kosher Deli, as well as several small stores owned by the Venetian that were expected to close, helping make way for the Palazzo. Prior to the Palazzo project, an Asia Resort and Casino had been proposed to for the site.

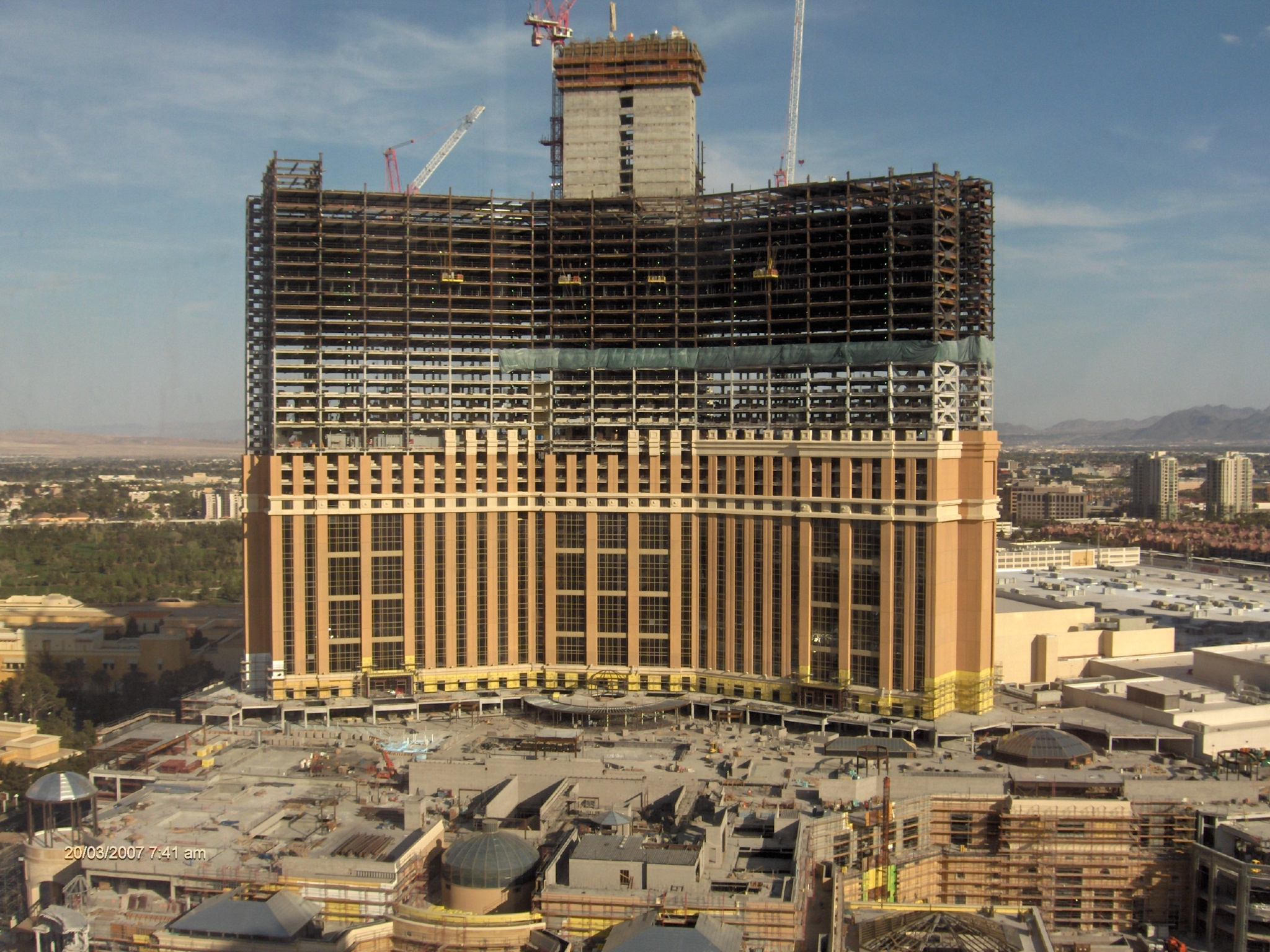
The Palazzo during construction (March 2007)

Local developer Steve Wynn opposed the project, alleging that the Venetian/Palazzo site already suffered from inadequate parking. Wynn was developing the Wynn Las Vegas across the street and expressed concern that parking spaces at his property would be used by Palazzo guests.

Foundation work on the Palazzo began in September 2004, without a groundbreaking ceremony. The resort occupies 14 acres (5.7 ha). Crews spent 13 months excavating nearly 70 feet deep, in order to build a 4,400-space underground parking garage. Filming for the 2007 film Ocean's Thirteen took place at the Palazzo's hotel tower during construction, filling in as the film's fictional Bank resort.

The total cost for the resort was $1.9 billion. In December 2004, Las Vegas Sands made its initial public offering, with some of the proceeds going toward the Palazzo project. Other financing came from the sale of the Grand Canal Shoppes, a mall within the Venetian.

=== Opening and subsequent years ===
Construction continued after the resort's opening, which occurred in phases. The casino portion hosted a soft opening on December 30, 2007. A few days later, Las Vegas Sands promoted the resort with a parade float during the Rose Parade in California. The hotel opened on January 4, 2008, and the resort held a grand opening celebration from January 17–19, with performances by Diana Ross and Seal. The resort employed 4,000 workers. Like the Venetian, convention-goers would be an important demographic at the Palazzo; another would be Asian high rollers.

In 2009, the Palazzo received the AAA Five Diamond Award. Travel + Leisure included the Palazzo on its list of top 100 hotels in the world, ranking it 48th and 18th for 2009 and 2010 respectively. Travelocity ranked it in eighth place in a 2011 list of top 10 Las Vegas hotels, based on guest reviews. In 2020, readers of USA Today ranked the Venetian and Palazzo among the 10 best casinos in Las Vegas.

By the end of 2020, Las Vegas Sands wanted to focus on its operations in Macau. The company was in early discussions to sell the Venetian, the Palazzo, and the adjoining Sands Expo. Adelson died in January 2021, and Las Vegas Sands announced two months later that it would sell the three Las Vegas facilities for $6.25 billion. Through the deal, Vici Properties bought the land under the facilities for $4 billion, and Apollo Global Management acquired the operations for $2.25 billion as part of a triple net lease agreement with Vici. The sale was finalized in February 2022.

== Features ==
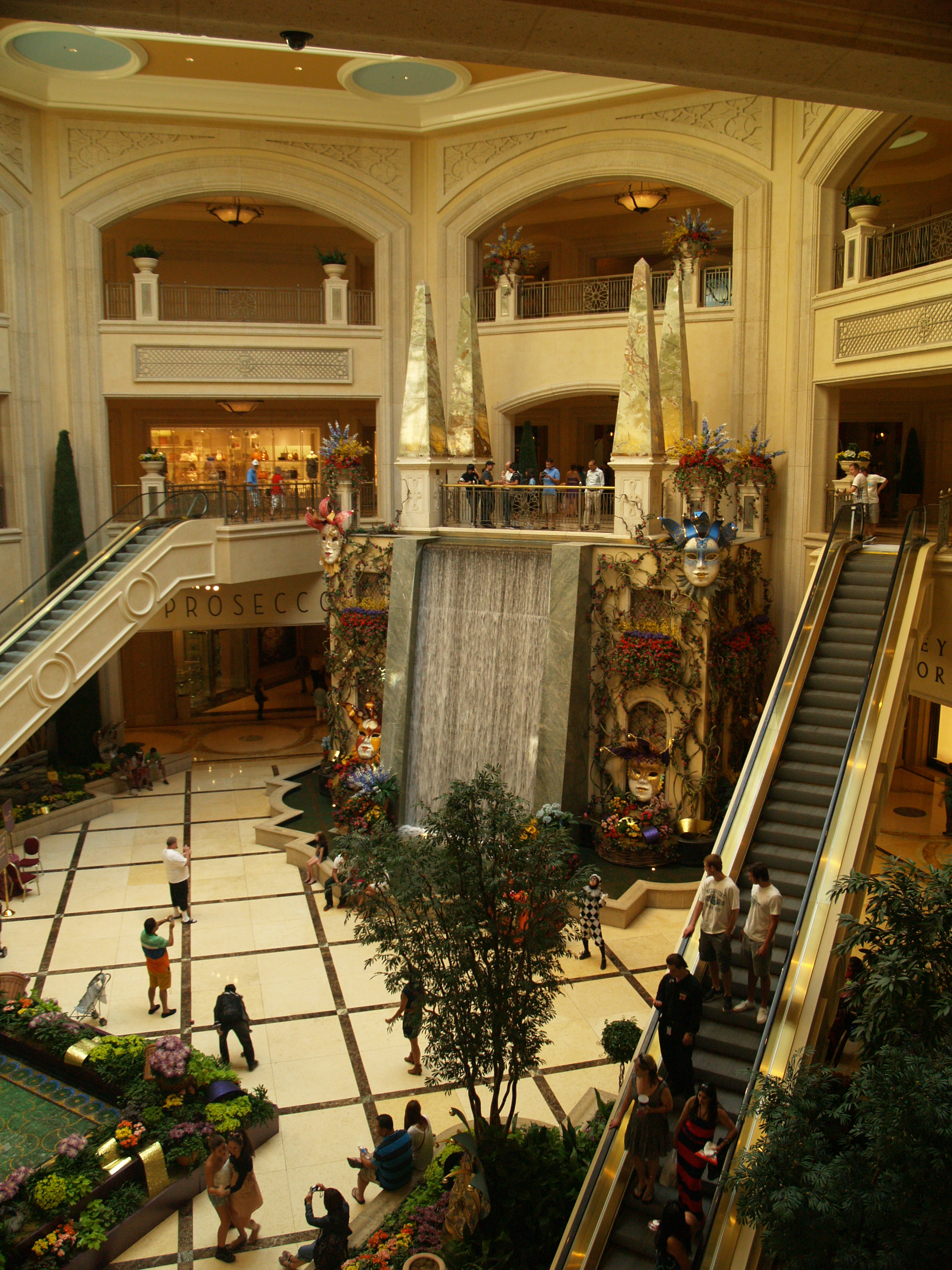
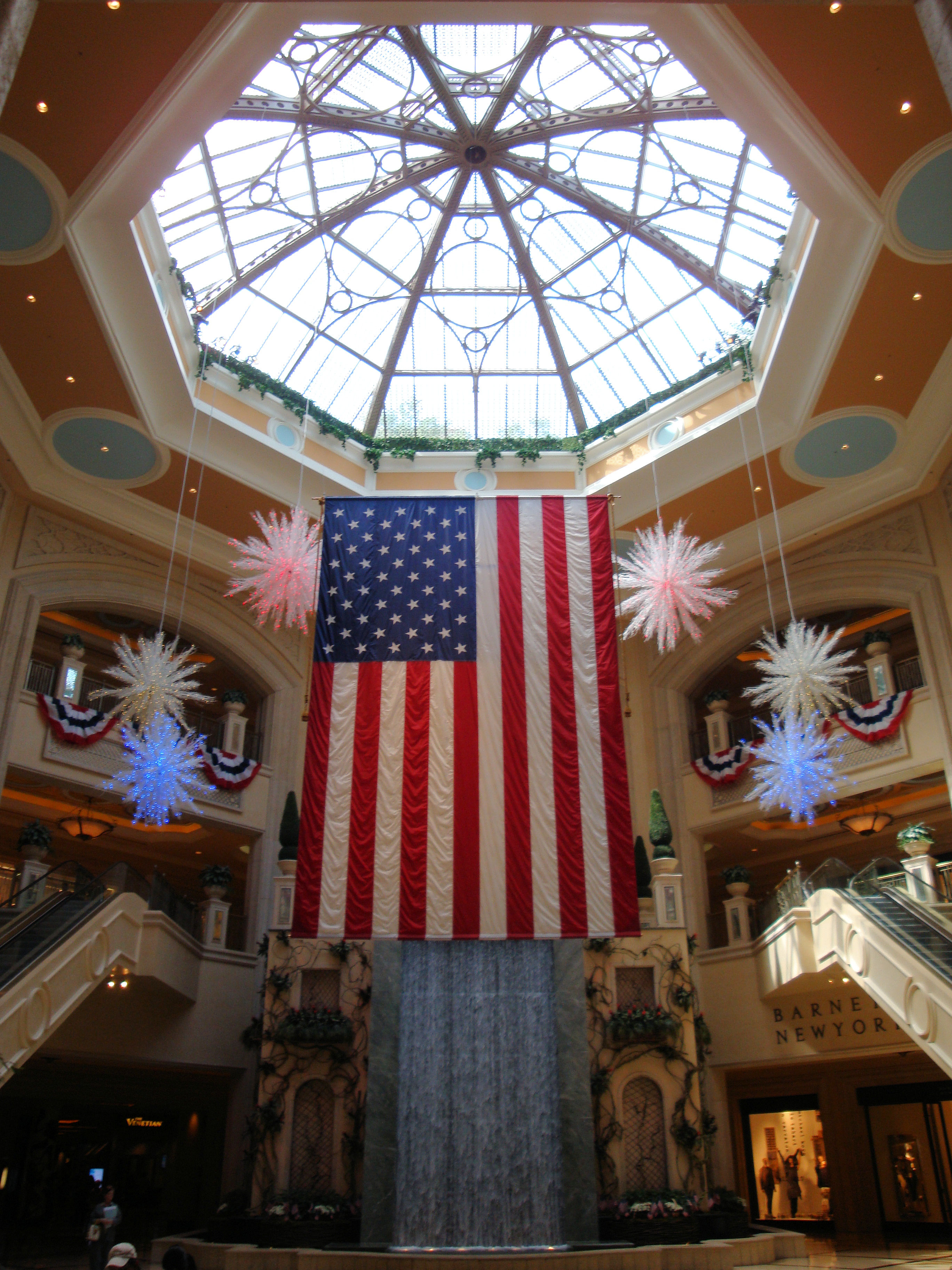
The Palazzo's Waterfall Atrium

The Palazzo covers 7,500,000 square feet (700,000 m^{2}). It includes 105,000 sq ft (9,800 m^{2}) of gaming space. Like the Venetian, the Palazzo is an all-suite hotel. It has 3,066 rooms. The 50-story hotel tower rises 642 ft (196 m), and was briefly the tallest building in Nevada upon opening. The 67-story Fontainebleau Las Vegas was topped out later in 2008 and opened in 2023.

The resort was designed by HKS Architects. Unlike the Venetian, the Palazzo features only a minimal Italian theme and has a more modern design. According to HKS, "The owners didn't really want a themed property like The Venetian. The idea was to create an upscale building using Rodeo Drive, Bel-Air and Beverly Hills as inspiration". The Palazzo was constructed as a green building, incorporating energy and water-saving methods in its design. In 2008, the resort received Silver LEED certification from the U.S. Green Building Council, becoming the largest LEED-certified building in the world.

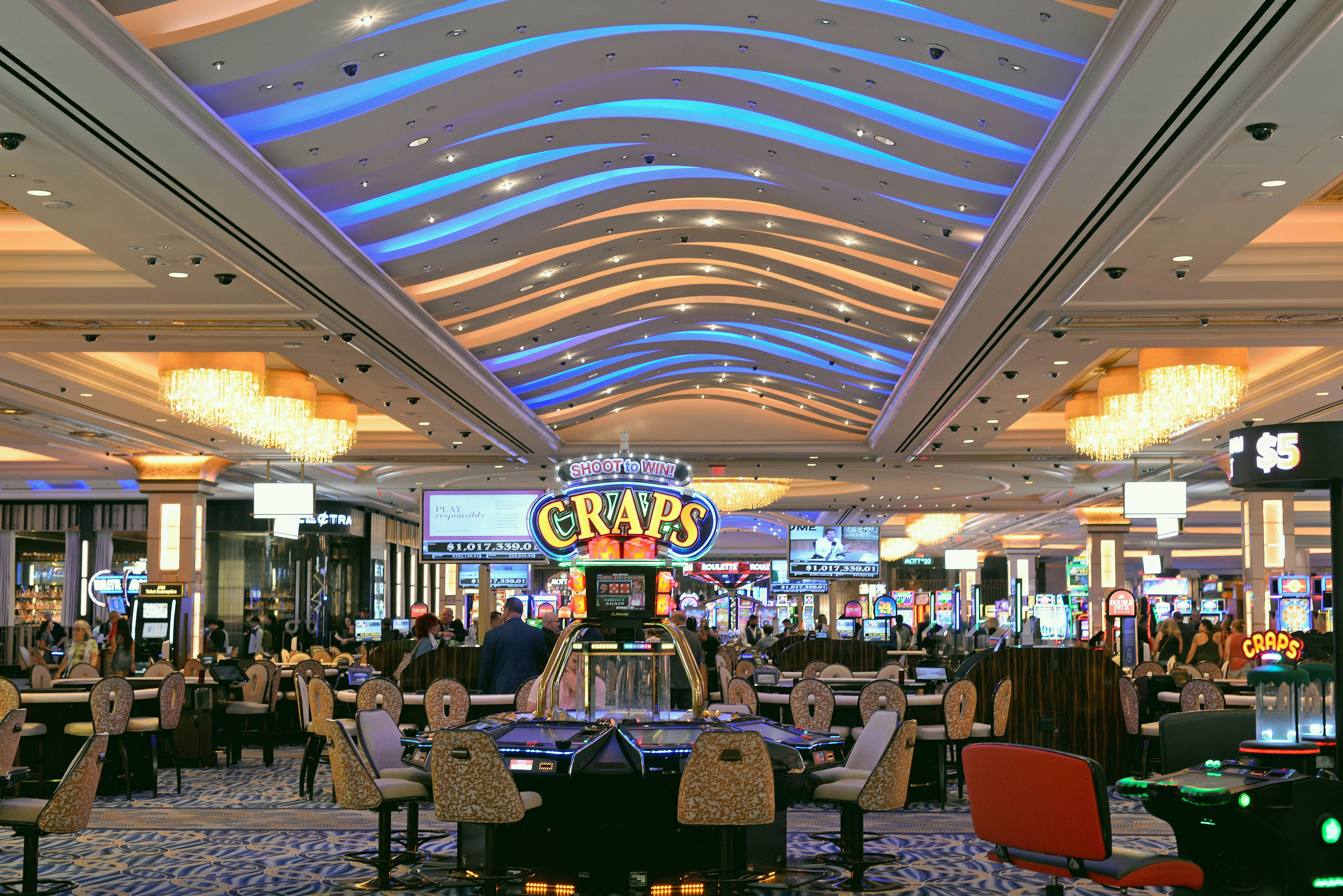
Casino floor in 2022

The Palazzo includes a shopping mall, the Grand Canal Shoppes, which connects with the Venetian. The Palazzo also includes the Waterfall Atrium, which features seasonal decorations overseen by a team of gardeners, horticulturalists, and landscapers. The decorations are exhibited for free, and themes include Chinese New Year, Fourth of July, autumn, and Christmas. The atrium competes with the Bellagio Conservatory. In its first year, the atrium also hosted a free show, The Living Garden, which featured actors dressed as statues and grapevines.

Rosina, a 65-seat lounge with an Art Deco design, opened in 2017, as part of a two-year renovation which included the casino floor and hotel rooms. Completed in 2018, the project included the addition of colored lighting on the casino's ceiling, and the new Electra Cocktail Lounge.

=== Restaurants and clubs ===
The Palazzo initially featured more than a dozen restaurants, from chefs such as Wolfgang Puck, Charlie Trotter, and Guy Savoy. Upon opening, notable restaurants included Grand Lux Cafe, Chinese restaurant Woo, and Mexican restaurant Dos Caminos. 40/40 Club, a sports bar and restaurant by rapper Jay-Z, opened along with the casino. It closed less than nine months later, and was replaced in 2009 by Lagasse's Stadium, a new sports bar and restaurant from chef Emeril Lagasse.

In August 2008, the resort added Lavo, a restaurant and nightclub designed to resemble a bathhouse. Adelson had wanted the business opened sooner, blaming its developers for repeated delays brought on by redesigns. He had terminated the nightclub's lease in March 2008, stating that the failure to open on time resulted in poor business for the resort. A legal battle ensued and continued after the club's opening, eventually being settled in 2009.

Woo closed in 2010, and Dos Caminos closed the following year, amid a lease disagreement with Las Vegas Sands. Table 10, another restaurant by Lagasse, featured mostly American food. It eventually closed in 2017. Lagassee's Stadium closed in 2020, due to the COVID-19 pandemic.

The resort had three steakhouses upon opening, including Carnevino by chef Mario Batali. After 10 years of operation, it closed in 2018, following sexual misconduct allegations made against Batali. In 2019, chef David Chang opened Majordomo Meat & Fish in its place. He opened a second, quick-service restaurant, Moon Palace, in 2020. Both of Chang's restaurants closed in 2022, and were replaced by new eateries from chef Eyal Shani. Japanese chef Tetsuya Wakuda opened his first U.S. restaurant in 2022, at the Palazzo.

=== St. Regis Residences ===
St. Regis Residences at the Venetian Palazzo, Las Vegas
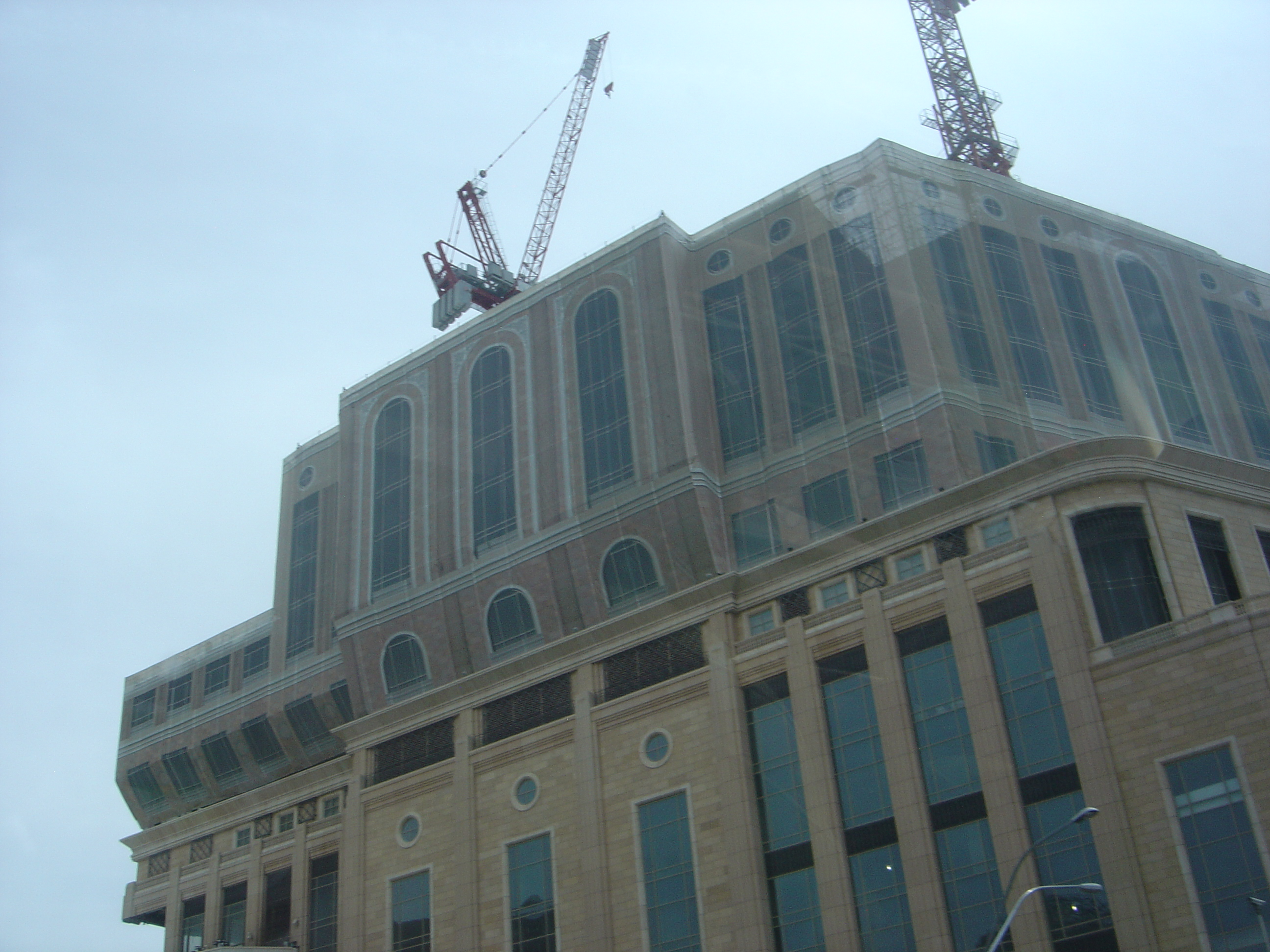
- St. Regis in 2020

General information
- Status: On hold
- Type: Condominiums
- Location: 3355 South Las Vegas Boulevard, Paradise, Nevada, United States
- Opened: March 2010 (planned)
- Cost: $600 million
- Owner: Vici Properties
- Operator: Apollo Global Management

Technical details
- Floor count: 50 (planned)

Other information
- Number of units: 398

The St. Regis Residences at the Venetian Palazzo, Las Vegas is an unfinished condominium tower at 3355 South Las Vegas Boulevard, between the Palazzo and the Venetian.

In November 2006, Las Vegas Sands sought approval from the Clark County Commission to construct a condominium tower on part of the Palazzo land. Construction of the $465 million tower began in early 2007, with condominium pre-sales expected to begin by September. The tower was built atop a 90,000 sq ft (8,400 m^{2}) retail building that was part of the Palazzo project. Both the retail building and tower were constructed on less than an acre of land, previously occupied by the Rosewood Grille restaurant. In September 2008, Las Vegas Sands and Starwood announced a partnership to open the tower as "The St. Regis Residences at the Venetian Palazzo, Las Vegas", named after the St. Regis Hotels & Resorts brand. The tower would include 398 units, and was expected to cost $600 million at that time. Under the deal, Starwood would manage the tower upon its opening, which was scheduled for March 2010.

In November 2008, Las Vegas Sands indefinitely suspended construction due to the Great Recession. An additional 18 months of work was needed to finish the project, which was to stand 50 stories high upon completion. In November 2009, Las Vegas Sands stated that work would remain suspended until the economy improved. In June 2011, Las Vegas Sands covered the unfinished building with a $1 million wrap made of giant cloth sheets that were printed to resemble a finished building. A company spokesman said that until a decision was made regarding the project, "We thought it was appropriate to improve it aesthetically in the meantime. We wanted it to look a little more like it belongs between a pair of five-diamond resorts like The Venetian and Palazzo." Michael Leven, president of Las Vegas Sands, had a view of the unfinished tower from his third-floor office, and later said: "I couldn't stand looking at that steel. One day I was out at the pool and I realized our guests were looking up and staring at the steel. We put the cover on it and it's held up well. You sometimes forget it is there if you walk by."

In April 2014, Leven said that money was no longer an issue in completing the project, stating, "It's not a financial decision anymore, but we want to do the right thing," referring to the ultimate use of the building. Because of uncertainty in the high-end, high-rise residential market, Leven stated that it was unlikely the tower would be completed as condominiums. Up to that time, Las Vegas Sands had considered finishing and opening the tower as timeshares, but Leven stated that "the numbers didn't work out". Leven further stated that finishing the tower as a third hotel-casino with its own entrance was unlikely. Also considered was finishing the tower as a hotel expansion for the Palazzo and Venetian.

== Live entertainment ==
The Palazzo's 1,800 seat theater opened in May 2008, with Jersey Boys as its headlining show. It ran until 2011. A Frank Sinatra tribute show opened in 2015, starring impressionist Bob Anderson. Clint Holmes also performed in the theater a year later.

A musical, Baz – Star Crossed Love, opened in the Palazzo Theatre in 2016. It was based on several films by director Baz Luhrmann, including Romeo + Juliet (1996), Moulin Rouge! (2001), and The Great Gatsby (2013). Baz closed in 2018, and the theater sat mostly vacant until the musical Six opened for a seven-week residency in 2023.

== Gallery ==
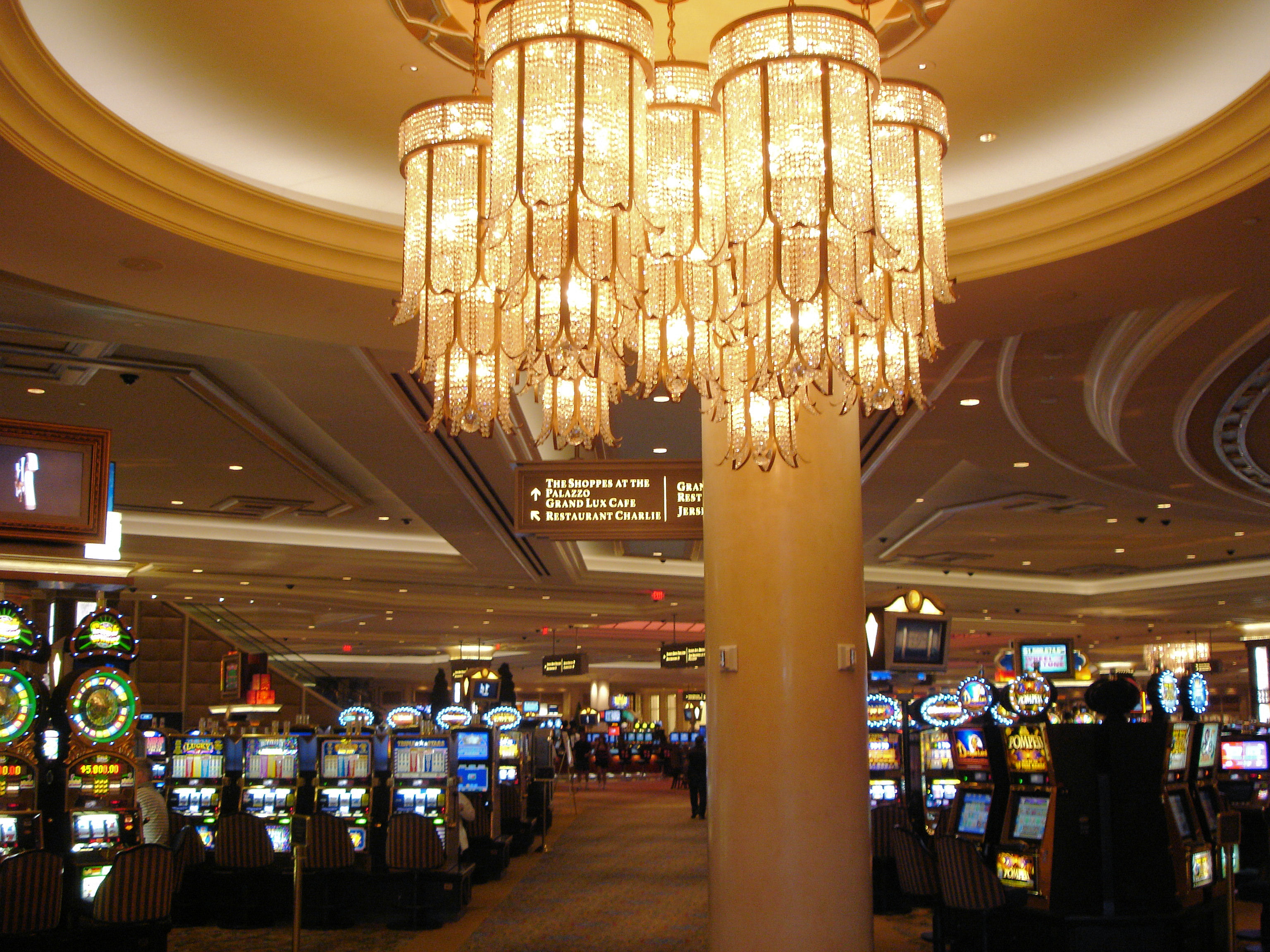
Casino floor in 2008

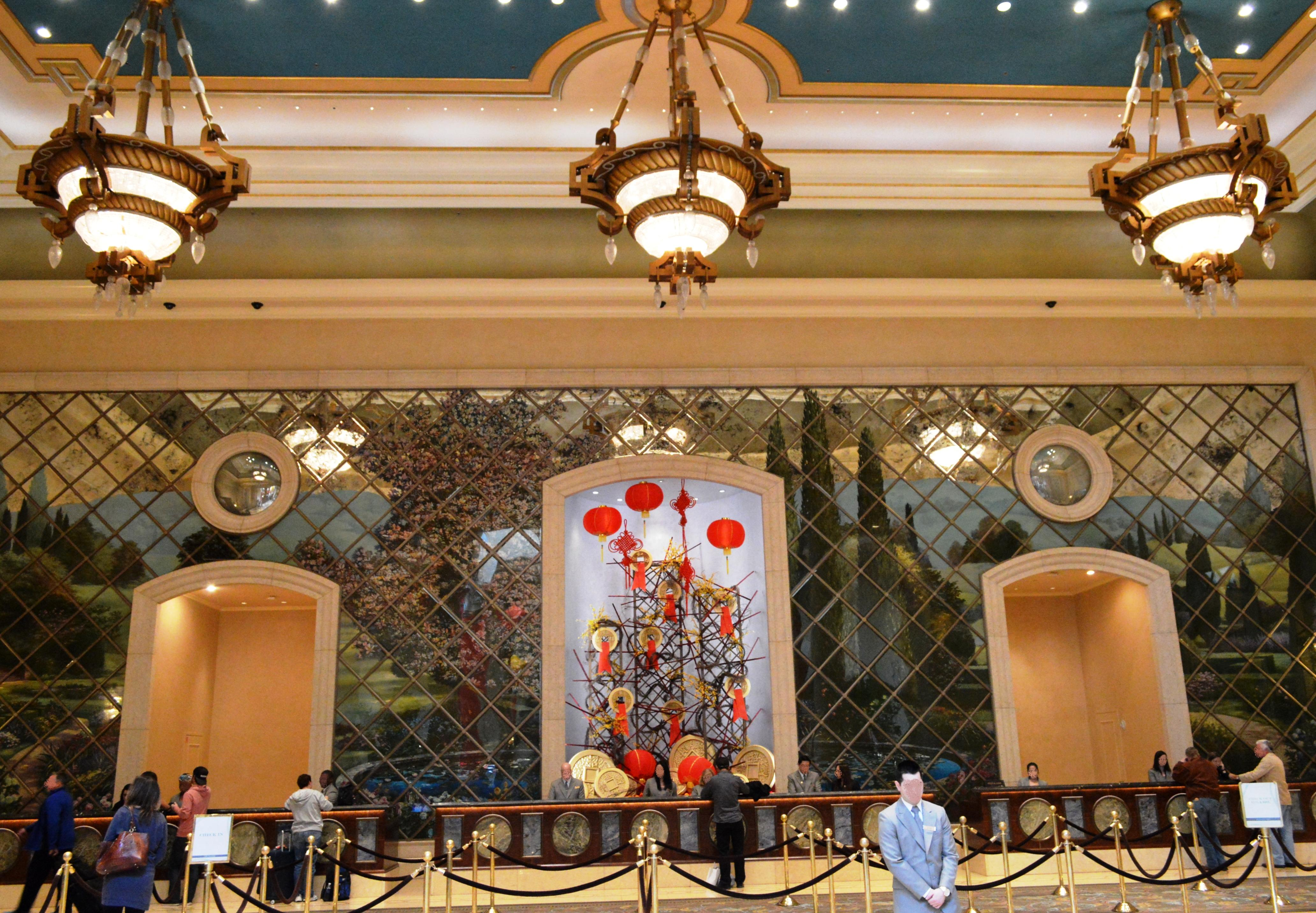
Hotel lobby

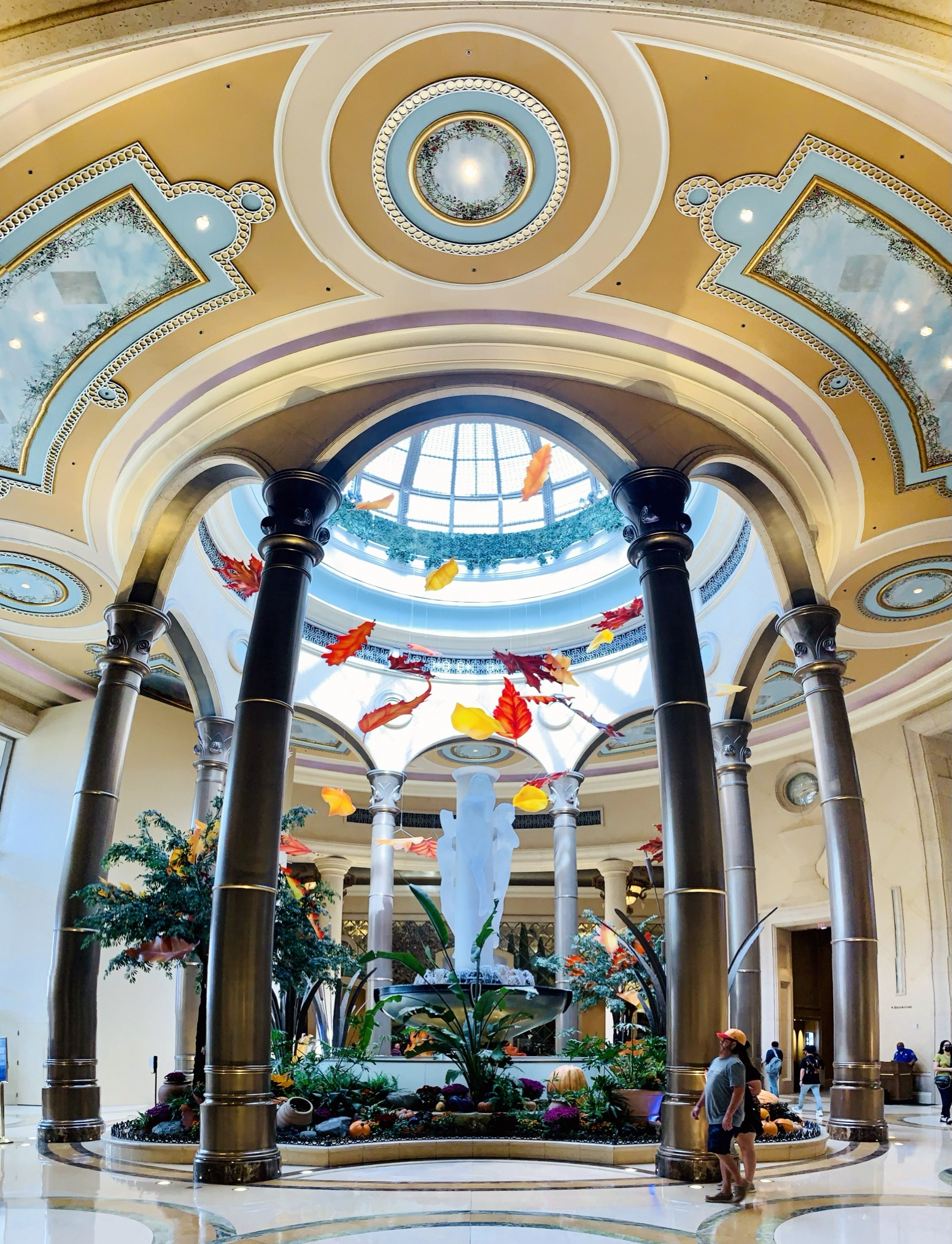
A 60 ft (18 m) dome in the hotel lobby.

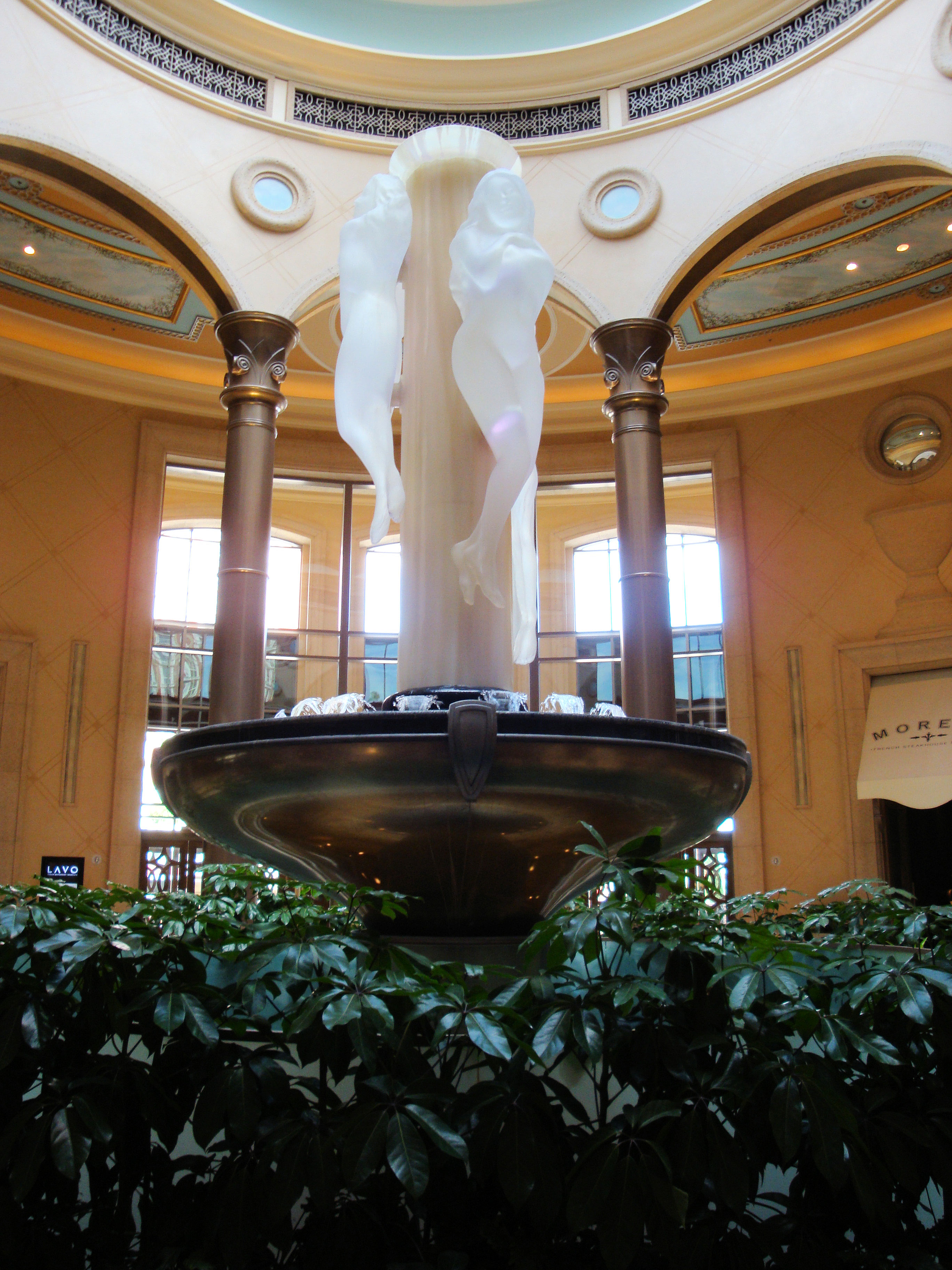
The Acqua di Cristallo fountain and sculpture, displayed in the dome until 2025.

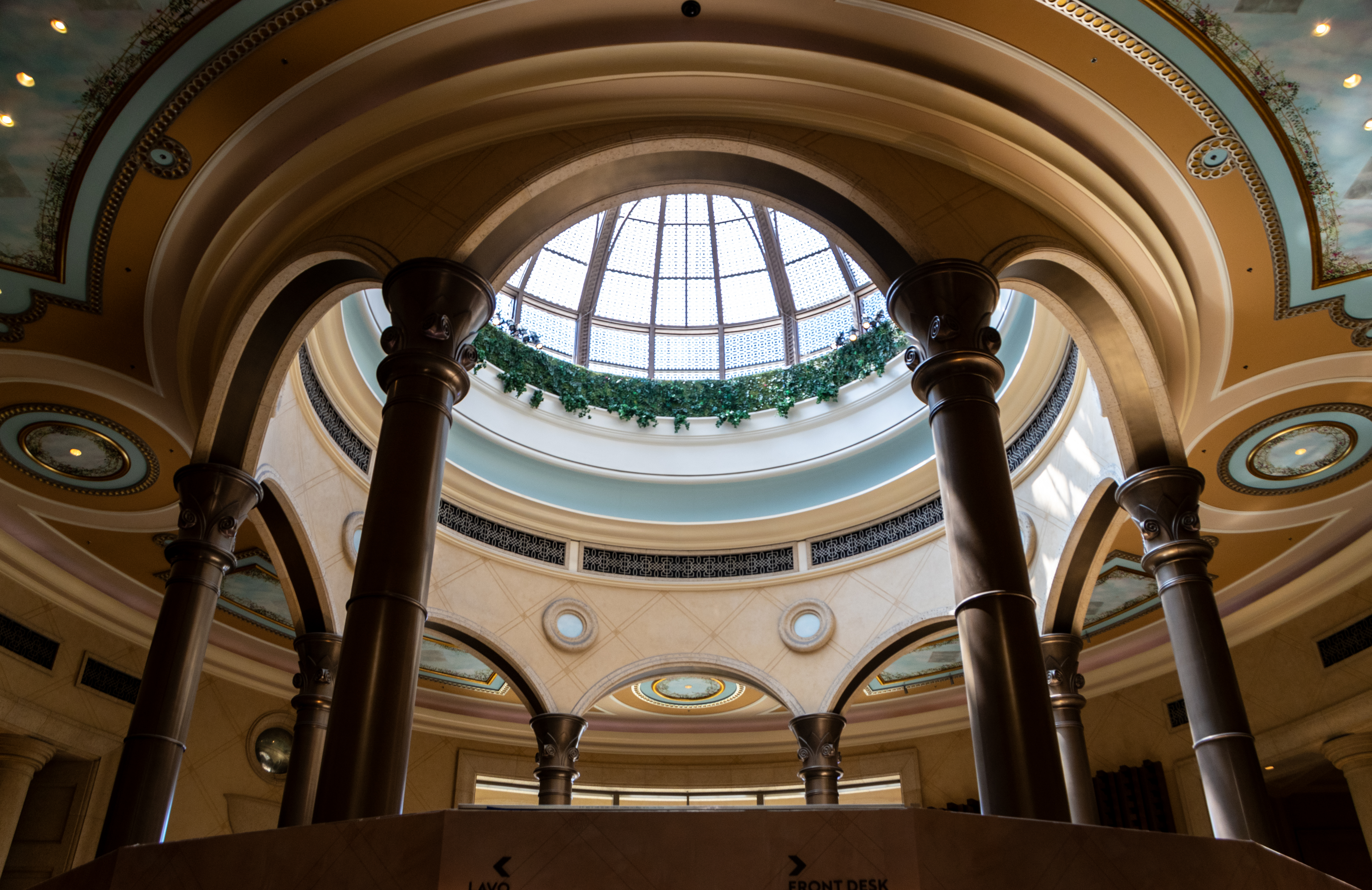
The dome in 2025

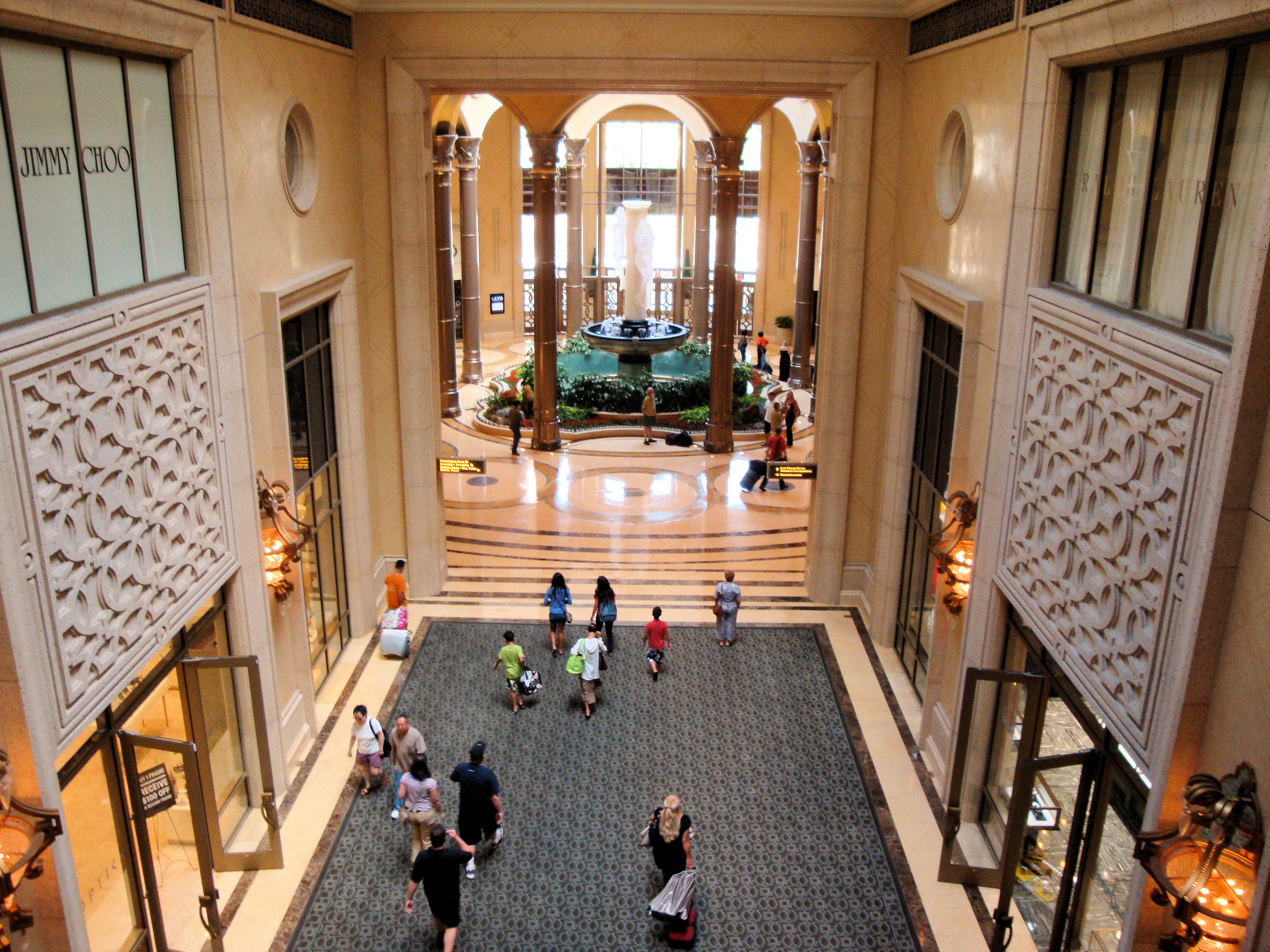
Retail area leading to the dome

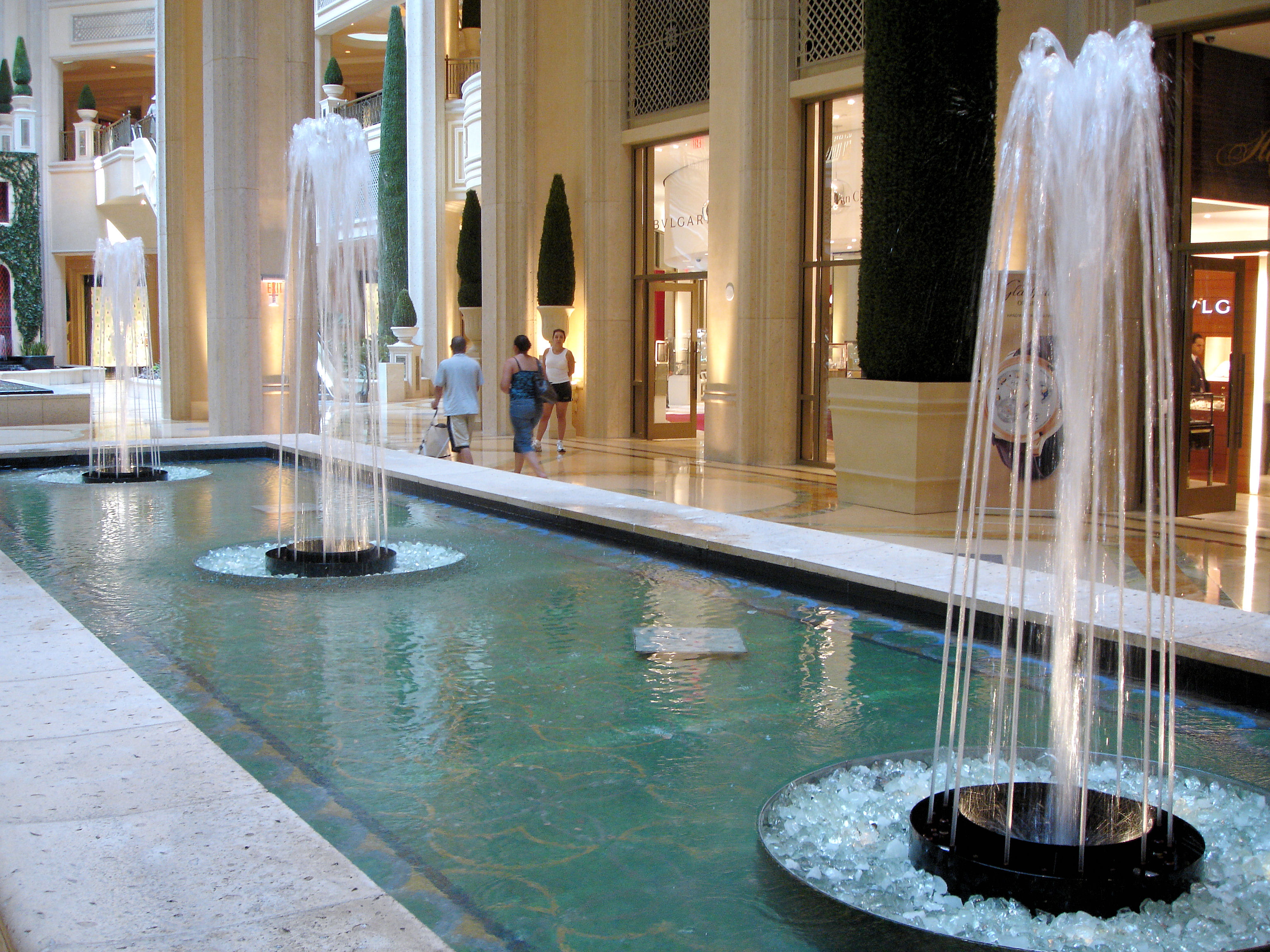
Fountains in the retail area

== See also ==
- List of tallest buildings in Las Vegas
- List of integrated resorts
