= Sergeant Rutledge =

1960 film by John Ford

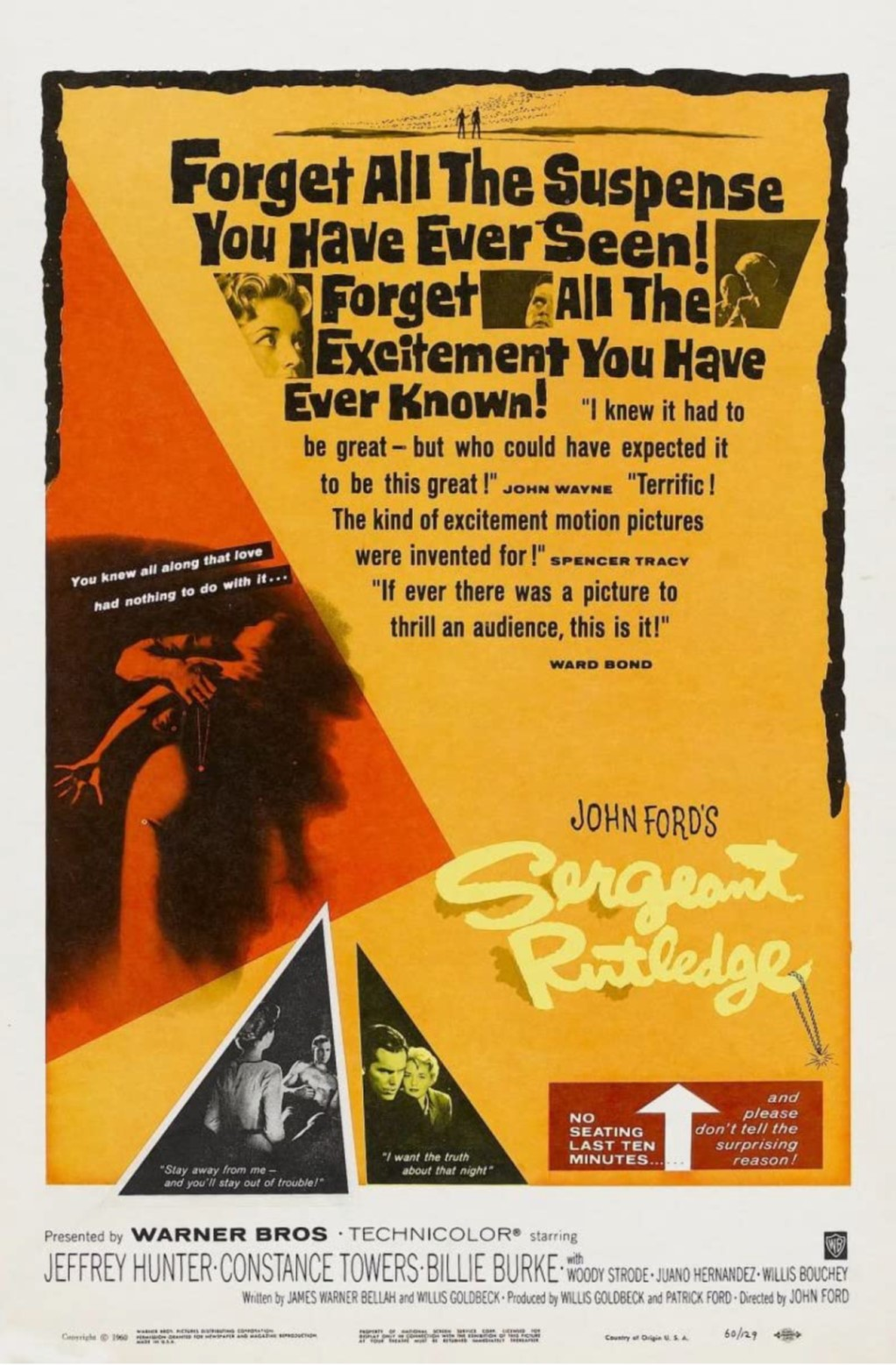
- One sheet theater poster (1960)
- Directed by: John Ford
- Written by: James Warner Bellah; Willis Goldbeck
- Produced by: Willis Goldbeck; Patrick Ford
- Starring: Jeffrey Hunter; Constance Towers; Billie Burke; Woody Strode; Juano Hernández; Willis Bouchey
- Cinematography: Bert Glennon
- Edited by: Jack Murray
- Music by: Howard Jackson
- Production company: John Ford Productions
- Distributed by: Warner Bros. Pictures
- Release dates: May 25, 1960 (New York); June 8, 1960 (Los Angeles)
- Running time: 111 minutes
- Country: United States
- Language: English

Sergeant Rutledge is a 1960 American Technicolor Western film directed by John Ford and starring Jeffrey Hunter, Constance Towers, Woody Strode and Billie Burke. The title was also used for the novelization published in the same year. The film continues to attract attention because it was one of the first mainstream American films to treat racism frankly and feature a Black actor.

The film stars Strode as Sergeant Rutledge, a Black first sergeant in a colored regiment of the United States Cavalry known as the Buffalo Soldiers. At a U.S. Army fort in the early 1880s, he is tried by a court-martial for the rape and murder of a White girl and the murder of the girl's father, who was the commanding officer of the fort. The events are recounted through several flashbacks.

== Plot ==
In 1881, Sergeant Braxton Rutledge of the 9th U.S. Cavalry, one of four colored regiments in the U.S. Army, is on trial for rape and murder. His defense is handled by Lt. Tom Cantrell, who is also Rutledge's troop officer. Through flashbacks, the trial witnesses describe the events following the murder of Rutledge's commanding officer, Major Custis Dabney, and the rape and murder of Dabney's daughter Lucy. Mary Beecher, a woman in whom Cantrell shows romantic interest, provides evidence in Rutledge's favor, noting that he had saved her life when Apache Indians were attacking.

Circumstantial evidence suggests that Rutledge committed the crimes, and his desertion after the killings appears to underscore his guilt. In a flashback, Cantrell finds Rutledge and arrests him, but Rutledge escapes captivity during an Indian raid. Aware of an impending ambush, he returns to warn his fellow cavalrymen and repels the attack alongside them.

A guilty verdict from the all-White military court appears inevitable, and the locals enjoy the spectacle. However, Cantrell extracts a confession while interrogating witness Chandler Hubble, the father of a man who was interested in Lucy, and Rutledge is exonerated. Cantrell and Beecher happily look forward to a life together.

== Cast ==
- Jeffrey Hunter as 1st Lt. Tom Cantrell
- Constance Towers as Mary Beecher
- Billie Burke as Mrs. Cordelia Fosgate
- Woody Strode as First Sergeant Braxton Rutledge
- Juano Hernández as Sgt. Matthew Luke Skidmore
- Willis Bouchey as Lt. Col. Otis Fosgate
- Carleton Young as Capt. Shattuck
- Judson Pratt as 2nd Lt. Mulqueen
- Chuck Hayward as Capt. Dickinson
- Rafer Johnson as Cpl. Krump
- Toby Michaels as Lucy Dabney (uncredited)
- Jack Mower as Courtroom Spectator (uncredited)
- Fred Libby as Chandler Hubble (uncredited)
- Chuck Roberson as Court-martial board member (uncredited)

== Production ==
Cover art for the paperback novelization of the screenplay for Sergeant Rutledge.

The screenplay for Sergeant Rutledge was written by the film's coproducer Willis Goldbeck and James Warner Bellah. After their screenplay was completed, Goldbeck and Bellah recruited John Ford as the director. Bellah had written the stories on which Ford based his "cavalry trilogy" of films: Fort Apache (1948), She Wore a Yellow Ribbon (1949) and Rio Grande (1950). The screenplay for Sergeant Rutledge was adapted by Bellah for a novel that was published in conjunction with the film's release.

The film's working titles were Captain Buffalo and The Trial of Sergeant Rutledge.

Parts of the film were shot in Monument Valley and the San Juan River at Mexican Hat in Utah.

== Release ==
For the 1960 domestic theatrical release of the film, a familiar marketing gimmick was employed in its advertisements: audience members were warned that they could not be seated during the final 10 minutes of the film in order to preserve its suspense. Some newspaper advertisements consisted of a fake classified ad reading: "Anyone with any information about what Sergeant Rutledge did, please contact Mary Beecher at CI.6-1000".

In Spain, the film was shown under the title of El Sargento Negro (The Black Sergeant), in France under the title Le sergent noir (The Black Sergeant) and in Italy under the title I dannati e gli eroi (The Damned and the Heroes).

== Reception ==
In a contemporary review for The New York Times, critic Howard Thompson wrote: "This is a good picture—thoughtful, well-acted, biting, interesting and stimulating—with the steady hand of an old pro like Mr. Ford evident every step of the way. Unfolding in picturesque color at a remote cavalry stockade on the craggy floor of the old Apache country, the drama remains strong, rather than powerful. ... 'Sergeant Rutledge' may not add up to Mr. Ford's finest hour (and a half), but it certainly is Mr. Strode's."

Critic Mildred Martin of The Philadelphia Inquirer wrote: "Unfortunately, this historically backgrounded Technicolor 'whodunit' ... has been weakened by a lamentably uneven script and, incredibly, by the tasteless, slipshod direction of multiple Oscar winner John Ford. Someone, certainly, should have reminded Ford that the spectacle of a man fighting for his life against racial prejudice, unjust accusation and a firebrand prosecutor was hardly a situation for comedy, especially the sort of comedy injected by Billie Burke and the officers of the court-martial."

The film fared poorly in American theaters, grossing $784,000 in the U.S. and $1.7 million elsewhere.

== Home media ==
A Region 1 DVD was released in 2006 in the United States as part of a set of films directed by John Ford. In 2016, the DVD was released individually. A VHS version had been released in 1988.

== See also ==
- Military history of African Americans
- Racism
- Expressionism in Cinema
