= James Warner Bellah =

American screenwriter (1899–1976)

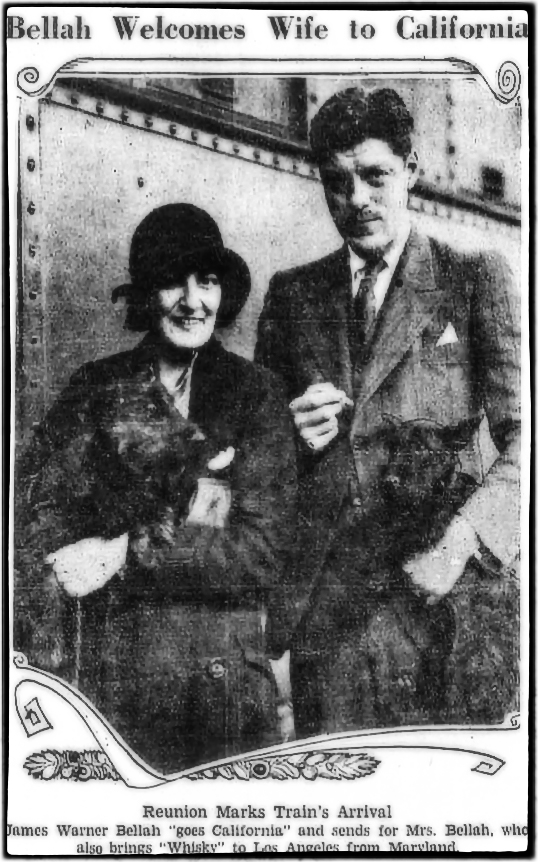
- Born: September 14, 1899; New York City, United States
- Died: September 22, 1976 (aged 77); Los Angeles, California, United States
- Education: Columbia University (BA); Georgetown University (MA)
- Occupations: Author; Screenwriter
- Spouse: Bernice Vere (m. 1928; div. 1932)
- Children: Ann Bellah Copeland; John Lasater Bellah; James Bellah; Stephen Bellah
- Writing career
- Language: English
- Genre: Western

James Warner Bellah (September 14, 1899 – September 22, 1976) was an American Western author from the 1930s to the 1950s. His pulp-fiction writings on cavalry and Indians were published in paperbacks or serialized in the Saturday Evening Post.

Bellah was the author of 19 novels, including The Valiant Virginian (the inspiration for the 1961 NBC television series The Americans), and Blood River. Some of his short stories were turned into films by John Ford, including Fort Apache, She Wore a Yellow Ribbon, and Rio Grande. With Willis Goldbeck he wrote the screenplays for Sergeant Rutledge (1960) and The Man Who Shot Liberty Valance (1962).

== Biography ==
Bellah earned his B.A. from Columbia University, where he was a member of the Philolexian Society, and his M.A. in history from Georgetown University.

In World War I, he enlisted in the Canadian Army, and served as a pilot in the 117th Squadron of Great Britain's Royal Flying Corps. These experiences formed the basis of his 1928 novel Gods of Yesterday.

For several years after the war, he was a writer for advertising firms and instructor in English at Columbia. In the 1930s he worked as a journalist for the New York Post.

During World War II, Bellah served in the United States Army, starting as a lieutenant in the 16th Infantry. He detailed to the General Staff Corps before Pearl Harbor, and was later assigned to Headquarters 1st Infantry Division, later with the 80th Infantry Division. Later he served on the staff of Admiral Lord Louis Mountbatten in Southeast Asia. He was attached to General Wingate's Chindits in combat in Burma, and to General Stillwell and to Colonel Cochran's 1st Air Commando Group. He left the service with the rank of colonel.

Bellah was a member of the Society of Colonial Wars in the State of California beginning in 1952.

His short story "Spanish Man's Grave" is considered by some to be one of the finest American Western stories ever written. His last script was A Thunder of Drums. His depiction of the Apache is protested by some and lauded as realistic by others.

In the early stages of his career, Elmore Leonard modelled his style closely after Bellah's writing.

Bellah died of a heart attack in Los Angeles during a visit to his friend James Francis, Cardinal McIntyre, Archbishop of Los Angeles. His manuscripts are stored at Columbia University and Boston University.

President Ronald Reagan was a fan of Bellah's books, and said, ″He was called the Kipling of America for writing of that great era in American history.″

== Novels ==
- These Frantic Years, New York: D. Appleton & Co., 1927
- The Sons of Cain, New York: D. Appleton & Co., 1928
- The Gods of Yesterday, New York: D. Appleton & Co., 1928
- Dancing Lady, New York: Farrar & Rinehart, 1932
- White Piracy, New York: Farrar & Rinehart, Inc., 1933
- The Brass Gong Tree, New York: Appleton-Century Co., 1936
- This is the Town, New York: Appleton-Century Co., 1937
- 7 Must Die, New York: Appleton-Century Co., 1938
- The Bones of Napoleon, New York: Appleton-Century Co., 1940
- Ward Twenty: a Realistic Novel, Garden City, N.Y.: Doubleday & Co., 1946
- Rear Guard, Popular Library (New York, NY), 1950 (first published as The White Invader in The Saturday Evening Post; the basis of the 1954 film The Command)
- The Apache, New York: Gold Medal Books, 1951 (first published as The Apache Curse in The Saturday Evening Post).
- Divorce, New York: Popular Library Books, 1952 (A shorter version was first published in April 1939 in cosmopolitan as You Marry Once!)
- Ordeal at Blood River, New York: Ballantine Books, 1959 (first published in The Saturday Evening Post)

== Novelizations ==
- Sergeant Rutledge, New York, Bantam Books, 1960, based on a screenplay by Bellah and Willis Goldbeck
- The Man Who Shot Liberty Valance, New York, Pocket Books, 1962, based on a screenplay by Bellah and Willis Goldbeck and the original story by Dorothy M. Johnson
- Thunder of Drums, New York, Bantam Books, 1961, based on a screenplay by Bellah

== Fort Starke, Civil War and other military stories ==
Fort Starke stories collected in Reveille, published by Fawcett Gold Medal in 1962, and Massacre, published by Lion in 1950:

- "Command", The Saturday Evening Post, June 8, 1946 (basis for A Thunder of Drums)
- "By the Beard of Saint Crispin", The Saturday Evening Post, August 3, 1946
- "West of the Paradise", The Saturday Evening Post, September 7, 1946
- "Massacre", The Saturday Evening Post, February 22, 1947 (basis for Fort Apache)
- "Spanish Man's Grave", The Saturday Evening Post, May 3, 1947
- "The Devil at Crazy Man", The Saturday Evening Post, June 21, 1947
- "Mission with No Record", The Saturday Evening Post, September 27, 1947 (basis for Rio Grande)
- "Lash of Fear", The Saturday Evening Post November 8, 1947
- "Big Hunt", The Saturday Evening Post, December 6, 1947 (basis for She Wore a Yellow Ribbon)
- "The Last Fight", The Saturday Evening Post, October 16, 1948
- "Stage for Elkhorn", The Saturday Evening Post, November 20, 1948

Collected only in Massacre:

- War Party, The Saturday Evening Post, June 19, 1948 (basis for She Wore a Yellow Ribbon)

Flint Cohill also appears in Ordeal on Blood River, Bellah's final serial for The Saturday Evening Post, published October 17, October 24, October 31, November 7, and November 14, 1959, and published in paperback by Ballantine in 1959.

Civil War stories:

- "Tales of the Valorous Virginians: First Blood at Harper's Ferry", The Saturday Evening Post, May 9, 1953
- "Tales of the Valorous Virginians: Stuart's Charge at Bull Run", The Saturday Evening Post, May 16, 1953
- "Tales of the Valorous Virginians: Slaughter at Ball's Bluff", The Saturday Evening Post, May 23, 1953
- "Tales of the Valorous Virginians: Jackson Got Licked at Kernstown", The Saturday Evening Post, May 30, 1953
- "Tales of the Valorous Virginians: How Stonewall Came Back", The Saturday Evening Post, June 6, 1953
- "Tales of the Valorous Virginians: The Secret of the Seven Days", The Saturday Evening Post, June 13, 1953

Collected in The Valiant Virginians, published by Ballantine in 1953.

Other military stories collected in Fighting Man USA:

- "Spanish Man's Grave", The Saturday Evening Post, May 3, 1947
- "Day of Terror", The Saturday Evening Post, November 17, 1956
- "While the General Slept", The American Magazine, March 1939
- "The Heart of Guinevere", The Saturday Evening Post, December 14, 1935
- "Fear", The Saturday Evening Post, November 6, 1926, Bellah's debut in that publication
- "Pirate of Nantucket", The Saturday Evening Post, June 27, 1942
- "Death of an Admiral", Cosmopolitan, July 1961
- "Soldier's Boy", The Saturday Evening Post, November 23, 1957

Collected in There Will Be War (Jerry Pournelle, ed.), published by Tor in 1986:

- "Spanish Man's Grave", The Saturday Evening Post, May 3, 1947

This was the only non-science fiction story in this anthology about future war.

== Screenplays ==
- This is Korea (1951)
- Ten Tall Men (1951)
- The Sea Chase (1955)
- Target Zero (1955)
- Command (1958 television pilot)
- Sergeant Rutledge (1960)
- A Thunder of Drums (1961)
- X-15 (1961)
- The Man Who Shot Liberty Valance (1962)
