= Armored Command =

1961 film by Byron Haskin

- Original film poster
- Directed by: Byron Haskin
- Written by: R.W. Alcorn
- Produced by: Ron W. Alcorn
- Starring: Howard Keel
- Cinematography: Ernest Haller
- Production company: Allied Artists
- Distributed by: Warner Bros-Pathe
- Release date: July 9, 1961
- Running time: 99 minutes
- Country: United States
- Language: English
- Budget: $1,000,000

Armored Command is a 1961 American war drama film directed by Byron Haskin, and starring Howard Keel and Tina Louise with Burt Reynolds in a small role.

"It was the one picture that Howard Keel didn't sing on", reminisced Burt Reynolds later. "That was a terrible mistake."

== Plot ==
The Germans use a female spy to infiltrate an American position to get information on the movement of troops at the height of the Ardennes offensive, the start of the Battle of the Bulge.

== Cast ==
- Howard Keel as Colonel Devlin
- Tina Louise as Alexandra Bastegar
- Warner Anderson as Lieutenant Colonel Wilson
- Earl Holliman as Mike
- Carleton Young as Captain Bart Macklin
- Burt Reynolds as "Skee"
- James Dobson as Arab
- Marty Ingels as "Pinhead"
- Clem Harvey as "Tex"
- Maurice Marsac as Jean Robert
- Lieutenant Colonel Thomas A. Ryan as Major
- Peter Capell as Little General
- Charles Nolte as Captain Swan
- Brandon Maggart

== Production ==
According to the film's director, Byron Haskin, writer-producer Ron Alcorn had made a TV series in Germany called Citizen Soldier and "had some kind of hold over some high muckamuck general... this general had sent through his permission to give Alcorn everything he wanted and Alcorn used all the tanks and ammunition and soldiers for nothing" on Citizen Soldier. This deal still applied during the making of what would become Armored Command.

Haskin said Alcorn researched the Battle of the Bulge at the Library of Congress, and used some real incidents to create a story which he turned into a script. Alcorn then used his deal with the general to secure finance via Allied Artists.

Adamson hired Haskin to direct. Haskin said "I didn't like the thing in the first place. I took it as a breadwinner - when you get low on dough you've got to take a picture." He felt "the screenplay was somewhat amateurish but I figure I could make corrections."

The movie was filmed in Munich and Hohenfels, Bavaria, but takes place in the Vosges Mountains during the Eastern France campaign of World War II. Filming started on 21 November 1960. Howard Keel directed some second unit.

Lt. Col. Thomas A. Ryan, who appeared in the film as the Major, also acted as the film's technical advisor.

About 150 American soldiers stationed in Germany were assigned to duty on the film, without pay. Alcorn explained, "We contribute to unit funds.”

Haskin said that when the unit returned to the US he was taken off the film, which was cut by Walter Hannemann of Allied Artists. Haskin claims all the humour in the movie was removed.

== Reception ==
The Los Angeles Times called the film "fairly good but it could have been better. A kind of poor man's Battleground." The New York Times called it an "improbable little melodrama".

Variety felt the attempts to combine melodrama and war story "doesn't jell" and called the film "a bit shopworn, sluggish and disjointed for the average war picture buff."

Haskin said "the picture didn't make any money; I often wonder why."

== Lawsuit ==
Major General Daniel H. Hudelson (retired), who commanded the 40th California National Guard in Korea and fought in the Battle of the Bulge, sued Allied Artists and Ronald Alcorn for $350,000 alleging unauthorized use of his story ideas. He claimed in 1955 he sent a tape recording of his experiences in the Vosges Mountains in France to a film company, and said they used his ideas in the film. He claimed the film had earned profits of $1.5 million.

== Notes ==
- Adamson, Joe (1984). Byron Haskin. A Directors Guild of America Oral History. Metuchen: Directors Guild of America.
