= J. Edward McKinley =

American actor (1917–2004)

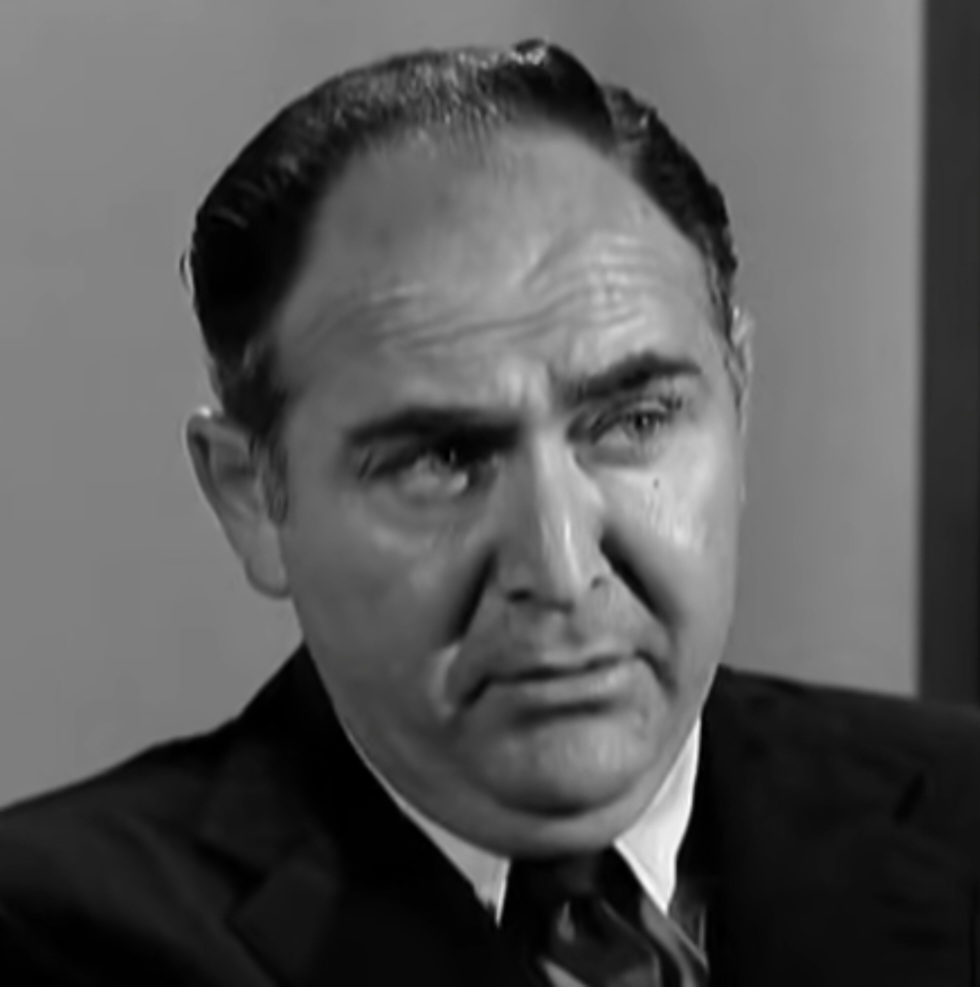
- McKinley in an episode of One Step Beyond (1959)
- Born: James Edward McKinley; October 11, 1917; Seattle, Washington, U.S.
- Died: July 30, 2004 (aged 86); Beverly Hills, California, U.S.
- Resting place: Holy Cross Cemetery, Culver City, California
- Occupation: Actor
- Years active: 1959–1986

James Edward McKinley (October 11, 1917 – July 30, 2004) was an American character actor. He frequently played authority figures, including lawmen or medical personnel.

== Career ==
McKinley was born in Seattle, Washington. He got his early break in Hollywood in the late 1950s, when he began appearing in episodes of many television series. His film work included Advise & Consent, The Angry Red Planet, A Thunder of Drums, the abortion drama The Case of Patty Smith, and Blake Edwards' comedy The Party (1968), in which he played Fred Clutterbuck, the studio head and party host.

Airing on 3/16/1965, the episode "By The Numbers, Paint!" of the 1960s American Television series McHale's Navy, McKinley plays visiting Senator Duncan. (1965 - Season 3, Episode 26 ) Other notable Television roles included parts on The Donna Reed Show, Hazel, Bewitched, The Andy Griffith Show, Surfside 6, Sugarfoot, Ben Casey, 77 Sunset Strip, Perry Mason, Ironside, Marcus Welby, M.D., The Rockford Files, Eight Is Enough, Bret Maverick, Little House on the Prairie, The Wild Wild West, and in 1986 Highway to Heaven, his final appearance.

== Death ==
McKinley died in Beverly Hills, California and is buried at Holy Cross Cemetery in Culver City, California.

== Partial filmography ==
- You Bet Your Life (1956) - Contestant
- The Big Circus (1959) - Circus Performer (uncredited)
- The Angry Red Planet (1959) - Prof. Paul Weiner
- The Walking Target (1960) - Warden John B. Haggerty (uncredited)
- Cimarron (1960) - Beck (uncredited)
- A Fever in the Blood (1961) - Joe Whelan (uncredited)
- Ada (1961) - Robert Keely (uncredited)
- A Thunder of Drums (1961) - Capt. Alan Scarborough
- The George Raft Story (1961) - Studio Head (uncredited)
- Window on Main Street (1961, TV series) - Tom Rafferty (episode "Day in the Life of the Editor")
- Patty (1962) - Dr. Miller
- Advise & Consent (1962) - Senator Powell Hanson
- The Interns (1962) - Dr. Robert Bonny
- How the West Was Won (1962) - Auctioneer (uncredited)
- The Time Travelers (1964) - Raymond
- The Great Race (1965) - Chairman (uncredited)
- "The Andy Griffith Show" (1965) - Governor George C. Handley
- The Ghost and Mr. Chicken (1966) - Mayor Carlyle Preston (uncredited)
- The Street Is My Beat (1966) - Danby
- Batman (1967, TV series) - Mr. Flamm (year 2, episodes 47 and 48)
- The Last Challenge (1967) - John Grant (uncredited)
- The Ballad of Josie (1967) - Stokey (uncredited)
- The Party (1968) - Fred Clutterbuck
- The Impossible Years (1968) - Dr. Pepperell
- Charro! (1969) - Henry Carter
- My Dog, the Thief (1969) - the Golfer
- There Was a Crooked Man... (1970) - The Governor
- How Do I Love Thee? (1970) - Hugo Wellington
- Flap (1970) - Harris
- The Wacky Zoo of Morgan City (1970) - Councilman Parsons
- Where Does It Hurt? (1972) - Geo. Leffingwell, M.D.
- Airport 1975 (1974) - Passenger (uncredited)
- At Long Last Love (1975) - Billings
