= This Is Korea =

1951 US documentary film by John Ford

- Directed by: John Ford
- Written by: James Warner Bellah
- Distributed by: Republic Pictures
- Release date: 1951

This Is Korea is a 1951 American documentary film about the Korean War. It was directed by John Ford with a screenplay by James Warner Bellah.

It was released theatrically by Republic Pictures.

== Plot ==
The film features the exploits of US armed forces, notably the 1st Marine Division, 1st Marine Aircraft Wing, United States Seventh Fleet and US Army during the UN September 1950 counteroffensive, Second Battle of Seoul, UN offensive into North Korea and the Battle of Chosin Reservoir.
