= Joe Dakota (1957 film) =

1957 film by Richard Bartlett

- Theatrical release poster
- Directed by: Richard Bartlett
- Written by: William Talman; Norman Jolley
- Produced by: Howard Christie
- Starring: Jock Mahoney; Luana Patten; Charles McGraw; Barbara Lawrence; Claude Akins; Lee Van Cleef; Anthony Caruso; Paul Birch
- Cinematography: George Robinson
- Edited by: Fred MacDowell
- Music by: Irving Gertz; Henry Mancini; Hans J. Salter; Herman Stein
- Production company: Universal Pictures
- Distributed by: Universal Pictures
- Release date: October 27, 1957
- Running time: 79 minutes
- Country: United States
- Language: English

Joe Dakota is a 1957 American Western film directed by Richard Bartlett and written by William Talman and Norman Jolley. The film stars Jock Mahoney, Luana Patten, Charles McGraw, Barbara Lawrence, Claude Akins, Lee Van Cleef, Anthony Caruso and Paul Birch. The film was released on October 27, 1957, by Universal Pictures.

== Plot ==
A handsome, mysterious, and not exactly pleasant man reaches Arborville, an isolated oil-seeking community in California. He is seeking a former Indian scout named Joe Dakota who allegedly left the town after having sold real estate. Joe soon uncovers an unpleasant truth about the townsfolk and their oil well, which was built on the site of the Indian scout's farm. Also, a problem of attempted sexual assault is involved.

== Cast ==
- Jock Mahoney as The Stranger
- Luana Patten as Jody Weaver
- Charles McGraw as Cal Moore
- Barbara Lawrence as Myrna Weaver
- Claude Akins as Aaron Grant
- Lee Van Cleef as Adam Grant
- Anthony Caruso as Marcus Vizzini
- Paul Birch as Frank Weaver
- George Dunn as Jim Baldwin
- Steve Darrell as Sam Cook
- Rita Lynn as Rosa Vizzini
- Gregg Barton as Tom Jensen
- Anthony Jochim as Claude Henderson
- Jeane Wood as Bertha Jensen
- Juney Ellis as Ethel Cook
