= Luana Patten =

American actress (1938–1996)

Luana June Patten
- Born: July 6, 1938; Long Beach, California, U.S.
- Died: May 1, 1996 (aged 57); Long Beach, California, U.S.
- Occupation: Actress
- Years active: 1946–1970, 1988
- Spouses: John Smith (m. 1960; div. 1964) Jerry D. Mays (m. 1970; div. 1973)

Luana Patten (July 6, 1938 – May 1, 1996) was an American actress who appeared in films produced by Walt Disney Pictures, such as Song of the South (1946), Fun and Fancy Free (1947), and Melody Time (1948). Later in life, she played roles in television.

== Early years ==
Patten attended Burbank High School and Hollywood Professional School.

== Career and later life ==
At the age of three, Luana was a model and later was hired by Walt Disney. Patten made her first film appearance in the 1946 musical Song of the South with Bobby Driscoll. They also appeared together in Song of the South's sister film So Dear to My Heart.

In 1947, Luana appeared again, with Edgar Bergen, Charlie McCarthy, and Mortimer Snerd during the live action scenes in Fun and Fancy Free. She appeared with Bobby Driscoll in the Pecos Bill segment of Disney's Melody Time. When Patten came of age, she played Jody Weaver in Joe Dakota and Priscilla Lapham in Disney's 1957 Johnny Tremain. In 1958, Patten portrayed Elizabeth Buckley in the episode "Twelve Guns" of NBC's Cimarron City western television series. She and John Smith married on June 4, 1960, and divorced on December 4, 1964.

In 1959, Patten played Abbie Fenton in the episode "Call Your Shot" of Wanted: Dead or Alive, starring Steve McQueen. In that same year, she played Betty in "The Exploding Book", season 7, episode 21 of The Adventures of Ozzie and Harriet that aired on March 4, 1959; and she played Ruth in "The Ruth Marshall Story" season 3, episode 13 of Wagon Train that aired on December 30, 1959. Patten also appeared as Natalie Garner in "The Hunter Malloy Story" season 2, episode 16 of Wagon Train that aired on January 21, 1959. In the 1960 Season 2, Episode 13 of Rawhide "Incident Of The Druid Curse", she played a dual role of sisters Maeve and Mona Lismore. In 1960, Patten played Cathy, Rick's girlfriend, in "Rick's English Literature Class", season 8, episode 16 of The Adventures of Ozzie and Harriet and Libby Halstead in Vincente Minnelli's Home from the Hill. In 1966, she played saloon girl Lorna Medford in the episode "Credit for a Kill" of Bonanza. In 1966, Patten had a small part as Nora White, the new bride of Whitey in Follow Me, Boys!. She also appeared in A Thunder of Drums, and the Rawhide episode "Incident of the Druid Curse" on CBS. That year Patten also appeared on Perry Mason as defendant Cynthia Perkins in "The Case of the Scarlet Scandal". She also played Mindy McGurney in the television series F Troop, as the daughter of a candidate for mayor, season 2, episode 8, "The Ballot of Corporal Agarn" that aired on October 27, 1966. Patten appeared as various characters in three episodes of Dragnet between 1967 and 1970. She appeared in the Adam-12 "Log 94: Vengeance" that aired March 7, 1970. Patten then retired from the film and television industry except for a brief cameo in the 1988 film Grotesque.

== Death ==
Patten died in 1996 from respiratory failure at Long Beach Memorial Hospital, aged 57. She is interred in Forest Lawn Memorial Park in Long Beach, California.

== Filmography ==
Film
Title	Year	Role	Notes
Song of the South	1946	Virginia "Ginny" Favers	
Little Mister Jim	1947	Missey Choosey Glenson	
Fun and Fancy Free	1947	Herself	
Melody Time	1948	Herself	
So Dear to My Heart	1948	Tildy	
Rock, Pretty Baby	1956	Joan Wright	
Johnny Tremain	1957	Priscilla Lapham	
Joe Dakota	1957	Jody Weaver	
The Restless Years	1958	Polly Fisher	
The Restless Gun	1958	Episode "The Nowhere Kid"	
The Young Captives	1959	Ann Howel	
Home from the Hill	1960	Libby Halstead	
The Music Box Kid	1960	Margaret Shaw	
Go Naked in the World	1961	Yvonne Stratton	
The Little Shepherd of Kingdom Come	1961	Melissa Turner	
A Thunder of Drums	1961	Tracey Hamilton	
Shoot Out at Big Sag	1962	Hannah Hawker	
Follow Me, Boys!	1966	Nora White	
They Ran for Their Lives	1968	Barbara Collins	
Grotesque	1988	Old Lady	(final film role)

== Television ==
Year	Title	Role	Notes
1960	Rawhide	Maeve and Mona Lismore	S2:E12, "Incident of the Druid Curse"
1966	Bonanza	Lorna Medford	S8:E7, “Credit for a Kill”
1967	Dragnet	Angie	Episode 363

1970. Dragnet. Ruth Decker. S12:E20, "The Body" • appeared in "tales of wells fargo" season 2 episode 5 "the target" 1958
