= PanIQ Escape Room =

Hungarian-American escape room franchise

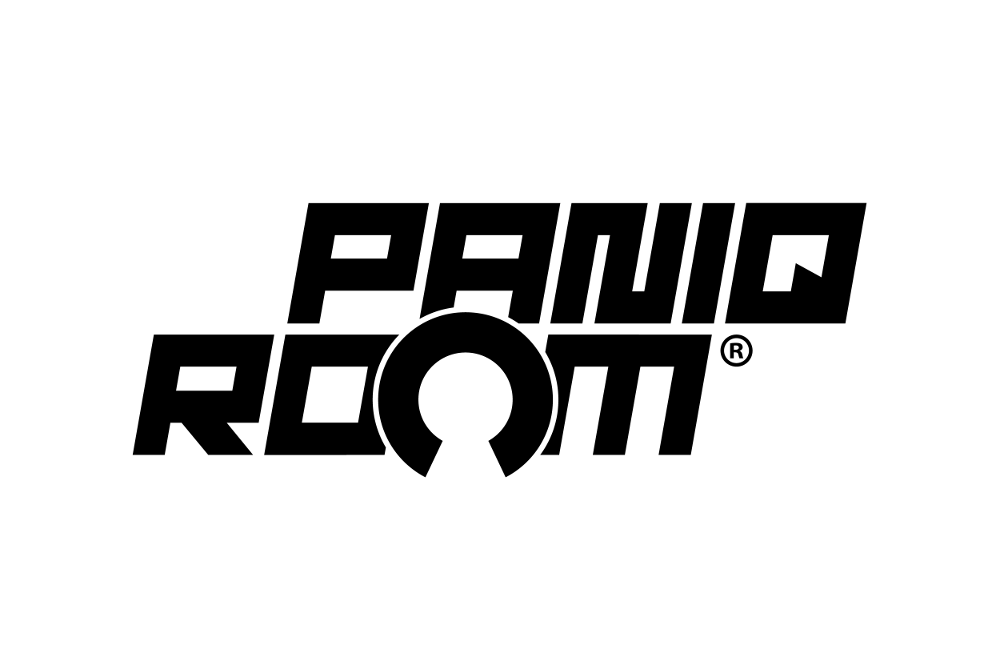
- Industry: Live amusement • Escape rooms
- Founded: 2014
- Headquarters: Los Angeles
- Number of locations: 20
- Area served: USA • Europe • Asia
- Key people: Ákos Gábossy (CEO)
- Products: Escape rooms • Drink bars
- Website: paniqescaperoom.com

PanIQ Escape Room also known as PanIQ Room is an escape room franchise created by PanIQ Entertainment. Conceived in Hungary and developed in the United States in 2014, PanIQ Room became the first international escape room chain with franchise disclosure documentation. As of November 2019, it had eighteen locations in the United States, Europe and Pakistan.

== History ==
After a couple of isolated precedents across the world, a significant number of escape rooms first appeared in Budapest in early 2011. They soon became the top-ranked tourist attraction of the city. One of them was Pániq Szoba, opened in March 2012 by Balázs Koltai and managed by him and Balázs Ureczky.

In order to turn the concept of Pániq Szoba into an international undertaking, several Hungarian entrepreneurs, including Ákos Gábossy, Patrik Horváth, Gábor Péteri and Patrik Strausz, partnered with the owners of Pániq Szoba to found PanIQ Escape Room in 2014. The company entered the U.S. market as PanIQ Entertainment with two themes in Hollywood. When the rooms turned out to be a success, they opened their second U.S. location in San Francisco with three rooms: The Prison, Psycho and Geek. In 2017, PanIQ Escape Room officially became the first international escape room franchise in the world. The company is still responsible for the project design of all the rooms.

In February 2016, a family-oriented MagIQ Room was opened in Beverly Hills, with three themes: Secrets of Wizardry, Pirate’s Den and Curse of the Mummy.

As of April 2022, PanIQ Escape Room has 17 escape room locations worldwide. In the U.S.: Atlanta (GA), Austin (TX), Boston (MA), 2 locations in Chicago (IL) - Logan Square and Fulton Market, Dallas (TX), Houston (TX), Las Vegas (NV),Miami (FL) in Wynwood and Miami Beach; NYC (NY); San Francisco (CA); and San Jose (CA). PanIQ Room’s flagship location on the Las Vegas Strip was opened in August, 2020. In Europe: Budapest (Hungary) as Neverland Bar & Escape Room; PanIQ Room Marseille (France); PanIQ Room Stockholm (Sweden). In Asia: PanIQ Room Islamabad (Pakistan) and PanIQ Room Lahore (Pakistan).

As of April 2022, the following PanIQ Escape Room venues are under construction: Atlantic City (NJ); Indianapolis (IN); Los Angeles (CA); Miami Beach (FL); Sacramento (CA); San Diego (CA); Seattle (WA). The original Pániq Szoba is still in operation, but they are no longer part of the franchise, along with an affiliate location in Sydney, Australia.

Recent expansion and development has been the result of a Series A venture capital investment from Hiventures in the amount of US$875,000 in August 2018.

PanIQ Escape Room is a member of the International Association of Amusement Parks and Attractions (IAAPA), International Franchise Professionals Group (IFPG), and International Franchise Association (IFA).

PanIQ Room acquired 40% of Indestroom in 2022, which is the biggest escape room prop and puzzle manufacturer in the world.

== Rooms ==
The general objective of participants in each room is the same: to find a way to get out before the time runs out.

In the Geek Room in Silicon Valley, startup employees are physically trapped in a room, with one hour to solve the puzzles. In 2016, the Geek Room was updated to add more drama, with players having to avoid explosives laid by their coked up boss. The San Francisco location also includes "Wizards" and "Medieval" rooms.. Other popular themes are The Wild West in Phoenix, The Mob in Chicago and The Perfect Crime in Washington D.C.

PanIQ's recently built rooms include: The Haunted Manor, The Time Machine, Zombie Outbreak, Atlantis Rising, Casino Heist, Cartel Crackdown, Wizard Trials. One of the first escape rooms in the US, their Insane Asylum room was first built in 2014, and its newer iterations opened in 2022.

In the US, PanIQ started with building first generation escape rooms in 2014, and in 2022, most of their rooms are GEN3. Also, the company has been working on a fourth generation room since 2020.
