= Ocean's 11 =

1960 heist film

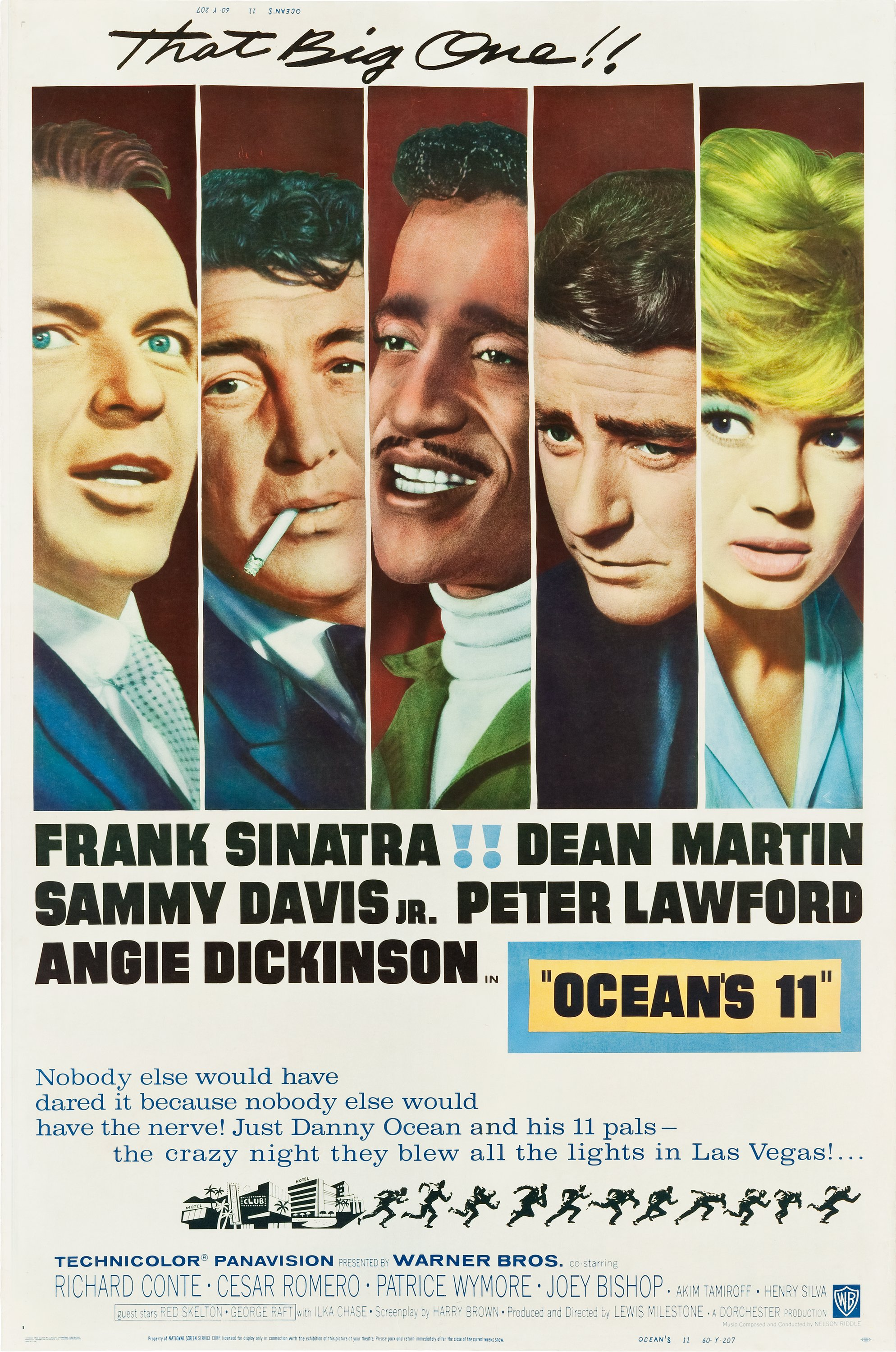
- Theatrical release poster
- Directed by: Lewis Milestone
- Screenplay by: Harry Brown; Charles Lederer
- Story by: George Clayton Johnson; Jack Golden Russell
- Produced by: Lewis Milestone
- Starring: Frank Sinatra; Dean Martin; Sammy Davis Jr.; Peter Lawford; Angie Dickinson; Richard Conte; Cesar Romero; Patrice Wymore; Joey Bishop; Akim Tamiroff; Henry Silva
- Cinematography: William H. Daniels
- Edited by: Philip W. Anderson
- Music by: Nelson Riddle
- Production company: Dorchester Productions
- Distributed by: Warner Bros. Pictures
- Release dates: August 3, 1960 (Las Vegas premiere); August 10, 1960 (United States)
- Running time: 127 minutes
- Country: United States
- Language: English
- Box office: $5.5 million

Ocean's 11 is a 1960 American heist film directed and produced by Lewis Milestone from a screenplay by Harry Brown and Charles Lederer, based on a story by George Clayton Johnson and Jack Golden Russell. The film stars an ensemble cast and five members of the Rat Pack: Frank Sinatra, Dean Martin, Sammy Davis Jr., Peter Lawford, and Joey Bishop. Centered on a series of Las Vegas casino robberies, the film also stars Angie Dickinson, Richard Conte, Cesar Romero, Patrice Wymore, Akim Tamiroff, and Henry Silva. It includes cameo appearances by Shirley MacLaine, Red Skelton, and George Raft.

Ocean's 11 premiered in Las Vegas on August 3, 1960, and was theatrically released in the United States on August 10 by Warner Bros. Pictures. The film received mixed reviews from critics. It originated the Ocean's film series.

== Plot ==
World War II veterans Danny Ocean and Jimmy Foster recruit nine comrades from their unit in the 82nd Airborne Division to simultaneously rob five Las Vegas casinos: the Sahara, the Riviera, the Desert Inn, the Sands, and the Flamingo.

The gang plans the elaborate New Year's Eve heist precisely like a military operation. Josh Howard takes a job as a sanitation worker driving a garbage truck while others get jobs at the various casinos. Sam Harmon entertains in one of the hotel's lounges. Demolition charges are planted on a local electric power transmission tower and the backup electrical systems are covertly rewired in each casino to open the cashier cages instead of powering the emergency lights when the automatic generator kicks in. At midnight on New Year's Eve, the tower is blown up and the Las Vegas Strip goes dark; the men sneak into the money cages, hold up the cashiers, and dump their collection bags into the hotels' garbage bins. They then go back inside the casinos and mingle with the crowds before departing as soon as the lights turn back on. A garbage truck driven by Josh picks up the bags and passes through the police blockade. Everything appears to have gone off without a hitch.

The gang's electrician, Tony Bergdorf, suffers a fatal heart attack in the middle of the Strip. This raises police suspicions, who wonder if there is any connection to the thefts. Reformed mobster Duke Santos offers to recover the casino bosses' money for a percentage. As the robbery was well organized, he assumes that it was a Mafia operation until his underworld connections deny any involvement. Duke is engaged to Foster's mother, who casually mentions that Foster and Ocean, having fought together in the army, are both unexpectedly in Las Vegas. Duke also learns about Bergdorf's military record from the police. By the time that Bergdorf's body arrives at the mortuary, Duke has pieced it all together.

After Duke confronts the thieves, demanding half of their take, they desperately hide the money in Bergdorf's coffin, setting aside $10,000 for his widow Gracie. The group plans to take back the rest, making no payoff to Duke, after the coffin is shipped to San Francisco. Their plan backfires when the funeral director talks Gracie into having the funeral in Las Vegas. She has the body and coffin cremated along with all of the hidden cash.

== Cast ==
From left to right: Lester, Bishop, Davis, Sinatra, and Martin

=== Ocean's 11 ===
Danny Ocean, the titular character, collects a heist crew, consisting of these eleven members:

- Frank Sinatra as Danny Ocean
- Dean Martin as Sam Harmon
- Sammy Davis Jr. as Josh Howard
- Peter Lawford as Jimmy Foster
- Richard Conte as Tony Bergdorf
- Joey Bishop as "Mushy" O'Connors
- Henry Silva as Roger Corneal
- Buddy Lester as Vince Massler
- Richard Benedict as George "Curly" Steffans
- Norman Fell as Peter Rheimer
- Clem Harvey as Louis Jackson

=== Others ===
- Angie Dickinson as Beatrice Ocean
- Cesar Romero as Duke Santos
- Patrice Wymore as Adele Elkstrom
- Akim Tamiroff as Spyros Acebos
- Ilka Chase as Mrs. Restes
- Jean Willes as Gracie Bergdorf
- Hank Henry as Mr. Kelly, the mortician
- Lew Gallo as Jealous Young Man
- Robert Foulk as Sheriff Wimmer

=== Cameos ===
- George Raft as Jack Strager (Casino Owner)
- Red Skelton as Himself
- Shirley MacLaine as Inebriated woman (Martin's kisser)
- Red Norvo as Himself/Hotel Vibraphonist (Martin's band when he sings "Ain't That a Kick in the Head?")
- Shiva as snake dancer

== Production ==
Peter Lawford was first told of the film's basic premise by director Gilbert Kay, who had heard the idea from a filling station attendant. Lawford bought the rights in 1958, envisioning William Holden in the lead. Frank Sinatra became interested in the idea, and a variety of writers worked on the project. When Lawford first told Sinatra of the story, Sinatra joked, "Forget the movie, let's pull the job!"

The animated title sequence was designed by Saul Bass. The film's closing shot shows the main cast walking away from the funeral home, with the Sands Hotel marquee behind them, listing their names as headliners.

The Las Vegas portion of the film was shot on location at the Flamingo, Sands, Desert Inn, Riviera, and Sahara hotels. One segment was also filmed at the former Las Vegas Union Pacific station. According to Frank Sinatra Jr., the Rat Pack members were performing shows at 8pm and midnight during the production, so by the time the cast and crew were ready after the shows, much of the footage on location was shot between 3am and dawn.

== Music ==
Ocean's 11 is not a musical, but still has a few songs in it. "EEE-O-11" is the centerpoint song of the movie, being sung by Sammy Davis Jr. midway through and again at the end, as the end credits play. All songs were written by Sammy Cahn and Jimmy Van Heusen.

=== Songs ===
- "Ocean's 11 (Overture)" - Orchestra Conducted by Nelson Riddle
- "EEE-O-11" - Sammy Davis Jr.
- "Ain't That a Kick in the Head?" - Dean Martin
- "I'm Gonna Live 'Till I Die" - Casino Singers
- "EEE-O-11 (Finale)" - Sammy Davis Jr.

== Release ==
Ocean's 11 was released on videocassette by Warner Home Video on February 9, 1983, as part of its "A Night At the Movies" series, featuring a Hearst Metrotone Newsreel, the Warner Bros. animated short Person to Bunny, and a trailer for films of 1960. The film was released as a 50th-anniversary Blu-ray disc on November 9, 2010. The disc's bonus features include:

- Special commentary by Frank Sinatra Jr. and Angie Dickinson
- "Vegas Map" — mini-documentaries of the five casinos involved in the film
- Tonight Show clip of Angie Dickinson with Frank Sinatra as host from November 14, 1977
- "Tropicana Museum Vignette"

== Reception ==
The film received mixed reviews from critics. Bosley Crowther of The New York Times disliked the film because "there is no built-in implication that the boys have done something wrong. There is just an ironic, unexpected and decidedly ghoulish twist whereby they are deprived of their pickings and what seems their just deserts. This is the flaw in the picture — this and the incidental fact that a wholesale holdup of Las Vegas would not be so easy as it is made to look".

Variety wrote that the film was "frequently one resonant wisecrack away from turning into a musical comedy. Laboring under the handicaps of a contrived script, an uncertain approach and personalities in essence playing themselves, the Lewis Milestone production never quite makes its point, but romps along merrily unconcerned that it doesn't". Leo Sullivan of The Washington Post called the film "nothing more than a whopping sick joke in Technicolor ... It's a completely amoral tale, told for laughs".

Philip K. Scheuer of the Los Angeles Times wrote that the film "has a pretty good surprise twist at the finish and is, of its type, a pretty good comedy-melodrama". A mixed review in The Monthly Film Bulletin called it "an overlong, intermittently amusing picture full of surface effects and private jokes ... Despite Milestone's efforts, the first third tends to drag, due mainly to desultory characterisation, but when the raid begins both situations and dialogue improve considerably".

On Rotten Tomatoes, Ocean's 11 holds a "rotten" rating of 47%, based on 34 reviews, with an average rating of 5.4/10. The critical consensus reads: "Easygoing but lazy, Ocean's Eleven blithely coasts on the well-established rapport of the Rat Pack royalty". On Metacritic, it has a score of 57 out of 100 based on 6 critics reviews, indicating "Mixed or average reviews."

== See also ==
- List of films set in Las Vegas
