= Ocean's =

American heist film series

- Official film series logo
- Distributed by: Warner Bros. Pictures (Skydance)
- Country: United States
- Language: English
- Budget: $350 million (Total 4 films)
- Box office: $1.422 billion (Total 4 films)

Ocean's is a series of heist films. Beginning with the 1960 Rat Pack film Ocean's 11, the series has seen mixed to favorable critical reception and substantial commercial success. After the 1960 film, a remake trilogy directed by Steven Soderbergh was released from 2001 to 2007, often cited as defining its genre and leading to a proliferation and commercialization of heist films throughout the world. The most commercially successful film of the trilogy was the first, Ocean's Eleven (2001). It established the ensemble cast of George Clooney as Danny Ocean, Matt Damon as Linus Caldwell, and Brad Pitt as Rusty Ryan. A long list of supporting cast members maintain the trilogy. Its sequel, Ocean's Twelve, was released in 2004, with the final film, Ocean's Thirteen, following in 2007. An all-female spin-off titled Ocean's 8 was released in 2018.

== Origin ==
The Ocean's film series was inspired by and based on the 1960 heist film Ocean's 11. Directed by Lewis Milestone, with a script co-written by Harry Brown and Charles Lederer, from an original story and screenplay by George Clayton Johnson and Jack Golden Russell; the movie starred five of the Rat Pack: Peter Lawford, Frank Sinatra, Dean Martin, Sammy Davis Jr., and Joey Bishop.

== Films ==
=== Ocean's Eleven (2001) ===
Master thief Danny Ocean (George Clooney), just out of prison, plans an elaborate Las Vegas three-casino-heist to win back his ex-wife, Tess (Julia Roberts). To that end, he recruits ten other thieves and con men to pull off the complex job, eventually stealing US$160 million.

=== Ocean's Twelve (2004) ===
Ocean's crew is blackmailed by the casino owner they stole from, Terry Benedict (Andy Garcia), into paying him just over $198 million (their loot plus interest). The team is given two weeks to come up with the money so they travel to Europe to execute three heists.

=== Ocean's Thirteen (2007) ===
Ocean and his crew plan to rig a new casino's opening night to inflict ruinous losses after its ruthless owner Willy Bank (Al Pacino) double-crosses one of the gang, with plans to ruin his life.

=== Ocean's 8 (2018) ===
Soderbergh and George Clooney initially downplayed the possibility of an Ocean's Fourteen or subsequent sequels after Bernie Mac's death in 2008. Several years later, a new Ocean's Eleven spin-off with an all-female cast led by Sandra Bullock as the sister of George Clooney's Danny Ocean was put in development, conceived by producer Jerry Weintraub, Soderbergh and Clooney. Olivia Milch wrote the screenplay, and Gary Ross directed the film. Helena Bonham Carter, Cate Blanchett, Mindy Kaling, Anne Hathaway, Rihanna, Nora "Awkwafina" Lum and Sarah Paulson star in the film. The film was released in the United States on June 8, 2018.

=== Future ===
==== Untitled prequel film ====
In May 2022, a prequel film set in 1960s Europe, reportedly titled Oceans (plural, not possessive), was revealed to be in development, which will also connect to and incorporate elements from the original film, and is intended to not be a reboot, but instead set within the established continuity. Margot Robbie will star in and produce the project, while Jay Roach will direct with Carrie Solomon set to write the script. Roach and Tom Ackerley will additionally serve as producers alongside Robbie. The project will be a joint-venture production between Warner Bros. Pictures, LuckyChap Entertainment, and Village Roadshow Pictures. Shortly after its initial announcement, Ryan Gosling entered early negotiations in August to co-star in the film, alongside Robbie. In December 2023, it was revealed that the characters that Robbie and Gosling would be playing are the parents of Danny and Debbie Ocean (as portrayed by Clooney and Bullock, respectively). The film's tentative production start date was for spring 2023, but was ultimately delayed due to the cast's production schedule.

In July 2025, it was reported that Lee Isaac Chung was in talks to direct the film. In October 2025, it was reported that Bradley Cooper was in talks to play the male lead, replacing Gosling. Chung was also confirmed to have officially signed on to direct. In March 2026, Chung left the film due to creative differences. The same month it was reported that Bradley Cooper was in talks to write and direct following Chung's departure. At CinemaCon in April, the plot was revealed to be focusing on Danny Ocean's parents as they attempt to pull off a heist at the 1962 Monaco Grand Prix and that the film would be released on June 25, 2027.

==== Ocean's Fourteen ====
A sequel to Ocean's Thirteen had been in development until Bernie Mac's death in 2008. In June 2021, Don Cheadle revealed that Steven Soderbergh had been working on the concept of a sequel film. The following month, Matt Damon also expressed interest in returning to the franchise, while stating that the project was up to Soderbergh. In December 2023, George Clooney revealed that the script for the film was completed and confirmed his involvement. He said that the story was comparable to Going in Style. In September 2024, it was announced that Edward Berger was in early negotiations to direct the film, with Clooney and Brad Pitt reprising their roles from previous movies. Various recurring characters are expected to also return, while the movie will be a joint-venture production between Warner Bros. Pictures, and Smokehouse Pictures. While Clooney and Pitt have confirmed that there is a script made, and both liked it, it was confirmed that there was no such discussion with Berger specifically. In January 2025, it was reported that David Leitch was in talks to direct Ocean's Fourteen, with Damon and Casey Affleck set to return; Leitch and Pitt previously worked together on Bullet Train (2022). In October 2025, George Clooney revealed that the budget was finalized by Warner Bros, and it would start shooting next year, with Roberts and Cheadle also expected to return, among others.

==== Potential crossover ====
In April 2023, Steven Soderbergh and George Clooney said during the Toronto International Film Festival that they had discussed a crossover sequel with the Magic Mike saga.

Film	U.S. release date	Director	Screenwriter(s)	Story by	Producer(s)	Status
Ocean's 11	August 10, 1960	Lewis Milestone	Harry Brown & Charles Lederer	Jack Golden Russell & George Clayton Johnson	Lewis Milestone	Released
Ocean's Eleven	December 7, 2001	Steven Soderbergh	Ted Griffin	Ted Griffin	Jerry Weintraub	Released
Ocean's Twelve	December 10, 2004	Steven Soderbergh	George Nolfi	George Nolfi	Jerry Weintraub	Released
Ocean's Thirteen	June 8, 2007	Steven Soderbergh	David Levien & Brian Koppelman	David Levien & Brian Koppelman	Jerry Weintraub	Released
Ocean's 8	June 8, 2018	Gary Ross	Gary Ross & Olivia Milch	Gary Ross	Susan Ekins & Steven Soderbergh	Released
Untitled prequel	June 25, 2027	Bradley Cooper	Bradley Cooper	Bradley Cooper	Jay Roach, Tom Ackerley & Margot Robbie	Filming
Ocean's Fourteen	TBA	David Leitch	TBA	TBA	TBA	Pre-production

== Principal cast and characters ==
List indicators

This section includes characters who will appear or have appeared in the series.

- An empty grey cell indicates the character was not in the film, or that the character's official presence has not yet been confirmed.
- ^{E} indicates an appearance not included in the theatrical cut.
- ^{P} indicates an appearance in onscreen photographs.

Character	Original	Remake series			Spin-off	Prequel
Character	Ocean's 11	Ocean's Eleven	Ocean's Twelve	Ocean's Thirteen	Ocean's 8	Untitled prequel film
Character	1960	2001	2004	2007	2018	2027
Danny Ocean	Frank Sinatra	George Clooney	George Clooney	George Clooney	George Clooney^{P}	
Sam Harmon	Dean Martin					
Josh Howard	Sammy Davis Jr.					
Jimmy Foster	Peter Lawford					
Beatrice Ocean	Angie Dickinson					
Tony Bergdorf	Richard Conte					
Duke Santos	Cesar Romero					
Adele Elkstrom	Patrice Wymore					
"Mushy" O'Connors	Joey Bishop					
Roger Corneal	Henry Silva					
Vince Massler	Buddy Lester					
George "Curly" Steffans	Richard Benedict					
Peter Rheimer	Norman Fell					
Louis Jackson	Clem Harvey					
Spyros Acebos	Akim Tamiroff					
Rusty Ryan		Brad Pitt	Brad Pitt	Brad Pitt		
Linus Caldwell		Matt Damon	Matt Damon	Matt Damon	Matt Damon^{E}	
Terry Benedict		Andy García	Andy García	Andy García		
Tess Ocean		Julia Roberts	Julia Roberts	Mentioned		
Basher Tarr		Don Cheadle	Don Cheadle	Don Cheadle		
Frank Catton		Bernie Mac	Bernie Mac	Bernie Mac		
Reuben Tishkoff		Elliott Gould	Elliott Gould	Elliott Gould	Elliott Gould	
Saul Bloom		Carl Reiner	Carl Reiner	Carl Reiner	Carl Reiner^{E}	
Virgil Malloy		Casey Affleck	Casey Affleck	Casey Affleck		
Turk Malloy		Scott Caan	Scott Caan	Scott Caan		
Livingston Dell		Eddie Jemison	Eddie Jemison	Eddie Jemison		
"The Amazing" Yen		Shaobo Qin	Shaobo Qin	Shaobo Qin	Shaobo Qin	
Walsh		Michael DeLano	Michael DeLano			
Bruiser		Scott L. Schwartz	Scott L. Schwartz	Scott L. Schwartz		
Denny Shields		Jerry Weintraub	Jerry Weintraub	Jerry Weintraub		
Isabel Lahiri		Mentioned	Catherine Zeta-Jones	Mentioned		
François Toulour The Night Fox			Vincent Cassel	Vincent Cassel		
Roman Nagel			Eddie Izzard	Eddie Izzard		
Matsui			Robbie Coltrane			
Molly Stark			Cherry Jones			
Gaspar LeMarc			Albert Finney			
Commissario Giordano			Mattia Sbragia			
Abigail Sponder			Ellen Barkin^{E} (Note: Barkin appears in the deleted scene named, "Meet the Team, Again")	Ellen Barkin		
Willy Bank				Al Pacino		
"The V.U.P."				David Paymer		
Bobby Caldwell		Mentioned	Peter Fonda^{E} (Note: Although it was reported that Peter Fonda had joined Ocean's Twelve as Matt Damon's character's father, his scenes were not included in the final cut of the film. The character was recast in Ocean's Thirteen.)	Bob Einstein		
Debbie				Olga Sosnovska		
Deborah "Debbie" Ocean					Sandra Bullock	
Lou Miller					Cate Blanchett	
Daphne Kluger					Anne Hathaway	
Leslie "Nine Ball" Jordan					Rihanna	
Rose Weil					Helena Bonham Carter	
Amita					Mindy Kaling	
Tammy					Sarah Paulson	
Constance					Awkwafina	
Claude Becker					Richard Armitage	
John Frazier					James Corden	
Penelope Stern					Dakota Fanning	
Veronica Jordan					Nathanya Alexander	
Mrs. Ocean		Mentioned			Mentioned	Margot Robbie
Mr. Ocean		Mentioned			Mentioned	Bradley Cooper
TBA						Wagner Moura
TBA						Monica Barbaro
TBA						Josh Gad
TBA						Vicky Krieps
TBA						George MacKay
TBA						Omar Sy
TBA						Lauren Ridloff
TBA						Jack Holden

== Additional crew and production details ==
Film	Crew/Detail					
Film	Composer	Cinematographer	Editor	Production companies	Distributing company	Running time
Ocean's 11	Nelson Riddle	William H. Daniels	Philip W. Anderson	Warner Bros. Pictures; Dorchester Productions	Warner Bros. Pictures	127 mins
Ocean's Eleven	David Holmes	Peter Andrews	Stephen Mirrione	NPV Entertainment; Warner Bros. Pictures; Section Eight Productions; Village Roadshow Pictures; Jerry Weintraub Productions	Warner Bros. Pictures	116 mins
Ocean's Twelve	David Holmes	Peter Andrews	Stephen Mirrione	Warner Bros. Pictures; Section Eight Productions; Village Roadshow Pictures; Jerry Weintraub Productions	Warner Bros. Pictures	125 mins
Ocean's Thirteen	David Holmes	Peter Andrews	Stephen Mirrione	Warner Bros. Pictures; Section Eight Productions; Village Roadshow Pictures; Jerry Weintraub Productions	Warner Bros. Pictures	122 mins
Ocean's 8	Daniel Pemberton	Eigil Bryld	Juliette Welfling	Smokehouse Pictures; Warner Bros. Pictures; Village Roadshow Pictures; Larger Than Life Productions	Warner Bros. Pictures	110 mins

== Reception ==
=== Box office performance ===
Film	Box office revenue			Box office ranking		Budget	Reference
Film	United States	International	Worldwide	All time domestic	All time worldwide	Budget	Reference
Ocean's Eleven	$183,417,150	$267,300,000	$450,717,150	#241	#286	$85 million	
Ocean's Twelve	$125,544,280	$237,200,000	$362,744,280	#504	#344	$110 million	
Ocean's Thirteen	$117,154,724	$194,157,900	$311,312,624	#567	#441	$85 million	
Ocean's 8	$140,218,711	$157,500,000	$297,718,711	#406	#474	$70 million	
Total	$566,334,865	$856,157,900	$1,422,492,765	–	–	$350 million	

=== Critical response ===
Critical and public response of Ocean's films
Title	Critical		Public
Title	Rotten Tomatoes	Metacritic	CinemaScore
Ocean's Eleven	83% (188 reviews)	74 (35 reviews)	B+
Ocean's Twelve	55% (188 reviews)	58 (39 reviews)	B−
Ocean's Thirteen	70% (201 reviews)	62 (37 reviews)	B+
Ocean's 8	69% (360 reviews)	61 (50 reviews)	B+

== See also ==
- List of films set in Las Vegas
