= 2002 MTV Movie Awards =

American awards show

- Date: Saturday, June 1, 2002
- Location: Shrine Auditorium, Los Angeles, California
- Country: United States
- Hosted by: Jack Black; Sarah Michelle Gellar

Television/radio coverage
- Network: MTV

The 2002 MTV Movie Awards aired on MTV on Saturday, June 1, 2002 from the Shrine Auditorium in Los Angeles, California, hosted by Jack Black and Sarah Michelle Gellar, and featured performances by The White Stripes, Kelly Osbourne and Eminem. It was the 11th Annual MTV Movie Awards. This year, MTV added four new award categories, but their winners didn't appear in the TV Show: "Favorite Line", "Best Cameo", "Best Dressed" and "Best Music Moment". The "Best Song" (or "Best Musical Performance") category disappeared, and the "Best Dance Sequence" category returned. "Best On-Screen Duo" became "Best On-Screen Team".

== Performers ==
- Jack Black & Sarah Michelle Gellar – "Movies Kick Ass"
- The White Stripes – "Fell in Love with a Girl" / "Dead Leaves and the Dirty Ground"
- Eminem (featuring Proof and Ryan Shepard) – "Without Me"
- Kelly Osbourne – "Papa Don't Preach"

== Presenters ==
- Jennifer Garner and Charlize Theron — presented Best Male Performance
- Linda Cardellini, Matthew Lillard, and Freddie Prinze, Jr. — presented Best Kiss
- Kate Beckinsale and Nicolas Cage — presented Best Action Sequence
- Vin Diesel and Eve — presented Breakthrough Female
- Jack Black — introduced The White Stripes
- Bow Wow and Katie Holmes — presented Best Villain
- Johnny Knoxville and Will Smith — presented Best Musical Sequence
- Chris Rock — introduced Eminem
- Matt Damon and Franka Potente — presented Best Fight
- Hilary Swank — presented Best New Filmmaker
- Brittany Murphy and Eddie Griffin — presented Breakthrough Male
- Ben Affleck and Bridget Moynahan — presented Best Comedic Performance
- Ozzy Osbourne — introduced Kelly Osbourne
- Adam Sandler and Winona Ryder — presented Best On-Screen Team
- Natalie Portman and Ewan McGregor — presented Best Female Performance
- Mike Myers — presented Best Movie

== Awards ==
Below are the list of nominations. Winners are listed at the top of each list in bold.

=== Best Movie ===
The Lord of the Rings: The Fellowship of the Ring

- Black Hawk Down
- The Fast and the Furious
- Legally Blonde
- Shrek

=== Best Male Performance ===
Will Smith – Ali

- Russell Crowe – A Beautiful Mind
- Vin Diesel – The Fast and the Furious
- Josh Hartnett – Pearl Harbor
- Elijah Wood – The Lord of the Rings: The Fellowship of the Ring

=== Best Female Performance ===
Nicole Kidman – Moulin Rouge!

- Kate Beckinsale – Pearl Harbor
- Halle Berry – Monster's Ball
- Angelina Jolie – Lara Croft: Tomb Raider
- Reese Witherspoon – Legally Blonde

=== Breakthrough Male ===
Orlando Bloom – The Lord of the Rings: The Fellowship of the Ring

- DMX – Exit Wounds
- Colin Hanks – Orange County
- Daniel Radcliffe – Harry Potter and the Sorcerer's Stone
- Paul Walker – The Fast and the Furious

=== Breakthrough Female ===
Mandy Moore – A Walk to Remember

- Penélope Cruz – Blow
- Anne Hathaway – The Princess Diaries
- Shannyn Sossamon – A Knight's Tale
- Britney Spears – Crossroads

=== Best On-Screen Team ===
Vin Diesel and Paul Walker – The Fast and the Furious

- Casey Affleck, Scott Caan, Don Cheadle, George Clooney, Matt Damon, Elliott Gould, Eddie Jemison, Bernie Mac, Brad Pitt, Shaobo Qin and Carl Reiner – Ocean's Eleven
- Jackie Chan and Chris Tucker – Rush Hour 2
- Cameron Diaz, Eddie Murphy and Mike Myers – Shrek
- Ben Stiller and Owen Wilson – Zoolander

=== Best Villain ===
Denzel Washington – Training Day

- Aaliyah – Queen of the Damned
- Christopher Lee – The Lord of the Rings: The Fellowship of the Ring
- Tim Roth – Planet of the Apes
- Zhang Ziyi – Rush Hour 2

=== Best Comedic Performance ===
Reese Witherspoon – Legally Blonde

- Eddie Murphy – Shrek
- Mike Myers – Shrek
- Seann William Scott – American Pie 2
- Chris Tucker – Rush Hour 2

=== Best Kiss ===
Jason Biggs and Seann William Scott – American Pie 2

- Nicole Kidman and Ewan McGregor – Moulin Rouge!
- Mia Kirshner and Beverly Polcyn – Not Another Teen Movie
- Heath Ledger and Shannyn Sossamon – A Knight's Tale
- Renée Zellweger and Colin Firth – Bridget Jones's Diary

=== Best Action Sequence ===
The Attack Scene – Pearl Harbor

- First Helicopter Crash – Black Hawk Down
- The Final Race – The Fast and the Furious
- The Cave Tomb Battle – The Lord of the Rings: The Fellowship of the Ring

=== Best Musical Sequence ===
Nicole Kidman and Ewan McGregor — "Elephant Love Medley" (from Moulin Rouge!)

- Heath Ledger and Shannyn Sossamon — "Golden Years" (from A Knight's Tale)
- Chris Tucker — "Don't Stop 'Til You Get Enough" (from Rush Hour 2)
- Nicole Kidman — "Sparkling Diamonds" (from Moulin Rouge!)

=== Best Fight ===
Jackie Chan and Chris Tucker vs. Hong Kong Gang – Rush Hour 2

- Angelina Jolie vs. Robot – Lara Croft: Tomb Raider
- Christopher Lee vs. Ian McKellen – The Lord of the Rings: The Fellowship of the Ring
- Jet Li vs. Himself – The One

=== Best Line ===
"Oh, I Like your Outfit Too, Except When I Dress Up As a Frigid Bitch, I Try Not to Look so Constipated" — Reese Witherspoon (from Legally Blonde)

- "King Kong ain't got nothin' on me!" — Denzel Washington (from Training Day)
- "Oh, It's Already Been Brought!" — Jaime Pressly (from Not Another Teen Movie)
- "There's More to Life than Just Being Really, Really, Really Ridicuously Good Looking" — Ben Stiller (from Zoolander)
- "We Graduated High School. How Totally Amazing" — Thora Birch (from Ghost World)
- "Yeah, I Kind of Super Glued Myself, to, uh, Myself" — Jason Biggs (from American Pie 2)

=== Best Cameo ===
Snoop Dogg – Training Day

- Charlton Heston – Planet of the Apes
- David Bowie – Zoolander
- Dustin Diamond – Made
- Kylie Minogue – Moulin Rouge!
- Molly Ringwald – Not Another Teen Movie

=== Best Dressed ===
Reese Witherspoon – Legally Blonde

- Britney Spears – Crossroads
- Thora Birch – Ghost World
- George Clooney – Ocean's Eleven
- Will Ferrell – Zoolander
- Ben Stiller – Zoolander

=== Best New Filmmaker ===
- **Christopher Nolan – Memento**
