= List of Ocean's characters =

Listing of characters in the Ocean's film series

The following is a list of characters from the Ocean's film series. It includes characters from both Steven Soderbergh's Ocean's trilogy, including 2001's Ocean's Eleven, 2004's Ocean's Twelve and 2007's Ocean's Thirteen, and 2018's spin-off, Ocean's 8.

== Cast and characters ==
List indicators

This section includes characters who will appear or have appeared in the series.

- An empty grey cell indicates the character was not in the film, or that the character's official presence has not yet been confirmed.
- ^{E} indicates an appearance not included in the theatrical cut.
- ^{P} indicates an appearance in onscreen photographs.

Character	Original film	Remake films			Spin-off	Prequel
Character	Ocean's 11	Ocean's Eleven	Ocean's Twelve	Ocean's Thirteen	Ocean's 8	Untitled prequel film
Character	1960	2001	2004	2007	2018	TBA
Danny Ocean	Frank Sinatra	George Clooney	George Clooney	George Clooney	George Clooney^{P}	
Sam Harmon	Dean Martin					
Josh Howard	Sammy Davis Jr.					
Jimmy Foster	Peter Lawford					
Beatrice Ocean	Angie Dickinson					
Tony Bergdorf	Richard Conte					
Duke Santos	Cesar Romero					
Adele Elkstrom	Patrice Wymore					
"Mushy" O'Connors	Joey Bishop					
Roger Corneal	Henry Silva					
Vince Massler	Buddy Lester					
George "Curly" Steffans	Richard Benedict					
Peter Rheimer	Norman Fell					
Louis Jackson	Clem Harvey					
Spyros Acebos	Akim Tamiroff					
Rusty Ryan		Brad Pitt	Brad Pitt	Brad Pitt		
Linus Caldwell		Matt Damon	Matt Damon	Matt Damon	Matt Damon^{E}	
Terry Benedict		Andy García	Andy García	Andy García		
Tess Ocean		Julia Roberts	Julia Roberts			
Basher Tarr		Don Cheadle	Don Cheadle	Don Cheadle		
Virgil Malloy		Casey Affleck	Casey Affleck	Casey Affleck		
Turk Malloy		Scott Caan	Scott Caan	Scott Caan		
Reuben Tishkoff		Elliott Gould	Elliott Gould	Elliott Gould	Elliott Gould	
Frank Catton		Bernie Mac	Bernie Mac	Bernie Mac		
Livingston Dell		Eddie Jemison	Eddie Jemison	Eddie Jemison		
Saul Bloom		Carl Reiner	Carl Reiner	Carl Reiner	Carl Reiner^{E}	
"The Amazing" Yen		Shaobo Qin	Shaobo Qin	Shaobo Qin	Shaobo Qin	
Walsh		Michael DeLano	Michael DeLano			
Bruiser		Scott L. Schwartz	Scott L. Schwartz	Scott L. Schwartz		
Denny Shields		Jerry Weintraub	Jerry Weintraub	Jerry Weintraub		
François Toulour The Night Fox			Vincent Cassel	Vincent Cassel		
Isabel Lahiri		Mentioned	Catherine Zeta-Jones			
Matsui			Robbie Coltrane			
Molly Stark			Cherry Jones			
Gaspar LeMarc			Albert Finney			
Commissario Giordano			Mattia Sbragia			
Roman Nagel			Eddie Izzard	Eddie Izzard		
Abigail Sponder			Ellen Barkin^{E} (Note: Barkin appears in the deleted scene named, "Meet the Team, Again")	Ellen Barkin		
Bobby Caldwell			Peter Fonda^{E} (Note: Although it was reported that Peter Fonda had joined Ocean's Twelve as Matt Damon's character's father, his scenes were not included in the final cut of the film. The character was recast in Ocean's Thirteen.)	Bob Einstein		
Willy Bank				Al Pacino		
Debbie				Olga Sosnovska		
"The V.U.P."				David Paymer		
Deborah "Debbie" Ocean					Sandra Bullock	
Lou Miller					Cate Blanchett	
Rose Weil					Helena Bonham Carter	
Daphne Kluger					Anne Hathaway	
Leslie "Nine Ball" Jordan					Rihanna	
Amita					Mindy Kaling	
Constance					Awkwafina	
Tammy					Sarah Paulson	
Claude Becker					Richard Armitage	
John Frazier					James Corden	
Penelope Stern					Dakota Fanning	
Veronica Jordan					Nathanya Alexander	
Mrs. Ocean						Margot Robbie
Mr. Ocean						Bradley Cooper

== The Eleven ==
=== Danny Ocean ===
Danny Ocean (George Clooney) is a fictional thief from New York City, ringleader and idea man for the main crew that robs three casinos in Ocean’s Eleven, a Fabergé egg in Ocean’s Twelve, and diamonds in Ocean’s Thirteen. He is motivated to pull the Bellagio job in the first film as revenge for Terry Benedict dating his ex-wife, Tess. His success in this job and the notoriety it brings him is what incites the jealousy of Toulour and sets off the events of the second film. In the third film, he undertakes the con against Willy Bank to get revenge for Reuben. He is presumed to be dead by the events of Ocean's 8, though his sister Debbie has expressed her doubts about his demise, hinting the possibility that he has merely faked his death and gone underground.

=== Rusty Ryan ===
Robert Charles "Rusty” Ryan (Brad Pitt) is Danny Ocean's right-hand man. Rusty's skills are used more in the planning phase of the heists. Rusty's ex-girlfriend Isabel is what gets the team in trouble in Ocean's Twelve, despite condemning Danny's efforts to win back an ex-wife in Ocean's Eleven. Rusty has a weakness for his hotel, which puts him in debt by Ocean's Twelve and has led him to constantly pull off jobs to keep his hotel financially stable by Ocean's Thirteen.

=== Linus Caldwell ===
The son of a legendary con artist, Bobby Caldwell, Linus (Matt Damon) is one of two newcomers to Danny's crew, recruited by Danny in person. Having witnessed Linus's pickpocket skills grifting in Chicago, he offers him a key slot on his crew for one of the essential parts of the elaborate heist. Throughout the trilogy, Linus repeatedly attempts to live up to this family's reputation and gain respect within the crew. At various times, he seems to succeed: he backs up Danny in Ocean's Eleven by bringing extra batteries for the remote explosive detonator, which turns out to be crucial, and in Ocean's Twelve gets a chance to run the con when half the crew ends up in prison. In Ocean's Thirteen, Linus offers to seduce a casino staff member despite the team's doubts about his ability. He is eventually successful in his endeavor. Eager to prove himself, he frequently offers to tackle challenging parts of the con and assert himself as a leader within the team.

=== Reuben Tishkoff ===
A flamboyant business kingpin, Reuben (Elliott Gould) is an old-school business tycoon who gets muscled out of his Vegas hotel by Terry Benedict, leading him to finance the expensive casino caper. He appears to be pushed over again in Ocean's Thirteen, when he is forced out of a partnership by Willy Bank, leading to a breakdown that ignites Ocean's revenge plot against Bank. His cunning business instinct is illustrated by the fact that he was the only one to make money out of his take in the Bellagio heist (on the stock market) rather than lose money through spending over the last three years. He appears in Ocean's 8 to pass on a message from the apparently-deceased Danny to his sister Debbie.

=== Saul Bloom ===
Saul Bloom (Carl Reiner) is an ulcerous old pro con-man who is brought out of retirement to play a crucial role in the casino-heist, playing “Lyman Zerga”, an arms dealer with a special delivery he needs to be located in the casino-vault. His presence ensures that a member of the team is watching the security cameras and getting the explosives into the vault. In Twelve, Saul initially refuses to go along with the pan-European caper but ultimately shows up as a Swiss doctor in the Lookie-loo con. In Thirteen, Saul plays “Kensington Chubb”, a British hotel reviewer.

=== Basher Tarr ===
Basher Tarr (Don Cheadle) is the munitions expert of the team. Talking with a heavy cockney accent, often in rhyming slang, Basher is more in it for the thrills than for the money, even calling Rusty and Danny "proper villains" as opposed to the fools with whom he unsuccessfully tries to rob a bank in Eleven. He is brought in to create the power blackout necessary for Danny and Linus to get down the elevator shaft in Eleven, and simulates an earthquake with a drilling machine in Thirteen.

=== Frank Catton ===
An old acquaintance of Danny and Rusty, Frank Catton (Bernie Mac) is an experienced card dealer who has left his mark in various Vegas casinos. He is the first to be recruited for the Bellagio-plan. He is shown to have an affinity for manicures, which even leads to his arrest in Twelve. His lack of participation in Twelve is made up for by his central role in the two casino-heists: first as the inside man at the Bellagio, later as a game host in Bank's casino. The simulated quarrel with Linus's NGC-persona results in the latter pickpocketing the vault codes out of Benedict's jacket.

=== Livingston Dell ===
Livingston Dell (Eddie Jemison) is the tech-guy, a surveillance specialist who moonlights for the FBI. While a genius with computers, and surveillance equipment, Livingston's anxiety threatens the success of the Bellagio heist. Despite his nervousness, he passes a polygraph test in Thirteen, although he fails to rig the card shuffling machines and secretly calls Roman Nagel for help.

=== The Malloy Brothers ===
Living in Provo, Utah, "the Mormon twins" Virgil and Turk Malloy are fraternal twin brothers brought in by Rusty to aid in the scheme in Eleven. Recruited as "drivers" in the first movie, both are used in many other parts of the schemes. They are shown to be talented mechanics as well as adept at disguises for many situations. Despite their relationship being an antagonistic one of constant arguing they are useful together and the arguing often helps when in disguise or creating distractions. Their knowledge of remote-controlled cars is used in Eleven. During Thirteen they each ended up disrupting the plan to rig the dice for The Bank at the manufacturers' by staging a strike for better working conditions, with Virgil starting the strike and Turk continuing it despite going there to get his brother back on track. In all three films, the brothers conduct surveillance while undercover.

Virgil and Turk are portrayed by Casey Affleck and Scott Caan, respectively.

=== The Amazing Yen ===
The Chinese acrobat Yen is the second of two newbies in the group, called a “grease man” by Danny and Rusty, brought in for his flexibility and short stature. He is the first to actually enter the heavily guarded and secured casino-vault, brought into the underground backstage tunnels while confined in a money-cart cunningly delivered by the Malloy brothers, while being watched by Saul's Lyman Zerga character. Once inside, Yen places the explosives from Zerga's briefcase on the vault door, waiting for Danny and Linus to trigger it from the outside. His newfound wealth after the heist results in him inhabiting a huge Florida mansion, dressing up with a lot of bling. His specific skills are much less necessary in the subsequent heists, though in Thirteen he is responsible for climbing up an elevator shaft. He assists Debbie Ocean and Lou in stealing the Crown Jewels from the Met Gala in Ocean's 8, Lou smuggling him in under a food tray during a distraction caused by the theft of the main necklace and Debbie distracting the guards outside the jewel room while Yen and Lou switched the real diamonds for the fakes.

Yen, played by real life acrobat Qin Shaobo, only generally speaks in Mandarin, which almost everyone in the gang can understand, and can understand English. His only lines in the movies that are English are filled with curse words, such as in Eleven when he shouts to Danny and Linus "Where the fuck you been?", and in Thirteen, where the only word he says in English, repeated several times, is "Shit."

== Antagonists ==
=== Terry Benedict ===
Benedict is the slick owner of three Las Vegas casinos (Bellagio, MGM Grand Las Vegas and The Mirage). Having a romantic relationship with Tess Ocean makes him the perfect target for Danny's big plan. After the major heist, he vows to get those responsible. It is not until he gets help from the mysterious “Night Fox” that he actually does, and reluctantly offers them two weeks to cough up all the money they owe him (plus interest) before killing them. While still an antagonist of the team, he is recruited in Thirteen (and therefore possibly the twelfth member of the crew in this particular scheme) after Danny's crew runs out of money halfway through the Bank-con. Out of hatred for Willy Bank, Benedict agrees to back the operation financially, with his own demands – yet sets up the Night Fox to double cross the team. Terry's ruthlessness, exemplified most by his choice for his lost vault money over Tess, is ironically opposed by his forced performance as a philanthropist on The Oprah Winfrey Show. Benedict was the first target for Ocean's Eleven.

Benedict is played by Andy García.

=== François Toulour ===
Best known alias, “Night Fox”, Toulour is a Baron and master thief, whose skills are rivaled only by Danny Ocean. He is LeMarc's protégé, mentioned by Europol as the only one worthy to be mentioned in the same breath as LeMarc. His ego triggers him to force Ocean's crew into a competition. He sets the team up by telling Terry Benedict of their whereabouts, and challenges the team to determine who is the best thief, promising to pay off their debt to Benedict if he loses. While he manages to steal the target, a Fabergé egg, he later learns the egg he stole was fake and the team beat him to it. Toulour is humiliated, but pays off Benedict. He reappears in Benedict's service, attempting to foil Danny's heist of the diamond awards in The Bank Hotel. The opposite of Ocean, Toulour specializes as a cat burglar; as such, his jobs are more physically demanding and seemingly carried out by him alone, whereas Ocean prefers using the 'Long Con' approach to slowly manipulate the situation to his favor. Toulour becomes the second target for Ocean's Twelve.

Toulour is played by Vincent Cassel.

=== Willy Bank ===
Bank is a successful and experienced hotel owner, with every hotel under his ownership having won a prestigious award. He serves as the main antagonist of the third film. He thinks of himself as a credible old-timer, for he once shook Sinatra's hand. After backstabbing Reuben, his soon-to-be-opened hotel-casino becomes the final target for Ocean's Thirteen.

Bank is played by Al Pacino.

== The Women ==
=== Tess Ocean ===
Having filed for divorce during her husband's four-year prison term, Tess moves away from New York and becomes the curator of the Bellagio art gallery. She also begins a relationship with Terry Benedict, resulting in the jealousy of her ex-husband Danny. Unknowingly, she plays a small part in the casino heist when a cell phone is put in her coat. After realizing Danny loves her more than Terry, she goes back to him and awaits him coming out of his second prison sentence (for violating his parole). In Twelve, although Tess seems to accept her husband's never-ending search for potential targets, she still demands that her husband take their lives more seriously. However, she is drawn into the planned theft by invitation of Linus, who needs her in the museum heist as she bears a striking resemblance to actress Julia Roberts. After she and Danny are reunited she makes him apologize for forcing her into doing something wrong.

Tess is played by Julia Roberts and is generally considered to be Ocean's twelfth member in the second film.

=== Isabel Lahiri ===
Only mentioned in Eleven as Rusty's ex-girlfriend, Isabel appears in Twelve as an agent for Europol living in Amsterdam specializing in major robberies, on the hunt for the Night Fox while admirably commemorating the all time master thief Gaspar LeMarc. Her expertise, it appears, comes from her estranged father, who was, in fact, LeMarc himself, a negative legacy Isabel seems to want to break away from. However, she loves Rusty too much to give him up – until he runs off. At their next meeting, with Rusty in Amsterdam doing a job with the Ocean crew, she is much less forgiving, and eventually chases the men all the way to Rome.

Isabel is played by Catherine Zeta-Jones. Isabel and Tess do not appear in Thirteen, as Danny states it is “not their fight” (referring to the revenge on Willy Bank).

=== Abigail Sponder ===
Miss Sponder is Willy Bank's right-hand-woman, appearing to be cold and strict, only to be seduced by Linus (in disguise) wearing a chemical substance. She deeply appreciates Bank on a platonic level, although the sentiments are not reciprocated.

Abigail is played by Ellen Barkin.

== Aides ==
The following helpers of the Ocean's crew generally do not know the entire master plan of each film's con, or do not share in the final loot (or so it is implied). Nevertheless, many of them could take claim to being a member of Ocean's evergrowing team, going as far as sixteen known associates in Ocean's Thirteen, rather than the 13 the title implies.

=== Bruiser ===
Next to Ocean's original eleven, Denny Shields and Terry Benedict, Bruiser is the only character to appear in all three films, each time as a small aide in the plan, presumably without knowing the magnitude of the overall scheme. In Eleven, he is paid $2 million by Danny to fake beating him up. In Twelve, he appears in Amsterdam as a lawyer getting Frank Catton out of jail. In Thirteen, he plays a high roller.

Bruiser is played by Scott L. Schwartz.

=== Roman Nagel ===
Roman Nagel is a British master thief whom Rusty and Frank had worked with in the past. A technological genius, he makes the holographic Fabergé egg in Twelve, and comes back in Thirteen for advice on nearly all the cons planned for the reversed big score. Nagel provides key information about the Greco security system that leads to the use of a magnetron to disable the system, and an earthquake to provide an exit plan. Further, after Livingston is "caught", he swaps out all of the shuffling machines, allowing them to run the blackjack cheat.

Nagel is played by Eddie Izzard.

=== Matsui ===
When Rusty tricks the gang into going to Amsterdam for a job, Danny, Rusty and Linus meet up with Matsui to hear the details – hoping for a better paying job once the first one is executed. Matsui, however, was recruited by Toulour to send the Ocean-team on a heist the Night Fox performs himself. The meeting with Matsui, taking place in coffee shop De Dampkring, is composed of seemingly senseless phrases – or so it appears. It is later revealed the sign language is a practical joke ("Lost in Translation") pulled on Linus as a reminder for him not to be too eager on the team's leadership.

Matsui is played by Robbie Coltrane.

=== Molly Starr ===
When the Ocean-crew is in jail in Italy after the failed theft of the Coronation egg in Twelve, the local justiciary hands them over to an American official demanding their extradition. It is revealed after the prison scene that Molly is in fact Linus’ mother.

Molly Starr is played by Cherry Jones.

=== Gaspar LeMarc ===
The mysterious all time master thief mentioned by Isabel as an example for all active robbers, LeMarc actually plays a crucial part in the entire operation carried out by Ocean's eleven in Twelve. He pits the Night Fox against the Ocean crew with his master plan, which results in him getting back the Coronation Egg he once stole but gave back because his wife insisted on it; the Ocean crew getting their money from the Night Fox needed to pay back Benedict; and LeMarc getting reacquainted with his estranged daughter.

LeMarc is played by Albert Finney.

=== Debbie ===
She is a concierge at The Bank in Thirteen, and after being promised a managing function in a hotel in Macau, agrees to help the crew in a variety of small ways in their elaborate con, thus functioning as an inside-(wo)man.

Debbie is played by Olga Sosnovska.

=== Bobby Caldwell ===
Mentioned in the first two films as a legendary con artist and personal friend of the likes of Reuben and Danny, Bobby Caldwell is Linus's father. It is revealed in Thirteen that he works as an FBI-agent specializing in casino fraud cases. This provides what his son Linus calls "the greatest cover of all time." He uses this cover to assist the team in placing rigged gaming equipment in the Bank Casino and assist his son to steal the "Five Diamond" necklaces.

Caldwell is played by Bob Einstein.

=== Charmaine ===
An exotic dancer who is attending medical school. Rusty, who has a past acquaintance with Charmaine's mother and coworker, hires Charmaine to pickpocket a casino employee's security badge in Eleven.

Charmaine (credited as "Dancer") is played by Kelly Adkins

=== Neil ===
A pit boss at the Bank in Thirteen who is blackmailed and bribed into helping the team rig the roulette wheel against the house after being caught pawning casino silverware.

Neil is played by Don McManus

== Others ==
=== Topher Grace ===
The film actor is one of several TV-stars making a cameo appearance in Eleven as poker-students being taught the game by Rusty, but makes another small appearance as himself in Twelve as a visitor of Rusty's ill-fated west coast hotel, having trashed his room and appearing under the influence of drugs or alcohol, stating he “totally phoned in that Dennis Quaid-movie” (a reference to In Good Company, the trailer of which was shown before Ocean's Twelve). Grace planned to make a cameo in Thirteen, where he would have run into Rusty outside the casino and engaged in conversation while holding an Asian baby – the gag being there was no explanation as to where the baby came from. Grace's schedule on reshoots for Spider-Man 3 ultimately prevented this scene from ever being filmed.

=== Walsh ===
Casino-manager in Benedict's casino, who stays with Lyman Zerga during his heart attack.

Played by Michael Delano in Eleven and Twelve.

=== Commissario Giordano ===
He refuses Isabel the necessary arrest papers for the Ocean's crew, after which she forges them. This will prove useful later on, when Giordano denies Lahiri any rights to interrogate the thieves, rather turning them over to a US official.

Played by Mattia Sbragia in Twelve.

=== Bruce Willis ===
Plays himself visiting Rome, and running into Tess-as-Julia Roberts. After many characters comment to Willis they foresaw the surprise twist of his most successful movie, Willis himself claims to have known the museum con (the “Lookie-loo with a Bundle of Joy”) all along.

=== Denny Shields ===
Played by Jerry Weintraub, the producer of the trilogy. He merely makes a cameo as a high roller in Eleven, but this was turned into a more significant role in the sequels. In Twelve, in flashback, we see him (still unnamed) bragging to LeMarc about Danny's Bellagio-heist, calling him the best thief he has ever seen. In hindsight, this remark may be the kick start of all events in the second movie, as François Toulour is witness to the remark, and because of his jealousy begins to stage the complex “steal-off” with Danny, involving Terry Benedict along the way. In Thirteen, Weintraub returns as this character, this time called Shields, being more involved in Ocean's heist on Willy Bank, partially out of guilt for getting Ocean's group in trouble in Twelve.

=== V.U.P. ===
Short for Very Unimportant Person, he is the real Five Diamond reviewer who is the unwitting target of harassment and embarrassment by Danny's team in order for him to give Willy Bank's casino a disastrous review – tricking the casino owner into believing Kensington Chubb (Saul Bloom) is the reviewer. Rusty does make it up to the poor man at the airport by rigging a slot machine that gives him eleven million dollars.

Played by David Paymer in Thirteen.
