= Ocean's Thirteen =

2007 film by Steven Soderbergh

- Theatrical release poster
- Directed by: Steven Soderbergh
- Written by: Brian Koppelman; David Levien
- Based on: Characters by: George Clayton Johnson; Jack Golden Russell
- Produced by: Jerry Weintraub
- Starring: George Clooney; Brad Pitt; Matt Damon; Andy García; Don Cheadle; Bernie Mac; Ellen Barkin; Al Pacino; Casey Affleck; Scott Caan; Eddie Jemison; Shaobo Qin; Carl Reiner; Elliott Gould
- Cinematography: Peter Andrews
- Edited by: Stephen Mirrione
- Music by: David Holmes
- Production companies: Village Roadshow Pictures; Jerry Weintraub Productions; Section Eight Productions
- Distributed by: Warner Bros. Pictures
- Release dates: May 24, 2007 (Cannes); June 8, 2007 (United States)
- Running time: 122 minutes
- Country: United States
- Language: English
- Budget: $85 million
- Box office: $311.7 million

Ocean's Thirteen (stylized as Ocean's 13) is a 2007 American heist comedy film directed by Steven Soderbergh and written by Brian Koppelman and David Levien. It is the third film in the Ocean's trilogy. The film features an ensemble cast including George Clooney, Brad Pitt, Matt Damon, Andy García, Don Cheadle, Bernie Mac, Ellen Barkin, and Al Pacino.

Filming began in July 2006 in Las Vegas and Los Angeles. It was screened as an Out of Competition presentation at the 2007 Cannes Film Festival on May 24, 2007, and was theatrically released in the United States on June 8 by Warner Bros. Pictures. It received generally positive reviews from critics and grossed $312 million worldwide.

== Plot ==
Reuben Tishkoff builds a hotel-casino on the Las Vegas Strip. Against advice from his friend and erstwhile criminal partner Danny Ocean, he becomes involved with investor and casino mogul Willy Bank, who threatens to throw Tishkoff off the roof of the under-construction-resort if Tishkoff does not sign over his ownership stake to Bank. Bank only leaves Tishkoff with a $10,000 poker chip. As a result, Tishkoff suffers a heart attack and becomes bedridden. Ocean offers Bank a chance to set things right, but Bank refuses and completes the hotel, renamed "The Bank".

To avenge Tishkoff, Ocean gathers his crew to ruin Bank on the hotel's opening night. The crew's plan has two objectives:

- Prevent The Bank from winning the prestigious Five Diamond Award, which all of Bank's previous hotels have won. Saul Bloom acts as the anonymous Five Diamond reviewer, while the real one is treated horribly.
- Rig all of the casino's games to pay millions in winnings; Bank's casino must make $500 million in the first quarter to stay open. Otherwise, Bank will lose control of his hotel to the Board of Directors.

While they can implement various rigging mechanisms into the casino, Danny and his crew can be stopped by the Greco, a state-of-the-art artificial intelligence computer system that monitors gamblers' biometric responses and detects cheating. To disrupt the Greco, they plan to use a magnetron disguised as a cell phone as a gift to Bank. They also obtain the drilling machine used to bore the Channel Tunnel to simulate an earthquake under the casino to evacuate the premises. Their plan on opening night is to have Bank inadvertently disrupt the Greco with his new phone, initiate their rigged machines, as well as dealers on their payroll, and simulate the earthquake to force the evacuation, so that players leave with their winnings.

Shortly before opening night, the drill breaks down. The team is forced to ask Terry Benedict, their previous target, for funds to buy a replacement. He offers the money for a portion of the take. He dislikes Bank and demands that they steal Bank's private diamond collection that celebrates his Five Diamond Awards. The jewels are secured in a case at the top of the casino. Ocean has Linus Caldwell seduce Bank's assistant Abigail Sponder to gain access to the case. Secretly, Benedict contracts master thief François "The Night Fox" Toulour to intercept the diamonds.

Ocean institutes the final part of the plan by having FBI agents on his payroll arrive at the hotel and arrest Livingston Dell on suspicion of rigging the card-shuffling machines, allowing them to be replaced with actual rigged ones. The same FBI agent arrests Linus for switching the diamonds with fakes. The agent takes Linus away and he turns out to be his father Robert, whom Ocean enlisted. Trying to evacuate from the roof, they are intercepted by Toulour. He takes the diamonds off Linus and parachutes off the roof after tricking him with an unloaded pistol. However, Ocean anticipated this and never had Linus make the switch. Linus and his father escape in a helicopter piloted by Basher, tearing the case of diamonds out through the roof. The earthquake is triggered and the players evacuate with millions of dollars in winnings. Ocean tells Bank he is the mastermind and that they did it for Reuben. He reminds him that he cannot get revenge, since Danny knows all of Bank's associates, who prefer him over Bank. He also cannot go to the police due to Bank's illegal activities.

With their share of the winnings, Ocean's crew buy property on the Strip for Reuben to build his own casino. Ocean donates Benedict's $72 million portion of the take to charity in Benedict's name, forcing him to admit his philanthropy on The Oprah Winfrey Show. Ocean, Rusty, and Linus say goodbye at the airport. Before boarding his flight, Rusty gives his last coin to the real Five Diamond reviewer to play on a slot machine in the terminal. The reviewer, unaware it is rigged, wins $1 million and publicly celebrates his winnings as Rusty walks away grinning.

== Cast ==
=== The Thirteen ===
- George Clooney as Danny Ocean, an ex-con that comes up with a new heist involving The Bank.
- Brad Pitt as Rusty Ryan
- Matt Damon as Linus Caldwell
- Andy García as Terry Benedict
- Don Cheadle as Basher Tarr
- Bernie Mac as Frank Catton
- Eddie Izzard as Roman Nagel, a master thief and friend of Rusty who is brought in as a consultant.
- Casey Affleck as Virgil Malloy
- Scott Caan as Turk Malloy
- Carl Reiner as Saul Bloom
- Eddie Jemison as Livingston Dell
- Shaobo Qin as "The Amazing" Yen
- Elliott Gould as Reuben Tishkoff, Danny's friend who plans to make a new casino until he gets swindled by Willy.

=== Others ===
- Al Pacino as Willy Bank, a casino mogul who swindles Reuben of his money to further his hotel called The Bank.
- Ellen Barkin as Abigail Sponder, Willy's personal assistant.
- Vincent Cassel as François Toulour / The Night Fox, a master thief whom Benedict hires to beat Danny to Bank's diamonds.
- Bob Einstein as Bobby Caldwell, a legendary con artist and the father of Linus who was mentioned in the first two movies, and who poses as an FBI agent.
- David Paymer as the "V.U.P.", a Five Diamond reviewer who falls victim to the shenanigans of Danny's group.
- Jerry Weintraub as Denny Shields
- Olga Sosnovska as Debbie, the concierge at The Bank.
- Julian Sands as Greco Montgomery
- Don McManus as Neil, The Pit Boss
- Armen Weitzman as Eugene
- Angel Oquendo as Guard Ortega

== Production ==
In January 2006, it was reported that producers were in discussions about setting and shooting most of the film at the Wynn Las Vegas. Clooney had previously hoped to film it at his then-upcoming Las Ramblas Resort in Las Vegas, although the project would not have been ready in time for production. In March 2006, it was reported that the film would be shot in a fake casino that would be constructed on five Warner Bros. sound stages. Filming was expected to begin in Las Vegas and Los Angeles in July 2006. Al Pacino joined the cast in April 2006.

Location scouting took place in Las Vegas in mid-July 2006, with the Bellagio confirmed as a filming location, which was also used for scenes in Ocean's Eleven. Filming in Las Vegas began on August 7, 2006, with scenes shot at McCarran International Airport and at a heliport. The following day, filming moved to the Palazzo resort, which was under construction. Filming in Las Vegas concluded on August 9, 2006, after scenes involving Clooney, Pitt, Damon and García were shot in an office at the back of the Bellagio. Clooney and producer Jerry Weintraub were considering premiering the film in Las Vegas. Another Las Vegas shoot was scheduled for September 2006, including additional filming at the Bellagio.

Julia Roberts and Catherine Zeta-Jones did not appear in their respective roles as Tess Ocean and Isabel Lahiri due to the actresses not wanting to participate in the movie without a significant role, which the script would not accommodate. This is referenced early in the movie when Ocean mentions that it is "not their fight" when questioned about their absence by others in the group. Topher Grace, who made a cameo appearance in the previous two films as a heavily fictionalized version of himself, was unable to return due to reshoots on Spider-Man 3. He recalled that his planned cameo would have involved him having a conversation with Rusty while holding an Asian baby and never addressing the baby's origins.

== Reception ==
=== Box office ===
The film did well in its first weekend, reaching the top spot at the North American box office. Despite opening in 250 more theaters than Ocean's Twelve, it had a slightly weaker opening weekend, pulling in $36 million, compared with Twelve's $39 million. Ocean's Thirteen generated $117.1 million at the box office domestically, and $311.7 million worldwide.

=== Critical response ===
On review aggregation website Rotten Tomatoes, the film holds an approval rating of 70%, based on 201 reviews, and an average rating of 6.4/10. The website's critical consensus reads: "Ocean's Thirteen reverts to the formula of the first installment, and the result is another slick and entertaining heist film." On Metacritic, the film has a weighted average score of 62 out of 100, based on 37 critics, indicating "generally favorable" reviews. Audiences polled by CinemaScore gave the film an average grade of "B+" on a scale of A+ to F.

In his review for New York, David Edelstein wrote, "As the plotting gets knottier, [Soderbergh]'s technique gets more fluid—the editing jazzier, the colors more luscious, the whip-pans more whizbang. It's all anchored by Clooney, looking impudent, roguish, almost laughably handsome."

Manohla Dargis, in her review for The New York Times, wrote, "Playing inside the box and out, [Soderbergh] has learned to go against the grain while also going with the flow. In Ocean's Thirteen he proves that in spades by using color like Kandinsky and hanging a funny mustache on Mr. Clooney's luscious mug, having become a genius of the system he so often resists."

In his review for the Chicago Sun-Times, Roger Ebert gave the film two-and-a-half stars out of four, writing, "Ocean's Thirteen proceeds with insouciant dialogue, studied casualness, and a lotta stuff happening, none of which I cared much about because the movie doesn't pause to develop the characters, who are forced to make do with their movie-star personas."

Peter Bradshaw, in his review for The Guardian, wrote, "Sometimes we go to split-screen, and sometimes — whooaaa! — two of the split-screen frames are funkily showing the same thing. It is all quite meaningless. As if in an experimental novel by B. S. Johnson, the scenes could be reshuffled and shown in any order and it would amount to the same thing. There is no human motivation and no romance."

== Home media ==
Ocean's Thirteen was released on DVD and Blu-ray on November 13, 2007. Additionally, a 4K Ultra HD Blu-ray release including a SteelBook edition was released on April 30, 2024.

== Future ==
=== Potential sequel ===
A sequel to Ocean's Thirteen had been discussed as a possibility until the death of Bernie Mac. However, in June 2021, Don Cheadle revealed that Steven Soderbergh had been working on the concept of a sequel film. In July 2021, Matt Damon also expressed interest in returning to the franchise, while stating that the project is up to Soderbergh.

=== Spin-off ===
Ocean's 8, a spin-off of the Ocean's Trilogy films, is directed by Gary Ross and released in 2018. Sandra Bullock stars as Debbie Ocean, Danny Ocean's sister, opposite Cate Blanchett, Helena Bonham Carter, Anne Hathaway, Rihanna, Mindy Kaling, Sarah Paulson and Nora "Awkwafina" Lum, as a team who takes part in a heist at the Met Gala.

== See also ==
- List of films set in Las Vegas
