= Firehouse (TV series) =

1973 American television series

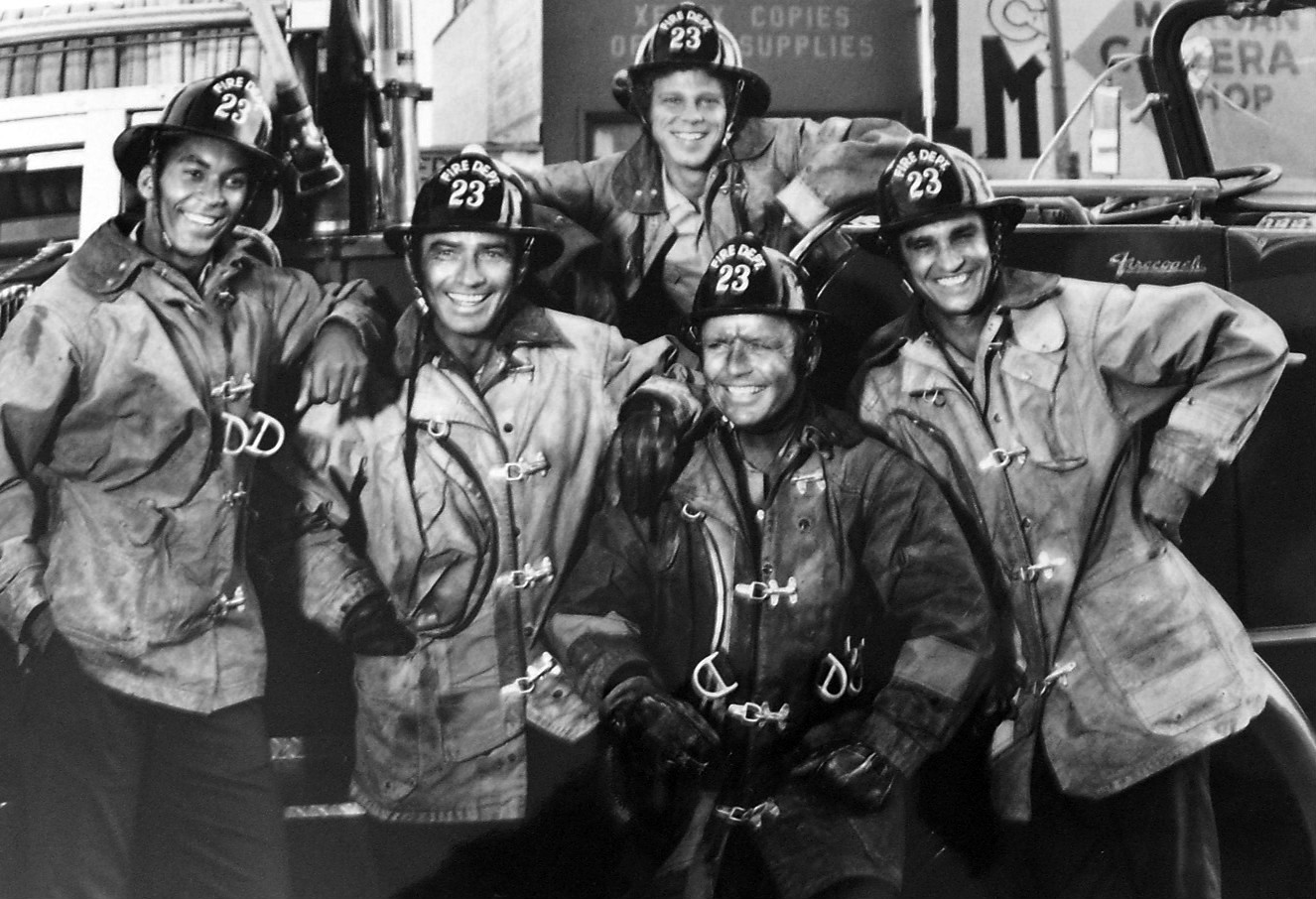
- From left: Bill Overton, James Drury, Brad David (in back), Richard Jaeckel (in front), Michael DeLano
- Starring: James Drury; Michael DeLano; Bill Overton; Scott Smith; Brad David; Richard Jaeckel
- Country of origin: United States
- Original language: English
- No. of seasons: 1
- No. of episodes: 13

Production
- Executive producers: Aaron Spelling; Leonard Goldberg
- Running time: 22 minutes
- Production companies: Dick Berg Productions for the Stonehenge Company; Metromedia Producers Corporation

Original release
- Network: ABC
- Release: January 17 – August 1, 1974

Firehouse is a half-hour American drama/adventure series that aired on ABC. A mid-season replacement, it started airing on January 17, 1974, and was cancelled after its 13-episode run. The series ran on Thursdays from 8:30 to 9:00 p.m., with the last rerun episode aired on August 1, 1974. The series starred James Drury as Captain Spike Ryerson.

== Pilot movie ==
The series pilot was broadcast in 1973 on the ABC Movie of the Week and starred Richard Roundtree and Richard Jaeckel. The pilot concerned a formerly all-white firehouse learning to accept a black rookie firefighter. All racial difficulties were dropped from the series.

Richard Jaeckel was the only actor to appear in both the pilot movie and the series.

== Cast ==
- James Drury as Capt. Spike Ryerson
- Richard Jaeckel as Hank Myers
- Michael DeLano as Sonny Caputo
- Brad David as Billy Dalzell
- Cal Dakin as Bill Overton

== Synopsis ==
Capt. Spike Ryerson acted as a father-figure to the young firefighters of Engine Company Number 23, of the Los Angeles Fire Department. Each episode had two stories, a fire to fight, and a rescue. Because of the 30 minute length there was not time to give depth to the characters, develop friendships, or discuss family life.

== Episodes ==
No.	Title	Original release date
1	"Burst of Flame"	January 17, 1974
Capt. Ryerson and his men race against time to save six people caught in an elevator in a blazing office building.
2	"Sentenced to Burn"	January 24, 1974
After rescuing a man from a mudslide, Capt. Ryerson and his men fight a fire at a prison and several are taken hostage by the convicts.
3	"The Hottest Place in Town"	January 31, 1974
Capt. Ryerson's men fight a devastating fire in a crowded new nightclub as well as the threat of rip-off artists in their own station house.
4	"Trapped"	February 7, 1974
After saving a man's new dump truck from fire, Capt. Ryerson and his men rush to a tunnel project.
5	"Implosion"	February 14, 1974
Capt. Ryerson and his men rescue a boy stuck in a heating duct, and then battle a spectacular oil refinery blaze.
6	"The Treasure"	February 21, 1974
After saving a pregnant woman trapped by downed high tension wires, Capt. Ryerson and his men rush to an old decaying mansion which is ablaze.
7	"Strike, Spare and Burn"	February 28, 1974
Capt. Ryerson and his men respond to a fire at an old theater building where a vault filled with potentially explosive nitrate film threatens the entire neighborhood.
8	"Tide of Terror"	March 7, 1974
After an ill-fated date with his girlfriend, Caputo joins his colleagues to help rescue a young woman trapped in swirling water under an ocean pier.
9	"No Way Out"	March 14, 1974
Capt. Ryerson and his men save a boy from being buried alive, and also fight a potentially devastating fire in a laundry.
10	"A Gift for Grumper"	March 21, 1974
Capt. Ryerson and his men struggle to save priceless art from a museum fire, not realizing that their friend, arson inspector "Grumper" Barkham is trapped in the blaze.
11	"Randall's Pride"	March 28, 1974
Capt. Ryerson's men save a girl who has driven over a cliff after an argument with her boyfriend, then respond to a fire which is destroying a horse stable.
12	"The Watches of the Night"	April 4, 1974
Capt. Ryerson's men battle a blaze in a slum apartment, then rescue partygoers at a top dress designer's first night celebration.
13	"False Alarm"	April 11, 1974
Capt. Ryerson is hospitalized for a possible heart ailment, and his worried men are called upon to save a young man suffering from a drug overdose, as well as battle a blaze in a junk-filled garage.
