= Hotel Pulitzer =

Hotel in Amsterdam

Pulitzer Amsterdam
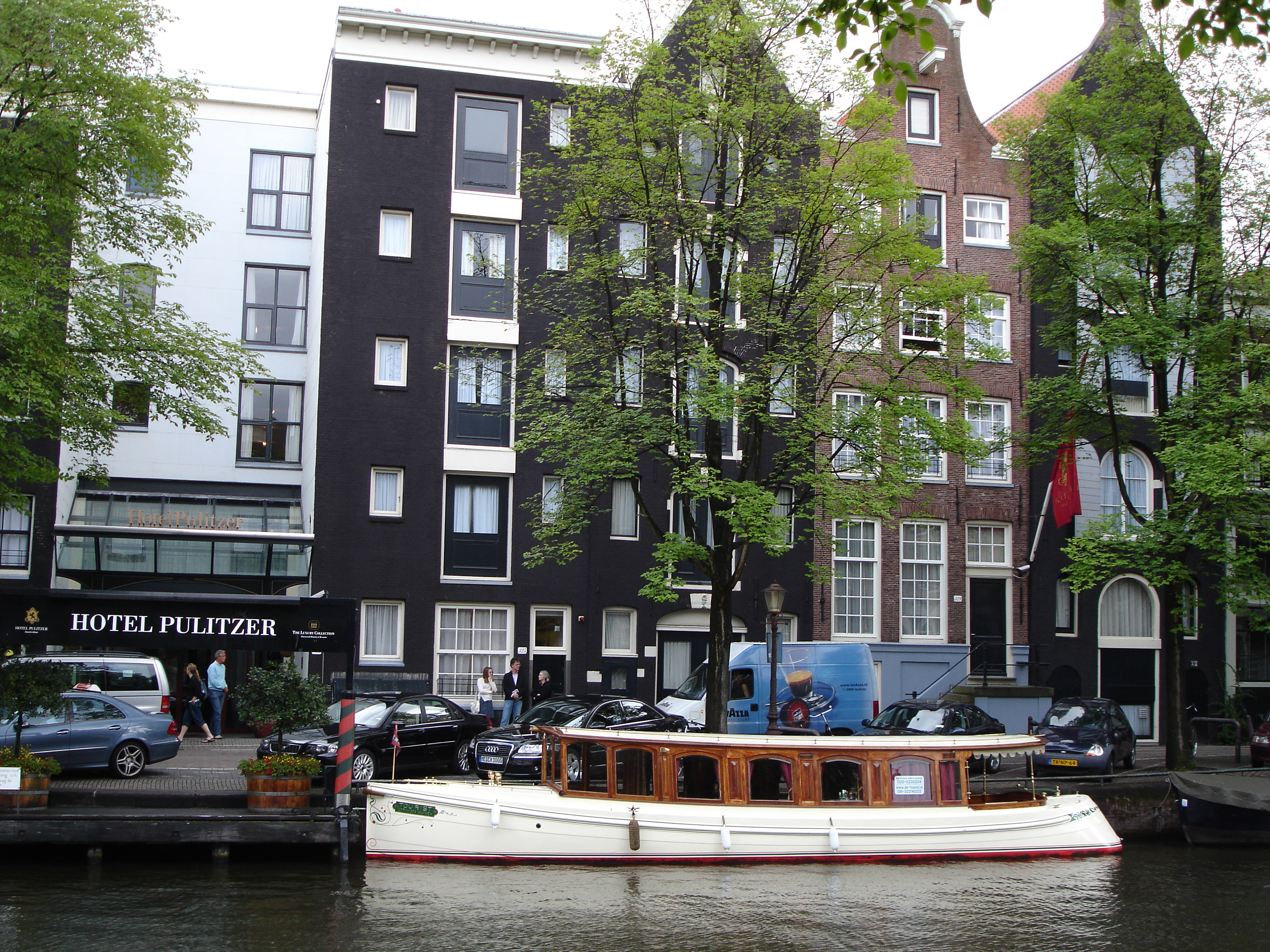
- Hotel front and canalboat The Tourist

- Location within Amsterdam

General information
- Location: Amsterdam, Netherlands
- Coordinates: 52°22′3″N 4°53′40″E
- Opening: October 27, 1970

Design and construction
- Developer: Howard Johnson's

Other information
- Number of rooms: 225

Pulitzer Amsterdam is a five star luxury hotel in Amsterdam, located on the Prinsengracht and Keizersgracht. The hotel consists of 25 historic canal houses from the 17th and 18th century, merged into one and opened as a hotel in 1970 after several canal houses were bought by Howard Johnson's.

== History ==
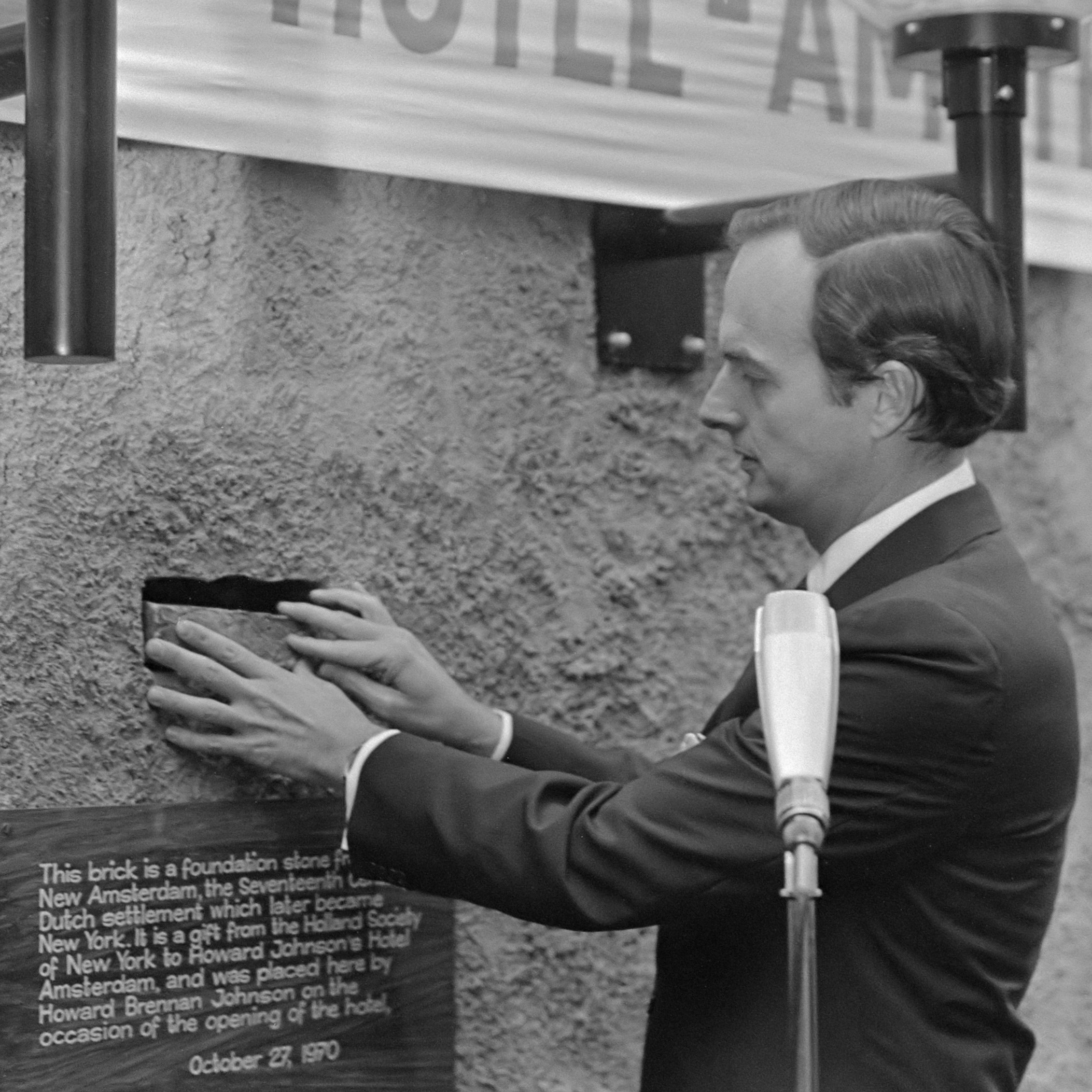
Howard Brennan Johnson at the hotel's grand opening, October 27, 1970

In 1614, the commissioners of Amsterdam began the new fortification of the city with the allocation of plots in the area situated between the Keizersgracht and the Prinsengracht and Reestraat. A number of canal houses in this area were built by the Technical Union. The garden houses on the Prinsengracht and empty warehouses were used as storage facilities for the Technical Union.

In 1968, the Howard Johnson's hotel chain joined with Koluma Hotel Maatschappij N.V. (a partnership of KLM and Herbert Peter Pulitzer, grandson of Joseph Pulitzer and heir to his publishing empire), to develop a hotel in Amsterdam. A group of adjoining buildings were bought, including nine buildings on the Prinsengracht (numbers 315-331), the pavilion of the Saxen Pennsylvania House and two houses on the Keizersgracht. A modern 176-room hotel was constructed within the buildings, which were joined behind their historic facades. The kitchen and a Howard Johnson's restaurant were located in the three houses on the Reestraat. The Howard Johnson's Hotel Amsterdam began accepting guests on June 28, 1970, and celebrated its grand opening on October 27, 1970, officiated by Howard Brennan Johnson. In 1972, Howard Johnson's pulled out of the partnership, and the hotel was renamed the Hotel Pulitzer, after Herbert Peter Pulitzer.

In 1975, the hotel expanded into two more buildings, adding twenty new rooms and apartments. In 1981, a building on Reestraat was added. The hotel later expanded into eight more buildings on the Keizersgracht. In 1992, Herbert Pulitzer sold the hotel to the Italian hotel chain CIGA. In 1994, CIGA was acquired by ITT Sheraton. In 1997, ITT Sheraton sold the hotel to Hospitality Europe Holding BV, although ITT Sheraton continued to manage the Pulitzer in their Luxury Collection division. The new owners completely renovated the property between 1998 and 2000. In 2013, the hotel was sold to London-based Global Holdings. The Hotel Pulitzer remained in The Luxury Collection, by now a part of Starwood Hotels and Resorts, until April 1, 2015, when it left Starwood and joined Preferred Hotels & Resorts. From 2015 to 2016, the hotel was renovated again, reducing the number of rooms to 225.

== Architecture ==
Pulitzer Amsterdam occupies 25 interconnected 17th- and 18th-century canal houses in Amsterdam’s UNESCO-protected canal district. Coverage of the 2015–16 redesign says Jacu Strauss led a restoration that preserved historic details such as wood beams and exposed brick while introducing a more contemporary interior scheme and themed “Collector’s Suites” inspired by former occupants of the houses. The redesign also introduced a new lobby and garden spaces.

== Facilities ==
Pulitzer Amsterdam has 225 rooms. The hotel offers family suites and has been included in travel guides to family-friendly hotels in Amsterdam. All of the rooms are non-smoking, in compliance with legal obligations in Amsterdam. The hotel has nine conference rooms, and the salons and reception facilities can accommodate up to 500 people. Independent city and guide sources describe Jansz as an all-day restaurant serving contemporary Dutch cuisine, while Pulitzer’s Bar is presented as a notable cocktail bar within the hotel.

The hotel has its own canal boat, moored on the Prinsengracht canal outside the hotel.

The hotel includes The Beauty House located in a canal house and is a beauty and wellness space in Amsterdam's Nine Streets district, added in 2024.

Vogue wrote in 2025 that The Beauty House had one treatment room, with capacity for five treatments per day, alongside nail and hair services in the open space.

The hotel also operates Pulitzer Garden, a dining venue facing the courtyard garden and outside terrace.

== In popular culture ==
The hotel appeared as one of the key Amsterdam filming locations in 2004 for the film Ocean’s Twelve. George Clooney, Brad Pitt, Matt Damon and the cast check into the hotel during the Amsterdam chapter of the film, with several scenes shot in and around the property.

== Awards ==
Travel + Leisure 2025 World’s Best Awards. #3 of 5 Favorite Hotels in Amsterdam

Michelin Guide 2025. One Michelin Key
