= Untitled Ocean's Eleven prequel =

- Directed by: Bradley Cooper
- Written by: Bradley Cooper
- Based on: Characters by: George Clayton Johnson; Jack Golden Russell
- Produced by: Tom Ackerley; Michelle Graham; Margot Robbie; Bradley Cooper
- Starring: Margot Robbie; Bradley Cooper; Wagner Moura; Monica Barbaro; Josh Gad; Vicky Krieps; George MacKay; Omar Sy; Lauren Ridloff; Jack Holden
- Cinematography: Ben Davis
- Production companies: Alcon Entertainment; Darko Entertainment; Everyman Pictures; LuckyChap Entertainment
- Distributed by: Warner Bros. Pictures
- Release date: June 25, 2027
- Country: United States
- Language: English

The untitled Ocean's Eleven prequel is an upcoming American heist comedy film written and directed by Bradley Cooper, who will star alongside Margot Robbie, Wagner Moura, and Monica Barbaro.

The film will be released in theaters on June 25, 2027, by Warner Bros. Pictures.

== Premise ==
A heist takes place in 1962 Monte Carlo.

== Cast ==
- Margot Robbie
- Bradley Cooper
- Wagner Moura
- Monica Barbaro
- Josh Gad
- Vicky Krieps
- George MacKay
- Omar Sy
- Lauren Ridloff
- Jack Holden

== Production ==
In May 2022, it was announced that Warner Bros. Pictures had in development a prequel for the Ocean's series, to be set in the 1960s, that would star Margot Robbie and be directed by Jay Roach. Pending an official greenlight, it was expected to begin production in Spring 2023. In August, it was reported that Ryan Gosling was in talks to join the film. In December 2023, it was revealed that Robbie and Gosling would portray Danny and Debbie's parents respectively, and that the title of the film was revealed as Oceans.

In July 2025, it was announced that Lee Isaac Chung would direct the film. In October, Gosling dropped out and Bradley Cooper was set to co-star opposite Robbie. In November, Benicio Del Toro was in talks to join the cast. In March 2026, Chung quit the project due to creative differences, with Cooper set to rewrite and direct the film. In June, Wagner Moura and Monica Barbaro joined the film, with Moura portraying the main antagonist. Josh Gad, Vicky Krieps, George MacKay, Omar Sy, Lauren Ridloff, and Jack Holden would be added the following month.

=== Filming ===
Principal photography began in July 2026 in Paris, with filming also due to occur in Nice and Monaco from August 24 to October 15, with Ben Davis serving as the cinematographer. Initially, under Roach, production was scheduled to begin in September 2024 in Monte Carlo, London and Italy, with Linus Sandgren initially set as the cinematographer before being delayed. Filming wrapped on November 4, 2026.

== Release ==
The untitled prequel to Ocean’s Eleven is set to be released on June 25, 2027, by Warner Bros. Pictures.
