= Ocean's Eleven =

2001 film by Steven Soderbergh

- Theatrical release poster
- Directed by: Steven Soderbergh
- Screenplay by: Ted Griffin
- Based on: Ocean's 11 by: Harry Brown; Charles Lederer; George Clayton Johnson; Jack Golden Russell
- Produced by: Jerry Weintraub
- Starring: George Clooney; Matt Damon; Andy García; Brad Pitt; Julia Roberts; Casey Affleck; Scott Caan; Elliott Gould; Bernie Mac; Carl Reiner
- Cinematography: Peter Andrews
- Edited by: Stephen Mirrione
- Music by: David Holmes
- Production companies: Village Roadshow Pictures; NPV Entertainment; Jerry Weintraub Productions; Section Eight Productions
- Distributed by: Warner Bros. Pictures
- Release date: December 7, 2001
- Running time: 116 minutes
- Country: United States
- Language: English
- Budget: $85 million
- Box office: $450.7 million

Ocean's Eleven is a 2001 American heist comedy film directed by Steven Soderbergh from a screenplay by Ted Griffin. The first installment in the Ocean's film trilogy, it is a remake of the 1960 Rat Pack film. The film features an ensemble cast including George Clooney, Matt Damon, Andy García, Brad Pitt, Julia Roberts, Casey Affleck, Don Cheadle, Scott Caan, Elliott Gould, Bernie Mac and Carl Reiner. The story follows friends Danny Ocean (Clooney) and Rusty Ryan (Pitt), who plan a heist of $160 million from casino owner Terry Benedict (García), the lover of Ocean's ex-wife Tess (Roberts).

Ocean's Eleven was theatrically released in the United States on December 7, 2001, by Warner Bros. Pictures. The film received positive reviews from critics and was a major box-office hit, grossing $450.7 million worldwide and becoming the fifth-highest-grossing film of 2001. Soderbergh directed two sequels, Ocean's Twelve in 2004 and Ocean's Thirteen in 2007. Ocean's 8, a spin-off with an all-female lead cast, was released in 2018.

== Plot ==
Professional thief Danny Ocean is paroled after four years in a New Jersey prison. He breaks his parole by traveling to Los Angeles and reunites with friend and colleague Rusty Ryan. They travel to Las Vegas to secure financial backing from wealthy friend Reuben Tishkoff for a multi-million dollar heist to rob three casinos owned by Tishkoff's ruthless rival, Terry Benedict: the Bellagio, Mirage, and MGM Grand. Legally required to have enough cash to cover all casino patrons' bets, Danny estimates that during an upcoming high-profile boxing match, the casinos will hold over $150 million in an underground vault guarded by virtually unassailable security measures and systems. Having been forced out of his casino by Benedict, Tishkoff readily agrees to participate.

Danny and Rusty recruit eight accomplices: con man Frank Catton, retired con man Saul Bloom, auto specialists Virgil and Turk Malloy, explosives expert Basher Tarr, surveillance technician Livingston Dell, acrobat Yen, and pickpocket Linus Caldwell. A precise replica of the vault is built to practice the heist, and team members are assigned to infiltrate or surveil the Bellagio to assess the security, staff routines, and the building's layout. Linus, tasked with tracking Benedict, discovers he is dating Danny's ex-wife, Tess. Believing Danny's motive is driven by wanting to reunite with Tess, Rusty wants to call off the heist, but Danny refuses. Danny later meets with Tess, who is still hurting from their failed relationship, and also Benedict, who has Danny barred from his casinos.

The team commences the heist while Danny enters the Bellagio. Benedict has him detained in a surveillance-free room to be beaten by Bruiser, who secretly works with Danny. Danny reaches the vault elevator through the vent and meets up with Linus, who has infiltrated the casino as a state gaming official. Meanwhile, Saul, disguised as a wealthy foreigner, persuades Benedict to secure a briefcase containing jewels—actually disguised explosives—in the casino vault. Virgil and Turk smuggle Yen into the vault in a casino trolley. Basher triggers a stolen EMP device which disables electricity across Las Vegas, including the laser grid protecting the elevator shaft, allowing Danny and Linus to descend to the vault entrance. The pair neutralizes the guards and, with Yen, use Saul's explosive "jewels" to destroy the vault locks and secure the cash.

Rusty calls Benedict and reveals the robbery, blackmailing him to surrender half the cash to a van waiting outside or else all the money will be blown up. Verifying the compromised vault by camera, Benedict complies, but has his men pursue the van while summoning a SWAT team to retake the vault. During the SWAT team's assault the explosives are detonated, destroying the remaining half of the cash while the thieves seemingly escape. Meanwhile, the van is discovered to be under remote control and the money bags filled with paper advertisements. Benedict dismisses the SWAT team before realizing that the video footage was faked because the Bellagio logo, a recent addition, was not on the vault's floor; the footage was from the team's replica vault.

It is revealed that, after intercepting the 911 call, the team entered the casino disguised as SWAT members and left the vault with duffel bags containing over $160 million in cash. Danny returns to the secure room before Benedict arrives to confront him. Tess receives a call telling her to watch her TV which shows a surveillance camera feed of Danny tricking Benedict into admitting that he would give up Tess in exchange for the money's return. Unable to connect Danny to the heist, Benedict instead gets him arrested for parole violation; Danny and Tess reconcile before he is taken away. As dawn breaks, the remaining team contemplates their victory before going their separate ways.

Several months later, Danny is released from prison and picked up by Rusty and Tess. They drive off, knowingly followed by Benedict's men.

== Cast ==
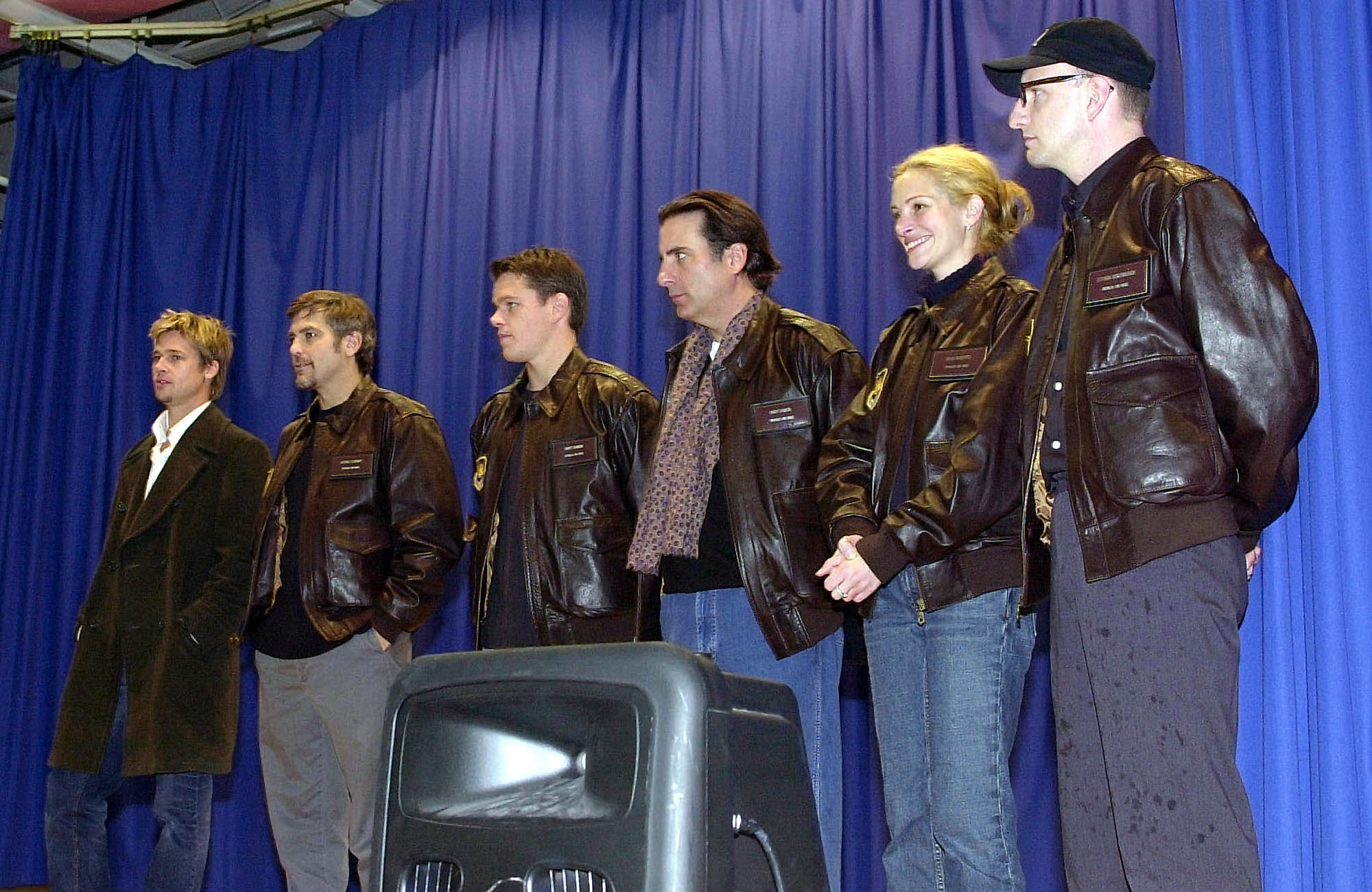
Brad Pitt, George Clooney, Matt Damon, Andy Garcia, Julia Roberts, and Steven Soderbergh in December 2001

=== The Eleven ===
In order of recruitment:

- George Clooney as Danny Ocean, an ex-con who establishes a heist
- Bernie Mac as Frank Catton, a discredited croupier and con man
- Brad Pitt as Robert "Rusty" Ryan, Danny's friend and partner in crime
- Elliott Gould as Reuben Tishkoff, a former casino owner who is Danny's wealthy friend
- Casey Affleck as Virgil Malloy, a gifted mechanic
- Scott Caan as Turk Malloy, a gifted mechanic and Virgil's brother
- Eddie Jemison as Livingston Dell, an electronics and surveillance expert
- Don Cheadle as Basher Tarr, an explosives expert
- Qin Shaobo as "The Amazing" Yen, a silent acrobat
- Carl Reiner as Saul Bloom, an elderly con man
- Matt Damon as Linus Caldwell, a pickpocket who aids Danny

=== The Casino ===
- Andy García as Terry Benedict, the owner of the robbed casinos and Reuben's rival
- Julia Roberts as Tess Ocean, Danny's ex-wife and Terry's girlfriend
- Scott L. Schwartz as Bruiser, hired muscle for Benedict who's actually working for Ocean
- Michael DeLano as Frank Walsh, Terry's casino manager and second in command
- Richard Reed as Bucky Buchanan, someone who knows Saul from the past and almost ruins the heist at a point
- David & Larry Sontag as "The Power Twins", two bodyguards/hired muscle working for Benedict

=== Cameos ===
- Five television actors make cameos as themselves, being taught how to play poker by Rusty:
  - Holly Marie Combs
  - Topher Grace
  - Joshua Jackson
  - Barry Watson
  - Shane West
- Jerry Weintraub as Denny Shields, a high-roller gambler
- Siegfried & Roy as themselves
- Wayne Newton as himself
- Henry Silva and Angie Dickinson as themselves (both appeared in the original film)
- Eydie Gormé and her husband Steve Lawrence as themselves
- Boxers Wladimir Klitschko and Lennox Lewis as themselves
- Boxing commentator Larry Merchant and sportscaster James Lampley as themselves

== Production ==
In 1987, David Permut, who had produced a film adaptation of the 1950s TV show Dragnet, declared his intention to remake the 1960 film, but the project never materialized. In January 2000, Warner Bros. was reported to be moving forward with Steven Soderbergh on development of an Ocean's Eleven remake, starring George Clooney, Brad Pitt and Julia Roberts. Johnny Depp was being considered for Linus Caldwell, while Luke and Owen Wilson were in discussions to play the Malloy twins. The Wilson brothers had to decline due to their commitment to The Royal Tenenbaums. Mike Myers, Bruce Willis, Ewan McGregor, Alan Arkin and Ralph Fiennes were considered for roles but also ended up dropping out. Willis said in 2007 that he regretted turning down the role of Terry Benedict, and that he had done so because when he saw the script the character was not finished. Filmmakers Joel and Ethan Coen were considered as replacements for the Wilson brothers, but Soderbergh cast Caan and Affleck instead. Mark Wahlberg was originally cast as Caldwell, but left in favor of starring in another remake, Planet of the Apes, and was subsequently replaced with Damon. Clooney's commitment to Ocean's Eleven forced him to turn down the lead role in Unfaithful.

Ocean's Eleven was filmed between February 11 and June 7, 2001, primarily in Las Vegas, but with some scenes shot in New Jersey, Chicago, Los Angeles, Florida, and Burbank. As producer Jerry Weintraub was friends with the Bellagio's owner, Kirk Kerkorian, the production team was granted permission to film there; also, the cast stayed at the hotel during the shoot. The "pinch" used in the film to black out power in Las Vegas was based on the real-life Sandia Z-pinch. However, the effect shown is unrealistic, as no device of the size shown could achieve that effect.

Cheadle was uncredited for his role. In an interview, Cheadle said, "there was some stuff that happened behind the scenes that I didn’t like how it went down, so I just said, 'Take my name off it.'"

== Music ==
- "Cha Cha Cha" written by James D'Angelo, Leo Johns, Jimmy Kelleher, Marc Lanjean, Henri Salvador and Marcel Stellman; performed by Jimmy Luxury and The Tommy Rome Orchestra
- "The Projects" (P Jays) written by Dan Nakamura, Paul Huston, Tarin Jones and Trugoy the Dove (as David Jolicoeur); performed by Handsome Boy Modeling School featuring De La Soul (as Trugoy (De La Soul)) and Del (as Del tha Funkee Homosapien)
- "Papa Loves Mambo" written by Al Hoffman, Dick Manning and Bickley Reichner; performed by Perry Como
- "Take My Breath Away" written by Giorgio Moroder and Tom Whitlock; performed by Berlin
- "Spirit in the Sky" written and performed by Norman Greenbaum
- "Blues in the Night" written by Harold Arlen and Johnny Mercer; performed by Quincy Jones
- "Caravan" written by Duke Ellington and Juan Tizol; performed by Arthur Lyman
- "A Little Less Conversation" written by Billy Strange and Mac Davis; performed by Elvis Presley
- "Gritty Shaker" written and performed by David Holmes
- "Spanish Flea" written by Julius Wechter; performed by Powerpack Orchestra
- "Misty" composed by Erroll Garner; performed by Liberace
- "Dream, Dream, Dream" written by Jimmy McHugh, Jean Pierre Mottier, Mitchell Parish and Jeannine Melle; performed by Percy Faith and His Orchestra
- "Moon River" written by Henry Mancini and Johnny Mercer; performed by Liberace
- "Theme from A Summer Place" written by Max Steiner
- "Theme for Young Lovers" written and performed by Percy Faith and His Orchestra
- "69 Police" written by David Holmes, Phil Mossman, Darren Morris, Aldo Tagliapietra, Stanley Walden and Giovanni Smeraldi; performed by David Holmes (remix of the Le Orme song "Ad Gloriam")
- "Clair de Lune" composed for piano solo by Claude Debussy and arranged for orchestra by Lucien Cailliet; performed by The Philadelphia Orchestra; conducted by Eugene Ormandy

== Reception ==
=== Critical response ===
On Rotten Tomatoes, the film has an approval rating of 83% based on 188 reviews. The site's critical consensus reads, "As fast-paced, witty, and entertaining as it is star-studded and coolly stylish, Ocean's Eleven offers a well-seasoned serving of popcorn entertainment." On Metacritic, the film has a weighted average score of 74 out of 100, based on 35 critics, indicating "generally favorable reviews". Audiences polled by CinemaScore gave the film an average grade of "B+" on an A+ to F scale.

People magazine called the film "pure fun from start to finish", and included it in its end-of-year Best of Screen list. Newsweek said Ocean's Eleven "bounces along with finger-snapping high spirits", and said that while Soderbergh has "made deeper films, ...this carefree caper movie is nothing to sneeze at". Time magazine's reviewer Richard Corliss criticized the film, saying it "doesn't offer much". In a poll during November 2008, Empire magazine called Ocean's Eleven the 500th best film on The 500 Greatest Movies of All Time. For Don Cheadle's role in this film, he needed to learn to speak with a cockney accent, which drew harsh reviews from critics and is recognized as being one of the worst accents in film. Cheadle commented on his accent, saying "My British friends ... tell me [it's] a truly terrible London accent in Ocean's Thirteen. You know something, I really worked on that accent. Went to London, spoke to people, got to know it... my agent said it was fine, so I'm stuck with this thing. Even though everyone laughs at me. So I sacked her, of course."

Entertainment Weekly put "The Ocean's Eleven heist scene" on its end-of-the-decade, "best-of" list, saying, "Featuring three impregnable Vegas casinos and 11 ring-a-ding criminals, Steven Soderbergh's 2001 roll of the dice provided the most winning robbery sequence of the decade." In 2021, members of Writers Guild of America West (WGAW) and Writers Guild of America, East (WGAE) voted its screenplay 75th in WGA’s 101 Greatest Screenplays of the 21st Century (so far).

=== Box office ===
Ocean's Eleven had a budget of about $85 million. On its opening weekend, it grossed an estimate of $38.1 million and was the top box-office draw for the weekend, dethroning Harry Potter and the Philosopher's Stone. The film surpassed What Women Want to have the highest December opening weekend. That record was very brief, as it was quickly surpassed by The Lord of the Rings: The Fellowship of the Ring two weeks later. Moreover, Ocean's Eleven had the largest opening weekend for both a Brad Pitt film and a Julia Roberts film, beating Interview with the Vampire and Runaway Bride simultaneously. It also had the third-highest opening weekend for any film starring George Clooney, behind Batman & Robin and The Perfect Storm. The film grossed $183,418,150 in the United States, $267,311,379 overseas, totaling $450,728,529 worldwide. It would become George Clooney's highest-grossing film until Gravity overtook it in 2013.

== Home media ==
Ocean's Eleven was released on VHS and DVD on May 7, 2002.

== Sequels ==
Soderbergh directed two sequels, Ocean's Twelve in 2004 and Ocean's Thirteen in 2007, which make up the Ocean's Trilogy.

Ocean's 8, with an all-female cast led by Sandra Bullock, was released June 8, 2018. It was conceived by producer Jerry Weintraub, Soderbergh and Clooney. Olivia Milch and Gary Ross were writer of the screenplay, and director respectively. Cate Blanchett, Helena Bonham Carter, Anne Hathaway, Sarah Paulson, Rihanna, Mindy Kaling and Awkwafina made up the ensemble cast.

== Other adaptations ==
Takarazuka Revue adapted the movie as a musical in 2011–2012 in Japan (Takarazuka Grand Theater; Tokyo Takarazuka Theater). The production was performed by Star Troupe and the cast included Reon Yuzuki as Danny Ocean, Nene Yumesaki as Tess Ocean and Shio Suzumi as Rusty Ryan.

The 2014 Bollywood film Happy New Year draws heavily on the plot of Ocean's Eleven, with Shah Rukh Khan starring as the protagonist.

== See also ==
- List of films set in Las Vegas
