= Ocean's Twelve =

2004 film by Steven Soderbergh

- Theatrical release poster
- Directed by: Steven Soderbergh
- Written by: George Nolfi
- Based on: Characters by: George Clayton Johnson; Jack Golden Russell
- Produced by: Jerry Weintraub
- Starring: George Clooney; Brad Pitt; Matt Damon; Catherine Zeta-Jones; Andy García; Don Cheadle; Bernie Mac; Julia Roberts; Casey Affleck; Scott Caan; Vincent Cassel; Eddie Jemison; Carl Reiner; Elliott Gould
- Cinematography: Peter Andrews
- Edited by: Stephen Mirrione
- Music by: David Holmes
- Production companies: Village Roadshow Pictures; Jerry Weintraub Productions; Section Eight Productions
- Distributed by: Warner Bros. Pictures
- Release date: December 10, 2004
- Running time: 125 minutes
- Country: United States
- Language: English
- Budget: $110 million
- Box office: $362.9 million

Ocean's Twelve is a 2004 American heist comedy film directed by Steven Soderbergh and written by George Nolfi. The second installment in the Ocean's film trilogy franchise and the sequel to Ocean's Eleven (2001), the film features an ensemble cast including George Clooney, Brad Pitt, Matt Damon, Catherine Zeta-Jones, Andy García, Don Cheadle, Bernie Mac, Julia Roberts, Casey Affleck, Scott Caan, Vincent Cassel, Eddie Jemison, Carl Reiner, and Elliott Gould.

Ocean's Twelve was released theatrically in the United States on December 10, 2004, by Warner Bros. Pictures. The film received mixed reviews from critics and grossed $362.9 million worldwide, becoming the tenth-highest-grossing film of 2004. It was followed by Ocean's Thirteen (2007), with Soderbergh and most of the cast again returning.

== Plot ==
Terry Benedict locates all eleven members of Danny Ocean's crew, demanding they return the $160 million they stole from his casinos plus $38 million in interest. He gives them a two-week deadline to return the money, under the threat that he will have them arrested or killed.

Short by half the amount, the group schemes to stage a heist in Amsterdam to avoid problems with U.S. authorities. Saul decides not to participate since he is too old for another grand heist. They are tipped off by an informant named Matsui about the location of the first stock certificate ever issued. After a complex series of schemes, they find the document has already been stolen by master thief the "Night Fox". Europol detective Isabel Lahiri is called in to investigate the theft and realizes that she gave Rusty the idea of how to solve a complication of the heist with a description of a similar burglary during their earlier relationship. Surprising the group at their accommodation, she warns them they cannot beat the Night Fox or his mentor, the mysterious master thief "Gaspar LeMarc", both of whom excel in the "long con", and steals Rusty's phone. She has been hunting both for years.

Danny and his crew discover that the Night Fox is François Toulour, a wealthy French baron and gentleman thief with a villa on Lake Como. Danny goes to the villa and steals Toulour's paintings. Confronting Toulour, Ocean learns that Toulour exposed their identities to Benedict (breaking the code of silence among thieves) and hired Matsui to inform the crew about the stock certificate so as to meet with Danny. Toulour is outraged when LeMarc suggested Danny may be a better thief than him, so he challenges him to steal the Imperial Coronation Fabergé egg. If Danny and his crew win, he will pay off their debt to Benedict.

The crew begin to plan an elaborate heist to swap the egg for a holographic recreation, but Toulour gives the camera recordings from his villa to Lahiri, who deduces that they want to steal the egg through an intercepted phone call to Rusty. She then captures most of the crew except Linus, Basher, Turk, and Saul. Linus comes up with a second plan involving Danny's wife, Tess, posing as a pregnant Julia Roberts in order to get close to the egg and swap it. They are foiled by Lahiri and a coincidentally present Bruce Willis, and the rest of the group members are captured. Lahiri is told that they are to be extradited to the U.S., while Linus is chosen first to be interrogated by the FBI agent assigned to collect them. The agent is actually Linus's mother, who organizes the release of the whole gang. She points out to Lahiri that she will face consequences for forging a signature on a Europol form to obtain the necessary arrest warrants for Ocean's gang.

Sometime later, Danny and Tess return to Toulour's villa, where Toulour expresses glee at their failure. He explains that he stole the egg at night using his agility and dancing skills to evade the museum's heavy security. Toulour's celebration is short-lived when Danny reveals that his group stole the real egg while it was in transit to the museum, and Toulour realizes they were tipped off by LeMarc. A flashback reveals that Danny and Rusty had met LeMarc earlier when he revealed his confidence trick intended to humiliate Toulour and, at the same time, restore to himself the Fabergé egg that he had stolen years ago but returned following his wife's wishes. Toulour is forced to admit that Danny won the bet and gives him the money for the debt to Benedict.

Rusty takes Lahiri to a safe house that he claims has been lent to him by LeMarc. There, she is reunited with her father, who is revealed to be the man she has been pursuing for years: LeMarc. Reuben meets with Benedict to give him the check to pay back the crew's debt. As Reuben promises that none of them will perform any more heists in Benedict's casinos, Toulour is seen in the background spying on them.

== Cast ==
=== The Twelve ===
- George Clooney as Danny Ocean, an ex-con who leads his group in a heist across Europe
- Brad Pitt as Robert "Rusty" Ryan, Danny's friend and second-in-command
- Matt Damon as Linus Caldwell, a known pickpocket
- Bernie Mac as Frank Catton, an ex-croupier
- Elliott Gould as Reuben Tishkoff, a wealthy friend of Danny
- Casey Affleck as Virgil Malloy, an expert mechanic
- Scott Caan as Turk Malloy, an expert mechanic and the brother of Virgil
- Eddie Jemison as Livingston Dell, a surveillance expert
- Don Cheadle as Basher Tarr, an explosives expert
- Shaobo Qin as "The Amazing" Yen, an acrobat
- Carl Reiner as Saul Bloom, an elderly con man
- Julia Roberts as Tess Ocean, the wife of Danny
  - Roberts also portrays herself in the film in a scene where Tess is impersonating Julia Roberts as part of the con and her character is talking on the phone with her real self.

=== Friends of the Twelve ===
- Eddie Izzard as Roman Nagel, a master thief whom Danny knows
- Cherry Jones as Mrs. Caldwell, aka FBI Agent Molly Starr, the mother of Linus
- Albert Finney as Gaspar LeMarc (uncredited), a former master thief and the mentor of Toulour
- Jared Harris as Basher's Engineer

=== Enemies of the Twelve ===
- Catherine Zeta-Jones as Isabel Lahiri, a Europol detective
- Andy García as Terry Benedict
- Vincent Cassel as Baron François Toulour, aka "The Night Fox", aka "Moretti", a master thief
- Michael DeLano as Frank Walsh, casino manager.

=== Cameos ===
- Bruce Willis as himself
- Topher Grace as himself
- Jerry Weintraub as Denny Shields (uncredited)

=== Others ===
- Robbie Coltrane as Ian Nicholas McNally, aka "Matsui", an informant with connections to Danny
- Jeroen Krabbé as Van Der Woude
- Candice Azzara as Saul Bloom's Girlfriend

== Production ==
The script was reworked when Julia Roberts learned she was pregnant with twins.

The film was shot in 2003 in Atlantic City, New Jersey; in St. Petersburg, Florida; and in Las Vegas at the Bellagio Hotel. Filming also took place in Chicago, Amsterdam, Paris, Monte Carlo, Lake Como (at Villa Erba in Cernobbio), Rome, and Castellammare del Golfo in Sicily. The production spent three weeks in the Netherlands; scenes were filmed in the KattenKabinet, the Hotel Pulitzer, the Haarlem railway station, and The Hague City Hall. In Paris, scenes were shot at the Sorbonne, the Australian Embassy, and the Gare du Nord. Afterwards, filming moved to Italy. The Monte Carlo Casino and the Villa Erba (on Lake Como) also served as filming locations.

== Reception ==
On review aggregation website Rotten Tomatoes, the film holds an approval rating of 55% based on 188 reviews, and an average rating of 5.9/10. The website's critical consensus reads, "While some have found the latest star-studded heist flick to be a fun, glossy star vehicle, others declare it's lazy, self-satisfied and illogical." On Metacritic, the film has a weighted average score of 58 out of 100, based on 39 critics, indicating "mixed or average reviews". This made it the lowest-rated Ocean's film on both websites. Audiences polled by CinemaScore gave the film an average grade of "B−" on an A+ to F scale, the lowest of all films in the Ocean's franchise.

The film was criticized for its slow start, its complex plot and a final twist that negated much of the preceding action. The Washington Post's Stephen Hunter said that "it all ends on one of those infuriatingly sloppy notes where, having dramatized narrative events WXYZ for us, which we have taken on good faith, it suddenly and arbitrarily delivers narrative events STUV, which completely invalidate events WXYZ." Newsweek said that "while it looks like the cast is having a blast and a half, the studied hipness can get so pleased with itself it borders on the smug." Claudia Puig with USA Today remarked, "At the rate things are going, all of Hollywood will put in about a day's work on Ocean's Seventeen." Ocean's Twelve was rated by Entertainment Weekly as one of "The 25 Worst Sequels Ever Made".

In a positive review for the Chicago Sun-Times, Roger Ebert gave the film three out of four stars and applauded its cleverness: "The movie takes inventory of its characters with the same droll wit it does everything else ... The movie is all about behavior, dialogue, star power and wiseass in-jokes. I really sort of liked it." Steven Soderbergh has stated that it is his favorite of the then-three Ocean's films.

== Soundtrack ==
The original soundtrack to Ocean's Twelve was released by Warner Bros. Records on December 7, 2004. David Holmes returned to compose the music for the film and won a BMI award.

Holmes' songs "Amsterdam" and "I Love Art...Really!" were released as singles and do not appear on the commercial soundtrack LP. The track "The Real Story" on the album is different in the film, which uses "Rito a Los Angeles" by Peppino de Luca, featuring part of the main riff of "In-A-Gadda-Da-Vida". The album also lacks "Thé à la Menthe" performed by La Caution, used during the Night Fox "laser-dance" sequence, "Margaret" by Giuseppe De Luca, which plays as the group are escorted from the police station, and "El Capitalismo Foraneo" by Gotan Project, which plays as Lahiri cracks Matsui.

"Ascension to Virginity", which was included on the album, was taken from the soundtrack of the 1968 movie Candy, where it likewise appeared in the epilogue.

All songs by David Holmes unless otherwise noted

1. "L'appuntamento" by Roberto Carlos, Erasmo Carlos and Bruno Lauzi, performed by Ornella Vanoni – 4:35
2. "$165 Million + Interest" (into) "The Round Up" – 5:43
3. "L.S.D. Partie" by Roland Vincent – 2:59
4. "Lifting the Building" – 2:34
5. "10:35 I Turn Off Camera 3" – 2:25
6. "Crepuscolo sul mare" by Piero Umiliani – 2:44
7. "What R We Stealing" – 3:21
8. "Faust 72" by Dynastie Crisis – 3:23
9. "Stealing the Stock" (into) "Le Renard de Nuit" – 4:53
10. "7/29/04 The Day Of" – 3:11
11. "Lazy [Album Version]" by Yellow Hammer – 4:30
12. "Explosive Corrosive Joseph" by John Schroeder – 2:33
13. "Yen on a Carousel" – 3:13
14. "The Real Story" – 2:55
15. "Ascension to Virginity" by Dave Grusin – 5:05
16. "Three 8 Bar Drum Loops" – 1:02 (hidden track)

Album tracklist cited

== Sequel ==
A sequel, titled Ocean's Thirteen was released in 2007, also directed by Steven Soderbergh. It is the third installment in the Ocean's franchise, and the final film in the Ocean's Trilogy. All the male cast members reprised their roles, with Al Pacino and Ellen Barkin joining the cast, but neither Julia Roberts nor Catherine Zeta-Jones returned.
