= Eddie Jemison =

American film and television actor (born 1963)

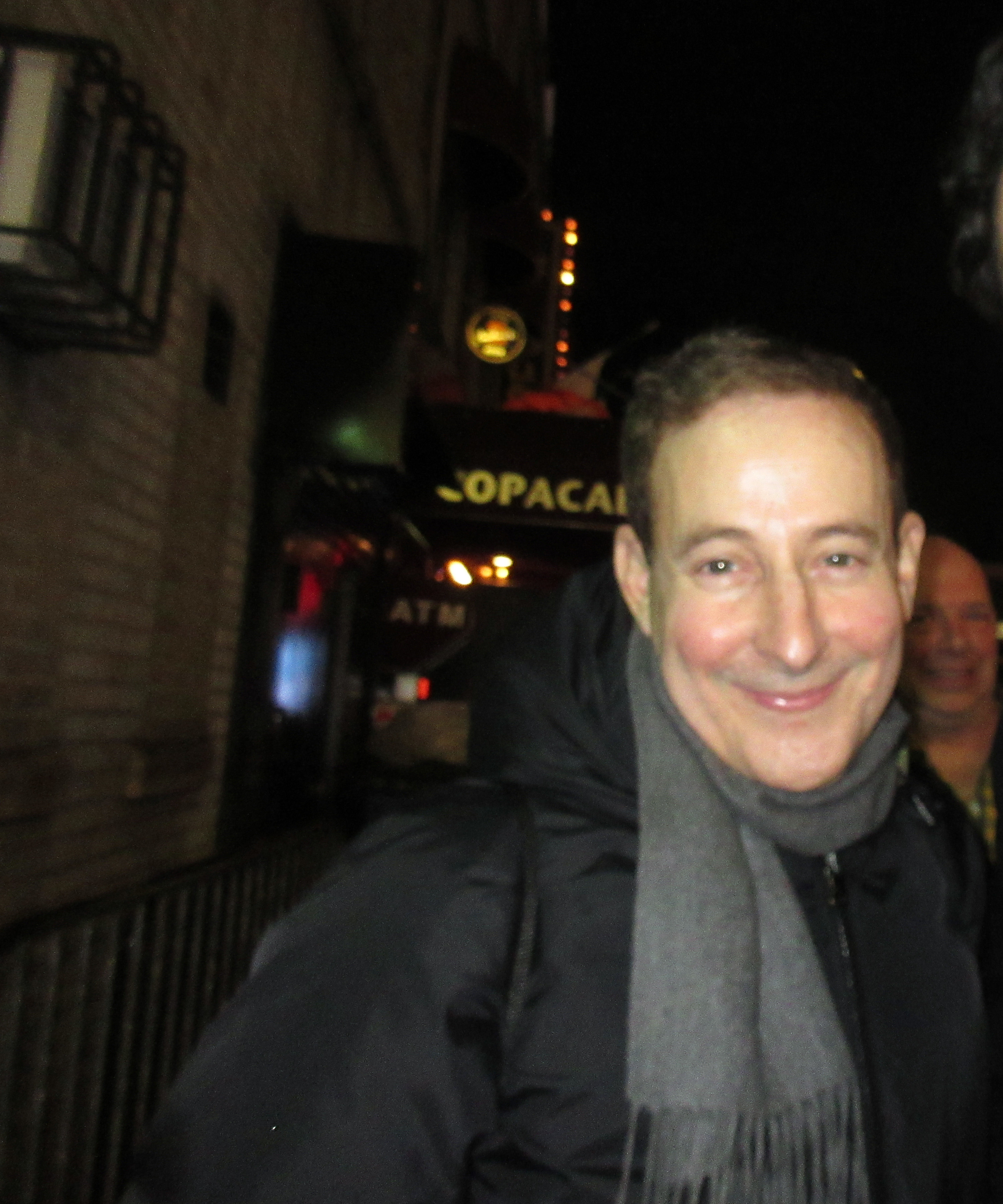
- Eddie Jemison in 2019
- Born: Edward Francis Jemison, Jr. November 25, 1963 (age 62); New Orleans, Louisiana, U.S.
- Education: Louisiana State University
- Occupation: Actor
- Years active: 1995–present
- Spouse: Laura Lamson
- Children: Daisy (daughter), Jasper (son)

Edward Francis Jemison, Jr. (born November 25, 1963) is an American film and television actor. He is known for his roles as Livingston Dell in the Ocean's film trilogy and Mickey Duka in The Punisher, as well as the television series Hung, iZombie and Chicago Med.

== Early life ==
Jemison was born in New Orleans, Louisiana, the son of Rosalie (née Centanni) and Edward Francis Jemison, Sr. and is of Irish and Italian descent. He was raised in Kenner, Louisiana, and attended a Catholic secondary school, Archbishop Rummel High School. He graduated from Louisiana State University where he was a member of the Delta Chi fraternity.

== Career ==
As an actor in films, Jemison's major breakthrough was the Ocean's franchise, a series of movies in which he played Livingston Dell. He made his directorial debut in 2013 with an independent film called King of Herrings, starring himself and longtime friends Joe Chrest and John Mese, who both also came out of LSU's theatre department. Jemison's wife, Laura Lamson, co-starred in the film as well.

=== Television career ===
In the mid-1990s, before launching a film career, he starred in a series of Bud Light commercials with the tagline "Yes, I am". This catchphrase, "Yes, I am," has stuck to Jemison over the years, to the point that he became a little weary of being the "Yes, I am" guy. Other major commercial credits for Jemison included a Wheaties commercial with basketball star Michael Jordan and an appearance alongside football star Joe Montana. Online, Jemison starred in the web series Self Storage. Jemison has also appeared on Late Night with David Letterman.

== Filmography ==
=== Film ===
Year	Title	Role	Notes
1996	Schizopolis	Nameless Numberhead Man	Uncredited
2001	Ocean's Eleven	Livingston Dell	
2003	Bruce Almighty	Bobby	
2004	The Punisher	Mickey Duka	
2004	Ocean's Twelve	Livingston Dell	
2006	Rampage: The Hillside Strangler Murders	Kantor	
2007	Waitress	Ogie Anhorn	
2007	Ocean's Thirteen	Livingston Dell	
2007	On the Doll	Mr. Garrett	
2007	Nancy Drew	Adoption Clerk	
2009	Ingenious	Bean	
2009	Bob Funk	Ron Funk	
2009	All About Steve	Psychiatrist with Crossword Puzzle	Uncredited
2009	The Informant!	Kirk Schmidt	
2010	Miss Nobody	Joshua Nether	
2011	Lovelock, CA	Willian	Short Film
2013	Coffee, Kill Boss	Henry Wood	
2013	King of Herrings	Ditch	
2014	Veronica Mars	JC Borden	
2015	Undertaking	Roy Maynard	Short film
2016	War Dogs	Hillsdale Home Mgr	
2017	Amelia 2.0	Max Parker	
2022	For Prophet	Mayor Kevin Owens	
2022	Nope	Buster	

=== Television ===
Year	Title	Role	Notes
1996	Early Edition	Bystander	1 episode
2002	The Guardian	Mall Lawyer	1 episode
2002	Six Feet Under	Casket Salesman	1 episode
2002, 2004, 2010	CSI: Crime Scene Investigation	Vincent / Mr. Dorsey / Craig Lifford	3 episodes
2003	Strong Medicine	Walter Shenckman	1 episode
2003, 2011	CSI: Miami	Parker Boyd / Arnold Wilkins	2 episodes
2004	Judging Amy	Colton Gerard	1 episode
2005	ER	Lysander Martin	1 episode
2006	The Closer	Elvis Presley	1 episode
2006, 2018	NCIS	Terry Spooner	2 episodes
2009	Medium	Willem Wittmar	1 episode
2009	Criminal Minds	Ray Campion	1 episode
2009–2011	Hung	Ronnie Haxon	Main role, 21 episodes
2010	Justified	Stan Perkins	1 episode
2012–2013	Franklin & Bash	Robbie Ambriano	2 episodes
2013	Grey's Anatomy	Stan Grossberg	2 episodes
2013	Behind the Candelabra	Assistant Director	Television film
2013	Crossing Lines	Gerald Wilhoit	2 episodes
2015	Newsreaders	Fitz Bagley	1 episode
2015	Rizzoli & Isles	Elliot Dutton	1 episode
2015	Masters of Sex	Hand Massager Salesman	1 episode
2015–2019	iZombie	Stacey Boss	Recurring role, 19 episodes
2017	Legion	The Greek	2 episodes
2017–2018	Chicago Med	Stanley Stohl	Recurring role, 12 episodes
2023	Magnum P.I.	Nolan Pierce	1 episode
2023	Goosebumps	Ephraim Biddle	1 episode
2024	9-1-1	Ship Doctor	2 episodes

=== Theatre ===
Month/Year	Venue	Title	Role	Notes
July 1987	Tulane Center Stage (New Orleans, LA)	Loot by Joe Orton	Hal	
September 1988	Northlight Theatre (Evanston, IL)	Talking to Myself by Studs Terkel	Stud Terkel	
October 1989	Northlight Theatre	The Butter and Egg Man by George S. Kaufman	"a Big Apple newcomer"	Chicago Sun Times review
November 1989	Goodman Theatre (Chicago)	A Christmas Carol		
September 1990	Victory Gardens Theater	T Bone N Weasel by Jon Klein	Weasel	
February 1991	Wisdom Bridge Theatre (Chicago)	Only Kidding by Jim Georghan	Jerry Goldstein	
September 2000	Chicago Shakespeare Theater	The Two Gentlemen of Verona	Proteus	
	National Jewish Theatre	Wizards of Quiz		
2017	Looking Glass Theatre	Life Sucks		
2019	Brooks Atkinson Theatre (New York, NY)	Waitress	Ogie	Reprising his role in the film version

=== Awards and nominations ===
Year	Award	Category	Nominated work	Result
2002	MTV Movie & TV Awards	Best On-Screen Team	Ocean's Eleven	Nominated
2007	Teen Choice Awards	Choice Movie Chemistry	Ocean's Thirteen	Nominated
2013	New Orleans Film Festival	Best Narrative Feature	King of Herrings	Won
2013	New Orleans Film Festival	Best Louisiana Narrative Feature	King of Herrings	Nominated
2013	Louisville International Festival of Film	Best Feature	King of Herrings	Nominated
2014	Phoenix Film Festival	Best Picture – Feature Film	King of Herrings	Nominated
2014	Phoenix Film Festival	Dan Harkins Breakthrough Filmmaker Award	King of Herrings	Won
2014	Gwinnett Center International Film Festival	Best Actor	Coffee, Kill Boss	Won
2022	Faith in Film – Film Festival	Best Ensemble Cast (shared with the cast)	For Prophet	Won
2022	Canadian International Faith & Family Film Festival	Best Supporting Actor	For Prophet	Nominated
