= Qin Shaobo =

Chinese actor, acrobat and contortionist

Shaobo Qin
- Born: 1982 (age 42–43); Guangxi, China

Qin Shaobo (Chinese: 秦少波) (b. 1982 in Guangxi) is a Chinese actor, acrobat and contortionist. His first performance took place when he was 11 years old which resulted in him wanting to make acting a career.

Qin's motion picture debut was in 2001, playing The Amazing Yen, Danny Ocean's "grease man", in the remake of Ocean's Eleven. He reprised the role in 2004 in Ocean's Twelve and again in the sequel Ocean's Thirteen. He returned to the role in the spin-off film Ocean's 8.

== Filmography ==
Year	Title	Role
2001	Ocean's Eleven	Yen
2004	Ocean's Twelve	Yen
2007	Ocean's Thirteen	Yen
2018	Ocean's 8	Yen
