= Michael DeLano =

American actor (1940–2025)

- Born: November 26, 1940; Norfolk, VA, U.S.
- Died: October 20, 2025 (aged 84); Las Vegas, Nevada, U.S.
- Other name: Key Larson
- Years active: 1970–2013

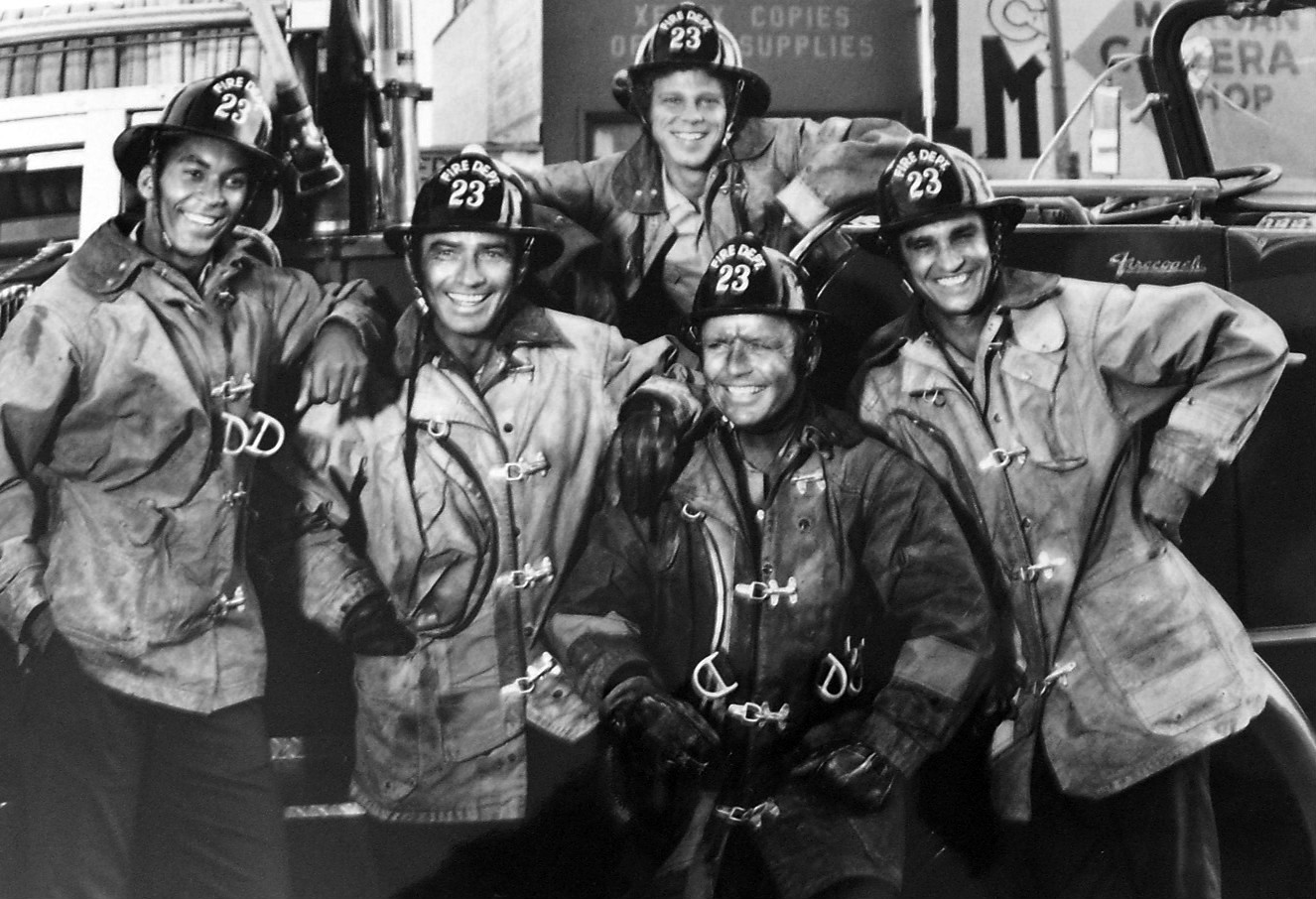
Cast of Firehouse (1974), from left: Bill Overton, James Drury, Brad David (in back), Richard Jaeckel (in front), Delano (1974)

Michael DeLano (November 26, 1940 – October 20, 2025) was an American actor who is best known for portraying the casino manager in the films Ocean's Eleven (2001) and Ocean's Twelve (2004). He was also a singer, performing as Key Larson.

== Acting career ==
On television, DeLano played Sonny Capito in 13 episodes of Firehouse (1974) and Lou Atkins in five episodes of Supertrain (1979). He appeared in three episodes of Kojak; and also portrayed Dr. Mark Dante in General Hospital (1976), Reverend Sung in Soap (1979) and he is known for his short role as Forrestal in the 1985 movie Commando. DeLano also appeared in the recurring role of Johnny Venture, in 11 episodes of Rhoda from 1976 to 1978. He was in the season three, episode five of Wonder Woman as the character Nick Moreno. He was also a guest star in a season four episode of Perfect Strangers as Chuck Panama (Episode: Piano Movers). Earlier in his career, DeLano appeared in Barnaby Jones, in the episode titled, "Sing a Song of Murder" (04/01/1973). He was Frank Coyne in four episodes (1980–81), including the pilot, of the prime time soap opera Flamingo Road. In the mid 1980s he appeared in three episodes each of The A-Team and Hill Street Blues.

DeLano acted in the films Catlow and The New Centurions. On stage, DeLano starred as Berger in a Chicago production of Hair until an injury caused him to leave after two months.

== Music career ==
In 1960, as Key Larson, he signed with Swan Records. While under contract to Swan, he recorded "A Web of Lies" and "A Little Lovin' Goes a Long, Long Way" and appeared on American Bandstand.

== Death ==
DeLano died on October 20, 2025, at the age of 84 from a heart attack at a Las Vegas hospital.
