= Gary Ross =

American director and screenwriter (born 1956)

- Born: November 3, 1956 (age 69); Los Angeles, California, U.S.
- Occupations: Screenwriter; director; producer
- Years active: 1986–present
- Spouse: Claudia Solti
- Children: 2
- Father: Arthur A. Ross

Gary Ross (born November 3, 1956) is an American screenwriter, director, and producer. He is best known for writing and directing the fantasy comedy-drama film Pleasantville (1998), the sports drama film Seabiscuit (2003), the dystopian action film The Hunger Games (2012), and the heist comedy film Ocean's 8 (2018). Ross has been nominated for four Academy Awards.

== Early life and education ==
Gary Ross was born on November 3, 1956, in Los Angeles, California, the son of Gail and Arthur A. Ross, an Oscar-nominated screenwriter (Brubaker). His family is Jewish.

He attended (though did not graduate from) the University of Pennsylvania.

== Career ==
Ross worked as a fisherman, worked on Ted Kennedy's 1980 Presidential campaign, consulted on both Michael Dukakis 1988 presidential campaign's and Bill Clinton's presidential campaigns, and wrote a novel before being hired to write screenplays for Paramount Pictures.

Big was his first produced screenplay. Co-written with Anne Spielberg (sister of Steven), it led to an Academy Award nomination and a Writers Guild of America Award. He went on to write several other successful films, including Dave in 1993. In 1998, he wrote and directed Pleasantville, and in 2003, he wrote, directed and produced Seabiscuit, based on Seabiscuit: An American Legend by Laura Hillenbrand. The film earned seven Academy Award nominations.

Ross took on the high-profile project of co-adapting and directing the film adaptation of the first book in Suzanne Collins's Hunger Games trilogy. The film was released on March 23, 2012, and earned $672.8 million worldwide. Although the film was financially and critically successful, Ross opted to not adapt or direct the sequels, citing the rushed production schedule (particularly for both writing and directing) as his main reason.

Ross also wrote and produced the animated feature The Tale of Despereaux, based on the Newbery Medal-winning children's book by Kate DiCamillo. His first book, Bartholomew Biddle and the Very Big Wind, was published by Candlewick Press in 2012. A children's book, it is written completely in verse.

His next two films as a director and writer were the period drama Free State of Jones (2016) and the heist film Ocean's 8 (2018).

== Filmography ==
Year	Title	Director	Writer	Producer
1988	Big	No	Yes	Co-producer
1992	Mr. Baseball	No	Yes	No
1993	Dave	No	Yes	No
1994	Lassie	No	Yes	No
1997	Trial and Error	No	No	Yes
1998	Pleasantville	Yes	Yes	Yes
2003	Seabiscuit	Yes	Yes	Yes
2008	The Tale of Despereaux	No	Yes	Yes
2012	The Hunger Games	Yes	Yes	No
2016	Free State of Jones	Yes	Yes	Yes
2018	Ocean's 8	Yes	Yes	No

Teleplay

- The Hitchhiker (1986) (Episode "Man of Her Dreams")

Uncredited rewrite

- Desert Warrior (2025)

Executive producer

- The Misery Brothers (1995)
- Untitled Ocean's Eleven prequel (2027)

Acting roles

Year	Title	Role
1993	Dave	Policeman #2
1995	The Misery Brothers	Redwood Stump
2003	Seabiscuit	Pimlico Track Announcer

== Awards and nominations ==
Year	Title	Award
1988	Big	Saturn Award for Best Writing; Nominated- Academy Award for Best Original Screenplay; Nominated- Writers Guild of America Award for Best Original Screenplay
1993	Dave	Paul Selvin Award; Nominated- Academy Award for Best Original Screenplay; Nominated- Writers Guild of America Award for Best Original Screenplay
1998	Pleasantville	Satellite Award for Best Original Screenplay; Producers Guild of America for Most Promising Producer; Nominated- Satellite Award for Best Film – Musical or Comedy; Nominated- Satellite Award for Best Director; Nominated- Saturn Award for Best Writing
2003	Seabiscuit	USC Scripter Award; Nominated- Academy Award for Best Picture; Nominated- Academy Award for Best Adapted Screenplay; Nominated- Broadcast Film Critics Association Award for Best Screenplay; Nominated- Directors Guild of America Award for Outstanding Directing; Nominated- Producers Guild of America Award for Best Theatrical Motion Picture; Nominated- Writers Guild of America Award for Best Adapted Screenplay; Nominated- Satellite Award for Best Adapted Screenplay
