= Brad Pitt filmography =

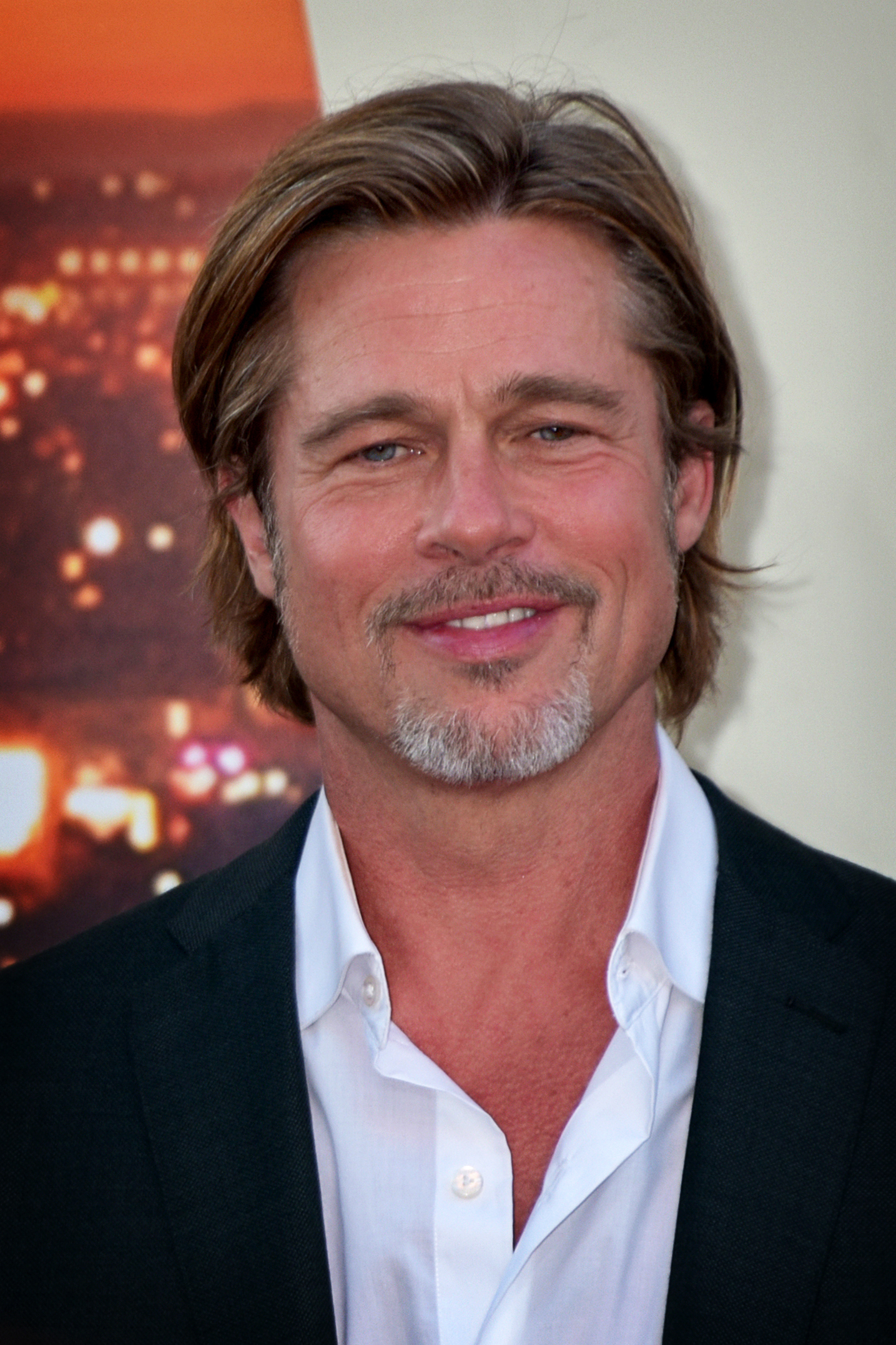
- Pitt at the premiere of Once Upon A Time In Hollywood in 2019
- Film: 61
- Television series: 18
- Theatre: 1
- Others: 1 video game

Brad Pitt is an American actor and film producer. His acting career began at age 23 in 1987 with roles in the hit Fox television series 21 Jump Street. He subsequently appeared in episodes for television shows during the late 1980s and played his first major role in The Dark Side of the Sun (1988) the slasher film Cutting Class (1989). He gained recognition in Thelma & Louise (1991), A River Runs Through It (1992), Cool World (1992) and Kalifornia (1993).

He later took on the role of vampire Louis de Pointe du Lac in the horror drama Interview with the Vampire (1994) and for his performance in the epic drama Legends of the Fall (1994), he earned his first Golden Globe Award for Best Actor nomination.

Pitt starred in the David Fincher-directed, commercially successful thriller Seven (1995), in which he played a detective on the trail of a serial killer who murders people he believes are guilty of the seven deadly sins. His performance as a psychotic mental patient in the science fiction film 12 Monkeys won him the Golden Globe Award for Best Supporting Actor and an Academy Award nomination in the same category. He followed it with the role of Heinrich Harrer in the biopic Seven Years in Tibet (1997) and as Death in Meet Joe Black (1998). Pitt reteamed with Fincher to star in the apocalyptic film Fight Club (1999) as anti-consumerist cult leader Tyler Durden, a role that required him to learn boxing, taekwondo, and grappling. A critical and commercial disappointment at the time of release, the film has since developed a cult status. Pitt portrayed Rusty Ryan in the commercially successful heist film series Ocean's Trilogy (2001–07). In 2002, he earned a Primetime Emmy Award nomination for his guest appearance in the sitcom Friends alongside his then-wife Jennifer Aniston. Also that year, Pitt started a production company, Plan B Entertainment, whose first release was the epic war film Troy (2004), starring Pitt. He played an assassin opposite Angelina Jolie in the commercially successful action comedy Mr. & Mrs. Smith (2005).

In 2006, Pitt produced the crime drama The Departed and starred alongside Cate Blanchett in the multi-narrative drama Babel; the former won the Academy Award for Best Picture. Pitt's portrayal of the eponymous man who ages in reverse in the drama The Curious Case of Benjamin Button (2008) earned him an Academy Award for Best Actor nomination. He starred in the successful war film Inglourious Basterds (2009), and produced the superhero film Kick-Ass (2010) and its sequel in 2013. In 2011, he earned critical acclaim for producing and starring in two films—the experimental drama The Tree of Life and the biopic sports drama Moneyball—both of which were nominated for the Academy Award for Best Picture. He also garnered a Best Actor nomination for the latter. His biggest commercial success as a leading actor for many years was the apocalyptic film World War Z (2013), which grossed $540 million worldwide. That was only eclipsed by the Apple Studios produced film F1 in 2025. Pitt produced the period drama 12 Years a Slave (2013), for which he won the Academy Award for Best Picture. In 2014, he starred in the war film Fury which received positive reviews from critics and proved to be successful at the box office. For playing a stunt double to Leonardo DiCaprio's character in Quentin Tarantino's film Once Upon a Time in Hollywood (2019), he won an Academy Award, a Golden Globe Award, and a BAFTA Award for Best Actor in a Supporting Role.

== Film ==
Year	Title	Credited as		Role	Notes	Ref.
Year	Title	Actor	Producer	Role	Notes	Ref.
1987	Hunk	Yes	No	Man at beach with drink	Uncredited	
1987	No Man's Land	Yes	No	Waiter	Uncredited	
1987	Less than Zero	Yes	No	Partygoer/Preppie guy at fight	Uncredited	
1987	No Way Out	Yes	No	Party guest	Uncredited	
1988	A Stoning in Fulham County	Yes	No	Teddy Johnson		
1988	The Dark Side of the Sun	Yes	No	Rick		
1989	Happy Together	Yes	No	Brian		
1989	Cutting Class	Yes	No	Dwight Ingalls		
1991	Across the Tracks	Yes	No	Joe Maloney		
1991	Thelma & Louise	Yes	No	J.D.		
1991	Johnny Suede	Yes	No	Johnny Suede		
1992	Cool World	Yes	No	Frank Harris		
1992	Contact	Yes	No	Cox	Short film	
1992	A River Runs Through It	Yes	No	Paul Maclean		
1993	Kalifornia	Yes	No	Early Grayce		
1993	True Romance	Yes	No	Floyd		
1994	The Favor	Yes	No	Elliott Fowler		
1994	Interview with the Vampire	Yes	No	Louis de Pointe du Lac		
1994	Legends of the Fall	Yes	No	Tristan Ludlow		
1995	Seven	Yes	No	David Mills		
1995	12 Monkeys	Yes	No	Jeffrey Goines		
1996	Sleepers	Yes	No	Michael Sullivan		
1997	The Devil's Own	Yes	No	Rory Devaney (Francis Austin McQuire)		
1997	Seven Years in Tibet	Yes	No	Heinrich Harrer		
1998	Meet Joe Black	Yes	No	Young Man in Coffee Shop/Death as "Joe Black"		
1999	Being John Malkovich	Yes	No	Miffed Star	Cameo	
1999	Fight Club	Yes	No	Tyler Durden		
2000	Snatch	Yes	No	Mickey O'Neil		
2001	The Mexican	Yes	No	Jerry Welbach		
2001	Spy Game	Yes	No	Tom Bishop		
2001	Ocean's Eleven	Yes	No	Rusty Ryan		
2002	Full Frontal	Yes	No	Himself	Cameo	
2002	Confessions of a Dangerous Mind	Yes	No	Bachelor Brad	Cameo	
2003	Sinbad: Legend of the Seven Seas	Yes	No	Sinbad (voice)		
2003	Abby Singer	Yes	No	Himself	Cameo	
2004	Troy	Yes	No	Achilles		
2004	Ocean's Twelve	Yes	No	Rusty Ryan		
2005	Mr. & Mrs. Smith	Yes	No	John Smith		
2006	God Grew Tired of Us	No	Executive	—N/a		
2006	The Departed	No	Yes	—N/a		
2006	Running with Scissors	No	Yes	—N/a		
2006	Babel	Yes	No	Richard Jones		
2007	The Tehuacan Project	No	Executive	—N/a	Short film	
2007	Year of the Dog	No	Executive	—N/a		
2007	A Mighty Heart	No	Yes	—N/a		
2007	Ocean's Thirteen	Yes	No	Rusty Ryan		
2007	The Assassination of Jesse James by the Coward Robert Ford	Yes	Yes	Jesse James		
2008	Burn After Reading	Yes	No	Chad Feldheimer		
2008	The Curious Case of Benjamin Button	Yes	No	Benjamin Button		
2009	Inglourious Basterds	Yes	No	Lt. Aldo Raine		
2009	Beyond All Boundaries	Yes	No	Sgt. Bill Mauldin	Voice; Documentary	
2009	The Time Traveler's Wife	No	Executive	—N/a		
2009	The Private Lives of Pippa Lee	No	Executive	—N/a		
2010	Megamind	Yes	No	Metro Man (voice)		
2010	Kick-Ass	No	Yes	—N/a		
2010	Eat Pray Love	No	Executive	—N/a		
2011	The Tree of Life	Yes	Yes	O'Brien		
2011	Moneyball	Yes	Yes	Billy Beane		
2011	Happy Feet Two	Yes	No	Will the Krill (voice)		
2012	Killing Them Softly	Yes	Yes	Jackie Cogan		
2013	World War Z	Yes	Yes	Gerry Lane		
2013	Kick-Ass 2	No	Yes	—N/a		
2013	12 Years a Slave	Yes	Yes	Samuel Bass		
2013	The Counselor	Yes	No	Westray		
2014	Big Men	No	Executive	—N/a	Documentary	
2014	Fury	Yes	Executive	Sergeant Don 'Wardaddy' Collier		
2014	Selma	No	Executive	—N/a		
2015	True Story	No	Executive	—N/a		
2015	The Audition	Yes	No	Himself	Short film	
2015	By the Sea	Yes	Yes	Roland		
2015	Hitting the Apex	Yes	Yes	Narrator	Documentary	
2015	The Big Short	Yes	Yes	Ben Rickert		
2016	Moonlight	No	Executive	—N/a		
2016	Voyage of Time	Yes	Yes	Narrator (voice)	Documentary	
2016	Allied	Yes	No	Max Vatan		
2016	The Lost City of Z	No	Executive	—N/a		
2017	Okja	No	Executive	—N/a		
2017	War Machine	Yes	Yes	General Glen McMahon		
2017	Brad's Status	No	Executive	—N/a		
2018	Deadpool 2	Yes	No	Vanisher	Cameo	
2018	Beautiful Boy	No	Yes	—N/a		
2018	If Beale Street Could Talk	No	Executive	—N/a		
2018	Vice	No	Yes	—N/a		
2019	The Last Black Man in San Francisco	No	Executive	—N/a		
2019	Once Upon a Time in Hollywood	Yes	No	Cliff Booth		
2019	The King	No	Yes	—N/a		
2019	Ad Astra	Yes	Yes	Major Roy McBride		
2020	Kajillionaire	No	Executive	—N/a		
2020	Minari	No	Executive	—N/a		
2020	Irresistible	No	Executive	—N/a		
2022	The Lost City	Yes	No	Jack Trainer		
2022	Father of the Bride	No	Executive	—N/a		
2022	Bullet Train	Yes	No	Ladybug		
2022	She Said	No	Executive	—N/a		
2022	Women Talking	No	Executive	—N/a		
2022	Blonde	No	Yes	—N/a		
2022	Babylon	Yes	No	Jack Conrad		
2023	Landscape with Invisible Hand	No	Executive	—N/a		
2024	Bob Marley: One Love	No	Executive	—N/a		
2024	IF	Yes	No	Keith (voice)	Credit only	
2024	Apocalypse in the Tropics	No	Executive	—N/a	Documentary	
2024	One to One: John & Yoko	No	Executive	—N/a	Documentary	
2024	Beetlejuice Beetlejuice	No	Executive	—N/a		
2024	Wolfs	Yes	Yes	Pam's Man		
2024	Nickel Boys	No	Executive	—N/a		
2024	The Trainer	Yes	No	Himself	Documentary	
2025	It's Never Over, Jeff Buckley	No	Executive	—N/a	Documentary	
2025	Mickey 17	No	Executive	—N/a		
2025	Olmo	No	Executive	—N/a		
2025	Bono: Stories of Surrender	No	Yes	—N/a	Documentary	
2025	F1	Yes	Yes	Sonny Hayes		
2025	H Is for Hawk	No	Executive	—N/a		
2025	Cover-Up	No	Executive	—N/a	Documentary	
2025	The Voice of Hind Rajab	No	Executive	—N/a		
2025	Hedda	No	Executive	—N/a		
2025	Anemone	No	Executive	—N/a		
2026	Teenage Sex and Death at Camp Miasma	No	Executive	—N/a		
2026	Jackass: Best and Last	Yes	No	Himself	Archival footage	
2026	Heart of the Beast	Yes	Yes	James Belmont		
2026	The Further Mis-Adventures of Cliff Booth	Yes	Yes	Cliff Booth		
TBA	The Riders †	Yes	Yes	Fred Scully	Filming	
TBA	The Chaperones †	No	Yes	—N/a	Post-production	
TBA	Isle of Man †	No	Yes	—N/a	Filming	

== Television ==
Year	Title	Credited as		Role	Notes	Ref.
Year	Title	Actor	Executive producer	Role	Notes	Ref.
1987	Another World	Yes	No	Chris	2 episodes	
1987	Growing Pains	Yes	No	Jeff & Johnathan Keith	2 episodes	
1987	Head of the Class	Yes	No	Chuck	Episode: "Partners"	
1987	Freddy's Nightmares	Yes	No	Rick Austin	Episode: "Black Tickets"	
1987	Dallas	Yes	No	Randy	4 episodes	
1988	Trial and Error	Yes	No	The Bellboy	Episode: "Bon Appetit"	
1988	A Stoning in Fulham County	Yes	No	Teddy	Television film	
1988	21 Jump Street	Yes	No	Peter	Episode: "Best Years of Your Life"	
1990	The Image	Yes	No	Cameraman	Television film	
1990	Too Young to Die?	Yes	No	Billy Canton	Television film	
1990	Glory Days	Yes	No	Walker Lovejoy	6 episodes	
1992	Two-Fisted Tales	Yes	No	Billy	Segment: "King of the Road"	
1992	Tales from the Crypt	Yes	No	Billy	Episode: "King of the Road"	
1998	Saturday Night Live	Yes	No	Himself	Episode: "David Spade/Eagle-Eye Cherry"	
2001	Friends	Yes	No	Will Colbert	Episode: "The One with the Rumor"	
2002	Jackass	Yes	No	Himself	2 episodes	
2003	King of the Hill	Yes	No	Patch Boomhauer (voice)	Episode: "Patch Boomhauer"	
2008	Pretty/Handsome	No	Yes	—N/a		
2011	His Way	Yes	No	Himself	Documentary	
2014	Resurrection	No	Yes	—N/a	Episode: "The Returned"	
2014	The Normal Heart	No	Yes	—N/a		
2014	Nightingale	No	Yes	—N/a		
2016–2019	The OA	No	Yes	—N/a		
2017–2018	The Jim Jefferies Show	Yes	No	Weatherman	7 episodes; cameo	
2018–2019	Sweetbitter	No	Yes	—N/a		
2020–present	Lego Masters	No	Yes	—N/a		
2020	The Third Day	No	Yes	—N/a	Episode: "Friday — The Father"	
2020	Celebrity IOU	No	No	Himself	Episode: "Brad Pitt's Gifting a Backyard Pad"	
2020	Saturday Night Live	Yes	No	Dr. Anthony Fauci	Episode: "Miley Cyrus"	
2021	The Underground Railroad	No	Yes	—N/a	10 episodes	
2022	High School	No	Yes	—N/a		
2022–2024	Outer Range	No	Yes	—N/a		
2023	Dave	Yes	No	Luke Bradley "Brad" Pitt	Episode: "Looking for Love"	
2024–present	3 Body Problem	No	Yes	—N/a		
2025	Adolescence	No	Yes	—N/a	4 episodes	

== Theatre ==
Year	Title	Role	Venue	Notes	Ref.
2012	8	Vaughn R. Walker	Wilshire Ebell Theatre	Single performance	

== Video games ==
Year	Title	Role	Notes	Ref.
2025	F1 25	Sonny Hayes	Downloadable content; Likeness only	

== See also ==
- List of awards and nominations received by Brad Pitt
