= What Would Tyler Durden Do? =

Defunct gossip blog

- Website type: Blog
- Owner: SK Intertainment
- Website: http://www.wwtdd.com/
- Current status: Online (2024)

What Would Tyler Durden Do? (WWTDD) is a gossip blog named for the Fight Club character Tyler Durden. The wording played on the Christian inspirational phrase 'What would Jesus do?' The blog, which published material that was not safe for work, published rumors, criticism and revealing photographs of celebrities. The posts to the blog typically consisted of a report followed by commentary from the author. Its readership was primarily from the United States. In a 2006 Youth Trends survey, What Would Tyler Durden Do? was one of two blogs of the top 10 most popular websites with females aged 17–25, a popularity the researcher attributed to "Gen Y females' current adoration with content surrounding celebrities and their 'uh oh' moments." It was cited by Mashable in 2008 as one of the 30 most salacious celebrity gossip sites on the Internet. The blog explains its purpose as follows:

"What Would Tyler Durden Do" is a blog focused on bringing you the latest gossip and news about rich and famous celebrities. And then making fun of them. Why? Because fuck them, that's why.

— What Would Tyler Durden Do?

In 2008, the site was owned by Buzznet, Inc.

An author, known by the online name "Brendon", edited the site until his dismissal in 2012. Since 2012, the site was written and edited by satirist, Lex Jurgen. By 2014, the site had grown to three million monthly readers. Citing differences of opinion with ownership on what was funny, Jurgen announced his departure in January 2018 for new professional pursuits. Little is known of the current staff following Jurgen's resignation.
