= Yalda T. Uhls =

American developmental psychologist and former film executive

- Education: University of California, Berkeley (BA); UCLA Anderson School of Management (MBA); University of California, Los Angeles (PhD)
- Occupations: Developmental psychologist; Researcher; Author
- Known for: Research on media's effects on adolescents; Founder of the Center for Scholars & Storytellers
- Spouse: Jim Uhls
- Parent: Mina J. Bissell
- Website: www.scholarsandstorytellers.com

Yalda T. Uhls is an American developmental psychologist, researcher, author, and the founder of the UCLA-based Center for Scholars & Storytellers. Her work focuses on the effects of media on adolescents. Before her academic career, she was a senior executive at major film studios, including MGM and Sony.

== Early life and education ==
Uhls is the American-born daughter of Iranian immigrants. She earned a Bachelor of Arts degree from the University of California, Berkeley. She later attended the UCLA Anderson School of Management, where she received her MBA. After a career in the entertainment industry, Uhls returned to UCLA and earned a Ph.D. in Developmental Psychology. Her doctoral dissertation was awarded the Outstanding Doctoral Dissertation award by the Society for Research in Child Development.

== Career ==
=== Entertainment industry ===
Uhls began her career in the film industry, working for nearly two decades as a senior executive. She held positions at MGM and Sony, where she supervised the development and production of numerous films.

=== Academia and research ===
After becoming a parent, Uhls transitioned her career to academia to study child development. She is currently an assistant adjunct professor in the Department of Psychology at UCLA, where she teaches a course on digital media and human development.

Her research examines how media and technology impact the social and emotional development of young people. A notable study she co-authored, published in Computers in Human Behavior, found that preteens who spent five days at an outdoor camp without screens showed improved skills in reading nonverbal emotional cues compared to a control group. Her work has been featured in publications such as The New York Times, Time, and on NPR.

=== Center for Scholars & Storytellers ===
Uhls founded the Center for Scholars & Storytellers at UCLA, a research organization that aims to bridge the gap between academic research on child development and media content creation. The center works with entertainment industry professionals to help create more authentic and inclusive stories for young audiences.

== Advisory roles ==
Uhls serves on several advisory boards, including the YouTube Kids and Family Advisory Council, the NAACP Entertainment Advisory Council, and Common Sense Media's LA Advisory Council.

== Publications ==
Uhls is the author of the book Media Moms & Digital Dads: A Fact-Not-Fear Approach to Parenting in the Digital Age, published in 2015.

=== Selected works ===
- Uhls, Y. T. (2015). Media Moms & Digital Dads: A Fact-Not-Fear Approach to Parenting in the Digital Age. Taylor and Francis.
- Uhls, Y. T., Ellison, N. B., & Subrahmanyam, K. (2017). Benefits and Costs of Social Media in Adolescence. Pediatrics.
- Uhls, Y. T., Michikyan, M., Morris, J., Garcia, D., Small, G. W., Zgourou, E., & Greenfield, P. M. (2014). Five days at outdoor education camp without screens improves preteen skills with nonverbal emotion cues. Computers in Human Behavior.

== Personal life ==
Uhls is married to screenwriter Jim Uhls. Her mother is the biologist Mina J. Bissell.
