= Jim Uhls =

American screenwriter

- Born: March 25, 1957 (age 69); Missouri, U.S.
- Education: Drake University (BFA); UCLA School of Theater, Film and Television (MFA)
- Occupations: Screenwriter, script doctor
- Spouse: Yalda T. Uhls
- Writing career
- Notable work: Fight Club (1999)

James Uhls (born March 25, 1957) is an American screenwriter, best known for writing the screenplay for the film Fight Club (1999), directed by David Fincher. His other major credits include the science fiction film Jumper (2008) and the television film Semper Fi.

== Early life and education ==
Uhls graduated from Drake University in 1979 with a Bachelor of Fine Arts (BFA) degree in theatre. Following his undergraduate studies, he attended the UCLA School of Theater, Film and Television, where he earned a Master of Fine Arts (MFA) in its screenwriting program.

== Career ==
=== Fight Club ===
Uhls's breakthrough came when he was hired to adapt Chuck Palahniuk's novel Fight Club for the screen. The adaptation process was extensive; Uhls worked closely with Fincher for over a year to translate the novel's complex, non-linear narrative and internal monologue into a workable script. One of the most significant changes from the novel was the introduction of a new, more cinematic ending, a decision made with the blessing of Palahniuk. Upon its release, Fight Club was met with a polarized critical reception but has since become a widely acclaimed cult classic.

=== Later work ===
Following the success of Fight Club, Uhls co-wrote the screenplay for the science fiction action film Jumper (2008), directed by Doug Liman and starring Hayden Christensen. Uhls also developed, wrote, and executive produced Semper Fi, a drama series for Fox.

Uhls has also been attached to several high-profile projects, including an adaptation of the pulp novel series The Destroyer for director Shane Black and Sony Pictures.

=== Teaching ===
In addition to his screenwriting work, Uhls frequently serves as a guest lecturer and instructor. He has taught at his alma mater, UCLA, as well as for the Austin Film Festival.

== Personal life ==
Uhls is married to Dr. Yalda T. Uhls, an author and researcher in child psychology and media at UCLA.

== Filmography ==
Film

- Fight Club (1999)
- Semper Fi (2001) (Television pilot)
- The Scorned (film) (2005) (Television film)
- Jumper (2008) (Co-writer)
