= Fight Club (novel) =

1996 novel by Chuck Palahniuk

- First edition cover
- Author: Chuck Palahniuk
- Cover artist: Michael Ian Kaye; Melissa Hayden; Proverbial Inc.
- Language: English
- Genre: Postmodernism, satire
- Publisher: W. W. Norton
- Publication date: August 17, 1996
- Publication place: United States
- Media type: Print (Hardcover)
- Pages: 208
- ISBN: 0-393-03976-5
- OCLC: 33440073
- Dewey Decimal: 813/.54 20
- LC Class: PS3566.A4554 F54 1996

Fight Club is a 1996 satirical novel by Chuck Palahniuk. It was Palahniuk's first published novel, and follows the experiences of an unnamed protagonist struggling with insomnia. The protagonist finds relief by impersonating a seriously ill person in several support groups, after his doctor remarks that insomnia is not "real suffering" and that he should find out what it is really like to suffer. The protagonist then meets a mysterious man named Tyler Durden and establishes an underground fighting club as radical psychotherapy.

In 1999, director David Fincher adapted the novel into a film of the same name, starring Brad Pitt and Edward Norton. Despite underperforming financially, the film acquired a cult following; it also heightened the profile of the novel.

== Plot ==
An anonymous narrator works as a product recall specialist for a car company. Due to the stress of his job and the jet lag brought upon by frequent business trips, he begins to have recurring insomnia. When he seeks treatment, his doctor advises him to visit a support group for testicular cancer victims to "see what real suffering is like". He finds that sharing the problems of others—despite not having testicular cancer himself—alleviates his insomnia.

The treatment works until he meets Marla Singer, another "tourist" visiting the support group under false pretenses. The disturbed Marla reminds the narrator that he is a faker who does not belong there. He begins to hate Marla for keeping him from crying, and, therefore, from sleeping. After a confrontation, the two agree to attend separate support group meetings to avoid each other. The truce is uneasy, and the narrator's insomnia returns.

During a business trip, the narrator recalls meeting a strange man named Tyler Durden while on a nude beach; however, in another version of events, he first encounters Tyler as a seatmate on a plane. After an explosion destroys the narrator's condominium, he asks to stay at Tyler's house. Tyler agrees, but asks for something in return: "I want you to hit me as hard as you can." Both men find that they enjoy the ensuing fistfight. They move in together and establish a "fight club", drawing men with similar temperaments into bare-knuckle fighting matches, set to eight rules:

1. You don't talk about fight club.
2. You don't talk about fight club.
3. When someone says stop, or taps out, or goes limp, the fight is over. (Note: Shortly after the third rule is introduced, it is dropped from the club and the other rules move up one numbered position. It is mentioned by the Narrator the first time he states the rules, but it is not mentioned by Tyler when he states them. Tyler also adds the eighth rule, which becomes the seventh rule in his version of the rule set. (Palahniuk, Fight Club, 1999, pp. 49–50.))
4. Only two guys to a fight.
5. One fight at a time.
6. They fight without shirts or shoes.
7. The fights go on as long as they have to.
8. If this is your first night at fight club, you have to fight.

—

A mechanic later tells the narrator about two new rules: nobody is the center of the fight club except for the two men fighting, and the fight club will always be free.

Marla, noticing that the narrator has not recently attended his support groups, calls him saying that she has overdosed on Xanax in a half-hearted suicide attempt. Tyler returns from work, picks up the phone to Marla's drug-induced rambling, and rescues her. Tyler and Marla embark on an affair that confounds the narrator and confuses Marla. Throughout this affair, Marla is unaware both of fight club's existence and the interaction between Tyler and the narrator. As Tyler and Marla are never seen at the same time, the narrator wonders whether Tyler and Marla are the same person.

As fight club attains a nationwide presence, Tyler uses it to spread his anti-consumerist ideas, recruiting members to participate in increasingly elaborate pranks on corporate America. He eventually gathers the most devoted fight club members and forms "Project Mayhem", a cult-like organization that trains itself to bring down modern civilization. This organization, like fight club, is controlled by a set of rules:

1. You don't ask questions.
2. You don't ask questions.
3. No excuses.
4. No lies.
5. You have to trust Tyler.

While initially a loyal participant in Project Mayhem, the narrator becomes uncomfortable with the increasing destructiveness of its activities. He resolves to stop Tyler and his followers when Bob, a friend from the testicular cancer support group, is killed during one of the sabotage operations.

One day, Marla inadvertently reveals to the narrator that he and Tyler are the same person: as his mental state deteriorated, the narrator's mind formed a new personality that could escape from his life's problems. Tyler's affair with Marla—whom the narrator professes to dislike—was the narrator's own affair with Marla. The narrator's bouts of insomnia had been Tyler's personality surfacing; Tyler was active whenever the narrator was "sleeping". The Tyler personality created fight club and blew up the Narrator's condo.

Tyler plans to blow up a skyscraper using homemade bombs created by Project Mayhem; the target of the explosion is the nearby national museum. Tyler plans to die as a martyr during this event, taking the narrator's life as well. Realizing this, the narrator sets out to stop Tyler. The narrator makes his way to the roof of the building, where Tyler holds him at gunpoint. When Marla comes to the roof with one of the support groups, Tyler vanishes, as Tyler "was his hallucination, not hers".

With Tyler gone, the narrator waits for the bomb to explode and kill him. The bomb malfunctions because Tyler mixed paraffin into the explosives. Still alive and holding Tyler's gun, the narrator puts the gun in his mouth and shoots himself. Some time later, he awakens in a mental hospital, believing he is in Heaven, and imagines an argument with God over human nature. The narrator is then approached by hospital employees who reveal themselves to be Project members. They tell him their plans still continue, and that they are expecting Tyler to return.

== History ==
Palahniuk once had an altercation while camping; though he returned to work bruised and swollen, his co-workers avoided asking him what had happened on the camping trip. Their reluctance to know what happened in his private life inspired him to write Fight Club. He has also spoken about getting into a fight with his coworker Jimmy at Freightliner Trucks. He said:

We fought and fought. Everybody on the assembly line cheered. When it was over we all just went back to work. I realized in that moment we'd expressed this horrible misery that everybody had been feeling that day. After that Jimmy was my best friend, and I couldn't get rid of him. Since then I've been fascinated by the dynamic of that day.

In 1995, Palahniuk joined a Portland-based writing group that practiced a technique called "dangerous writing". This technique, developed by American author Tom Spanbauer, emphasizes the use of minimalist prose, and the use of painful, personal experiences for inspiration. Under Spanbauer's influence, Palahniuk produced an early draft of what would later become his novel Invisible Monsters (1999), but it was rejected by all publishers he submitted it to. Palahniuk then wrote a second novel, expanding on his short story, "Fight Club". Initially, Fight Club was published as a seven-page short story in the compilation Pursuit of Happiness (1995), but Palahniuk expanded it to novel length (in which the original short story became chapter six); Fight Club: A Novel was published in 1996.

Fight Club: A Novel was re-issued in 1999 and 2004; the latter edition includes the author's introduction about the conception and popularity of the novel and movie, in which Palahniuk states:

...bookstores were full of books like The Joy Luck Club and The Divine Secrets of the Ya-Ya Sisterhood and How to Make an American Quilt. These were all novels that presented a social model for women to be together. But there was no novel that presented a new social model for men to share their lives.

He later explains:

Really, what I was writing was just The Great Gatsby updated a little. It was 'apostolic' fiction—where a surviving apostle tells the story of his hero. There are two men and a woman. And one man, the hero, is shot to death.

One critic has noted that this essay can be seen as Palahniuk's way of interpreting his own novel. According to this critic, Palahniuk's essay emphasizes the communicative and romantic elements of the novel while it deemphasizes its transgressive elements.

In interviews, the writer has said he is still approached by people wanting to know the location of the nearest fight club. Palahniuk insists there is no such real organization. He has heard of real fight clubs, some said to have existed before the novel. Project Mayhem is inspired by the Cacophony Society, of which Palahniuk is a member, and other events derived from stories told to him.

Fight Club's cultural impact is evidenced by the establishment of fight clubs by teenagers and "techies" in the United States. Pranks, such as food-tampering, have been repeated by fans of the book, documented in Palahniuk's essay "Monkey Think, Monkey Do", in the book Stranger Than Fiction: True Stories (2004) and in the introduction to the 2004 re-issue of Fight Club. Other fans have been inspired to undertake prosocial activity, and told Palahniuk that the novel had encouraged them to return to college.

== Adaptations ==
In addition to the feature film, a stage adaptation by Dylan Yates has been performed in Seattle and in Charlotte, North Carolina. In 2004, work began on a musical theater adaptation by Palahniuk, Fincher, and Trent Reznor, to premiere on the film's 10th anniversary. In 2015, the project was still in development, with Julie Taymor having been added to the creative team.

== Characters ==
=== The Narrator ===
A modern-day everyman figure as well as an employee specializing in recalls for an unnamed car company, the Narrator—who remains unnamed throughout the novel—is extremely depressed and has insomnia. Some readers call him "Joe", because of his constant use of the name in such statements as, "I am Joe's boiling point". The quotes, "I am Joe's [blank]", refer to the Narrator's reading old Reader's Digest articles in which human organs write about themselves in the first person, with titles such as "I Am Joe's Liver". The film adaptation replaces "Joe" with "Jack", inspiring some fans to call the Narrator "Jack". In the novel and film, the Narrator uses various aliases in the support groups. His subconscious is in need of a sense of freedom, he inevitably feels trapped within his own body, and when introduced to Tyler Durden, he begins to see all of the qualities he lacks in himself: "I love everything about Tyler Durden, his courage, his smarts, and his nerve. Tyler is funny and forceful and independent, and men look up to him and expect him to change their world. Tyler is capable and free, and I am not." In the unofficial meta sequel comic book series also penned by Palahniuk (with art by Cameron Stewart), Fight Club 2, it is revealed that the Narrator has chosen to be identified by the name of Sebastian.

=== Tyler Durden ===
"Because of his nature", Tyler works night jobs where he sabotages companies and harms clients. He also steals left-over drained human fat from liposuction clinics to supplement his income through soap making and to create the ingredients for bomb manufacturing, which will be put to use with the underground brawling circuit known as Fight Club, of which he is co-founder (as he instigated the fight that led to it). He later launches Project Mayhem, by which he and other members commit various attacks on consumerism. Tyler is blond, according to the Narrator's comment ("in his everything-blond way").

=== Marla Singer ===
A woman whom the Narrator meets during a support group. The Narrator no longer receives the same relief from the groups when he realizes Marla is faking her problems just as he is. After he leaves the groups, he meets her again when she becomes Tyler's lover. Marla is shown to be extremely unkempt, uncaring, and sometimes even suicidal. At times, she shows a softer, more caring side. Coinciding with the novel's neo-noir themes, Marla plays the role of the femme fatale, not only in her appearance but also in her role, serving firstly as a source of problems for the Narrator.

=== Robert "Big Bob" Paulson ===
The Narrator meets Bob at a support group for testicular cancer. A former bodybuilder, Bob lost his testicles to cancer caused by the steroids he used to bulk up his muscles. His treatment with testosterone injections and resultant increased estrogen levels have caused him to grow breasts and develop a softer voice. Because of his "bitch tits", Bob is the only member who is allowed to wear a shirt during fights. The Narrator befriends Bob and, after leaving the groups, meets him again in fight club. Bob's death later in the story, while carrying out an assignment for Project Mayhem, causes the Narrator to turn against Tyler because the members of Project Mayhem treat it as a trivial matter instead of a tragedy.

Bob was the only member of Project Mayhem that didn't fully complete the three-day initiation phase. The Narrator goes and convinces him to stay. He is also the only one to get killed.

=== Angel Face ===
A man who joins Fight Club. He is very loyal to Project Mayhem, laughing at the vandalism he and a group of "space monkeys" have caused as their crimes appear on the evening news. Angel Face is considered very beautiful, hence his name. The blond-haired beauty suffers a savage beating at the Narrator's hands during a Fight Club session; the Narrator states that he "wanted to destroy something beautiful." The next time Angel Face is heard of in the novel, he is described as not being quite as beautiful anymore. Whereas in the book it is that excessive beating which triggers the foundation of Project Mayhem (Fight Club no longer being a sufficient outlet), in the movie the beating seems to be caused primarily by the Narrator's jealousy.

== Motifs ==
=== Destruction of art ===
At two points in the novel, the Narrator claims he wants to "wipe [his] ass with the Mona Lisa"; a mechanic who joins fight club repeats this to him in one scene. This motif shows his desire for chaos, later expressed by the Narrator as an urge to "destroy something beautiful". Additionally, he mentions at one point that "Nothing is static. Even the Mona Lisa is falling apart." This is most explicitly stated in the scene the mechanic appears in:

The mechanic says, "If you're male and you're Christian and living in America, your father is your model for God. And if you never know your father, if your father bails out or dies or is never at home, what do you believe about God?
...
How Tyler saw it was that getting God's attention for being bad was better than getting no attention at all. Maybe because God's hate is better than His indifference.
If you could be either God's worst enemy or nothing, which would you choose?
We are God's middle children, according to Tyler Durden, with no special place in history and no special attention.
Unless we get God's attention, we have no hope of damnation or redemption.
Which is worse, hell or nothing?
Only if we're caught and punished can we be saved.

"Burn the Louvre," the mechanic says, "and wipe your ass with the Mona Lisa. This way at least, God would know our names."

— Fight Club, page 141

Kennett further argues that Tyler wants to use this chaos to change history so that "God's middle children" will have some historical significance, whether or not this significance results in "damnation or redemption". These endeavours will figuratively return to them their absent fathers, as judgment by future generations will replace judgment by their fathers.

=== Reader's Digest ===
After seeing Reader's Digest articles written from the perspective of the organs of a man named Joe, the Narrator begins using similar quotations to describe his feelings. He often replaces organs with feelings and things involved in his life (such as "I am Joe's smirking revenge").

=== Cornflower blue ===
Cornflower blue is a color associated with the Narrator's boss; it is revealed that he chose that particular shade of blue to highlight an icon. It is also mentioned later on that the Narrator's boss has eyes which are exactly the same color. All of Palahniuk's subsequent novels have featured references to cornflower blue.

=== Isolationism ===
Isolationism, specifically directed towards material items and possessions, is a common theme throughout the novel, especially in relation to consumerism. Tyler acts as the major catalyst behind the destruction of our vanities, which he claims is the path to finding our inner selves. "I'm breaking my attachment to physical power and possessions," Tyler whispered, "because only through destroying myself can I discover the greater power of my spirit."

=== Mental illness ===
David McCracken discusses in his article "Disability Studies Simulacra in Chuck Palahniuk's Fight Club(s)" about how within the context of Fight Club, there is a "'spiritual depression' [that] is congruent with spiritual disability, a malaise that impairs men and women from feeling an inner peace, a mystical transcendence, a euphoric sense of connection with a greater entity". McCracken points out the importance of the support group chapters as it depicts victims overcoming biological and/or psychological diseases. McCracken claims that Fight Club can be seen as a "recovery text", as "Fight Club may indeed be considered a story about the transition from spiritual deficiency, or spiritual bankruptcy as it is termed in a discussion of the first step in Alcoholics Anonymous (21), to spiritual awakening and consequently spiritual empowerment—the move from disability (spiritual depression) to ability (spiritual vitality)". In the support group chapters, Palahniuk depicts, for the most part, the traditional protocols within existing recovery communities, "the reflection of a profound reality". McCracken continues to highlight how Palahniuk juxtaposes the support group with fight club, and this is utilized to continue to show the mental illness parallels between the characters participating within the club. A comparison that is seen between the two groups, that actually shows their similarity more than anything, is anonymity. The practice of remaining anonymous is to ensure that everyone is equal, "at least in terms of identifiable status designations, and along the lines of disablism/ableism, legislated mediocracy rules".

== Themes ==
Jesse Kavadlo, a professor at Maryville University of St. Louis, argues that the Narrator's opposition to emasculation is a form of projection, and the problem that he fights is himself. He also argues that Palahniuk uses existentialism in the novel to conceal subtexts of feminism and romance, in order to convey these concepts in a novel that is mainly aimed at a male audience. In an essay titled "Fight Club and the Disneyfication of Manhood," Cameron White and Trenia Walker suggest that Project Mayhem's ultimate goal, through the destruction of financial institutions, is to shatter what society deems "real" manhood, reducing manhood to survival instincts. Paul Skinner has also echoed this sentiment, stating, "the anger and dissatisfaction of the male characters is against one type of masculinity being suppressed by post-industrial consumerist society". Palahniuk gives a simpler assertion about the theme of the novel, stating "all my books are about a lonely person looking for some way to connect with other people."

Paul Kennett argues that because the Narrator's fights with Tyler are fights with himself, and because he fights himself in front of his boss at the hotel, the Narrator is using the fights as a way of asserting himself as his own boss. These fights are a representation of the struggle of the proletarian at the hands of a higher capitalist power; by asserting himself as capable of having the same power he thus becomes his own master. Later when fight club is formed, the participants are all dressed and groomed similarly, allowing them to symbolically fight themselves at the club and gain the same power.

Tyler becomes nostalgic for patriarchal power giving him control and creates Project Mayhem to achieve this. Through this proto-fascist power structure, the Narrator seeks to learn "what, or rather, who, he might have been under a firm patriarchy." Through his position as leader of Project Mayhem, Tyler uses his power to become a "God/Father" to the "space monkeys" (the other members of Project Mayhem), although by the end of the novel his words hold more power than he does, as is evident in the space monkeys' threat to castrate the Narrator when he contradicts Tyler's rule. According to Kennett, this creates a paradox in that Tyler pushes the idea that men who wish to be free from a controlling father-figure are only self-actualized once they have children and become a father themselves, thus becoming controllers themselves in an endless cycle of patriarchal repression.

Johannes Hell argues that Palahniuk's use of the Narrator's somnambulism is a simple attempt at emphasizing the dangerous yet daring possibilities of life. Hell enforces the importance of the Narrator's sleepwalking and intense deprivation, for they have a firm influence on suffering readers," from a twisted perspective this is solace for everybody who suffers from somnambulism in a sense, that things could be worse, much worse in fact.

Project Mayhem's terrorism in Fight Club has been analyzed within the context of the terrorist attacks of September 11th, 2001. In 2007, Ruth Quiney examined this link, stating that Fight Club's depiction of disaffected Western men joining a homegrown terrorist group anticipated some aspects of the war on terror. Jesse Kavadlo, in his essay "With Us or Against Us: Chuck Palahniuk's 9/11," claims that Palahniuk was almost prophetic in predicting future acts of terror. He writes, "Palahniuk's work demonstrates the disturbing intersections between the multiple meanings of the word "plot": narrative, conspiratorial, and funereal, the word reminding us of the linguistic connections between our stories, our secrets, and our entombment."

Olivia Burgess believes that the necessity of violence as revolution is evident in how bodies are described in the novel. The fight club “allows men to fiercely embody revolution and desire and rejuvenate utopia”, experiencing sensations through their own aging, injured bodies. In the fight club, physical violence is consensual, and the self is liberated through immediate “violence and pain”. Characters do not have to wait for a possibility of a utopia, when they can fight for a utopia in the moment. Burgess argues that the violence of fight club is necessary for revolution, while Project Mayhem is malicious violence that does not liberate anybody. On the other hand, Barker believes that the fight club is just as malicious as Project Mayhem, proclaiming that both perpetuate fascist systems.

== Reception ==
At the time of its publication, Fight Club was well-received critically. It was called "brilliantly creepy" by The Washington Post, and "unsettling and nerve-chafing" by The Seattle Times. The Baltimore Sun commended its very publication, stating, "bravo to Norton for having the courage to publish it." For many critics, Fight Club is considered the embodiment of Palahniuk's writing style and thematic concerns.

The "forecasts" section of a 1996 Publishers Weekly praised the novel:

Writing in an iconic deadpan and including something to offend everyone, Palahniuk is a risky writer who takes chances galore, especially with a particularly bizarre plot twist he throws in late in the book. Caustic, outrageous, bleakly funny, violent, and always unsettling, Palahniuk's utterly original creation will make even the most jaded reader sit up and take notice.

Some critics have condemned Fight Club because of its violent, heteronormative themes and cult philosophy. Peter Matthews, however, argues that these critics often overlook the novel's ironic critique of its characters' violent worldview.

The book received critical interest and eventually generated cinematic-adaptation interest. In 1999, screenwriters Jim Uhls, August Olsen, and co-producers Conor Strait and Aaron Curry joined director David Fincher. The film "failed" at the box office, but a cult following emerged with the DVD edition and as a result, an original, hardcover edition of the novel is now a collector's item.

Following its film adaptation, the novel gained popularity among young, male American readers. Critics have attributed Fight Club's popularity with this audience to its critique of an emasculating consumerist culture, and to the implied message that modern men need revert to their primal, aggressive nature. The Evening Standard said the novel was the origin of the term "snowflake". "I coined 'snowflake' and I stand by it", Palahniuk said in 2017. "Every generation gets offended by different things but my friends who teach in high school tell me that their students are very easily offended ... The modern Left is always reacting to things. Once they get their show on the road culturally they will stop being so offended."

The novel won the following awards:

- 1997 Pacific Northwest Booksellers Association Award
- 1997 Oregon Book Award for Best Novel

== Sequels ==
Palahniuk was convinced to continue Fight Club in comic book form by fellow novelist Chelsea Cain and comic writers Brian Michael Bendis, Matt Fraction and Kelly Sue DeConnick.

At the 2013 San Diego Comic-Con, Palahniuk announced that a sequel to Fight Club is in the works and will take the form of a serialized graphic novel. According to Palahniuk, "It will likely be a series of books that update the story ten years after the seeming end of Tyler Durden. Nowadays, Tyler is telling the story, lurking inside Sebastian, and ready to launch a come-back. Sebastian is oblivious. Marla is bored. Their marriage has run aground on the rocky coastline of middle-aged suburban boredom. It's only when their little boy disappears, kidnapped by Tyler, that Sebastian is dragged back into the world of Mayhem." Dark Horse Comics published this new story in a 10-issue maxi series, written by Palahniuk and illustrated by Cameron Stewart, starting in 2015. Artist David W. Mack, who is friends with Palahniuk, illustrated the covers for the series and has said of the material, "The twists and turns are just primo artifacts of Chuck Palahniuk's brain material."

A teaser was released by Dark Horse Comics for Free Comic Book Day 2015, with Fight Club 2 #1 following in late May of that year. The series explores Joseph Campbell's concept of the 'second father' as being vital to the hero's journey, which is something that has always fascinated Palahniuk.

On the Orbital In Conversation podcast, Chuck stated that he is already working on Fight Club 3, which will also be in comic form. He also confirmed that he is working on a series of original short stories for comics which will appear as one-shots before eventually being collected into a single book.

Fight Club 3 consists of 12 issues, with the first one being released on January 30, 2019.

== Prequel ==
Expedition is a short-story prequel to Fight Club, released in Palahniuk's Make Something Up: Stories You Can't Unread.

== U.S. editions ==
- New York: W. W. Norton & Company, August 1996. Hardcover first edition. ISBN 0-393-03976-5
- New York: Owl Books, 1997. First trade paperback. ISBN 0-8050-5437-5
- New York: Owl Books, 1999. Trade paperback reissue (film tie-in cover). ISBN 0-8050-6297-1
- Minneapolis, MN: HighBridge Company, 1999. Unabridged audiobook on 4 cassettes, read by J. Todd Adams. ISBN 1-56511-330-6
- Minneapolis, MN: Tandem Books, 1999. School & library binding. ISBN 0-613-91882-7
- New York: Owl Books, 2004. Trade paperback reissue, with a new introduction by the author (bloody lip cover). ISBN 0-8050-7647-6
- New York: Owl Books, 2004. Trade paperback reissue, with a new introduction by the author (film tie-in cover). ISBN 0-8050-7655-7
- New York: W. W. Norton & Company, 2005. Trade paperback (first cover). ISBN 0-393-32734-5
- New York: Recorded Books LLC, 2008. Unabridged audiobook on 5 CDs, Read by James Colby. ISBN 978-1-4361-4960-0

== See also ==
- 1996 in literature
- Dissociative identity disorder
- Transgressive fiction
- What Would Tyler Durden Do?—gossip blog named after the character; in turn a play on the popular phrase "What would Jesus do?"
