= List of awards and nominations received by Brad Pitt =

Brad Pitt awards and nominations
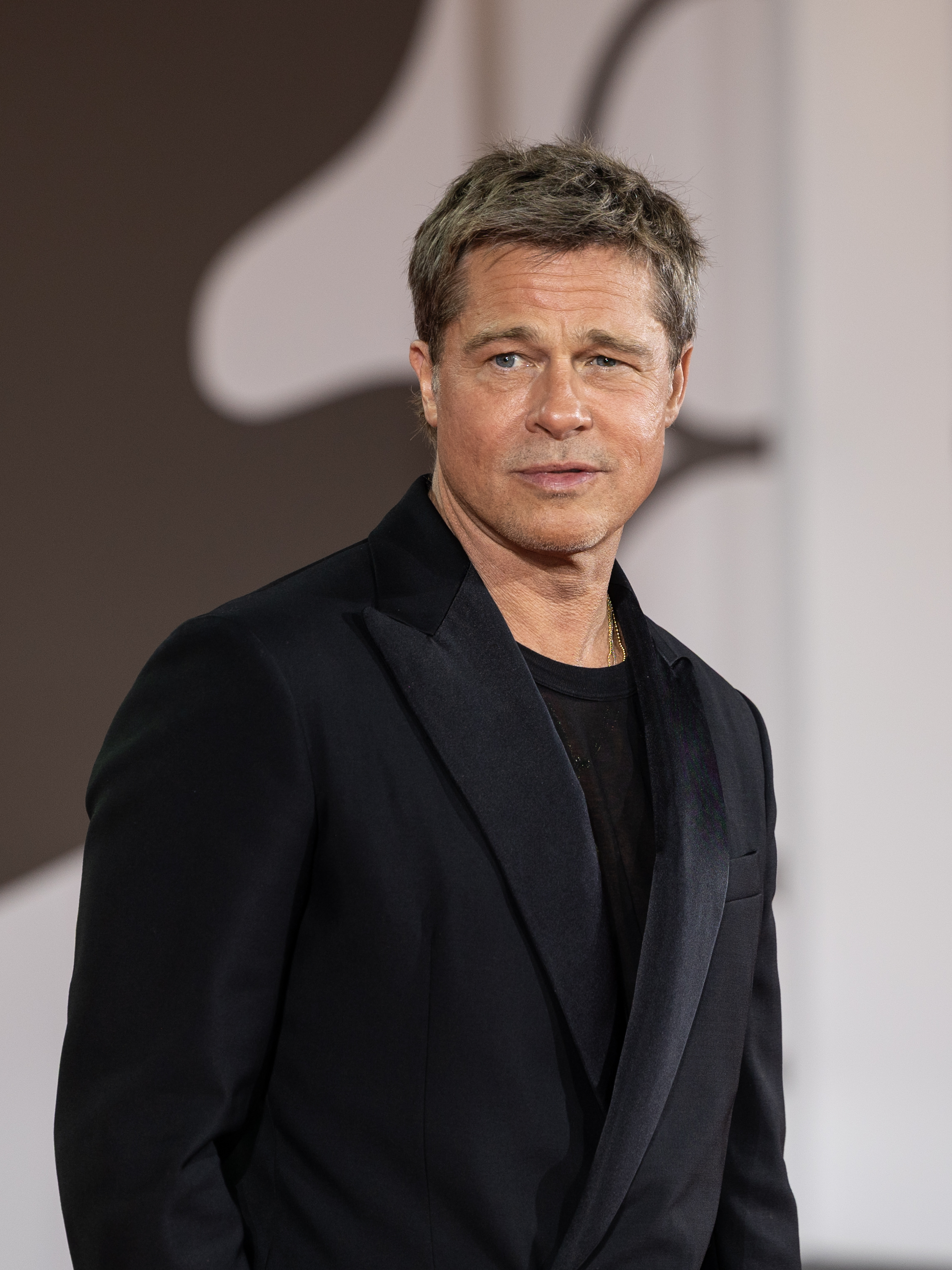
- Pitt at the Venice Film Festival in 2024
Awards and nominations
Award	Wins	Nominations
Academy Awards	2	8
BAFTA Awards	2	7
Emmy Awards	2	7
Golden Globe Awards	2	7
SAG Awards	2	10

Totals (Note: Certain award groups do not simply award one winner. They acknowledge several different recipients, have runners-up, and have third place. Since this is a specific recognition and is different from losing an award, runner-up mentions are considered wins in this award tally. For simplification and to avoid errors, each award in this list has been presumed to have had a prior nomination.)
- Wins: 54
- Nominations: 79

Brad Pitt is an American actor and film producer. He has received various accolades including two Academy Awards, a British Academy Film Award, two Primetime Emmy Awards, two Golden Globe Awards, and two Screen Actors Guild Awards.

In 1994, Pitt starred as the vampire Louis de Pointe du Lac in the horror film Interview with the Vampire: The Vampire Chronicles, which earned him the MTV Movie Award for Most Desirable Male, and the MTV Movie Award for Best Actor in a Movie. The next year, Pitt appeared in Terry Gilliam's science fiction film 12 Monkeys, for which he won the Golden Globe Award for Best Supporting Actor – Motion Picture and earned his first Academy Awards nomination for Best Supporting Actor. In 2008, Pitt starred in the fantasy romantic drama The Curious Case of Benjamin Button. For his performance, he was nominated for his first Academy Award for Best Actor, his first BAFTA Award for Best Actor in a Leading Role nomination, Golden Globe Award for Best Actor – Motion Picture Drama, and Screen Actors Guild Award for Outstanding Performance by a Male Actor in a Leading Role. In 2011, Pitt produced and acted in biographical sports drama Moneyball. He was nominated for numerous accolades as an actor and producer including, Academy Award for Best Actor, BAFTA Award for Best Actor in a Leading Role, Golden Globe Award for Best Actor – Motion Picture Drama, and Screen Actors Guild Award for Outstanding Performance by a Male Actor in a Leading Role.

In 2013, Pitt produced and performed in biographical period-drama 12 Years a Slave. He portrayed Samuel Bass, a Canadian laborer who expresses his opposition to slavery. Pitt won Screen Actors Guild Award for Outstanding Performance by a Cast in a Motion Picture. In 2019, Pitt starred in Quentin Tarantino's comedy-drama Once Upon a Time in Hollywood. He won the Academy Award for Best Supporting Actor, AACTA International Award for Best Supporting Actor, Golden Globe Award for Best Supporting Actor – Motion Picture, and Screen Actors Guild Award for Outstanding Performance by a Cast in a Motion Picture.

== Major associations ==
=== Academy Awards ===
Year	Category	Nominated work	Result	Ref.
1996	Best Supporting Actor	12 Monkeys	Nominated	
2009	Best Actor	The Curious Case of Benjamin Button	Nominated	
2012	Best Actor	Moneyball	Nominated	
2012	Best Picture	Moneyball	Nominated	
2014	Best Picture	12 Years a Slave	Won	
2016	Best Picture	The Big Short	Nominated	
2020	Best Supporting Actor	Once Upon a Time in Hollywood	Won	
2026	Best Picture	F1	Nominated	

=== BAFTA Awards ===
Year	Category	Nominated work	Result	Ref.
British Academy Film Awards
2007	Best Film	The Departed	Nominated	
2009	Best Actor in a Supporting Role	Burn After Reading	Nominated	
2009	Best Actor in a Leading Role	The Curious Case of Benjamin Button	Nominated	
2012	Best Actor in a Leading Role	Moneyball	Nominated	
2014	Best Film	12 Years a Slave	Won	
2016	Best Film	The Big Short	Nominated	
2020	Best Actor in a Supporting Role	Once Upon a Time in Hollywood	Won	

=== Emmy Awards ===
Year	Category	Nominated work	Result	Ref.
Primetime Emmy Awards
2002	Outstanding Guest Actor in a Comedy Series	Friends (episode: "The One with the Rumor")	Nominated	
2014	Outstanding Television Movie	The Normal Heart	Won	
2015	Outstanding Television Movie	Nightingale	Nominated	
2020	Outstanding Guest Actor in a Comedy Series	Saturday Night Live	Nominated	
2021	Outstanding Limited or Anthology Series	The Underground Railroad	Nominated	
2024	Outstanding Drama Series	3 Body Problem	Nominated	
2025	Outstanding Limited or Anthology Series	Adolescence	Won	

=== Golden Globe Awards ===
Year	Category	Nominated work	Result	Ref.
1995	Best Actor in a Motion Picture – Drama	Legends of the Fall	Nominated	
1996	Best Supporting Actor – Motion Picture	12 Monkeys	Won	
2007	Best Supporting Actor – Motion Picture	Babel	Nominated	
2009	Best Actor in a Motion Picture – Drama	The Curious Case of Benjamin Button	Nominated	
2012	Best Actor in a Motion Picture – Drama	Moneyball	Nominated	
2020	Best Supporting Actor – Motion Picture	Once Upon a Time in Hollywood	Won	
2023	Best Supporting Actor – Motion Picture	Babylon	Nominated	

=== Screen Actors Guild Awards ===
Year	Category	Nominated work	Result	Ref.
2007	Outstanding Cast in a Motion Picture	Babel	Nominated	
2009	Outstanding Male Actor in a Leading Role	The Curious Case of Benjamin Button	Nominated	
2009	Outstanding Cast in a Motion Picture	The Curious Case of Benjamin Button	Nominated	
2010	Outstanding Cast in a Motion Picture	Inglourious Basterds	Won	
2012	Outstanding Male Actor in a Leading Role	Moneyball	Nominated	
2014	Outstanding Cast in a Motion Picture	12 Years a Slave	Nominated	
2016	Outstanding Cast in a Motion Picture	The Big Short	Nominated	
2020	Outstanding Cast in a Motion Picture	Once Upon a Time in Hollywood	Nominated	
2020	Outstanding Male Actor in a Supporting Role	Once Upon a Time in Hollywood	Won	
2023	Outstanding Cast in a Motion Picture	Babylon	Nominated	

== Miscellaneous awards ==
Year	Award	Category	Nominated work	Result	Ref.
2012	Alliance of Women Film Journalists	Best Ensemble Cast	Moneyball	Nominated	
2019	Alliance of Women Film Journalists	Best Supporting Actor	Once Upon a Time in Hollywood	Won	
2025	Astra Midseason Movie Awards	Best Actor	F1	Nominated	
2019	Australian Academy of Cinema and Television Arts Awards	Best International Supporting Actor	Once Upon a Time in Hollywood	Won	
2011	Boston Society of Film Critics	Best Actor	Moneyball	Won	
2019	Boston Society of Film Critics	Best Supporting Actor	Once Upon a Time in Hollywood	Won	
2019	Capri Hollywood International Film Festival	Best Ensemble Cast	Once Upon a Time in Hollywood	Won	
2009	Critics' Choice Movie Awards	Best Movie Actor	The Curious Case of Benjamin Button	Nominated	
2009	Critics' Choice Movie Awards	Best Acting Ensemble	The Curious Case of Benjamin Button	Nominated	
2010	Critics' Choice Movie Awards	Best Acting Ensemble	Inglourious Basterds	Won	
2012	Critics' Choice Movie Awards	Best Movie Actor	Moneyball	Nominated	
2014	Critics' Choice Movie Awards	Best Action Movie Actor	World War Z	Nominated	
2015	Critics' Choice Movie Awards	Best Action Movie Actor	Fury	Nominated	
2016	Critics' Choice Movie Awards	Best Comedy	The Big Short	Won	
2016	Critics' Choice Movie Awards	Best Acting Ensemble	The Big Short	Nominated	
2020	Critics' Choice Movie Awards	Best Movie Supporting Actor	Once Upon a Time in Hollywood	Won	
2020	Critics' Choice Movie Awards	Best Acting Ensemble	Once Upon a Time in Hollywood	Nominated	
2020	Critics' Choice Movie Awards	Best Horror or Sci-Fi Movie	Ad Astra	Nominated	
2006	Chicago Film Critics Association	Best Supporting Actor	Babel	Nominated	
2011	Chicago Film Critics Association	Best Supporting Actor	The Tree of Life	Nominated	
2019	Chicago Film Critics Association	Best Supporting Actor	Once Upon a Time in Hollywood	Won	
2008	Dallas–Fort Worth Film Critics Association	Best Actor	The Curious Case of Benjamin Button	4th runner-up	
2011	Dallas–Fort Worth Film Critics Association	Best Actor	Moneyball	Nominated	
2019	Dallas–Fort Worth Film Critics Association	Best Supporting Actor	Once Upon a Time in Hollywood	Won	
2011	Detroit Film Critics Society	Best Actor	Moneyball	Nominated	
2015	Detroit Film Critics Society	Best Ensemble	The Big Short	Nominated	
2019	Detroit Film Critics Society	Best Supporting Actor	Once Upon a Time in Hollywood	Nominated	
2015	Florida Film Critics Circle	Best Ensemble	The Big Short	Nominated	
2019	Florida Film Critics Circle	Best Supporting Actor	Once Upon a Time in Hollywood	Nominated	
2011	Georgia Film Critics Association	Best Actor	Moneyball	Won	
2011	Georgia Film Critics Association	Best Supporting Actor	The Tree of Life	Won	
2019	Georgia Film Critics Association	Best Supporting Actor	Once Upon a Time in Hollywood	Nominated	
1995	Golden Raspberry Awards	Worst Screen Couple	Interview with the Vampire	Won (Note: Shared with Tom Cruise)	
2023	Golden Raspberry Awards	Worst Picture	Blonde	Won	
2012	Guys Choice	Guy of the Year	—	Won	
2019	Hollywood Critics Association	Best Supporting Actor	Once Upon a Time in Hollywood	Nominated	
2008	Houston Film Critics Society	Best Actor	The Curious Case of Benjamin Button	Nominated	
2008	Houston Film Critics Society	Best Supporting Actor	Burn After Reading	Nominated	
2011	Houston Film Critics Society	Best Actor	Moneyball	Nominated	
2019	Houston Film Critics Society	Best Supporting Actor	Once Upon a Time in Hollywood	Won	
2012	Jupiter Award	Best International Actor	The Tree of Life	Nominated	
1995	MTV Movie & TV Awards	Best Male Performance	Interview with the Vampire	Won	
1995	MTV Movie & TV Awards	Most Desirable Male	Interview with the Vampire	Won	
1995	MTV Movie & TV Awards	Best On-Screen Duo	Interview with the Vampire	Nominated	
1996	MTV Movie & TV Awards	Best Male Performance	12 Monkeys	Nominated	
1996	MTV Movie & TV Awards	Most Desirable Male	Seven	Won	
1996	MTV Movie & TV Awards	Best On-Screen Duo	Seven	Nominated (Note: Shared with Morgan Freeman)	
2002	MTV Movie & TV Awards	Best On-Screen Team	Ocean's Eleven	Nominated (Note: Shared with Casey Affleck, Scott Caan, Don Cheadle, George Clooney, Matt Damon, Elliott Gould, Eddie Jemison, Bernie Mac, Shaobo Qin and Carl Reiner)	
2005	MTV Movie & TV Awards	Best Male Performance	Troy	Nominated	
2005	MTV Movie & TV Awards	Best Fight	Troy	Nominated (Note: Shared with Eric Bana)	
2006	MTV Movie & TV Awards	Best Kiss	Mr. & Mrs. Smith	Nominated (Note: Shared with Angelina Jolie)	
2006	MTV Movie & TV Awards	Best Fight	Mr. & Mrs. Smith	Won	
2014	MTV Movie & TV Awards	Best Scared-As-S**t Performance	World War Z	Won	
2022	MTV Movie & TV Awards	Best Team	The Lost City	Nominated (Note: shared with Sandra Bullock and Channing Tatum)	
2015	National Board of Review	Best Ensemble	The Big Short	Won	
2019	National Board of Review	Best Supporting Actor	Once Upon a Time in Hollywood	Won	
2011	National Society of Film Critics	Best Actor	Moneyball	Won	
2011	National Society of Film Critics	Best Actor	The Tree of Life	Won	
2019	National Society of Film Critics	Best Supporting Actor	Once Upon a Time in Hollywood	Won	
2011	New York Film Critics Circle	Best Actor	Moneyball	Won	
2011	New York Film Critics Circle	Best Actor	The Tree of Life	Won	
2011	Online Film Critics Society	Best Supporting Actor	The Tree of Life	Nominated	
2019	Online Film Critics Society	Best Supporting Actor	Once Upon a Time in Hollywood	Won	
2007	Palm Springs International Film Festival	Ensemble Cast Award	Babel	Won	
2011	Palm Springs International Film Festival	Desert Palm Achievement Award	Moneyball	Won	
2011	Palm Springs International Film Festival	Desert Palm Achievement Award	The Tree of Life	Won	
2015	Palm Springs International Film Festival	Ensemble Cast Award	The Big Short	Won	
2006	People's Choice Awards	Favorite Leading Actor	—	Won	
2006	People's Choice Awards	Favorite on Screen Match-Up	Mr. & Mrs. Smith	Nominated	
2006	People's Choice Awards	Favorite Male Action Star	Mr. & Mrs. Smith	Nominated	
2008	People's Choice Awards	Favorite On Screen Match-up	Ocean's Thirteen	Won (Note: Shared with George Clooney)	
2010	People's Choice Awards	Favorite Movie Actor	Inglourious Basterds	Nominated	
2014	People's Choice Awards	Favorite Action Movie Actor	World War Z	Nominated	
2015	People's Choice Awards	Favorite Movie Actor	Fury	Nominated	
2015	People's Choice Awards	Favorite Dramatic Movie Actor	Fury	Nominated	
2019	People's Choice Awards	Favorite Dramatic Movie Actor	Once Upon a Time in Hollywood	Nominated	
2015	Producers Guild Awards	Outstanding Long-Form Television	The Normal Heart	Nominated	
2015	Producers Guild Awards	Visionary Award	The Normal Heart	Won	
2015	Producers Guild Awards	Stanley Kramer Award	The Normal Heart	Won	
1998	Rembrandt Award	Audience Choice	Seven Years in Tibet	Won	
2006	San Diego Film Critics Society	Best Ensemble Performance	Babel	Won	
2009	San Diego Film Critics Society	Best Ensemble Performance	Inglourious Basterds	Won	
2011	San Diego Film Critics Society	Best Actor	Moneyball	Nominated	
2019	San Diego Film Critics Society	Best Supporting Actor	Once Upon a Time in Hollywood	Won	
2019	Seattle Film Critics Society	Best Supporting Actor	Once Upon a Time in Hollywood	Nominated	
2011	St. Louis Film Critics Association	Best Actor	Moneyball	Nominated	
2019	St. Louis Film Critics Association	Best Supporting Actor	Once Upon a Time in Hollywood	Won	
2006	Satellite Awards	Best Supporting Actor in a Motion Picture	Babel	Nominated	
2020	Satellite Awards	Best Supporting Actor in a Motion Picture	Once Upon a Time in Hollywood	Nominated	
1996	Saturn Awards	Best Supporting Actor	12 Monkeys	Won	
2009	Saturn Awards	Best Actor	The Curious Case of Benjamin Button	Nominated	
2014	Saturn Awards	Best Actor	World War Z	Nominated	
2019	Toronto Film Critics Association	Best Supporting Actor	Once Upon a Time in Hollywood	Won	
2002	Teen Choice Awards	Best Actor in a Drama/Action Adventure	Ocean's Eleven	Nominated	
2005	Teen Choice Awards	Choice Movie: Dance Scene	Mr. & Mrs. Smith	Nominated	
2005	Teen Choice Awards	Choice Movie: Liplock	Mr. & Mrs. Smith	Nominated	
2005	Teen Choice Awards	Choice Movie: Chemistry	Mr. & Mrs. Smith	Nominated	
2005	Teen Choice Awards	Choice Movie: Liar	Mr. & Mrs. Smith	Nominated	
2005	Teen Choice Awards	Choice Movie Actor: Action	Mr. & Mrs. Smith	Nominated	
2005	Teen Choice Awards	Choice Movie: Rumble	Mr. & Mrs. Smith	Won	
2009	Teen Choice Awards	Choice Movie Actor: Drama	The Curious Case of Benjamin Button	Nominated	
2019	Vancouver Film Critics Circle	Best Supporting Actor	Once Upon a Time in Hollywood	Won	
2007	Venice Film Festival	Volpi Cup for Best Actor	The Assassination of Jesse James by the Coward Robert Ford	Won	
2011	Washington D.C. Area Film Critics Association	Best Actor	Moneyball	Nominated	
2015	Washington D.C. Area Film Critics Association	Best Acting Ensemble	The Big Short	Nominated	
2019	Washington D.C. Area Film Critics Association	Best Supporting Actor	Once Upon a Time in Hollywood	Won	

== See also ==
- Brad Pitt filmography
