= Fight Club 2 =

Comic book by Chuck Palahniuk

- Cover of Fight Club 2 #1

Publication information
- Publisher: Dark Horse Comics
- Schedule: Monthly
- Format: Mini-series
- Publication date: May 2015 – March 2016
- No. of issues: 10

Creative team
- Written by: Chuck Palahniuk
- Artist(s): Cameron Stewart, David Mack
- Letterer: Nate Piekos
- Colorist: Dave Stewart
- Editor: Scott Allie

Fight Club 2 (Note: also known as Fight Club 2: The Tranquility Gambit) is a ten-issue comic book limited series written by Chuck Palahniuk as a sequel to his 1996 novel Fight Club, with art by Cameron Stewart and covers by David Mack.

== Premise ==
Set ten years after the ending of Fight Club, the sequel is told from the restrained perspective of Tyler Durden as he sits in the subconscious of Sebastian (the name the narrator of the original Fight Club currently uses). Sebastian continues his dysfunctional relationship with Marla and has fallen into the mundane routine of society until Tyler re-emerges to cause chaos.

== Publication ==
Palahniuk was convinced to continue Fight Club in comic book form by fellow novelist Chelsea Cain and comic writers Brian Michael Bendis, Matt Fraction and Kelly Sue DeConnick. A teaser was released by Dark Horse Comics for Free Comic Book Day 2015, with Fight Club 2 #1 following in late May of that year. The series explores Joseph Campbell's concept of the 'second father' as being vital to the hero's journey, which is something that has always fascinated Palahniuk.

=== Issues ===
| Title | Release date | Story | Art | Colors | Cover | Notes |
|---|---|---|---|---|---|---|
| Free Comic Book Day 2015; Fight Club | May 2, 2015 | Chuck Palahniuk | Cameron Stewart | Dave Stewart | David Mack | |
A recap of the original story (as told in the novel, not the movie) told via flashback while the narrator is in a mental institution following the events of the novel.
| Fight Club 2 #1 | May 27, 2015 | Chuck Palahniuk | Cameron Stewart | Dave Stewart | David Mack; Cameron Stewart (variant); Lee Bermejo (variant); Steve Lieber (variant); Paul Pope (variant); Tim Seeley (variant); Chip Zdarsky (variant); Amanda Conner (variant); Joëlle Jonesv; Rafael Albuquerque (variant) | |
Ten years after the event of the first novel, Sebastian (the narrator from Fight Club) and Marla are married with a son. Sebastian works a do-nothing office job, at a military contractor company called "Rize or Die". Marla has grown tired of suburban life, resuming her habit of infiltrating support groups and ultimately resurrects Tyler Durden full time by replacing her husband's medication with placebos so she could have "an affair with Tyler". Tyler has other plans and burns down the family's house and apparently kills their son as a result.
| Fight Club 2 #2 | June 24, 2015 | Chuck Palahniuk | Cameron Stewart | Dave Stewart | David Mack; Francesco Francavilla (variant); David Mack (ultra variant) | |
The body in the burnt out wreckage of Sebastian and Marla's home turns out to be a stranger (a new recruit for Project Mayhem that, in exchange for Tyler funding his college education, had to be in the top five percent of his class lest he forfeit his life to Tyler). Furthermore, it is revealed that Sebastian's psychiatrist is on Tyler's payroll and had been freeing Tyler for one hour, three times a week, for ten years before Marla permanently liberated him. In that time, Tyler created the "Rize or Die" group and turned Fight Club into a full-on terror group, responsible for war throughout the world. Meanwhile, it is revealed to Marla that Sebastian's father had been killed in a similar house fire, which financed Sebastian through college. Sebastian begins to suspect Tyler had been active long before the events of the novel and sets out to visit his childhood home.
| Fight Club 2 #3 | July 22, 2015 | Chuck Palahniuk | Cameron Stewart | Dave Stewart | David Mack; Cameron Stewart (variant) | |
Sebastian arrives at his childhood home, which has been converted into a recruitment center for Tyler's new group: Project Chaos. After a speech from the head of the recruitment center about how men have lost all of their role models, due to feminism making it impossible for men to hold positions of power without being falsely accused by vindictive women, Tyler appears and announces his overall plan that he has been working on since the ending of the first book. Tyler plans on the systematic overthrow of all world governments, through Sebastian's son; who he plans on training and modeling into a leader akin to Alexander the great. Sebastian refuses but cannot stop Tyler from seizing control over his body.
| Fight Club 2 #4 | August 26, 2015 | Chuck Palahniuk | Cameron Stewart | Dave Stewart | David Mack; Anthony Palumbo (variant) | |
After Tyler tries to rape Marla, Marla flees town and discovers a wide variety of Fight Club "spin-off" groups have formed around quilting, creative writing, film viewing, recreational drinking etc., all inspired by Tyler and "Fight Club". With help from a child with progeria, Marla convinces the "Magic Wand" foundation to give her the resources to kill third world dictators and heads to the Middle East to investigate "Rize Or Die". At the compound, ties between ISIS and Project Mayhem are revealed when a member of Project Mayhem is given his assignment as an ISIS suicide bomber, implying that Tyler is behind ISIS as part of his desire to destabilize the Middle East as part of his plans for global anarchy. Sebastian (now back in control over his body) shaves his head and attends the Fight Club cell's fight night. However, the young preppy kids who make up the Fight Club cell shun Sebastian as being "too old" and not worthy of fighting them. This changes when Sebastian is called out by Angel Face; a former member of the original Fight Club whose handsome features have been erased entirely by ten years of constant fighting. Though Angel Face initially dominates Sebastian, Sebastian eventually overpowers Angel Face and defeats him.
| Fight Club 2 #5 | September 23, 2015 | Chuck Palahniuk | Cameron Stewart | Dave Stewart | David Mack; Steve Morris (variant) | |
Tyler takes control over Sebastian's body after beating Angel Face for breaking a new Fight Club rule Tyler has established: members are forbidden to strike Tyler in the face during any fight, due to Tyler's growing vanity over his appearance. Tyler then visits his son at a mansion filled with priceless artwork Tyler has stolen for his own private collection, as Tyler contemplates "killing" Sebastian. Sebastian and several other Project Mayhem members, loaded up on drugs and blood thinner are then sent out to destroy artwork Tyler does not like by spraying it with their own blood via the severing a major artery in their arms. Meanwhile Marla and her ally, who reveals herself to be an elderly midget woman who pretends to be a child suffering from progeria for attention, are confronted by female mercenaries working for Rize Or Die in the Middle East and are apparently blown up by missile strike ordered by the mercenaries.
| Fight Club 2 #6 | October 28, 2015 | Chuck Palahniuk | Cameron Stewart | Dave Stewart | David Mack; Duncan Fegredo (variant) | |
Sebastian has an inexplicable encounter with his son. Marla and her cohort search the world’s conflict zones, and are — it appears — killed in a blast of artillery fire. Tyler, fearful that Sebastian is discovering too much, too fast, sends him on a gory homework assignment that he’ll never hope to survive.
| Fight Club 2 #7 | November 25, 2015 | Chuck Palahniuk | Cameron Stewart | Dave Stewart | David Mack; Duncan Fegredo (variant) | |
To survive, Sebastian must pretend to be Tyler. If he can bluff his way into Tyler’s hideout, he can rescue his son. But when he gets word that his wife is dead, he is bereft, and Tyler, ever the troublemaker, insists that Dr. Wrong is the real mastermind who plans to kill them all and seize control of the world. Is there no one Sebastian can trust?
| Fight Club 2 #8 | December 23, 2015 | Chuck Palahniuk | Cameron Stewart | Dave Stewart | David Mack; Steve Morris (variant); Michael Oeming (variant) | |
Marla and her growing army of child soldiers track her son to a mountain stronghold and lay siege. Tyler takes Sebastian on a dreamland tour to explain human history and the new future Rize or Die has planned. Sebastian, it would seem, is only the latest man in many generations to have his life steered and destroyed by Tyler. Tyler spreads like a virus—he is passed down from generation to generation, and now that Junior has Tyler in him, he no longer needs Sebastian. The writers of Write Klub are no help whatsoever.
| Fight Club 2 #9 | February 24, 2016 | Chuck Palahniuk | Cameron Stewart | Dave Stewart | David Mack; Bill Sienkiewicz (variant); Jonathan Case (variant) | |
Tyler’s minions stow all the world’s treasures before they trigger Armageddon—or as they call it, the Tranquility Gambit. Sebastian is forced to battle his own son as he and Marla rekindle their love. But once their family is reunited, they’re all buried alive in a huge salt cavern. Things look grim for everyone.
| Fight Club 2 #10 | March 30, 2016 | Chuck Palahniuk | Cameron Stewart | Dave Stewart | David Mack; Steve Morris (variant); Tyler Crook (variant) | |
In a metafictional ending, Palahniuk himself is running the story of Fight Club 2 by a group of fellow comic book writers and friends. They do not approve of Palahniuk's original ending, in which Tyler's attempt to destroy the world outside of his concrete bunker succeeds. Palahniuk reveals the true ending to the story—there was never a nuclear holocaust, and the nuclear weapons Tyler had been hoarding as part of Rize or Die had been used to bury everyone in the bunker alive to put a stop to Tyler and Rize or Die. However, a legion of angry Fight Club fans arrive at Palahniuk's doorstep, unhappy with this ending as well; they've seen the movie but not read the book, and identify with Tyler on a surface level. The fans write their own ending, resurrecting Robert Paulson and rescuing everyone from the bunker. The Rize or Die members join the fans in an effort to save the rest of Tyler's followers. Palahniuk and Tyler walk on a beach, and Palahniuk laments the integrity of stories and art. Tyler asks what happens next, and Palahniuk describes that in a fictional Fight Club 3, Marla is pregnant once again by Tyler, and will have an abortion. Tyler shoots Palahniuk in the head, happily proclaiming he's going to be a father.

=== Collection ===
| Format | Collects | Published | ISBN |
|---|---|---|---|
| Hardcover | Fight Club 2 #1–10 | May 18, 2016 (Comic book stores); May 31, 2016 (Book stores) | ISBN 9781616559458 |

== Sequel ==
On the Orbital In Conversation podcast, Palahniuk stated that he was already working on Fight Club 3, which would also be in comic form. He also confirmed that he was working on a series of original short stories for comics which would appear as one-shots before eventually being collected into a single book.

Fight Club 3 consisted of twelve issues. The first issue was released on January 30, 2019.
