= Fight Club =

1999 American film by David Fincher

- Theatrical release poster
- Directed by: David Fincher
- Screenplay by: Jim Uhls
- Based on: Fight Club by Chuck Palahniuk
- Produced by: Art Linson; Ceán Chaffin; Ross Grayson Bell
- Starring: Brad Pitt; Edward Norton; Helena Bonham Carter
- Cinematography: Jeff Cronenweth
- Edited by: James Haygood
- Music by: The Dust Brothers
- Production companies: Fox 2000 Pictures; Regency Enterprises; Linson Films
- Distributed by: 20th Century Fox
- Release dates: September 10, 1999 (Venice); October 15, 1999 (United States)
- Running time: 139 minutes
- Country: United States (Note: Fight Club, a film by the American studio 20th Century Fox, is often found in databases and related summaries to have the countries US and Germany, the latter being ascribable to the role of international funding.)
- Language: English
- Budget: $63–65 million
- Box office: $102.4 million

Fight Club is a 1999 American film directed by David Fincher starring Brad Pitt, Edward Norton, and Helena Bonham Carter. It is based on the 1996 novel Fight Club by Chuck Palahniuk. Norton plays the unnamed narrator, who is discontented with his white-collar job. He forms a "fight club" with a soap salesman, Tyler Durden (Pitt) and becomes embroiled with an impoverished but beguiling woman, Marla Singer (Bonham Carter).

Palahniuk's novel was optioned by Fox 2000 Pictures producer Laura Ziskin, who hired Uhls to write the film adaptation. Fincher was selected because of his enthusiasm for the story. He developed the script with Uhls and sought screenwriting advice from the cast and others in the film industry. It was filmed in and around Los Angeles from July to December 1998. He and the cast compared the film to Rebel Without a Cause (1955) and The Graduate (1967), with a theme of conflict between Generation X and the value system of advertising.

Studio executives did not like the film and restructured Fincher's intended marketing campaign to try to reduce anticipated losses. Fight Club premiered at the 56th Venice International Film Festival on September 10, 1999, and was released in the United States on October 15, 1999, by 20th Century Fox. The film failed to meet the studio's expectations at the box office and polarized critics. It was ranked as one of the most controversial and talked-about films of the 1990s. However, Fight Club later found commercial success with its home video release, establishing it as a cult classic and causing media to revisit the film. In 2009, on its tenth anniversary, The New York Times dubbed it the "defining cult movie of our time".

== Plot ==
The unnamed Narrator works an office job as an insurance claims adjuster. He sees a doctor for his disordered sleep, complaining that he falls asleep unexpectedly and wakes up in unfamiliar places. The doctor suggests he attend a testicular cancer support group to see what actual pain looks like. The Narrator does so, and finds that the honesty and vulnerability he experiences there improve his sleep. He begins attending other support groups and encounters Marla Singer, another impostor, whose presence unnerves him. After a confrontation, the two agree to split the groups they attend.

The Narrator meets luxury soap salesman Tyler Durden on a business flight. Upon returning home, the Narrator finds his apartment destroyed in an explosion, and calls Tyler. They meet at a bar, where Tyler criticizes the Narrator's consumerist lifestyle and mocks him for not directly asking for a place to stay. Tyler agrees the Narrator can stay with him, but first asks a favor: for the Narrator to punch him as hard as he can. The Narrator does so, instigating an agreeable exchange of painful blows. They start an underground "Fight Club" at the bar, as a way for men to reclaim control of their lives.

Tyler saves Marla from an overdose, leading to a sexual relationship, while the Narrator remains cold to her. Tyler has the Narrator promise not to talk to Marla about him.

The Narrator's experiences at Fight Club transform him, and he grows increasingly disillusioned with his career. He extorts his boss by beating himself up in his boss's office, staging it as if the boss had assaulted him, and uses the hush money to expand Fight Club. He attracts new members, including his cancer support group friend, Robert "Bob" Paulsen. Tyler transforms the club into Project Mayhem, which commits increasingly destructive anti-capitalist acts. The Narrator confronts Tyler, who confesses to exploding the Narrator's apartment to free him from his consumerist lifestyle. They argue, then Tyler goes missing. When the police kill Bob during a Project Mayhem mission, the Narrator tries to dismantle Project Mayhem and discovers its nationwide reach.

Across several cities, the Narrator finds local chapters and asks if they have seen Tyler, but they give evasive and confusing answers until one member identifies the Narrator as Mr. Durden. The Narrator calls Marla to enquire about their relationship; she calls him Tyler. Once she hangs up, Tyler appears in the room with the Narrator and rebukes him for involving Marla. The Narrator realizes he and Tyler are the same person, with Tyler taking control during the Narrator's apparent narcolepsy.

The Narrator discovers Project Mayhem's ultimate objective: to erase all debt records by blowing up the skyscrapers of consumer credit companies. He warns Marla to stay away from him and goes to alert the police, but finds the officers are themselves Project Mayhem members. They attempt to castrate him on Tyler's orders. The Narrator escapes and disarms one of the bombs, prompting Tyler to attack him.

The Narrator reasons that Tyler's gun must be in his own hand, and finds that he is now holding it. He shoots himself in the cheek, "killing" Tyler but leaving the Narrator alive. He and Marla hold hands and watch the skyline as buildings collapse.

== Cast ==
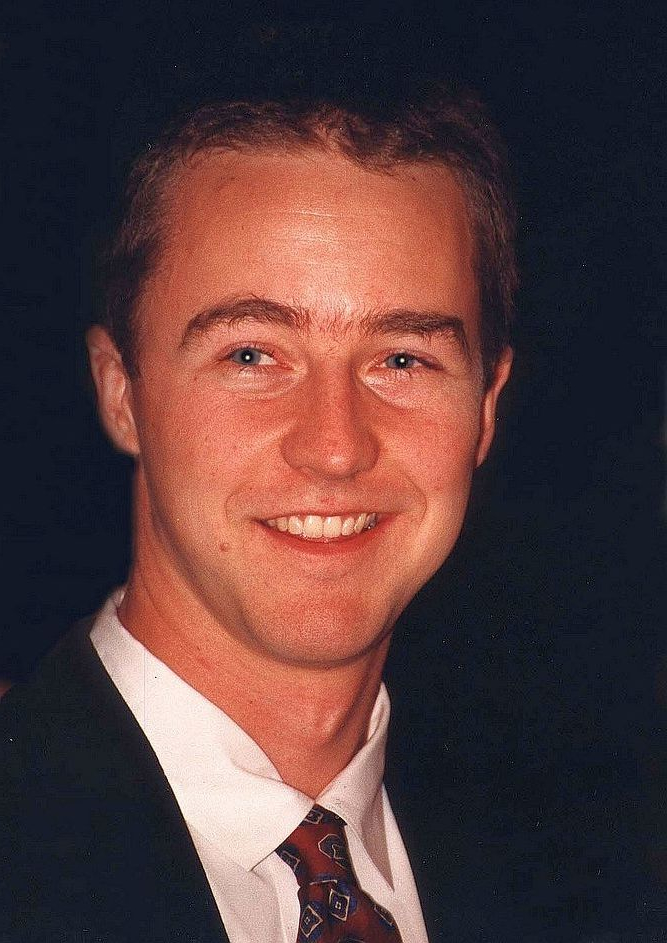
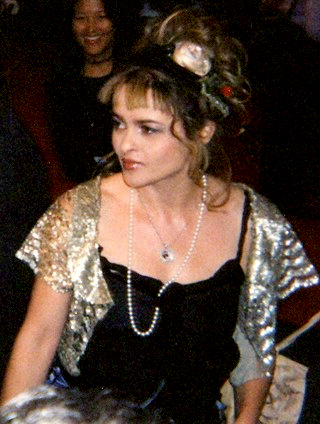
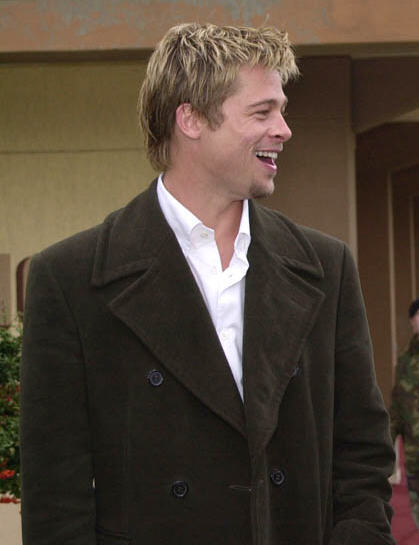
Edward Norton (left) in 1997, Helena Bonham Carter (center) in 2005 and Brad Pitt (right) in 2001
- Brad Pitt as Tyler Durden, a charismatic soap salesman who forms Fight Club with the narrator.
- Edward Norton as the unnamed narrator, an insomniac automobile recall specialist dissatisfied with his consumerist lifestyle.
- Helena Bonham Carter as Marla Singer, a woman who attends support groups and becomes involved with the narrator and Tyler
- Meat Loaf Aday as Robert "Bob" Paulsen, a former bodybuilder whom the narrator meets at a support group
- Jared Leto as Angel Face, a young member of Fight Club and Project Mayhem
- Holt McCallany as the Mechanic, a loyal member of Fight Club and Project Mayhem
- Zach Grenier as Richard Chesler, the narrator's supervisor at the automobile company
- Eion Bailey as Ricky, a young recruit of Fight Club and Project Mayhem
- Peter Iacangelo as Lou, the owner of the bar where Fight Club meets
- Thom Gossom Jr. as Detective Stern, a police detective investigating Project Mayhem

== Themes ==
We're designed to be hunters and we're in a society of shopping. There's nothing to kill anymore, there's nothing to fight, nothing to overcome, nothing to explore. In that societal emasculation this everyman [the Narrator] is created.

— David Fincher

Fincher said Fight Club was a coming of age film, like the 1967 film The Graduate but for people in their 30s. Fincher described the Narrator as an "everyman"; the character is identified in the script as "Jack", but left unnamed in the film. Fincher outlined the Narrator's background, "He's tried to do everything he was taught to do, tried to fit into the world by becoming the thing he isn't." He cannot find happiness, so he travels on a path to enlightenment in which he must "kill" his parents, god and teacher. By the start of the film, he has "killed off" his parents. With Tyler Durden, he kills his god by doing things they are not supposed to do. To complete the process of maturing, the Narrator has to kill his teacher, Tyler Durden.

The character is a 1990s inverse of the Graduate archetype: "a guy who does not have a world of possibilities in front of him, he has no possibilities, he literally cannot imagine a way to change his life." He is confused and angry, so he responds to his environment by creating Tyler Durden, a Nietzschean Übermensch, in his mind. While Tyler is who the Narrator wants to be, he is not empathetic and does not help the Narrator face decisions in his life "that are complicated and have moral and ethical implications". Fincher explained, "[Tyler] can deal with the concepts of our lives in an idealistic fashion, but it doesn't have anything to do with the compromises of real life as modern man knows it. Which is: you're not really necessary to a lot of what's going on. It's built, it just needs to run now." While studio executives worried that Fight Club was going to be "sinister and seditious", Fincher sought to make it "funny and seditious" by including humor to temper the sinister element.

Screenwriter Jim Uhls described the film as a romantic comedy, explaining, "It has to do with the characters' attitudes toward a healthy relationship, which is a lot of behavior which seems unhealthy and harsh to each other, but in fact does work for them—because both characters are out on the edge psychologically." The Narrator seeks intimacy, but avoids it with Marla Singer, seeing too much of himself in her. While Marla is a seductive and negativist prospect for the Narrator, he embraces the novelty and excitement that comes with befriending Tyler. The Narrator is comfortable being personally connected to Tyler, but becomes jealous when Tyler becomes sexually involved with Marla. When the Narrator argues with Tyler about their friendship, Tyler tells him that being friends is secondary to pursuing the philosophy they have been exploring. When Tyler implies that Marla is a risk they should remove, the Narrator realizes he should have focused on her and begins to diverge from Tyler's path.

We decided early on that I would start to starve myself as the film went on, while [Brad Pitt] would lift and go to tanning beds; he would become more and more idealized as I wasted away.

— Edward Norton

The Narrator, an unreliable narrator, is not immediately aware that he is mentally projecting Tyler. He also mistakenly promotes the fight clubs as a way to feel powerful, though the Narrator's physical condition worsens while Tyler Durden's appearance improves. While Tyler desires "real experiences" of actual fights like the Narrator at first, he manifests a nihilistic attitude of rejecting and destroying institutions and value systems. His impulsive nature, representing the id, is seductive and liberating to the Narrator and the members of Project Mayhem. Tyler's initiatives and methods become dehumanizing; he orders around the members of Project Mayhem with a megaphone similar to camp directors at Chinese re-education camps. The Narrator pulls back from Tyler and arrives at a middle ground between his conflicting selves.

Fight Club examines Generation X angst as "the middle children of history". Norton said it examines the value conflicts of Generation X as the first generation raised on television: this generation had "its value system largely dictated to it by advertising culture" and was told one could achieve "spiritual happiness through home furnishing". His character walks through his apartment while visual effects identify his many IKEA possessions. Fincher described the Narrator's immersion, "It was just the idea of living in this fraudulent idea of happiness." Pitt said, "Fight Club is a metaphor for the need to push through the walls we put around ourselves and just go for it, so for the first time we can experience the pain."

Fight Club also parallels the 1955 film Rebel Without a Cause; both probe the frustrations of the people in the system. The characters, having undergone societal emasculation, are reduced to "a generation of spectators". A culture of advertising defines society's "external signifiers of happiness", causing an unnecessary chase for material goods that replaces the more essential pursuit of spiritual happiness. The film references consumer products such as Gucci, Calvin Klein and the Volkswagen New Beetle. Norton said of the Beetle, "We smash it ... because it seemed like the classic example of a Baby Boomer generation marketing plan that sold culture back to us." Pitt explained the dissonance, "I think there's a self-defense mechanism that keeps my generation from having any real honest connection or commitment with our true feelings. We're rooting for ball teams, but we're not getting in there to play. We're so concerned with failure and success—like these two things are all that's going to sum you up at the end."

The violence of the fight clubs serves not to promote or glorify combat, but for participants to experience feeling in a society where they are otherwise numb. The fights represent a resistance to the impulse to be "cocooned" in society. Norton believed the fighting strips away the "fear of pain" and "the reliance on material signifiers of their self-worth", leaving them to experience something valuable. When the fights evolve into revolutionary violence, the film only half-accepts the revolutionary dialectic by Tyler Durden; the Narrator pulls back and rejects Durden's ideas. Fight Club purposely shapes an ambiguous message whose interpretation is left to the audience. Fincher said, "I love this idea that you can have fascism without offering any direction or solution. Isn't the point of fascism to say, 'This is the way we should be going'? But this movie couldn't be further from offering any kind of solution."

== Production ==
=== Development ===
The novel Fight Club by Chuck Palahniuk was published in 1996. Before its publication, a Fox Searchlight Pictures book scout sent a galley proof of the novel to creative executive Kevin McCormick. The executive assigned a studio reader to review the proof as a candidate for a film adaptation, but the reader discouraged it. McCormick then forwarded the proof to producers Lawrence Bender and Art Linson, who also rejected it. Producers Josh Donen and Ross Bell saw potential and expressed interest. They arranged unpaid screen readings with actors to determine the script's length and an initial reading lasted six hours. The producers cut out sections to reduce the running time and they used the shorter script to record its dialogue. Bell sent the recording to Laura Ziskin, head of the division Fox 2000 Pictures, who listened to the tape and purchased the rights to Fight Club from Palahniuk for $10,000.

Ziskin initially considered hiring Buck Henry to write the adaptation, finding Fight Club similar to the 1967 film The Graduate, which Henry had adapted. When a new screenwriter, Jim Uhls, lobbied Donen and Bell for the job, the producers chose him over Henry. Bell contacted four directors to direct the film. He considered Peter Jackson the best choice, but Jackson was too busy filming the 1996 film The Frighteners in New Zealand. Bryan Singer received the book but did not read it. Danny Boyle met with Bell and read the book, but he pursued another film. The book was also sent to David O. Russell, but he couldn't understand it. David Fincher, who had read Fight Club and had tried to buy the rights himself, talked with Ziskin about directing the film. He hesitated to accept the assignment with 20th Century Fox at first because he had an unpleasant experience directing the 1992 film Alien 3 for Fox. To repair his relationship with Fox, he met with Ziskin and studio head Bill Mechanic. In August 1997, Fox announced that Fincher would direct the film adaptation of Fight Club. The script initially had no narration, but Fincher found it "sad and pathetic", so it was rewritten to have narration.

=== Casting ===
Producer Ross Bell met with actor Russell Crowe to discuss his candidacy for the role of Tyler Durden. Producer Art Linson, who joined the project late, met with Brad Pitt regarding the same role. Linson was the senior producer of the two, so the studio sought to cast Pitt instead of Crowe. Pitt was looking for a new film after the domestic failure of his 1998 film Meet Joe Black and the studio believed Fight Club would be more commercially successful with a major star. The studio signed Pitt for US$17.5 million.

For the role of the unnamed Narrator, the studio desired a "sexier marquee name" such as Matt Damon to increase the film's commercial prospects; it also considered Sean Penn. Fincher instead considered Edward Norton based on his performance in the 1996 film The People vs. Larry Flynt. Following his Academy Award nomination, other studios were approaching Norton for leading roles in developing films, and he was cast in Runaway Jury. However, the film did not reach production after director Joel Schumacher dropped out in July 1997. 20th Century Fox offered Norton $2.5 million for Fight Club, but he could not accept the offer immediately because he still owed Paramount Pictures a film. He had signed a contractual obligation with Paramount to appear in one of the studio's future films for a smaller salary. Norton later satisfied the obligation with his role in the 2003 film The Italian Job.

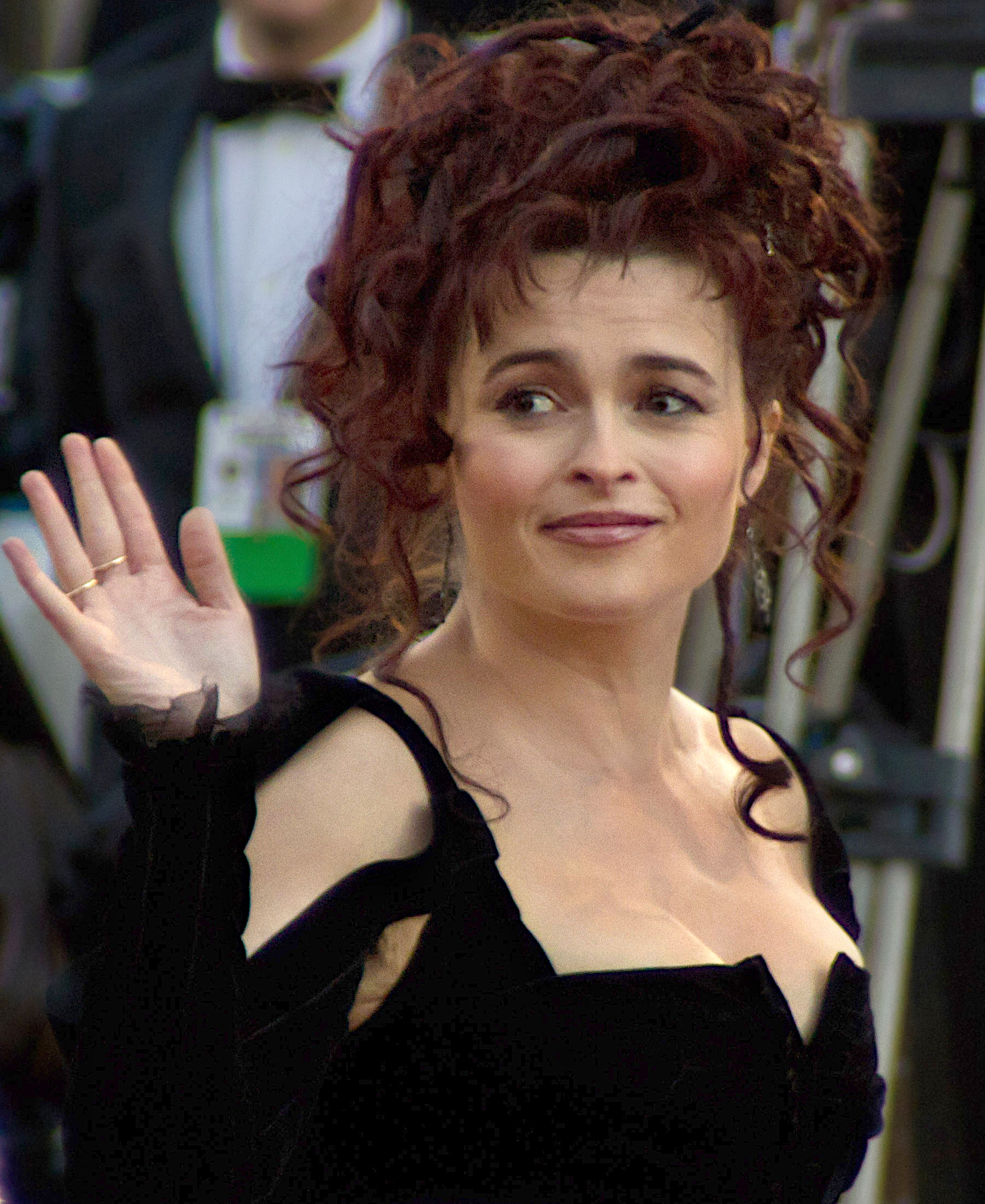
Helena Bonham Carter, pictured in 2011

In January 1998, 20th Century Fox announced that Pitt and Norton had been cast. The actors prepared by taking lessons in boxing, taekwondo, grappling, and soapmaking. Pitt voluntarily visited a dentist to have pieces of his front teeth chipped off so his character would not have perfect teeth. The pieces were restored after filming concluded.

Fincher's first choice for the role of Marla Singer was Janeane Garofalo. While Fincher initially stated that she turned it down because she objected to the film's sexual content, in an interview in 2020, Garofalo revealed that she did accept the role, but was dropped because Norton believed she was poorly suited to it. Fincher pitched the role to Julia Louis-Dreyfus. The filmmakers considered Courtney Love and Winona Ryder as early candidates. Love claimed that she was cast as Marla Singer, but was fired after she rejected Pitt's pitch for a film about her late husband, Kurt Cobain. The studio wanted to cast Reese Witherspoon, but Fincher felt she was too young. Sarah Michelle Gellar turned the role down due to scheduling conflicts with Buffy the Vampire Slayer. Finally, Fincher chose to cast Helena Bonham Carter based on her performance in the 1997 film The Wings of the Dove.

=== Writing ===
When Uhls first encountered the novel, it was in the form of a manuscript, though it already had a publisher. In his interview he stated that he read it just for enjoyment and was blown away by it. He started working on a draft of the adapted screenplay, which excluded a voice-over because the industry perceived the technique as "hackneyed and trite" at the time. When Fincher joined the film, he thought that the film should have a voice-over, believing that the film's humor came from the Narrator's voice. He described the film without a voice-over as seemingly "sad and pathetic". Fincher and Uhls revised the script for six to seven months and by 1997 had a third draft that reordered the story and left out several major elements. When Pitt was cast, he was concerned that his character, Tyler Durden, was too one-dimensional. Fincher sought the advice of writer-director Cameron Crowe, who suggested giving the character more ambiguity. Fincher also hired screenwriter Andrew Kevin Walker for assistance. He invited Pitt and Norton to help revise the script and the group drafted five revisions in the course of a year.

Palahniuk praised the faithful film adaptation of his novel and applauded how the film's plot was more streamlined than the book's. Palahniuk recalled how the writers debated if film audiences would believe the plot twist from the novel. Fincher supported including the twist, arguing, "If they accept everything up to this point, they'll accept the plot twist. If they're still in the theater, they'll stay with it." Palahniuk's novel also contained homoerotic overtones, which Fincher included in the film to make audiences uncomfortable and accentuate the surprise of the twists. The bathroom scene where Tyler Durden bathes next to the Narrator is an example of the overtones; the line, "I'm wondering if another woman is really the answer we need," was meant to suggest personal responsibility rather than homosexuality. Another example is the scene at the beginning of the film in which Tyler Durden puts a gun barrel down the Narrator's mouth.

The Narrator finds redemption at the end of the film by rejecting Tyler Durden's dialectic, a path that diverged from the novel's ending in which the Narrator is placed in a mental institution. Norton drew parallels between redemption in the film and redemption in The Graduate, indicating that the protagonists of both films find a middle ground between two divisions of self. Fincher considered the novel too infatuated with Tyler Durden and changed the ending to move away from him, "I wanted people to love Tyler, but I also wanted them to be OK with his vanquishing."

=== Filming ===
Studio executives Mechanic and Ziskin planned an initial budget of $23 million to finance the film, but by the start of production, the budget was increased to $50 million. Half was paid by New Regency, but during filming, the projected budget escalated to $67 million. New Regency's head and Fight Club executive producer Arnon Milchan petitioned Fincher to reduce costs by at least $5 million. Fincher refused, so Milchan threatened Mechanic that New Regency would withdraw financing. Mechanic sought to restore Milchan's support by sending him tapes of dailies from Fight Club. After seeing three weeks of filming, Milchan reinstated New Regency's financial backing. The final production budget was $63–65 million.

The fight scenes were heavily choreographed, but the actors were required to "go full out" to capture realistic effects such as having the wind knocked out of them. Makeup artist Julie Pearce, who had worked for Fincher on the 1997 film The Game, studied mixed martial arts and pay-per-view boxing to portray the fighters accurately. She designed an extra's ear to have cartilage missing, inspired by the boxing match in which Mike Tyson bit off part of Evander Holyfield's ear. Makeup artists devised two methods to create sweat on cue: spraying mineral water over a coat of Vaseline and using the unadulterated water for "wet sweat". Meat Loaf, who plays a fight club member who has "bitch tits", wore a 90-pound (40 kg) fat harness that gave him large breasts. He also wore eight-inch (20 cm) lifts in his scenes with Norton to be taller than him.

Filming lasted 138 days from July to December 1998, during which Fincher shot more than 1,500 rolls of film, three times the average for a Hollywood film. The locations were in and around Los Angeles and on sets built at the studio in Century City. Production designer Alex McDowell constructed more than 70 sets. The exterior of Tyler Durden's house was built in Wilmington, California, while the interior was built on a sound stage at the studio's location. The interior was given a decayed look to illustrate the deconstructed world of the characters. Marla Singer's apartment was based on photographs of apartments in downtown LA. Overall, production included 300 scenes, 200 locations and complex special effects. Fincher compared Fight Club to his subsequent, less complex film Panic Room, "I felt like I was spending all my time watching trucks being loaded and unloaded so I could shoot three lines of dialogue. There was far too much transportation going on."

=== Cinematography ===
Fincher used the Super 35 format to film Fight Club since it gave him maximum flexibility to compose shots. He hired Jeff Cronenweth as cinematographer; Cronenweth's father Jordan Cronenweth had been cinematographer for Fincher's 1992 film Alien 3, but left midway through production due to Parkinson's disease. Fincher explored visual styles in his previous films Seven and The Game and he and Cronenweth drew elements from these styles for Fight Club.

Fincher and Cronenweth applied a lurid style, choosing to make people "sort of shiny". The appearance of the Narrator's scenes without Tyler were bland and realistic. The scenes with Tyler were described by Fincher as "more hyper-real in a torn-down, deconstructed sense—a visual metaphor of what [the Narrator is] heading into". The filmmakers used heavily desaturated colors in the costuming, makeup and art direction. Bonham Carter wore opalescent makeup to portray her romantic nihilistic character with a "smack-fiend patina". Fincher and Cronenweth drew influences from the 1973 film American Graffiti, which applied a mundane look to nighttime exteriors while simultaneously including a variety of colors.

The crew took advantage of both natural and practical light. Fincher sought various approaches to the lighting setups; for example, he chose several urban locations for the city lights' effects on the shots' backgrounds. The crew also embraced fluorescent lighting at other practical locations to maintain an element of reality and to light the prostheses depicting the characters' injuries. On the other hand, Fincher also ensured that scenes were not so strongly lit so the characters' eyes were less visible, citing cinematographer Gordon Willis' technique as the influence.

Fight Club was filmed mostly at night and Fincher filmed the daytime shots in shadowed locations. The crew equipped the bar's basement with inexpensive work lamps to create a background glow. Fincher avoided stylish camerawork when filming early fight scenes in the basement and instead placed the camera in a fixed position. In later fight scenes, Fincher moved the camera from the viewpoint of a distant observer to that of the fighter.

The scenes with Tyler were staged to conceal that the character was a mental projection of the unnamed Narrator. Tyler was not filmed in two shots with a group of people, nor was he shown in any over-the-shoulder shots in scenes where Tyler gives the Narrator specific ideas to manipulate him. In scenes before the Narrator meets Tyler, the filmmakers inserted Tyler's presence in single frames for subliminal effect. Tyler appears in the background and out of focus, like a "little devil on the shoulder". Fincher explained the subliminal frames, "Our hero is creating Tyler Durden in his own mind, so at this point he exists only on the periphery of the Narrator's consciousness."

While Cronenweth generally rated and exposed the Kodak film stock normally on Fight Club, several other techniques were applied to change its appearance. Flashing was implemented on much of the exterior night photography, the contrast was stretched to be purposely ugly, the print was adjusted to be underexposed, Technicolor's ENR silver retention was used on a select number of prints to increase the density of the blacks and high-contrast print stocks were chosen to create a "stepped-on" look on the print with a dirty patina.

=== Visual effects ===
Fincher hired visual effects supervisor Kevin Tod Haug, who worked for him on The Game, to create visual effects for Fight Club. Haug assigned the visual effects artists and experts to different facilities that each addressed different types of visual effects: CG modeling, animation, compositing and scanning. Haug explained, "We selected the best people for each aspect of the effects work, then coordinated their efforts. In this way, we never had to play to a facility's weakness." Fincher visualized the Narrator's perspective through a "mind's eye" view and structured a myopic framework for the film audiences. Fincher also used previsualized footage of challenging main-unit and visual effects shots as a problem-solving tool to avoid making mistakes during the actual filming.

The opening scene in Fight Club that represents a brain's neural network in which the thought processes are initiated by the Narrator's fear impulse. The network was mapped using an L-system and drawn out by a medical illustrator.

The film's title sequence is a 90-second visual effects composition that depicts the inside of the Narrator's brain at a microscopic level; the camera pulls back to the outside, starting at his fear center and following the thought processes initiated by his fear impulse. The sequence, designed in part by Fincher, was budgeted separately from the rest of the film at first, but the sequence was awarded by the studio in January 1999. Fincher hired Digital Domain and its visual effects supervisor Kevin Mack, who won an Academy Award for Visual Effects for the 1998 film What Dreams May Come, for the sequence. The company mapped the computer-generated brain using an L-system, and the design was detailed using renderings by medical illustrator Katherine Jones. The pullback sequence from within the brain to the outside of the skull included neurons, action potentials and a hair follicle. Haug explained the artistic license that Fincher took with the shot, "While he wanted to keep the brain passage looking like electron microscope photography, that look had to be coupled with the feel of a night dive—wet, scary and with a low depth of field." The shallow depth of field was accomplished with the ray tracing process.

Other visual effects include an early scene in which the camera flashes past city streets to survey Project Mayhem's destructive equipment lying in underground parking lots; the sequence was a three-dimensional composition of nearly 100 photographs of Los Angeles and Century City by photographer Michael Douglas Middleton. The final scene of the demolition of the credit card office buildings was designed by Richard Baily of Image Savant; Baily worked on the scene for over fourteen months.

Midway through the film, Tyler Durden points out the cue mark—nicknamed "cigarette burn" in the film—to the audience. The scene represents a turning point that foreshadows the coming rupture and inversion of the "fairly subjective reality" that existed earlier in the film. Fincher explained, "Suddenly it's as though the projectionist missed the changeover, the viewers have to start looking at the movie in a whole new way."

=== Score ===
Fincher was concerned that bands experienced in writing film scores would be unable to tie the themes together, so he sought a band which had never recorded for film. He pursued Radiohead, but the singer, Thom Yorke, declined as he was recovering from the stress of promoting their 1997 album OK Computer. Fincher instead commissioned the breakbeat producing duo Dust Brothers, who created a post-modern score encompassing drum loops, electronic scratches and computerized samples. Dust Brothers performer Michael Simpson explained the setup, "Fincher wanted to break new ground with everything about the movie and a nontraditional score helped achieve that." The climax and end credits feature the song "Where Is My Mind?" by Pixies.

== Release ==
=== Marketing ===
Filming concluded in December 1998 and Fincher edited the footage in early 1999 to prepare Fight Club for a screening with senior executives. They did not receive the film positively and were concerned that there would not be an audience for the film. Executive producer Art Linson, who supported the film, recalled the response, "So many incidences of Fight Club were alarming, no group of executives could narrow them down." Nevertheless, Fight Club was originally slated to be released in July 1999, but was later changed to August 6, 1999. The studio further delayed the film's release, this time to autumn, citing a crowded summer schedule and a hurried post-production process. Outsiders attributed the delays to the Columbine High School massacre earlier in the year.

Marketing executives at Fox Searchlight Pictures faced difficulties in marketing Fight Club and at one point considered marketing it as an art film. They considered that the film was primarily geared toward male audiences because of its violence and believed that not even Pitt would attract female filmgoers. Research testing showed that the film appealed to teenagers. Fincher refused to let the posters and trailers focus on Pitt and encouraged the studio to hire the advertising firm Wieden+Kennedy to devise a marketing plan. The firm proposed a bar of pink soap with the title "Fight Club" embossed on it as the film's main marketing image; the proposal was considered "a bad joke" by Fox executives. Fincher also released two early trailers in the form of fake public service announcements presented by Pitt and Norton; the studio did not think the trailers marketed the film appropriately. Instead, the studio financed a $20 million large-scale campaign to provide a press junket, posters, billboards and trailers for TV that highlighted the film's fight scenes. The studio advertised Fight Club on cable during World Wrestling Federation broadcasts, which Fincher protested, believing that the placement created the wrong context for the film. Linson believed that the "ill-conceived one-dimensional" marketing by marketing executive Robert Harper largely contributed to Fight Club's lukewarm box office performance in the United States.

=== Theatrical run ===
The studio held Fight Club's world premiere at the 56th Venice International Film Festival on September 10, 1999. For the American theatrical release, the studio hired the National Research Group to test screen the film; the group predicted the film would gross between US$13 million and US$15 million in its opening weekend. Fight Club opened commercially in the United States and Canada on October 15, 1999, and earned US$11 million in 1,963 theaters over the opening weekend. The film ranked first at the weekend box office, beating Double Jeopardy and The Story of Us, a fellow weekend opener. Audiences polled by CinemaScore gave the film an average grade of "B−" on an A+ to F scale. The gender mix of audiences for Fight Club, argued to be "the ultimate anti-date flick", was 61% male and 39% female; 58% of audiences were below the age of 21. Despite the film's top placement, its opening gross fell short of the studio's expectations. Over the second weekend, Fight Club dropped 42.6% in revenue, earning US$6.3 million. In its original theatrical run, the film grossed US$37 million in the United States and Canada and US$63.8 million in other territories, for a worldwide total of US$100.9 million. (With subsequent re-releases, the film's worldwide gross increased to $102 million.) The underwhelming North American performance of Fight Club soured the relationship between 20th Century Fox's studio head Bill Mechanic and media executive Rupert Murdoch, which contributed to Mechanic's resignation in June 2000.

The British Board of Film Classification reviewed Fight Club for its November 12, 1999, release in the United Kingdom and removed two scenes involving "an indulgence in the excitement of beating a (defenseless) man's face into a pulp". The board assigned the film an 18 certificate, limiting the release to adult-only audiences in the UK. The BBFC did not censor any further, considering and dismissing claims that Fight Club contained "dangerously instructive information" and could "encourage anti-social (behavior)". The board decided, "The film as a whole is—quite clearly—critical and sharply parodic of the amateur fascism which in part it portrays. Its central theme of male machismo (and the anti-social behaviour that flows from it) is emphatically rejected by the central character in the concluding reels." The scenes were restored in a two-disc DVD edition released in the UK in March 2007. In February 2024, in advance of a theatrical re-release, the BBFC lowered the classification from 18 to 15.

=== Home media ===
Fincher supervised the composition of the DVD packaging and was one of the first directors to participate in a film's transition to home media. The film was released on DVD on June 6, 2000, in both one and two-disc editions. The movie disc included four commentary tracks, while the bonus disc contained behind-the-scenes clips, deleted scenes, trailers, theater safety PSAs, the promotional music video "This is Your Life", Internet spots, still galleries, cast biographies, storyboards and publicity materials. Fincher worked on the DVD as a way to finish his vision for the film. Julie Markell, 20th Century Fox's senior vice president of creative development, said the DVD packaging complemented Fincher's vision, "The film is meant to make you question. The package, by extension, tries to reflect an experience that you must experience for yourself. The more you look at it, the more you'll get out of it." The studio developed the packaging for two months. The two-disc special edition DVD was packaged to look covered in brown cardboard wrapper. The title "Fight Club" was labeled diagonally across the front and packaging appeared tied with twine. Markell said, "We wanted the package to be simple on the outside, so that there would be a dichotomy between the simplicity of brown paper wrapping and the intensity and chaos of what's inside." Deborah Mitchell, 20th Century Fox's vice president of marketing, described the design, "From a retail standpoint, [the DVD case] has incredible shelf-presence." It was the first DVD release to feature the THX Optimode.

Fight Club won the 2000 Online Film Critics Society Awards for Best DVD, Best DVD Commentary and Best DVD Special Features. Entertainment Weekly ranked the film's two-disc edition in first place on its 2001 list of "The 50 Essential DVDs", giving top ratings to the DVD's content and technical picture-and-audio quality. When the two-disc edition went out of print, the studio re-released it in 2004 because of fans' requests. The film sold more than 6 million copies on DVD and video within the first ten years, making it one of the largest-selling home media items in the studio's history, in addition to grossing over $55 million in video and DVD rentals. With a weak box office performance in the United States and Canada, a better performance in other territories and the highly successful DVD release, Fight Club generated a US$10 million profit for the studio.

Fight Club was released on Blu-ray in the United States on November 17, 2009. Five graffiti artists were commissioned to create 30 pieces of art for the packaging, encompassing urban aesthetics found on the East Coast and West Coast of the United States as well as influences from European street art. The Blu-ray edition opens with a menu screen for the romantic comedy Never Been Kissed starring Drew Barrymore before leading into the Fight Club menu screen; Fincher got permission from Barrymore to include the fake menu screen.

An online release in China from Tencent censored the bomb blasts at the end and replaced the ending with a message that Project Mayhem was thwarted, with Tyler Durden being arrested by law enforcement and placed in an insane asylum until 2012, adapting the ending of the original Fight Club novel. Weeks later, Tencent released a version of the film restoring 11 of the 12 minutes that had previously been cut. The novel's author Chuck Palahniuk believed the censored version partially restored the book's ending.

For the film's 25th anniversary in October 2024, it was announced that Fincher was working on a 4K remaster of the film. After two years of restoration, the 4K remaster was screened in theaters for a one-night event on April 22, 2026, followed by an Ultra HD Blu-ray and digital release from 20th Century Studios on May 22. Fincher made alterations to the 4K remaster such as removing blemishes from Bonham Carter's face, adding lens flares and background lights, removing reflections, and changes to color timing, which drew criticism from fans and reviewers.

== Critical reception ==
Cineaste's Gary Crowdus summarized the critical reception at the time, "Many critics praised Fight Club, hailing it as one of the most exciting, original and thought-provoking films of the year." He wrote of the negative opinion, "While Fight Club had numerous critical champions, the film's critical attackers were far more vocal, a negative chorus which became hysterical about what they felt to be the excessively graphic scenes of fisticuffs ... They felt such scenes served only as a mindless glamorization of brutality, a morally irresponsible portrayal, which they feared might encourage impressionable young male viewers to set up their own real-life fight clubs in order to beat each other senseless." When Fight Club premiered at the 56th Venice International Film Festival, the film was fiercely debated by critics. A newspaper reported, "Many loved and hated it in equal measures." Some critics expressed concern that the film would incite copycat behavior, such as that seen after A Clockwork Orange debuted in Britain nearly three decades previously. Upon the film's theatrical release, The Times reported the reaction, "It touched a nerve in the male psyche that was debated in newspapers across the world." Although the film's makers called Fight Club "an accurate portrayal of men in the 1990s," some critics called it "irresponsible and appalling." Writing for The Australian, Christopher Goodwin stated, "Fight Club is shaping up to be the most contentious mainstream Hollywood meditation on violence since Stanley Kubrick's A Clockwork Orange."

Janet Maslin, reviewing for The New York Times, praised Fincher's direction and editing of the film. She wrote that Fight Club carried a message of "contemporary manhood" and that, if not watched closely, the film could be misconstrued as an endorsement of violence and nihilism. Roger Ebert, reviewing for the Chicago Sun-Times, gave Fight Club two stars out of four, calling it "visceral and hard-edged", but also "a thrill ride masquerading as philosophy," whose promising first act is followed by a second that panders to macho sensibilities and a third he dismissed as "trickery." Ebert later acknowledged that the film was "beloved by most, not by me". He was later requested to have a shot-by-shot analysis of Fight Club at the Conference on World Affairs; he stated that "[s]eeing it over the course of a week, I admired its skill even more and its thought even less." Jay Carr of The Boston Globe opined that the film began with an "invigoratingly nervy and imaginative buzz", but that it eventually became "explosively silly."

Newsweek's David Ansen described Fight Club as "an outrageous mixture of brilliant technique, puerile philosophizing, trenchant satire and sensory overload" and thought that the ending was too pretentious. Richard Schickel of Time described the mise en scène as dark and damp: "It enforces the contrast between the sterilities of his characters' aboveground life and their underground one. Water, even when it's polluted, is the source of life; blood, even when it's carelessly spilled, is the symbol of life being fully lived. To put his point simply: it's better to be wet than dry." Schickel applauded the performances of Pitt and Norton, but criticized the "conventionally gimmicky" unfolding and the failure to make Bonham Carter's character interesting. In Alexander Walker's highly critical review for the London Evening Standard with the headline "A Nazi piece of work", he claimed that the story was "a paradigm of the Hitler state". Two quotes from his review ("It is an inadmissable assault on personal decency. And on society itself." and "It echoes propaganda that gave licence to the brutal activities of the SA and the SS. It resurrects the Fuhrer principle.") were among several negative critical opinions included in the booklet accompanying the 2000 DVD release.

The film review website Metacritic surveyed 36 critics and assessed 24 reviews as positive, 10 as mixed and 2 as negative. It gave an aggregate score of 67 out of 100, which it said indicated "generally favorable" reviews. The similar website Rotten Tomatoes surveyed 247 critics. It gave the film a score of 81% and summarized the critical consensus, "Solid acting, amazing direction and elaborate production design make Fight Club a wild ride."

== Accolades ==
Fight Club was nominated for the 2000 Academy Award for Best Sound Editing, but it lost to The Matrix. Bonham Carter won the 2000 Empire Award for Best British Actress. The Online Film Critics Society also nominated Fight Club for Best Film, Best Director, Best Actor (Norton), Best Editing and Best Adapted Screenplay (Uhls). Though the film won none of the awards, the organization listed Fight Club as one of the top ten films of 1999. The soundtrack was nominated for a BRIT Award, losing to Notting Hill.

== Legacy and cultural impact ==
Fight Club was one of the most controversial and talked-about films of the 1990s. The film was perceived as the forerunner of a new mood in American political life. Like other 1999 films Magnolia, Being John Malkovich and Three Kings, Fight Club was recognized as an innovator in cinematic form and style, since it exploited new developments in filmmaking technology. After Fight Club's theatrical release, it became more popular via word of mouth, and the positive reception of the DVD established it as a cult film that David Ansen of Newsweek conjectured would enjoy "perennial" fame. The film's success also heightened Palahniuk's profile to global renown.

Following Fight Club's release, several fight clubs were reported to have started in the United States. A "Gentleman's Fight Club" was started in Menlo Park, California, in 2000 and had members mostly from the tech industry. Teens and preteens in Texas, New Jersey, Washington state and Alaska also initiated fight clubs and posted videos of their fights online, leading authorities to break up the clubs. In 2006, an unwilling participant from a local high school was injured at a fight club in Arlington, Texas and the DVD sales of the fight led to the arrest of six teenagers. An unsanctioned fight club was also started at Princeton University, where matches were held on campus. The film was suspected of influencing Luke Helder, a college student who planted pipe bombs in mailboxes in 2002. Helder's goal was to create a smiley pattern on the map of the United States, similar to the scene in Fight Club in which a building is vandalized to have a smiley on its exterior. On July 16, 2009, a 17-year-old who had formed his own fight club in Manhattan was charged with detonating a homemade bomb outside a Starbucks Coffee shop on the Upper East Side. The New York City Police Department reported the suspect was trying to emulate "Project Mayhem".

Fight Club had a significant impact on evangelical Christianity, in the areas of Christian discipleship and masculinity. A number of churches called their cell groups "fight clubs" with a stated purpose of meeting regularly to "beat up the flesh and believe the gospel of grace". Some churches, especially Mars Hill Church in Seattle, whose pastor Mark Driscoll was obsessed with the film, picked up the film's emphasis on masculinity and rejection of self-care. Jessica Johnson suggests that Driscoll even called on "his brothers-in-arms to foment a movement not unlike Project Mayhem."

A Fight Club video game was released by Vivendi Universal Games in 2004 for the PlayStation 2, Xbox and for mobile phones. The game was a critical and commercial failure and was panned by such publications and websites as GameSpot, Game Informer and IGN. The video game Jet Set Radio, initially released in 2000 for Sega's Dreamcast console, was inspired by the film's anti-establishment themes.

In 2003, Fight Club was listed as one of the "50 Best Guy Movies of All Time" by Men's Journal. In 2004 and 2006, Fight Club was voted by Empire readers as the eighth and tenth greatest film of all time, respectively. Total Film ranked Fight Club as "The Greatest Film of our Lifetime" in 2007 during the magazine's tenth anniversary. In 2007, Premiere selected Tyler Durden's line, "The first rule of fight club is you do not talk about fight club," as the 27th greatest movie line of all time. In 2008, readers of Empire ranked Tyler Durden eighth on a list of the 100 Greatest Movie Characters. Empire also identified Fight Club as the 10th greatest movie of all time in its 2008 issue The 500 Greatest Movies of All Time.

In 2010, two viral mash-up videos featuring Fight Club were released. Ferris Club was a mash-up of Fight Club and the 1986 film Ferris Bueller's Day Off. It portrayed Ferris as Tyler Durden and Cameron as the Narrator, "claiming to see the real psychological truth behind the John Hughes classic". The second video, Jane Austen's Fight Club, also gained popularity online as a mash-up of Fight Club's fighting rules and the characters created by 19th-century novelist Jane Austen.

In a 2023 interview, Fincher expressed that he was appalled by some interpretations of the film by masculinists, stating: "The fact that it has been misinterpreted by people whose points of view I couldn't really imagine is alarming." He added that he "thought the movie was funny," and emphasized that both the novel and the film were "fairly obviously" a critique of the Nietzschean Übermensch as well as "a cautionary tale about what to do with the anger engendered by your disenfranchisement."

== See also ==
- List of American films of 1999
- List of cult films
- List of films that depict class struggle
- David Fincher filmography
- Brad Pitt filmography
