= Mina Bissell =

Iranian-American biologist

Mina J. Bissell
- Born: Tehran, Iran
- Education: Harvard Medical School, University of California, Berkeley
- Known for: cancer research
- Children: Yalda T. Uhls
- Awards: Ernest Orlando Lawrence Award, Guggenheim Fellowship
- Scientific career
- Fields: Biology

Mina J. Bissell is an Iranian-American biologist known for her research on breast cancer. In particular, she has studied the effects of a cell's microenvironment, including its extracellular matrix, on tissue function.

== Early life and education ==
Bissell was born in Tehran, Iran and brought up in an educated and wealthy family. By the time she graduated from high school, Bissell was the top graduate in her year in Iran.

A family friend, through the American Friends of Iran, encouraged Bissell to come to the United States. She enrolled at Bryn Mawr College, then transferred to Radcliffe College where she earned a bachelor's degree in chemistry. She obtained a PhD in bacteriology from Harvard Medical School (1969) and was awarded an American Cancer Society postdoctoral fellowship at the University of California, Berkeley.

== Career ==
She joined the Lawrence Berkeley Laboratory as a staff biochemist in 1972 and subsequently became a Senior Scientist, Director of Cell & Molecular Biology, Director of the Life Sciences Division, and Distinguished Scientist. In 1996, she received the Ernest Orlando Lawrence Award and medal, the highest scientific honor bestowed by the United States Department of Energy. A member of the American Academy of Arts and Sciences, the Institute of Medicine, and the American Philosophical Society, Bissell is a recipient of the Guggenheim Fellowship, the Mellon Award from the University of Pittsburgh, the Eli Lilly/Clowes Award of the American Association for Cancer Research, and the Medal of Honor from the American Cancer Society. She was elected to the National Academy of Sciences in 2010, one of the highest honors bestowed on working scientists. In 2016, the American Society for Cell Biology will bestow the E.B. Wilson Medal, its highest scientific honor, to Dr. Bissell for her work showing that physical context matters in cells and her demonstrations that the extracellular matrix (ECM) is integral to breast tissue remodeling and to breast cancer progression. In 2020 she received the Canada Gairdner International Award.

She is the former head of life sciences at Lawrence Berkeley Laboratory. Her work started over 30 years ago on the effect of tissue architecture and the role of the cellular microenvironment on cancer still has become increasingly influential in the field of cancer biology and cancer therapeutics. She is credited with the radical but increasingly accepted notion that phenotype can dominate over genotype in normal development and disease.

Bissell and her colleague, William Ole Peterson, have developed 3D culture in cancer research. They have shown non-tumorgenic (normal-like) mammary epithelial cells form monolayer spherical acini with hollow lumen and tumorgenic mammary epithelial cells form filled bowl irregular acini. She has published about 300 articles and book chapters.

In June 2012 she presented at the TED conference. On Cancer Day 2013, this talk was featured as the first talk in a series of ten talks about cancer presented by TED. Where she mainly focused on the idea that a cancer cell does not immediately form a tumor; instead, its growth and development are influenced by signals from the surrounding microenvironment.

Preceded by J. Michael Bishop	ASCB Presidents; 1997	Succeeded by Elizabeth Blackburn

== Personal life ==
Bissell is the mother of the developmental psychologist Yalda T. Uhls.
