= Fight Club 3 =

Comic book sequel

- Cover of Fight Club 3 #1

Publication information
- Publisher: Dark Horse Comics
- Schedule: Monthly
- Format: Mini-series
- Publication date: January – December 2019
- No. of issues: 12

Creative team
- Written by: Chuck Palahniuk
- Artist: Cameron Stewart

Fight Club 3 is a twelve-issue comic book limited series written by Chuck Palahniuk as the second sequel to his 1996 novel Fight Club, following the 2015 limited series Fight Club 2. The series, which is illustrated by Cameron Stewart, consists of twelve issues with the first issue being released on January 30, 2019.

== Premise ==
Marla Singer is about to deliver her second child. However, the father isn't her husband. Rather, the father is his alter ego Tyler Durden, who is very invested in his heir and the world he shall inherit. Marla, her first son, and her husband—the unnamed narrator in the novel, who now goes by Balthazar—live in a rundown motel with sketchy neighbors. In the Fight Club 2 graphic novel, Tyler transformed Project Mayhem into Rize or Die—now, as a road to paradise presents itself, a new group has implemented a ruthless and deviant plan to fine-tune mankind, leading Balthazar to forge an unlikely alliance with Tyler Durden.

== Publication ==
=== Issues ===
Title	Release date	Story	Art	Colors	Cover	Notes
Fight Club 3 #1	January 30, 2019	Chuck Palahniuk	Cameron Stewart	Dave McCaig	David Mack; Duncan Fegredo (variant); Kirbi Fagan (variant)	
Fight Club 3 #2	February 27, 2019	Chuck Palahniuk	Cameron Stewart	Dave McCaig	David Mack; Cameron Stewart (variant); Francesco Francavilla (variant)	
Fight Club 3 #3	March 27, 2019	Chuck Palahniuk	Cameron Stewart	Dave McCaig	David Mack; Colleen Coover (variant); Eric Wilkerson (variant)	
Fight Club 3 #4	April 24, 2019	Chuck Palahniuk	Cameron Stewart	Dave McCaig	David Mack; Duncan Fegredo (variant)	
Fight Club 3 #5	May 29, 2019	Chuck Palahniuk	Cameron Stewart	Dave McCaig	David Mack; Duncan Fegredo (variant)	
Fight Club 3 #6	June 26, 2019	Chuck Palahniuk	Cameron Stewart	Dave McCaig	David Mack; Kirbi Fagan (variant)	
Fight Club 3 #7	July 31, 2019	Chuck Palahniuk	Cameron Stewart	Dave McCaig	David Mack; Steve Morris (variant)	
Fight Club 3 #8	August 28, 2019	Chuck Palahniuk	Cameron Stewart	Dave McCaig	David Mack; Duncan Fegredo (variant)	
Fight Club 3 #9	September 25, 2019	Chuck Palahniuk	Cameron Stewart	Dave McCaig	David Mack; Steve Morris (variant)	
Fight Club 3 #10	October 30, 2019	Chuck Palahniuk	Cameron Stewart	Dave McCaig	David Mack; Duncan Fegredo (variant)	
Fight Club 3 #11	November 27, 2019	Chuck Palahniuk	Cameron Stewart	Dave McCaig	David Mack; Eric Wilkerson (variant)	
Fight Club 3 #12	December 26, 2019	Chuck Palahniuk	Cameron Stewart	Dave McCaig	David Mack; Duncan Fegredo (variant)	

=== Collection ===
Format	Collects	Published	ISBN
Hardcover	Fight Club 3 #1–12	April 14, 2020	ISBN 9781506711805
