= The Narrator (Fight Club) =

Fictional character of franchise Fight Club

The Narrator Tyler Durden
- Fight Club character
- Edward Norton as the Narrator (left) and Brad Pitt as Tyler Durden (right).
- First appearance: Fight Club (1996)
- Created by: Chuck Palahniuk
- Portrayed by: The Narrator: Edward Norton (film); Tyler Durden: Brad Pitt (film)
- Voiced by: The Narrator: Dave Wittenberg (video game); Tyler Durden: Joshua Leonard (video game)

In-universe information
- Aliases: Tyler Durden; Joe; Jack; Sebastian; Cornelius; Rupert; Lenny; Travis; Mr. Taylor; Ozzie; Harriet; Trevor; Balthazar; Dr. Jekyll
- Occupation: Automobile recall coordinator; soapmaker; movie theatre projectionist; banquet waiter; military contractor
- Spouse: Marla Singer
- Children: Junior

The Narrator is a fictional character who serves as both the protagonist and main antagonist of the 1996 Chuck Palahniuk novel Fight Club, the 1999 film adaptation Fight Club, and the comic book sequels Fight Club 2 and Fight Club 3. The character is an insomniac with dissociative identity disorder (DID), and is depicted as an unnamed everyman (credited in the film as "the Narrator") during the day, who becomes the chaotic and charismatic Tyler Durden at night during periods of insomnia.

In 2008, Tyler was selected by Empire magazine as the greatest movie character of all time, shortly after Fight Club was voted by Empire readers as the tenth greatest film of all time.

== Appearances ==
=== Novels ===
==== Pursuit of Happiness (1995) ====
The Narrator first appeared in a seven-page short story in the 1995 compilation Pursuit of Happiness. This story later became chapter six of the novel Fight Club, which Palahniuk published in 1996.

==== Fight Club (1996) ====
In the 1996 novel, the Narrator is depicted as an average middle-class man employed at an unnamed automobile company, wherein he inspects car accidents to determine if an automobile model should be recalled. Suffering from insomnia and depression, he begins visiting support groups for people with illnesses that he is not afflicted with himself. This induces catharsis within him, enabling him to sleep. When an impostor named Marla Singer begins to appear at the groups, his euphoria is broken and his insomnia returns.

The Narrator meets a man named Tyler Durden on a nudist beach, and begins living with him after his condominium explodes due to unknown causes. The duo establish a weekly meeting known as "fight club", in which they and other men can engage in bare-knuckle fistfights. After Marla calls their residence, threatening suicide, she and Tyler begin an affair that confounds the Narrator. Tyler initiates a cult-like organisation known as Project Mayhem in order to aggressively promote his anti-consumerist ideals, but the Narrator becomes increasingly uneasy with the group as its activities become more destructive.

The Narrator learns that he and Tyler are, in fact, the same person, as the Narrator's mind formed a new personality that was able to escape from the issues that plagued his life. With the help of Project Mayhem, Tyler plans to destroy a skyscraper and a national museum using homemade explosives. Tyler plans to die alongside the Narrator as a martyr during the event. Attempting to stop Tyler's plan, the Narrator ascends to the roof of the building, where Tyler holds him at gunpoint. When Marla arrives on the roof with one of the support groups, Tyler vanishes, as Tyler "was his hallucination, not hers."

With Tyler gone, the Narrator waits for the explosives to kill him. However, the bomb malfunctions, as Tyler mixed paraffin into the explosives. Still alive and holding Tyler's pistol, the Narrator makes the choice to shoot himself. Later, he regains consciousness in a mental hospital, believing he is in Heaven, and imagines an argument with God over human nature. The novel ends with the Narrator being approached by hospital employees who are actually members of Project Mayhem.

The Narrator does not have a name in the novel, though he frequently uses the phrase "I am Joe's [blank]", referencing an old Reader's Digest series in which human organs wrote about themselves in the first person (e.g. "I am Jane's uterus").

==== Fight Club 2 (2015) ====
In the comic book sequel Fight Club 2, the Narrator goes by the name of Sebastian. Set ten years after the original novel, the Narrator is depicted as working for a private military contractor, while he and Marla are married and have a nine-year-old son named Junior. After Junior is killed in a house fire, it is revealed that the Narrator's mother and father both died in two other separate fires. Unlike in the film, Tyler's appearance is based on a personal friend of the author, depicted as having "shoulder-length-Jesus blond hair." His temper is somewhat kept under control through the Narrator's medication.

Fight Club 2 provides a new, drastically different explanation for Tyler: the Narrator discovers that Tyler is not merely his own alter, but essentially, a sort of meme who can spread from one person to another. The current host of the "Tyler Durden" personality damages the life of a younger child with the express purpose of causing the stress factors that will give rise to a new "Tyler Durden" personality in them when they grow up, thus allowing "Tyler Durden" to achieve a sort of functional immortality. The Narrator's therapist has pieced this together through hypnosis sessions, explaining to him that the Narrator's own father and grandfather were hosts, and that "Tyler" was involved in shaping Marla's life as well—"breeding them like cattle" for generations, so the Narrator and Marla could in turn produce a son, who would be Tyler's host in the next generation. Junior only faked his death in the fire, as he is slowly being taken over by his Tyler Durden just as his father was. The Narrator has to race to stop "Tyler", even though he cannot truly kill him without killing both his son and himself.

=== Film ===
In the 1999 film Fight Club, based on the Palahniuk novel and directed by David Fincher, the Narrator is portrayed by Edward Norton while Tyler is played by Brad Pitt. The actors began preparation for their roles by taking lessons in boxing, grappling, taekwondo, and soapmaking. Pitt made the decision to visit a dentist to have pieces of his front teeth chipped off so that the character of Tyler would have imperfect teeth. The pieces were restored after the film's production concluded.

The film's portrayal of the Narrator and Tyler is similar to that of the novel, with some differences. Unlike the novel, the two meet during a plane flight rather than on a nude beach, and the cinematic incarnation of Tyler does not murder anyone, unlike the literary version. Furthermore, while the novel ends with the Narrator in a mental hospital, the film concludes with the Narrator and Marla holding hands in a skyscraper, overlooking the skyline that is detonating due to Project Mayhem's explosives.

As in the novel, the Narrator does not have a name, though the script refers to him as "Jack".

=== Video games ===
In the 2004 video game Fight Club, developed by Genuine Games and released by Vivendi, the Narrator is voiced by Dave Wittenberg while Tyler is voiced by Joshua Leonard.

== Reception ==
In 2008, Tyler was selected by Empire magazine as the greatest movie character of all time. When the list was redone in 2015, he placed at number eight.

== See also ==
- Unreliable narrator
- Dissociative identity disorder
- Strange Case of Dr Jekyll and Mr Hyde
