= George Clooney filmography =

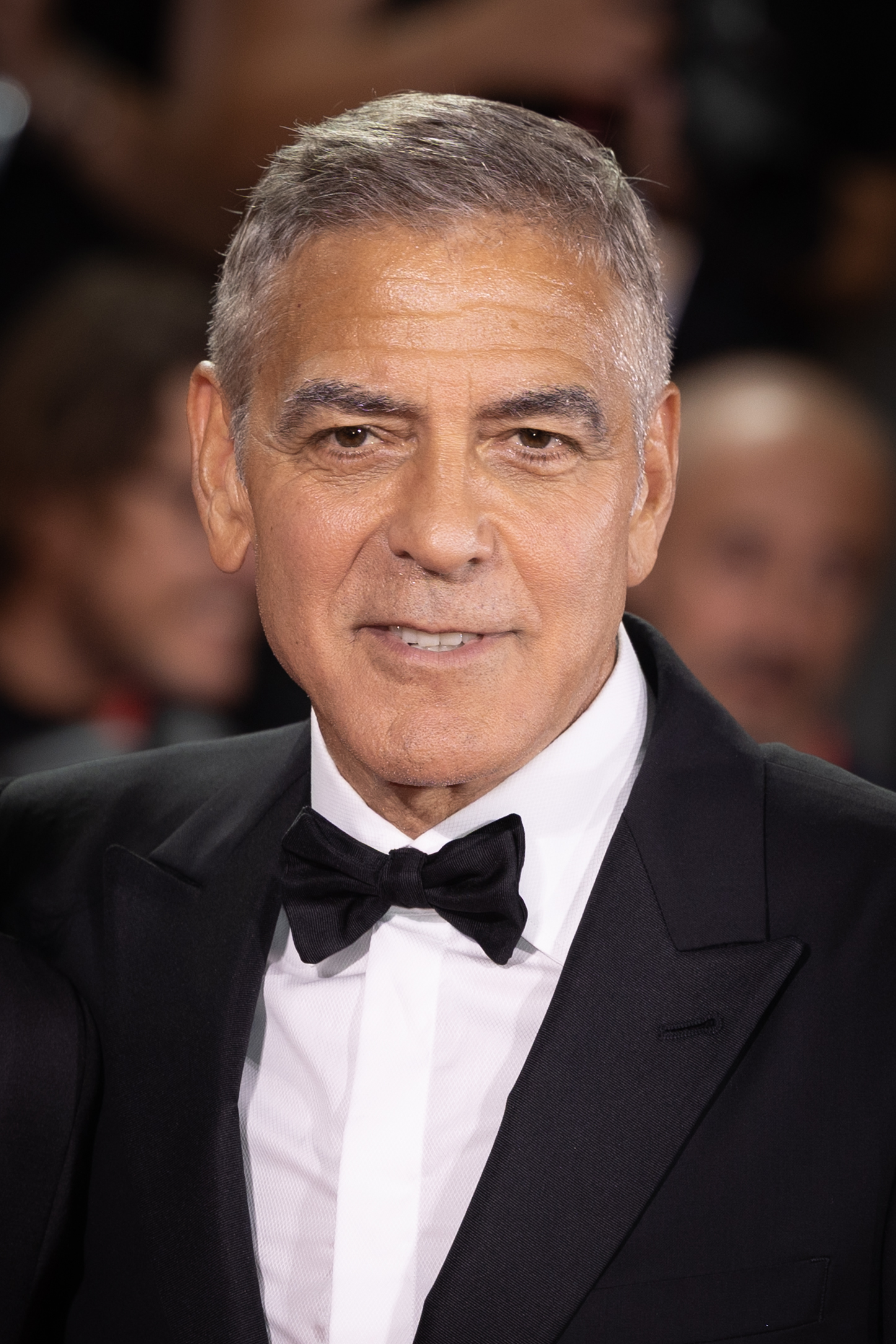
George Clooney at the 81st Venice International Film Festival in 2024.

George Clooney is an American actor and filmmaker. He is one of the highest-grossing actors of all time with over $2.6 billion total box office gross and an average of $61.7 million per film. He has been involved in thirteen films that grossed over $200 million each at the worldwide box office.

Clooney started his career with minor recurring roles in the television series The Facts of Life (1985–1987), Roseanne (1988–1991), Bodies of Evidence (1992–1993), Sisters (1993–1994). He also took in early low-budget film roles in Grizzly II: Revenge (1983), Return to Horror High (1987), and Return of the Killer Tomatoes (1988). His breakthrough role was as doctor Doug Ross on the NBC medical drama series ER (1994–2000) earned him nominations for three Golden Globe Awards and two Primetime Emmy Awards for Outstanding Lead Actor in a Drama Series.

Clooney established himself as a leading film star in the 1990s with films such as From Dusk till Dawn (1996), One Fine Day (1996), The Peacemaker (1997), Batman & Robin (1997), and Out of Sight (1998). The new millennium saw Clooney in films The Perfect Storm (2000), which was a hit at the box office and O Brother, Where Art Thou? (2000), earning him a Golden Globe Award. He teamed up again with Soderbergh for the star-studded caper films Ocean's Eleven (2000), Ocean's Twelve (2004) and Ocean's Thirteen (2007). He has also acted in Solaris (2002), Intolerable Cruelty (2003), The Good German (2006), Burn After Reading (2008), Fantastic Mr. Fox (2009), Gravity (2013), and Tomorrowland (2015).

Clooney won the Academy Award for Best Supporting Actor for his role as a CIA agent in Syriana (2005). He was nominated for the Academy Award for Best Actor for his roles in Michael Clayton (2007), Up in the Air (2009), and The Descendants (2011), the later of which earned him the Golden Globe Award for Best Actor – Motion Picture Drama. Clooney expanded his career as a filmmaker directing and starring in Confessions of a Dangerous Mind (2002), Good Night, and Good Luck (2005), Leatherheads (2008), The Ides of March (2011), The Monuments Men (2014), and The Midnight Sky (2020). He took leading roles in Ticket to Paradise (2022), Wolfs (2024) and Jay Kelly (2025).

== Film ==
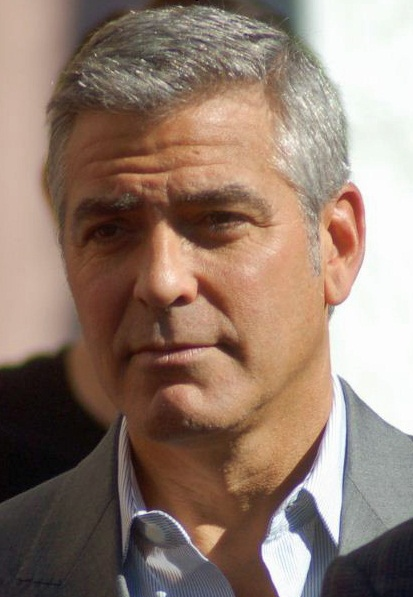
At a ceremony for John Wells to receive a star on the Hollywood Walk of Fame in January 2012

=== As an actor ===
Year	Title	Role	Notes
1983	Grizzly II: Revenge	Ron	
1987	Return to Horror High	Oliver	
1988	Return of the Killer Tomatoes	Matt Stevens	
1989	Red Surf	Remar	
1992	Unbecoming Age	Mac	
1993	The Harvest	Lip Syncing Transvestite	Cameo
1996	From Dusk till Dawn	Seth Gecko	
1996	One Fine Day	Jack Taylor	
1997	Batman & Robin	Bruce Wayne / Batman	
1997	The Peacemaker	Lt. Col. Thomas Devoe	
1998	The Thin Red Line	Captain Charles Bosche	
1998	Out of Sight	Jack Foley	
1998	Waiting for Woody	Himself	Short film
1999	Three Kings	Archie Gates	
1999	The Book That Wrote Itself	Himself	Cameo
1999	South Park: Bigger, Longer & Uncut	Dr. Horatio Gauche	Voice cameo
2000	The Perfect Storm	Captain Billy Tyne	
2000	O Brother, Where Art Thou?	Ulysses Everett McGill	
2001	Ocean's Eleven	Danny Ocean	
2001	Spy Kids	Diego Devlin	
2002	Confessions of a Dangerous Mind	Jim Byrd	
2002	Solaris	Chris Kelvin	
2002	Welcome to Collinwood	Jerzy	
2003	Spy Kids 3-D: Game Over	President Diego Devlin	
2003	Intolerable Cruelty	Miles Massey	
2004	Ocean's Twelve	Danny Ocean	
2005	Good Night, and Good Luck	Fred Friendly	
2005	Syriana	Bob Barnes	
2006	The Good German	Jake Geismer	
2007	Michael Clayton	Michael Clayton	
2007	Ocean's Thirteen	Danny Ocean	
2007	Sand and Sorrow	Narrator	Documentary
2007	Darfur Now	Himself	Documentary
2008	Leatherheads	Jimmy "Dodge" Connelly	
2008	Burn After Reading	Harry Pfarrer	
2009	Fantastic Mr. Fox	Mr. Fox	Voice
2009	The Men Who Stare at Goats	Lyn Cassady	
2009	Up in the Air	Ryan Bingham	
2010	Morning Glory	Himself	Uncredited cameo
2010	The American	Jack / Edward	
2011	The Ides of March	Governor Mike Morris	
2011	The Descendants	Matthew "Matt" King	
2013	Gravity	Matthew "Matt" Kowalski	
2014	The Monuments Men	Frank Stokes	
2015	Tomorrowland	Frank Walker	
2016	Hail, Caesar!	Baird Whitlock	
2016	Money Monster	Lee Gates	
2020	The Midnight Sky	Augustine Lofthouse	
2022	Ticket to Paradise	David Cotton	
2023	The Flash	Bruce Wayne	Uncredited cameo
2024	IF	Spaceman	Voice
2024	Wolfs	Margaret's Man	Also producer
2025	Nespresso: The Detective	The Detective	Short film
2025	Jay Kelly	Jay Kelly	
2026	Call My Agent! The Movie	George Clooney	Uncredited cameo
TBA	In Love		Filming

=== As a filmmaker ===
Year	Title	Director	Producer	Writer
2002	Confessions of a Dangerous Mind	Yes	No	No
2005	Good Night, and Good Luck	Yes	No	Yes
2008	Leatherheads	Yes	Yes	Uncredited
2011	The Ides of March	Yes	Yes	Yes
2014	The Monuments Men	Yes	Yes	Yes
2017	Suburbicon	Yes	Yes	Yes
2020	The Midnight Sky	Yes	Yes	No
2021	The Tender Bar	Yes	Yes	No
2023	The Boys in the Boat	Yes	Yes	No

Producer only

- Welcome to Collinwood (2002)
- Starbuck Holger Meins (2002) (Documentary)
- Criminal (2004)
- The Jacket (2005)
- The Men Who Stare at Goats (2009)
- Playground (2009)
- The American (2010)
- Argo (2012)
- August: Osage County (2013)
- Our Brand Is Crisis (2015)
- Money Monster (2016)
- The Art of Political Murder (2020)
- In Love (TBA)

Executive producer

- Rock Star (2001)
- Insomnia (2002)
- Far from Heaven (2002)
- Syriana (2005)
- Rumor Has It... (2005)
- A Scanner Darkly (2006)
- Pu-239 (2006)
- Michael Clayton (2007)
- Sand and Sorrow (2007) (Documentary)
- Wind Chill (2007)
- The Informant! (2009)
- Ticket to Paradise (2022)
- How to Build a Truth Engine (2024)
- Surviving Ohio State (2025)
- Furies (2026)

== Television ==
Year	Title	Role	Notes
1971	The Uncle Al Show	Ship's captain	Skit performer
1984–1985	E/R	Mark "Ace" Kolmar	8 episodes
1984	Riptide	Lenny Colwell	Episode: "Where the Girls Are"
1985	Street Hawk	Kevin Stark	Episode: "A Second Self"
1985	Crazy Like a Fox	Skip	Episode: "Suitable for Framing"
1985–1987	The Facts of Life	George Burnett	17 episodes
1986	Hotel	Nick Miller	Episode: "Recriminations"
1986	Throb	Rollo Moldonaldo	Episode: "My Fair Punker Lady"
1986	Combat Academy	Cadet Major Biff Woods	Television movie, also known as Combat High
1987	Hunter	Matthew Winfield	Episode: "Double Exposure"
1987	Murder, She Wrote	Kip Howard	Episode: "No Laughing Murder"
1987	The Golden Girls	Det. Bobby Hopkins	Episode: "To Catch a Neighbor"
1988–1991	Roseanne	Booker Brooks	11 episodes
1990, 1992	Sunset Beat	Officer Chris Chesbro	6 episodes
1991	Baby Talk	Joe	5 episodes
1992	Jack's Place	Rick Logan	Episode "Everything Old Is New Again"
1992–1993	Bodies of Evidence	Det. Ryan Walker	16 episodes
1993	The Building	Bonnie's Fiancée	Episode: "Pilot"
1993	Without Warning: Terror in the Towers	Kevin Shea	Television movie
1993–1994	Sisters	Det. James Falconer	19 episodes
1994–1999; 2000, 2009	ER	Dr. Doug Ross	109 episodes
1995	Friends	Dr. Michael Mitchell	Episode: "The One with Two Parts: Part Two"
1995	Saturday Night Live	Himself (host)	Episode: "George Clooney/The Cranberries"
1997	South Park	Sparky the Dog (voice)	Episode: "Big Gay Al's Big Gay Boat Ride"
1998	Murphy Brown	Doctor #2	Episode: "Never Can Say Goodbye: Part 2"
1999	Kilroy	—N/a	TV movie; Producer and writer
2000	Fail Safe	Colonel Jack Grady	Live television production; also executive producer
2003	K Street	—N/a	Executive producer, 10 episodes
2005	Unscripted	—N/a	Executive producer (10 episodes), also director (5 episodes)
2010	Hope for Haiti Now	Himself	Also creator, developer, executive producer and co-host
2010–2011	Memphis Beat	—N/a	Executive producer
2014	Text Santa 4	George Oceans Gravity	Downton Abbey charity sketch
2015	A Very Murray Christmas	Himself	Television special
2018	My Next Guest Needs No Introduction with David Letterman	Himself	Episode: "You Be the Newsman, I'll Be Liz Taylor"
2019	Catch-22	Scheisskopf	3 episodes, also executive producer and director
2019	On Becoming a God in Central Florida	—N/a	Executive producer
2020	Trial by Media	—N/a	Executive producer
2020	The Art of Political Murder	—N/a	Executive producer
2021	Last Week Tonight with John Oliver	Himself	Cameos; Episode: "Sponsored Content"
2022	The Last Movie Stars	Paul Newman (voice)	6 episode docuseries
2022	Norman Lear: 100 Years of Music & Laughter	Himself	Television special
2024–present	The Agency	—N/a	Executive producer
2025	Good Night, and Good Luck	Edward R. Murrow	Also writer, CNN live airing of his play

== Theatre ==
Year	Title	Role	Playwright	Venue	Ref.
1986	Vicious	Male Prostitute Drug Dealer	Denis Spedaliere	Los Angeles / Steppenwolf Theater, Chicago	
2025	Good Night, and Good Luck	Edward R. Murrow	Clooney and Grant Heslov	Winter Garden Theatre, Broadway debut	

== See also ==
- List of awards and nominations received by George Clooney

== Bibliography ==
- "George Clooney—Famous Works". Film Reference.
- "George Clooney—Overview>Biography/Filmography>Awards". allmovie.com.
- "George Clooney—Biography>Highest Rated Movies>Filmography". Rotten Tomatoes.
