= Sig Mickelson =

American broadcast executive (1913–2000)

Siegfried Thor "Sig" Mickelson (May 24, 1913 – March 24, 2000) was an American broadcast executive who was the first president of CBS News from 1959 to 1961.

== Early life and education ==
Mickelson was born in Clinton, Minnesota, the son of Olaf Erling Mickelson and the former Harriet Magdalene Reinholdtsen. While he was still a toddler, his father moved the family to Sioux Falls, South Dakota, where he attended public school.

Upon finishing his education in the public schools, he next attended Augustana College in Sioux Falls, graduating with a bachelor of arts degree in 1934.

Following his graduation from Augustana, Mickelson stayed in Sioux Falls, where he worked as a part-time reporter for the Argus Leader newspaper and newscaster for radio station KSOO. After working for a time as a reporter, Mickelson was caught in the fallout from an earlier legal dispute in which the Associated Press (and the Argus Leader, the AP's local affiliate) had sued KSOO, alleging news piracy. In 1937, Mickelson returned to school for his master's degree, attending the University of Minnesota, and graduated with a master of arts in 1940.

== Career ==
Although he had intended to return to reporting following his graduation from the University of Minnesota, Mickelson instead became a journalism professor at Louisiana State University. He next taught at the University of Kansas before returning to University of Minnesota in the fall of 1941.

=== CBS ===
Mickelson joined CBS in 1943 as the news editor at corporate owned-and-operated radio station WCCO in Minneapolis. In 1949, he was invited by CBS vice president of news and public affairs Davidson Taylor to become the network's director of discussion. Following Taylor's resignation late in 1949, Mickelson became director of public affairs for CBS in July of that year, with responsibility for both the radio and television public affairs programming, although he was not made a vice president and reported to Hubbell Robinson, the vice president in charge of programming. Edmund Chester remained in charge of the combined news operations until a 1951 reorganization split CBS's radio and television news operations. Chester retained control of CBS's radio news division, while the television news portion fell to Sig Mickelson.

Mickelson selected Walter Cronkite, who was then working as a reporter for WTOP-TV, the CBS owned-and-operated station in Washington, D.C., to report on the 1952 Republican and Democratic National Conventions. Mickelson had initially made Cronkite's acquaintance while teaching at the University of Kansas while Cronkite was working at the United Press bureau in Kansas City. It was during the planning of convention coverage that Mickelson first applied the appellation "anchor man", a term from sports, to the central role Cronkite would fill on air.

In August 1954, Mickelson was named vice president in charge of news and public affairs in a reorganization that combined CBS's radio and television news departments.

As part of the establishment of CBS News as an operating division, Mickelson was made president in October 1959.

CBS' 1960 coverage of the conventions and the subsequent elections had been beaten in the ratings by NBC. A decision was taken in December, 1960; Mickelson was out, to be replaced by Richard S. Salant. Mickelson would stay on as president for the next two months, but only as part of a new editorial board headed by Salant, before finally leaving in February 1961.

=== Later career ===
Mickelson had spent at least some of the previous few months lining himself up a new job. He became vice president for broadcasting at Time-Life, where he would stay until 1970. He next took a position with Encyclopædia Britannica's broadcast organization, which was to be his last job in the private sector.

Returning to academia, Mickelson taught television journalism and served as chairman of the editorial department at Northwestern University's Medill School of Journalism from 1972 to 1975.

In April 1975, Mickelson became the head of the newly-combined Radio Free Europe and Radio Liberty.

From 1978 to 1991, Mickelson was associated with San Diego State University. From 1979 to 1981, he was both Executive Director for San Diego State University's Center for Communications and a Distinguished Visiting Professor of Journalism in the Department of Telecommunications and Film. He returned to SDSU in 1987 as an adjunct professor and was from 1989 to 1991 the Lionel Van Deerlin Professor of Communications at SDSU.

=== Other activities ===
Mickelson was a charter member of the National Association of Radio News Editors, which quickly changed its name to the National Association of Radio News Directors (NARND) at its inaugural convention in 1946. He would serve as first vice-president for two years, then was elected president at the NARND's 1948 convention, replacing founding president John F. Hogan.

== Personal life ==
Mickelson was married twice. He had two children with his first wife, Maybelle Brown, who died in 1985. He met his second wife, Elena Mier y Teran, while at SDSU, and married her on June 14, 1986. They remained together until his death. Mickelson died of complications of pneumonia on March 24, 2000 at Scripps Mercy Hospital.

== Portrayals ==
Mickelson is played by Jeff Daniels in George Clooney's Good Night, and Good Luck.

== Books ==
Mickelson wrote five books over the years, many to do with politics, news and television.

- The Electric Mirror: Politics in an Age of Television. New York: Dodd, Mead (1972).
- America's Other Voice: The Story of Radio Free Europe and Radio Liberty. New York: Praeger (1983).
- The First Amendment – The Challenge of New Technology. Edited with Elena Mier Y Taran. New York: Praeger (1989). ISBN 978-0275930882.

Papers presented at a conference convened in November 1987 by the San Diego Communications Council.

- From Whistle Stop to Sound Bite: Four Decades of Politics and Television. New York: Praeger (1989).
- The Northern Pacific Railroad and the Selling of the West: A Nineteenth-Century Public Relations Venture (1993)

This book, while his fifth published, is actually his first. It was originally written as Mickelson's master's thesis, and explores the use of promotion and propaganda by the Northern Pacific Railroad to encourage settlers on its land.

- The Decade that Shaped Television News: CBS in the 1950s. Westport, Conn.: Praeger (1998).
