= Shirley Wershba =

American radio and television news producer (1922–2026)

- Born: Shirley Lubowitz; July 7, 1922; New York City, U.S.
- Died: June 6, 2026 (aged 103); Floral Park, New York, U.S.
- Education: Brooklyn College
- Occupations: Television and radio news producer
- Years active: 1944–2026
- Known for: Producer for CBS, ABC, NBC, and PBS
- Spouse: Joseph Wershba
- Awards: Emmy Award nomination

Shirley Wershba (née Lubowitz; July 7, 1922 – June 6, 2026) was an American radio and television news producer who worked at CBS, NBC, ABC, and PBS during a career in broadcast journalism.

== Early Life ==
Wershba was born on July 7, 1922, in New York City. She graduated from Brooklyn College in the class of 1943.

== Career ==
Wershba joined the CBS radio news division in 1944. She later worked as a producer and writer for the CBS radio program Dimension of a Woman's World and became a producer for programs such as The MacNeil/Lehrer Report and 60 Minutes.

Wershba also worked as a reporter and writer for CBS Morning News, earning an Emmy Award nomination for her work. She later collaborated with her husband Joseph Wershba on CBS News productions.

== Personal Life ==
Wershba was married to fellow CBS journalist Joseph Wershba until his death in 2011. In 1996, the couple donated their professional papers to the Dolph Briscoe Center for American History at the University of Texas at Austin.

She died at the age of 103 on June 6, 2026, in Floral Park, New York. She was survived by her children Randi and Don, and two granddaughters.

== Portrayal ==
Wershba was portrayed by Patricia Clarkson in George Clooney's 2005 film Good Night, and Good Luck.
