= Theatre Row =

Theatre Row may refer to:

- Theatre Row (New York City)

- Theatre Row Building - a theatre complex in the New York neighborhood

- Hollywood Theatre Row
