= The Complex (Los Angeles, California) =

Historic commercial building in Hollywood, California

- Interactive map of the The Complex area

General information
- Type: Commercial
- Architectural style: Spanish Colonial Revival
- Location: 6464-6480 Santa Monica Boulevard, Hollywood, California
- Coordinates: 34.0906°N 118.3307°W
- Year built: 1928

Design and construction
- Architect: John Robert Harris

Los Angeles Historic-Cultural Monument
- Designated: December 1, 2023
- Reference no.: 1295

The Complex is a historic commercial building located at 6464-6480 Santa Monica Boulevard, on the corner of Santa Monica Boulevard and Wilcox Avenue, in Hollywood, California. It formerly housed a theater and studio space that was also named The Complex, which was an anchor for Hollywood Theatre Row. The building was designated a Los Angeles Historic-Cultural Monument in 2023, however, the designation did not include the interior.

== History ==
The Complex was designed by John Robert Harris for John R. Black and built alongside the Pacific Railroad Company red car line in 1928. The building housed fifteen different labor unions between 1930 and 1960, many of which represented individuals in the film industry.

The building was sold in 2022, then designated Los Angeles Historic-Cultural Monument No. 1295 on December 1, 2023. The designation does not include the interior.

=== Theater and studio space ===
In the late 1960s/early 1970s, a portion of the building was converted to theater and studio space. Richmond Shepard ran the space from the late 1970s to 1990. In 1991, the space was bought by Matt Chait, and the following year he led the movement to have the area branded Hollywood Theatre Row. Chait renamed the theater The Complex and during his ownership, he expanded the space to five studio spaces and five theaters, the latter of which was the most in any space along Hollywood Theatre Row.

The Complex hosted many classes and shows over the years. Notably, Vicious played here in 1991, Upright Citizens Brigade’s first sketch comedy writing class in Los Angeles was held here in 2005, for many years the space hosted numerous shows that were part of the Hollywood Fringe Festival, and the space was home to the Theatre of the Arts acting school.

Chait sold his business c. 2017. (Note: Chait sold the business "five years ago" in 2022.) Under new ownership, the business did not survive the Covid 19 pandemic; it remained closed for about 18 months, then Chait resumed management in 2022. The theater closed later that year, when the building owner refused to renew its lease.

== Architecture and design ==
The Complex is a two-story mixed-use development, with storefronts on the first floor and residences on the second. The building is rectangular in plan, built of brick with a wood and steel frame and stucco cladding, features a Spanish Colonial Revival design, and is mostly topped by a flat roof with a raised parapet. The northwest corner of the building, however, is topped by a pyramidal roof that rises above the roofline.

The building's primary facade faces north and is asymmetrical in design. The ground floor facade consists of an arcade of five round arch storefronts with multi-lite transoms next to a shouldered arch storefront on the northwest corner. The corner storefront also features thick columns and whimsical ornamentation that is made of plaster and surrounds the storefront's multi-lite transom window. The second-floor features two lancet arch windows with divided-lite steel transoms and additional divided-lite steel casement windows; it also features stepped pilasters and the northwest corner features vents with a floral motif.

The building's west-facing first floor facade features two round arches and a shouldered arch, all of which have been infilled. The second floor facade features the same windows as the north facade, although fewer in number.

Inside, the building features a first floor lobby and box office, second floor mezzanine and offices, doors with decorative molding and infilled transom openings, and a staircase and balcony with a wrought iron railing.
