= List of awards and nominations received by George Clooney =

George Clooney awards and nominations
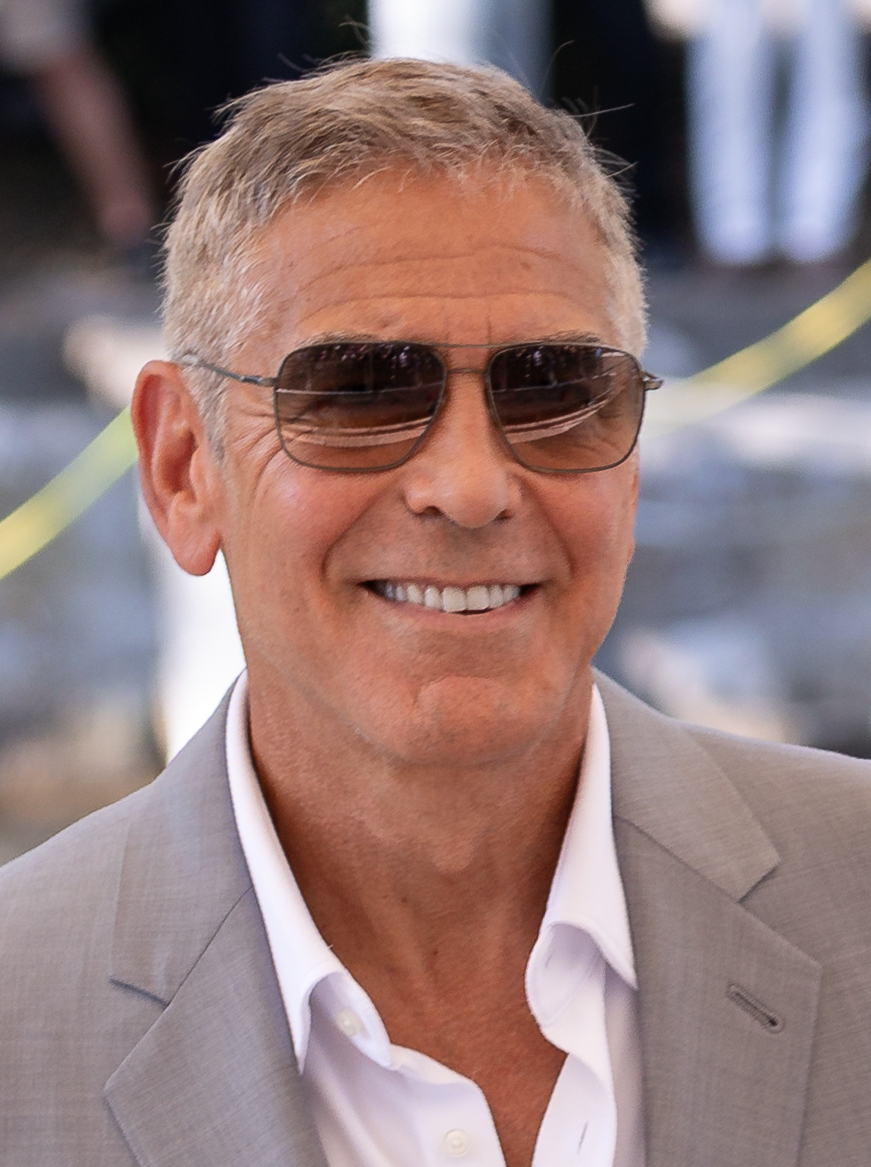
- Clooney at the Venice International Film Festival in 2025
Awards and nominations
Award	Wins	Nominations
Academy Awards	2	8
BAFTA Awards	1	9
Golden Globe Awards	3	14
Emmy Awards	0	3
SAG Awards	4	13
Tony Awards	0	1

Totals (Note: Certain award groups do not simply award one winner. They acknowledge several different recipients, have runners-up, and have third place. Since this is a specific recognition and is different from losing an award, runner-up mentions are considered wins in this award tally. For simplification and to avoid errors, each award in this list has been presumed to have had a prior nomination.)
- Wins: 67
- Nominations: 123

The following is a list of awards and nominations received by George Clooney.

George Clooney is an American filmmaker and actor. Throughout his career he received numerous accolades including two Academy Awards, a BAFTA Award, three Golden Globe Awards, and four Screen Actors Guild Awards as well as nominations for three Emmy Awards and a Tony Award. During his career he has received several honors including the Bob Hope Humanitarian Award in 2010, the Stanley Kubrick Award in 2013, the Cecil B. DeMille Award in 2015, the Honorary César in 2017, the AFI Life Achievement Award in 2018, and the Kennedy Center Honors in 2022.

Clooney has received eight Academy Award nominations, winning two—Best Supporting Actor for his portrayal of a veteran CIA officer in Syriana (2005) and as co-producer of Best Picture winner Argo (2012). He was previously Oscar-nominated for Best Actor for his performances as an attorney in Michael Clayton (2007), a suave businessman in Up in the Air (2009), and a widower patriarch in The Descendants (2011). He was also nominated for Best Director, and Best Original Screenplay for Good Night, and Good Luck (2005), and Best Adapted Screenplay for The Ides of March (2011).

He is one of only three people ever to have been nominated in six different Academy Award categories (Best Picture; Best Director; Best Original Screenplay; Best Adapted Screenplay; Best Lead Actor; Best Supporting Actor), following Walt Disney and later joined by Alfonso Cuarón. (This record has since been surpassed by Kenneth Branagh, who has been nominated in seven different categories.)

On television, he appeared in The Facts of Life and Roseanne before landing the role of Dr. Doug Ross on the long-running NBC medical drama series ER. From 1994 to 1999, he was nominated twice for the Primetime Emmy Award for Outstanding Lead Actor in a Drama Series, three times for the Golden Globe Award for Best Actor – Television Series Drama, and twice for the Screen Actors Guild Award for Outstanding Actor in a Drama Series. He won four Outstanding Ensemble in a Drama Series with the cast in 1996-99.

In 2025, Clooney made his Broadway debut in Good Night, and Good Luck, which earned him his first nomination for the Tony Award for Best Actor in a Play.

== Major associations ==
=== Academy Awards ===
Year	Category	Nominated work	Result	Ref.
2006	Best Director	Good Night, and Good Luck	Nominated	
2006	Best Original Screenplay	Good Night, and Good Luck	Nominated	
2006	Best Supporting Actor	Syriana	Won	
2008	Best Actor	Michael Clayton	Nominated	
2010	Best Actor	Up in the Air	Nominated	
2012	Best Actor	The Descendants	Nominated	
2012	Best Adapted Screenplay	The Ides of March	Nominated	
2013	Best Picture	Argo	Won	

=== BAFTA Awards ===
Year	Category	Nominated work	Result	Ref.
British Academy Film Awards
2006	Best Actor in a Supporting Role	Syriana	Won	
2006	Best Actor in a Supporting Role	Good Night, and Good Luck	Nominated	
2006	Best Direction	Good Night, and Good Luck	Nominated	
2006	Best Original Screenplay	Good Night, and Good Luck	Nominated	
2008	Best Actor in a Leading Role	Michael Clayton	Nominated	
2010	Best Actor in a Leading Role	Up in the Air	Nominated	
2012	Best Actor in a Leading Role	The Descendants	Nominated	
2012	Best Adapted Screenplay	The Ides of March	Nominated	
2013	Best Film	Argo	Won	

=== Critics' Choice Awards ===
Year	Category	Nominated work	Result	Ref.
Critics' Choice Movie Awards
2005	Best Acting Ensemble	Ocean's Twelve	Nominated	
2006	Best Director	Good Night, and Good Luck	Nominated	
2006	Best Writer	Good Night, and Good Luck	Nominated	
2006	Freedom Award	Good Night, and Good Luck	Won	
2006	Best Supporting Actor	Syriana	Nominated	
2008	Best Actor	Michael Clayton	Nominated	
2010	Best Actor	Up in the Air	Nominated	
2012	Best Actor	The Descendants	Won	
Critics' Choice Television Awards
2020	Best Supporting Actor in a Miniseries or Movie	Catch-22	Nominated	

=== Emmy Awards ===
Year	Category	Nominated work	Result	Ref.
Primetime Emmy Award
1995	Outstanding Lead Actor in a Drama Series	ER (episode: "Long Day's Journey")	Nominated	
1996	Outstanding Lead Actor in a Drama Series	ER (episode: "Hell and High Water")	Nominated	
2010	Outstanding Variety, Music Or Comedy Special	Hope for Haiti Now	Nominated	

=== Golden Globe Awards ===
Year	Category	Nominated work	Result	Ref.
1996	Best Actor in a Television Series – Drama	ER	Nominated	
1997	Best Actor in a Television Series – Drama	ER	Nominated	
1998	Best Actor in a Television Series – Drama	ER	Nominated	
2001	Best Limited or Anthology Series or Television Film	Fail Safe	Nominated	
2001	Best Actor in a Motion Picture – Musical or Comedy	O Brother, Where Art Thou?	Won	
2006	Best Supporting Actor – Motion Picture	Syriana	Won	
2006	Best Director – Motion Picture	Good Night, and Good Luck	Nominated	
2006	Best Screenplay – Motion Picture	Good Night, and Good Luck	Nominated	
2008	Best Actor in a Motion Picture – Drama	Michael Clayton	Nominated	
2010	Best Actor in a Motion Picture – Drama	Up in the Air	Nominated	
2012	Best Director – Motion Picture	The Ides of March	Nominated	
2012	Best Screenplay – Motion Picture	The Ides of March	Nominated	
2012	Best Actor in a Motion Picture – Drama	The Descendants	Won	
2015	Cecil B. DeMille Award	—N/a	Honored	
2026	Best Actor in a Motion Picture – Musical or Comedy	Jay Kelly	Nominated	

=== Screen Actors Guild Awards ===
Year	Category	Nominated work	Result	Ref.
1995	Outstanding Ensemble in a Drama Series (Note: Shared with the cast)	ER	Nominated	
1996	Outstanding Ensemble in a Drama Series	ER	Won	
1996	Outstanding Male Actor in a Drama Series	ER	Nominated	
1997	Outstanding Male Actor in a Drama Series	ER	Nominated	
1997	Outstanding Ensemble in a Drama Series	ER	Won	
1998	Outstanding Ensemble in a Drama Series	ER	Won	
1999	Outstanding Ensemble in a Drama Series	ER	Won	
2006	Outstanding Male Actor in a Supporting Role	Syriana	Nominated	
2006	Outstanding Cast in a Motion Picture	Good Night, and Good Luck.	Nominated	
2008	Outstanding Male Actor in a Leading Role	Michael Clayton	Nominated	
2010	Outstanding Male Actor in a Leading Role	Up in the Air	Nominated	
2012	Outstanding Male Actor in a Leading Role	The Descendants	Nominated	
2012	Outstanding Cast in a Motion Picture	The Descendants	Nominated	

=== Tony Awards ===
Year	Category	Nominated work	Result	Ref.
2025	Best Actor in a Play	Good Night, and Good Luck	Nominated	

== Miscellaneous awards ==
Organizations	Year	Category	Work	Result	Ref.
Awards Circuit Community Award	2005	Best Actor in a Supporting Role	Syriana	Nominated	
Awards Circuit Community Award	2005	Best Director	Good Night, and Good Luck	Nominated	
Awards Circuit Community Award	2005	Best Original Screenplay (Note: Shared with Grant Heslov)	Good Night, and Good Luck	Nominated	
Awards Circuit Community Award	2005	Best Cast Ensemble	Good Night, and Good Luck	Nominated	
Awards Circuit Community Award	2008	Best Cast Ensemble	Burn After Reading	Nominated	
Awards Circuit Community Award	2009	Best Actor in a Leading Role	Up in the Air	Nominated	
Awards Circuit Community Award	2009	Best Cast Ensemble	Up in the Air	Runner Up	
Awards Circuit Community Award	2011	Best Actor in a Leading Role	The Descendants	Nominated	
Awards Circuit Community Award	2012	Best Motion Picture (Note: Shared with Ben Affleck, Grant Heslov)	Argo	Nominated	
Central Ohio Film Critics Association	2009	Best Actor	Up in the Air	Won	
Central Ohio Film Critics Association	2009	Actor of the Year	The Men Who Stare at Goats / Up in the Air / Fantastic Mr. Fox	Won	
Capri Hollywood International Film Festival	2025	Capri Ensemble Cast Award (Note: Shared with Adam Sandler, Billy Crudup, Laura Dern, Alba Rohrwacher and Giovanni Esposito)	Jay Kelly	Won	
Cinema for Peace	2006	The Cinema for Peace Award	Good Night, and Good Luck	Won	
Directors Guild of America Awards	2005	Outstanding Directing – Feature Film	Good Night, and Good Luck	Nominated	
Empire Awards	2000	Best Actor	O Brother, Where Art Thou?	Nominated	
Empire Awards	2006	Best Director	Good Night, and Good Luck.	Nominated	
Fangoria Chainsaw Award	1997	Best Actor	From Dusk till Dawn	Won	
Independent Spirit Awards	2005	Best Director	Good Night, and Good Luck	Nominated	
MTV Movie & TV Awards	1996	Best Breakthrough Performance	From Dusk till Dawn	Won	
MTV Movie & TV Awards	1999	Best Kiss (Note: Shared with Jennifer Lopez)	Out of Sight	Nominated	
MTV Movie & TV Awards	2000	Best On-Screen Team (Note: Shared with Tim Blake Nelson & John Turturro)	O Brother, Where Art Thou?	Nominated	
MTV Movie & TV Awards	2002	Best Dressed	Ocean's Eleven	Nominated	
MTV Movie & TV Awards	2002	Best On-Screen Team	Ocean's Eleven	Nominated	
New York Film Critics Circle	2009	Best Actor	Fantastic Mr. Fox	Won	
Outer Critics Circle Award	2025	John Gassner Award	Good Night, and Good Luck	Won	
People's Choice Awards	2008	Favorite On Screen Match-Up (Note: Shared with Brad Pitt)	Ocean's Thirteen	Won	
People's Choice Awards	2012	Favorite Movie Icon		Nominated	
People's Choice Awards	2017	Favorite Dramatic Movie Actor	Money Monster	Nominated	
Satellite Awards	2000	Best Actor in a Motion Picture (Comedy/Musical)	O Brother, Where Art Thou?	Nominated	
Satellite Awards	2005	Best Original Screenplay (Motion Picture)	Good Night, and Good Luck.	Won	
Satellite Awards	2009	Best Actor in a Motion Picture (Comedy/Musical)	Up in the Air	Nominated	
Satellite Awards	2011	Best Actor in a Motion Picture (Drama)	The Descendants	Nominated	
Saturn Awards	1995	Best Film Lead Actor	From Dusk till Dawn	Won	
Saturn Awards	2002	Best Film Lead Actor	Solaris	Nominated	
Saturn Awards	2011	Best Film Lead Actor	The American	Nominated	
Saturn Awards	2014	Best Film Supporting Actor	Gravity	Nominated	
Teen Choice Awards	2007	Choice Movie Chemistry	Ocean's Thirteen	Won	
Writers Guild of America Awards	2005	Best Original Screenplay	Good Night, and Good Luck	Nominated	
Writers Guild of America Awards	2005	Paul Selvin Award	Good Night, and Good Luck	Won	

== Honorary awards ==
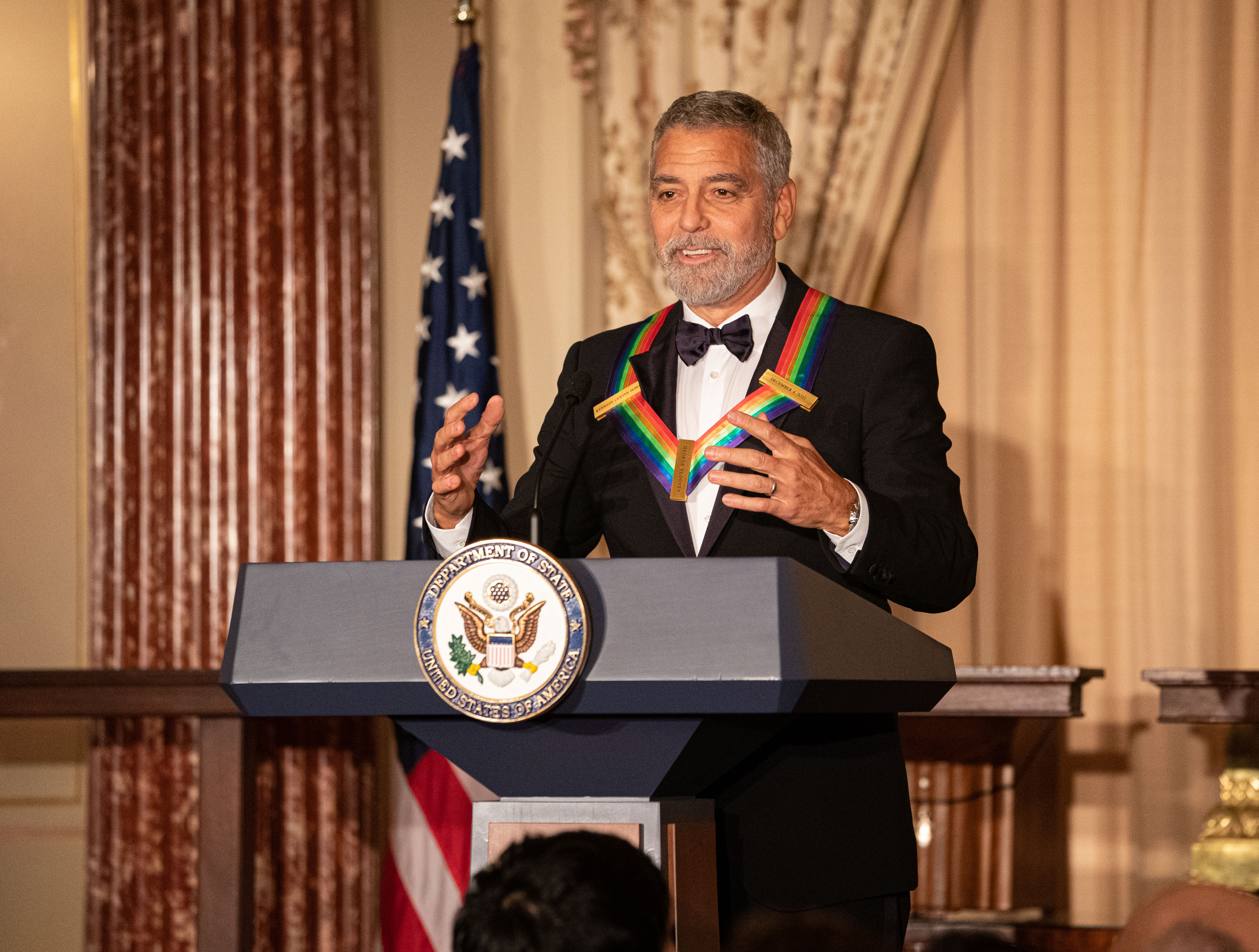
Clooney delivering remarks at the Kennedy Center Honors Dinner in 2022

Organizations	Year	Award	Result	Ref.
Santa Barbara International Film Festival	2006	Modern Master Award	Honoree	
Academy of Television Arts & Sciences	2010	Bob Hope Humanitarian Award	Honoree	
Telluride Film Festival	2011	Silver Medallion Award	Honoree	
Britannia Award	2013	Stanley Kubrick Award	Honoree	
Golden Globe Awards	2015	Cecil B. DeMille Award	Honoree	
César Awards	2017	Honorary César	Honoree	
American Film Institute	2018	AFI Life Achievement Award	Honoree	
Kennedy Center Honors	2022	Medal	Honoree	
Film at Lincoln Center	2026	Chaplin Award Tribute Gala	Honored	
Venice Film Festival	2026	Golden Lion for Lifetime Achievement	Honored	
