= Joseph Wershba =

American radio and TV journalist (1920–2011)

- Born: August 19, 1920; New York City, New York, U.S
- Died: May 14, 2011 (aged 90); Long Island, New York, U.S.
- Occupations: Television news producer, reporter
- Employer: CBS News
- Spouse: Shirley Lubowitz Wershba (m. 1948)
- Children: 2

Joseph Wershba (August 19, 1920 – May 14, 2011) was a professional journalist who joined the CBS News team in 1944, where he served as a writer, editor and correspondent. He was one of the six original producers of CBS's 60 Minutes from 1968 to 1988.

== Early life ==
He was the eldest child of Louis and Martha (née Peskin) Wershba, and had two younger siblings. His father was a garment worker. Wershba attended Abraham Lincoln High School. He entered Brooklyn College but dropped out after 3 years in 1940 and was drafted into the Army during World War II.

== Career at CBS News ==
In 1944 he was hired and spent four years as a writer for radio news programs. Later, at the Washington Bureau, he worked as a reporter on See it Now with Fred Friendly and Edward R. Murrow. His work with Murrow on See It Now reported on the activities of Senator Joseph McCarthy. Wershba started in television journalism working the microphone with Walter Cronkite on CBS's Washington, D.C. station news. After a stint as a columnist and feature writer for the New York Post (1958–1964), he returned to CBS. He produced documentaries for CBS Reports and was one of the original producers for 60 Minutes in 1968.

== Recognition ==
Joseph Wershba received the Society of the Silurians Excellence in Journalism Award. Other awards include the Hillman Prize, Emmys, American Bar Association, and Peabodys. He won two Emmy awards at 60 Minutes, for, respectively, What Happened in Tonkin Gulf (1971) and Teddy Kollek's Jerusalem (1978).

== Personal life ==
He and his wife/professional partner, Shirley, had two children. Initially the couple were forced to keep their marriage secret due to CBS network regulations. Shirley developed one of the first shows to focus on women's issues, Dimensions of a Women's World. The Wershbas resided in New Hyde Park, New York.

== Good Night, and Good Luck ==
Wershba was portrayed by Robert Downey Jr. in the 2005 film Good Night, and Good Luck; Shirley was portrayed by Patricia Clarkson. The secrecy of the Wershba marriage was a significant subsidiary theme in the film.
