= Leatherheads =

- Theatrical release poster
- Directed by: George Clooney
- Written by: Duncan Brantley; Rick Reilly
- Produced by: Grant Heslov; Casey Silver
- Starring: George Clooney; Renée Zellweger; John Krasinski; Jonathan Pryce
- Cinematography: Newton Thomas Sigel
- Edited by: Stephen Mirrione
- Music by: Randy Newman
- Production companies: Smokehouse Pictures; Casey Silver Productions; Mirage Enterprises
- Distributed by: Universal Pictures
- Release date: April 4, 2008
- Running time: 114 minutes
- Country: United States
- Language: English
- Budget: $58 million
- Box office: $41.3 million

Leatherheads is a 2008 American sports comedy film from Universal Pictures directed by and starring George Clooney. The film also stars Renée Zellweger, Jonathan Pryce, and John Krasinski and focuses on the early years of professional American football. The film was released on April 4, 2008. It received mixed reviews from critics and grossed $41 million against its $58 million budget.

== Plot ==
In 1925, Jimmy "Dodge" Connelly is captain of the Duluth Bulldogs, a struggling professional American football team. With pro football on the brink of collapse, Dodge convinces Princeton University's football star, Carter "the Bullet" Rutherford, to join the Bulldogs, capitalizing on his fame as a decorated hero of the First World War. Chicago Tribune newspaper reporter Lexie Littleton has been assigned to prove Carter's war heroics are bogus, but finds herself in a love triangle with Dodge and Carter. When Carter confesses that a German platoon surrendered to him by mistake, he discovers Lexie's agenda, and that she and Dodge shared a kiss. Threats by Carter's manager convince her to publish the story.

Carter's manager resorts to shady dealing to suppress the story, even bribing the original witness to change his statements. The new commissioner of football appointed by the U.S. Congress works toward legitimizing pro football by formalizing the game's rules and taking away its improvisational antics. He also attempts to clear the Carter controversy.

Public opinion turns against Lexie and Dodge interrupts a private hearing in the commissioner's office and threatens Carter with a confrontation by his old army comrades. Carter confesses the truth and the commissioner frees Lexie from printing a retraction. Carter modifies his story and returns much of his pay to the American Legion. Carter's conniving manager is banned from football and Dodge is warned that if he pulls any old tricks to win the next game, he will lose his place in the league.

Dodge's last game is played against Carter, who has changed sides from Duluth to Chicago and the rivalry for Lexie's affection spills onto the field. Dodge plays the game without reference to the rules. Dodge goes missing after a scrum, and with most players covered in mud, no one can tell who is who. There appears to be an interception and Chicago seems to have won, but when the mud is removed Dodge is revealed as the Chicago player on the play, which is changed to a touchdown resulting in a Bulldogs win.

Carter tells Dodge to quit playing football or he'll reveal the real story about his "capture" of the German soldiers to the newspapers. Dodge convinces him that the United States needs heroes and they part on good terms.

After the game, Dodge and Lexie ride into the sunset on Dodge's motorbike. During the end credits, pictures show Dodge and Lexie getting married, Carter donating $10,000 to the American Legion, and Carter's former manager with new clients Babe Ruth and Lou Gehrig.

== Real-life basis ==
Leatherheads is loosely based on the life of Johnny Blood, who played for the Green Bay Packers for 14 seasons and is a member of the Pro Football Hall of Fame, while the fictional team name "Duluth Bulldogs" was a combination of two historic teams: the Duluth Eskimos and the Canton Bulldogs. George Clooney noted that the NFL did not allow the production team to use the name "Duluth Eskimos" because the script had the characters drinking alcohol. Krasinski's character also takes inspiration from another hall of fame player, Red Grange, who helped usher in a transformative era in pro football.

== Cast ==
- George Clooney as Jimmy "Dodge" Connelly
- Renée Zellweger as Lexie Littleton
- John Krasinski as Carter Rutherford
- Jonathan Pryce as CC Frazier
- Peter Gerety as Commissioner Pete Harpin
- Jack Thompson as Harvey
- Stephen Root as Suds
- Wayne Duvall as Coach Frank Ferguson
- Keith Loneker as Big Gus
- Robert Baker as Stump
- Matt Bushell as Curly
- Malcolm Goodwin as Bakes
- Tim Griffin as Ralph
- Tommy Hinkley as Hardleg
- Nick Paonessa as Zoom
- Max Casella as Mack Steiner
- Mike O'Malley as Mickey
- Heather Goldenhersh as Belinda / Flapper
- Nick Bourdages as Bug
- Jeremy Ratchford as Eddie
- Alex Via as Scoreboard Keeper
- Cody Froelich as Scoreboard Keeper
- Bill Roberson as Mr. Dunn
- Blake Clark as Chicago Referee
- Marian Seldes as Clerk
- Ledisi Young as Blues Singer (performed song "The Man I Love")

== Production ==
Leatherheads began filming on February 12, 2007. Filming locations mainly included locations in Chattanooga, Tennessee, upstate South Carolina around Anderson, Greenville, Ware Shoals, Greer and Travelers Rest, as well as Boiling Springs and western North Carolina around Statesville, Greensboro and Winston-Salem, specifically at Hanes Middle School and the Winston-Salem Millennium Center. Additional train scenes were filmed in the Winston-Salem suburb of Tobaccoville, specifically in the community of Donnaha.

The crew and cast headquarters during the Winston-Salem scenes were based in the nearby town of East Bend, in Yadkin County, North Carolina. The football game scenes at the beginning and at the end of the picture were filmed at Memorial Stadium, near Central Piedmont Community College in Charlotte, North Carolina, with technical advisor T.J. Troup "teaching them the intricacies of 1920s football so that they look and sound like real players of the era."

Train scenes were filmed at the North Carolina Transportation Museum in Spencer, North Carolina and The Tennessee Valley Railroad Museum in Chattanooga, TN. Filming wrapped in mid-May 2007. After initially being set for release in December 2007, the studio moved the release date to April 4, 2008.

On March 24, George Clooney and Renée Zellweger premiered the film in Maysville, Kentucky, birthplace of Clooney's father and aunt, Nick Clooney and Rosemary Clooney. Clooney and Zellweger visited Duluth to promote the film.

The piano player bent over the tack piano with eyes glued to music is the composer of the original music in this film, Oscar-winning songwriter Randy Newman. The George and Ira Gershwin song "The Man I Love" is sung in the film but the song was not extant in 1925. It was "part of the 1927 score for the Gershwin antiwar musical satire Strike Up the Band".

== Reception ==
=== Box office ===
In its opening weekend, the film grossed $12.6 million in 2,769 theaters in the United States and Canada, ranking No. 3 at the box office behind the second weekend of 21 and fellow newcomer Nim's Island, below the expectations of Universal Studios. Viewers in their 50s to 80s were the main audience for the film. As of October 2013, the movie had made about $31.2 million from the United States and Canada and $10.1 million from other markets making a global total of $41.3 million. The budget for the film was $58 million.

=== Critical response ===
On Rotten Tomatoes, the film has an approval rating of 53% based on 168 reviews, with an average rating of 5.81/10. The website's critics consensus reads: "Despite a good premise and strong cast, this pro football romcom is half screwball and half fumble." On Metacritic, the film has a weighted average score of 56 out of 100, based on 34 critics, indicating "mixed or average" reviews. Audiences surveyed by CinemaScore gave the film an average grade of "C+" on scale of A+ to F.

Peter Travers of Rolling Stone wrote: "Leatherheads is most on its game when it's in the game, and in the zone of Clooney's no-bull affection for the faces of his actors." Kirk Honeycutt of The Hollywood Reporter wrote: "Clooney, the film's director and star, can't make up his mind how to approach the story. One minute it's a romantic comedy. Then it switches to slapstick, then to screwball comedy before sliding into Frank Capra territory." Todd McCarthy of Variety wrote: "Arch and funny in equal measure, this looks like a theatrical non-starter that Clooney fans and football devotees might be tempted to check out down the line on DVD or on the tube."

== Writing credits ==
In 2007, a Writers Guild of America arbitration vote decided not to award Clooney a screen credit for the film, preferring to credit only the original writers, longtime Sports Illustrated columnist Rick Reilly and his former magazine colleague, Duncan Brantley. In response to the WGA's ruling, Clooney resigned his full WGA status to go "financial core" within the guild, meaning that while still technically a member, he only has limited rights. While he did not contest the ruling of the WGA, Clooney said that he did not want to exclude Brantley and Reilly, agreeing that they deserved the first position credit for their work, but felt that his "major overhaul" of the 17-year-old script to turn it into a screwball comedy left only two of the original scenes intact.

Co-producer Grant Heslov stated that he thought the guild "made the wrong decision," saying, "This script that Duncan and Rick wrote sat languid until after we finished Good Night, and Good Luck... George liked Leatherheads but said it never felt quite right. He took it to Italy with him, and I remember when he called to say he thought he'd solved it. One thing that you clearly see, if you read the original, the subsequent drafts and then his draft, is that he wrote the majority of the film... We both thought Duncan and Rick would get first position credit, which they deserved. But this wasn't right."

Paul Attanasio also did uncredited re-writes on the film prior to Clooney taking over.
