= Davidson Taylor =

American radio announcer and broadcast executive (1907–1979)

James Davidson Taylor (February 26, 1907 – July 27, 1979) was a former radio announcer and broadcast executive who helped found Columbia University's School of the Arts, serving as its first director and later its first dean.

== Early life and education ==
The son of the Rev. Dr. James Arthur Taylor and the former Elizabeth D. "Lizzie" Forbes, he was born in Shelbyville, Tennessee. He grew up in Brookhaven, Mississippi, graduating from the local high school. Taylor attended Mississippi College, graduating in 1927. Intending to follow his father into the ministry, Taylor next pursued a master's degree in theology from Southern Baptist Theological Seminary in Louisville, Kentucky.

It was while attending the Southern Baptist Theological Seminary that Taylor had his first radio experience, singing on local station WHAS. A baritone, Taylor had sung in glee clubs in both high school and college.

== Career ==
For a time, Taylor was the pastor at the Fayette Baptist Church. Taylor began working as an announcer on WHAS, as well as writing in the local newspaper, the Courier-Journal.

In 1933 he began announcing for the Columbia Broadcasting System. Succeeding the resigning Fred Bethel, he became director of the CBS music division late in 1937. When Orson Welles and the Mercury Theatre were engaged by CBS in 1938, Taylor was initially named to oversee production of the new show, First Person Singular. In August 1938, Taylor became the assistant to the CBS vice president in charge of programs, William B. Lewis.

During the latter part of World War II, Taylor worked as an aide to CBS head William S. Paley, who was serving as a colonel in charge of the radio operations of the Psychological Warfare Division of the Supreme Headquarters Allied Expeditionary Force under General Dwight D. Eisenhower.

Upon returning to the U.S. in 1945, Taylor became vice president for programming in November, replacing Douglas Coulter. With the July resignation of Edward R. Murrow to return to broadcasting, Taylor took over as vice president and director of public affairs for CBS in 1947.

A 1948 trip on behalf of CBS proved extremely eventful for Taylor. Originally intended as a five-week visit with various European and near-Asian correspondents, Taylor wound up tangentially involved in several major news events over the period. In the early portion of his trip he was initially scheduled to fly on a British European Airways Viking airliner to Berlin: the aircraft was involved in a mid-air collision with a Soviet Air Force Yakovlev Yak-3 fighter aircraft. All ten passengers and four crew on board the Viking were killed, as was the Soviet pilot. While in Greece he would meet with correspondent George Polk, who would be murdered that May. Finally, he would spend time in Mandatory Palestine during the last days of Britain's mandate.

Taylor resigned from CBS late in 1949 following a major realignment of the network's operations, saying he did not feel he could work effectively under the changes. One of his final acts before resigning had been to hire Sig Mickelson, who would go on to become the first president of CBS News, from CBS corporate owned-and-operated radio station WCCO in Minneapolis.

He was appointed as a special consultant to the State Department in August 1950, charged with developing plans for the Voice of America radio network. Following this short-lived assignment, Taylor became a general production executive at NBC in January 1951.

In April 1959, Taylor was appointed as the director of Columbia University's arts center program. The arts center program at Columbia led to the establishment of the school of the arts in 1966, with Taylor being named director that May. Taylor would subsequently become the school's first dean in May, 1969. Budget cuts forced the closure of the theater arts division in 1971, and the removal of the remaining schools to Dodge Hall on the university's main campus. In September 1971, Taylor became Special Assistant to the President for Education in the Arts, with Frank MacShane becoming interim dean. Taylor retired from Columbia in 1975.

== Personal life and death ==
Taylor married Mary Elizabeth Plummer on June 8, 1935, in New York. He died on July 27, 1979 at the age of 72.
