= Vicious (play) =

- Original language: English
- Written by: Denis Spedaliere
- Characters: Sid Vicious
- Genre: Drama

Premiere
- Date: 1986

Vicious is an American play written by Denis Spedaliere about the life of Sex Pistols musician Sid Vicious that played in Los Angeles and at Chicago's Steppenwolf Theatre Company in 1986, and in Hollywood at The Complex theatre in 1991.

George Clooney played a male prostitute drug dealer in the 1986 run of the show.

== Critical reception ==
The Los Angeles Times said "Vicious is not only one of theater’s more unrelenting depictions of junkies losing their grip, but a classic dialectic of rock passion and rock biz."

== Retrospection ==
Years later looking back on his experience with Vicious, George Clooney told New York magazine "I was the comedy relief, believe it or not," Clooney said, who got an agent from the part. Clooney added "I always look back at that play as the turning point for me. That was the first time I really felt like, Okay, I’m in the right business. I shouldn’t be embarrassed about everything I do."
