= Hollywood Theatre Row =

District in Hollywood, California, United States

Hollywood Theatre Row is the official name for the district of Hollywood, California bounded roughly by McCadden Place and El Centro Ave and Lexington and Melrose Avenues, consisting of approximately 22 stages.

On June 1, 2015, City Councilmembers Mitch O'Farrell (CD13) and Tom LaBonge (CD4) along with actor French Stewart, The Blank Theatre Artistic Director Daniel Henning and several hundred community members unveiled the City of Los Angeles signage that officially created Hollywood Theatre Row as a "Live Theatre District."

It is also the core home of the Hollywood Fringe Festival each June, bringing thousands of audience members to Hollywood Theatre Row to see nearly 400 productions each year.

== Venues ==
- McCadden Place Theatre 1157 N McCadden Pl
- The Lex Theatre 6760 Lexington Ave
- The Village at Ed Gould Plaza 1125 N McCadden Pl
- National Comedy Theatre 733 Seward St
- Hudson Theatres 6539 Santa Monica Blvd
- The Blank’s 2nd Stage Theatre 6500 Santa Monica Blvd
- The Complex Theatres 6476 Santa Monica Blvd
- Studio C Artists 6448 Santa Monica Blvd
- Theatre Asylum 6320 Santa Monica Blvd
- Sacred Fools Theater Company 1076 Lillian Way
- The Lounge Theatre 6201 Santa Monica Blvd
- El Centro Theatre 804 N. El Centro Ave - currently under renovation
