= Sand and Sorrow =

Sand and Sorrow: A New Documentary about Darfur
- Directed by: Paul Freedman
- Written by: Paul Freedman
- Produced by: Paul Freedman; Bradley Kaplan
- Narrated by: George Clooney
- Edited by: Paul Freedman
- Music by: Jamie Dunlap
- Distributed by: HBO Documentary Films
- Release date: 2007
- Running time: 94 minutes
- Country: United States
- Language: English

Sand and Sorrow: A New Documentary about Darfur is a 2007 American documentary film about the Darfur crisis that is narrated and co-executive produced by George Clooney. The film is directed by Paul Freedman and uses interviews and footage of human rights activist John Prendergast, Harvard professor Samantha Power and New York Times columnist Nicholas Kristof to depict the origins and the aftermath of the conflict between the Arab and non-Arab tribes in the Darfur region.

== See also ==
- Timeline of the War in Darfur
- History of Darfur, for a broader view of the events that have caused the current conflict
- Bibliography of the Darfur conflict, for all external links to news coverage, documentaries, advocacy initiatives, and other research on the conflict
- International response to the Darfur conflict, for the response of individuals, organizations and governments to the conflict since 2003
