= George Clooney =

American actor and filmmaker (born 1961)

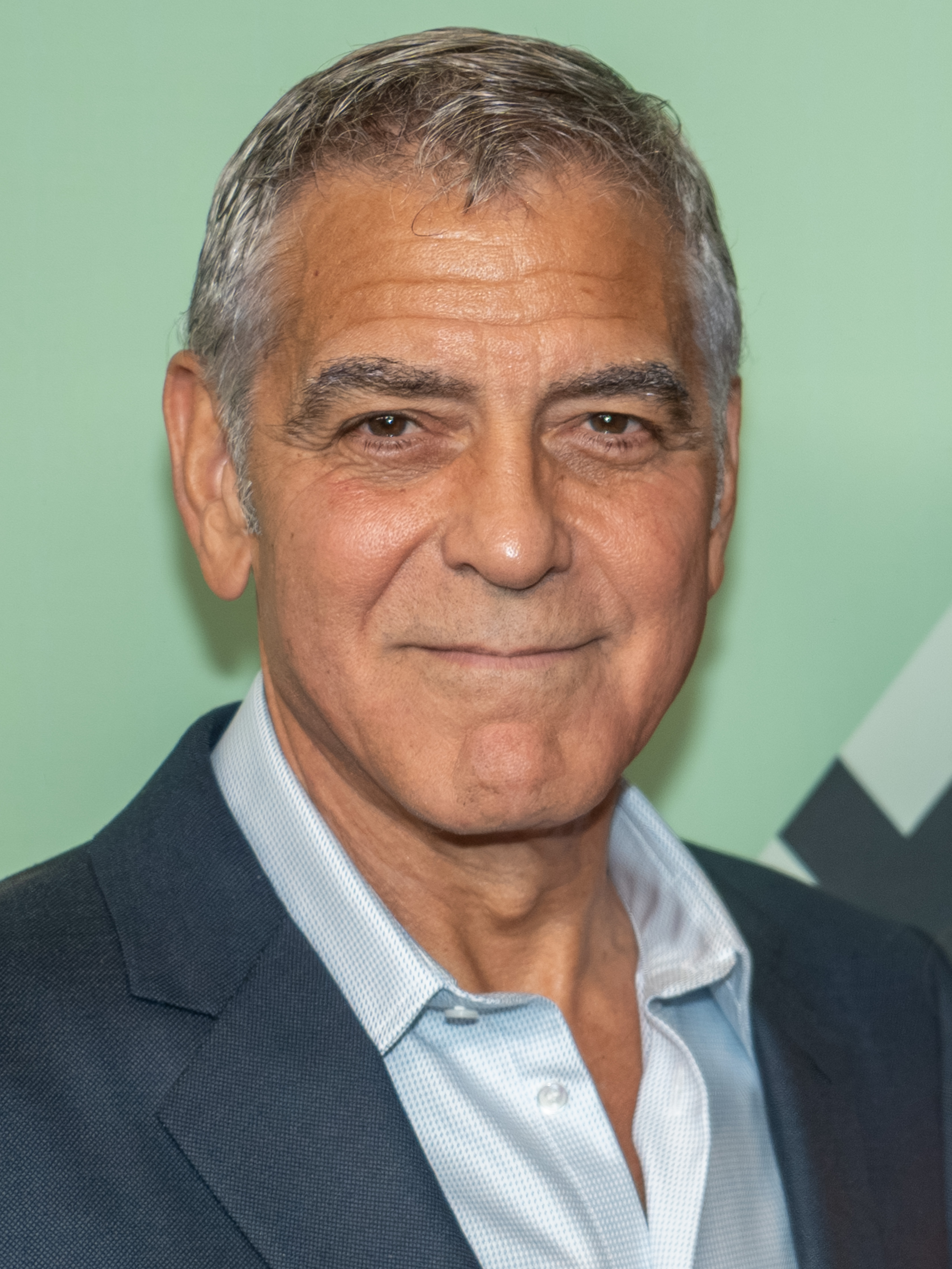
- Clooney in 2025
- Born: George Timothy Clooney; May 6, 1961 (age 65); Lexington, Kentucky, U.S.
- Citizenship: United States; France (since 2025)
- Occupations: Actor; film director; producer; screenwriter
- Years active: 1978–present
- Organizations: Smokehouse Pictures; Casamigos
- Works: Filmography
- Political party: Democratic
- Spouses: Talia Balsam (m. 1989; div. 1993); Amal Alamuddin (m. 2014)
- Children: 2
- Father: Nick Clooney
- Relatives: Rosemary Clooney (aunt); Miguel Ferrer (cousin); Betty Clooney (aunt); Tessa Ferrer (first cousin once removed)
- Awards: Full list

George Timothy Clooney (born May 6, 1961) is an American actor and filmmaker. Known for his leading man roles on screen in both blockbuster and independent films, Clooney has received numerous accolades, including two Academy Awards, a BAFTA Award and four Golden Globe Awards as well as nominations for three Primetime Emmy Awards and a Tony Award. His honors include the Cecil B. DeMille Award in 2015, the Honorary César in 2017, the AFI Life Achievement Award in 2018, the Kennedy Center Honor in 2022, and the Golden Lion for Lifetime Achievement.

Clooney's breakthrough came with his role as Dr. Doug Ross in the NBC medical drama ER (1994–1999), for which he received two Primetime Emmy Award nominations. He established himself as a film star with roles in From Dusk till Dawn (1996), Out of Sight (1998), Three Kings (1999), O Brother, Where Art Thou? (2000), and the Ocean's film series (2001–2007). He won the Academy Award for Best Supporting Actor for playing a CIA officer in Syriana (2005). He was Oscar-nominated for his roles in Michael Clayton (2007), Up in the Air (2009) and The Descendants (2011). He has also starred in Burn After Reading (2008), Fantastic Mr. Fox (2009), Gravity (2013), Hail, Caesar! (2016), and Jay Kelly (2025).

Clooney has directed nine feature films including the spy film Confessions of a Dangerous Mind (2002), the historical drama Good Night, and Good Luck (2005), the political drama The Ides of March (2011), the war film The Monuments Men (2014), and the coming-of-age film The Tender Bar (2021) starring Ben Affleck. He received the Academy Award for Best Picture for co-producing the political thriller Argo (2012). He made his Broadway debut portraying Edward R. Murrow in the play adaptation of his 2005 film Good Night, and Good Luck (2025), for which he earned a nomination for the Tony Award for Best Actor in a Play.

Clooney was included on Time's annual Time 100 list, which identifies the most influential people in the world, every year from 2006 to 2009. He is also noted for his political and economic activism, and has served as one of the United Nations Messengers of Peace since 2008. Clooney is also a member of the Council on Foreign Relations. He has been married since 2014 to human rights lawyer Amal Clooney, with whom he has two children. He and his wife became naturalized citizens of France in 2025.

== Early life ==
George Timothy Clooney was born on May 6, 1961, in Lexington, Kentucky. His mother, Nina Bruce (née Warren), was a beauty queen and city councilwoman. His father, Nick Clooney, is a former anchorman and television host, including five years on the AMC network. Clooney is predominantly of Irish descent. His direct ancestor Nicholas Clooney, a poor cottier from Windgap, County Kilkenny, was given little alternative but to leave Ireland, due to being driven out by the landowning class. Nicholas Clooney migrated to the United States in 1855, settling in Kentucky. His maternal fourth great-grandmother, Mary Ann Sparrow, was the half-sister of Nancy Lincoln, mother of President Abraham Lincoln, making Clooney and President Lincoln half-first cousins five times removed. Clooney had an older sister named Adelia (1960–2025). Cabaret singer and actress Rosemary Clooney was his aunt. Through Rosemary, his cousins include actors Miguel Ferrer, Rafael Ferrer, and Gabriel Ferrer.

Clooney was raised a strict Roman Catholic stating "yes, we were Catholic, big-time, whole family, whole group". He began his education at the Blessed Sacrament School in Fort Mitchell, Kentucky. After his family moved to Ohio he attended St. Michael's School in Worthington, Ohio, then Western Row Elementary School in Mason, Ohio, and finally St. Susanna School in Mason, where he served as an altar boy. The Clooneys moved back to Kentucky when he was midway through the seventh grade.

In middle school, Clooney developed Bell's palsy, a medical condition that partially paralyzes the face. The malady went away within a year. In an interview with Larry King, he stated that "yes, it goes away. It takes about nine months to go away. It was the first year of high school, which was a bad time for having half your face paralyzed." He also described one positive outcome of the condition:

It's probably a great thing that it happened to me because it forced me to engage in a series of making fun of myself. And I think that's an important part of being famous. The practical jokes have to be aimed at you.

After moving to Augusta, Kentucky, Clooney attended Augusta High School. He has stated that he earned all As and a B in school, and played baseball and basketball. He tried out to play professional baseball with the Cincinnati Reds in 1977, but he did not pass the first round of player cuts and was not offered a contract. He attended Northern Kentucky University from 1979 to 1981, majoring in broadcast journalism, and very briefly attended the University of Cincinnati, but did not graduate from either. He worked odd jobs selling women's shoes, selling insurance door to door, stocking shelves, working in construction, and cutting tobacco.

== Career ==
=== Early work (1978–1993) ===
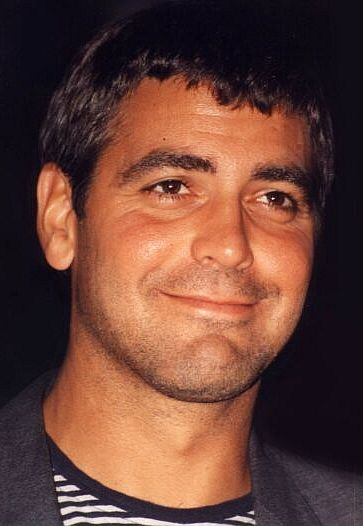
Clooney in 1995

Clooney's first role was as an extra in the television miniseries Centennial in 1978, which was based on the novel of the same name by James A. Michener and was partly filmed in Clooney's hometown of Augusta, Kentucky. Clooney's first major role came in 1984 in the short-lived CBS sitcom E/R (not to be confused with ER, the long-running medical drama). He played a handyman on the series The Facts of Life and appeared as Bobby Hopkins, a detective, on an episode of The Golden Girls. In 1986, Clooney made his theater debut in the play Vicious about Sex Pistols musician Sid Vicious.

Clooney's first prominent role was a semi-regular supporting role in the sitcom Roseanne, playing Roseanne Barr's supervisor Booker Brooks, followed by the role of a construction worker on Baby Talk, a co-starring role on the CBS drama Bodies of Evidence as Detective Ryan Walker, and then a year-long turn as Det. James Falconer on Sisters. In 1988, Clooney played one of the lead roles in the comedy-horror film Return of the Killer Tomatoes. In 1990, he starred in the ABC police drama Sunset Beat. During this period, Clooney was a student at the Beverly Hills Playhouse acting school for five years.

=== Breakthrough and stardom (1994–1999) ===
Original cast of ER (1994–1995), with Clooney third from the left

Clooney rose to fame when he played Dr. Doug Ross, alongside Anthony Edwards, Julianna Margulies, Eriq LaSalle and Noah Wyle, in the hit NBC medical drama ER from 1994 to 1999. ER was a cultural phenomenon and is now considered one of the all-time greatest television shows. It was the most-watched show in television for three years — in its second, third and fifth seasons — and average viewing figures often exceeded 30 million. At its peak, the show attracted 47.8 million viewers. After leaving the series in 1999, he made a cameo appearance in the sixth season and returned for a guest spot in the show's final season. For his work on the series, Clooney received two Primetime Emmy Award nominations for Outstanding Lead Actor in a Drama Series in 1995 and 1996. He also earned three Golden Globe Award nominations for Best Actor – Television Series Drama in 1995, 1996, and 1997 (losing to co-star Anthony Edwards).

Clooney began appearing in films while working on ER. His first major Hollywood role was in the horror comedy-crime thriller From Dusk till Dawn, directed by Robert Rodriguez and co-starring Harvey Keitel. He followed its success with the romantic comedy One Fine Day with Michelle Pfeiffer, and the action-thriller The Peacemaker with Nicole Kidman. Clooney was then cast as Batman in Joel Schumacher's Batman & Robin, which was a modest box office performer, but a critical failure (with Clooney himself calling the film "a waste of money"). In 1998, he co-starred in the crime-comedy Out of Sight opposite Jennifer Lopez, marking the first of his many collaborations with director Steven Soderbergh. He also starred in Three Kings during the last weeks of his contract with ER.

While ER was a hit, he expanded to form two production companies. The first production company he founded was Mirador Entertainment in February 1996, with former ABC vice president Deborah Leoni later serving as partner in July 1996, of which the company signed a two-year deal with NBC via the NBC Studios production company. The second he founded was Maysville Pictures (formerly Left Bank Productions, which was renamed due to a conflict with the music management firm), named for his home town, with partner Robert Lawrence, and signed a three-year deal with Warner Bros. Pictures in November 1996. In 1998, the NBC deal was replaced by a new TV deal for Maysville Pictures with Warner Bros. Television and CBS, shortly before leaving ER, and rendered Mirador Entertainment defunct. In order to expand Maysville into the television business, the company hired Ben Cosgrove, Pam Williams (who runs the TV side) and Kevin Field to run the company. In September 1999, Clooney split from producer Robert Lawrence in the Maysville partnership. After the success of Out of Sight, Clooney next supplanted Maysville Pictures with Section Eight Productions at a deal with Warner Bros. Pictures.

=== Leading man and directorial debut (2000–2004) ===
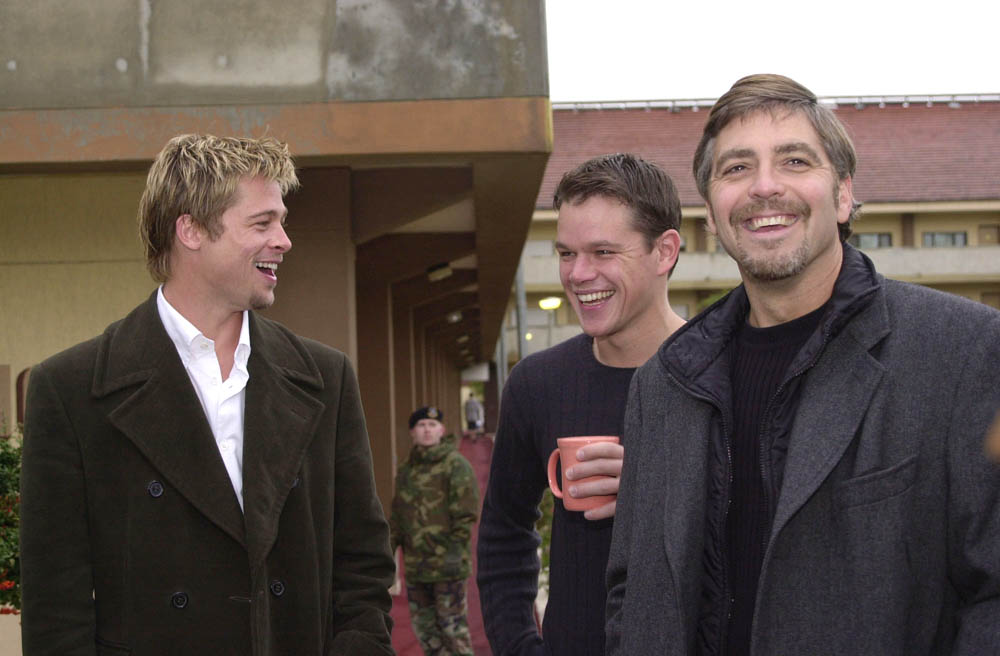
Brad Pitt, Matt Damon and Clooney in 2001 promoting Ocean's Eleven in Turkey

After leaving ER, Clooney starred in commercially successful films including Wolfgang Petersen's disaster film The Perfect Storm (2000) which was a box office success. The same year he starred in the Coen brothers adventure comedy O Brother, Where Art Thou? (2000) alongside John Turturro, Tim Blake Nelson and John Goodman. The film, a modern satire, is loosely based on Homer's epic Greek poem the Odyssey and the Preston Sturges 1941 classic film Sullivan's Travels. This film is set in 1937 rural Mississippi during the Great Depression. He plays escaped convict Ulysses Everett McGill. He received a Golden Globe Award for Best Actor – Motion Picture Musical or Comedy nomination for his performance. Variety critic Todd McCarthy compared Clooney to Clark Gable, writing: "Not for the first time recalling Clark Gable in his looks and line delivery, Clooney clearly delights in embellishing Everett's vanity and in delivering the Coens' carefully calibrated, high-toned dialogue".

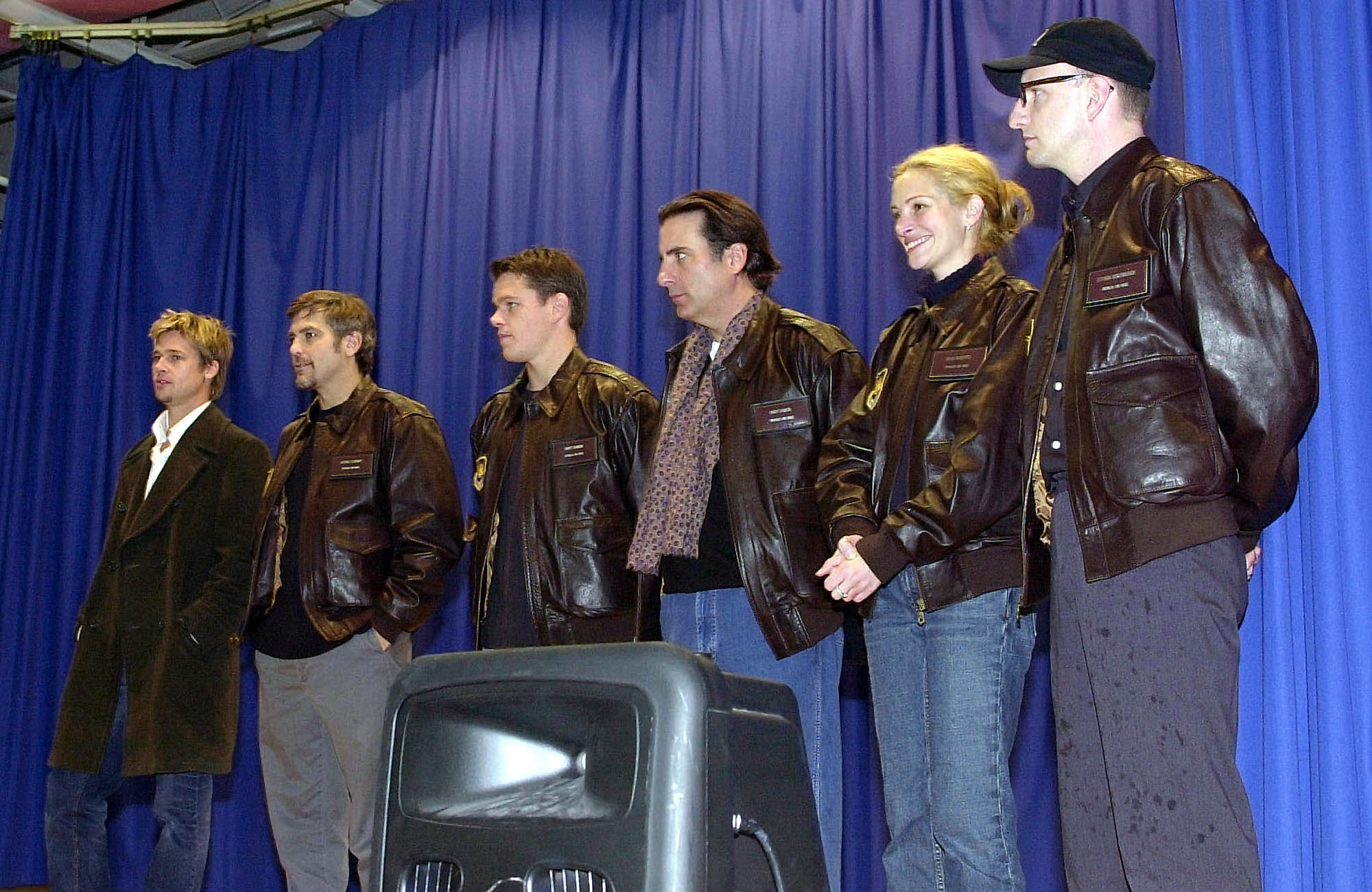
Brad Pitt, Clooney, Matt Damon, Andy Garcia, Julia Roberts and Steven Soderbergh publicize Ocean's Eleven (2001)

The following year in 2001, Clooney reunited with Soderbergh for the heist comedy Ocean's Eleven, a remake of the 1960s Rat Pack film of the same name, with Clooney playing Danny Ocean, originally portrayed by Frank Sinatra. The film starred Clooney, Brad Pitt, Julia Roberts, Matt Damon and Andy Garcia. The film cemented Clooney as a leading film star. It is Clooney's most successful film with him in the lead role, earning $451 million worldwide (he appeared, but did not star, in Gravity, which has a $723 million worldwide box office). Ocean's Eleven inspired two sequels starring Clooney, Ocean's Twelve in 2004 and Ocean's Thirteen in 2007. In 2001, Grant Heslov was hired as director of development for Section Eight Productions.

The following year he would work with Soderbergh yet again in the science fiction drama Solaris (2002) an adaptation of the acclaimed 1972 film directed by Andrei Tarkovsky. Roger Ebert praised the film and Clooney, writing: "Clooney has successfully survived being named People magazine's sexiest man alive by deliberately choosing projects that ignore that image. His alliance with Soderbergh, both as an actor and co-producer, shows a taste for challenge." That same year Clooney made his directorial debut in the 2002 film Confessions of a Dangerous Mind, based on the autobiography of TV producer Chuck Barris. The film premiered out of competition at the Cannes Film Festival to critical acclaim. Though the film did not do well at the box office, critics stated that Clooney's directing showed promise.

In 2003, Clooney reunited with the Coen brothers in the romantic comedy Intolerable Cruelty opposite Catherine Zeta-Jones. Elvis Mitchell of The New York Times praised their chemistry and the casting of Clooney in the role writing, "the good work comes from George Clooney, who happens to have the Art Deco profile fit for a 1930s comedy. He scores with his willingness to mock his above-average charisma level and the chiseled chin, cover-guy good looks".

=== Established star and acclaim (2005–2013) ===
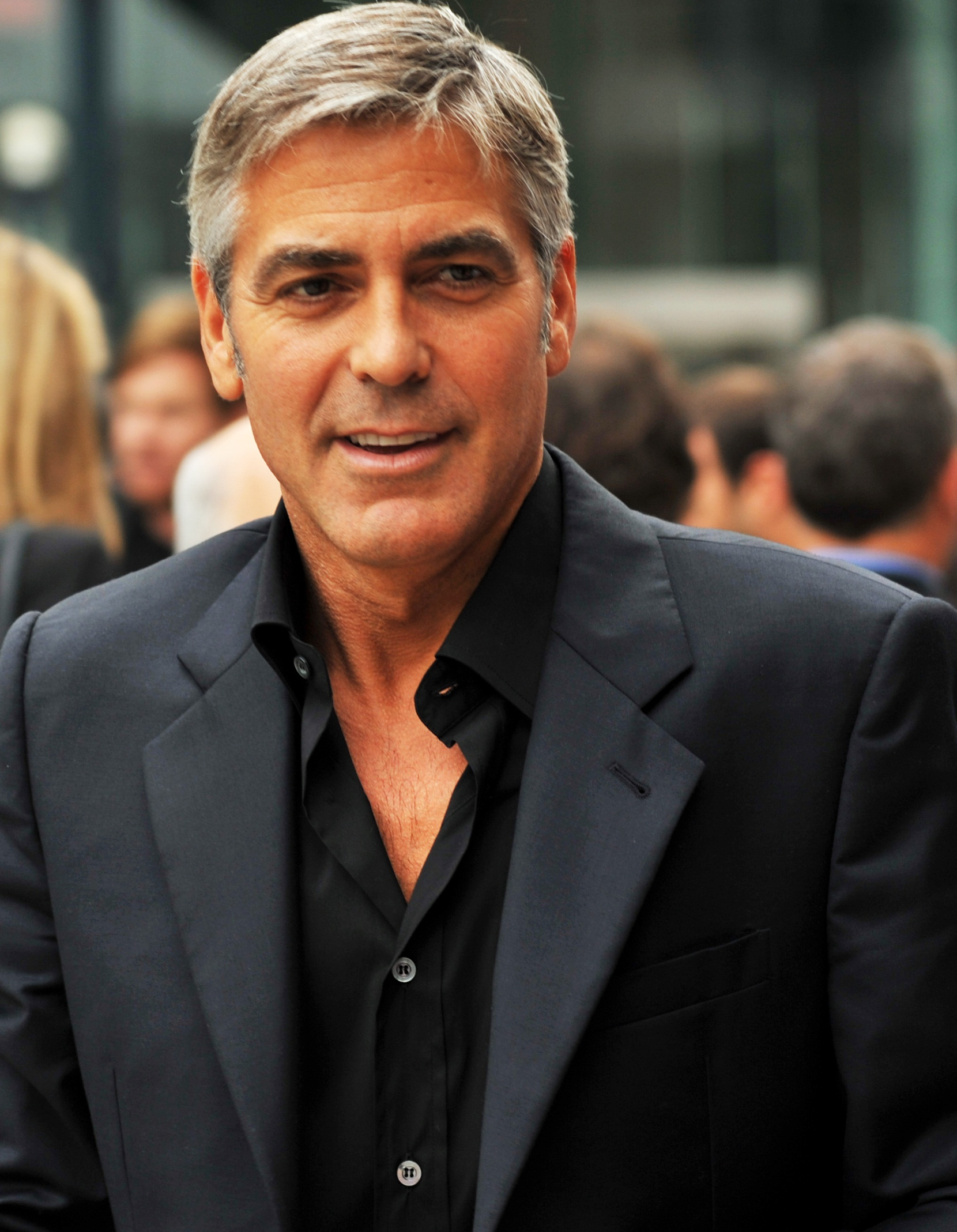
Clooney attending the premiere of The Men Who Stare at Goats at the 2009 Toronto International Film Festival

In 2005, Clooney starred in Syriana, which was based loosely on former Central Intelligence Agency agent Robert Baer's memoirs of his service in the Middle East. Clooney suffered an accident on the set of Syriana, which caused a brain injury with complications from a punctured dura. The same year he directed, produced, and starred in Good Night, and Good Luck, a film about 1950s television journalist Edward R. Murrow's famous war of words with Senator Joseph McCarthy. At the 2006 Academy Awards, Clooney was nominated for Best Director and Best Original Screenplay for Good Night, and Good Luck, as well as Best Supporting Actor for Syriana. He won the Oscar for his role in Syriana.

Clooney next appeared in The Good German (2006), a film noir directed by Soderbergh that is set in post-World War II Germany. In August 2006, Clooney and Heslov started the production company Smokehouse Pictures, which supplanted Section Eight. In October 2006, Clooney received the American Cinematheque Award, which honors someone in the entertainment industry who has made "a significant contribution to the art of motion pictures". On January 22, 2008, Clooney was nominated for an Academy Award for Best Actor for Michael Clayton (2007) losing to Daniel Day-Lewis who won for Paul Thomas Anderson's drama There Will Be Blood (2007).

Later that year, he directed his third film, Leatherheads, in which he also starred. On April 4, 2008, Variety reported that Clooney had quietly resigned from the Writers Guild of America over a dispute concerning Leatherheads. Clooney, who is the director, producer and star of the film, claimed that he had contributed in writing "all but two scenes" of it, and requested a writing credit alongside Duncan Brantley and Rick Reilly, who had worked on the screenplay for 17 years. Clooney lost an arbitration vote 2–1, and withdrew from the union over the decision. He became a "financial core status" non-member, meaning he no longer has voting rights, and cannot run for office or attend membership meetings, according to the Writers Guild of America's constitution.

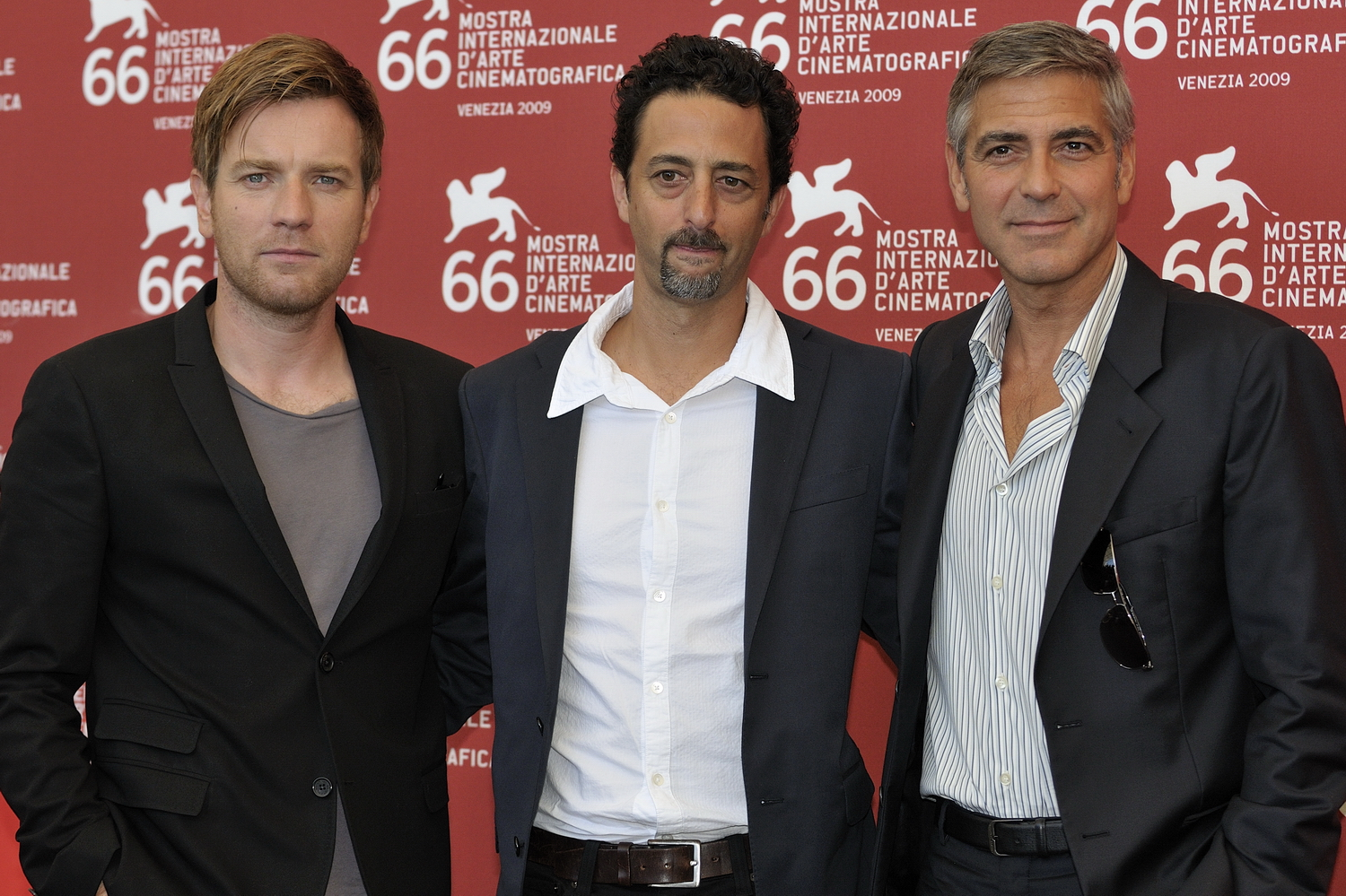
Ewan McGregor, Grant Heslov and Clooney at the Venice International Film Festival in 2009

In 2009, he starred in the war comedy The Men Who Stare at Goats alongside Ewan McGregor, Jeff Bridges and Kevin Spacey. The film was directed by Heslov and released in November 2009. The film premiered at the Venice International Film Festival to positive reviews. Also in November 2009, he voiced the title character opposite Meryl Streep as Mrs. Fox in Wes Anderson's animated feature Fantastic Mr. Fox. The same year, Clooney starred in the Jason Reitman directed comedy-drama Up in the Air, which was initially given limited release, and then a wide release on December 25, 2009. Stephen Farber of The Hollywood Reporter praised Clooney's performance, writing: "Boasting one of George Clooney's strongest performances, the film seems like a surefire awards contender". For his performance in the film he was nominated for a Golden Globe, a Screen Actors Guild Award, BAFTA and an Academy Award. The following year, Clooney produced and starred in the dark crime drama The American (2010), based on the novel A Very Private Gentleman by Martin Booth and directed by Anton Corbijn.

As of 2011, Clooney was represented by Bryan Lourd, co-chairman of Creative Artists Agency (CAA). In 2011, Clooney starred in The Descendants as a husband whose wife has an accident that leaves her in a coma. He earned critical praise for his work, and won the Broadcast Film Critics Association Award for Best Actor and the Golden Globe Award for Best Actor – Motion Picture Drama. Also, he was nominated for the Screen Actors Guild for Best Actor, the BAFTA Award for Best Actor, and the Academy Award for Best Actor. He was nominated for the Academy Award for Best Adapted Screenplay for the political drama The Ides of March.

In 2013, Clooney won the Golden Globe Award for Best Motion Picture – Drama, the BAFTA Award for Best Picture and the Academy Award for Best Picture for producing Argo. The following year, Clooney co-starred with Sandra Bullock in Gravity (2013), a space thriller directed by Alfonso Cuarón.

In 2013, Clooney co-founded Casamigos Tequila with Rande Gerber and Michael Meldman. It was sold to Diageo for $700 million in June 2017, with an additional $300 million possible depending on the company's performance over the next ten years. According to the Forbes annual ranking, he was the world's highest-paid actor for 2017–2018, earning $239 million between June 1, 2017, and June 1, 2018.

=== Focus on directing and Broadway debut (2014–present) ===
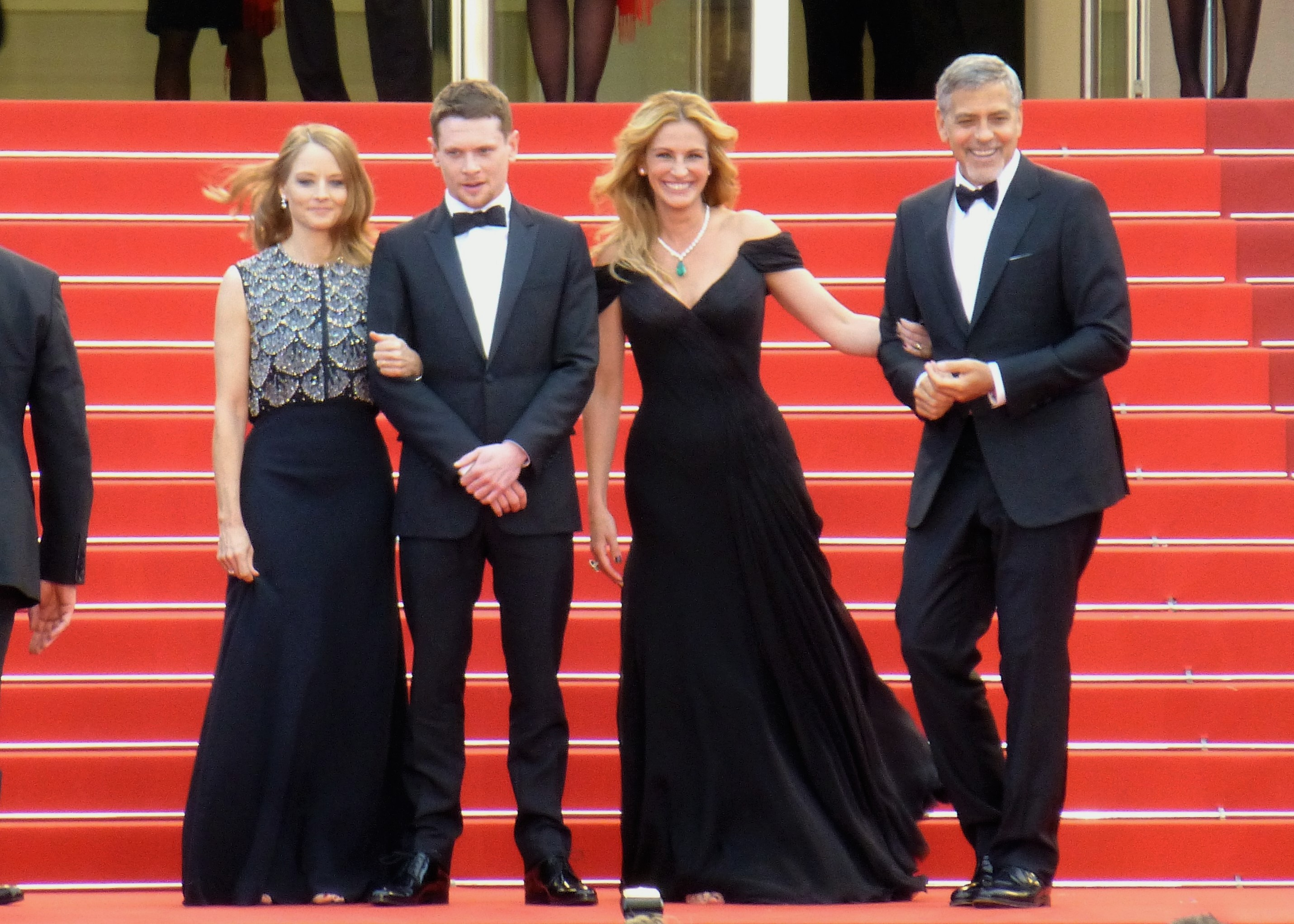
Jodie Foster, Jack O'Connell, Julia Roberts and Clooney at the 2016 Cannes Film Festival for Money Monster

In 2014, Clooney co-wrote, directed and starred in The Monuments Men, an adaptation of The Monuments Men: Allied Heroes, Nazi Thieves and the Greatest Treasure Hunt in History by Robert M. Edsel. The film starred an ensemble cast of A-list stars including Matt Damon, Cate Blanchett, Bill Murray, John Goodman and Bob Balaban, as well as European stars Hugh Bonneville and Jean Dujardin. The film was a critical misfire and a box-office failure. Many historians were critical of the film for its historical inaccuracies. The Guardian's film critic Andrew Pulver panned the film, writing that the film was "filled with unearned patriotic sentiment, sketchy to the point of inanity, and interrupted every few minutes with neurotic self-justification". In the same year Clooney produced August: Osage County (2013), an adaptation of the play of the same title. The film stars Meryl Streep and Julia Roberts.

His next film was Tomorrowland (2015), a science fiction adventure film in which he played Frank Walker, an inventor. Later in the year, he was featured as himself in the Netflix Christmas musical comedy A Very Murray Christmas, starring Bill Murray. The following year, he starred in Hail, Caesar!, a comedy from the Coen brothers set in the Hollywood film industry in the 1950s, which premiered in February 2016. Clooney portrayed Baird Whitlock, a Robert Taylor-type film star who is kidnapped during the production of a film. Josh Brolin co-starred as fixer Eddie Mannix. Clooney reunited with Julia Roberts for the Jodie Foster-directed thriller Money Monster (2016), playing the host of a television show that investigates conspiracies on commerce and Wall Street, who is taken hostage by a bankrupt viewer given a bad tip.

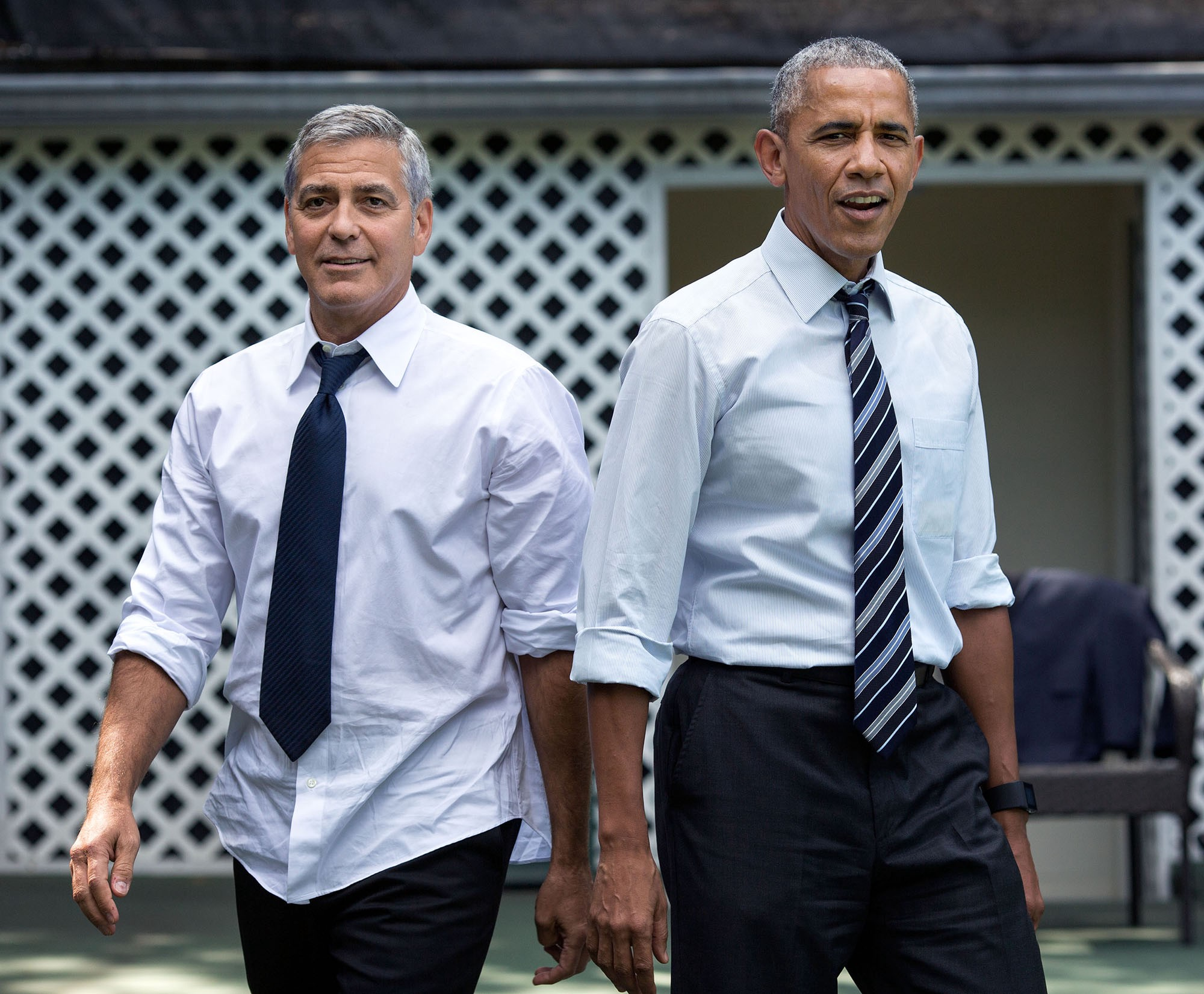
Clooney with President Barack Obama in 2016

In October 2017, his directorial project Suburbicon a 1950s-set crime comedy was released. It stars Matt Damon, Julianne Moore and Oscar Isaac, from a script written by the Coen brothers in the 1980s, that they had originally intended to direct themselves. He received the 2018 AFI Life Achievement Award on June 7, 2018. The award was presented to him by Shirley MacLaine, and was honored by Julianna Margulies, Cate Blanchett, Bill Murray, Anna Kendrick, Jimmy Kimmel, Jennifer Aniston, Courteney Cox and his wife Amal Clooney. In 2019, Clooney returned to television, starring, directing and producing the Hulu historical miniseries Catch-22, based upon the novel of the same name by Joseph Heller. Clooney was initially cast in a main role in the series; however, he opted to take a smaller supporting role instead. The series premiered on May 31, 2019, to critical acclaim.

After a four-year absence from acting in film, Clooney starred in the science fiction film The Midnight Sky—a film he also directed and produced, based upon the Lily Brooks-Dalton debut novel Good Morning, Midnight, for Netflix. He co-starred opposite Felicity Jones and David Oyelowo. The film received mixed reviews and was a financial flop. It went on to receive a nomination for the Academy Award for Best Visual Effects. He also directed The Tender Bar, based upon the memoir of the same name by J. R. Moehringer, for Amazon Studios with Ben Affleck in the lead. The coming-of-age film had its nationwide premiere on December 22, 2021, and began streaming on Amazon Prime Video on January 7, 2022. Despite receiving mixed reviews from critics, the film earned Affleck Screen Actors Guild Award and Golden Globe Award nominations for Best Supporting Actor.

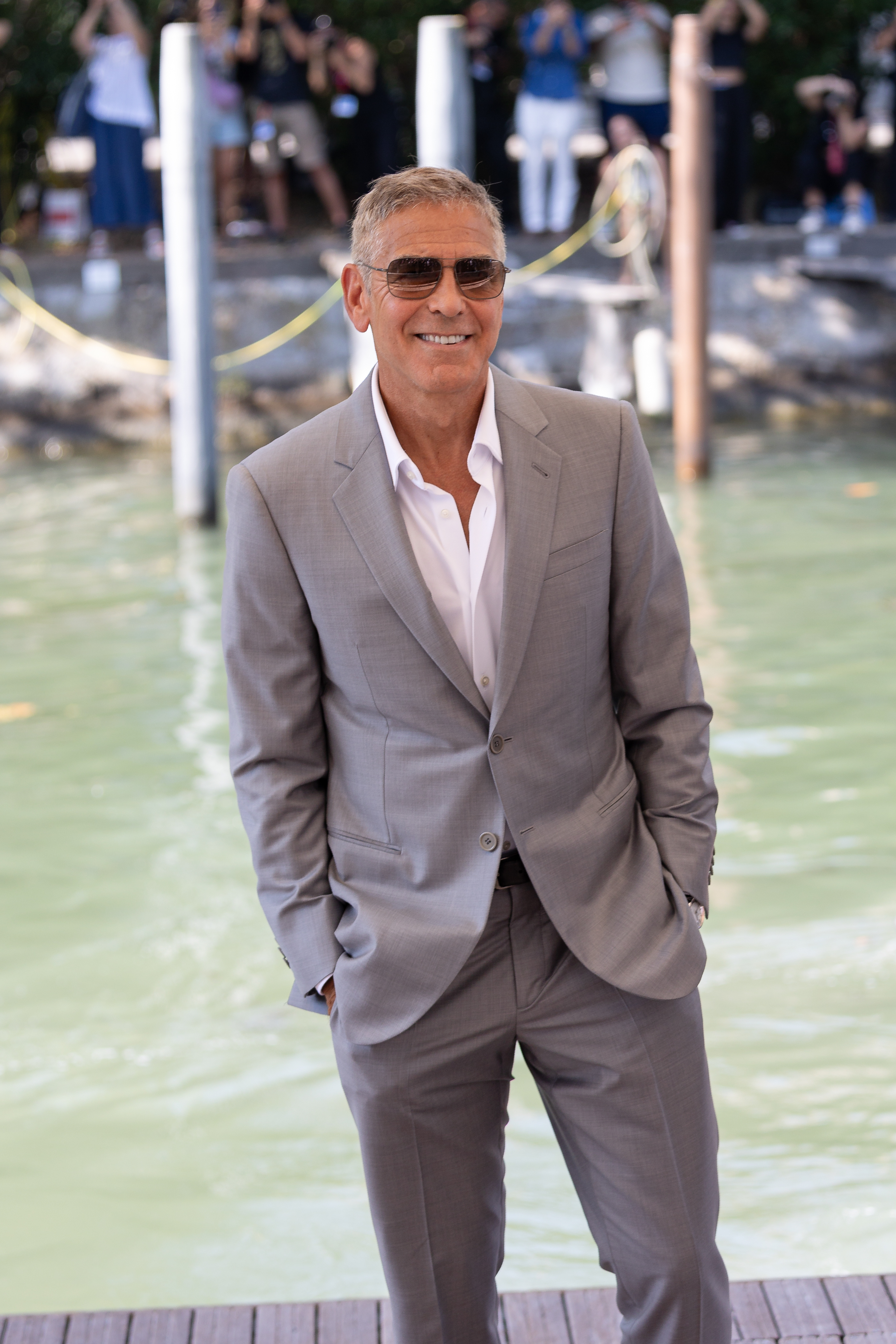
Clooney at the 81st Venice International Film Festival

In February 2021, The Hollywood Reporter reported that Clooney's Smokehouse Pictures would be teaming with Sports Illustrated Studios and 101 Studios to produce a docuseries about the Ohio State University abuse scandal, and that the series would be based on an October 2020 Sports Illustrated article by Jon Wertheim. HBO announced in June 2022 that the documentary, now a feature-length film, had started production with a planned debut on HBO and HBO MAX. The film, titled Surviving Ohio State, was released on June 17, 2025.

In 2022, he reunited with Julia Roberts for a romantic comedy film Ticket to Paradise directed by Ol Parker. It was initially set to release in theatres on September 30, 2022, but was pushed by a month to October 21, 2022. In 2023, Clooney reprised the role of Bruce Wayne / Batman in a cameo in The Flash. Clooney next film as a director was the biographical sports drama The Boys in the Boat which was released on December 25, 2023. The film starred Callum Turner and Joel Edgerton and received mixed reviews. The film was based on the book of the same name by Daniel James Brown.

Clooney re-teamed with Brad Pitt for the Apple TV+ thriller film Wolfs (2024) written and directed by Jon Watts which premiered to positive reviews at the Venice International Film Festival. In 2025, Clooney made his Broadway debut as an actor in the stage adaption of Good Night, and Good Luck where he is currently portraying Edward R. Murrow. He and Grant Heslov also serve as the playwrights having adapted the play from their 2005 film of the same name. The production received mostly positive reviews with critics praising Clooney's performance, his sincerity to the material, its timely subject matter, and its lavish scenic design. Jesse Green of The New York Times praised Clooney's performance describing it as being full of "wit, integrity and charming modesty." Sara Holden of Vulture wrote, "Clooney - probably the closest thing contemporary Hollywood has to a Cary Grant - carries [a] sense of responsibility onto the stage". The production was nominated for five Tony Awards including Best Actor in a Play for Clooney. The production was aired live, the first for a Broadway show, and was shown on CNN and HBO and was a ratings success. In 2025, Clooney starred alongside Laura Dern and Adam Sandler in the Noah Baumbach dramedy Jay Kelly from Netflix.

== Activism and public advocacy ==
=== Political views ===
Clooney supported both of Barack Obama's 2008 and 2012 presidential campaigns. Clooney endorsed Hillary Clinton for the 2016 presidential election.

Clooney has also made humorous statements against Republican Party figures. In 2006, Clooney sarcastically thanked Jack Abramoff at the 63rd Golden Globe Awards before concluding with "Who would name their kid 'Jack' with 'off' at the end? No wonder the guy's screwed up." Clooney has also described Republican donor Steve Wynn as an "asshole" and a "jackass", after the two had a heated disagreement over the Affordable Care Act.

=== Relationship with Joe Biden ===
Clooney endorsed Joe Biden for the 2020 presidential election, and he hosted a virtual fundraiser for Biden together with Obama in July 2020. In a July 2024 op-ed for The New York Times, Clooney called for Biden to withdraw from the 2024 presidential election after a debate in which Biden had underperformed, with many critics citing his age as a significant factor. Clooney wrote of his friendship with Biden, saying: "I love Joe Biden. As a senator. As a vice president and as president. I consider him a friend, and I believe in him. Believe in his character. Believe in his morals. In the last four years, he's won many of the battles he's faced." However, he stated that, "I saw Biden three weeks ago at my fundraiser for him. It's devastating to say it, but he is not the same man he was, and he won't win this fall." In the piece he called for there to be a new nominee, citing a possible primary at the Democratic National Convention.

In 2025, while promoting his Broadway play Good Night, and Good Luck, Clooney stated that he stood by his choice in writing the op-ed, saying: "I was raised to tell the truth. I feel as if there was a lot of profiles in cowardice in my party. I was not proud of that. I also believed I had to tell the truth."

=== Humanitarian work ===
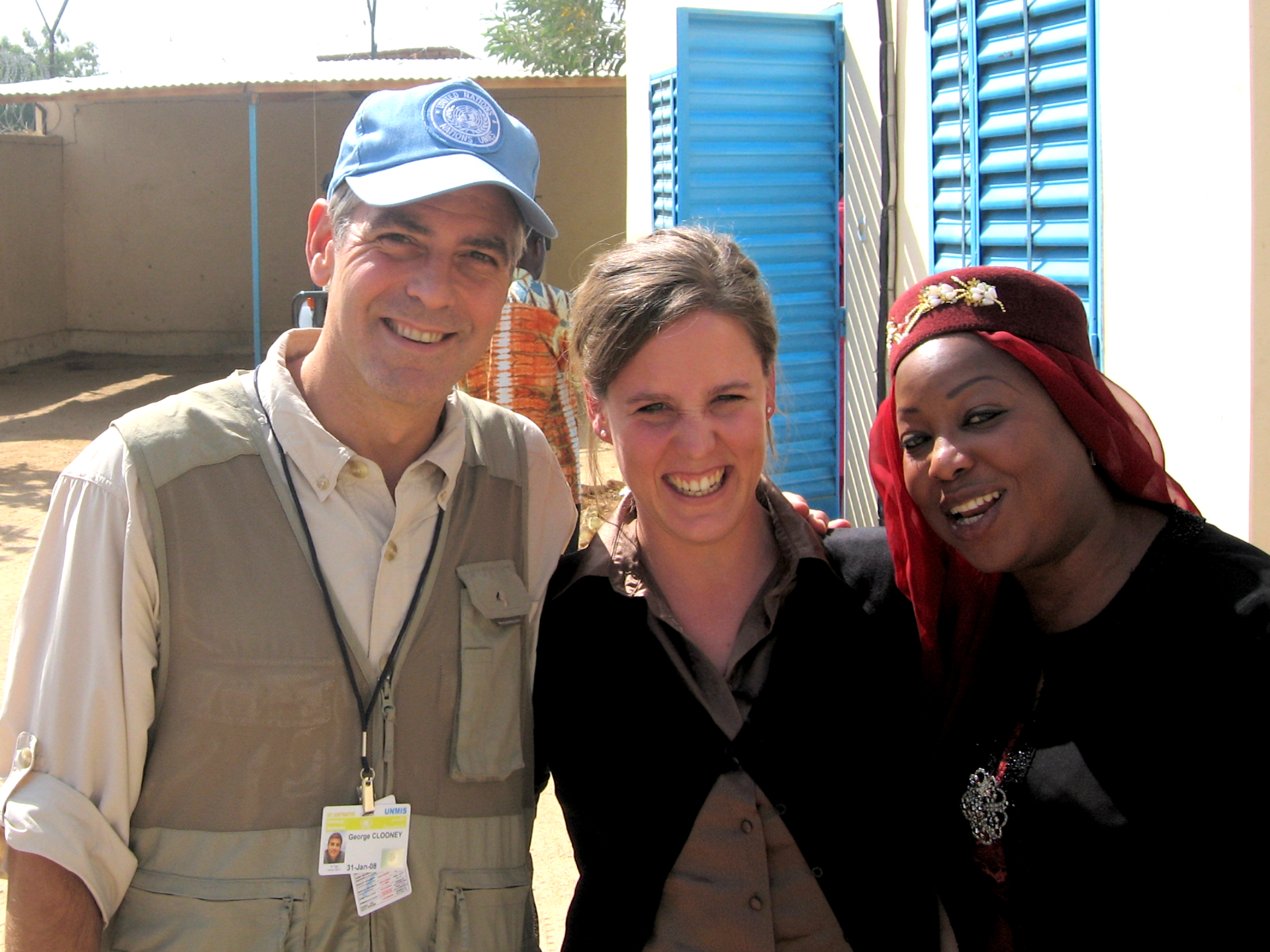
Clooney in Abéché, Chad, in January 2008 with the United Nations

Clooney is involved with Not On Our Watch Project, an organization that focuses global attention and resources to stop and prevent mass atrocities, along with Brad Pitt, Matt Damon, Don Cheadle, David Pressman and Jerry Weintraub. In February 2009, he visited Goz Beida, Chad, with New York Times columnist Nicholas D. Kristof. In January 2010, he organized the telethon Hope for Haiti Now, which collected donations for the 2010 Haiti earthquake victims.

In March 2012, Clooney starred with Martin Sheen and Brad Pitt in a performance of Dustin Lance Black's play 8—a staged reenactment of the federal trial that overturned California's Prop 8 ban on same-sex marriage—as attorney David Boies. The production was held at the Wilshire Ebell Theatre and broadcast on YouTube to raise money for the American Foundation for Equal Rights. In September 2012, Clooney offered to take an auction winner out to lunch to benefit the Gay, Lesbian and Straight Education Network (GLSEN). GLSEN works to create a safe space in schools for children who are or may be perceived to be gay, lesbian, bisexual or transgender.

On August 7, 2020, George and Amal Clooney donated $100,000 to three Lebanese charities after the capital, Beirut, was left devastated by a deadly explosion. They donated money to the Lebanese Red Cross, Impact Lebanon, and Baytna Baytak. The blast claimed the lives of at least 145 people and injured more than 5,000.

=== War in Darfur (Sudan) ===
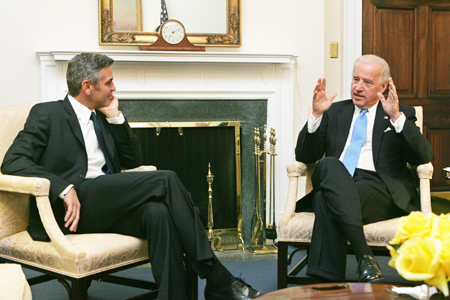
Clooney with Vice President Joe Biden in 2009

Clooney has advocated a resolution of the Darfur conflict. He spoke at a 2006 Save Darfur rally in Washington, D.C. In April 2006, he spent ten days in Chad and Sudan with his father to make the TV special A Journey to Darfur reflecting the situation of Darfur's refugees, and advocated for action. The documentary was broadcast on American cable TV as well as in the UK and France. In 2008, it was released on DVD, with the sale proceeds being donated to the International Rescue Committee. In September of the same year, he spoke to the UN Security Council with Nobel Prize-winner Elie Wiesel to ask the UN to find a solution to the conflict and to help the people of Darfur. In December, he visited China and Egypt with Don Cheadle and two Olympic winners to ask both governments to pressure Sudan's government.

On March 25, 2007, he sent an open letter to German Chancellor Angela Merkel, calling on the European Union to take "decisive action" in the region given the failure of Sudan President Omar al-Bashir to respond to UN resolutions. He narrated and was co-executive producer of the 2007 documentary Sand and Sorrow. Clooney also appeared in the documentary film Darfur Now, a call-to-action film released in November 2007 for people all over the world to help stop the Darfur crisis. In December 2007, Clooney and fellow actor Don Cheadle received the Summit Peace Award from the Nobel Peace Prize Laureates in Rome. In his acceptance speech, Clooney said that "Don and I ... stand here before you as failures. The simple truth is that when it comes to the atrocities in Darfur ... those people are not better off now than they were years ago." On January 18, 2008, the United Nations announced Clooney's appointment as a UN messenger of peace, effective January 31.

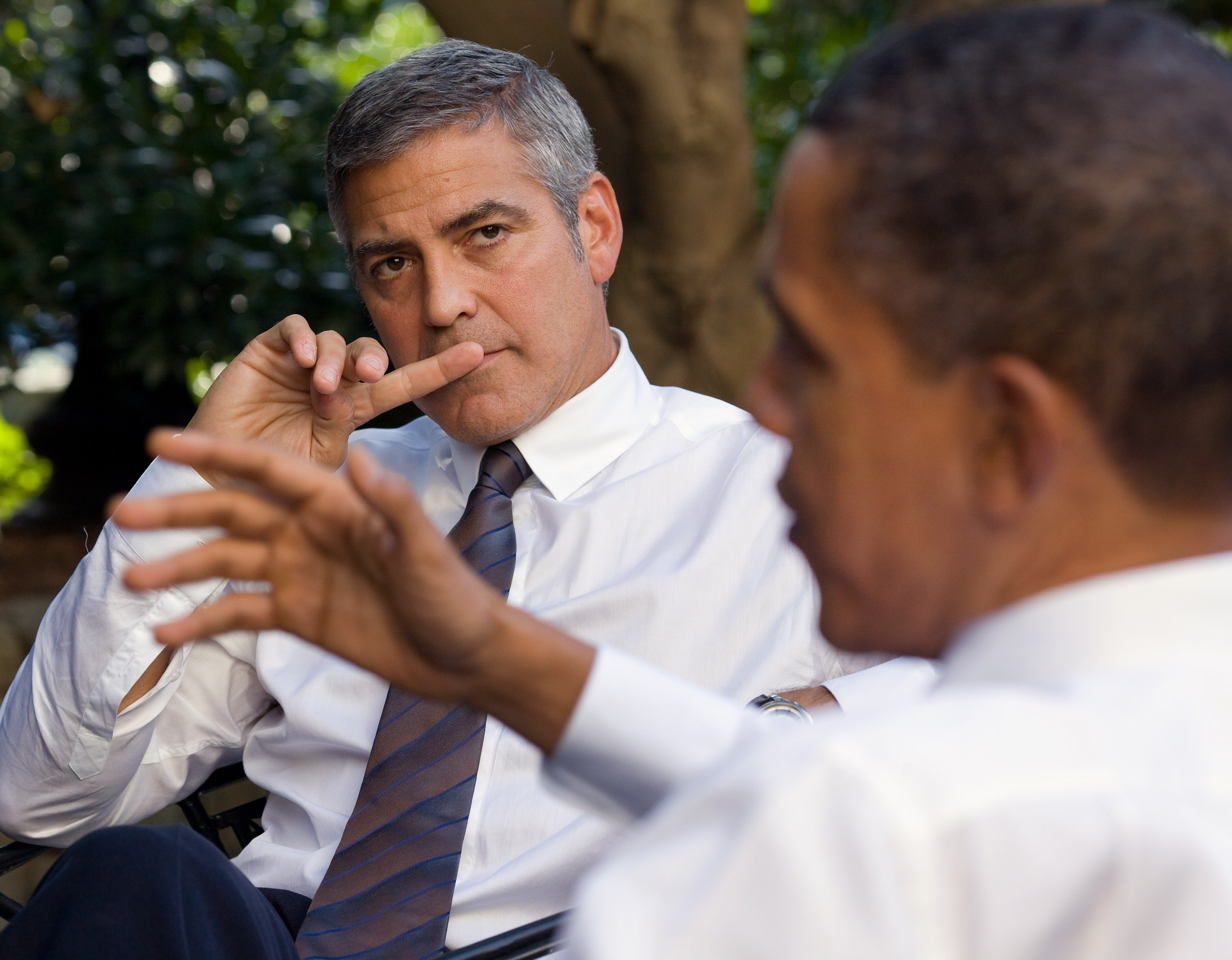
Clooney discusses Sudan with President Barack Obama at the White House in October 2010

Clooney conceived of and, with John Prendergast—human rights activist, co-founder of the Enough Project, and Strategic Advisor for Not on Our Watch Project—initiated the Satellite Sentinel Project (SSP), after an October 2010 trip to South Sudan. SSP aims to monitor armed activity for signs of renewed civil war between Sudan and South Sudan, and to detect and deter mass atrocities along the border regions there.

Clooney and Prendergast co-wrote a Washington Post op-ed piece in May 2011, titled "Dancing with a dictator in Sudan", arguing that:

President Omar al-Bashir has been indicted by the International Criminal Court for genocide, is escalating bombing and food aid obstruction in Darfur, and he now threatens the entire north-south peace process ... the evidence shows that incentives alone are insufficient to change Khartoum's calculations. International support should be sought immediately for denying debt relief, expanding the ICC indictments, diplomatically isolating the regime, suspending all non-humanitarian aid, obstructing state-controlled bank transactions and freezing accounts holding oil wealth diverted by senior regime officials.

On March 16, 2012, Clooney was arrested outside the Sudanese Embassy for civil disobedience. He intended to be arrested when he planned the protest. Several other prominent participants were also arrested, including Martin Luther King III. Clooney has been described as one of the most strident critics of Omar al-Bashir.

=== Armenian genocide recognition ===
Clooney supports recognition of the Armenian genocide. He is one of the chief associates of the 100 Lives Initiative, a project which aims to remember the lives lost during the event. As part of the initiative, Clooney launched the Aurora Prize, which awards to those who risk their lives to prevent genocides and atrocities. Clooney had also urged various American government officials to support the United States' recognition of the Armenian Genocide. He also visited Armenia to commemorate the 101st anniversary of the event in April 2016. Clooney has also attended the 2017 film premiere for The Promise, a movie about the Armenian genocide.

=== Syrian refugees ===
In May 2015, Clooney told the BBC that the Syrian conflict was too complicated politically to get involved in, and he wanted to focus on helping the refugees. In March 2016, he and his wife Amal met with Syrian refugees living in Berlin to mark the fifth anniversary of the conflict, before meeting with German chancellor Angela Merkel to thank her for Germany's open-door policy.

=== U.S. gun control ===
In 2018, following the Stoneman Douglas High School shooting, the Clooneys pledged $500,000 to the March for Our Lives and said they would be in attendance.

=== LGBTQ rights ===
Clooney is a supporter of LGBTQ rights. On March 28, 2019, Clooney wrote an open letter calling for the boycott of the Sultan of Brunei's hotels over a new law that came into force on April 3, 2019, that punishes homosexual sex and adultery with death by stoning. Clooney lists nine hotels including The Dorchester, 45 Park Lane, Coworth Park, The Beverly Hills Hotel, Hotel Bel-Air, Le Meurice, Hotel Plaza Athenee, Hotel Eden and Hotel Principe di Savoia and asks readers to consider how "we are putting money directly into the pockets of men who choose to stone and whip to death their own citizens for being gay or accused of adultery."

=== Support for homelessness charity ===
In 2015, Clooney visited an Edinburgh charity cafe run by Social Bite which caters to the needs of homeless individuals. He chatted to cafe workers, ate a sandwich and donated $1000 to the charity. Clooney supported the charity again in 2026, along with Bob Geldof. Social Bite co-founder Josh Littlejohn told the Scotsman newspaper that Clooney's 2015 visit had been "transformational" for the charity.

== Personal life ==
=== Relationships ===
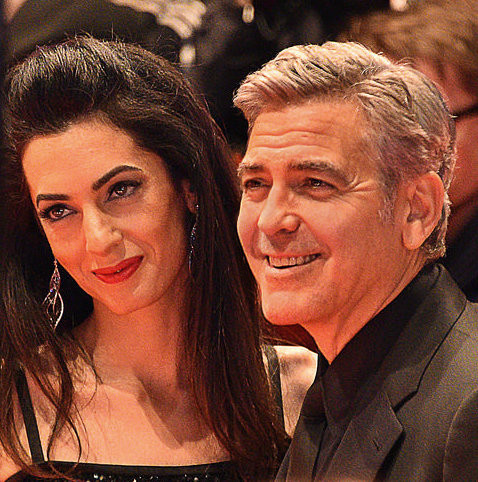
George and Amal Clooney at the 66th Berlin International Film Festival in Germany in 2016

Clooney dated actress Kelly Preston from 1987 to 1989. During this relationship, he purchased a Vietnamese pot-bellied pig named Max as a gift for Preston, but when their relationship ended, Clooney kept the pig for an additional 18 years until Max died in 2006. He has jokingly referred to Max as the longest relationship he had ever had.

Clooney was married to actress Talia Balsam from 1989 to 1993. During his marriage, he was also seeing with actress Ginger Lynn Allen. Clooney dated both Cameron Diaz and Frances Fisher in 1995. From 1996 to 1999, he went out with French reality TV personality Céline Balitran. The following year, he was linked to Charlize Theron and Lucy Liu, and entered in a five-year on-again, off-again relationship with British model Lisa Snowdon. Clooney also dated Renée Zellweger (2001), Jennifer Siebel Newsom (2002) Krista Allen (2002–2008), and Linda Thompson (2006). In June 2007, he started seeing reality personality Sarah Larson, but the couple had broken up by May 2008. In July the following year, Clooney entered in a relationship with Italian actress Elisabetta Canalis, which ended in June 2011. A month later, Clooney started seeing former WWE personnel Stacy Keibler; they split up in July 2013.

In October 2013, Clooney was seen having dinner with British-Lebanese human rights lawyer Amal Alamuddin. They became engaged on April 28, 2014. In a subsequent interview, Clooney said they had forged a strong bond because of their interest in campaigning work, and particularly over the issue of the Elgin Marbles. Acting for the government of Greece, Alamuddin supported their return from the British Museum, while he, promoting his film The Monuments Men, had also argued for this and had been criticised by the then Mayor of London, Boris Johnson.

In July 2014, Clooney publicly mocked British tabloid newspaper the Daily Mail after it claimed his fiancée's mother opposed their marriage on religious grounds. When the tabloid issued an apology for the false story, Clooney refused to accept it. He called the paper "the worst kind of tabloid. One that makes up its facts to the detriment of its readers." On August 7, 2014, Clooney and Alamuddin obtained marriage licenses at the Royal Borough of Kensington and Chelsea of the United Kingdom and were officially married on September 27, 2014, at Ca' Farsetti in Venice, Italy. Clooney's friend Walter Veltroni, the former mayor of Rome, was the officiant.

In 2015, Clooney and Alamuddin adopted a rescue dog, a Basset Hound named Millie, from the San Gabriel Valley Humane Society.

On February 9, 2017, the CBS talk show, The Talk, reported that Alamuddin was pregnant with twins. She gave birth to daughter Ella and son Alexander George on June 6, 2017. In 2020, Clooney revealed to Jimmy Kimmel and Graham Norton on their respective talk shows that the twins could speak Italian fluently, despite neither he nor his wife speaking the language.

In February 2024, Clooney gifted Alamuddin a Saint Bernard puppy called Nelson for her birthday.

In 2025, Clooney joked he was raising his children on a farm in France. He, his wife, and their children acquired French citizenship on December 27, 2025.

=== Real estate ===
Clooney has property in Los Angeles. He purchased the 7,354-square-foot (683.2 m^{2}) house in 1995 through his George Guilfoyle Trust. His home in Italy is in the village of Laglio, on Lake Como, near the former residence of Italian author Ada Negri. Clooney also owns a home in Los Cabos, Mexico, that is part of a compound of villas with Cindy Crawford and Rande Gerber called "Casamigos". The homes were designed by the firm of Ricard Legorreta, one of Mexico's pre-eminent architects.

In 2014, Clooney and his wife Amal Alamuddin bought the Grade II listed Mill House on an island in the River Thames at Sonning Eye in Oxfordshire, England at a cost of around £10 million. In May 2021, The Economic Times reported Clooney plans to buy a vineyard near the village of Brignoles, in France, which includes an 18th-century manor with its own swimming pool and a tennis court.

=== Motorcycle accidents ===
On September 21, 2007, Clooney and then-girlfriend Sarah Larson were injured in a motorcycle accident in Weehawken, New Jersey, when his motorcycle was hit by a car. The driver of the car reported that Clooney attempted to pass him on the right, while Clooney said that the driver signaled left and then decided to make an abrupt right turn and clipped his motorcycle. On October 9, 2007, more than two dozen staff at Palisades Medical Center were suspended without pay for looking at Clooney's medical records in violation of federal law.

On July 10, 2018, Clooney was hit by a car while riding a motorcycle to a film set in Sardinia. He was hospitalized with minor injuries.

=== Sports ===
Growing up around Cincinnati, Clooney is a fan of the Cincinnati Bengals and Cincinnati Reds. He tried out for the Reds in 1977. Clooney is also an association football fan and supports EFL Championship club Derby County.

=== Relationship with the media ===
In November 2021, Clooney wrote an op-ed to British tabloid The Daily Mail, petitioning them to stop publishing photos of his children, highlighting that his wife is an international lawyer who works "confronting and putting on trial terrorist groups" and that the tabloid was endangering their lives. In 2014, Clooney had rejected an apology from the Daily Mail for printing a false story, calling the Mail the "worst kind of tabloid."

=== Crazy Mountain ===
Crazy Mountain is an American non-alcoholic beer brand launched in 2026 by Clooney, Rande Gerber, and Michael Meldman. The brand sells lager-style non-alcoholic beer brewed in the United States. In September 2026, Crazy Mountain raised a $15 million seed funding round led by CAVU Consumer Partners, with additional participation from Coatue and Discovery Land Company.

Crazy Mountain was launched in 2026 by Clooney, Gerber, and Meldman, who had previously co-founded Casamigos Tequila. According to the founders, they developed the brand in response to increased consumer interest in non-alcoholic beverages. Crazy Mountain is marketed as a non-alcoholic lager-style brew. At launch, it was sold in two varieties, Original and Lime. According to the company website, the beer is brewed in the United States. It is reported that a 12-ounce contains about 65 calories.

== In the media ==
Clooney has appeared in commercials outside the U.S. for Fiat, Nespresso, Martini vermouth, Omega, Warburtons and DNB ASA Eiendom (a Norwegian bank and real estate agency). Clooney was named one of Time's 100 Most Influential People in the World in 2007, 2008 and 2009. He is sometimes described as one of the most handsome men in the world. In 2005, TV Guide ranked Clooney No. 1 on its "50 Sexiest Stars of All Time" list. The cover story in a February 2008 issue of Time was headlined with: "George Clooney: The Last Movie Star".

He was parodied in the South Park episode "Smug Alert!", which criticizes his acceptance speech at the 78th Academy Awards, which The Atlantic called "arrogant, smug, and condescending." Clooney has also lent his voice to South Park as Sparky the Dog in "Big Gay Al's Big Gay Boat Ride" and as the emergency room doctor in South Park: Bigger, Longer & Uncut. Clooney was caricatured in the American Dad! episode "Tears of a Clooney", in which Francine Smith plans to destroy him.

Clooney at the 83rd Venice International Film Festival

== Acting credits and accolades ==
During his career, Clooney has won two Academy Awards, one for Best Supporting Actor for his role in Syriana and one for Best Picture as one of the producers for Argo, as well as a BAFTA and a Golden Globe. As of 2023, he is one of two people to have been nominated for Academy Awards in six different categories. For his role in The Descendants, he won a Golden Globe Award and was nominated for an Academy Award, BAFTA Award, Satellite Award, and two Screen Actors Guild Awards: Best Lead Actor and Best Cast. In 2015, Clooney was awarded the Golden Globe Cecil B. DeMille Lifetime Achievement Award. In 2025, he was honored with a Theatre World Award for his performance in Good Night, and Good Luck on Broadway. In the following year, he was honored with the Golden Lion for Lifetime Achievement at the 83rd Venice International Film Festival.

== Publications ==
- "The Key to Making Peace in Africa" for Foreign Affairs, by George Clooney and John Prendergast
- "I Love Joe Biden. But We Need a New Nominee" for The New York Times, by George Clooney

== See also ==
- List of atheists in film, radio, television and theater
