= Good Night, and Good Luck =

2005 historical drama film

Good Night, and Good Luck.
- Theatrical release poster
- Directed by: George Clooney
- Written by: George Clooney; Grant Heslov
- Produced by: Grant Heslov
- Starring: David Strathairn; Patricia Clarkson; George Clooney; Jeff Daniels; Robert Downey Jr.; Frank Langella
- Cinematography: Robert Elswit
- Edited by: Stephen Mirrione
- Production companies: 2929 Entertainment; Participant Productions; Section Eight Productions; Davis Films; Redbus Pictures; Tohokushinsha
- Distributed by: Warner Independent Pictures (United States); Redbus Film Distribution (United Kingdom); Metropolitan Filmexport (France); Tohokushinsha (Japan)
- Release dates: September 1, 2005 (Venice); October 7, 2005 (United States); January 4, 2006 (France); February 19, 2006 (United Kingdom); April 29, 2006 (Japan)
- Running time: 93 minutes
- Countries: United States; France; United Kingdom; Japan
- Language: English
- Budget: $7 million
- Box office: $54.6 million

Good Night, and Good Luck (stylized as good night, and good luck.) is a 2005 historical drama film directed by George Clooney from a screenplay he wrote with Grant Heslov, who also produced. It stars David Strathairn, Patricia Clarkson, Clooney, Jeff Daniels, Robert Downey Jr. and Frank Langella, and portrays the conflict between veteran journalist Edward R. Murrow (Strathairn) and U.S. Senator Joseph McCarthy of Wisconsin, especially concerning the anti-communist Senator's actions regarding the Senate Permanent Subcommittee on Investigations.

Although released in black and white, it was filmed on color film stock, but on a grayscale set, and was color-corrected to black and white during post-production. It focuses on the theme of media responsibility, and also addresses what occurs when U.S. journalism offers voices of dissent from government policy. The movie takes its title (which ends with a period or full stop) from the line with which Murrow used to sign off his broadcasts.

The film was a box office success and received critical acclaim for Clooney's direction, the writing, cinematography, production design and performances (particularly Strathairn's). It was nominated for six Academy Awards, including Best Picture, Best Director and Best Actor for Strathairn.

== Plot ==
On October 25, 1958, at a gathering entitled 'A Salute to Edward R Murrow', Ed Murrow delivers a speech where he mentions Senator McCarthy among others. The film then reverts to October 14, 1953, in the CBS Studios, with on-screen titles explaining that McCarthy has claimed that there are over 200 Communists in the US government.

Fred Friendly and the news team discuss the latest news stories for the forthcoming episodes, and Murrow declares that he wants to go after the American military, who have tried and convicted a member of the Air Force, Milo Radulovich, because his sister and father have been accused of being communist sympathizers. Murrow mentions that the charges against Radulovich were in a sealed envelope and that nobody saw them, suggesting that they investigate the story to see if it is worth covering.

Five days later Friendly, Murrow, and Sig Mickelson, CBS director, watch footage of CBS correspondent Joseph Wershba interviewing Milo Radulovich; Mickelson criticizes the report as being unbalanced and accuses the reporter of editorializing. Military men come to Friendly's office, attempting to persuade him not to broadcast the story, but CBS goes ahead and the segment features on Murrow's show See It Now.

The focus of the news team shifts to going after McCarthy himself. In one clip, McCarthy accuses a man who was provided with an attorney by the American Civil Liberties Union (ACLU) in 1932 of being a communist.

During the segment on McCarthy, Murrow personally invites the Senator on the show to defend the claims made about his corrupt influence. As the story continues, Murrow challenges McCarthy's questioning techniques, and the untruths he espouses in his hearings. Murrow notes that the ACLU is not on the list that McCarthy claims it to be, and that it has in fact been commended by several U.S. presidents.

Shirley Wershba reads out mostly favorable reports from the newspaper, but one journalist, Jack O'Brian, accuses Don Hollenbeck, a CBS journalist, of being a "pinko" (communist sympathizer). The team is informed that the Air Force has reinstated the wrongfully terminated Radulovich.

McCarthy appears on the show on April 6, 1954, and addresses the camera directly without interruption, accusing Murrow of being a communist, something that Murrow suspected would happen. In the proceeding show, Murrow gives his response, where he unequivocally denies the accusation that he was a member of the Communist Party and highlights that anyone who criticizes or opposes Senator McCarthy's methods is accused of being a communist. From this point on, the tide turns on McCarthy and he himself is investigated, due to charges the Army has made against him and his operation. John Aaron later announces this in the newsroom, but the celebration is cut short when a phone call to Friendly informs the news team that Hollenbeck has committed suicide by gassing himself.

Footage is shown of the Army–McCarthy hearings, where Joseph Welch, the Army's special counsel, questions McCarthy's sense of decency. Shortly after, CBS chief executive Paley speaks with Murrow and Friendly in his office and tells them they have lost one of their major sponsors, and as a result, he will only give them five more one-hour episodes and also move their slot from Tuesday night to Sunday afternoon. Paley speaks to Friendly privately and informs him that he needs to fire some people. At the same time, Mickelson calls Joe and Shirley Wershba to his office: He knows they are secretly married and that their co-workers had always known, in violation of CBS's policy forbidding marriage between colleagues. With layoffs coming, he asks that one of them choose to be laid off to save face. Joe volunteers to be let go.

Murrow finishes his speech from the opening scene, extolling the importance of ideas and information, and that television's potential of informing and enlightening its audience shouldn't be discounted, else it will become "merely wires and lights in a box." Murrow concludes his speech with his catchphrase, "Good night, and good luck."

== Cast ==
- David Strathairn as Edward R. Murrow, journalist and host of the CBS television program See It Now
- Patricia Clarkson as Shirley Wershba
- George Clooney as Fred W. Friendly, co-producer with Murrow of See It Now
- Robert Downey Jr., as Joseph Wershba, writer, editor, and correspondent for CBS News
- Frank Langella as William Paley, chief executive of CBS
- Jeff Daniels as Sig Mickelson, director of CBS News
- Tate Donovan as Jesse Zousmer
- Ray Wise as Don Hollenbeck, journalist for CBS News; accused in the press of being a "pinko"
- Helen Slayton-Hughes as Mary
- Alex Borstein as Natalie
- Thomas McCarthy as Palmer Williams
- Rose Abdoo as Mili Lerner
- Reed Diamond as John Aaron
- Matt Ross as Eddie Scott
- Grant Heslov as Don Hewitt, director of See It Now
- Glenn Morshower as Colonel Anderson
- Don Creech as Colonel Jenkins
- Robert John Burke as Charlie Mack
- Robert Knepper as Don Surine
- Dianne Reeves as Jazz Singer
- JD Cullum as Stage Manager
- Peter Jacobson as Jimmy
- Simon Helberg as CBS Page
- Joseph McCarthy (archive footage) as himself
- Liberace (archive footage) as himself
- Roy Cohn (archive footage) as himself
- Dwight D. Eisenhower (archive footage) as himself

== Production ==
In September 2005, Clooney explained his interest in the story to an audience at the New York Film Festival: "I thought it was a good time to raise the idea of using fear to stifle political debate." Having majored in journalism in college, Clooney was well-versed in the subject matter. His father, Nick Clooney, was a television journalist for many years, appearing as an anchorman in Cincinnati, Ohio; Salt Lake City, Utah; Los Angeles, California; and Buffalo, New York. The elder Clooney also ran for Congress in 2004.

George Clooney was paid $1 each for writing, directing, and acting in Good Night, and Good Luck, which cost $7.5 million to make. Due to an injury he received on the set of Syriana a few months earlier, Clooney could not pass the tests to be insured. He then mortgaged his own house in Los Angeles to make the film. Dallas Mavericks owner Mark Cuban and former eBay president Jeffrey Skoll invested money in the project as executive producers. The film ultimately grossed more than $54 million worldwide.

The CBS offices and studios seen in the movie were all sets on a sound stage. To accomplish a pair of scenes showing characters going up an elevator, different "floors" of the building were laid out on the same level. The "elevator" was actually built on a large turntable at the intersection of the two floor sets and rotated once the doors were closed. When the doors reopened, the actors appeared to be in a different location. In doing so, the movie exercised a bit of dramatic license—the CBS executive offices at the time were located at 485 Madison Avenue. CBS News was located in an office building just north of Grand Central Terminal (demolished and now the site of the MetLife Building); and the See It Now studio was located in Grand Central Terminal itself, above the waiting room. For dramatic effect, all three areas were depicted as being in the same building.

Clooney and producer Grant Heslov decided to use only archival footage of Joseph McCarthy in his depiction. As all of that footage was black-and-white, that determined the color scheme of the film. A young Robert F. Kennedy is also shown in the movie during McCarthy's hearing sessions. Kennedy was then a staff member on the Senate subcommittee chaired by McCarthy.

One complaint about the film among test audiences was their belief the actor playing McCarthy was exaggerated or unrealistic in his performance, not realizing the film used actual archive footage of McCarthy himself.

== Music ==
A small jazz combo starring jazz singer Dianne Reeves was hired to record the soundtrack to the movie. This combo (Peter Martin, Christoph Luty, Jeff Hamilton and Matt Catingub) was featured in the movie in several scenes; for example, in one scene the newsmen pass a studio where she is recording with the rest of the band. The CD is Dianne Reeves's second featuring jazz standards (including "How High the Moon", "I've Got My Eyes on You", "Too Close For Comfort", "Straighten Up and Fly Right" and "One for My Baby"), and it won the Grammy Award in 2006 for Best Jazz Vocal Album. The soundtrack to Good Night, and Good Luck was released on September 27, 2005.

== Reception ==
=== Critical reception ===
On review aggregator Rotten Tomatoes, the film holds an approval rating of 93% based on 226 reviews, with an average rating of 8.1/10. The website's critics consensus states: "A passionate and concise cinematic civics lesson, Good Night, and Good Luck has plenty to say about today's political and cultural climate, and its ensemble cast is stellar." On Metacritic, the film has a weighted average score of 80 out of 100 based on 41 critics, indicating "generally favorable" reviews.

Roger Ebert, in his 4-star review for the Chicago Sun-Times, praised the performances and direction and said the film is nearly claustrophobic in its overall atmosphere. In summary, Ebert declared: "the movie is not really about the abuses of McCarthy, but about the process by which Murrow and his team eventually brought about his downfall (some would say his self-destruction). It is like a morality play, from which we learn how journalists should behave. It shows Murrow as fearless, but not flawless." Margaret Pomeranz and David Stratton from the Australian Broadcasting Corporation's film review show At the Movies each gave the film five stars, making Good Night, and Good Luck the only other film besides Brokeback Mountain to receive such a score from the hosts in 2005. Both described the film as "beautiful", but also praised Clooney for the film's importance. Pomeranz commented that, "[The film] is so important, because it's about things that are really vital today, like the responsibility of the press and examining the press' role in forming opinion." David noted: "Though [the film] is in black-and-white, there's nothing monochromatic about Clooney's passion for his subject or the importance of his message."

Jack Shafer, a columnist then working for online magazine Slate, accused the film of continuing what he characterizes as the hagiography of Murrow. Clooney's film gives the impression Murrow brought down McCarthy single-handedly, while Shafer notes how in reality the senator's downfall was "much more complex" and included widespread condemnation from much of the mainstream media, many prominent Democrat politicians and some Republicans. Furthermore, Shafer writes, while McCarthy's allegations against individuals were never substantiated there was evidence obtained via the declassified Venona espionage program which confirmed many Soviet agents and sympathizers were in fact in positions of influence in the U.S. government during the McCarthy era, a disclosure the film entirely overlooks. In summary, Shafer wrote: "Clooney and company ignore the material that might argue against their simple-minded thesis about Murrow, the era, and the press to produce an after school special".

=== Accolades ===
The film received six Academy Award nominations, including Best Picture, Director (Clooney), and Actor (Strathairn). It was also nominated for six BAFTAs at the 2005 BAFTA Awards, and four Golden Globes at the 2006 Golden Globe Awards. The American Film Institute named Good Night, and Good Luck as one of the Top Ten Movies of 2005.

== Adaptations ==
=== Television series ===
As of November 2022, AMC is developing a television adaptation with Jonathan Glatzer as showrunner and Clooney as executive producer.

=== Broadway adaptation ===
In 2024, it was announced Clooney would make his Broadway debut starring in a stage adaptation based on the film. The play began previews at the Winter Garden Theatre on March 12, 2025, with an opening night set for April 3. It ran until June 8. The penultimate performance (June 7) was broadcast live on CNN on June 7 and released on Netflix worldwide in January 2026.

== See also ==
- 2005 in film
- George Clooney filmography
- History of CBS
- McCarthyism
- Tail Gunner Joe
- Television news in the United States
