= Grand station (CTA Red Line) =

Chicago "L" station

Grand 530N 0E/0W
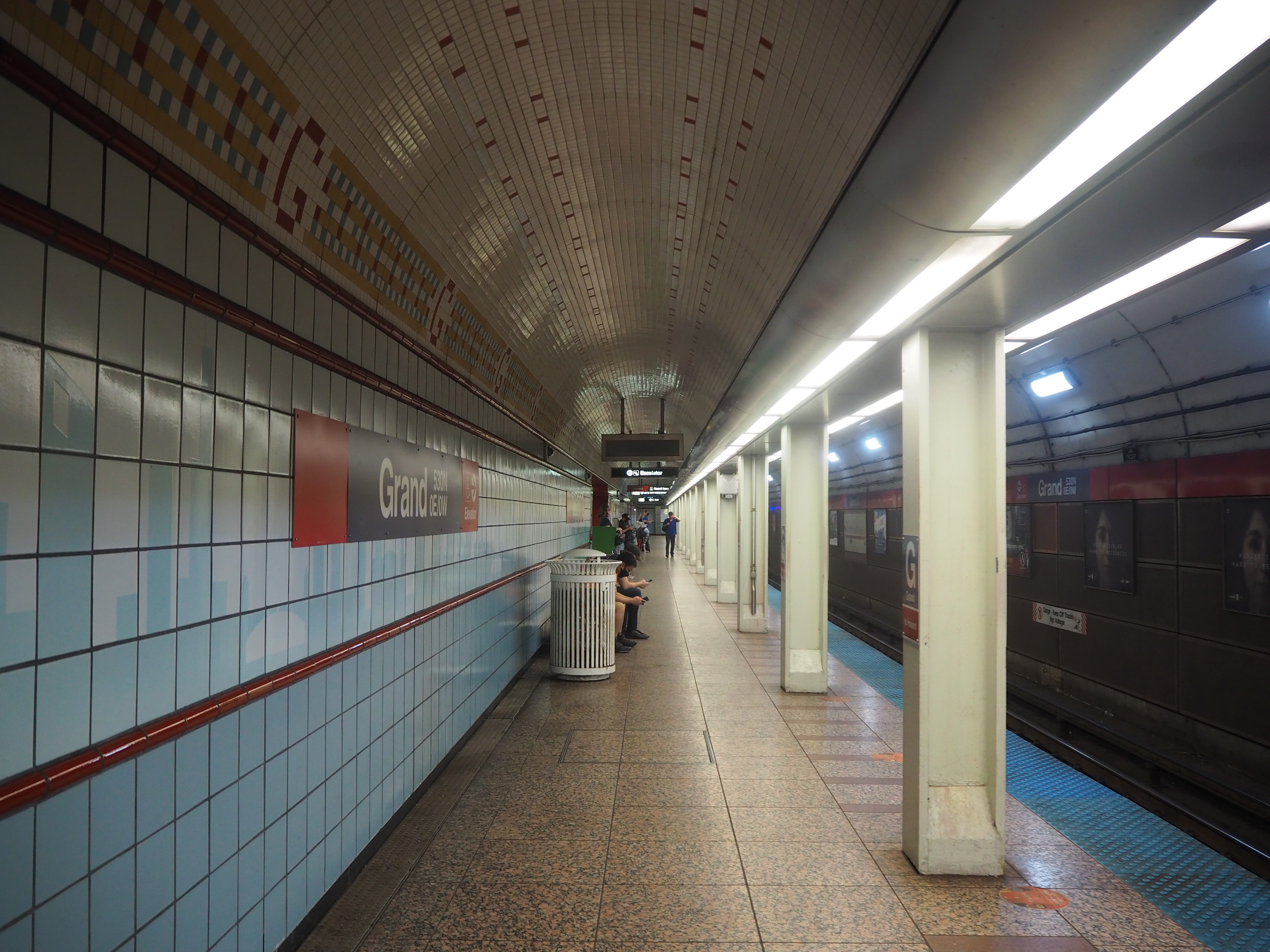

General information
- Location: 521 North State Street; Chicago, Illinois 60654
- Coordinates: 41.891665°N 87.628021°W
- Owner: City of Chicago
- Line: State Street subway
- Platforms: 2 side platforms
- Tracks: 2

Construction
- Structure type: Subway
- Depth: 33 feet (10 m)
- Accessible: Yes

History
- Opened: October 17, 1943; 82 years ago
- Rebuilt: 2007–12 (station renovation)

Passengers
- 2025: 2,287,080 ▲4.2%

Services
Preceding station	Chicago "L"	Following station
Chicago toward Howard	Red Line	Lake toward 95th/Dan Ryan
Track layout
Location

Grand (Grand/State in station announcements) is an "L" station on the CTA's Red Line. It serves Navy Pier, which is accessible via bus on Illinois Street one block south.

== Location ==
The first stop north of the Chicago River on the Red Line, Grand station is located in the River North neighborhood of the city. More specifically, it lies underneath North State Street at its intersection with Grand Avenue. Due to its central location, it serves a number of landmarks in Chicago, including Navy Pier and the Magnificent Mile to the east.

== History ==
Grand opened on October 17, 1943, as part of the State Street subway, which forms the central portion of what is now the Red Line between North/Clybourn and Roosevelt stations.

During the 1950s, the CTA implemented skip-stop service throughout the "L" system. Under this service pattern, Grand station was designated as AB along with all other downtown stations (on the Red Line, those stops south of Clark/Division and north of Cermak–Chinatown were given AB designations). As a result, all trains stopped at these stations. The skip-stop service was discontinued due to budget cuts in the 1990s.

=== Renovation ===
In line with other downtown stations, Grand station underwent renovation from 2007 until 2012. The project doubled the station's capacity through a 2,000 sq ft (190 m^{2}) mezzanine expansion as well as widening stairways and adding elevators. The final cost for the renovation was $73.6 million.

Unlike most State Street subway stations, Grand uses a side platform configuration with two tracks. This setup does exist, however, at Chicago/State and North/Clybourn stations. There are entrances from street level at all corners of the intersection of North State Street and Grand Avenue. One level below street level lies a mezzanine containing fare control, while the platforms are located beneath the mezzanine.

== Operations and connections ==
In the era immediately before the State Street subway opened, Grand Avenue had a streetcar service from either Harlem Avenue or Western Avenue (cars alternated between them) in the west to Navy Pier in the east. However, service was cut back from Navy Pier on September 28, 1941, and the tracks were removed on August 14, 1943. Buses began supplementing streetcar service to serve the Grand stations on the North Side Main Line and the State Street subway and relieve streetcar congestion, the service was extended to the entirety of the route on December 4, 1949; buses would replace streetcars altogether on April 1, 1951.

CTA

- 29 State
- 36 Broadway
- 65 Grand

Other

- Navy Pier Trolley (May–September Only)

== Works cited ==
- Lind, Alan R. (1974). Chicago Surface Lines: An Illustrated History. Park Forest, Illinois: Transport History Press.
