= Teddy Leifer =

British film producer

Teddy Leifer is a British film and television producer. He founded Rise Films in 2006, a London-based production company, and was nominated for an Academy Award in 2023.

He has produced a number of films and television programmes, including The Invisible War, Icarus, the Peabody Award-winning documentary All That Breathes, The Interrupters, Dreamcatcher, We Are Together, Rough Aunties, Mayor, The Art of Political Murder, George Carlin's American Dream and Plebs.

He is a member of the Academy of Motion Picture Arts and Sciences, BAFTA and the Producers Guild of America.

== Career ==
Leifer’s career began in 2006 with We Are Together, a documentary about the orphanage, Agape, in South Africa, which won the Special Jury Prize and Audience Award at Tribeca Film Festival.

He then produced Rough Aunties, his first collaboration with director Kim Longinotto, which won the Grand Jury Prize in the 'World Cinema — Documentary' category at the 2009 Sundance Film Festival. In 2013, as part of a publicly-voted list produced by the Hospital Club, The Guardian Culture Professionals Network listed Leifer in the "100 most innovative and influential people in British creative and media industries". He was nominated for Outstanding Producer of Documentary Theatrical Motion Pictures by the Producers Guild of America in 2023.

Other credits include The Invisible War (Oscar nominee, Emmy winner, Peabody winner) and The Interrupters (Emmy winner).

He later produced Longinotto’s Dreamcatcher in 2015, which went on to win Sundance’s World Cinema Directing Award.

Leifer was the executive producer of Academy Award-winning documentary Icarus in 2017, and Mayor in 2020, which won an Emmy. He also produced Dror Moreh’s The Human Factor, about the United States’ 30-year effort to bring peace to the Middle East.

In 2022, he produced All That Breathes, directed by Shaunak Sen - the first film to have won both the Grand Jury Prize at the Sundance Film Festival and Best Documentary at the Cannes Film Festival. The film subsequently received BAFTA and Oscar nominations for Best Documentary. At the 84th awards ceremony, All That Breathes won a Peabody Award for "its graceful portrait of empathy and interconnectivity between nature and man."

Other productions include George Carlin’s American Dream, a two-part documentary directed by Judd Apatow and Michael Bonfiglio which won the 2022 Emmy for Outstanding Documentary and Once Upon A Time In Londongrad, a political thriller about 14 mysterious UK deaths with alleged Russian links, described by The Guardian as “a blazing fireball that could topple our democracy”.

Leifer also produced Roman sitcom Plebs, which was the most-watched show in ITV2’s history. The series ended after five seasons with a feature-length special released in 2022.

Most recently, Leifer produced Teenage Wasteland which premiered at the 2025 Sundance Film Festival, The Balloonists which premiered at the 2025 Toronto International Film Festival, and Nuisance Bear which won the Grand Jury Prize at the 2026 Sundance Film Festival. This latest win makes Leifer the only person in Sundance history to have won the Grand Jury Prize three times (in either documentary or fiction).

== Filmography ==
- Nuisance Bear (2026) (producer)
- Mel Brooks: The 99 Year Old Man! (consulting producer)
- The Balloonists (2025) (producer)
- Teenage Wasteland (2025) (producer)
- Plebs: Soldiers of Rome (2023) (producer)
- All That Breathes (2022) (producer)
- George Carlin's American Dream (2022) (executive producer)
- Once Upon a Time In Londongrad (2022) (executive producer)
- The Art of Political Murder (2020) (producer)
- Mayor (2020) (executive producer)
- Plebs (TV Series) (2018) (producer)
- Icarus (2017) (executive producer)
- The Love Commandos (2016) (TV) (executive producer)
- Chancers (2016) (executive producer)
- Dreamcatcher (2015) (producer)
- Who is Dayani Cristal? (2013) (executive producer)
- The Invisible War (2012) (executive producer)
- Too Fast to be a Woman?: The Story of Caster Semenya (2011) (TV) (executive producer)
- The Interrupters (2011) (executive producer)
- Knuckle (2011) (producer)
- The Honeymoon Suite (2010) (short) (producer)
- Road To Las Vegas (2010) (TV) (producer)
- Cowboys in India (2009) (producer)
- Brave Young Men (2009) (TV) (producer)
- Muslim School (2009) (TV) (executive producer)
- Rough Aunties (2008) (producer)
- Project Kashmir (2008) (associate producer)
- We Are Together (Thina Simunye) (2006) (producer)
- The 10th Man (2006) (short) (producer)
- The Unsteady Chough (2004) (producer)
