= Section Eight Productions =

American film production company

- Type: Production company
- Industry: Entertainment
- Predecessor: Maysville Pictures
- Founded: December 1999; 26 years ago
- Founders: George Clooney; Steven Soderbergh
- Defunct: 2006; 20 years ago
- Fate: Defunct
- Successor: Smokehouse Pictures; Extension 765
- Key people: Jennifer Fox; Gregory Jacobs; Ben Cosgrove

Section Eight Productions, or just Section Eight, was an American film production company founded in December 1999 by film director Steven Soderbergh and actor/director George Clooney, following the success of the film Out of Sight.

Its name was taken from the discharge (a military recognition category for separation) of the character Maxwell Q. Klinger on one of George Clooney's favorite childhood TV shows, M*A*S*H.

== History ==
=== Predecessors ===
In February 1996, ER star George Clooney founded his first production company, a television company called Mirador Entertainment, which signed a deal with NBC Studios to develop television programming. Deborah Leoni joined in as partner in July of that year.

In November 1996, George Clooney founded another company to supplement the television-based Mirador, Left Bank Productions with partner Robert Lawrence, and the company signed a deal with Warner Bros. Pictures. In 1997, Left Bank Productions changed its name to Maysville Pictures (named after Clooney's hometown in Maysville, Kentucky) to avoid confusion with a music-based management firm with the Left Bank name.

In 1998, the Mirador deal was supplanted by a new television deal at Warner Bros. Television and CBS with the Maysville Pictures name, was headed by Clooney as well as Pam Williams and Ben Cosgrove. In 1999, Robert Lawrence and George Clooney broke their partnership, with Clooney continuing to run Maysville on its own. Only two works were released under the Maysville Pictures name, the television movie Fail Safe, and the 2001 film Rock Star.

When Section Eight was first formed, the company signed a deal with Warner Bros. Pictures, and took the exiting Maysville staff with them, including Ben Cosgrove, who was with Maysville before Section Eight was formed.

=== Section Eight ===
The company was founded in 1999 after George Clooney met Steven Soderberg and secured a deal at Warner Bros. Pictures. Although Section Eight remained in the old Maysville offices, Soderbergh worked from New York City.

It produced the critical hits Far from Heaven, Insomnia, Syriana, A Scanner Darkly and Michael Clayton, as well as Clooney-directed films Confessions of a Dangerous Mind and Good Night, and Good Luck. In 2005, Syriana and Good Night, and Good Luck picked up eight Oscars nominations between them.

In 2003, the company set up a television division, led by Grant Heslov. The company's two television productions is the show, K Street which aired on HBO in 2003, and Unscripted, which also aired on HBO in 2005.

With Soderbergh citing a desire to focus on directing through Extension 765, and Clooney forming production company Smokehouse Pictures with Grant Heslov (who worked at Section Eight for just five years) in the same building, but under a new name where Maysville and Section Eight were, the two decided to shut down Section Eight at the end of 2006.

== Films ==
Year	Film	Director	Notes
2001	Ocean's Eleven	Steven Soderbergh	Remake of Ocean's Eleven (1960)
2002	Insomnia	Christopher Nolan	Remake of Insomnia (1997)
2002	Welcome to Collinwood	Anthony Russo; Joe Russo	
2002	Confessions of a Dangerous Mind	George Clooney	
2002	Full Frontal	Steven Soderbergh	
2002	Far from Heaven	Todd Haynes	
2004	Criminal	Gregory Jacobs	Remake of Nine Queens (2000)
2004	Ocean's Twelve	Steven Soderbergh	
2005	The Jacket	John Maybury	
2005	Good Night, and Good Luck	George Clooney	
2005	Syriana	Stephen Gaghan	
2005	Rumor Has It...	Rob Reiner	
2006	A Scanner Darkly	Richard Linklater	
2006	The Good German	Steven Soderbergh	
2007	Wind Chill	Gregory Jacobs	
2007	Ocean's Thirteen	Steven Soderbergh	
2007	Michael Clayton	Tony Gilroy	
2009	The Informant!	Steven Soderbergh	

== Television ==
Title	First aired	Last aired	Co-production	Network	Notes
K Street	September 14, 2003	November 16, 2003	Interface Media Group; Sennet/Gernstein Entertainment	HBO	
Unscripted	January 9, 2005	February 27, 2005	Warner Bros. Television	HBO	
