= Carole Spiers =

Carole Spiers MBE FISMA, FPSA
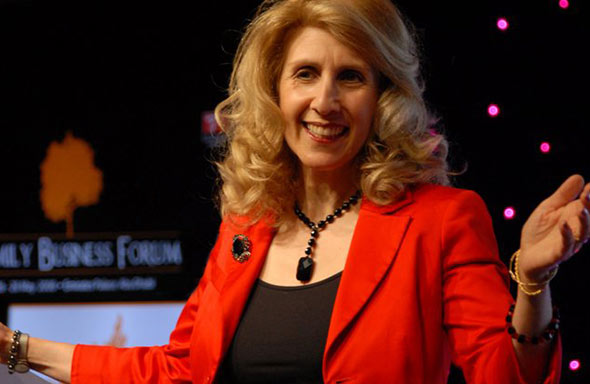
- Spiers presenting at Abu Dhabi Family Business Leaders Forum
- Born: June 1951 (age 75)
- Occupations: Entrepreneur; author; public speaker
- Employer: Carole Spiers Group
- Known for: Stress management expert
- Notable work: Tolley's Managing Stress in the Workplace; Show Stress Who's Boss!
- Website: Carole Spiers Group

Carole Anita Spiers MBE is a British entrepreneur, public speaker and author best known for her work in the field of stress management, counselling and employee wellbeing.

== Career ==
Spiers is the founder and CEO of the Carole Spiers Group, an international stress management employee counselling consultancy working mainly in the contrasting cultures of UK and the Middle East. She is a RELATE trained counsellor and post-trauma debriefer, and a former Expert Witness before the UK courts.

Spiers is Chair of The International Stress Management Association (UK), a registered charity and the lead professional body for workplace and personal Stress Management, Wellbeing and Performance. On their behalf, in 1999, she launched National Stress Awareness Day, which 20 years later, evolved into International Stress Awareness Week. She was also a member of the committee for the UK Government initiative 'Securing the Health of the Nation'.

Being an international motivational speaker Spiers delivers keynote addresses to conferences and seminars. From 2006 to 2008, she was the President of the London Chapter of the Professional Speaking Association, and is currently a Fellow of the Association.

In 2014, she was appointed Communications Partner for Mosaic, a charity founded by HRH Prince of Wales in 2007, who through its mentoring programmes, inspire young people from deprived communities, worldwide, to realise their talents and potential.

Spiers supports the UK Government Older Worker's Campaign whose remit is to provide help and support for older people who want to get back in, or stay in, work and employers who could benefit by employing older people.

She is chair and a Trustee of HGS U3A (Hampstead Garden Suburb University of the Third Age), a learning co-operative for people no longer in full-time work. Since taking up the role in 2022, she has launched several new interest groups and established an outreach programme to engage with the wider local community.

In 2022, Carole was appointed an Ambassador for the Age Irrelevance campaign, which challenges stereotypes around ageing and promotes active, purposeful living at any age.

Spiers was appointed Member of the Order of the British Empire (MBE) by the King in the 2025 Birthday Honours list for her contribution to stress management and mental health.

== Media work ==
Being the author of Tolley's Managing Stress in the Workplace [2022] and Show Stress Who's Boss! [2011], which has been translated into Arabic and available in the United Arab Emirates and India. Spiers' clients include AstraZeneca, Costco, Commercial Bank of Dubai, Debenhams, Dubai Cables, Emirates, Gasco (Abu Dhabi), Givaudan, House of Fraser, Indesit, Ooredoo (Qatar) and Mubadala.

For 8 years, Spiers was a weekly business columnist for Gulf News, writing on stress-related issues facing Middle East management, and a past columnist for Khaleej Times. Her work has appeared in publications including HR Review, Stressbusting, and has been a guest broadcaster of programs discussing issues related to workplace stress and bullying on LBC, BBC, Studio One-Dubai, CNN and BBC Radio. Spiers has also been interviewed or quoted in media including BBC and The Guardian.

== Humanitarian work ==
During the Yugoslavian Civil War, on behalf of the voluntary organisation Befrienders Worldwide, Spiers repeatedly visited Novi Sad to train humanitarian aid-workers in crisis intervention and post-traumatic stress, as well as counselling many refugees. She served as a Samaritan telephone crisis volunteer from 1979 – 2009 and visited prisoners in Wormwood Scrubs prison supporting their Listener scheme, a peer support service which aims to reduce suicide and self-harm in prisons. Since 2003, she has been working as a partner of the Dreamcatcher Foundation – South Africa working on the townships of South Africa's Southern Cape delivering micro-business training programmes and one to one coaching sessions to local entrepreneurs living in township communities by providing marketing expertise for those wishing to develop their own businesses in their local communities.

Her most recent trip to South Africa in 2025, where she delivered training sessions to teachers, students, and corporate employees on how to reduce stress and improve health and wellbeing.

== Selected bibliography ==
- Spiers, Carole (2003). Tolley's Managing Stress in the Workplace. London: LexisNexis. pp. 448 pages. ISBN 978-0754512691.
- Spiers, Carole (2005). Positive Action Against Stress: Meeting the Everyday Challenge. London: Equilibrium Publications. ISBN 978-0955038013.
- Spiers, Carole (2007). Turn Your Passion into Profit: Unlocking Your Hidden Potential for a First Class Ticket for Life. London: Equilibrium Publications. pp. 84 pages. ISBN 978-0955038020.
- Spiers, Carole (2011). Show Stress Who's Boss!. London: Filament Publishing. pp. 261 pages. ISBN 978-0955038037.
- Spiers, Carole (2014). Wave Goodbye to Stress! How to Beat it in 4 Easy Steps!. London: Filament Publishing. pp. 185 pages. ASIN B00KB5D1M8.
