= Chicago station (CTA Red Line) =

Chicago "L" station

Chicago 800N 0E/0W
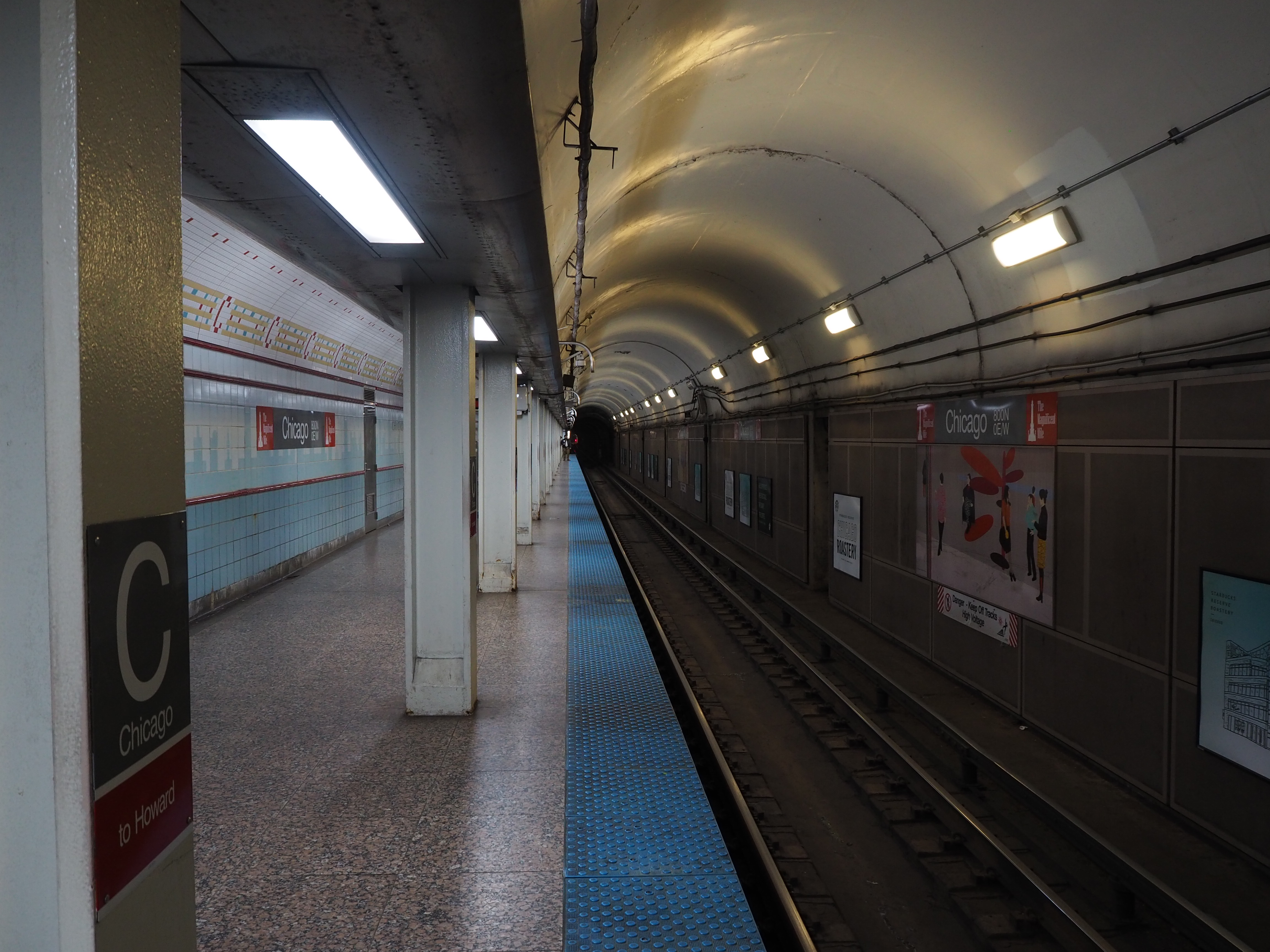
- View of the Howard-bound platform and track.

General information
- Location: 800 North State Street; Chicago, Illinois 60654
- Coordinates: 41.896679°N 87.6282°W
- Owner: City of Chicago
- Line: State Street subway
- Platforms: 2 side platforms
- Tracks: 2

Construction
- Structure type: Subway
- Depth: 43 ft (13 m)
- Accessible: Yes

History
- Opened: October 17, 1943; 82 years ago
- Rebuilt: 1999–2001 (station renovation)

Passengers
- 2025: 2,608,031 ▲3.9%

Services
Preceding station	Chicago "L"	Following station
Clark/Division toward Howard	Red Line	Grand toward 95th/Dan Ryan
Track layout
Location

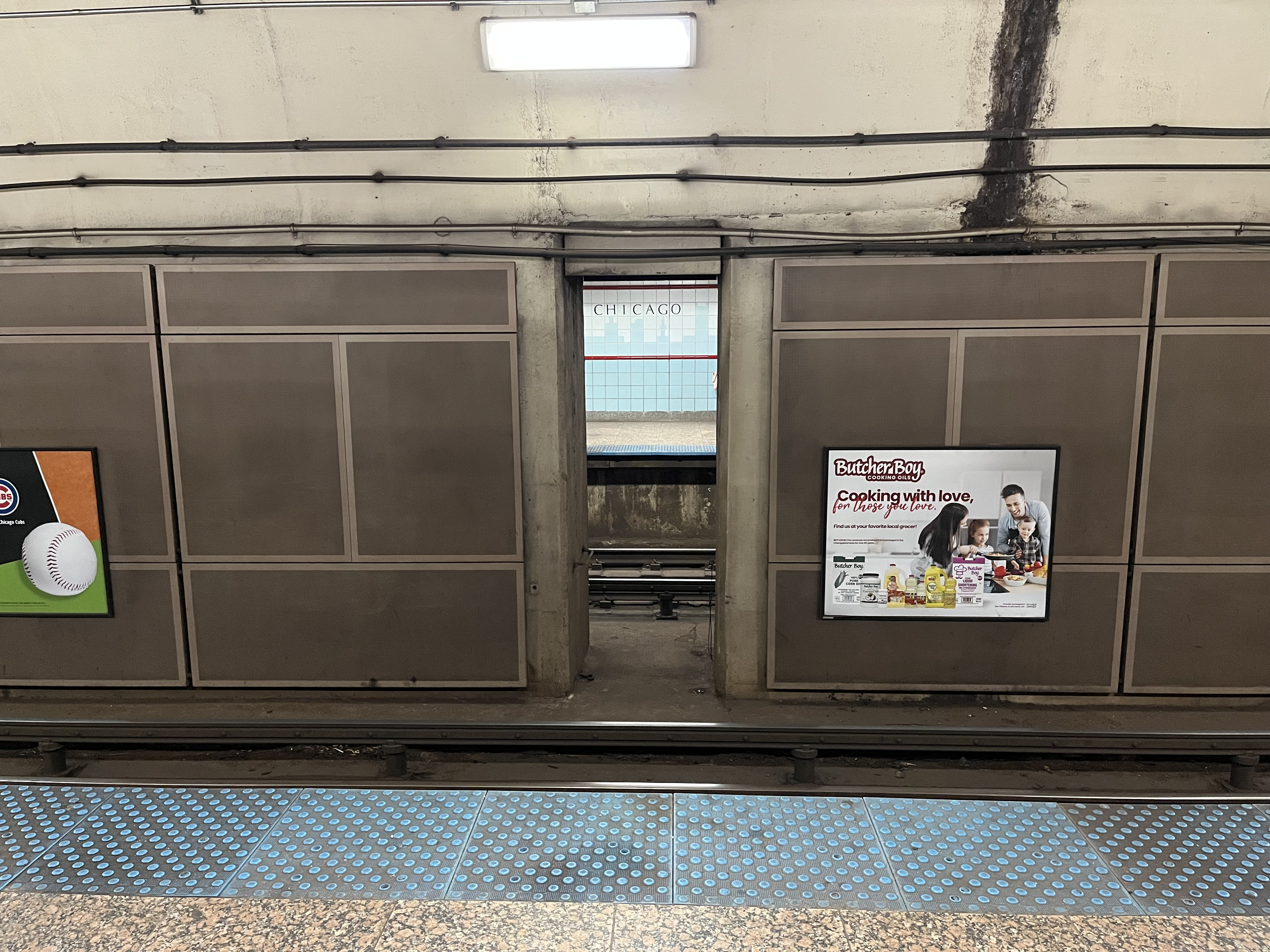
View across the tracks in 2023

Chicago (Chicago/State in station announcements) is an "L" station on the CTA's Red Line. It serves a significant portion of the Near North Side and Streeterville neighborhoods. With over 5.25 million overall boardings in 2014, it is the busiest station on the Red Line north of the Loop.

== Location ==
The second stop on the Red Line north of the Chicago River, Chicago station lies in the central portion of the Near North Side. Specifically, it is located underneath the intersection of State Street and Chicago Avenue. It is three blocks west of the northern section of the Magnificent Mile; the Chicago Water Tower is located on that strip at the intersection of Chicago and Michigan Avenues. It is also the closest 'L' station to the John Hancock Center, Holy Name Cathedral, the Rush Street entertainment district, and the downtown campus of Loyola University Chicago. The Chicago campus of the Moody Bible Institute is also nearby.

== History ==
The Chicago station opened on October 17, 1943, as part of the State Street subway, which forms the central portion of what is now the Red Line between North/Clybourn and Roosevelt stations.

During the 1950s, the CTA implemented skip-stop service throughout the 'L' system. Under this service pattern, Chicago was designated as AB along with all other downtown stations (on the Howard-Englewood-Jackson Park Line, those stops south of Clark/Division and north of Tech–35th were given AB designations). As a result, all trains stopped at these stations. Skip-stop service ended due to a decline in ridership in the 1990s.

=== Renovation ===
From 1999 until 2001, Chicago underwent renovation and refurbishment, in line with other stations of the State Street subway. Work included making the station accessible to people with disabilities, with new elevators, redone flooring, retiling, and increased mezzanine space.

Unlike most State Street Subway stations, Chicago uses a side platform configuration with two tracks, also used at Grand/State and North/Clybourn. There are entrances from street level at all corners of the intersection of North State Street and Chicago Avenue. One level below street level is a mezzanine containing fare controls and turnstiles, and the platforms are located beneath the mezzanine.

== Bus connections ==
CTA

- 36 Broadway
- 66 Chicago (Owl Service)

== See also ==
- Chicago/Milwaukee on the Blue Line
- Chicago/Franklin on the Brown Line & Purple Line
