= K Street (TV series) =

- Genre: Comedy drama
- Created by: Steven Soderbergh
- Written by: Henry Bean
- Directed by: Steven Soderbergh
- Starring: James Carville; Mary Matalin; John Slattery; Mary McCormack; Roger Guenveur Smith
- Country of origin: United States
- Original language: English
- No. of seasons: 1
- No. of episodes: 10

Production
- Executive producers: Henry Bean; George Clooney; Mark Sennet; Steven Soderbergh; Grant Heslov
- Producers: Jonathan Zurer; Mike Fountain
- Production location: Washington D.C.
- Cinematography: Steven Soderbergh
- Editors: Steven Soderbergh; Tony Black
- Camera setup: Single-camera setup
- Running time: 30 minutes
- Production companies: Interface Media Group; Section Eight Productions; Sennet/Gernstein Entertainment

Original release
- Network: HBO
- Release: September 14 – November 16, 2003

K Street is a 2003 American television series about lobbyists and politicians in Washington, D.C. It was named for a street that is home to many lobbying and legal firms. The series aired on HBO from September 14 to November 16, 2003, and was produced by Section Eight Productions.

== Format ==
Each episode was largely improvised, usually focusing on the major political news of the week.

K Street featured a fictional, bipartisan consulting firm led by husband and wife duo James Carville and Mary Matalin as themselves, as well as three fictional characters. The show featured cameos by numerous real-life political figures.

== Reception ==
For The New York Times, Alessandra Stanley wrote, "Much has been written about the growing resemblance between Hollywood and Washington. As seen from K Street, Foggy Bottom is just another La Brea Tar Pit, where dinosaurs from past campaigns continually surface to be restored and preserved". For the Washington Post, Tom Shales wrote, "K Street is highly unlikely to become a national sensation, but in big cities of the East it ought to be quite the conversation piece—for a little while anyway. In a sense, the show comes off like a marvelous party, but one to which many of us are bound to feel profoundly uninvited". Variety magazine's Phil Gallo wrote, "Director Steven Soderbergh uses a guerilla style of filmmaking to capture behind-the-scenes players with a fervent urgency; if K Street holds its course, it could serve as a primer in understanding modern-day politics". For the New York Daily News, David Bianculli wrote, "Its starkness—no music, no opening credits and no identification of the show's real and imagined players until the end—is a stylistic choice, but an unsatisfying one". For the New York Post, Adam Buckman wrote, "I didn't quite believe my eyes when I watched K Street, but like a UFO, I'm eager for a second look". USA Today gave the show one-and-a-half stars out of four and wrote, "sitting through K Street was like watching a group of show-off kids hanging around amusing each other when they should be working. You'd think these people would have better things to do with their time, particularly the ones who are drawing a salary from the public treasury. Taxpayers and HBO subscribers should demand better for their money".
