= Waiting for Woody =

- Directed by: Grant Heslov
- Screenplay by: Grant Heslov
- Produced by: Robert Bauer
- Starring: Grant Heslov
- Edited by: David Klandrud
- Music by: Jay Gruska
- Release date: 1998
- Running time: 30 minutes
- Country: United States
- Language: English

Waiting for Woody is a 1998 drama featurette directed by and starring Grant Heslov. The film depicts a fictional audition for Woody Allen. The cast includes Heslov himself in the main role, George Clooney and Jennifer Aniston. The film is based on a true audition Heslov had passed for Allen.

== Premise ==
The actor Josh Silver has great expectations before being auditioned for a film by Woody Allen.

== Cast ==
- Grant Heslov as Josh Silver
- Samantha Mathis as Gail Silver
- Tate Donovan as David
- Richard Kind as Doorman
- Thom Mathews as Bike Messenger
- George Clooney as himself
- Jennifer Aniston as herself
- Ed Crasnick as Woody Allen
- Carol Ann Susi
- Pamela Adlon

== Accolades ==
Year	Award	Category	Recipient	Result	Reference
2007	Art Film Festival	Jury Award	Grant Heslov	Won	
2007	Florida Film Festival	Grand Jury Award for Best Short	Grant Heslov	Won	
2007	Molodist	Best Short Fiction Film	Grant Heslov	Nominated	
2007	New York International Independent Film and Video Festival	Best Short Comedy	Grant Heslov	Won	

== Release ==
The film premiered at the Newport Beach International Film Festival in 1998.

== Production ==
Heslov had a "documentary-style idea" in mind before starting the film.

The actual Heslov's audition for Woody Allen lasted "about one minute", he reported, and he didn't get the part. In an interview for the Los Angeles Times, Heslov told Mary McNamara: "The audition went a certain way, and when I told people about it, they said I should make a movie."

== Reception ==
The film was described as "reasonably clever" and "constructed in the tone of an Allen feature" with the actors "giving amusing renditions of themselves". It was screened at 30 film festivals.

According to Rachel Abramovitz in the Los Angeles Times, the featurette is "a kind of actor’s anxiety dream about auditioning for Woody Allen, inspired by his own experience. It caught the attention of agents, but Heslov admits he wasn’t sure about how to proceed with his career." Mary McNamara reported the short was "well received".

The character of the impotent actor played by Heslov presents "neuroses that rival those of the Oscar-wiinning filmmaker", allowing the short to take "unexpected turns".
