= Brenda Myers-Powell =

American activist and human trafficking advocate

- Born: Brenda Jean Myers; April 18, 1957 (age 69); Chicago, Illinois, U.S.
- Occupations: Activist; Human trafficking advocate
- Years active: 2006–present
- Spouse: Keith Powell (m. 2004)
- Children: 3

Brenda Jean Myers-Powell (born April 18, 1957) is an American activist and advocate against human trafficking. Myers-Powell, a human trafficking survivor is the co-founder of The Dreamcatcher Foundation, a nonprofit which aims to fight human trafficking in the Chicago area.

== Biography ==
Myers-Powell was born to a teenage mother and grew up on the west side of Chicago. Her mother died when she was six months old. Myers-Powell was subsequently raised by her alcoholic grandmother. Friends of her grandmother started sexually abusing her when she was four or five years old. Myers-Powell was abducted and forced into prostitution at age 14. By that time she had already given birth to two daughters. Her grandmother told her that she should bring money in. At that time there was no food in the house. Myers-Powell said that she had seen prostitutes working on the street and getting paid for what had already been done to her. Needing enough money to survive, she decided to work on the street. Myers-Powell subsequently became a prostitute for 25 years. The third time Myers-Powell went to the corner to work, in June 1973, two pimps attacked her, abducted her from outside the Mark Twain Hotel on the Near North Side, raped her, and locked her into a hotel room until she agreed to work for them from there on. She tried to escape several times but wasn't able to do so for six months. Later on she was prostituted out by other pimps. She also helped her pimps procure other young girls for the life. After about 14 or 15 years of sex work, she became addicted to drugs. Myers Powell was shot at five times and stabbed 13 times by clients during her time as a prostitute.

Myers-Powell left the life as a prostitute after a client almost killed her. After sustaining severe injuries from the client she was treated at County Hospital in Chicago where a doctor advised her to visit the social services at the hospital and she was given the address of Genesis House. Myers-Powell found refuge at Genesis House, which is a safe house for women that are prostituted in the Chicago area. She received job training there and counseling. Myers-Powell credits the head of the safe house, Edwina Gateley, with saving her and teaching her on how to be confident.

=== Activism ===
Myers-Powell co-founded The Dreamcatcher Foundation (TDF) together with social worker Stephanie Daniels-Wilson in 2008. The organisation works to fight human trafficking in the Chicago area. TDF prevents trafficking by helping at-risk youth through education and empowerment programs. Kim Longinotto released a documentary, Dreamcatcher, showcasing its work in 2015.

Myers-Powell also is a public speaker on the topic of human trafficking. She testified in front of the Illinois State Senate. She works with Chicago Alliance Against Sexual Exploitation in order to have the criminal records of former prostitutes be expunged. She also wants the criminal responsibility to be put on the pimps and johns instead of the prostitutes. She also collaborates with university researchers like Jody Raphael with their field work in the topic of prostitution.

=== Personal life ===
Myers-Powell has been married once and has four children, one adopted. Myers-Powell has been married to Keith Powell since 2004. She has three daughters and a son.
