= 1800 N. Clybourn =

Coordinates: 41°54′49.5″N 87°39′13.5″W

Clybourn Square (1800 N. Clybourn)
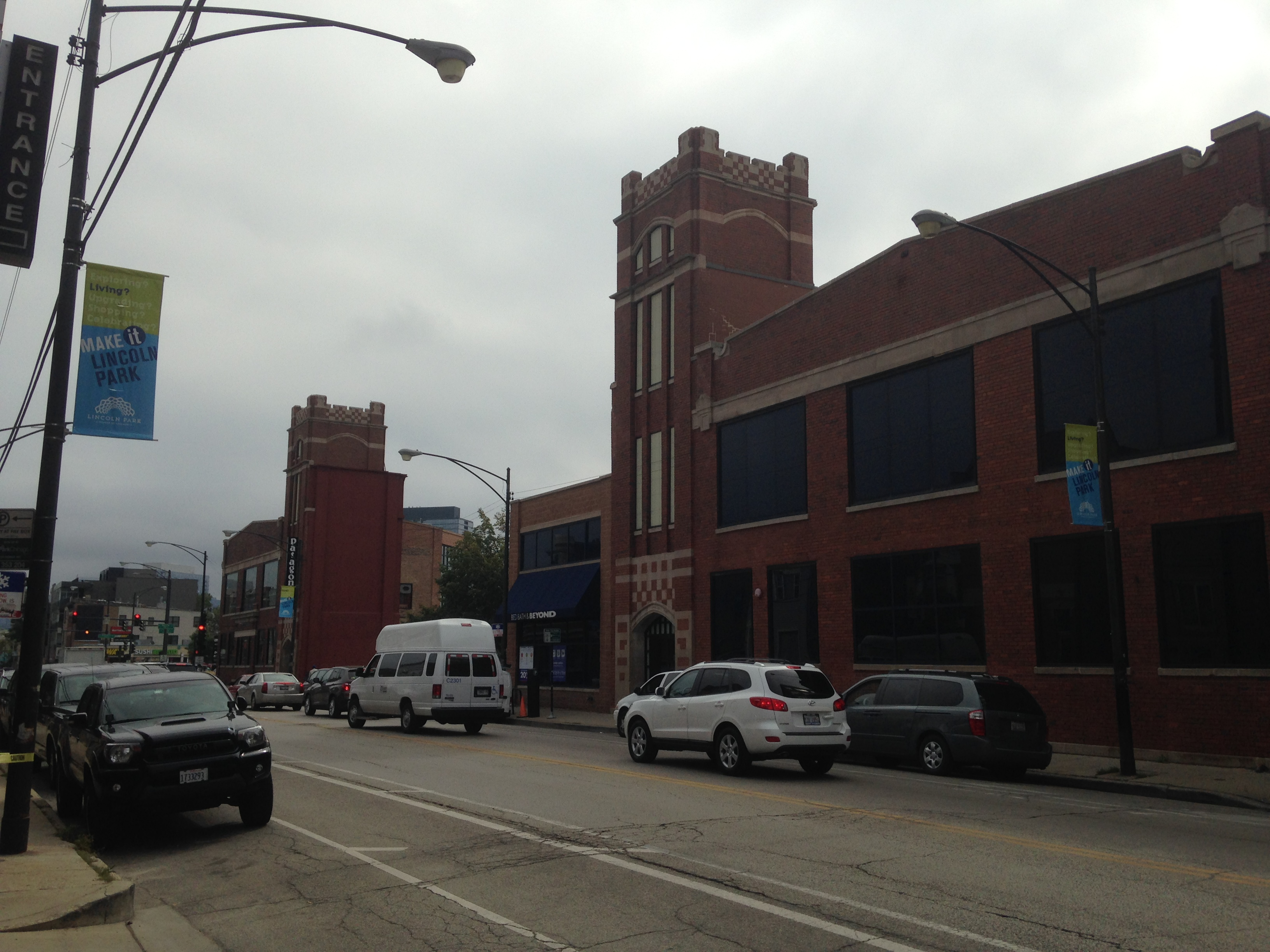
- 1800 N. Clybourn in 2016
- Location: Chicago, Illinois, United States
- Address: 1800 N. Clybourn Ave., Chicago, IL 60614
- Opened: 1989
- Closed: 1993
- Developer: Horwitz Matthews
- Owner: CRM Properties Group Ltd.
- Num. of stores: 6
- Num. of anchor tenants: 1
- Floor area: 75,000 sq ft (6,968 m^{2})
- Floors: 3
- Parking: Surface

1800 N. Clybourn was a shopping center located at 1800 N. Clybourn Ave. in the Clybourn Corridor area of Lincoln Park, Chicago.

The building was once the William D. Gibson spring factory, and later a plant for making Turtle Wax. It was converted to a three-level enclosed specialty shopping center that retained the structure's wood beams and brickwork. At its opening, developer Tem Horwitz described it as "an industrial environment with the atmosphere of a traveling fair come to town." News reports pointed out the interior's exuberant architecture and unconventional merchandising plan, and that only half its 40 spaces were leased at its opening.

Among the tenants in 1990 included "pricey apparel and accessories stores, gift shops, and such services as a travel agency, a nail salon and a family aerobics club," plus restaurants and entertainment venues like "Goose Island Brewery; Metropolis 1800; Par Excellence, an artist-designed miniature golf course; Muddler's Pool Room; and its adjoining espresso bar, Caffe Lupi." Entertainment was a major focus; the mall opened with Willow Street Carnival, a 450-seat cabaret-style theater founded by Bernard Sahlins, and had proposed a 10-screen cinema on site.

What Horwitz called a "wild and crazy and fun" mall did not last long amidst a recession, and the building was foreclosed upon in April 1993 amidst numerous store closures. The building was soon purchased by CRM Properties, which demolished the richly decorated enclosed courts and left three buildings separated by parking lots.

As of 2015, one large L-shaped building houses anchor Bed Bath & Beyond, the now-closed original location of Goose Island Brewery, plus a furniture retailer and real estate offices on upper floors. Two smaller buildings house Patagonia and GapKids. The building's pair of crenellated, four-story towers still face Clybourn, but much of the structure between them was demolished.
