= Ben Bernhard =

German cinematographer

Ben Bernhard is a German cinematographer born and raised in Konstanz, university city of South Germany. He received his BFA and MFA in Cinematography from the German Film and Television Academy in Berlin (DFFB). Since then, he has directed various feature films and documentaries. In 2014 he received a fellowship from the California Institute of the Arts in Los Angeles.

Since 2009, Ben has worked with Viktor Kossakovsky and collaborated with Annika Pinske, and the Peabody Award-winning film All That Breathes directed by Shaunak Sen. He was awarded by the American Society of Cinematographers, Doc NYC, and Cinema Eye Honors for Best Cinematography (with Riju Das and Saumyananda Sahi).
