= Smokehouse Pictures =

American film production company

- Type: Private
- Industry: Motion pictures and television
- Predecessor: Section Eight Productions
- Founded: 2006; 20 years ago
- Founders: George Clooney; Grant Heslov
- Headquarters: Burbank, California, United States
- Products: Film production
- Website: smokehouse-pictures.com

Smokehouse Pictures is an American film and television production company. The company was founded in 2006 by George Clooney and Grant Heslov after the shutdown of Section Eight Productions. Its name is taken from the Smoke House restaurant, located across the street from Warner Bros. Studios in Burbank, California where Clooney filmed the television show ER.

== History ==
One of the company's co-founders, Grant Heslov was previously an executive of Section Eight Productions, the previous name of George Clooney's production company, where he worked for five years.

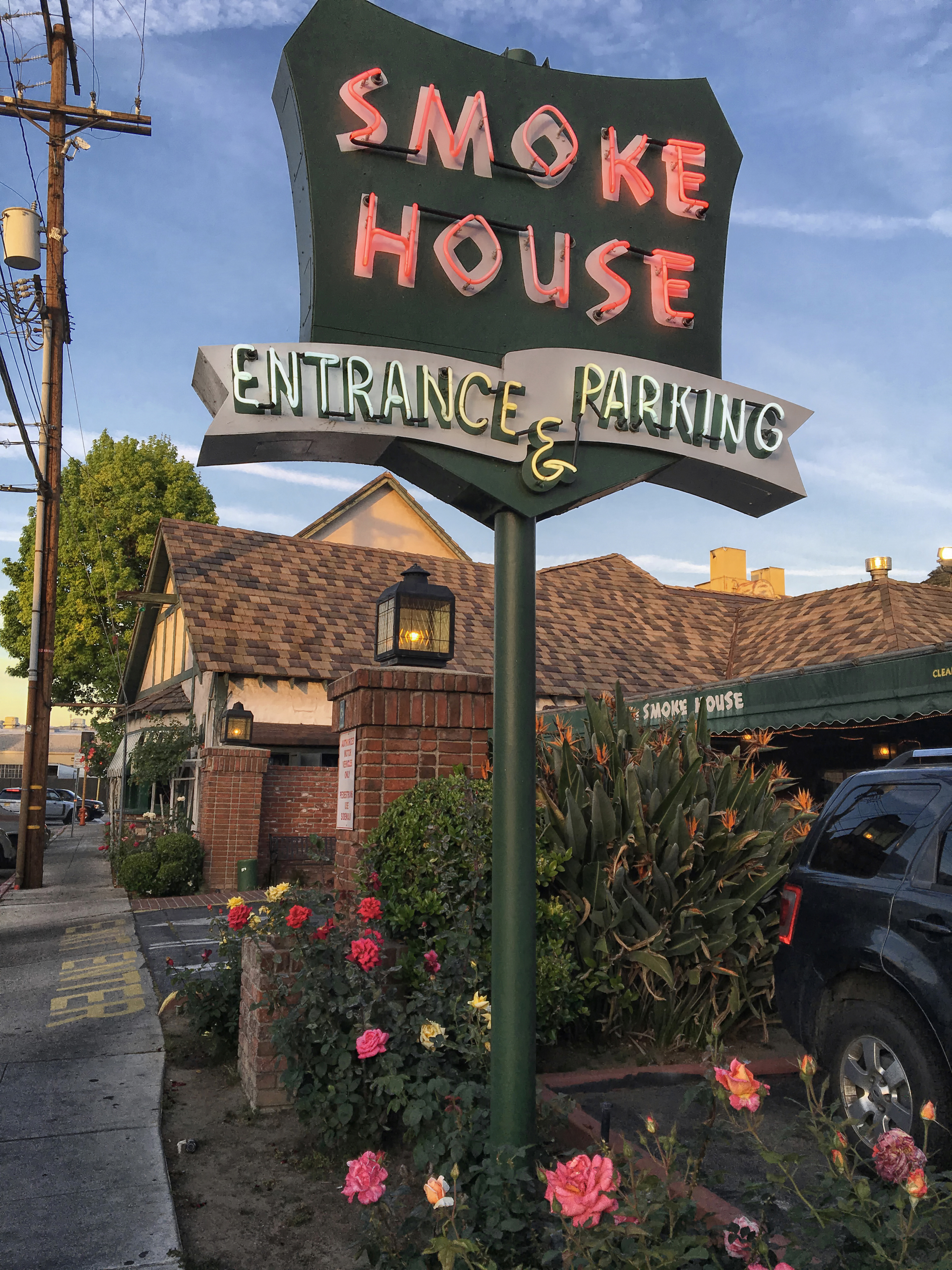
Smoke House Restaurant

The company signed a long-term production and development agreement with Warner Bros. Pictures and Warner Bros. Television in July 2006. The company continues to have an office on the same lot where Clooney's previous names of its production companies Maysville Pictures and Section Eight had.

In June 2009, the company signed an exclusive two-year theatrical development and production deal with Sony Pictures Entertainment. In 2014, the company signed a first-look television deal with Sony Pictures Television to develop television shows.

In 2018, the company signed a deal with Paramount Television, and in 2019, signed a deal with MGM. In March 2023, the company returned to Warner Bros. for an overall film deal.

== Films ==
Year	Film	Director	Notes
2008	Leatherheads	George Clooney	
2009	Playground	Libby Spears	
2009	The Men Who Stare at Goats	Grant Heslov	
2010	The American	Anton Corbijn	
2011	The Ides of March	George Clooney	
2012	Argo	Ben Affleck	Best Picture: Academy Award, AFI, Golden Globe, BAFTA; Best Director: Golden Globe, BAFTA
2013	August: Osage County	John Wells	
2014	The Monuments Men	George Clooney	
2015	Our Brand Is Crisis	David Gordon Green	
2016	Money Monster	Jodie Foster	
2017	Suburbicon	George Clooney	
2018	Ocean's 8	Gary Ross	
2018	O.G.	Madeleine Sackler	
2020	The Art of Political Murder	Paul Taylor	
2020	The Midnight Sky	George Clooney	
2021	The Tender Bar	George Clooney	
2022	Ticket to Paradise	Ol Parker	
2023	The Boys in the Boat	George Clooney	
2024	Wolfs	Jon Watts	
2025	Surviving Ohio State	Eva Orner	
2026	Furies	Rami Kodeih	

== Television ==
Title	First aired	Last aired	Co-production	Network	Notes
Memphis Beat	June 22, 2010	August 16, 2011	Warner Horizon Television	TNT	
Catch-22	May 17, 2019	May 17, 2019	Anonymous Content; Paramount Television	Hulu	
On Becoming a God in Central Florida	August 25, 2019	October 20, 2019	Pali Eyes Pictures; TriStar Television	Showtime	
