= The Dreamcatcher Foundation =

Non-profit anti-sex-trafficking organization

- Formation: 2008-present
- Founders: Stephanie Daniels-Wilson, Brenda Myers-Powell
- Headquarters: 5401 S Hyde Park Blvd, Chicago, IL 60615
- Website: thedreamcatcherfoundation.org

The Dreamcatcher Foundation is a Chicago-based non-profit organization that helps women who want to stop working in the sex industry, especially female prostitutes. They offer services to help the women reintegrate into society. The non-profit organization is working towards creating a facility of their own where the women will be able to stay while getting help. They have saved 87 women since their foundation.

== History and background ==
In 2008, Brenda Myers Powell and Stephanie Daniels-Wilson founded The Dreamcatcher Foundation. The organization was established to help combat the issue of sex exploration and for those seeking to escape the sex industry. Both Myers-Powell and Daniels-Wilson have personal experience with sex work. In an interview with MSNBC, Myers-Powell shared her experiences in the sex industry, which led her and Daniels-Wilson to found The Dreamcatcher Foundation.

The Dreamcatcher Foundation's primary goal is to help women trying to get out of sex trafficking and/or sex exploitation. These are women who were placed into this lifestyle by someone or on their own. The foundation helps as many victims get out of dangerous and desperate situations, especially those in which they cannot get out of themselves. They offer support to the victims through different resources and services. The foundation also works to help prevent at-risk youths from becoming sex workers by giving talks at high schools, and attending events to spread awareness.

To help a victim, the foundation uses a harm reduction approach, which involves going to the working site where prostitutes work. The workers are approached at night by one of the founders, Myers-Powell, with the pretext of asking them if they need condoms. After some talk by Myers-Powell, she gives them the choice to go with the foundation and get help, or decline. If the woman agrees, the foundation looks for outside resources to help each girls' specific needs. From drug abuse rehabs to educational classes, the foundation finds the appropriate services to help the victim recover and succeed. Though the foundation has no center, they have saved 87 women from prostitution since the foundation of the organization. They have also contacted about 2,500 trafficked and exploited women in Chicago by giving away clothes, condoms and their business cards.

On March 25, 2014, The Dreamcatcher Foundation formed a partnership with JUF Government Affairs, Congregation Hakafa, Congregation Judea Mitzpah Chicago Alliance Against Sexual Exploitation (CAASE), and other organizations in a project called "The Coalition" to fight against sex trafficking by spreading awareness to the public and education for the survivors.

On September 13, 2015, Brenda Myers-Powell gave a speech named "Dreamcatcher - A Story of Personal Strength and Human Trafficking Victims" at the Ethical Humanist Society of Chicago organization. The speech focused on sexual exploitation and human trafficking in which gave exposure to the Dreamcatcher Foundation organization and its goal to the community.

Other events include Myers-Powell's speech on behalf of the foundation at a convention that helped lead to the creation for the House Bill 2822, which provides state help to trafficked victims. Also, the foundation has become a resource for state courts and affordable care act.

== Programs ==
=== Harm reduction approach ===
The Dreamcatcher Foundation utilizes a harm reduction approach, in which they attempt to reach the sex workers in the streets as they work. The women receive full autonomy in the choices and decisions that are made to help them rehabilitate themselves. Using this approach will allow the survivor to have the freedom to decide what they want to do.

=== Youth empowerment project ===
The Dreamcatcher Foundation has a holistic approach to assisting women and girls in the transition from prostitution and being owned by pimps to normal civilian life, but also prostitution prevention. The Youth Empowerment Project gives women preventive approaches to avoid sexual exploitation, through education. They receive classes on self-defense, assertiveness training, and high school education.

=== My Life, My Choice ===
The My Life, My Choice program helps women who took part in sex trade. It is a 12-week program that focuses on healing and recovery services. They give the women mentors, and help them learn how to build and maintain meaningful relationships. They also provide free HIV and STI testing, as well as general check ups and drug prevention education.

=== Residential Center ===
Due to a lack of onsite housing for the recovering prostitutes, the Dreamcatcher Foundation must place the girls they are helping in homes and shelters across Chicago. The Foundation continues to raise money to have their own residential complex and shelter, so that the girls they rescue from being human trafficked can have their own beds and spaces.

== Media ==
The Dreamcatcher Foundation has been depicted on the media as a positive addition to Chicago's communities. Since it provides awareness of the sex industry in Chicago, most of the local newspapers and news broadcastings have featured the organization in their news. Some of the major points that the media has picked up on is that the organization creates discussions of the reality of sex workers towards the goal of combating the issue that is sex-trafficking and the sex industry. It aims to unravel the negative stigmas and stereotypes associated with sex workers by giving former sex workers a platform and voice to share their testimonies. As they aid in the reintegration of women into everyday society after traumatic life circumstances, they have been a fundamental part in the processes of passing laws to help sex-trade survivors. The Dreamcatcher Foundation hopes that with their outreach to the community and their appearances on news outlets, they will get enough donations to build their own center where they can be better equipped to help the victims.

In 2015, director Kim Longinotto released Dreamcatcher, a documentary which revolves around Brenda Myers-Powell, the Dreamcatcher Foundation organization's founder. The documentary captures the founder's story in the sex industry and her activities with the organization. It won a directing award for best World Cinema Documentary by Sundance Films.
