= Rough Aunties =

2008 British documentary film

- Directed by: Kim Longinotto
- Produced by: Teddy Leifer, Paul Taylor
- Release date: 23 November 2008 (IDFA Festival)
- Running time: 103 minutes
- Countries: United Kingdom; South Africa
- Languages: English; Zulu

Rough Aunties is a 2008 documentary film directed by Kim Longinotto about a group of 5 women of Operation Bobbi Bear who protect and care for abused, neglected and forgotten children in Durban, South Africa. It was produced by Teddy Leifer and Paul Taylor.

It won the Grand Jury Prize in the 'World Cinema — Documentary' category at the 2009 Sundance Film Festival.

Awards
Preceded by Man on Wire	Sundance Grand Jury Prize: World Cinema Documentary; 2009	Succeeded by The Red Chapel
