= All That Breathes =

2022 documentary by Shaunak Sen

- Release poster
- Directed by: Shaunak Sen
- Produced by: Shaunak Sen; Aman Mann; Teddy Leifer
- Cinematography: Ben Bernhard; Riju Das; Saumyananda Sahi
- Edited by: Charlotte Munch Bengtsen
- Music by: Roger Goula
- Production companies: HBO Documentary Films; HHMI Tangled Bank Studios; Rise Films; Kiterabbit Films
- Distributed by: Janus Films; Sideshow; Submarine Deluxe (United States)
- Release dates: 22 January 2022 (Sundance); 21 October 2022 (Theatres)
- Running time: 91 minutes
- Countries: India; United Kingdom; United States
- Language: Hindi
- Box office: US$111,158

All That Breathes is a 2022 documentary film directed by Shaunak Sen. It is produced by Shaunak Sen, Aman Mann and Teddy Leifer under the banner of Rise Films. The film follows siblings Mohammad Saud and Nadeem Shehzad, who rescue and treat injured birds in India.

The film had its world premiere at the 2022 Sundance Film Festival on 22 January 2022, where it won Grand Jury Prize in World Cinema Documentary Competition. It also had a screening at Cannes Film Festival in the special screening section, where it won the Golden Eye. It was later nominated for the Academy Award for Best Documentary Feature Film. The film then went on to win a Peabody Award at the 84th ceremony for "its graceful portrait of empathy and interconnectivity between nature and man."

== Synopsis ==
Two brothers Saud and Nadeem were raised in New Delhi, looking at a sky speckled with black kites, watching as relatives tossed meat up to these birds of prey. Muslim belief held that feeding the kites would expel troubles. Now, birds are falling from the polluted, opaque skies of New Delhi and the two brothers have made it their life's work to care for the injured black kites.

Rather than focusing solely on their environmental work, the narrative weaves the brothers' personal story with broader socio-political and ecological themes. The film explores existential questions regarding the interdependence of living species alongside the increasingly tenuous position of the Muslim minority in contemporary India.

== Production ==
The documentary is the story of Nadeem Shehzad and Mohammad Saud, the two brothers who run a bird clinic in Wazirabad, Delhi where 20,000 raptors have been cured over the last 20 years. Impressed with their dedication and the spirit, Shaunak Sen, the director decided to film them. As he said, "I am drawn by the subject of the interconnectedness of an ecosystem — one that humans are a part of, not apart from. How man, animals share space and become part of the whole. It is a valuable story."

== Release ==
The film had its world premiere at the 2022 Sundance Film Festival on 22 January 2022. It was also selected for screening at 2022 Cannes Film Festival in 'Special Screenings' section and was screened on 23 May.

The film was released in the United States in fall 2022, along with festival screenings, by Submarine Deluxe, in association with Sideshow.

The film was selected for Documentary Competition in the 46th Hong Kong International Film Festival, where it was screened on 24 August 2022 and won Firebird Award. In September 2022, it was invited to the 18th Zurich Film Festival held from 22 September to 2 October, where it was nominated in documentary competition section. In the same month, it was also selected in main slate of 2022 New York Film Festival held from 30 September – 16 October 2022. It also made it to 'Wide Angle - Documentary Showcase' section of 27th Busan International Film Festival and was screened on 9 October 2022. Next it was selected at BFI London Film Festival held from 5 to 16 October 2022, where it won The Grierson Award in the Documentary Competition; and at the 17th Rome Film Festival in Best of 2022, held from 13 to 23 October.

In 2023, it was selected in 'Films on Environment' section at the 29th Kolkata International Film Festival and will be screened on 7 December 2023.

=== Home media ===
HBO Documentary Films bought the worldwide television rights for the film; following its theatrical run in the United States, it aired on HBO and then began streaming on HBO Max on 7 February 2023.

The film was released on DVD and Blu-ray under the Janus Contemporaries label of the Criterion Collection.

== Reception ==
On the review aggregator website Rotten Tomatoes, 99% of 87 critics' reviews are positive, with an average rating of 8.3/10. The website's consensus reads: "A poetic tribute to tenacity, All That Breathes uses two brothers' tireless efforts to make a broader point about finding triumph within tragedy." Metacritic, which uses a weighted average, assigned the film a score of 87 out of 100, based on 19 critics, indicating "universal acclaim".

Daniel Fienberg of The Hollywood Reporter, reviewing the film wrote, "Sen has encapsulated a vision of New Delhi in which modern life, particularly pollution and overpopulation, have placed new strain on the balance between humans and nature." Praising the film he further stated that the film "is one of the more dreamily provocative documentaries I’ve ever seen." Fienberg concluding his review remarked, "In this tiny marvel of a documentary, it’s a little and a lot all at once". Dennis Harvey reviewing for Variety praised the score of the film, writing, "The meditative yet ingratiating impact is furthered by Roger Goula’s score, which strikes aptly spectral notes." He also appreciated the cinematography and wrote, "There’s an inventive lyricism to the imagery here, aesthetically unified despite three credited cinematographers." Concluding his review Harvey stated, "With a tone more melancholic and charming than one might expect given the various crises at play here, Sen's deceptively casual observational documentary prefers dwelling on resistance and resilience to pronouncements of doom." Josh Flanders and Sheri Flanders of Chicago Reader termed the film, "A soaring visual masterpiece." David Ehrlich of IndieWire graded the film with B+ and praised the framework comparing it with Janusz Kamiński. Ehrlich appreciating the score, sound recording and camerawork wrote, "Roger Goula’s orgiastic synth score (a little Philip Glass, a lot of Dan Deacon) and Niladri Shekhar Roy and Moinak Bose’s visceral sound recording (brace for an entire chorus of rats) complement the micro-attention of the camerawork by hearing a tumult of life in even the most unassuming frame." He concluded, "There is so much life in All That Breathes that you won't be left clamoring for more personality."

Poulomi Das reviewing for Firstpost opined, "Simply as a record of slow-burning ecological tragedy, Sen crafts All That Breathes like a meditative poem, one that is cut to mindful perfection by editors Charlotte Munch Bengtsen and Vedant Joshi. The structure itself is striking in its unadorned approach. There’s poetry in simplicity to be found here.." She also appreciated the cinematography of Ben Bernhard, Riju Das, and Saumyananda Sahi. Das stated, "Sen masterfully reveals the underbelly of the capital, seamlessly merging foreground and background, nature and atmosphere, and the seen and the under-seen. She concluded, "It’s not everyday that you get to see a narrative so attuned to the craft of filmmaking and the beauty of emotion that it results in a hypnotic viewing experience." Tomris Laffly of Harper's Bazaar reviewing the film opined, "Humanity comes in its most selfless in All That Breathes, [which adopts] the interconnectedness of nature and mankind as a guiding principle." Laffly stated Sen unearths something poetic in the [narrative], celebrating slivers of against-the-odds hope in generous sums.

Alissa Wilkinson reviewing the film for Vox stated, " Shaunak Sen’s lyrical portrait of two men who work to save injured and sick birds in the city. Their quest to find resources for their perpetually underfunded operation winds together with meditations on the nature of the birds, particularly kites, birds of prey that have been forced to adapt to the changing city." Wilkinson in conclusion opined that the work two protagonists are doing is a "metaphor for the huge task that bringing healing to the city’s human residents might be, too." Since "we all breathe the same air." Grace Han of Asian Movie Pulse rated the film as 4/5, and praised the cinematography writing, saying, "The camera gazes in awe upon the sheer force of urbanity in the Indian capital – and nature’s ability to adapt accordingly." Terming the film as portrait she wrote "All in all, All That Breathes illustrates a portrait of a delicate ecosystem that is dangerously upset." Han concluded, "As the future heads into uncertain territory, All That Breathes spells out a plea for balance. She further opined, "In this life, everything all that breathes is connected: under the skies, through the air, and the Earth upon which we live." Bilge Ebiri, reviewing for Spirituality & Health wrote, "Stunningly filmed, the film [is] as gorgeous as it is ambitious, as stirring as it is terrifying." Ending his review, Ebiri opined, "And, given the perilous situation all the creatures depicted in this picture are in, one cannot help but wonder if it’s just a matter of time before we are all similarly threatened." Shubhra Gupta of The Indian Express covering the Cannes Film Festival, wrote, "Shaunak Sen’s terrific documentary was as much of a celebration [as Pakistan’s Joyland]."

In her review for Himal Southasian, film critic Anna M. M. Vetticad described All That Breathes as a "poetic and emotionally stirring" cinematic experience. She noted that the documentary seamlessly blends ecological and political commentary into the central narrative, making its overarching themes difficult to compartmentalize. Specifically, Vetticad highlighted how the film transitions from a direct chronicle of Nadeem and Saud's avian rescue mission into an exploration of the precarious social and political position of Muslims in contemporary India. This political subtext is juxtaposed with broader existential questions regarding the ecological interdependence of species.

=== Accolades ===
Award	Date of ceremony	Category	Recipient(s)	Result	Ref.
Sundance Film Festival	30 January 2022	Grand Jury Prize – Documentary	All That Breathes	Won	
Cannes Film Festival	28 May 2022	Golden Eye	Shaunak Sen	Won	
Hong Kong International Film Festival	31 August 2022	Firebird Award	All That Breathes	Won	
Zurich Film Festival	2 October 2022	Best International Documentary Film	All That Breathes	Nominated	
London Film Festival	16 October 2022	Grierson Awards	All That Breathes	Won	
Montclair Film Festival	30 October 2022	Bruce Sinosky Award for Documentary Feature	All That Breathes	Nominated	
Asia Pacific Screen Awards	11 November 2022	Young Cinema Award	All That Breathes	Won	
Critics' Choice Documentary Awards	13 November 2022	Best Science/Nature Documentary	All That Breathes	Nominated	
Critics' Choice Documentary Awards	13 November 2022	Best Cinematography	Benjamin Bernhard and Riju Das	Nominated	
Gotham Awards	28 November 2022	Best Documentary	All That Breathes	Won	
National Board of Review	8 December 2022	Top Five Documentaries	All That Breathes	Won	
IDA Documentary Awards	10 December 2022	Best Feature	All That Breathes	Won	
IDA Documentary Awards	10 December 2022	Best Director	Shaunak Sen	Won	
IDA Documentary Awards	10 December 2022	Best Cinematography	Ben Bernhard, Riju Das, Saumyananda Sahi	Nominated	
IDA Documentary Awards	10 December 2022	Best Editing	Charlotte Munch Bengtsen, Vedant Joshi	Won	
Washington D.C. Area Film Critics Association	12 December 2022	Best Documentary	All That Breathes	Nominated	
Dallas–Fort Worth Film Critics Association	19 December 2022	Best Documentary Film	All That Breathes	2nd place	
Alliance of Women Film Journalists	5 January 2023	Best Documentary	All That Breathes	Nominated	
National Society of Film Critics	7 January 2023	Best Non-Fiction Film	All That Breathes	3rd place	
San Francisco Bay Area Film Critics Circle	9 January 2023	Best Documentary Feature	All That Breathes	Won	
Cinema Eye Honors	12 January 2023	Outstanding Non-Fiction Feature	Shaunak Sen, Aman Mann and Teddy Leifer	Won	
Cinema Eye Honors	12 January 2023	Outstanding Direction	Shaunak Sen	Nominated	
Cinema Eye Honors	12 January 2023	Outstanding Production	Aman Mann, Shaunak Sen and Teddy Leifer	Nominated	
Cinema Eye Honors	12 January 2023	Outstanding Cinematography	Ben Bernhard	Won	
Cinema Eye Honors	12 January 2023	Outstanding Sound Design	Niladri Shekhar Roy and Susmit "Bob" Nath	Nominated	
Cinema Eye Honors	12 January 2023	Audience Choice Prize	All That Breathes	Nominated	
Cinema Eye Honors	12 January 2023	The Unforgettables	Mohammad Saud and Nadeem Shehzad	Won	
Georgia Film Critics Association	13 January 2023	Best Documentary Film	All That Breathes	Nominated	
Online Film Critics Society	23 January 2023	Best Documentary	All That Breathes	Nominated	
London Film Critics' Circle	5 February 2023	Documentary of the Year	All That Breathes	Nominated	
Satellite Awards	11 February 2023	Best Motion Picture – Documentary	All That Breathes	Nominated	
Directors Guild of America Awards	18 February 2023	Outstanding Directorial Achievement in Documentaries	Shaunak Sen	Nominated	
Producers Guild of America Awards	25 February 2023	Outstanding Producer of Documentary Theatrical Motion Pictures	Aman Mann, Shaunak Sen, and Teddy Leifer	Nominated	
British Academy Film Awards	19 February 2023	Best Documentary	Shaunak Sen, Teddy Leifer, Aman Mann	Nominated	
Independent Spirit Awards	4 March 2023	Best Documentary Feature	Shaunak Sen, Teddy Leifer, Aman Mann	Nominated	
American Society of Cinematographers	5 March 2023	Outstanding Achievement in Cinematography in Documentary	Ben Bernhard and Riju Das	Won	
Academy Awards	12 March 2023	Best Documentary Feature	Shaunak Sen, Aman Mann, and Teddy Leifer	Nominated	
Grierson Awards	9 November 2023	Best Single Documentary – International	All That Breathes	Won	
Grierson Awards	9 November 2023	Best Cinema Documentary	All That Breathes	Won	
Peabody Awards	June 9, 2024	Portrait of Empathy and Interconnectivity Between Nature and Man	Shaunak Sen, Aman Mann, and Teddy Leifer	Won	
