= The Art of Political Murder =

- Official poster
- Directed by: Paul Taylor
- Produced by: Regina K. Scully; Teddy Leifer
- Cinematography: Tom Turley
- Edited by: Masahiro Hirakubo
- Music by: Yann McCullough
- Production companies: HBO Documentary Films; Smokehouse Pictures; Artemis Rising Foundation; Rise Films
- Distributed by: HBO
- Release date: December 16, 2020 (United States)
- Running time: 89 minutes
- Country: United States
- Language: English

The Art of Political Murder is a 2020 American documentary film directed by Paul Taylor, based on the book of the same name by Francisco Goldman. It follows the murder of Juan José Gerardi Conedera, a human rights activist who was murdered after presenting a damaging report of atrocities committed during the Guatemalan Civil War. George Clooney and Grant Heslov serve as executive producers under their Smoke House Pictures banner.

It was released on December 16, 2020, by HBO.

== Synopsis ==
The film follows the murder of Juan José Gerardi Conedera, a human rights activist who was murdered after presenting a damaging report of atrocities committed during the Guatemalan Civil War, following the investigation that took place into the murder exposing more corruption and violence.

== Book ==
Francisco Goldman, who wrote the book on which the film is based, is the child of a Guatemalan mother and spent much of his youth in the country. Upon its publication in 2007, it was listed among the year’s best or notable books by publications including the New York Times, Washington Post, Chicago Tribune, and San Francisco Chronicle. HBO Documentary Films announced it would co-produce the screen adaptation of Goldman’s book in May 2019.

== Production ==
In May 2019, it was announced HBO Documentary Films would produce and distribute the film, with Paul Taylor set to direct the film, with George Clooney and Grant Heslov set to serve as executive producers under their Smokehouse Pictures banner.

== Release ==
The film was set to have its world premiere at the Tribeca Film Festival in April 2020, however, the festival was cancelled due to the COVID-19 pandemic. It was released on December 16, 2020.
