= Mark Twain Hotel (Chicago) =

- U.S. National Register of Historic Places
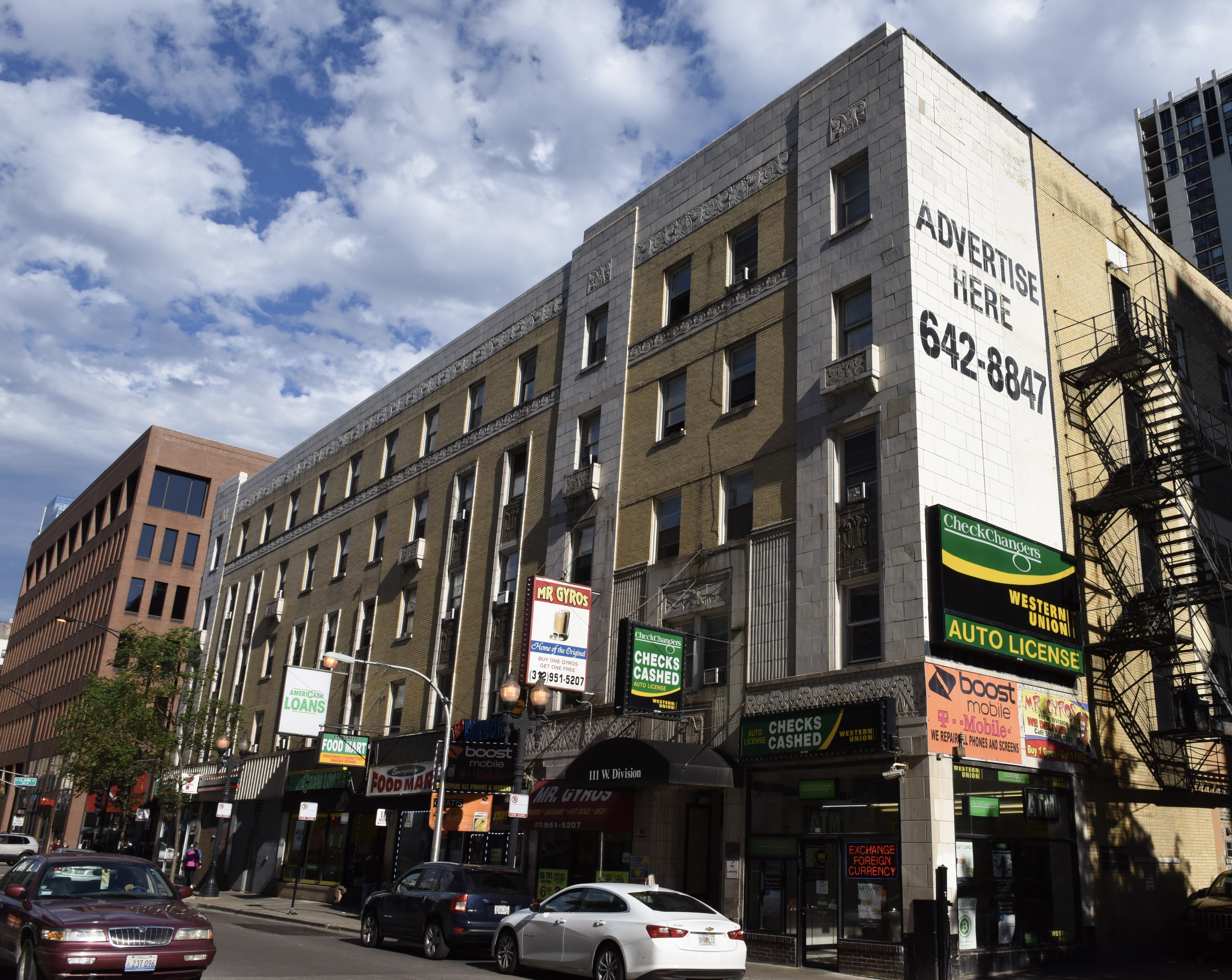

- Location within Chicago metropolitan area Location within Illinois Location within the United States
- Location: 111 W. Division Street, Chicago, Illinois
- Coordinates: 41°54′14″N 87°37′55″W
- Built: 1930
- Architect: Harry Glube
- Architectural style: Art Deco
- NRHP reference No.: 100000961
- Added to NRHP: May 8, 2017

The Mark Twain Hotel is a historic residential hotel located at 111 W. Division Street in the Near North Side community area of Chicago, Illinois. Built in 1930 by developer Fred Becklenberg, the hotel was one of several residential hotels built to house the influx of labor to Chicago in the late 1920s. Most of the hotel's residents were permanent; according to 1940 census records, the majority had been at the hotel for over five years. Architect Harry Glube designed the hotel in the Art Deco style, a departure from the revival styles normally used for residential hotels. The brick building features extensive terra cotta detailing, including an elaborate cornice and stringcourse above and below the fourth floor.

The building was added to the National Register of Historic Places on May 8, 2017.

The building was renovated starting in 2018 and celebrated a grand re-opening in 2020. During the renovation it was converted to 148 typical but affordable rental studio apartments by NHP Foundation.

The Mark Twain Hotel is a significant location in Naomi Hirahara's 2021 mystery novel Clark and Division. The book follows a Japanese-American family’s move to Chicago in 1944 after being released from the Manzanar concentration camp. The narrator's sister, Rose Ito, lives across the street from the hotel before being fatally struck by a train at the nearby Clark and Division train station. Several other characters work at the hotel.
