= Interface Media Group =

Entertainment Company

- Company type: Private
- Industry: Media agency, video production
- Founded: 1977
- Founder: Tom Angell
- Headquarters: Washington D.C., U.S.
- Key people: Jeff Weingarten
- Website: interfacemedia.com

Interface Media Group, Inc. is a media agency providing audio, graphic design, video production and digital creative services in the Washington metropolitan area.

Founded in 1977, IMG's production facilities occupy approximately 40,000 square feet (3,700 m^{2}) in downtown Washington D.C., and house 50+ artists, editors, production management personnels and more.

Interface Media Group's works can be found in documentaries and entertainment programs that have aired on CNN, ESPN, HBO, PBS, the Discovery Networks, TLC, and the National Geographic Channel. In addition, they have worked with national and international organizations, including Broadcast Television Networks, cable networks, advertising agencies, political campaigns, galleries and museums, State and Federal Government agencies, independent film makers, Corporations and associations.

== History ==
Incorporated on February 7, 1977, as Interface Video Systems, Inc., by Tom Angell, the company opened its door for business on May 2 of that year with three employees and one linear editing bay. On March 1, 2007, the company was sold to longtime employee Jeff Weingarten and the company name was officially changed to Interface Media Group, Inc. The company now has 45 employees and 26 production and post production suites.

Throughout their 4-decade existence, Interface Media Group (IMG) has received many awards, including Emmy Awards, ADDY Awards, Telly Awards, CINE Golden Eagles, TIVA Peer Awards, Davey Awards, Marcom Awards, W3 Awards, and more. In May 2017, DC Office of Cable, Television, Film, Music & Entertainment recognized IMG as the location of the Month. IMG was honored with distinction to celebrate their 40 years of media production service to the Washington DC area.

== Notable work ==
Throughout its history in the industry, Interface Media Group has worked with numerous clients on various types of projects. Notable projects include:

=== Ted Turner's Avoiding Armageddon ===
Interface Media Group was approached with the task of coordinating the post production and finishing of philanthropist Ted Turner's film Avoiding Armageddon. The eight-hour documentary series was created to raise awareness of the dangers of nuclear, biological and chemical weapons and the growing access to them. For this project, IMG created an integrated approach with the documentary's production staff by setting up special offices for all 30 employees. Having all works done under one roof allowed the team to not only navigate changes to both the context and content, but also keep up with the tight schedule. In the end, this program aired in the U.S. on PBS over four consecutive nights in early spring 2003 as the war in Iraq raged and the effects of weapons of mass destruction were at its peak.

=== Comcast NBCUniversal's "Voices of the Civil Rights Movement" ===
Comcast partnered with The Newseum to create an immersive experience for a collection of more than 200 civil rights era news clips. IMG created a customized interactive touch-screen kiosk where users could navigate these historical clips, some dating back to the 1960s, using a range of factors (name, date, location of event, topic, etc.). The success of this project led to the UX/UI design being reprogrammed for an online version and the National Civil Rights Museum.

=== HBO's K Street ===
Premiering in the fall of 2003, K Street, a weekly Sunday night docudrama on HBO that mixed fiction and reality on the K Street in Washington, D.C. Produced by Steven Soderbergh and George Clooney, the series centered around members of a fictional lobbying and political consulting firm rubbing elbows with real politicians and lawmakers, wheeling and dealing, spinning and twisting, trying to skew national politics, policy, regulation and law to their paying client's advantage. The challenge for IMG, one of the series' production studios, was creating concepts each week based on real ongoing political news. Each unscripted episode began with weekly morning concept development then filming began with five synchronous hand held cameras. IMG set up an editorial suite on set, to immediately digitize and edit footage. After the around the clock editing was complete, it was sent off to IMG headquarters for color correction, audio mixing, film graining, audio playback and packaging. Each episode was mastered and quality controlled by the end of the work week and ready for its Sunday night debut.

=== Living History audio book ===
In 2003, then New York Senator Hillary Rodham Clinton partnered with Simon & Schuster Audio to publish an audio book alongside the release of the hardcover book Living History. They chose Interface Media Group to record and produce this seven hour recording, marking the 3rd time IMG worked on an audio book for the former first lady. The previous books included It Takes a Village and Dear Socks, Dear Buddy.

=== PBS Kids channel ===
In 2017 PBS launched a new, nationally broadcast, children's television channel to play PBS Kids programming 24 hours a day, 7 days a week. IMG helped PBS Kids created teasers, promos, channel packaging and other branded content which totaled to over 220 elements for the roll out of the new station. With a task this large, every department from audio and editing, to design and animation, pitched in to complete the pieces on time. The 24/7 station premiered on 107 PBS stations, which covers 90% of the U.S. TV households, on April 21, 2017.

=== Intelsat Wall ===
Intelsat, a leading provider of global satellite communication services, wanted a media wall in their headquarters to showcase their impressive fleet of satellites. IMG embraced the challenge of designing content for the massive 24 monitor display. our design team created a 3D photo-real animation of Intelsat's entire fleet as they orbit around a gleaming earth. Select satellites will expand periodically highlighting the launch date, model, and coverage area for each. IMG worked closely with the Intelsat team to not only reflect the important detail of the animation but also as a technical consultant for installation of the wall. Because of the success of the wall, IMG continues to create new products for Intelsat's ever evolving brand.

=== Events DC – Experience ===
In 2016, IMG worked with Events DC to create a 360 video to showcase their venues and events that happen throughout the year. IMG capture footage from multiple Event DC properties including Stadium Armory, The Walter E. Washington Convention Center, and RFK Stadium. With the goal of immersing the viewer into an event, 360-video created an environment where users could look around freely throughout a scene, giving them the feeling of presence. Being one of the first management companies to utilize this technology allows Events DC to pitch their properties as the destination for hosting events.
