= Shaunak Sen =

Indian documentary filmmaker (1987-)

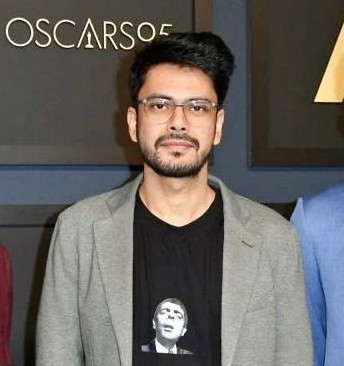
- Born: 26 June 1987 (age 39); Calcutta, West Bengal, India
- Education: Jawaharlal Nehru University A.J.K. Mass Communication Research Centre
- Occupation: Filmmaker
- Years active: 2013–present

Shaunak Sen is an Academy award nominated Indian filmmaker, video artist and film scholar. His documentary film on environmental issues, All That Breathes, won the Grand Jury Prize in the World Cinema Documentary Competition at 2022 Sundance Film Festival and the Golden Eye award for the best documentary at 2022 Cannes Film Festival. It was also nominated for the Academy Award for Best Documentary Feature. The documentary then won a Peabody Award at the 84th ceremony for "its graceful portrait of empathy and interconnectivity between nature and man".

== Education ==
Sen graduated in Mass Communication from A.J.K. Mass Communication Research Centre Jamia Milia, New Delhi, and obtained a Ph.D. from the School of Arts and Aesthetics at the Jawaharlal Nehru University in Delhi. His academic and early professional work won support from various organizations, including the Films Division of India Documentary Fellowship (2013), CSDS-Sarai Digital and Social Media Fellowship (2014), Pro Helvetia Residency (2016) and the Charles Wallace Fellowship (2018). He also participated in Cambridge University's ERC Urban Ecologies project as a visiting scholar in 2018.

== Career ==
Sen, along with Amitesh Grover and Frank Oberhausser, co-conceptualized Downtime, a live installation event across Delhi and Berlin that allowed audiences to explore practices across sleep in public territories, private spaces, and digitally networked environments. With Arnika Ahldag and Grover, he was co-curator of Notes on Mourning, a live performance and video installation in January 2015. He was also part of the Copycat Academy Residency, curated by Hannah Hurtzig at the Luminato Film Festival in Toronto in June 2015.

Sen's first feature-length documentary, a "sensitive unpacking of the geographies of homelessness and sleep in Delhi", Cities of Sleep funded by the Films Division of India was released in 2016. The film was screened at 16th edition of the New York Indian Film Festival, Taiwan International Documentary Festival, and Mumbai International Film Festival. Screened at over 20 other international festivals, the documentary won six awards.

Sen's second feature-length documentary All That Breathes premiered on 21 January 2022 in the Sundance Film Festival's World Cinema Documentary Competition. Two brothers Saud and Nadeem were raised in New Delhi, looking at a sky speckled with black kites, watching as relatives tossed meat up to these birds of prey. Muslim belief held that feeding the kites would expel troubles. Now, birds are falling from the polluted, opaque skies of New Delhi and the two brothers have made it their life’s work to care for the injured black kites.

The documentary won the World Cinema Grand Jury Prize: Documentary at the Sundance Film Festival, with one juror saying "This poetic film delivers an urgent political story while constructing a singular and loving portrait of protagonists resisting seemingly inevitable ecological disaster – with humorous touches punctuated by unsentimental depiction of the animal kingdom." The documentary also won the L'Œil d'or (Golden Eye), the top award for documentary films, at the 75th Cannes Film Festival in 2022, with the jury saying "The Golden Eye goes to a film that, in a world of destruction, reminds us that every life matters, and every small action matters. You can grab your camera, you can save a bird, you can hunt for some moments of stealing beauty, it matters. It's an inspirational journey in observation of three Don Quixotes who may not save the whole world but do save their world."

Following the Cannes screening of All That Breathes, HBO announced that it had acquired worldwide television rights to the documentary. A theatrical release in the USA through Submarine Deluxe and Sideshow was followed by a release on HBO Max. The documentary then won a Peabody Award at the 84th awards ceremony.

== Filmography ==
Year	Title	Worked as	Note	Ref.
2013	Squad's Fall Guys	Editor		
2013	Old Town	Editor		
2014	T&Lily	Editor		
2016	Cities of Sleep	Writer/ Director	Screened at NYIFF, TIDF, and MIFF	
2022	All That Breathes	Director/ Producer	Won Grand Jury Prizes in World Cinema Documentary Competition at 2022 Sundance Film Festival and Golden Eye award for the best documentary at 2022 Cannes Film Festival	

== Accolades ==
Award	Date of ceremony	Category	Recipient(s)	Result	Ref.
Cannes Film Festival	May 28, 2022	Golden Eye	Shaunak Sen	Won	
IDA Documentary Awards	December 10, 2022	Best Director	Shaunak Sen	Won	
Cinema Eye Honors	January 12, 2023	Outstanding Non-Fiction Feature	Shaunak Sen, Aman Mann and Teddy Leifer	Won	
Cinema Eye Honors	January 12, 2023	Outstanding Direction	Shaunak Sen	Nominated	
Directors Guild of America Awards	February 18, 2023	Outstanding Directorial Achievement in Documentaries	Shaunak Sen	Nominated	
Producers Guild of America Awards	February 25, 2023	Outstanding Producer of Documentary Theatrical Motion Pictures	Aman Mann, Shaunak Sen, and Teddy Leifer	Nominated	
British Academy Film Awards	February 19, 2023	Best Documentary	Shaunak Sen, Teddy Leifer, Aman Mann	Nominated	
Independent Spirit Awards	March 4, 2023	Best Documentary Feature	Shaunak Sen, Teddy Leifer, Aman Mann	Nominated	
Academy Awards	March 12, 2023	Best Documentary Feature	Shaunak Sen, Aman Mann, and Teddy Leifer	Nominated	
Peabody Awards	June 9, 2024	Portrait of Empathy and Interconnectivity Between Nature and Man	Shaunak Sen, Aman Mann, and Teddy Leifer	Won	
