= Clybourn Corridor =

Shopping district in northern Illinois, US

Coordinates: 41.912°N 87.653°W

The Clybourn Corridor is a shopping district in Lincoln Park, stretching into the Near North Side in Chicago, Illinois. It serves as one of the residential Northside's many shopping districts and includes retailers like Apple Inc., Crate & Barrel & CB2, Eddie Bauer, Forever 21, and Sur La Table, among many others. The New City shopping center includes Dick's Sporting Goods, AMC Theaters, a Kings Bowl, and Chicago's largest Mariano's grocery store. The development also includes an apartment tower featuring 199 units. This is part of a continuing trend of adding apartments and condos to the corridor in an effort to stem rising prices in the surrounding area.

The district is serviced by the CTA Red Line stop North/Clybourn. Apple Inc. and the CTA collaborated to redesign a former bus turnaround separating the Apple Store and CTA Station into a pedestrian plaza with Parisian park chairs and a water feature.
