= Paul Taylor (director) =

British film director

Paul Taylor, born in Newcastle, is a British director of the award-winning documentary film We Are Together. In 2020, he directed The Art of Political Murder, about the 1998 killing of Guatemalan Bishop Juan Gerardi Conedera.

== Biography ==
Paul Taylor studied film at the Arts University Bournemouth. He did some volunteering work in the Agape Orphanage in South Africa in 2003 and started shooting We Are Together while he was still a student. It took him four years to complete the documentary.
