= Dreamcatcher (2015 film) =

Documentary film by Kim Longinotto

- Release poster
- Directed by: Kim Longinotto
- Produced by: Lisa Stevens; Teddy Leifer
- Edited by: Oliver Huddleston
- Music by: Stuart Earl
- Production companies: Rise Films; Green Acres Films; Vixen Films
- Distributed by: Dogwoof (United Kingdom); Showtime (United States)
- Release dates: 25 January 2015 (Sundance); 6 March 2015 (United Kingdom); 27 March 2015 (United States)
- Running time: 104 minutes
- Countries: United Kingdom; United States
- Language: English

Dreamcatcher is a 2015 documentary film directed by Kim Longinotto focusing on Brenda Myers-Powell, a former professional who runs The Dreamcatcher Foundation, a charity which helps women in Chicago leave the sex industry. The film won the World Cinema Directing Award in the documentary category at the 2015 Sundance Film Festival.

The film was released in cinemas and on video on demand in the United Kingdom on 6 March 2015 by Dogwoof. In the United States, it aired on Showtime on 27 March 2015.

== Production ==
The film's producer Lisa Stevens found the story in 2009 while making Crack House USA in Chicago. Stevens nurtured the relationship with Brenda Myers-Powell and Stephanie Daniels-Wilson for several years. Stevens began writing and shaping the story of Dreamcatcher for a feature documentary film in 2010. In 2011, Stevens was introduced to Kim Longinotto, and asked her to direct the film. Teddy Leifer raised the money needed to make the film. The film was shot in ten weeks in Chicago. Principal photography began in September 2013. Wilfred Spears served as associate producer for this film.

== Reception ==
On the review aggregator website Rotten Tomatoes, the film holds an approval rating of 100% based on 31 reviews, with an average rating of 8.2/10. The website's critics consensus reads, "Unforgettable and deeply moving, Dreamcatcher uses an extraordinary true personal story to make emphatic socioeconomic arguments." Metacritic, which uses a weighted average, assigned the film a score of 86 out of 100, based on 11 critics, indicating "universal acclaim". Screen Daily critic Mark Adams gave Dreamcatcher a positive review, writing that "as expected from such a talented filmmaker she [Longinotto] constructs a film that veers between amusing and absorbing through to grim."
