= Grant Heslov =

American actor and filmmaker (born 1963)

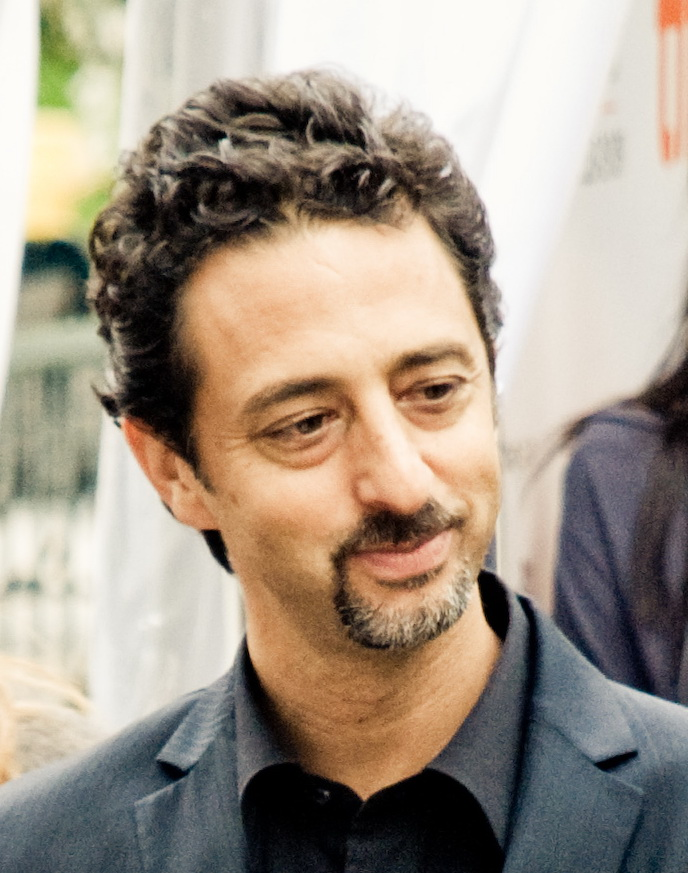
- Heslov in 2009
- Occupations: Actor; filmmaker; writer
- Years active: 1982–present
- Spouse: Lysa Hayland-Heslov
- Children: 2

Grant Heslov is an American actor and filmmaker known for his producing and writing collaborations with George Clooney, which have earned him four Oscar nominations. As a co-producer of Argo (2012), he received the Academy Award for Best Picture in 2013. As an actor, he has appeared in films including True Lies (1994), Black Sheep (1996), Enemy of the State (1998), and The Scorpion King (2002), as well as performing supporting roles in several films made with Clooney.

== Personal life ==
Heslov was raised in the Palos Verdes area of Los Angeles County. His father, Arthur Heslov, was a dentist, and his mother, Jerrie (née Rosen), a businesswoman. He has two older brothers, Steven and Michael. Heslov is Jewish.

He attended Palos Verdes High School, then the University of Southern California . He is a member of Phi Kappa Psi.

Heslov is married to Lysa Hayland-Heslov, a producer.

== Career ==
Heslov's acting credits include the films True Lies, Dante's Peak, Enemy of the State, The Scorpion King, Good Night and Good Luck, Congo, Black Sheep, and Catch Me If You Can. He has also appeared in such TV series as Murder, She Wrote, Happy Days, Seinfeld, Family Ties, Spencer, Mama's Family, L.A. Law, Matlock, Sleeper Cell and The X-Files.

In 2001, he joined Section Eight Productions as director of development, and then he became head of the television division when they started its business in 2003.

In August 2006, Heslov and George Clooney started Smokehouse Pictures and began writing screenplays for production. He was nominated for an Academy Award for Best Original Screenplay (with Clooney) and as producer for Best Film for Good Night, and Good Luck. Clooney and Heslov also won the Golden Osella for Best Screenplay for the film. Heslov also appears in the film as Don Hewitt, the director of the TV series See It Now, around which the movie is centered. He directed a screen adaptation of The Men Who Stare at Goats, starring Clooney, Ewan McGregor, Jeff Bridges, and Kevin Spacey and co-produced The American starring Clooney in 2012. He also worked on 2011's The Ides of March. In June 2012, he was invited to join the Academy of Motion Picture Arts and Sciences.

In 2013, Heslov, alongside Clooney and Ben Affleck, won the Academy Award for Best Picture for Argo (2012). The three also won the Golden Globe Award for Best Motion Picture – Drama and the BAFTA Award for Best Film.

Heslov directed the first and fifth episodes of the 2019 miniseries Catch-22, on which he was also executive producer.

In 2024, it was announced Heslov and George Clooney will co-write and Clooney will star in Good Night, and Good Luck, a Broadway adaptation of the film Good Night, and Good Luck. For the play, he was nominated for a Drama League Award and won the 2025 Outer Critics Circle John Gassner Award for Playwriting with Clooney.

== Filmography ==
Year	Title	Producer	Writer	Director
1998	Waiting for Woody		Yes	Himself (featurette)
2003	Intolerable Cruelty	Co-producer		Joel Coen
2005	Good Night, and Good Luck	Yes	Yes	George Clooney
2008	Leatherheads	Yes		George Clooney
2009	The Men Who Stare at Goats	Yes		Himself
2010	The American	Yes		Anton Corbijn
2011	The Ides of March	Yes	Yes	George Clooney
2012	Argo	Yes		Ben Affleck
2013	August: Osage County	Yes		John Wells
2014	The Monuments Men	Yes	Yes	George Clooney
2015	Our Brand Is Crisis	Yes		David Gordon Green
2016	Money Monster	Yes		Jodie Foster
2017	Suburbicon	Yes	Yes	George Clooney
2020	The Midnight Sky	Yes		George Clooney
2023	The Boys in the Boat	Yes		George Clooney
2024	Wolfs	Yes		Jon Watts
2025	Surviving Ohio State	Yes		Eva Orner
TBA	Red Platoon	Yes		Daniel Espinosa

Executive producer

- Playground (2009) (Documentary)
- The Art of Political Murder (2020) (Documentary)
- Ticket to Paradise (2022)
- How to Build a Truth Engine (2023) (Documentary)

Acting roles

Year	Title	Role	Notes
1985	The Journey of Natty Gann	Parker's Gang	
1985	The Boys Next Door	Joe Gonzales	
1986	Legal Eagles	Usher	
1988	Sunset	Car Attendant	
1988	License to Drive	Karl	
1989	Dangerous Curves	Wally Wilder	
1989	Catch Me if You Can	Nevil	
1990	Vital Signs	Rick	
1993	Seinfeld	Car Thief	Episode: The Smelly Car
1994	True Lies	Faisal	
1995	Congo	Richard	
1996	Black Sheep	Robbie Mieghem	
1996	The Birdcage	National Enquirer Photographer	
1997	Dante's Peak	Greg	
1998	Enemy of the State	Lenny	
1998	Waiting for Woody	Josh Silver	
2000	Rocket Power	Lance (voice)	Episode: "Big Air Dare"
2002	Bug	Gordon - Guy in Bug Suit	
2002	The Scorpion King	Arpid	
2002	Justice League	Doctor (voice)	Episode: "Injustice for All"
2005	Good Night, and Good Luck	Don Hewitt	
2008	Leatherheads	Saul Keller	
2012	Lost Angeles	Film Producer	
2014	The Monuments Men	Battlefield Doctor	

== Awards and nominations ==
Year	Award	Category	Work	Result	Ref.
2006	Academy Award	Best Picture	Good Night, and Good Luck	Nominated	
2006	Academy Award	Best Original Screenplay	Good Night, and Good Luck	Nominated	
2006	Golden Globe Award	Best Motion Picture – Drama	Good Night, and Good Luck	Nominated	
2006	Golden Globe Award	Best Screenplay	Good Night, and Good Luck	Nominated	
2012	Academy Award	Best Adapted Screenplay	The Ides of March	Nominated	
2012	Golden Globe Award	Best Screenplay	The Ides of March	Nominated	
2012	AACTA International Award	Best Screenplay	The Ides of March	Won	
2013	Academy Award	Best Picture	Argo	Won	
2013	BAFTA Award	Best Film	Argo	Won	
2013	Broadcast Film Critics Association Award	Best Film	Argo	Won	
2013	César Award	Best Foreign Film	Argo	Won	
2013	Golden Globe Award	Best Motion Picture – Drama	Argo	Won	
2013	Producers Guild of America Award	Best Theatrical Motion Picture	Argo	Won	
2013	AACTA International Award	Best Film	Argo	Nominated	
2013	Satellite Award	Best Film	Argo	Nominated	
2025	Drama League Award	Outstanding Production of a Play	Good Night, and Good Luck	Nominated	
2025	Outer Critics Circle Award	John Gassner Award	Good Night, and Good Luck	Won	
