= Teenage Wasteland (2025 film) =

2025 documentary film

Teenage Wasteland is a 2025 Netflix documentary film which explores how, from 1991 to 1997, a group of student journalists and their teacher, Fred Isseks, at Middletown High School in Middletown, New York, exposed the conspiracy to cover up a toxic waste dump on an aquifer in Middletown and in the adjoining town of Wallkill. The film describes alleged effects of the dump, including birth defects and high cancer rates.

The film interviews Isseks and several of the former students, almost three decades after they participated in the project, which resulted in several student films, including Garbage, Gangsters and Greed (1997). Teenage Wasteland uses the students' footage and other archival footage to tell the story. It was directed by Amanda McBaine and Jesse Moss, and written by McBaine, Moss and Danny Breen. The student project exposed government corruption and organized crime connections that were part of a wider New York State dumping conspiracy.
