= Anxiety dream =

Dream that causes distress or unease

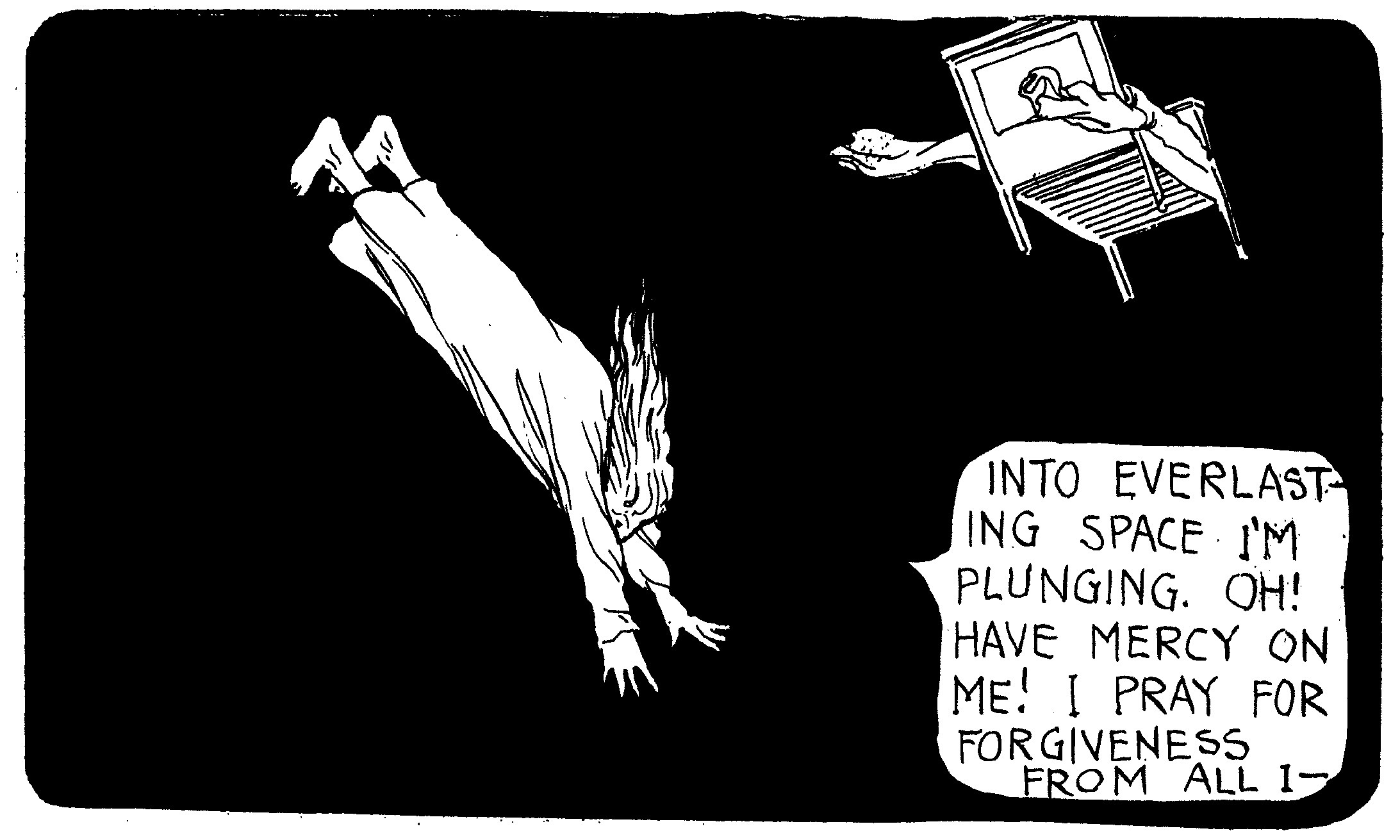
Depiction of a dream of falling, from the early 20th century comic strip Dream of the Rarebit Fiend

An anxiety dream is an unpleasant dream which can be more disturbing than a nightmare. Anxiety dreams are characterized by the feelings of unease, distress, or apprehension in the dreamer upon waking. Anxiety dreams tend to occur in rapid eye movement sleep, and usual themes involve incomplete tasks, embarrassment, falling, getting in to legal or financial trouble, failed pursuits and being pursued by another, often an unrealistic entity but other human beings can also be the pursuer. Anxiety dreams may be caused by childhood trauma, or an adult dealing with conflict. Though they create anxiety in the dreamer, anxiety dreams also serve as a way for a person's ego to reset.

In contrast to the supernatural and somatic origins for dreams proposed in classical dream theory, anxiety dreams were considered to be continuations of the thoughts when interrupted by sleep. Such references are found (cryptically) in Greek authors, including the pre-Socratics and Herodotus, and (more explicitly) in Ecclesiastes 5:3 and Ecclesiasticus 34:1-7 (Book of Sirach). Aristotle confirmed in the Problemata that waking thoughts are continued in sleep, and that even some prophetic (normally divinely inspired) dreams may result from anxiety continued in a dream.

== Classification and provenance ==
Most individuals, when woken by a disturbing dream, would label it as a nightmare; but dream classification is not that simple. Anxiety dreams, punishment dreams, nightmares, post-trauma dreams, and night terrors are difficult to distinguish because they are commonly clumped under the term "nightmare". The different types of dreams, however, have different qualities. The stage in which the dream occurs is key. Anxiety dreams, punishment dreams, nightmares, or post-trauma dreams occur in the REM stage of sleep, while night terrors will occur in the NREM stage.

Ernest Jones, author of On The Nightmare, states that the characteristics of a nightmare are: "Intense or agonizing dread; the sense of oppression or of weight on the chest which dangerously threatens the continuation of breathing; and the dreamer’s conviction of being helpless or paralyzed." Published in 1911, these characteristics lasted sixty years until American sleep researcher, Charles Fisher, and his colleagues recognized that they were too broad. Fisher concluded that distressing dreams in REM sleep will contain the feeling of weight on the chest and sense of helplessness, but the intense or agonizing dread is a characteristic of NREM dreams. These dreams are more commonly known as night terrors.

The division of distressing dreams within REM sleep is subtle. The distinction between an anxiety dream and a nightmare comes down to what, contributing author of The Nightmare, Ruth Bers Shapiro calls the "profoundly disturbing" content that distinguishes the nightmare from the anxiety dream.

== Common themes ==
Common themes in anxiety dreams involve incomplete tasks. These can include such things as a suitcase that has not been packed or an exam that has not been taken. Another common theme is the loss of a family member. Freud places these dreams into two categories: "those in which there is sorrow attached to the death and those in which there is no grief." Other themes can involve embarrassment. The dream of falling or being chased is also prevalent in anxiety dreams. These usually take place at the onset of sleep during pictorial consciousness and have little structure or plot.

== Pre-Freudian explanations ==
=== In literature ===
Anxiety dreams have a long tradition in (Western) literature, beginning with Homer, who describes in Book 12 of the Iliad how Achilles is unable to catch up with Hector, "As in a dream a man is not able to follow one who runs from him, nor can the runner escape, nor the other pursue him, so he could not run him down in his speed, nor the other get clear." This anxiety of not being able to escape (or catch up) was borrowed from Homer by Virgil in Book XII of the Aeneid, where Turnus is unable to catch up with Aeneas; subsequently the dream is found (always in simile, never reported directly) in Oppian's Halieutica, in Torquato Tasso's Jerusalem Delivered, and in Phineas Fletcher's Locusts and Purple Island, to be "burlesqued" in Samuel Butler's Hudibras. An anxiety dream related more directly is Eve's in Books 4 and 5 of John Milton's Paradise Lost, who dreams prophetically that she will eat of the fruit of the forbidden tree, an event that will take place in Book 9. Other such anxiety dreams are found in the Anglo-Saxon elegy "The Wanderer" and in Arthurian romances such as Wolfram von Eschenbach's Parzival and Sir Gawain and the Green Knight (ll. 1750-55).

=== Supposed origin ===
In contrast to the supernatural and somatic origins for dreams proposed in classical dream theory, anxiety dreams were considered to be continuations of the thoughts when interrupted by sleep. Such references are found (cryptically) in Greek authors including the pre-Socratics and Herodotus, and (more explicitly) in Ecclesiastes 5:3 and Ecclesiasticus 34:1-7. Aristotle confirmed in the Problemata that waking thoughts are continued in sleep, and that even some prophetic (normally divinely inspired) dreams may result from anxiety continued in a dream. This theory is confirmed by Cicero (De diviniatione), Lucretius, and Petronius (Fragment 31). An English translation of a well-known medieval couplet by seventeenth-century poet Abraham Cowley: "What in the day he fears of future woe / At night in dreams, like truth, affrights his mind".

== Freudian theory ==
=== Function ===
Freud’s theory is explained in his Interpretation of Dreams. One aspect of Freud’s work was his wish fulfillment theory; however, anxiety dreams were not always thought to fit within this theory as normal human nature is to avoid anxiety. Freud expected others to point out the discrepancy, and psychoanalyst Charles Brenner did just that. Freud countered Brenner by explaining the different ways that anxiety dreams and wish fulfillment could be intertwined. Freud gave one specific example in which a child dreamt his mother had gone missing and he had no one to comfort him. Freud explained, "the child dreamt of exchanging endearments with his mother and of sleeping with her; but all the pleasure was transformed into anxiety, and all the ideational content into its opposite." In this way the function of the anxiety dream is to disguise the unsavory wish fulfillment with a sense of punishment and resulting anxiety.

== Causes ==
One suggested cause of anxiety dreams is childhood trauma. A factor in this is the developing ego of the child. This is especially true of children about one year in age. At this age anxiety dreams occur because the child's ego can't integrate his or her daily experiences. Shapiro also explains that the growing ego is easily affected by trauma and conflicts the child may be experiencing. This is an important factor because the ego-defense mechanisms (e.g. repression and intellectualization) are key in staving off anxiety dreams and nightmares.

Conflict in a child's life as well as the approaching of developmental stages can also cause anxiety dreams. For example, there may be conflict present as a child begins toilet training. "Toilet training precipitates conflicts between the wish to soil and fear of loss of parental love. If, during this period, the child is subject to disturbing experiences which leave him feeling helpless and unprotected, his anxiety over parental disapproval is exacerbated." This anxiety could likely lead to anxiety dreams in a child.

== Effects ==
=== Positive ===
Anxiety dreams have an important function. When the ego has been overworked, often the only way it can reset is when one wakes up. Anxiety dreams will build until the dreamer is forced to wake and thus let the ego refocus. Shapiro also noted that anxiety dreams may serve in "alerting the dreamer to a psychologically dangerous situation".

=== Negative ===
General anxiety is a negative effect of anxiety dreams. Individuals dealing with distress in their dreams have been found to have general anxiety more often than those who were experiencing real life events that could be equally as stressful.

== Treatments ==
Barry Kraków developed three steps to alleviate any anxiety dream or nightmare. These steps include:

- Learning imagery techniques
- Recording the dreams
- Changing the dreams

Once a person has been taught the first step he/she can continue using the second and third steps to overcome any new anxiety dreams that might develop.

If more help is needed one might consider workshops that utilize psychodrama and psychotherapeutic techniques. As doctorandus Herma Reeskamp explains, workshops such as these aim to "help patients change the haunting themes of their nightmares and anxiety-filled dreams".
