= North/Clybourn station =

Chicago "L" station

North/Clybourn 1600N 800W
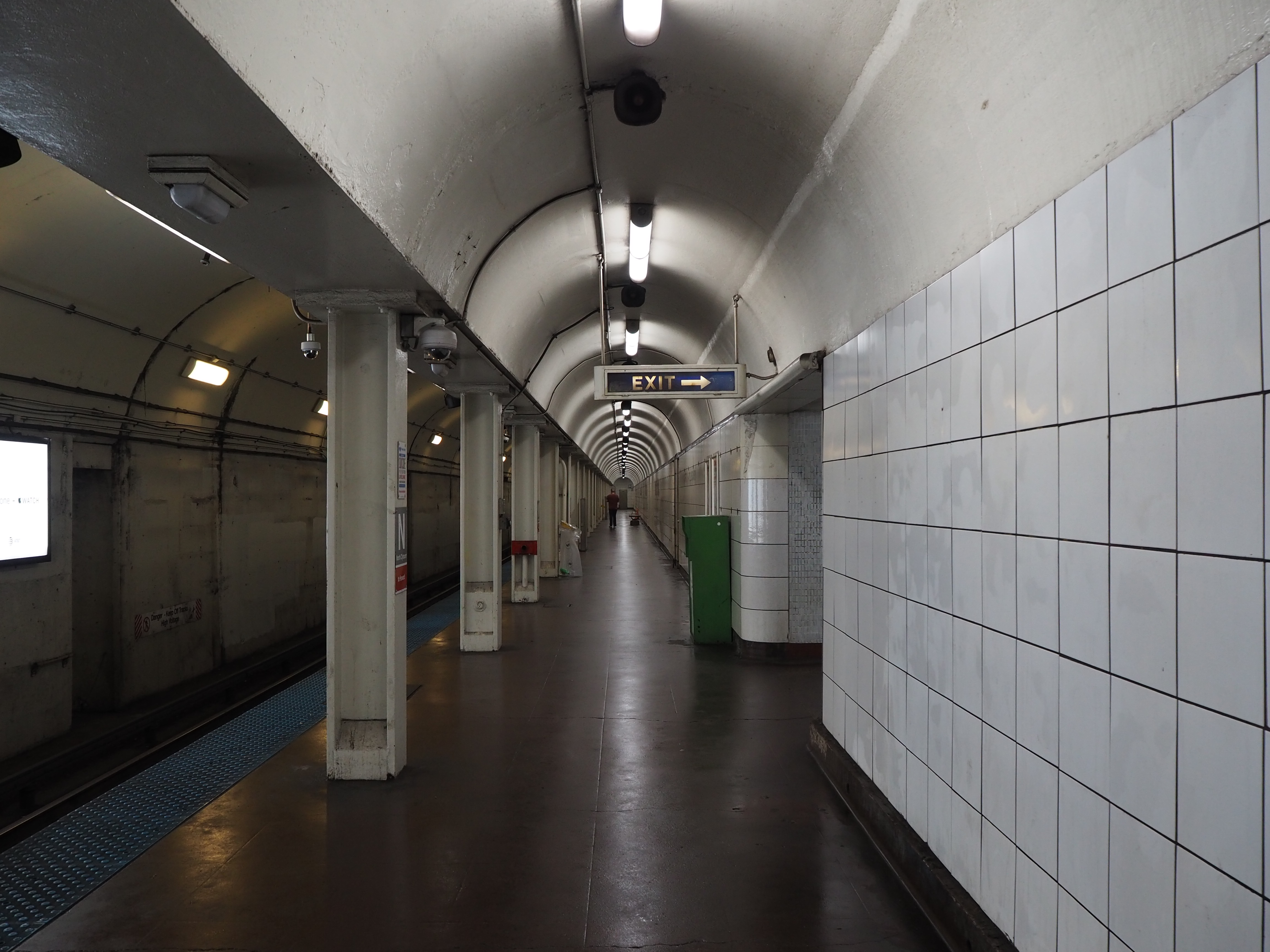
- Howard-bound platform

General information
- Location: 1599 North Clybourn Avenue; Chicago, Illinois 60642
- Coordinates: 41.910655°N 87.649177°W
- Owner: City of Chicago
- Line: State Street subway
- Platforms: 2 side platforms
- Tracks: 2

Construction
- Structure type: Subway
- Depth: 23 ft (7.0 m)
- Cycle facilities: Yes
- Accessible: No

History
- Opened: October 17, 1943; 82 years ago
- Rebuilt: 2010 (station house renovated)

Passengers
- 2025: 1,098,440 ▲3.6%

Services
Preceding station	Chicago "L"	Following station
Fullerton toward Howard	Red Line	Clark/Division toward 95th/Dan Ryan
Track layout
Location

North/Clybourn is an "L" station on the CTA's Red Line. It is a subway station with two side platforms, located at 1599 North Clybourn Avenue, in the Near North Side neighborhood of Chicago, at the southeastern edge of the commercial Clybourn Corridor. North/Clybourn station is located at the intersection of North Avenue, Halsted Street, and Clybourn Avenue. North/Clybourn opened on October 17, 1943, as part of the State Street subway.

== History ==
=== Apple advertising rights ===
On August 12, 2009, the Chicago Transit Board approved an ordinance granting Apple Inc. advertising rights to the station and the exclusive lease of the bus turnaround for nearly ten years in exchange for refurbishing and landscaping both. The project was to be completed by the end of 2010, and the amount paid by Apple to refurbish the station and bus turnaround was not to exceed $3.897 million.

== Bus connections ==
CTA

- 8 Halsted
- N9 Ashland Night Bus (Owl Service)
- 72 North

== Image gallery ==
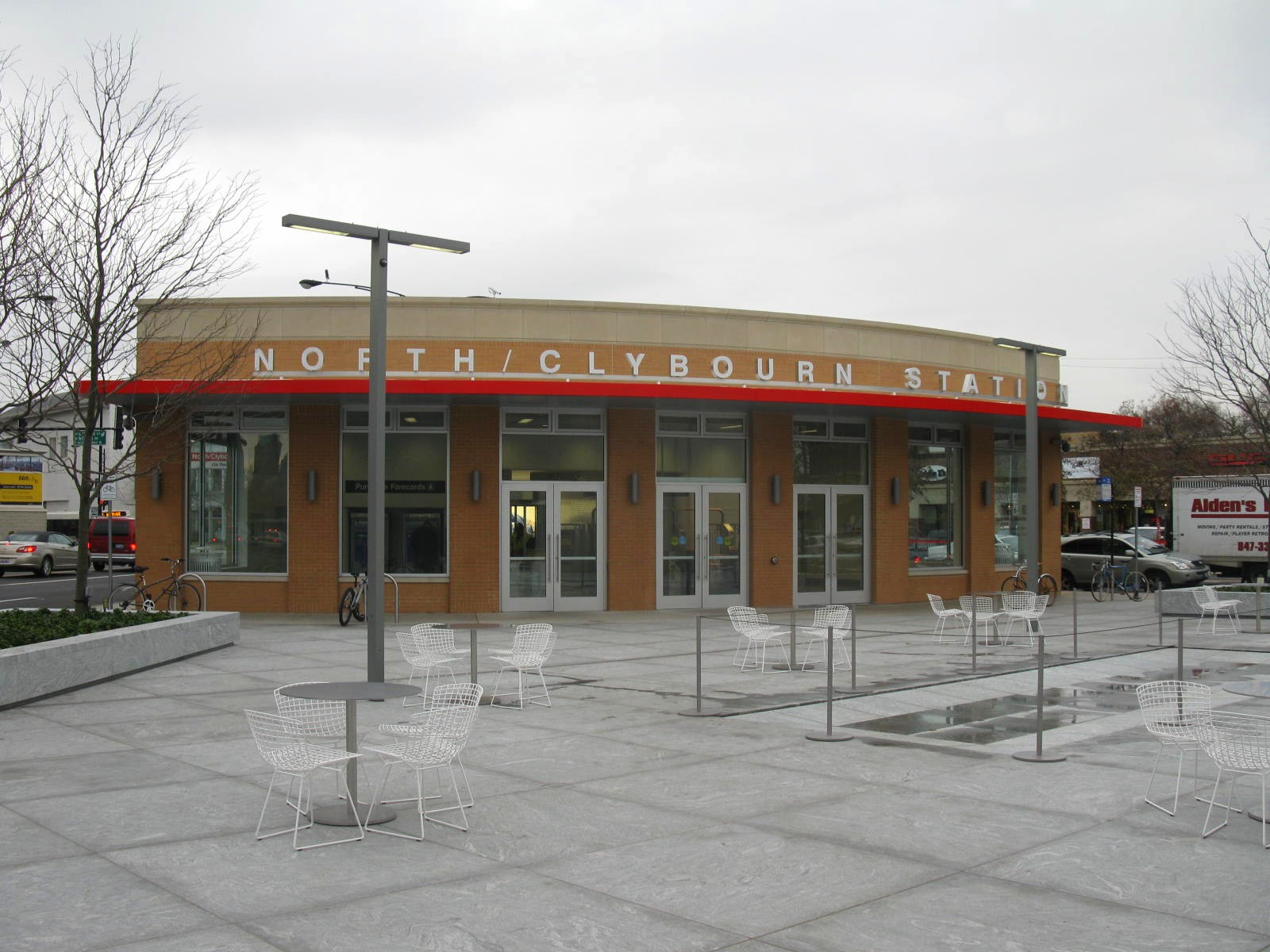
Station house during the day.

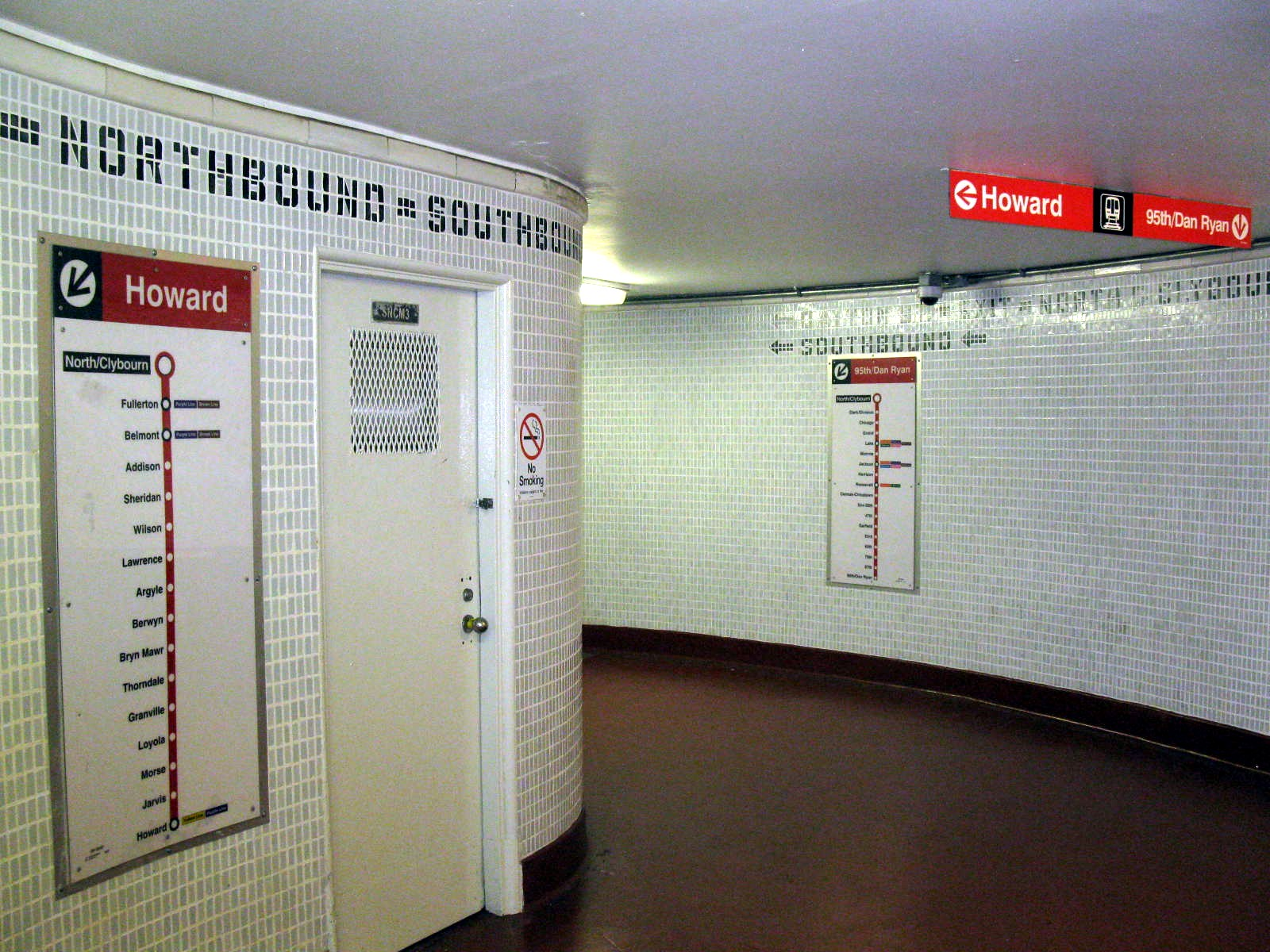
The white and black tiled-halls of North and Clybourn station.

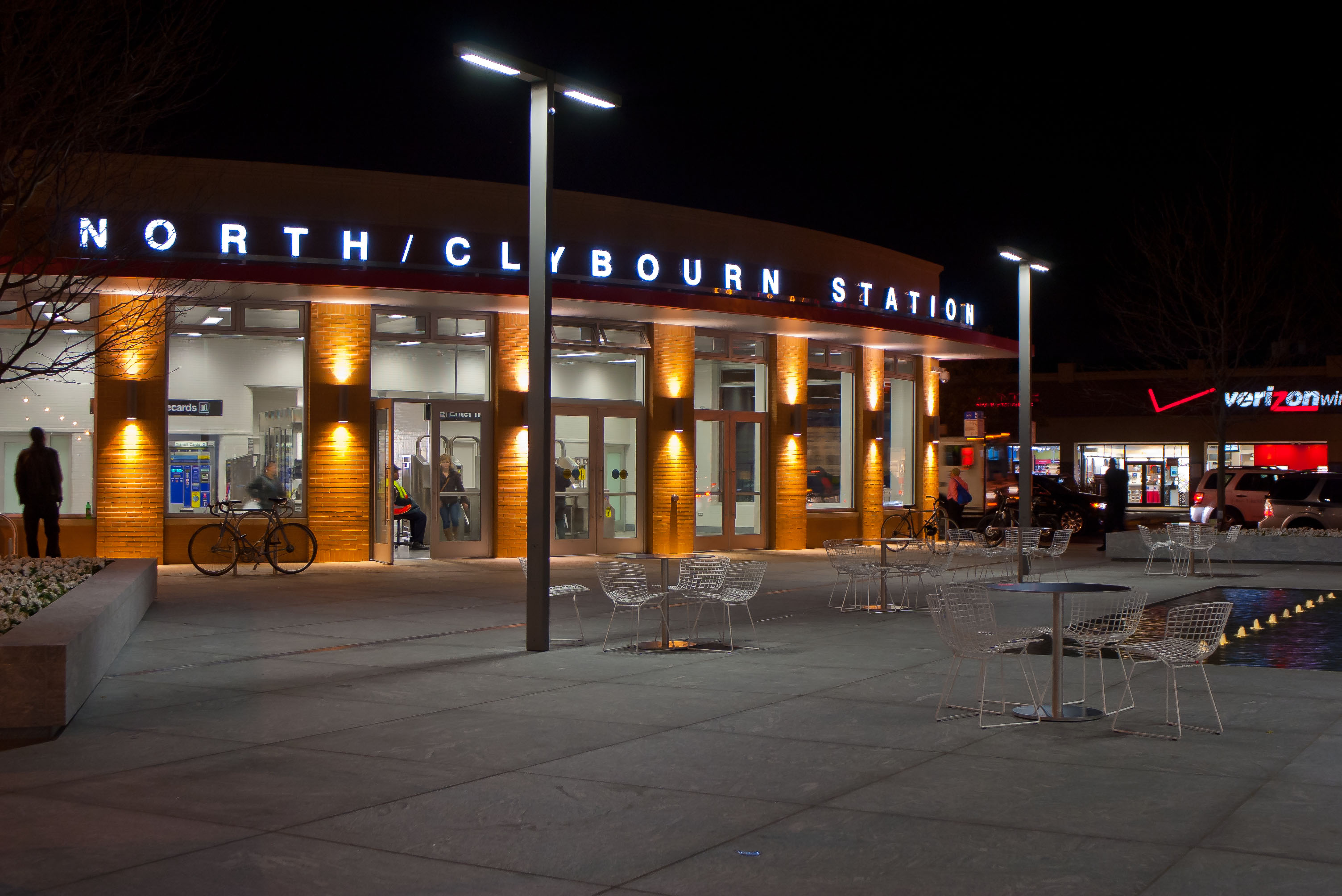
Station house at night.
