= Clark/Division station =

Chicago "L" station

Clark/Division 1200N 100W
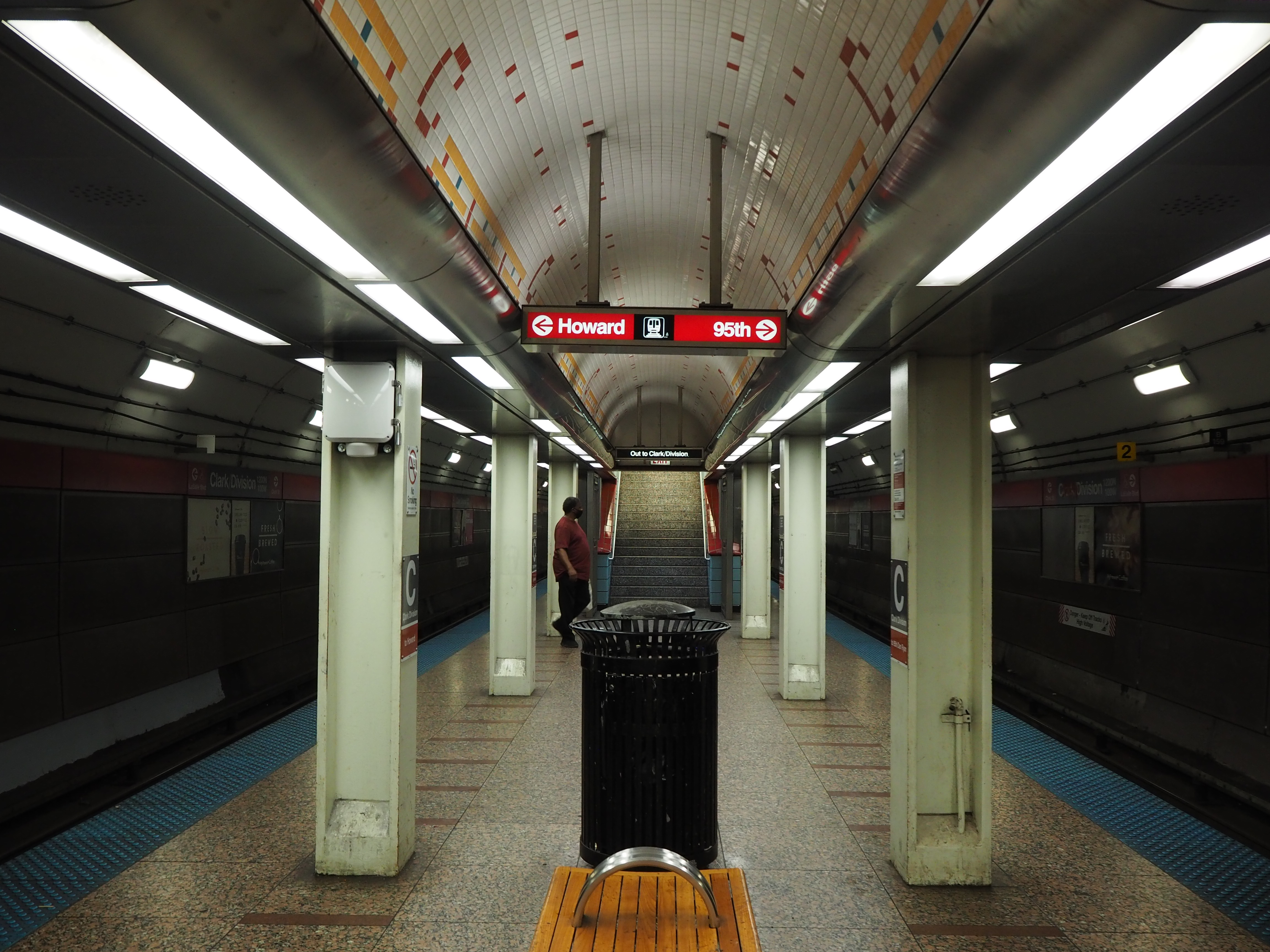

General information
- Location: 1200 North Clark Street; Chicago, Illinois 60610
- Coordinates: 41.90392°N 87.631412°W
- Owner: City of Chicago
- Line: State Street subway
- Platforms: 1 island platform
- Tracks: 2

Construction
- Structure type: Subway
- Depth: 26 ft (7.9 m)
- Cycle facilities: Yes
- Accessible: Yes

History
- Opened: October 17, 1943; 82 years ago
- Rebuilt: 2012–15 (station renovation)

Passengers
- 2025: 1,734,248 ▲6.8%

Services
Preceding station	Chicago "L"	Following station
North/Clybourn toward Howard	Red Line	Chicago toward 95th/Dan Ryan
Track layout
Location

Clark/Division is an "L" station on the CTA's Red Line. It is a subway station with one island platform located at 1200 North Clark Street, in the Near North Side neighborhood of Chicago, between the Gold Coast and Old Town. Much of Chicago's North Loop nightlife, including the Rush Street district and many bars and nightclubs are located close to the station.

== History ==
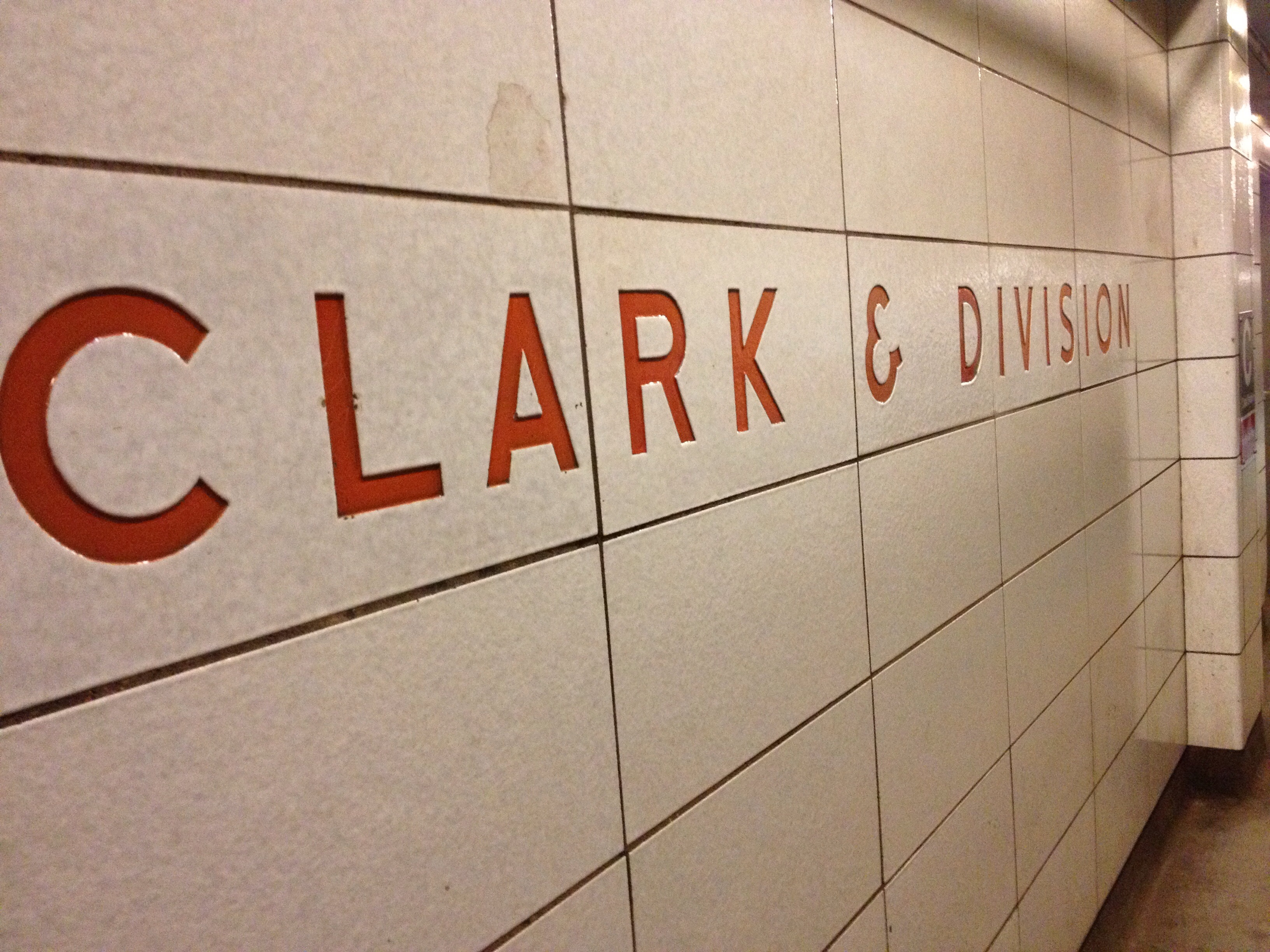

=== Structure ===
Clark/Division opened on October 17, 1943, as part of the State Street subway. From Clark/Division northbound trains travel west along Division Street, turning northwest at Clybourn Avenue to North/Clybourn station, a distance of about 1 1/4 miles (2.0 km) to the northwest. Southbound trains turn south to follow State Street to Chicago/State station, about 1/2 mile (0.80 km) to the south.

=== Platform ===
Clark/Division is the only station in the State Street subway north of the Loop to have an island platform; all of the other stations in the subway north of the Loop use side platforms.

=== Renovation ===
On September 10, 2012, a renovation project began at the station and ended on September 29, 2015. The renovation project made the station accessible to people with disabilities and provided new art features, bike racks, new signage, granite floors and stairs. The new LaSalle mezzanine and entrances opened at 5:00 a.m. on June 30, 2014. The station remained open during the project. The renovation has a projected cost of $50 million. The renovation of the Clark mezzanine and entrances was completed on September 29, 2015.

== Bus connections ==
CTA

- 22 Clark (Owl Service)
- 36 Broadway
- 70 Division
- 156 LaSalle

== In popular culture ==
Naomi Hirahara's 2021 mystery novel Clark and Division centers on the death of the narrator's sister, Rose Ito, from being struck by a train at the Clark/Division station.
