= List of killings by law enforcement officers in the United States in the 1980s =

This is a list of people reported killed by non-military law enforcement officers in the United States in the 1980s, whether in the line of duty or not, and regardless of reason or method. The listing documents the occurrence of a death, making no implications regarding wrongdoing or justification on the part of the person killed or officer involved. Killings are arranged by date of the incident that caused death. Different death dates, if known, are noted in the description. This page lists 152 people.

== 1980s ==
According to an article by the New York Times, 103 people were killed by the NYPD between 1984-1988.

The table below lists 152 people.

Date	Name (age) of deceased	State (city)	Description
1989-12-26	Larry Houchins Williams (42)	Virginia (Roanoke)	
1989-12-26	John James O'Connor (46)	Virginia (Wytheville)	
1989-12-24	Joe Canales (22)	Texas (Houston)	
1989-12-24	David Rivera (24)	New York (Bronx)	Police responding to a call of a violent man at an apartment building in Soundview discovered Rivera. He allegedly grabbed an officer's flashlight and struck the officer with it, causing that officer to shoot Rivera once, killing him.
1989-12-21	Unnamed, unarmed man	California (Alhambra)	
1989-12-17	Robert W. Turner (60)	Washington (Tacoma)	
1989-12-17	Ulysses Mahone (37)	Georgia (Woodbury)	
1989-12-14	Samuel Johnson (41)	Washington (Auburn)	
1989-12-04	Unnamed man	New York (Queens)	
1989-11-21	Timothy White (40)	New York (Manhattan)	
1989-11-15	Samuels, Haywood (44)	New York (Harlem)	
1989-11-15	Byron Gillum (24)	Texas (Houston)	
1989-11-15	Thia Yang (13)	Minnesota (Inver Grove Heights)	
1989-11-15	Basee Lor (13)	Minnesota (Inver Grove Heights)	
1989-11-01	Loise, Joseph (62)	New York (Queens)	
1989-10-31	Ida Lee Delaney (50)	Texas (Houston)	
1989-09-	Hughes, Henry (25)	New York (Bronx)	Hughes died after police used nightsticks and handcuffs to restrain him while he was under the influence of cocaine.
1989-08-19	Allen, Wayne (25)	New York (Bronx)	
1989-08-04	Neumann, Keith (24)	New York (Irvington)	Neumann, a police officer, was accidentally killed by the shotgun blast of another officer during a drug raid.
1989-06-23	Eban McDowell (23)	New York (Schoharie County)	
1989-05-31	Francis, Trevor (30)	New York (Harlem)	
1989-05	Luke, Richard	New York (Queens)	
1989-04-07	William Martinez (30)	California (Corcoran)	
1989-03-20	Larry Hill	Minnesota (Apply Valley)	
1989-01-28	John "Tony" Jackson (22)	New York (New York City)	
1989-01-23	Kelly, Stephen (61)	New York (Brooklyn)	
1989-01	Burnett, Marvin (34)	New York (Utica)	A robbery suspect, Burnett was shot and killed during an exchange of gunfire with Utica Police.
1988-12-30	Michael Fane	Nebraska (Omaha)	
1988-10-17	Charles Knowles (50)	Michigan (Detroit)	
1988-06-02	Angry Bear Nieto (27)	California (New Folsom)	
1988-05-29	Ronald Lee Fletcher (31)	Illinois (Oak Park)	An officer with a revolver attempted to arrest Fletcher, suspected of stealing a rental van. During the attempted arrest, Fletcher attempted to grab the gun, and it went off, striking him.
1988-04-27	Lydia Ferraro (32)	New York (Manhattan)	
1988-03-24	Willie Tillman (41)	New York (Queens)	
1988-03-07	Lee, Hong Pyo	California (Long Beach)	Lee was shot by several deputies, including future Los Angeles County Undersheriff Paul Tanaka, following a car chase. Deputies claimed Lee backed into a vehicle before he was shot.
1987-12-30	John Rogers (24)	Chicago, Illinois	Rogers was fatally shot by an unidentified Chicago Police officer shortly after shooting and killing Chicago Police Officer Lee Seward at an apartment building in the Buena Park neighborhood.
1987-12-29	Sanders Alfred (39)	New York (Queens)	Sanders was shot when he allegedly lunged a knife at officers. Officers fired 11 shots at him.
1987-07-08	Unnamed man	New York (Elmont)	
1987-04-20	Kevin Watson	Nebraska (Omaha)	
1986-12-13	Bruce, Jimmy Lee (20)	New York (Middletown)	
1986-11-27	Mark Watson (23)	New Jersey (Camden)	
1986-10-29	Arden Westcott	Nebraska (Omaha)	
1986-10-16	Roy Lynn Rhodes (27)	Texas (Houston)	
1986-10-16	Alice Marie Rhodes (23)	Texas (Houston)	
1986-09-16	Said Abu Ismaeil (elderly)	New York	
1986-09-16	Graham, John P.	Wisconsin (Sauk Prairie)	John P. Graham was shot by Sauk Prairie officer John Mueller. Graham was handcuffed. Mueller would be found guilty of first degree murder.
1986-08-24	Unnamed man	Washington DC	
1986-05-22	Joseph Michalski (22)	Nebraska (Omaha)	
1986-04-07	Maron Mataele (27)	Texas (Euless)	
1986-03-25	Vincent Cremata (52)	Florida (Winter Park)	
1986-02-24	Rasmussen, Sherri	California (Van Nuys)	Rasmussen was killed in her home by off-duty Los Angeles police officer Stephanie Lazarus, who had dated her husband before their marriage. Lazarus staged the killing to appear as if it were a burglary attempt Rasmussen had walked in on; the two scuffled slightly in the process. The case was indeed investigated initially as if it had been a burglary; Lazarus's DNA left behind in a bite on Rasmussen's body helped convict her when the case was reopened over 20 years later.
1986-01-28	Richard Ostot (25)	Florida (Pompano Beach)	
1986-01-14	Andrew Anthony (52)	Florida (Florida City)	
1985-12-31	Dennis Lucas (20)	Kentucky (Newport)	
1985-12-21	unidentified male	Florida (Tampa)	A man stabbed three people aboard a Hillsborough Area Regional Transit bus, fatally wounding a 14-year-old boy and injuring two others. The fatally wounded teenager ran to a local Harley Davidson shop and informed an off-duty Hillsborough County Sheriff's Office deputy of the situation before collapsing. The deputy discovered the suspect inside a hotel, where he had wounded two people, and ordered him to drop his knife. The suspect refused, saying "you'll have to kill me". The officer fired five shots in total, killing the suspect.
1985-09-02	Nathan Spackman (18)	Vermont (Brownsville)	
1985-07-12	Bennie Lee Young (24)	Texas (Houston)	
1985-06-12	Perry, Edmund	New York (Manhattan)	Perry, a returning, newly graduated honors student from Phillips Exeter Academy was shot to death by undercover NYPD detective Lee Van Houten whom Edmund tried to rob while in the company of his brother, Jonah. Both Van Houten and Jonah were acquitted of criminal wrongdoing.
1985-05-13	Africa, John	Pennsylvania (Philadelphia)	Africa and 10 others, including 5 children aged 7 to 13, were killed in the bombing of their rowhouse during an armed standoff with the Philadelphia police. The fire resulting from the bombs destroyed 65 homes and left 250 homeless. Gunfire was also flying as people tried to escape the fire. One of the two survivors maintains that police were shooting at the fleeing people, while the police stated that the people had been firing at police. A city investigative commission called the bombing "unconscionable" in their March 1986 report, but nobody from the city was criminally charged. In 1996, a federal jury awarded million civil judgment for excessive force and violation of 4th amendment protections.
1985-05-13	Africa, Rhonda	Pennsylvania (Philadelphia)	
1985-05-13	Africa, Theresa	Pennsylvania (Philadelphia)	
1985-05-13	Africa, Frank	Pennsylvania (Philadelphia)	
1985-05-13	Africa, Conrad	Pennsylvania (Philadelphia)	
1985-05-13	Africa, Tree	Pennsylvania (Philadelphia)	
1985-05-13	Africa, Delisha	Pennsylvania (Philadelphia)	
1985-05-13	Africa, Netta	Pennsylvania (Philadelphia)	
1985-05-13	Africa, Little Phil	Pennsylvania (Philadelphia)	
1985-05-13	Africa, Tomaso	Pennsylvania (Philadelphia)	
1985-05-13	Africa, Raymond	Pennsylvania (Philadelphia)	
1985-03-15	Sylvester Nava (20)	Texas (Houston)	
1985-01-08	Bradley Covany (31)	Philomath, Oregon	
1984-10-29	Bumpurs, Eleanor	New York (New York City)	Killing of Eleanor Bumpurs
1984-07-18	James O. Huberty (41)	California (San Ysidro)	Shot by police sniper after injuring 19 and killing 22 in the San Ysidro McDonald's massacre
1984-05-19	Silka, Michael	Alaska	
1984-05-04	Green, William	New Jersey (Newark)	William Bill Green was killed during a standoff with Hampton Va police officers after they were called to the residence for domestic violence. They found Green barricaded in his home. After many tense hours and the use of tear gas Green walked outside with his hands up at which time police officers opened fire striking Green over 89 times.He was pronounced dead at the scene.
1983-11-02	Phillip W. Franklin (22)	Texas (Houston)	
1983-09-30	Lorenzo Young (36)	Nebraska (Omaha)	
1983-09-28	Stewart, Michael	New York (New York City)	Death of Michael Stewart
1983-08-12	Jeffrey Robarge (20)	Vermont (Ferrisburg)	
1983-07-10	Unnamed man	New York (Manhattan)	
1983-05-23	Greg Bogener (26)	Nebraska (Omaha)	
1983-01-13	Sanders, Lindberg (49)	Tennessee (Memphis)	Shot and killed by police during a raid on a home where the group had allegedly been holding Patrolman R. S. Hester hostage for 30 hours. This incident is referred to as the "Shannon Street Massacre."
1983-01-13	Sanders, Larnell (26)	Tennessee (Memphis)	Shot and killed by police during a raid on a home where the group had allegedly been holding Patrolman R. S. Hester hostage for 30 hours. This incident is referred to as the "Shannon Street Massacre."
1983-01-13	Coleman, Michael Delane (18)	Tennessee (Memphis)	Shot and killed by police during a raid on a home where the group had allegedly been holding Patrolman R. S. Hester hostage for 30 hours. This incident is referred to as the "Shannon Street Massacre."
1983-01-13	Thomas, Earl (20)	Tennessee (Memphis)	Shot and killed by police during a raid on a home where the group had allegedly been holding Patrolman R. S. Hester hostage for 30 hours. This incident is referred to as the "Shannon Street Massacre."
1983-01-13	Houston, Andrew (JuJu) (18)	Tennessee (Memphis)	Shot and killed by police during a raid on a home where the group had allegedly been holding Patrolman R. S. Hester hostage for 30 hours. This incident is referred to as the "Shannon Street Massacre."
1983-01-13	Harris, Cassell	Tennessee (Memphis)	Shot and killed by police during a raid on a home where the group had allegedly been holding Patrolman R. S. Hester hostage for 30 hours. This incident is referred to as the "Shannon Street Massacre."
1983-01-13	unnamed male	Tennessee (Memphis)	Shot and killed by police during a raid on a home where the group had allegedly been holding Patrolman R. S. Hester hostage for 30 hours. This incident is referred to as the "Shannon Street Massacre."
1982-12-28	Johnson Jr., Nevelle	Florida (Overtown)	Overtown, Florida police officers, Luis Alvarez and Louis Cruz, were conducting a business check on an arcade. They then spotted a suspicious bulge in Johnson's waistband. Although what happened next is disputed, Alvarez held on to Johnson and his service revolver was fired, killing Johnson.
1982-12-19	Knut Surlien (23)	Utah (Salt Lake CIty)	
1982-12-18	Vernon Henry (29)	New York (Rochester)	
1982-11-19	Raymond Crawley (29)	Pennsylvania (Philadelphia)	
1982-10-31	Thomas Jones (22)	Oklahoma (Shawnee)	
1982-10-25	Charles Wettstein (40)	Arizona (Paradise Valley)	
1982-10-22	Danny Winstead (31)	North Carolina (Gurham)	
1982-10-05	Drumgoole, Willie Lee	California	Drumgoole, who was arrested on burglary charges, attempted to escape from a jail cell in Richmond as another inmate was being transferred to his cell. When he refused to follow orders to get back in the cell, he was placed in a chokehold and was sprayed with mace. A few minutes later, he had trouble breathing and died from a neck injury as a result of the chokehold.
1982-09-28	Jonathan Eugene Webb (20)	Oklahoma (Muskogee)	
1982-09-23	Ronald	Nebraska (Omaha)	
1982-08-31	Tyrone Dawson (13)	California (Long Beach)	
1982-08-30	Phil McLean (29)	North Carolina (Raleigh)	
1982-08-30	Raymond Shaar (40)	Arizona (Camp Verde)	
1982-08-14	Ingmar Stegis (25)	New Jersey (East Brunswick)	
1982-08-02	Unnamed man	New York (Brooklyn)	
1982-07-25	Richard Pascal (51)	California (Lancaster)	
1982-07-23	Bordonaro, Vincent (54)	Massachusetts (Chelsea)	Bordonaro was beaten by police officers during a brawl at King Arthur's Motel and Lounge, a strip club in Chelsea, Massachusetts, and died a week later due to head injuries. Officers John W. McLeod and Richard P. Aiello were found guilty of second-degree murder, while officer John T. Macauda was found guilty of manslaughter.
1982-07-18	Unnamed man (32)	Delaware (Dover)	
1982-07-11	Unnamed man	New York (Queens)	
1982-07-10	Donald Wayne Williams (23)	Texas (Houston)	
1982-07-04	Harry Lumpkin (32)	Florida (Alachua)	
1982-07-01	Unnamed man	California (Long Beach)	
1982-06-26	Theotis Sharpe (26)	Florida (Miami)	
1982-06-13	Anthony Ruggerio (24)	New York (New York)	
1982-06-12	Frank Pinkston (28)	Alabama (Montgomery)	
1982-06-12	John Howard Ray (32)	Tennessee (Chattanooga)	
1982-05-15	Roy Brabham	Florida (Pompano Beach)	
1982-05-11	Kenneth Jojola	New Mexico (Socorro)	
1982-05-06	John R. Quinn (21)	Virginia (Norfolk)	
1982-04-26	Kyle V. Martin (23)	Louisiana (Baton Rouge)	
1982-04-12	Frank Robinson (44)	Alabama (Montgomery)	
1982-04-10	Albert Smith (28)	Indiana (Indianapolis)	
1982-04-08	Floyd, Donald (44)	Missouri (Kansas City)	
1982-03-30	Samuel Lee Williams (28)	New Jersey (Elizabeth)	
1982-03-26	Darian Flamer (19)	New Jersey (Newark)	
1982-03-16	Unnamed man	Ohio (Columbus)	
1982-03-03	Unnamed man	Texas (Houston)	
1982-02-24	Unnamed boy (17)	Arkansas (Pocahontas)	
1982-02-16	Felix Toca (31)	Florida (Southwest Dade)	
1982-02-05	Jean Claude Goulet (40)	Tennessee (Memphis)	
1982-01-15	Robert Boarman (28)	Indiana (Lawrence)	
1982-01-14	Eugene Gonzales (36)	Utah (Salt Lake City)	
1982-01-03	Vaughn White (17)	Michigan (Detroit)	
1982-01-02	Stanley Bradley (25)	California (West Palm Beach)	
1981-12-31	Frank Melvin (26)	New Jersey (Newark)	
1981-11-14	Charles Mitchell (24)	Florida (Broward County)	
1981-10-20	James Rozmarin	Nebraska (Omaha)	
1981-10-12	Larry Nelson (27)	Nebraska (Omaha)	
1981-08-30	Rinaldo Hernandez (39)	Florida (Broward County)	
1981-08-28	Charles Young (33)	Florida (Broward County)	
1981-08-11	Grandstaff, James (31)	Texas (Borger)	After Borger police chased a fugitive's vehicle onto the ranch where Grandstaff, the foreman, lived with his family, he saw the situation and drove out to assist police. Officers fired at Grandstaff's truck from both sides, believing him to be the fugitive, killing him. His family successfully sued the city and the officers involved for gross negligence.
1981-06-12	Unnamed man	New York (Manhattan)	
1981-06-09	Unnamed man	Indiana (Indianapolis)	
1981-06-01	John Turner (28)	Florida (Broward County)	
1981-05-20	Walter Wolff (26)	Florida (Broward County)	
1981-05-01	Konrad Schagmuller (24)	Florida (Broward County)	
1981-04-17	Johnny Louis Chandler (23)	Florida (Broward County)	
1981-04-07	Michael Lee Lewis (33)	Florida (Broward County)	
1981-04-06	James Reuben "Tiny" Rolle (18)	Florida (Broward County)	
1981-04-03	Joseph Delange (26)	Florida (Broward County)	
1981-02-15	Joseph Wolanski (25)	New York (Brooklyn)	A woman called police and reported that her boyfriend was threatening her and her family. When they responded, Wolanski, who was on the fire escape, broke the kitchen window. One of the officers fired four shots, killing the unarmed Wolanski.
1981-01-29	Harold Lee Timmons (25)	Florida (Fort Lauderdale	
1980-12-22	Clarence Clark (46)	Vermont (Chester)	
1980-08-29	Brown, Dorothy	Mississippi (Jackson)	Officer Gary King shot Dorothy Brown, a pregnant Black woman, during a street disturbance, alleging that she had pointed a gun at him. Neighbors agreed that she had a gun but disputed that she had raised it or aimed it at anyone. The killing sparked protests in Jackson throughout the fall.
1980-05-26	Busha, Michelle (18)	Minnesota (Blue Earth)	While on duty, Minnesota state trooper Robert Leroy Nelson picked up a hitchhiker along Interstate 90. He raped, tortured and strangled the victim, whose body remained unidentified until March 2015. Nelson was convicted of first-degree manslaughter and is serving a life sentence in Texas for other crimes.

== See also ==
- Death in custody § United States
- Henry A. Wallace Police Crime Public Database
- List of cases of police brutality
- List of countries with annual rates and counts for killings by law enforcement officers
- List of law enforcement officers killed in the line of duty in the United States
- List of law enforcement officers convicted for an on-duty killing in the United States
- List of shootings by US immigration agents
- List of police reforms related to the George Floyd protests
- List of unarmed African Americans killed by law enforcement officers in the United States
- Lists of killings by law enforcement officers
- Police brutality in the United States
- Police misconduct § United States
- Police riot § United States
- Police use of deadly force in the United States
