= David H. Slade =

American scientist 1928-2012

David Slade
- Official Portrait, 1970s
- Born: David Hammer Slade; April 23, 1928; New York City, New York, U.S.
- Died: May 8, 2012 (aged 84); Silver Spring, Maryland, US
- Spouse: Florence Gerzog
- Children: 3
- Awards
- Scientific career
- Fields: meteorology, atomic physics

David Hammer Slade (April 23, 1928 - August 5, 2012) was an American scientist, environmentalist, and government official. After Jimmy Carter created the Department of Energy in 1977, Slade was hired to work for the Office of Health and Environmental Research and became director of the Carbon Dioxide Effects Research and Assessment Program (CDERA).

== Early life and career ==
David Hammer Slade was born on April 28, 1928 to Barbara (née Hammer) and Benjmain Slade, and was raised in Brooklyn, New York.

He worked at the Air Resources Laboratory with George Cressman where he contributed reports and studies to congress. Some of his work during this time includes his 1966 report Estimates of Dispersion from Pollutant Releases of a Few Seconds to 8 Hours in Duration and editing the book Meteorology and Atomic Energy (1968). In 1969, he released the report Wind Measurement on a Tall Tower in Rough and Inhomogeneous Terrain. Slade was one of the first government officials to direct funds toward research and studies of climate change in the United States.

Slade worked alongside leading scientific authorities of the time including Edward A. Frieman, Lester Machta. and Wallace Smith Broecker, among others. He was a key figure in the 1980 Climate Change Conference in St. Petersberg, Florida.

Slade continued to work in climate change research after Ronald Reagan was elected president and made significant budget cuts to the Department of Energy and defunded the CDERA program. His later work includes a 1989 poll of 21 leading scientists, of which 17 declared existence of proof of climate change.

== Personal life and death ==
Slade married Florence Gerzog (1934–2023), and had three children, a son, Benjamin, and two daughters, Fran and Susan. Slade was Jewish and a member of Shaare Tefila Congregation.

In the 2026 film A Statement, Slade is portrayed by Paul Giamatti. His work in climate change is also chronicled in the book Losing Earth by Nathaniel Rich.
