= Nathaniel Rich =

Nathaniel Rich may refer to:

- Nathaniel Rich (merchant adventurer) (1585–1636), English merchant adventurer
- Nathaniel Rich (novelist) (born 1980), American writer
- Nathaniel Rich (soldier) (died c. 1701), English New Model Army soldier
