= Defacement (The Death of Michael Stewart) =

1983 painting by Jean-Michel Basquiat

- The Death of Michael Stewart
- Artist: Jean-Michel Basquiat
- Year: 1983
- Medium: Acrylic and marker on wood
- Subject: Death of Michael Stewart
- Dimensions: 63.5 cm × 77.5 cm (25.0 in × 30.5 in)
- Owner: Collection of Nina Clemente

The Death of Michael Stewart, known as Defacement, is a painting created by American artist Jean-Michel Basquiat in 1983. The artwork is Basquiat's response to anti-Black racism and police brutality. It memorializes the death of Michael Stewart at the hands of New York City Transit Police for allegedly writing graffiti in the subway. No graffiti was found, according to Stewart's girlfriend at the time of his death.

== Background ==
Aspiring artist and model Michael Stewart was arrested by transit police for writing graffiti in the First Avenue station of the New York subway on September 15, 1983. He was brought to Bellevue Hospital hogtied and in critical condition. After thirteen days in a coma, Stewart died from his injuries on September 28, 1983. His death sparked outrage concerning police brutality. Basquiat was deeply affected by the story and said to friends that "it could have been me." He had started off as a street artist writing graffiti as SAMO. Basquiat was not close to Stewart, but they shared a circle of friends. At the time of his death, Stewart was dating Basquiat's former girlfriend, Suzanne Mallouk. Basquiat painted Defacement on the wall of artist Keith Haring's NoHo studio days after Stewart's death. Haring cut the artwork out of the drywall when he moved out in 1985. He had Sam Havadtoy add an ornate frame a year after Basquiat's death in 1989. It was hanging above Haring's bed at the time of his death in 1990.

== Analysis ==
Defacement depicts two pink-faced policemen in blue uniform, one with sharp, predator-like teeth, with batons clobbering a black silhouette. The word "¿DEFACEMENT©?" is written above them. The shadowy figure is Stewart, but it could also represent any black man who has been brutalized by the police. The tags of graffiti artists Daze and Zephyr are on the artwork.

While Stewart was still in a coma, artist David Wojnarowicz created a flyer for a rally protesting Stewart's then "near-murder" in Union Square on September 26, 1983. The flyer portrays the officers with skeletal faces beating a handcuffed black man with batons. It was taped all around downtown, which may have inspired Basquiat's Defacement painting.

In the years since Defacement was created, it has taken critical resonance with the Black Lives Matter movement.

== Exhibitions ==
Defacement was never sold and has seldom been displayed in public. It is owned by Nina Clemente, Keith Haring's goddaughter and daughter of the Italian painter Francesco Clement.

In 2016, Chaédria LaBouvier, an independent curator, partnered with her alma mater Williams College Museum of Art in Massachusetts to bring the painting to the campus. It hung in the Reading Room, which is part of the college's first library. In 2019, LaBouvier organized Basquiat's 'Defacement': The Untold Story at the Guggenheim Museum in New York. The exhibit centered around the painting and the reaction of the downtown community to the death of Michael Stewart. Artwork by Stewart was displayed for the first time.

== See also ==
- List of paintings by Jean-Michel Basquiat
- 1983 in art
