= A Statement =

2026 American drama film

- Directed by: Tom McCarthy
- Screenplay by: Tom McCarthy; Thomas Bidegain; Noé Debré
- Based on: Losing Earth by Nathaniel Rich
- Produced by: Jonathan King; David Levine; Jim Whitaker; Tom McCarthy; Jonathan Schwartz; Nick Shumaker; Bard Dorros; Mary Aloe
- Starring: Paul Rudd; Evan Peters; Amy Ryan; Paul Giamatti; John Turturro; Tatiana Maslany; Jason Clarke; Nina Arianda; Michael Chernus; Noah Robbins; Zach Woods; Alan Aisenberg; Dylan Baker
- Cinematography: Stuart Dryburgh
- Edited by: Jane Rizzo
- Music by: Bryce Dessner
- Production companies: Sony Pictures Classics; Anonymous Content; Concordia Studio; Artists Equity; Slow Pony; Aloe Entertainment; Jigsaw Productions; Hammerstone Studios; Galisteo Media; Andrew Lauren Productions
- Distributed by: Sony Pictures Releasing
- Release date: October 3, 2026 (NYFF)
- Running time: 111 minutes
- Country: United States
- Language: English

A Statement is a 2026 American biographical comedy drama film directed by Tom McCarthy, co-written with Thomas Bidegain and Noé Debré, and based on the 2019 non-fiction book Losing Earth by Nathaniel Rich.

The film centers on a historic conference that took place from October 30–31, 1980 at the Don CeSar Hotel in St. Petersburg, Florida, also known as the "Pink Palace" conference. The event took place just days before the 1980 United States presidential election on November 4, 1980, when Democratic President Jimmy Carter lost his re-election to Ronald Reagan. At the conference, a group of scientists and environmentalists gather to debate evidence of climate change, with the conference to conclude in a joint statement to Congress about their findings and what preventative measures should be taken.

It stars an ensemble cast including Paul Rudd, Evan Peters, Amy Ryan, Paul Giamatti, John Turturro, Dylan Baker, Tatiana Maslany, Jason Clarke, Nina Arianda and Zach Woods.

The film premiered in the Spotlight Gala section of the 2026 New York Film Festival on October 3, and will be released theatrically in the United States by Sony Pictures Classics in late 2026.

== Premise ==
In 1980, in the final months of the Jimmy Carter presidency, a group of scientists, activists and policymakers gather in Florida for a conference on the effects of carbon dioxide emissions on the climate with a seemingly simple mandate: writing a statement for Congress on measures to be taken against the issue.

== Cast ==
- Paul Rudd as Thomas Jorling, assistant administrator of the Environmental Protection Agency
- Evan Peters as Rafe Pomerance, an environmental lobbyist
- Amy Ryan as Annemarie Crocetti, a public health scholar
- Paul Giamatti as David H. Slade, the director of the Department of Energy's Carbon Dioxide and Climate Research program
- John Turturro as David J. Rose, a nuclear engineer
- Tatiana Maslany as Edith Brown Weiss, an environmental lawyer
- Jason Clarke as John Perry, a meteorologist
- Nina Arianda as Bernadette, a stenographer working to transcribe the convention
- Michael Chernus as Tom McPherson, politician
- Noah Robbins as Robert Cunningham, a scientist
- Zach Woods as Anthony Scoville, a technical consultant to the Subcommittee on Science, Research, and Technology
- Alan Aisenberg as Mitch Tyson, clean engergy executive
- Dylan Baker as George M. Woodwell, an ecologist
- Michael Cerveris as Edward Strohbehn, a scientist and environmental lawyer who worked as executive director of the Council on Environmental Quality under President Jimmy Carter
- Mary Catherine Garrison as Jeanne Malchon, a politician
- Bryan Batt as Thomas Waltz, an economist
- Christopher Denham as David Burns, director with The American Association for the Advancement of Science (AAAS)
- Zak Orth as Dean Abrahamson, policy professor at Minnesota's Humphrey School of Public Affairs
- Billy Slaughter as John Hoffman, creator of the Energy Star program
- Jim Klock as William Elliott, an atmospheric scientist
- Joey Slotnick as John Laurmann, a Stanford University scientist
- Aaron Jay Rome as William Sommers, a meteorologist and research director for the USDA Forest Service
- Eli Bildner as Henry Shaw, a scientist working for Exxon Research & Engineering (ER&E)
- Raegan Jolie Rozas as Tiffany, the bride
- Adrian Martinez as Ed, father of the bride
- Bryan Fletcher as "The Waiter" (screen debut)

== Production ==
=== Development ===
In January 2026, it was announced that Sony Pictures Classics would co-finance and distribute Tom McCarthy's next directorial effort – which he also co-adapted with Thomas Bidegain and Noé Debré from the 2019 book Losing Earth. In an interview with McCarthy at the New York Film Festival, it was revealed that the script was crafted from the original transcript from the conference, that Nathaniel Rich was able to procure from the National Archives. The actors perform the transcript in large parts verbatim, with McCarthy likening the text as Shakesperian in nature.

Filming was set to commence in late February 2026. That same month, the film's title was reported to be The Statement, with Paul Rudd, Paul Giamatti, and Peter Sarsgaard rumored to star. In February 2026, the cast was revealed to consist of Rudd, Giamatti, Evan Peters, Tatiana Maslany, John Turturro, Amy Ryan, and Jason Clarke. Production on the film was delayed to March. In April 2026, the rest of the cast was announced.

=== Filming ===
Principal photography began in New Orleans, Louisiana, initially for interior scenes for several weeks in March 2026. Filming shifted to St. Petersburg, Florida and St. Pete Beach, Florida for exterior scenes in early April 2026.
