= Noordwijk Climate Conference =

Political climate conference in 1989 at Noordwijk, The Netherlands

Ministerial Conference on Atmospheric Pollution and Climate Change
- Venue: Grand Hotel Huis ter Duin
- Theme: Climate change and atmospheric pollution

The Ministerial Conference on Atmospheric Pollution and Climate Change was the first major political climate conference that took place on 6 and 7 November 1989 at the Grand Hotel Huis ter Duin in Noordwijk, The Netherlands.

Attendees included ministers of 68 countries. The goal of the conference was creating a binding agreement on carbon dioxide emissions, which almost succeeded. The conference was organized by the Dutch environment minister Ed Nijpels and prepared by climatologist Pier Vellinga.

The United States, Japan, the Soviet Union and the United Kingdom did not want to make an agreement about the reduction of emissions. Even discussions about stabilizing emissions turned out to be difficult. The conference did not reach its initial goals.

The United States sent the Administrator of the Environmental Protection Agency William K. Reilly and White House Chief of Staff John H. Sununu. According to Reilly, Sununu was nervous about him. Sununu made the science advisor to president George H. W. Bush, D. Allan Bromley, responsible. The science advisor was pressured by the climate sceptical Sununu to convince the other attendees to abandon the commitment to freeze emissions.

In 2019, the conference attracted interest due to a publication in New York Times Magazine by Nathaniel Rich, who subsequently wrote the book Losing Earth as an extension of the article. According to Rich, this conference was the closest the world has ever been to a binding international agreement regarding greenhouse gas emissions.
