= Greg Nobile =

American Broadway theatre producer

- Nobile in 2026
- Born: United States
- Occupation: Producer
- Known for: The Gentleman's Guide to Love and Murder

Greg Nobile is an American Broadway theatre producer and CEO of Seaview Productions.

== Life and career ==
Nobile graduated Branford High School where he was active in theatre and had lead roles in a number of school productions. He later studied arts administration at Marymount Manhattan College for a single semester before dropping out to take a chance on Broadway. Nobile began his producing career at age 20 when he raised financing for the musical The Gentleman's Guide to Love and Murder which went on to win the Tony Award for Best Musical.

Nobile has produced such shows as Hughie, Gypsy, Slave Play, Ratatouille: The TikTok Musical, Danny and the Deep Blue Sea, Sweeney Todd, All In: Comedy About Love, Once Upon a Mattress and Good Night, and Good Luck with George Clooney.

In 2025, Nobile and Seaview Productions took over the New York City based Tony Kiser Theatre and renamed it Studio Seaview with plans of staging future theatrical productions.
