= Annemarie Crocetti =

American public health scholar

- Born: Annemarie Fiebes; April 26, 1920; Düsseldorf, Germany
- Died: July 23, 1996 (aged 76); New York City, NY.
- Education: Johns Hopkins University (Dr.P.H.)
- Known for: Public health research
- Spouse: Guido Crocetti
- Children: 1

Annemarie Fiebes Crocetti (April 26, 1920 - July 23, 1996) was a German-born American epidemiologist, researcher, educator, and environmental activist.

== Life and career ==
Crocetti was born in Dusseldorf, Germany, the daughter of Emilia (née Beerman) and Henry Fiebes. Her family immigrated to the United States and settled in New Jersey. She earned her Doctor of Public Health from Johns Hopkins University. In the 1950s, she worked with the National Opinion Research Center. In 1961, she conducted a study concerning the frequency of open heart surgeries in the United States for the American Heart Association.

Crocetti attended the historic 1980 convention of climate change activists at the Don CeSar Hotel in St. Petersberg, Florida as an appointed member of Jimmy Carter's National Council on Air Pollution, a position she began in 1978. At the time of her appointment, she was a professor of preventitive medicine at New York Medical College. In the late 1980s, Crocetti continued to serve as a consultant for the Environmental Protection Agency.

During her later time at the EPA, she focused on research concerning lead poisoning in water supplies. Along with her co-author Dr. Paul Mushak, she submitted to congress their findings on toxicology in public water supplies in 1987. She led a protest against the Reagan Administration for "watering down" their reports findings, which concluded that 2.4 million urban preschool children have developmental problems associated with lead levels.

Crocetti was a key figure in the death of Michael Stewart 1983 murder case. She testified that she witnessed police abusing Stewart from her Union Square apartment.

Her later work focused on research of cancers related to exposure to arsenic, and cancer risks caused by lead exposure in radiation.

== Personal life ==
She married Guido Crocetti, with whom she had one son, Gino. Her husband was a sociologist, professor, and author of the 1974 book Contemporary Attitudes Toward Mental Illness.

In the 2026 Tom McCarthy film A Statement, Crocetti is portrayed by Amy Ryan.

== Select works ==
- 1988: Nature and extent of lead poisoning in children in the United States: a report to Congress
- 1989: Prenatal and postnatal effects of low-level lead exposure: Integrated summary of a report to the U.S. congress
- 1990: Determination of numbers of lead-exposed American children as a function of lead source: Integrated summary of a report to the U.S. Congress
- 1990: Methods for reducing lead exposure in young children and other risk groups: an integrated summary of a report to the U.S. Congress
- 1990: Determination of Numbers of Lead-Exposed U.S. Children by Areas of the United States: An Integrated Summary of a Report to the U.S. Congress
- 1993: Bone lead content assessed by L-line x-ray fluorescence in lead-exposed and non-lead-exposed suburban populations in the United States.
- 1995: Risk and revisionism in arsenic cancer risk assessment.
- 1996: Lead and Nutrition: I: Biologic Interactions of Lead with Nutrients
- 1996: Lead and Nutrition: Part II: Some Potential Impacts of Lead-Nutrient Interactions i n US Populations at Risk
