= Frank Rich =

American essayist and liberal columnist (born 1949)

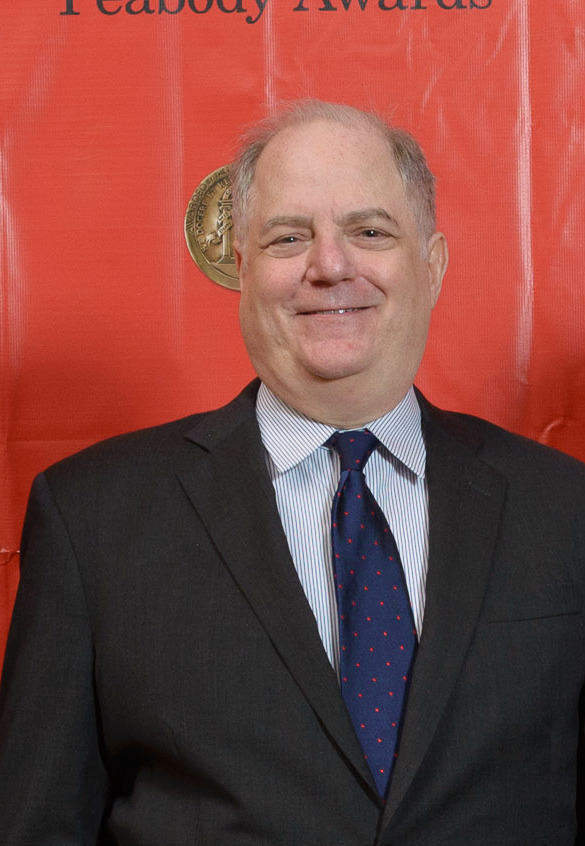
- Rich in 2004
- Born: Frank Hart Rich Jr. June 2, 1949 (age 77); Washington, D.C., U.S.
- Education: Harvard University (BA)
- Occupations: Writer; television producer
- Spouses: Gail Winston (m. 1976; div. 1987); Alex Witchel (m. 1991)
- Children: Nathaniel; Simon
- Writing career
- Period: 1971–present
- Genre: Non-fiction

Frank Hart Rich Jr. (born June 2, 1949) is an American essayist and liberal op-ed columnist, who held various positions within The New York Times from 1980 to 2011. He has also produced television series and documentaries for HBO.

Rich is currently writer-at-large for New York magazine, where he writes essays on politics and culture and engages in regular dialogues on news of the week for the "Daily Intelligencer". He served as executive producer of the long-running HBO comedy series Veep, having joined the show at its outset in 2011, and of the HBO drama series Succession.

== Early life and education ==
Born on June 2, 1949, Rich grew up in Washington, D.C. His mother, Helene Fisher (née Aaronson), a schoolteacher and artist, was from a Russian Jewish family that originally settled in Brooklyn, New York City, but moved to Washington, D.C., following the stock market crash of 1929. His father, Frank Hart Rich, a businessman, was from a German Jewish family long-settled in Washington. He attended public schools and graduated from Woodrow Wilson High School in 1967.

Rich attended Harvard College in Cambridge, Massachusetts. At Harvard, he was editorial chairman of The Harvard Crimson, the university's daily student newspaper. Rich was an honorary Harvard College scholar and a member of Phi Beta Kappa, and received a Henry Russell Shaw Traveling Fellowship. He graduated magna cum laude in 1971 with a Bachelor of Arts degree in American history and literature.

== Career ==
Before joining The New York Times in 1980, Rich was a film and television critic for Time, a film critic for The New York Post, and film critic and senior editor of New Times Magazine. In the early 1970s, he was a founding editor of the Richmond (Va.) Mercury.

=== Theater criticism ===
Rich served as chief theater critic of The New York Times from 1980 to 1993, earning the nickname "Butcher of Broadway" for the perceived power of his negative reviews to close Broadway shows. He claimed that the actor Rowan Atkinson first used the nickname after Rich had panned a revue Atkinson brought to New York from London. He first won attention from theater-goers with an essay for The Harvard Crimson about the Broadway musical Follies (1971), by Stephen Sondheim, during its pre-Broadway tryout run in Boston. In his study of the work, Rich was "the first person to predict the legendary status the show eventually would achieve". The article "fascinated" Harold Prince, the musical's co-director, and "absolutely intrigued" Sondheim, who invited the undergraduate to lunch to further discuss his feelings about the production.

External videos
- Presentation by Rich on Hot Seat, September 1, 1998, C-SPAN

In a retrospective article for The New York Times Magazine, "Exit the Critic," published in 1994, Rich reflected on the controversies during his tenure as drama critic as well as on the playwrights he championed and on the tragedies that decimated the New York theater during the height of the AIDS crisis. A collection of Rich's theater reviews was published in a book, Hot Seat: Theater Criticism for The New York Times, 1980–1993 (1998). He also wrote The Theatre Art of Boris Aronson, with Lisa Aronson, in 1987.

=== Media and political criticism ===
From 1994 to 2011, Rich was an op-ed columnist for The New York Times; he wrote regularly on the connections between mass media and American politics. His columns, now appearing in New York Magazine, make regular references to a broad range of popular culture—including television, movies, theater and literature. In addition to his long-time work for the Times and New York, Rich has written for many other publications, including The New York Review of Books and The New Republic.

The commentator Bill O'Reilly, host of the Fox News Channel talk show The O'Reilly Factor, criticized Rich following Rich's criticism of Fox in 2004 as having a politically conservative bias.

Rich dismissed the epic biblical drama film The Passion of the Christ (2004), directed by Mel Gibson, as "nothing so much as a porn movie, replete with slo-mo climaxes and pounding music for the money shots."

External videos
- Presentation by Rich on The Greatest Story Ever Sold, December 4, 2006, C-SPAN

In a January 2006 appearance on The Oprah Winfrey Show, commenting on the James Frey memoir scandal, Rich expanded on his usage in his column of the term truthiness to summarize a variety of ills in culture and politics. His book, The Greatest Story Ever Sold: The Decline and Fall of Truth from 9/11 to Katrina (2006), criticized the American media for what he perceived as its support of George W. Bush's administration's propaganda following the September 11, 2001 terrorist attacks and during the run-up to the Iraq war.

A July 2009 column focused on what Rich believes is the bigoted nature of President Barack Obama's detractors. On the Tea Party movement, which emerged in 2009, Rich opined that at one of their rallies they were "kowtowing to secessionists." He wrote that death threats and a brick thrown through a congressman's window were a "small-scale mimicry of "Kristallnacht" (or "night of broken glass", the November 1938 anti-Jewish pogrom in Nazi Germany and Austria). In his essays at New York, Rich has continued to examine the American right, including its latest revival during the candidacy and presidency of Donald Trump.

== Television ==
Since 2008, Rich has been a creative consultant for HBO, where he has helped initiate and develop new programming and was an executive producer of Veep, the long-running comedy series created by Armando Iannucci and starring Julia Louis-Dreyfus. He was also an executive producer of Succession, the HBO drama series created by Jesse Armstrong that debuted in June 2018 to critical praise.

Rich was also an executive producer for the HBO documentaries Six by Sondheim (2013), directed by James Lapine, and Becoming Mike Nichols (2016), directed by Douglas McGrath.

== Awards ==
Rich's journalistic honors include the George Polk Award for commentary in 2005 and, in 2011, the Goldsmith Career Award for Excellence in Journalism from Harvard University (also his alma mater). In 2011, Rich was awarded an honorary doctorate from The New School. In 2016, he received the Mirror Award for Best Commentary from the Newhouse School at Syracuse University. He was inducted into the Theater Hall of Fame in 2014.

Rich was twice a Pulitzer Prize finalist, in 1987 and 2005. In 2010, he was awarded the Lifetime Achievement Award from the Silurians Press Club.

Rich received Emmy Awards in 2015, 2016, and 2017 for Veep, which was named Outstanding Comedy Series, and in 2020 for Succession, which was named Outstanding Drama Series. He also received a Golden Globe in 2020 for Succession, which won the Best Drama Series prize. He has won three Peabody Awards: for Succession in 2020, for Veep in 2017, and, in 2013, for Six by Sondheim, which was also honored with the ASCAP Deems Taylor Television Broadcast Award.

== Criticism ==
In 2011, The New Republic included him along with Rachel Maddow, Newt Gingrich, Paul Ryan, etc. in an editorial roundup of the "Most Over-Rated Thinkers" of the year, calling him "an utterly conventional pundit of the old salon liberal variety".

== Personal life ==
Rich lives in Manhattan with his wife, Alex Witchel, an author and journalist; they married in 1991. He has two sons from his previous marriage to Gail Winston: Simon Rich, a novelist and short story writer who created the television series Man Seeking Woman and was a writer for Saturday Night Live, and Nathaniel Rich, who is a novelist, journalist, and essayist.

== Memoir ==
External videos
- Booknotes interview with Rich on Ghost Light: A Memoir, December 10, 2000, C-SPAN

Frank Rich's memoir Ghost Light (2000) chronicles his childhood in the late 1950s and 1960s in Washington, D.C., with a focus on his lifelong adoration of the theater and the impact it had on his life.

== Bibliography ==
- Rich, Frank; Aronson, Lisa (1987). The Theatre Art of Boris Aronson. New York: Knopf. ISBN 0-394-52913-8.
- Rich, Frank (1998). Hot Seat — Theater Criticism for The New York Times, 1980–1993. New York: Random House. ISBN 0-679-45300-8.
- Rich, Frank (2000). Ghost Light — A Memoir. New York: Random House. ISBN 0-375-75824-0.
- Rich, Frank (2006). The Greatest Story Ever Sold — The Decline and Fall of Truth from 9/11 to Katrina. New York: Penguin Press. ISBN 1-59420-098-X.
