= The Truth About Lies =

- Film poster
- Directed by: Phil Allocco
- Written by: Phil Allocco
- Produced by: Phil Allocco; Colleen Camp; Steve Carr; Kim Jackson; Isen Robbins; Aimee Schoof; Jason Taragan; Tim Degraye
- Starring: Odette Annable; Mary Elizabeth Ellis; Chris Diamantopoulos; Colleen Camp; Fran Kranz
- Cinematography: Peter Mariuzza
- Edited by: Nick Carew; Éva Gárdos
- Music by: Adam Horovitz
- Production company: Rumpus Entertainment
- Release date: January 2015 (Santa Barbara)
- Running time: 94 minutes
- Country: United States
- Language: English

The Truth About Lies is an American romantic comedy film directed, produced and written by Phil Allocco and stars Fran Kranz, Odette Annable, Mary Elizabeth Ellis and Chris Diamantopoulos.

== Plot ==
Gilby Smalls (Fran Kranz) is an aimless guy who is having a meltdown. He's just been fired from his job, lost his apartment in a fire and he's forced to move in with his booze-swindling, man-obsessed mother. Life is bleak and as he's desperate to turn things around when he meets his friend's beautiful sister, who appears to be everything he ever wanted. Desperate to impress her, Gilby weaves a web of lies, each one bigger than the last, until he finds himself in too deep when the truth proves to be too much to admit.

== Cast ==
- Odette Annable as Rachel Stone
- Mary Elizabeth Ellis as Sharon
- Chris Diamantopoulos as Eric Stone
- Colleen Camp as May
- Fran Kranz as Gilby Smalls
- Laura Kightlinger as Ms. Harris
- Miles Fisher as Kevin
- Arthur J. Nascarella as James Lance
- Jonathan Katz as Dr. Pollard
- Daniel Raymont as Broken Wings
- Angela Pietropinto as Aunty
- Adam David Thompson as Andy
- Carson Elrod as Jack
- Jonathan Blitt as Fred Goldstein
- Victor Truro as Micky
- Gemma Forbes as Ann
- Nancy McDoniel as Rhea
- Katy Grenfell as Jenny
- Zebedee Row as Calvin
- Michael Guagno as Brad
- Oakes Fegley as Boy
- Mohammed Ali as bicyclist – stunt

== Production ==
Filming took place in areas near Chappaqua, New York during November 2012 and began in New York City in December 2012.

== Release ==
The film debuted at the 2015 Santa Barbara International Film Festival.

== Awards ==
- BEST ROMANCE at the International Film Festival—Screenplay Competition (2010)
- FINALIST at the Beverly Hills Film Festival—Screenplay Competition (2011)
