= Simon Rich =

American humorist and writer (born 1984)

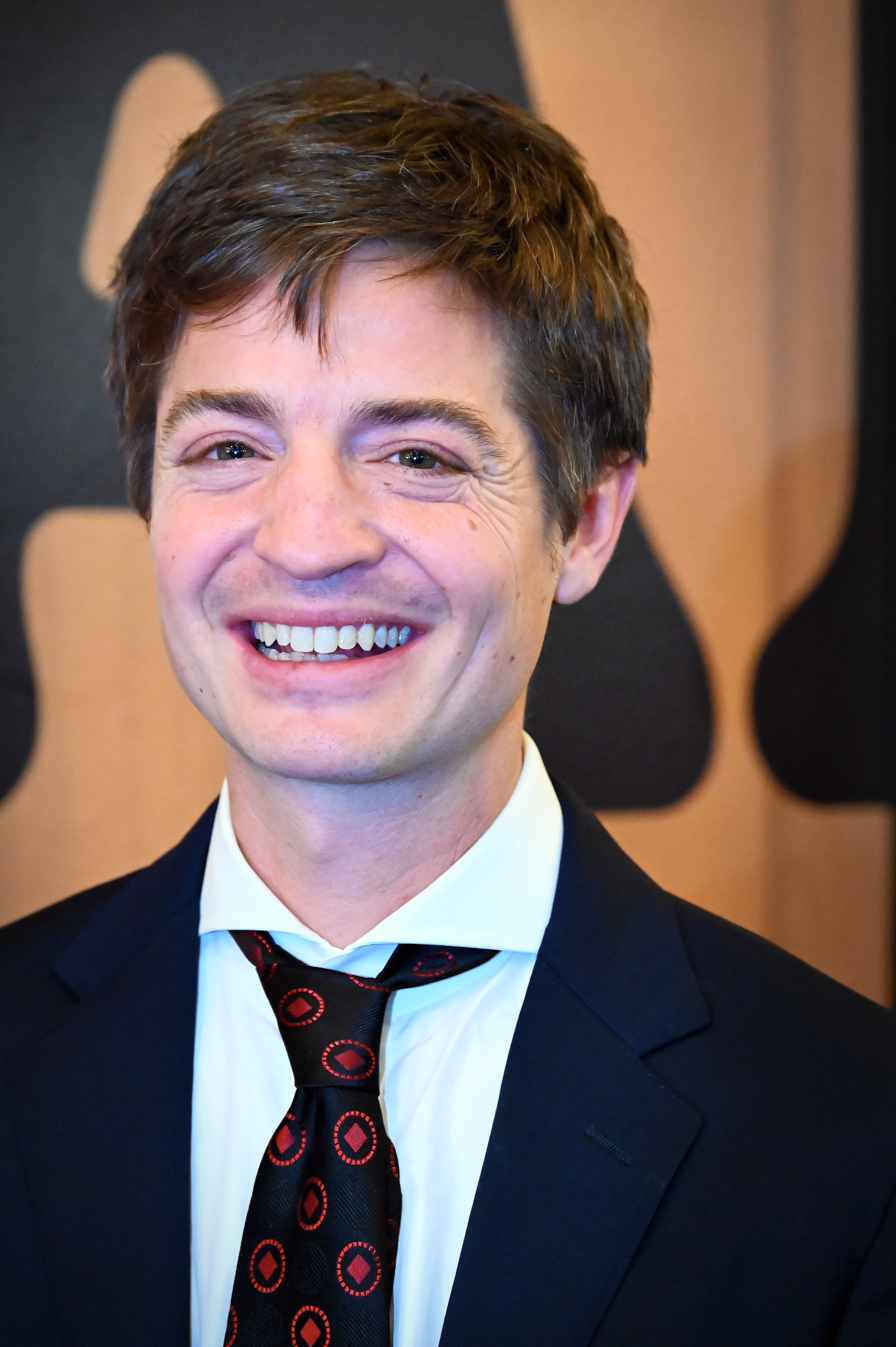
- Rich in 2025
- Born: June 5, 1984 (age 42); New York City, New York, U.S.
- Education: Harvard University
- Occupations: Author; screenwriter
- Spouse: Kathleen Hale (m. 2015)
- Children: 2
- Parent: Frank Rich
- Relatives: Nathaniel Rich (brother)
- Writing career
- Years active: 2007–present

Simon Rich (born June 5, 1984) is an American humorist, novelist, and screenwriter. He has published two novels and six collections of humor pieces, several of which appeared in The New Yorker. His novels and short stories have been translated into more than a dozen languages.

Rich was one of the youngest writers ever hired on Saturday Night Live, and served as a staff writer for Pixar. On January 14, 2015, Man Seeking Woman, a television comedy series created by Rich (and based on his short story collection The Last Girlfriend on Earth), premiered on the cable channel FXX.

== Early life and education ==
Rich was born and raised in New York City. His family is Jewish. His father is columnist Frank Rich; his mother, Gail Winston, is also a writer. His older brother is novelist Nathaniel Rich. His step-mother, Alex Witchel, is a reporter for The New York Times.

Rich attended the Town School and the Dalton School. After graduating, he enrolled at Harvard University, where he became president of the Harvard Lampoon. He was classmates with Facebook founder Mark Zuckerberg.

== Career ==
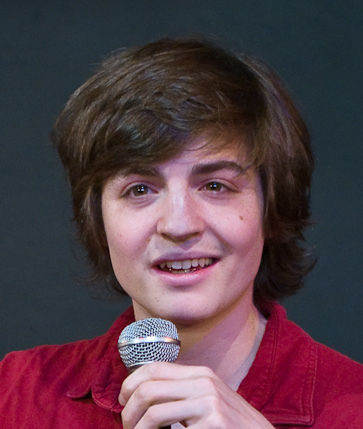
Rich in 2009

After graduating from Harvard, Rich wrote for Saturday Night Live for four years (2007–2011). The staff was nominated for the Emmy Award for Outstanding Writing in a Variety, Music or Comedy Series in 2008, 2009, and 2010 and won the Writers Guild of America Award for Comedy/Variety Series in 2009 and 2010.

Rich departed to work as a staff writer for Pixar.

In 2013 and 2014, he was named to Forbes' 30 Under 30 list.

=== Magazine work ===
Rich has had pieces published in McSweeney's, The Believer, GQ, The Observer magazine, Mad magazine, Vanity Fair, UK Glamour, Italian GQ, Italian Granta, NPR.com, NPR's "Selected Shorts," and The Barcelona Review, among other publications.

His writing has also been selected for numerous anthologies including The Best of McSweeney's, and I Found This Funny, edited by Judd Apatow.

In 2013, Sony Pictures acquired the film rights to Rich's four-part novella Sell Out, which was originally published by The New Yorker that same year.

=== Film work ===
Rich wrote the screenplay for the film An American Pickle, which premiered in 2020. Seth Rogen starred in the dual lead roles and served as producer.

=== Undeveloped projects ===
Rich was slated to write the script based on the illustrated book Unicorn Executions, which would have been produced by Universal Studios.

== Writings ==
Simon Rich at the 2026 New York Film Festival for Artificial

=== Short stories ===
As an undergraduate at Harvard University in 2007, Rich received a two-book contract from Random House. His first book, a collection of short humor pieces entitled Ant Farm: And Other Desperate Situations, was published in 2007 and was nominated for the Thurber Prize for American Humor. His second collection, Free Range Chickens, was published in 2008.

Rich released his third collection of stories, The Last Girlfriend on Earth, in 2013. Reception was favorable, with The Washington Post praising the book as "hilarious," declaring, "it just might be the best one-night stand you'll ever have."

The Last Girlfriend on Earth was given a pilot order by FX within a week of its publishing as Man Seeking Woman. The show was officially ordered by FXX with the leading cast of Jay Baruchel, Eric Andre, Britt Lower and Maya Erskine, with Rich as show-runner and executive producer, making him one of the youngest creators in TV history. The show was produced by Lorne Michaels' Broadway Video and ran on FXX for three seasons.

Rich's fourth story collection, Spoiled Brats, was published in 2014. The Guardian described it as "simply the funniest book of the year," adding, "there are sometimes three laugh-out-loud moments within the same paragraph." The Evening Standard also praised the book, calling Rich "a Thurber, even a Wodehouse, for today. Who could ask for more? You can give his books to people and just watch them laugh."

A fifth collection, Hits and Misses, was published in July 2018. NPR said, "with this book, Rich has come into his own as one of the most talented writers of comedic fiction working today." In 2019, Rich won the Thurber Prize for American Humor for Hits and Misses.

Rich's sixth story collection, New Teeth, was published in July 2021.

His seventh short story collection, Glory Days, was published in July 2024.

=== Novels ===
Rich's third book and first novel, Elliot Allagash, was released in May 2010. In June that year, Jason Reitman optioned the movie rights to the novel.

In 2012, Rich published his second novel, What in God's Name, which The New York Times Book Review compared to Douglas Adams's The Hitchhiker's Guide to the Galaxy. In 2019, the novel was adapted for the first season of the TV series Miracle Workers. The same year, Back Bay Books reissued the novel under the title Miracle Workers. Subsequently, Rich's short story "Revolution" inspired the second season of the series.

=== Stage ===
Rich's first play, All In: Comedy About Love by Simon Rich, which is based on some of his short stories, premiered on Broadway on December 11, 2024. Scheduled for a 10-week run at the Hudson Theatre, the production featured a rotating cast of four performers at a time, which initially included John Mulaney, Fred Armisen, Renée Elise Goldsberry and Richard Kind for the first five weeks of performances, and Lin-Manuel Miranda, Chloe Fineman, Andrew Rannells, Aidy Bryant, Sam Richardson and others in subsequent weeks.

His second play, All Out: Comedy About Ambition, was a follow up to his first one. It premiered on December 12, 2025 at the Nederlander Theater on Broadway and closed on March 8, 2026 after 95 shows.

== Influences ==
Simon Rich has called Woody Allen his hero, specifically citing his short-story collections as major influences. He has also cited Roald Dahl and Mel Brooks as influences.

== Personal life ==
Rich lives in Los Angeles with his wife, author Kathleen Hale. They have two daughters.

Regarding his religious beliefs, he previously called himself an atheist. However, in a 2019 interview, he said, "To call yourself an atheist means you are certain about something, and I am not sure about anything."

== Filmography ==
=== Film ===
Year	Title	Writer	Producer
2020	An American Pickle	Yes	Yes
2026	Artificial	Yes	Yes

Additional story material

- Inside Out (2015)
- Wonka (2023)
- A Minecraft Movie (2025)

=== Television ===
Year	Title	Writer	Creator	Executive producer	Notes
2007–2011	Saturday Night Live	Yes	No	No	78 episodes
2015–2017	Man Seeking Woman	Yes	Yes	Yes	30 episodes
2017	The Simpsons	Yes	No	No	Episode "A Father's Watch"
2019–2023	Miracle Workers	Yes	Yes	Yes	37 episodes

Appearances

- CH Live: NYC (2009)
- Late Night with Seth Meyers (2014)

== Bibliography ==
=== Novels ===
- Elliot Allagash. New York: Random House. 2010.
- What in God's Name. New York: Little, Brown and Company. 2012. (reissued in 2019 under the title Miracle Workers)

=== Short fiction ===
Collections

- Ant Farm: And Other Desperate Situations. New York: Random House. 2007.
- Free Range Chickens. New York: Random House. 2008.
- The Last Girlfriend on Earth: And Other Love Stories. New York: Reagan Arthur Books. 2013.
- Spoiled Brats. New York: Little, Brown and Company. 2014.
- Hits & Misses: Stories. New York: Little, Brown and Company. 2018.
- New Teeth: Stories. New York: Little, Brown and Company. 2021.
- Glory Days: Stories. New York: Little, Brown and Company. 2024.

=== Essays, reporting and other contributions ===
- "Your new college graduate : a parents' guide". Shouts & Murmurs. The New Yorker. Vol. 86, no. 14. May 24, 2010. p. 33.
- "Mario". Shouts & Murmurs. The New Yorker. Vol. 98, no. 10. May 2, 2022. pp. 26–29. (Note: Title in the online table of contents is "Mario, not so super at forty".)
- "History report". Shouts & Murmurs. The New Yorker. Vol. 98, no. 27. September 5, 2022. pp. 21–23. (Note: Title in the online table of contents is "When I was a boy, back before Earth got too hot to live on ...".)
