= Chaédria LaBouvier =

American curator and journalist

- Born: 1984 or 1985 (age 41–42); U.S.
- Occupations: Activist; Writer; Curator
- Years active: 2007–present

Chaédria LaBouvier is an American curator and writer. In 2019, she became the first person of Cuban descent to curate an exhibition in the Guggenheim's 80-year history, as well as the first black author of a Guggenheim catalogue, for the exhibition, "Basquiat's Defacement: The Untold Story". Her public allegations of racist treatment by the Guggenheim were not substantiated by an outside investigation, but were followed by the resignation of its chief curator and artistic director, who had first invited LaBouvier to guest curate the exhibition, and coincided with the hiring of its first full-time black curator.

== Early life and education ==
LaBouvier grew up in Texas, and has described her family roots as arising from "the Texas-Louisiana Creole enclaves" of the Deep South. Her fascination with Basquiat began as a child, as her parents owned three of the artist's drawings.

In 2007, LaBouvier received a B.A. in history from Williams College. In 2014, she earned a masters of fine arts degree in screenwriting from the University of California, Los Angeles (UCLA).

== Career ==
In 2019, LaBouvier was hired by the Solomon R. Guggenheim Museum as the first black guest curator and the second black curator in the history of the Guggenheim (following Nigerian curator Okwui Enwezor, 1996) to organize an exhibition. She was the first black author to write a Guggenheim catalogue.

The exhibition, "Basquiat's Defacement: The Untold Story," opened in June 2019 and covered not only Basquiat's work, but also the history of Michael Stewart, whose death from police brutality inspired the painting, The Death of Michael Stewart. Other paintings by Basquiat on the theme of police brutality and art featuring Stewart by Keith Haring, George Condo and Lyle Ashton Harris were also included in the exhibition. The focus of the show on Stewart and the struggle of black men living in the United States set the show apart from other exhibitions on Basquiat, according to WNYC. The show ran for five months with hundreds of thousands of visitors.

On February 25, 2021, LaBouvier received a Bicentennial Medal from Williams College, becoming the youngest medalist in the award's history.

== Controversy ==
LaBouvier called her experience with the Guggenheim as shaped by artistic director Nancy Spector and other leadership as "the most racist professional experience of my life." LaBouvier described additional specific instances of her treatment on her personal Twitter account and in news articles.

After criticism from LaBouvier, the Guggenheim hired an external firm to investigate her claims, LaBouvier declined to contribute to the investigation of her own allegations. It ultimately found "no evidence that Ms. LaBouvier was subject to adverse treatment on the basis of her race." However, while the investigation was under way, museum employees submitted a public letter to the board, calling for them to "replace those members of the executive cabinet who have repeatedly proven that they are not committed to decisive, anti-racist action and do not act in good faith with BIPOC leaders." After the investigation's conclusion, Spector voluntarily parted ways with the museum.

Because of her public statements and actions, LaBouvier has been recognized as a catalyst for the "Change the Museum" movement.
