= Edith Brown Weiss =

American lawyer and legal scholar (born 1942)

- Born: Edith Brown; February 19, 1942 (age 84); Salem, Oregon, U.S.
- Education: Stanford University (BA); Harvard Law School (JD); University of California (Berkeley) (PH.D)
- Spouse: Charles Weiss (m. 1969)
- Children: 2

Edith Brown Weiss (born February 19, 1942) is an American lawyer and legal scholar, known for her contributions on International Law; specifically International Environmental Law. From 1994–1996, she served as President of the American Society of International Law. She has worked for many international organizations, including the World Bank, where she was part of the Inspection Panel from 2002–2007, and the United Nations Environment Programmer's International Advisory Council on Environmental Justice. Currently, she is the Francis Cabell Brown Professor of International Law at Georgetown University; she has been a faculty member at Georgetown since 1978.

Brown has received many prizes for her work; she was awarded the Elizabeth Haub prize from the Free University of Brussels, the American Society of International Law's Certificate of Merit, and an international prize for international environmental law from the Center for International Environmental Law, among others.

== Education ==
Brown attended Stanford University for her undergraduate education where she received a Bachelor's of Art degree with Great Distinction. Later, she obtained an LL.B (J.D) from Harvard Law School, a Ph.D. in Political Science from the University of California (Berkeley), and an Honorary Doctor of Laws from Chicago Kent College of Law.

== Career ==
Brown started her teaching career at Princeton University where she taught civil engineering and politics. In 1978 she joined the faculty staff of Georgetown University, and she is currently the Francis Cabell Brown Professor of International Law at Georgetown University Law Center. Outside of her teaching career, Brown has held several high ranking positions in organizations related to International Law and International Environmental Law. From 1994 to 1996, she was the President of the American Society of International Law, and later worked as an Associate General Counsel for the U.S. Environmental Protection Agency, establishing the Division of International Environmental Law. In 2002, Brown served for a period of five years on the Inspection Panel of the World Bank, and worked as the chaired the Panel until 2007. She has also worked with the U.S National Academy of Sciences’ Commission on Geosciences, Environment, and Resources; the Water Science and Technology Board; the Environmental Studies Board; and the Committee on Sustainable Water Supplies in the Middle East. She was a director for the Cousteau Society, the Center for International Environmental Law, the Japanese Institute for Global Environmental Strategies, and the National Center for Atmospheric Research.

Throughout her career, Brown has been a member of several editorial boards, including the American Journal of International Law and the Journal of International Economic Law.

== Personal life ==
She is married to Charles "Chuck" Weiss, a retired Georgetown professor, with whom she has a son, Jed and a daughter, Tamara.

== Awards and legacy ==
Brown has been recognized for her contributions to International Environmental Law. In 1994, she was awarded the Elizabeth Haub Prize by the Free University of Brussels and the international Council of Environmental Law. Two years later, in 1996, she received the Prominent Women in International Law Award, given by the American Society of International Law. In 2003, Brown was awarded with the American Bar Association Award for Distinguished Achievement in Environmental Law and Policy. In 2008, she received the Award for International Environmental Law form the Center for International Environmental Law, and in 2010 she was recognized with the Manley O. Hudson Medal from the American Society of International Law. Brown has published numerous books on International Environmental Law. Her most recognized book is In Fairness to Future Generations. This book won the American Society of International Law (ASIL) award, and has been translated from the original English to French, Spanish, Japanese and Chinese.

In the 2026 Tom McCarthy film A Statement, she is portrayed by Tatiana Maslany.

== Publications ==
1. Edith Brown Weiss, Daniel Barstow Magraw, Stephen C. McCaffrey, Stephanie Tai & A. Dan Tarlock, International Law for the Environment (St. Paul, Minn.: West Academic Publishing 2016 & Documents Supp. 2016).
2. Edith Brown Weiss, International Law for a Water-Scarce World (Leiden, Neth.: Martinus Nijhoff Publishers 2013).
3. Reconciling Environment and Trade (Edith Brown Weiss, John H. Jackson & Nathalie Bernasconi-Osterwalder eds., Leiden, Neth.: Martinus Nijhoff Publishers 2d ed. 2008).
4. Edith Brown Weiss, Stephen C. McCaffrey, Daniel Barstow Magraw & A. Dan Tarlock, International Environmental Law and Policy (New York: Aspen Publishers 2d ed. 2007).
5. Fresh Water and International Economic Law (Edith Brown Weiss, Laurence Boisson de Chazournes & Nathalie Bernasconi-Osterwalder eds., Oxford: Oxford University Press 2005).
6. Reconciling Environment and Trade (Edith Brown Weiss & John H. Jackson eds., Ardsley, N.Y.: Transnational Publishers 2001).
7. Selected Essays on Understanding International Institutions and the Legislative Process(Edith Brown Weiss & Paul C. Szasz eds., Ardsley, N.Y.: Transnational Publishers 2001).
8. Edith Brown Weiss, Gong ping di dui dai wei lai ren lei: guo ji fa, gong tong yi chan yu shi dai jian heng ping [In Fairness to Future Generations: International Law, Common Patrimony, and Intergenerational Equity] (Wang Jing, Yu Fang & Lin Feng trans., Beijing: Fa lü chu ban she Chinese ed. 2000).
9. Edith Brown Weiss, Daniel Barstow Magraw & Paul C. Szasz, International Environmental Law: Basic Instruments and References, 1992-1999 (Ardsley, N.Y.: Transnational Publishers 1999).
10. The World Bank, International Financial Institutions, and the Development of International Law (Edith Brown Weiss, Address Rigo Sureda & Laurence Boisson de Chazournes eds., D.C.: American Society of International Law 1999).
11. Engaging Countries: Strengthening Compliance with International Environmental Accords (Edith Brown Weiss & Harold K. Jacobson eds., Cambridge, Mass.: MIT Press 1998).
12. Edith Brown Weiss, Stephen C. McCaffrey, Daniel Barstow Magraw, Paul C. Szasz & Robert E. Lutz, International Environmental Law and Policy (New York: Aspen Law & Business 1998).
13. International Compliance with Nonbinding Accords (Edith Brown Weiss ed., D.C.: American Society of International Law 1997).
14. Environmental Change and International Law: New Challenges and Dimensions (Edith Brown Weiss ed., Tokyo, Japan: United Nations University Press 1992).
15. Edith Brown Weiss, Daniel Barstow Magraw & Paul C. Szasz, International Environmental Law: Basic Instruments and References (Dobbs Ferry, N.Y.: Transnational Publishers 1992).
16. Edith Brown Weiss, In Fairness to Future Generations: International Law, Common Patrimony, and Intergenerational Equity (Dobbs Ferry, N.Y.: Transnational Publishers & Tokyo, Japan: United Nations University 1989).
17. Edith Brown Weiss, Seyom Brown, Nina W. Cornell & Larry L. Fabian, Regimes for the Ocean: Outer Space & Weather (D.C.: Brookings Institution 1977).
