= Good Night, and Good Luck (play) =

Play by George Clooney and Grant Heslov

- Playbill cover
- Original language: English
- Written by: George Clooney; Grant Heslov
- Based on: Good Night, and Good Luck by: George Clooney; Grant Heslov
- Characters: Edward R. Murrow; Don Hollenbeck
- Genre: Historical drama

Premiere
- Date: March 12, 2025
- Place: Winter Garden Theatre

Good Night, and Good Luck is a historical drama play written by George Clooney and Grant Heslov. It is adapted from their 2005 film and focuses on the conflict between veteran CBS journalist Edward R. Murrow and U.S. Senator Joseph McCarthy. The play's Broadway premiere in March 2025, directed by David Cromer, starred Clooney as Murrow, making his Broadway debut.

The play received mostly positive reviews, with critics praising its themes, direction, lead performance and scenic design, though some questioned its use of projections and whether it improved on the film. The production has enjoyed strong box office returns. It was nominated for five Tony Awards, including best actor for Clooney and four design awards.

The June 7 performance was broadcast live on CNN and CNN International and streamed live, becoming the first Broadway production to be aired live on television. The final performance of the play was on June 8, 2025.

== Plot ==
The play's story closely follows the plot of the 2005 film, which portrays the conflict between veteran CBS journalist Edward R. Murrow and U.S. Senator Joseph McCarthy of Wisconsin regarding the Senator's investigations and use of the Senate Permanent Subcommittee on Investigations to blacklist people suspected of being communist. Near the end, the play adds a projected montage depicting the evolution of news coverage, showing archival footage including the destruction of the World Trade Center, the January 6 United States Capitol attack, and ending with Elon Musk’s alleged Nazi salute.

== Conception ==
The film was a direct response to the United States' involvement in the Iraq War. According to Clooney, the Broadway production is a response to the attack on free speech and journalism by President Donald Trump and his administration. Clooney says he wrote the film as a way to open the discussion of an era "when the press held their government to account". The film and the play's co-writer Grant Heslov says of the story that it will remain relevant and "stand the test of time". According to Dalton Ross of Entertainment Weekly, the story's "focus on the unchecked power of an elected official using fear, rumor, and lies against his enemies ... hits even harder in 2025 than it did" in the film in 2005.

In the film, which Clooney also directed, he portrayed Fred W. Friendly, a friend of Murrow's and producer of See It Now. On Broadway, Clooney plays Murrow; the role was portrayed by David Strathairn in the film. Clooney said about taking the role, "Murrow had a gravitas to him that at 42 years old I wasn't able to pull off". It was Clooney's first role on stage since the 1986 American play Vicious about the life of Sex Pistols musician Sid Vicious, where he played a male prostitute drug dealer.

The plot of the play is very similar to the plot of the film, except for the new ending. When portraying Murrow in the studio, Clooney faces away from the audience towards a camera, which then transmits a live image to a giant screen in the center of the stage and additional monitors along the perimeter.

== Promotion ==
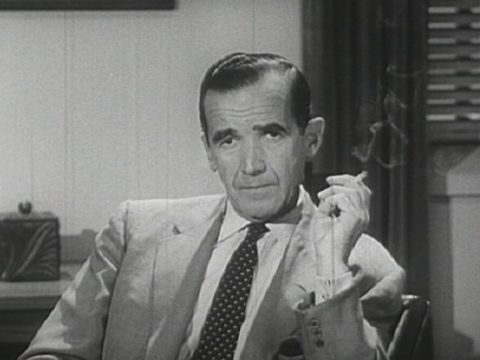
News anchor Edward R. Murrow (pictured), the central character in the play

During the promotion for the play, Clooney gave a wide-ranging interview to 60 Minutes, where he discussed the role of journalism and a free press in a democracy. He noted similarities between the events portrayed in Good Night, and Good Luck and the modern-day challenges journalists encounter in seeking the truth, including lawsuits brought against news organizations by Donald Trump and his administration. Richard Alvin of Business Matters agreed, calling the play "worryingly relevant. ... [W]hat struck me most was ... that somewhere between Murrow’s smoky sign-off and the arrival of TikTok news, we lost the fourth estate. ... It started with fear."

== Productions ==
The play began previews at the Winter Garden Theatre on March 12, 2025, starring George Clooney, in his Broadway debut as Edward R. Murrow, Ilana Glazer, Paul Gross, Christopher Denham, Glenn Fleshler, Fran Kranz, Mac Brandt and Carter Hudson. It was produced by Greg Nobile. It had its opening night on April 3, when journalists and news anchors such as Lesley Stahl, Chris Wallace, Gayle King, Jake Tapper, Pamela Brown and George Stephanopoulos attended. The production closed on June 8, 2025.

The play enjoyed strong box office grosses, setting the historical Broadway weekly record. For the week ending May 4, 2025, the play's gross of $4,003,481.50, made it the first Broadway play to surpass $4 million in a week. Its last weekly gross, $4.33 million, was also its highest, setting the last of its string of records as the highest-grossing non-musical Broadway play. 155,000 people attended the Broadway run.

The June 7 performance was broadcast live by CNN and CNN International, and streamed live on the CNN app, Max and CNN.com. It was the first time a Broadway production was aired live on television. 7.34 million total viewers saw the live presentation over all platforms.

== Cast and characters ==
Characters	Broadway
Characters	2025
Edward R. Murrow	George Clooney
Shirley Wershba	Ilana Glazer
Fred W. Friendly	Glenn Fleshler
Don Hollenbeck	Clark Gregg
Joseph Wershba	Carter Hudson
William S. Paley	Paul Gross
John Aaron	Christopher Denham
Palmer Williams	Fran Kranz
Colonel Anderson	Mac Brandt
Don Hewitt	Will Dagger
Ella / Jazz Singer	Georgia Heers

== Critical reception ==
The production received mostly positive reviews, with critics praising Clooney's performance and the play's faithfulness to the source material, timely subject matter, and lavish scenic design. Jesse Green of The New York Times selected the production as a Critics' Pick, describing it as "a slender, swift and healthy exercise in hagiography". Green praised David Cromer's "suave direction" and Clooney's performance as being full of "wit, integrity and charming modesty." Frank Rizzo of Variety wrote: "This transfer from screen to stage is as intense and laser-focused as the penetrating gaze coming from its star and co-writer, George Clooney." Sara Holden of Vulture wrote that "there's undeniably something bracing about Clooney's revisitation" and added: "Clooney – probably the closest thing contemporary Hollywood has to a Cary Grant – carries [a] sense of responsibility onto the stage". Dalton Ross, in Entertainment Weekly, praised the performances, the set, the ending and the production generally, but he felt the play's close retelling of the film plot was "both a strength and a weakness". He quibbled primarily with the convention of Clooney facing upstage to portray Murrow's broadcasts on television.

Some mixed or negative reviews questioned the play's theatricality and high ticket prices. Adam Feldman of Time Out wrote that "consumers should be warned that nothing in this perfectly pleasant production is better than what you can get at home by renting the movie for $3.99." Frank Scheck of New York Stage Review opined that "there's nothing inherently theatrical" about the production" and that it "pretty much replicates the film". David Gordon of TheaterMania described it as an "empty reassembly of their screenplay" which lacks tension, adding that "the play doesn’t trust the audience to see the parallels between past and present, creating little more than a well-intentioned echo chamber instead of a gripping 90-minutes of theater."

== Accolades ==
=== 2025 Broadway production ===
Year	Award	Category	Nominated work	Result	Ref.
2025	Tony Awards	Best Actor in a Play	George Clooney	Nominated	
2025	Tony Awards	Best Scenic Design of a Play	Scott Pask	Nominated	
2025	Tony Awards	Best Costume Design of a Play	Brenda Abbandandolo	Nominated	
2025	Tony Awards	Best Lighting Design of a Play	Heather Gilbert and David Bengali	Nominated	
2025	Tony Awards	Best Sound Design of a Play	Daniel Kluger	Nominated	
2025	Drama League Award	Outstanding Production of a Play	Good Night, and Good Luck	Nominated	
2025	Drama League Award	Outstanding Direction of a Play	David Cromer	Nominated	
2025	Drama League Award	Distinguished Performance	George Clooney	Nominated	
2025	Outer Critics Circle Award	John Gassner Award (new American play)	George Clooney and Grant Heslov	Won	
2025	Theater World Award	Outstanding Broadway Debut Performer/Playwright	George Clooney	Honored	
