= Tom McCarthy (director) =

American filmmaker and actor (born 1966)

- McCarthy at the 2026 New York Film Festival
- Born: Thomas Joseph McCarthy; June 7, 1966 (age 60); New Providence, New Jersey, U.S.
- Education: Boston College (BA); Yale University (MFA)
- Occupations: Actor; director; screenwriter; producer
- Years active: 1992–present

Thomas Joseph McCarthy (born June 7, 1966) is an American filmmaker and actor who has appeared in several films, including Meet the Parents and Good Night, and Good Luck, and television series such as The Wire, Boston Public, and Law & Order.

McCarthy has received critical acclaim for his writing and directing work for the independent films The Station Agent (2003), The Visitor (2007), Win Win (2011), and Spotlight (2015), the last of which won the Academy Award for Best Picture, won McCarthy the Academy Award for Best Original Screenplay, and earned him a nomination for the Academy Award for Best Director. McCarthy also directed Stillwater (2021), based on a script he co-wrote.

McCarthy also co-wrote the film Up (2009) with Bob Peterson and Pete Docter, for which they received an Academy Award nomination for Best Original Screenplay. He also wrote Million Dollar Arm (2014), and directed and executive-produced the Netflix television series 13 Reasons Why (2017).

== Early life ==
McCarthy was raised in New Providence, New Jersey, one of five children of Carol and Eugene F. "Gene" McCarthy; His father worked in the textile industry. McCarthy was raised Catholic in a family of Irish descent. He is a graduate of New Providence High School in New Providence, New Jersey and Boston College (1988), where he was a member of the improv comedy troupe My Mother's Fleabag; and the Yale School of Drama, where he studied under Earle R. Gister.

== Career ==
McCarthy spent several years doing stand-up comedy and theater in Minneapolis and Chicago before going into television and film. He starred in Flags of Our Fathers as James Bradley, and in the final season of The Wire as the morally challenged reporter Scott Templeton. He made his Broadway debut in the 2001 revival of Noises Off.

McCarthy's directorial debut, The Station Agent, which he also wrote, won the Audience Award and the Waldo Salt Screenwriting Award at the 2003 Sundance Film Festival. It also won the BAFTA Award for Best Original Screenplay, the Independent Spirit Award for Best First Screenplay, the Independent Spirit John Cassavetes Award, and awards at film festivals ranging from San Sebastian to Stockholm, Mexico City, and Aspen.

McCarthy's second feature film was The Visitor, which premiered at the 2007 Toronto International Film Festival, and for which McCarthy won the 2008 Independent Spirit Award for Best Director. He appeared in the 2009 dramas The Lovely Bones and 2012. In 2010, he was nominated for an Academy Award for Best Original Screenplay for the Pixar animated film Up, which he co-wrote.

In 2010, McCarthy directed the unaired pilot for the HBO series Game of Thrones, but the final cut of the episode was poorly received by showrunners David Benioff and D. B. Weiss. McCarthy was replaced by Tim Van Patten, who directed the final version of the pilot that aired in 2011. The experience discouraged McCarthy from returning to television directing for several years.

He also co-wrote and directed 2011's Win Win, based on his experiences as a wrestler at New Providence High School.

McCarthy's independent drama film Spotlight (2015) was widely acclaimed. It received six Academy Awards nominations, three Golden Globe Awards nominations, two Screen Actors Guild Awards nominations, and eight Critics' Choice Movie Awards nominations.

McCarthy directed the first two episodes of 13 Reasons Why, from Anonymous Content and Paramount Television. It is based on the 2007 The New York Times bestselling YA book by Jay Asher. In 2019, he signed a first-look TV deal with Fox 21 Television Studios (now 20th Television).

In 2026, Sony Pictures Classics acquired worldwide rights to McCarthy’s next film A Statement, an adaptation of Losing Earth, with production scheduled to begin at the end of February.

== Filmography ==
=== Film ===
Year	Title	Credit			Notes
Year	Title	Director	Writer	Producer	Notes
2003	The Station Agent	Yes	Yes	No	BAFTA Award for Best Original Screenplay
2007	The Visitor	Yes	Yes	No	
2009	Up	No	Story	No	Nominated – Academy Award for Best Original Screenplay
2011	Win Win	Yes	Yes	Yes	
2014	Million Dollar Arm	No	Yes	No	
2014	The Cobbler	Yes	Yes	Yes	
2015	Spotlight	Yes	Yes	No	Academy Award for Best Picture; Academy Award for Best Original Screenplay; BAFTA Award for Best Original Screenplay; Nominated – Academy Award for Best Director; Nominated – Golden Globe Award for Best Director; Nominated – Golden Globe Award for Best Screenplay
2018	Christopher Robin	No	Yes	No	
2018	The Nutcracker and the Four Realms	No	Uncredited	No	Rewrites on reshoots
2020	Timmy Failure: Mistakes Were Made	Yes	Yes	Yes	
2021	Stillwater	Yes	Yes	Yes	
2026	The Gallerist	No	No	Yes	
2026	A Statement	Yes	Yes	Yes	

==== Acting credits ====
Year	Title	Role	Notes
1992	Crossing the Bridge	Chris	
1993	Rift	Bartender #1	
1997	Conspiracy Theory	Helicopter Spotter	
1999	In My Sister's Shadow	Michael Butler	
1999	30 Days	Brad Drazin	
2000	Certain Guys	Mitch	
2000	Meet the Parents	Dr. Robert "Bob" Banks	
2002	The Guru	Lars	
2004	The Last Shot	Agent Pike	
2005	Good Night, and Good Luck	Palmer Williams	
2005	Syriana	Fred Franks	
2005	The Great New Wonderful	David Burbage	
2006	All the King's Men	Editor	
2006	The Situation	Major Hanks	
2006	Beautiful Ohio	Older William Messerman	
2006	Flags of Our Fathers	James Bradley	
2007	Year of the Dog	Pier Spade	
2007	Michael Clayton	Walter	Voice only
2008	Baby Mama	Kate's Date	
2009	Mammoth	Bob	
2009	Duplicity	Jeff Bauer	
2009	The Lovely Bones	Principal Caden	
2009	2012	Gordon Silberman	
2010	Jack Goes Boating	Dr. Bob	
2010	Fair Game	Jeff	
2010	Little Fockers	Dr. Bob	
2015	Pixels	Michael the Robot	
2024	The Friend	Dr. Warren	
2026	Anima	Pete	
2026	Evil Genius	Brian Wells	

=== Television ===
Year	Title	Credit			Notes
Year	Title	Director	Writer	Producer	Notes
2010	Game of Thrones	Yes	No	No	Unaired pilot
2011	Game of Thrones	No	No	Consulting	Episode: "Winter Is Coming"
2014	Kim Philby: His Most Intimate Betrayal	Yes	No	Yes	BBC docudrama, episode 2
2017–2020	13 Reasons Why	Yes	No	Executive	Episodes "Tape 1, Side A" and "Tape 1, Side B"
2019	The Loudest Voice	No	Yes	Executive	Also creator
2022–2023	Alaska Daily	Yes	Yes	Executive	Also creator

==== Acting credits ====
Year	Title	Role	Notes
1996	Mary & Tim	Tim Melville	Television film
1996	New York Undercover	Gus Farina	Episode "Toy Soldiers"
1998	Saint Maybe	Ian Bedloe	Television film
1998	Spin City	Priest	Episode "Bye, Bye, Birdie"
2000	D.C.	Joseph Scott	Episode "Truth"
2000	Law & Order: Special Victims Unit	Nick Ganzer	Episode "Contact"
2000	Ally McBeal	Peter Hanks	Episode "Do You Wanna Dance?"
2000–2001	Boston Public	Kevin Riley	14 episodes
2001	The Practice	Kevin Riley	Episode "The Day After"
2002–2008	Law & Order	Various characters	3 episodes
2008	The Wire	Scott Templeton	10 episodes
2020	Little America	Professor Robbins	Episode "The Cowboy"
2022	The Last Movie Stars	Sidney Lumet (voice)	Documentary series
2025	The Lowdown	Trip Keating	4 episodes

== Other awards and nominations ==
Year	Title	Award
2003	The Station Agent	Independent Spirit Award for Best First Screenplay; Independent Spirit John Cassavetes Award; Las Vegas Film Critics Society Award for Best Screenplay; Sundance Film Festival Audience Award (Dramatic); Sundance Film Festival Waldo Salt Screenwriting Award; Nominated – Satellite Award for Best Original Screenplay; Nominated – Writers Guild of America Award for Best Original Screenplay
2007	The Visitor	Brisbane International Film Festival Interfaith Award; Deauville American Film Festival Grand Special Prize; Independent Spirit Award for Best Director; Method Fest Independent Film Festival Award for Best Director; Satellite Award for Best Original Screenplay; Nominated – Satellite Award for Best Director; Nominated – Writers Guild of America Award for Best Original Screenplay
2009	Up	Nominated – Annie Award for Writing in a Feature Production; Nominated – Hugo Award for Best Dramatic Presentation – Long Form
2011	Win Win	Nominated – Critics' Choice Movie Award for Best Screenplay; Nominated – Writers Guild of America Award for Best Original Screenplay
2014	The Cobbler	Nominated – Saturn Award for Best DVD or Blu-ray Release
2015	Spotlight	AACTA International Award for Best Screenplay; Alliance of Women Film Journalists Award for Best Director; Alliance of Women Film Journalists Award for Best Original Screenplay; Awards Circuit Community Award for Best Director; Awards Circuit Community Award for Best Original Screenplay; Boston Online Film Critics Association Award for Best Original Screenplay; Boston Society of Film Critics Award for Best Screenplay; Central Ohio Film Critics Association Award for Best Director; Central Ohio Film Critics Association Award for Best Original Screenplay; Chicago Film Critics Association Award for Best Original Screenplay; Chicago International Film Festival Best Narrative English-Language Feature; Critics' Choice Movie Award for Best Screenplay; Dallas–Fort Worth Film Critics Association Award for Best Screenplay; Denver Film Critics Society Award for Best Original Screenplay; Detroit Film Critics Society Award for Best Original Screenplay; Florida Film Critics Circle Award for Best Screenplay; Independent Spirit Award for Best Director; Independent Spirit Award for Best Screenplay; London Film Critics' Circle Award for Screenwriter of the Year; Los Angeles Film Critics Association Award for Best Screenplay; National Society of Film Critics Award for Best Screenplay; Satellite Award for Best Director; Satellite Award for Best Original Screenplay; Writers Guild of America Award for Best Original Screenplay; Nominated – Austin Film Critics Association Award for Best Director; Nominated – Austin Film Critics Association Award for Best Original Screenplay; Nominated – Chicago Film Critics Association Award for Best Director; Nominated – Critics' Choice Movie Award for Best Director; Nominated – Denver Film Critics Society Award for Best Director; Nominated – Detroit Film Critics Society Award for Best Director; Nominated – Directors Guild of America Award for Outstanding Directing – Feature Film; Nominated – Florida Film Critics Circle Award for Best Director; Nominated – National Society of Film Critics Award for Best Director; Nominated – Washington D.C. Area Film Critics Association Award for Best Original Screenplay

Directed Academy Award performances
Under McCarthy's direction, these actors have received Academy Award nominations for their performances in their respective roles.

Year	Performer	Film	Result
Academy Award for Best Actor
2008	Richard Jenkins	The Visitor	Nominated
Academy Award for Best Supporting Actor
2015	Mark Ruffalo	Spotlight	Nominated
Academy Award for Best Supporting Actress
2015	Rachel McAdams	Spotlight	Nominated
