= Fran Kranz =

American actor

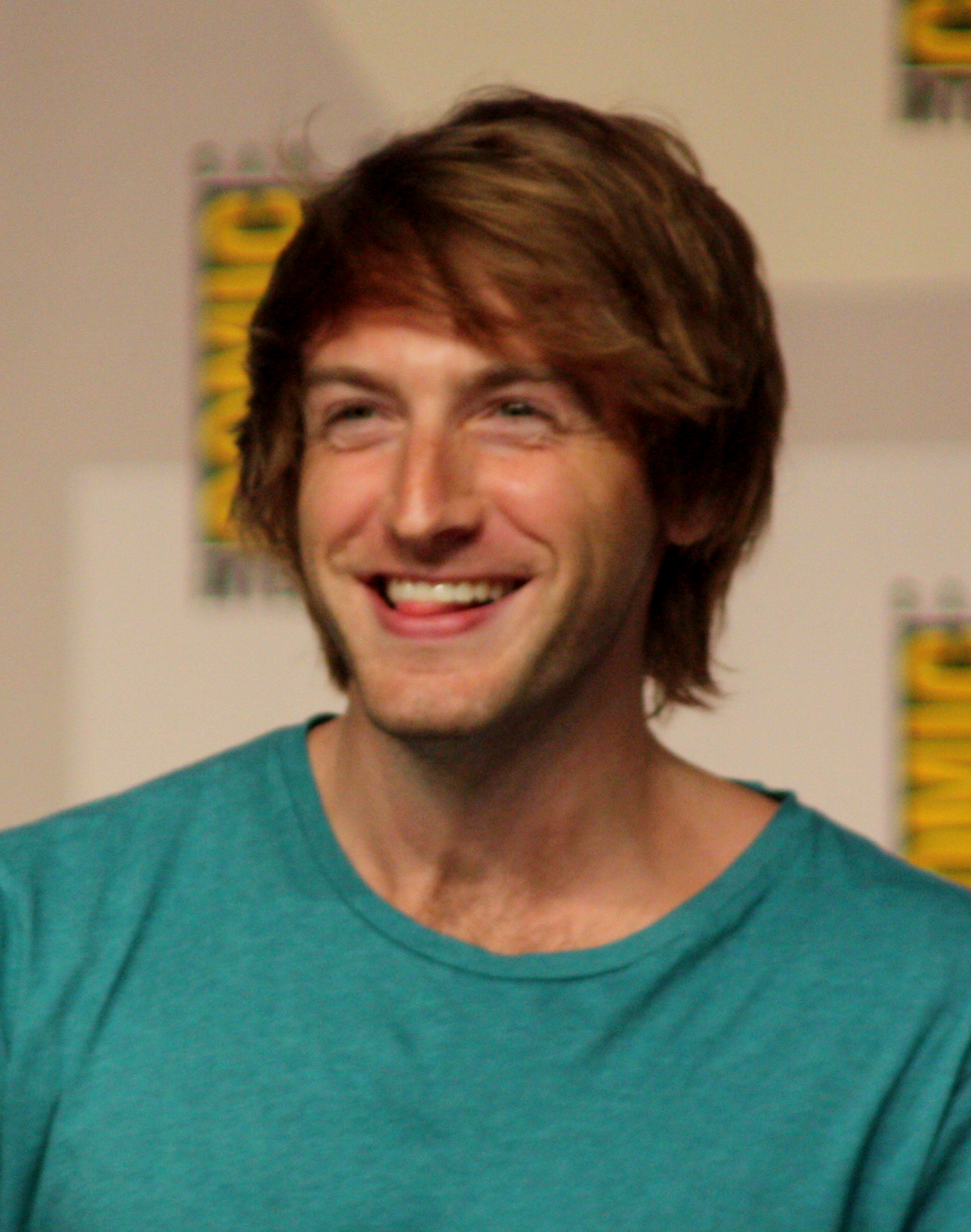
- Kranz in 2009
- Born: Francis Elliott Kranz; July 13, 1981 (age 45); Los Angeles, California, U.S.
- Education: Harvard-Westlake School
- Alma mater: Yale University (BA)
- Occupation: Actor
- Years active: 1998–present
- Spouse: Spencer Margaret Richmond (m. 2015; div. 2021)
- Children: 1
- Relatives: Jaclyn Smith (former-mother-in-law); Anthony B. Richmond (former-father-in-law)

Francis Elliott Kranz (born July 13, 1981) is an American actor and film director. He is known for his portrayal of Topher Brink in the Fox science fiction drama series Dollhouse. Kranz had prominent roles in the films The Cabin in the Woods and Much Ado About Nothing. In 2012, he played Bernard in Death of a Salesman, beginning a career on Broadway that continued with 2014's You Can't Take It with You.

Kranz made his feature directorial debut with Mass (2021), which premiered at the Sundance Film Festival to critical acclaim. From 2022 to 2023, he was a regular cast member in the Max series Julia.

== Personal life ==
Kranz was born and raised in Los Angeles, California. He started acting in third and fourth grade, and knew from a very young age that he wanted to become an actor. Kranz graduated from Harvard-Westlake School in 2000 and from Yale University in 2004, where he was a member of the improv comedy group The Ex!t Players.

In 2015, Kranz married actress Spencer Margaret Richmond, daughter of Charlie's Angels actress Jaclyn Smith and filmmaker Tony Richmond. In 2016, their daughter was born. On July 6, 2020, she filed for divorce.

== Filmography ==
=== Film ===
Year	Title	Role	Notes
2001	Donnie Darko	Frank's Friend	
2001	Training Day	College Driver	
2002	Orange County	Shane Brainard	
2003	Matchstick Men	Slacker Boyfriend	
2003	Swordswallowers and Thin Men	Adrian	
2004	The Village	Christop Crane	
2004	Admissions	James Parks	
2005	Hitch	Coca Cola Guy	Uncredited
2006	Bickford Shmeckler's Cool Ideas	Ralph	
2006	The Night of the White Pants	Millian Hagan	
2006	The TV Set	Zach Harper	
2006	Whirlygirl	Freddie	
2007	Careless	Mitch	
2007	Rise: Blood Hunter	Alex	
2008	Wieners	Joel	
2008	Shades of Ray	Sal Garfinkle	
2008	Last Meal	Noah	Short film
2009	Homeland	Arne	
2009	My Two Fans	Thad	
2010	Don't Fade Away	Ben	
2011	Diary of A Wimpy Kid: Rodrick Rules	Bill Walter	
2011	The Cabin in the Woods	Marty	
2011	The Five Stages of Grief	Daniel	Short film
2012	Much Ado About Nothing	Claudio	
2012	It's Not You, It's Me	Jack	Short film
2012	Putzel	Salmon Guy	
2013	Seasick Sailor	Wormy Guy	Short film
2014	Lust for Love	Astor	
2014	Before I Disappear	Darren	
2014	Murder of a Cat	Clinton	
2014	Last Weekend	Sean Oakes	
2014	The Living	Teddy	
2014	Seven Lovers	Brian	
2015	Bloodsucking Bastards	Evan	
2015	The Truth About Lies	Gilby Smalls	
2015	Mojave	Bob	
2016	Rebirth	Kyle	
2017	A Happening of Monumental Proportions	Mr. Rolf	
2017	A Midsummer Night's Dream	Bottom	Also producer
2017	The Dark Tower	Pimli	
2018	You Might Be the Killer	Sam	
2019	Fanboy	Jeremiah Brennan	Short film
2019	Jungleland	Buck Noble	
2021	Mass	—	Director, writer, and producer
2022	Silk	Short Sol	Short film
2024	They Whisper	Silas	
2024	Half Lives	Luke	

=== Television ===
Year	Title	Role	Notes
1998	Frasier	Aaron	Episode: "Good Grief"
2007	Untitled Christine Taylor Project	Brian	TV movie
2008	Welcome to The Captain	Josh Flug	5 episodes
2008	Private Practice	Brian	Episode: "Equal & Opposite"
2008	It's Always Sunny in Philadelphia	College Student	Episode: "Who Pooped the Bed?"
2009–2010	Dollhouse	Topher Brink	27 episodes
2011	Goodnight Burbank	Chaz Parker	Episode: "Lesbians on Acid"
2012	Dating Rules from My Future Self	Sorbet Guy	2 episodes
2013	The Good Wife	Eugene	Episode: "A More Perfect Union"
2014	Dallas	Hunter McKay	3 episodes
2016	TripTank	Various voices	2 episodes
2016	Elementary	Brendan Farley	Episode: "How the Sausage Is Made"
2017	Major Crimes	Stan Pearl	4 episodes
2018	Ballers	Yanni	3 episodes
2018–2020	Homecoming	Ron	2 episodes
2019	The Loudest Voice	Gabriel Sherman	Episode: "2012"
2022–2023	Julia	Russell Morash	Main role
2023	Party Down	Miles	Episode: "Kyle Bradway Is Nitromancer"

=== Broadway ===
Year	Title	Role	Notes
2012	Death of a Salesman	Bernard	Ethel Barrymore Theatre, starring Philip Seymour Hoffman
2014	You Can't Take It with You	Tony Kirby	Longacre Theatre, starring James Earl Jones
2025	Good Night, and Good Luck	Palmer Williams	Winter Garden Theatre

=== Web ===
Year	Title	Role	Notes
2009	MegaBot	Blue	
2012	JourneyQuest	Silver Tom	8 episodes

=== Music videos ===
Year	Title	Role	Notes
2003	The Chemical Brothers - "The Golden Path"	Main role - Office worker	
