= Palmer Williams =

American broadcast journalist (1916-1996)

Palmer Williams (1916 or 1917 – January 1, 1996) was an American broadcast journalist and documentary film maker. He worked closely with Edward R. Murrow.

== Williams with CBS ==
Williams spent most of his career at CBS News working in both radio and television. However, during World War II Williams spent time making documentaries including Frank Capra's Why We Fight; it was after the war that Williams joined CBS where he would become influential over talents such as Edward R. Murrow.

Williams played key roles in developing Hear It Now and its television counterpart See It Now, which Murrow hosted. Later in his career he would go on to produce installments of CBS News and CBS Reports. His last years before his 1981 retirement were spent as a senior producer for 60 Minutes.

== Personal life ==
Williams was born in Tenafly, New Jersey, in 1916 or 1917. His first marriage to Jane Parker, with whom he had a son, ended in divorce. He married Barbara Payne in 1949 or 1950; the couple had a two sons and a daughter together. He and Barbara were living in Greenwich Village, New York City, when he died at home – from prostate cancer – on 1 January 1996, aged 79.

== Williams in pop culture ==
Palmer Williams was portrayed by actor Thomas McCarthy (billed as Tom McCarthy) in the 2005 film Good Night, and Good Luck, and by Fran Kranz in the 2025 Broadway production of the same name.
