= All Out: Comedy About Ambition =

2025 comedy show

- Original language: English
- Written by: Simon Rich
- Music by: Lawrence
- Genre: Comedy

Premiere
- Date: December 12, 2025
- Place: Nederlander Theatre
- Directed by: Alex Timbers
- Official website

All Out: Comedy About Ambition is a show from Simon Rich which consists of live readings of short stories about "ego, envy, greed, and basically just New Yorkers in general." The first production, directed by Alex Timbers, opened on December 12, 2025, at the Nederlander Theatre in New York City on Broadway and closed on March 8, 2026. All Out is Rich's follow up to the 2024 production All In: Comedy About Love.

== Production ==
In February 2025, the creative team announced that a followup to the 2024 production All In: Comedy About Love, originally titled All Out: Comedy About Life, would premiere on Broadway in the 2025–26 season.

All Out was directed by Alex Timbers and produced by Seaview and Lorne Michaels. The show is 85 minutes with no intermission. The production ran for 95 performances, closing on March 8, 2026.

== Cast ==
All Out features a rotating cast of four performers. For 11 members of the cast, this show marked their Broadway debut. Lawrence, an American soul-pop band, performed original music.

Performer Schedule
Name	Dates
Ike Barinholtz	December 12, 2025 - December 20, 2025
Jon Stewart	December 12, 2025 - December, 2025
Eric André	December 12, 2025 - December 28, 2025
Abbi Jacobson	December 12, 2025 - December 28, 2025
Jim Gaffigan	December 22, 2025 - January 11, 2026
Ben Schwartz	December 22, 2026 - January 11, 2026
Wayne Brady	December 29, 2026 - January 18, 2026
Cecily Strong	December 29, 2026 - January 18, 2026
Beck Bennett	January 6, 2026 - January 18, 2026
Mike Birbiglia	January 13, 2026 - January 18, 2026
Sarah Silverman	January 20, 2026 - February 15, 2026
Heidi Gardner	January 20, 2026 - February 15, 2026
Jason Mantzoukas	January 20, 2026 - February 15, 2026
Craig Robinson	January 20, 2026 - February 15, 2026
Ray Romano	February 17, 2026 - March 8, 2026
Nicholas Braun	February 17, 2026 - March 8, 2026
Jake Shane	February 17, 2026 - March 8, 2026
Jenny Slate	February 17, 2026 - March 8, 2026

== See also ==
- All In: Comedy About Love
