= Sam Havadtoy =

American painter

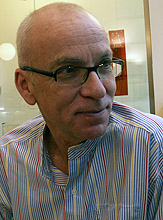
Sam Havadtoy

Sam Havadtoy (born August 4, 1952) is a British-born Hungarian-American interior designer, contemporary painter and owner of Gallery 56.

== Early life ==
Havadtoy was born in London from a Romanian-born ethnic Hungarian father and a Hungarian mother. The family returned to their homeland in the spring of 1956, just before the Hungarian Revolution broke out. After the Revolution it became increasingly difficult for the family to go back to the Western Bloc. It took 14 years for Havadtoy to acquire his British citizenship.

Eventually, in 1971 he fled Hungary, through the former Yugoslavia, back to the United Kingdom, where he met the antique dealer and interior designer Stuart Greet. With Greet's invitation, Havadtoy moved to New York City, where he resided with gaps — e.g. he lived four years in Geneva, Switzerland - from there on until 2000.

== New York ==
In 1978, he founded Samuel Havadtoy Gallery, an interior design gallery where he worked as an interior designer until 1981. Havadtoy designed the interiors of the homes of several notable artists, including John Lennon and Keith Haring.

In 1981, Havadtoy turned to New York's artistic scene, where he became close friends with notable artists such as Haring, Andy Warhol, George Condo, Donald Baechler, and Yoko Ono, with whom Havadtoy had begun a relationship in 1978, becoming her companion for over twenty years until 2001. Havadtoy inspired and contributed to many of Keith Haring's late works, for example in the making of his Altarpiece: The Life of Christ (1990) triptych.

Havadtoy started painting at a young age, just after moving to New York, but acquired his unmistakable style during the 1980s. He mainly uses oil, acrylic, and mixed techniques for his paintings. Havadtoy's works reflect subtle blends of different cultures, mostly Middle European and American popular culture.

== Gallery 56 ==
In the second half of the 80s, due to the gradually dissolving Eastern Bloc, Havadtoy travelled increasingly to Hungary. In 1992, he founded Gallery 56, which became significant in the Hungarian contemporary art scene, among others, by exposing important artists who were considered rarities at the time. The gallery focused mainly on displaying American artists, for example Haring, Warhol, Agnes Martin, Cindy Sherman, Kiki Smith, Robert Mapplethorpe, Ross Bleckner, Donald Sultan, Donald Baechler. Some of the artists also participated personally on the vernissages. Living classics of Hungarian contemporary art were also represented and giant talents such as, László Moholy-Nagy. The name of the gallery comes from Yoko Ono, who alluded to the approaching revolution in the artworld. In 2000, Havadtoy relocated to Europe and is currently living in Hungary and Liguria, Italy.

== Exhibitions ==
- Palazzo Lomellino in Genoa
- Tel Aviv Museum of Art
- Hungarian National Theatre
- Ermanno Tedeschi Gallery in Rome
- Memoart Gallery
- B55 Gallery
- Fondazione Mudima in Milan
