= Murder of Michelle Busha =

American ex-unidentified 1980 murder victim

Michelle Busha
- Born: Michelle Yvette Busha; November 2, 1961
- Disappeared: December 1979; Bay City, Matagorda County, Texas
- Status: Remains identified March 13, 2015
- Died: May 26, 1980 (aged 18)
- Cause of death: Homicide by ligature strangulation
- Body discovered: May 30, 1980 Blue Earth, Faribault County, Minnesota
- Resting place: Riverside Cemetery, Blue Earth, Minnesota (prior to identification)
- Other name: Blue Earth Jane Doe
- Known for: Formerly unidentified homicide victim

Michelle Yvette Busha was a formerly unidentified murder victim discovered in Blue Earth, Minnesota, in 1980. Her murder was solved in 1989, but she remained unidentified for years following the confession of Robert Leroy Nelson, who was a former Minnesota State Trooper. Busha's remains were identified in 2015 after a DNA profile was obtained following the exhumation of her remains.

Busha was reportedly kept in social isolation by her abusive mother and stepfather. After a brief period living as a teenage runaway in Colorado, she returned to her father's family, made friends, and gained employment at a local nursing home. Shortly after her 18th birthday, she joined a group of friends who were heading for Louisiana. She apparently continued her travel by visiting Mississippi and Indiana. She never returned to her mother's home.

Busha was dropped off in Minnesota by an unknown vehicle, and she was offered a ride by an on-duty Minnesota State Trooper. The State Trooper proceeded to rape, beat, torture, and kill her by ligature strangulation. He removed her fingernails while she was still alive, and shaved her head. The killer left her naked body in a ditch, but heavy rains transported her body to a field of corn. Busha's remains were discovered by a local farmer.

== Disappearance ==
Busha and her younger sister were raised and homeschooled by their mother and stepfather. Consequently, the sisters were "highly isolated." Michelle ran away from home when she was 17 due to severe family conflict and abuse from her mother and stepfather. She then ended up in the state of Colorado in July 1979, surrounded by individuals who took advantage of her naivety, drugging and sexually assaulting her. Upon finding out her location, Michelle's father Don Busha Sr. promptly flew to Colorado to bring her back to be with him and family in Bay City, Texas. Michelle spent the next several months in Bay City with her father, stepmother, three of her brothers, and her youngest sister. Her life was improving, as she enjoyed time with family, made friends, and gained employment at a local nursing home. She remained in Bay City until shortly after her 18th birthday.

After Michelle's 18th birthday, on November 2, 1979, she and a group of friends from Bay City decided to travel across the country. She was last seen in December 1979 while she was travelling with friends to Louisiana. She made calls to her family from Mississippi and Indiana between January and May 1980. Michelle would call home to her family in Bay City every one to two weeks and let them know where she was, and what was going on in her life. However, after the calls stopped, her loved ones feared for her safety. On May 9, 1980, she was reported missing.

Michelle's family in Bay City kept the same phone number and address, hoping she would return home or at least contact them again.

== Murder ==
Minnesota State Trooper Robert Leroy Nelson, while on duty, offered Busha a ride on May 26, 1980, after witnessing her being dropped off by a vehicle near the Bricelyn overpass along Interstate 90. He raped, beat, tortured and strangled Busha with a ligature. Her fingernails were removed while she was still alive and her head shaved, except for an area in the back of the head, which was left about an inch long. After her murder, the body was moved to a ditch along Interstate 90 and her clothing and personal items were removed and disposed of.

The decomposed, nude body was discovered about three days to one week after her death. Heavy rains had washed her body into a visible area, where it was discovered by a farmer among broken corn plants. The unidentified victim was estimated to be between the ages of 20 and 35. It appeared she was a transient, as her feet were "heavily calloused." She was 5 ft 3 in (1.60 m) tall and weighed 128 lb (58 kg). Her left ear, at least, had been pierced and she had an overbite.

Near the scene, bloodied clothing and a Texas driver's license were found. The blood was later found to be that of an animal and the license was counterfeit. The body was later buried in the Riverside Cemetery in Blue Earth in an unmarked grave.

== Investigation ==
After Busha was reported missing on May 9, 1980, various efforts were made to locate her. In February 1984, a potential match was noticed with a set of remains discovered in New York. In May 1984, her dental records were compared to that of an unidentified woman, known as the Cheerleader in the Trunk, who was discovered in Maryland in 1982. She was excluded as a potential match in both cases.

The unidentified victim's fingerprints and dental records were compared against missing persons from Colorado and Minnesota but did not line up with any of the potential matches. Fliers describing the case were distributed nationally. Henry Lee Lucas confessed to killing a young woman along Interstate 90 in the area, but when questioned in prison during 1983, he gave details inconsistent with the murder and was excluded as a suspect.

In June 1988, while in police custody in Smith County, Texas, former Minnesota State Trooper Robert Leroy Nelson confessed to murdering the victim while on duty. He claimed he did not know her name, but she apparently was travelling to Idaho or Oregon and she had spent time in the Milwaukee, Wisconsin, area. He admitted to handcuffing her to prevent her escape. Police found his confession credible, as he stated he had removed her fingernails, a fact that had not been released publicly at the time. He pleaded guilty to first-degree manslaughter, while he was already serving two life sentences for rape in Texas. He was sentenced to an additional 86 months on August 25, 1989. Nelson had left Minnesota after becoming involved with a religious cult.

Blue Earth resident Deborah Anderson became intrigued by the case in 2002 and made efforts to bring the murder into the public eye. Anderson met with officials and presented a plan to raise funds for the victim's exhumation, which was eventually scheduled for late July 2014. On August 12, 2014, the body was exhumed for DNA information, which was successfully obtained. The entire process would have cost approximately $10,000, but the exhumation was performed without cost by a local funeral home and construction companies, leaving only the $1,000 cost for the actual DNA testing. In 2004, hairs from the body were examined and a mitochondrial DNA profile (always much less specific than a nuclear DNA profile due to the far lower number of genes contained in mitochondrial DNA) was developed. Authorities had previously taken her dental information and obtained a single fingerprint from the remains to compare against potential matches. Following the exhumation, a new facial reconstruction was created by the National Center for Missing & Exploited Children via an MRI scan. Isotope testing was also performed on a tooth by the Smithsonian Institution to identify regions where the victim may have lived prior to her death. Results from the examination indicated the victim was 17 to 23 years old and was likely white with a possible African admixture.

On March 5, 2015, samples obtained from her family in 2007 were matched to her remains. Dental records were compared as well. The body was officially identified on March 13. The remains were then cremated and released to the Busha family on April 9, 2015.

== See also ==
- List of solved missing person cases
