= Death of Michael Stewart =

Death of an american graffiti artist

- Location: First Avenue station, New York City Subway
- Date: September 15, 1983; 2:50 a.m.
- Target: Michael Stewart
- Attack type: Alleged police brutality
- Deaths: 1
- Victim: Michael Stewart
- Perpetrator: New York City Transit Police officers
- Motive: Alleged excessive force during arrest. Disputed accounts exist regarding Stewart's behavior.
- Inquiries: Grand jury investigations internal police investigations
- Coroner: Elliot M. Gross (disputed findings)
- Charges: Criminally negligent homicide, assault, perjury
- Verdict: Not guilty
- Convictions: None
- Litigation: Civil lawsuit settled for $1.7 million
- Judge: George F. Roberts

Michael Jerome Stewart (May 9, 1958 – September 28, 1983) was an African-American man arrested by New York City Transit Police officers for writing graffiti in soft-tip marker or using an aerosol can on a New York City Subway wall at the First Avenue station. His treatment while in police custody and the ensuing trials of the arresting officers (all of whom were acquitted) sparked debate concerning police brutality and the responsibilities of arresting officials in handling suspects.

Word of the arrest came out on September 15, 1983, as the Committee Against Racially Motivated Police Violence was holding a news conference to publicize a United States Congress hearing into complaints of police abuse. Stewart had been arrested earlier that day. He died at age 25, on September 28, after 13 days in a coma. The cause of death was listed as cardiac arrest.

== Arrest and death ==
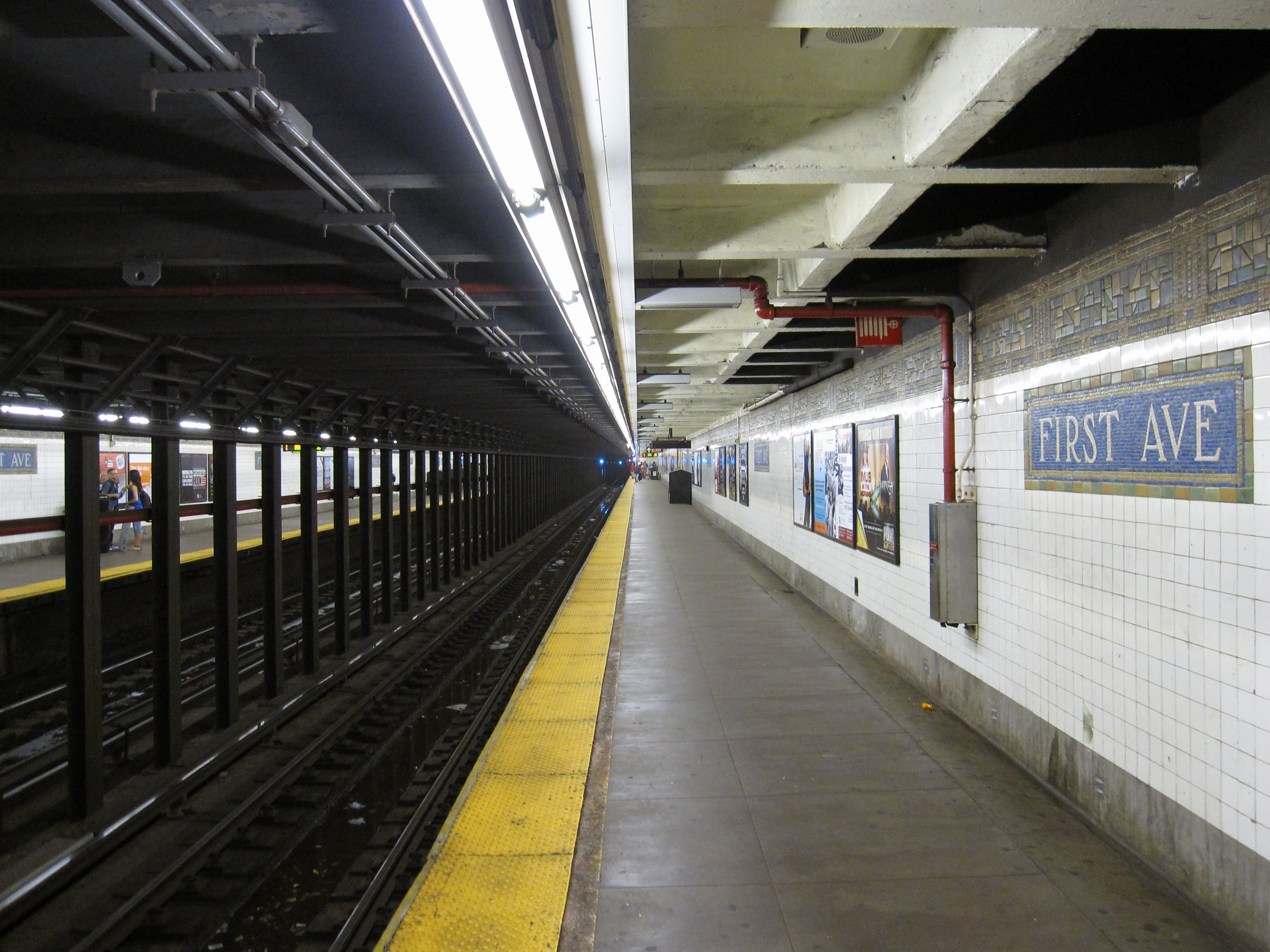
Michael Stewart was spraying graffiti at the First Avenue station (pictured) when he was arrested.

On September 15, 1983, aspiring artist and model Michael Stewart left the Pyramid Club in Manhattan's Lower East Side after 2 a.m. He left the club with a friend, and shared a cab to the nearest subway station at 14th Street and 1st Avenue. At the station, a gate agent stated that Stewart hopped the turnstile and did not pay the subway fare. He was arrested at 2:50 a.m. for spraying graffiti at the First Avenue station on the L train's Brooklyn-bound platform. Transit Police Officer John Kostick found Stewart scrawling "RQS" on the wall and had him arrested. Stewart allegedly said, "Hey, man, you got me." Kostick cuffed Stewart and walked him to the turnstile to be identified. As Stewart was still living with his parents, he asked the police not to call his home to wake them up. Officer Kostick claimed Stewart was initially cordial, but suddenly ran off and had to be restrained while waiting for the arrest transport van. "At the top [of the stairs], Stewart fell face-forward on the ground," said Kostick. The officer held Stewart to the ground until the van arrived, where several officers put him inside; witnesses stated that eleven police officers, all of whom were white, assisted in Stewart's arrest. Stewart was taken to the District 4 Transit Police station at 14th Street–Union Square, two stops away.

While being taken to the station, Kostick said, Stewart became "very violent" in the van. Stewart struggled with the officers and ran to the street. He was beaten unconscious. He was hogtied, bound at the ankles and tethered hands-to-feet by an elastic strap. During the struggle, Stewart's wails could be heard by 27 Parsons School of Design students from their dorm windows. A Parsons student, Rebecca Reiss, heard Stewart say "Oh my God, someone help me", and "What did I do? What did I do?" Rob Zombie, also a Parsons student at the time, recounted the incident in 2019 during an appearance on the September 16 episode of The Joe Rogan Experience podcast (#1353). He stated that he and the other witnesses that night were subpoenaed to testify before a grand jury prior to the trial. Stewart was booked at the Union Square District 4 transit police headquarters for resisting arrest and unlawful possession of marijuana. The transit police supervisors deemed Stewart emotionally disturbed. Stewart was placed back into the van and transported to Bellevue Hospital to undergo psychiatric observation. Stewart arrived at Bellevue at 3:22 a.m. He was handcuffed, his legs were bound, and he was comatose with a blood alcohol content of 0.22, more than double the 0.10 threshold needed to arrest someone for drunk driving. Stewart was dating Suzanne Mallouk at the time, and she went with his family to see him at the hospital. According to Mallouk's account, Stewart had bruises and cuts on his body. She said the doctors confirmed he was brain dead and had hemorrhaged in a way that suggested he had either been choked or strangled. Stewart died on September 28, 1983, thirteen days after his arrest.

== Aftermath ==
=== Postmortem examination ===
In charge of determining Stewart's cause of death was the city's medical examiner, Dr. Elliot M. Gross. Gross had three separate findings. He first declared Stewart had died due to excessive drinking, alcohol poisoning, which led to the coma and subsequent heart attack; thus, the police were not at fault. Stewart's family and advocates were unconvinced and believed this was a "classic cover-up."

In a second autopsy conducted a month later, Gross declared that Stewart had died from a spinal cord injury in the upper neck. In his third assessment he said that Stewart died from blunt-force trauma. According to The New York Times, "Gross declined to specify what caused the injury, explaining only that 'there are a number of possibilities as to how an injury of these type can occur.' He refused to talk to press unless testifying before the grand jury."

Gross said Stewart's injuries, including the facial bruising and the abrasions on his wrists sustained during his arrest, were not said to contribute to his death. Nurses said his hands and face were blue when he arrived at the hospital, and that it took 3 minutes to remove the cuffs. They also said that he had been beaten brutally.

Doctors hired by Stewart's family to perform a secondary autopsy contradicted the findings in the final autopsy report done by Gross, finding that the cause of death was strangulation. Gross said there was no evidence of strangulation. Stewart's eyes were not provided for examination by the doctors hired by Stewart's family. The eyes were crucial because they would have shown evidence of hemorrhaging due to lack of oxygen from being strangled. Claims of Gross's incompetence led the Stewart family to call for a petition to remove him as chief medical examiner claiming alleged wrongdoing and the medical examiners office cannot be trusted with the safekeeping of items. Dr. Gross was fired in 1987.

=== Grand jury investigation and trials ===
A grand jury investigation was initiated in October 1983 to determine what happened to Stewart in the 32 minutes between being arrested and his delivery to the hospital. On October 19, about twenty black community leaders, including City Councilwoman Mary Pinkett, protested outside the Manhattan District Attorney Robert M. Morgenthau's office at the Criminal Court Building. Morgenthau refused to see the group, stating that it would be inappropriate to comment before the case went to the grand jury in November 1983. The medical examiner's final report, issued on November 2, differed from his preliminary report. Gross declined to state explicitly what caused the death, but reported that Stewart died of "physical injury to the spinal cord in the upper neck" and concluded that there were "a number of possibilities as to how an injury of this type can occur".

During the five-month trial in the New York Supreme Court, some witnesses testified that Stewart was struck and kicked by officers, while other witnesses said they did not see officers beat Stewart. Annemarie Crocetti testified she heard and witnessed abuse of Stewart from the police from her Union Square apartment. None were able to determine who was responsible for handling Stewart, and none were able to identify which officers took which actions at the arrest. Experts could not agree on what combination of injuries, intoxication, and cardiac health issues ended Stewart's life. Seven months into the grand jury investigation, the case was dismissed because a juror, Ronald P. Fields, initiated private investigations on the case.

In February 1984, a second grand jury introduced the case before Justice George F. Roberts which indicted three officers, John Kostick, Anthony Piscola and Henry Boerner, with criminally negligent homicide, assault and perjury. Three other officers, Sgt. Henry Hassler, Sgt. James Barry and Susan Techky, who denied that they saw officers kick Stewart, were charged with perjury. In June 1985, jury selection began in State Supreme Court in Manhattan for the trial.

Prosecutor Morgenthau went to the second trial with two theories, one of neck injury leading to the death and the other that beatings caused cardiac arrest. Prosecutors pushed for second degree manslaughter to be charged if it was determined the officers recklessly caused the death. The jury was instructed that to support a charge of criminally negligent homicide, they had to find that the officers failed to take reasonable steps to prevent death. The prosecution hoped to establish a law requiring officers to "have an affirmative duty to protect prisoners in their custody from abuse".

William McKechnie, of the Transit Patrolman's Benevolent Association, denied the officers' role in the death stating, "If someone dies of a heart attack, we are not doctors". The New York Civil Liberties Union believed the second set of indictments signaled a new direction in how prosecutors treat police abuse cases. Richard Emery, a lawyer for the New York Civil Liberties Union, stated, "The theory underlining this case is perhaps the most important development in stemming the tide of police abuse. It makes police officers strictly responsible for their prisoners. It holds them accountable." On November 24, 1985, the six officers were acquitted by an all-white jury.

In 1987, the Stewart family brought $40-million civil lawsuit against the eleven officers and the MTA. Consequently, hundreds of off-duty transit police officers marched along Madison Avenue in front of the MTA's headquarters carrying signs reading "End the witch hunt" and "When are we finally innocent?" In August 1990, Stewart's parents and his siblings John and Lisha Cole Stewart settled the civil lawsuit out of court for $1.7 million. Neither the police nor city officials took responsibility for the death of Michael Stewart.

== Reactions ==
Stewart's family called his death an act of racism and brutality. Attorneys representing the Stewart family described Michael as "a retiring and almost docile 135-pound young artist and a Pratt Institute student" who was on his way home to the Clinton Hill, Brooklyn, neighborhood where he lived with his mother, Carrie, and father, Millard, who was a retired Metropolitan Transit Authority maintenance worker. They maintained that the white officers had beaten a black artist and model. It stirred public protests by black activists and others, believing that city officials were covering up for the transit police.

In 1984, Franck Lazare Goldberg directed a short documentary titled Who Killed Michael Stewart? about the killing.

In March 1987, the MTA determined that only one officer, John Kostick, was subject to suspension based on departmental charges of perjury. The MTA Board approved additional training for transit officers in the handling of emotionally disturbed people and changed its policies on how the department's internal affairs unit becomes involved with cases of possible misconduct.

In 2025, The Man Nobody Killed: Life, Death, and Art in Michael Stewart's New York, by Elon Green was published. New York Times critic James Lasdun said the book "...is part elegy for Stewart himself, part portrait of the city that failed him. It avoids drawing explicit parallels with our own time, but then it hardly needs to."

=== Tributes ===
- The death of Radio Raheem by a police choke-hold in Spike Lee's 1989 film Do the Right Thing is inspired by Michael Stewart's arrest, as confirmed by Lee on The Tonight Show Starring Jimmy Fallon. The film is dedicated to the families of Michael Stewart and other victims of police violence in New York.
- In the song "Graffiti Limbo" penned by songwriter Michelle Shocked on her Short Sharp Shocked release, an extra verse she sings live is not on the album: "You see in order to determine that Michael Stewart was strangled to death / The coroner had to use Michael Stewart's eyeballs, his eyes, as evidence, / So now when I tell you it was Michael Stewart's eyes that the coroner lost / Do you know what I mean when I say that justice is blind."
- "Hold On" from Lou Reed's album New York contains the following line: "The dopers sent a message to the cops last weekend they shot him in the car where he sat. And Eleanor Bumpurs and Michael Stewart must have appreciated that."
- Artist Jean-Michel Basquiat created Defacement (The Death of Michael Stewart) as a response to his death.
- Stewart's girlfriend Suzanne Mallouk informed SoHo art galleries and the downtown New York City nightclubs such as the Berlin and the Pyramid Club where they both worked to help raise financial support and awareness of Stewart's death. Keith Haring donated money and Madonna performed at a benefit at Danceteria.
- For his 1985 show at Tony Shafrazi gallery Keith Haring did a painting about Stewart's death, titled Michael Stewart – USA for Africa. It depicts a black man being strangled while handcuffed to a skeleton holding a key. People from all nations drown in a river of blood below, while others shield their eyes from the scene, and the green hand of big money oversees the scene.
- In his 1987 film Police State, Nick Zedd makes reference to Michael Stewart in a scene depicting a conversation between a cop and a young man, leading to an unlawful arrest. The film was a black comedy about police brutality, inspired in part by the Michael Stewart case and Operation Pressure Point, an operation designed to "clean up" and gentrify the Lower East Side of NYC.
- In 2019, Chaédria LaBouvier curated a solo exhibition at the Guggenheim which included the painting by Basquiat. In addition to the painting, the history and story behind Stewart's death was examined.
