= Killing of Eleanor Bumpurs =

1984 shooting death of an African-American woman by NYPD

- Bumpurs, c. 1984.
- Date: October 29, 1984; 42 years ago
- Location: 1551 University Avenue Morris Heights, Bronx, New York, U.S.; 40.848301°N 73.918625°W
- Cause: Police brutality
- Deaths: Eleanor Bumpurs
- Accused: NYPD officer Stephen Sullivan
- Charges: Second-degree manslaughter
- Convictions: None
- Litigation: Bumpurs' family filed a lawsuit against New York City, settled for $200,000 (1990)

On October 29, 1984, Eleanor Bumpurs was shot and killed by the New York City Police Department (NYPD). The police were present to enforce a city-ordered eviction of Bumpurs, an elderly and disabled African American woman, from her New York Housing Authority (NYCHA) public housing unit at 1551 University Avenue (Sedgwick Houses) in the Morris Heights neighborhood of the Bronx.

In requesting NYPD assistance, NYCHA workers told police that Bumpurs was emotionally disturbed, had threatened to throw boiling lye and was using a knife to resist eviction. When Bumpurs refused to open the door, police broke into her unit. In the struggle to subdue her, one officer fatally shot Bumpurs twice with a 12-gauge shotgun.

Bumpurs' shooting, one of several deaths that inflamed racial tensions in New York during the 1980s, led to changes within the NYPD regarding responses to disabled and emotionally volatile persons. Officer Stephen Sullivan, who shot Bumpurs, was indicted on a charge of second-degree manslaughter, but was ultimately acquitted. Bumpurs' family sued the city for $10 million in damages, and settled for $200,000.

== Incident ==
Prior to the eviction attempt, Bumpurs, who had arthritis and other health problems, had told her daughter Mary that someone in the building was harassing her. Mary advised her to keep the door locked. Bumpurs told a housing authority official she would not pay the rent because she was having maintenance problems, but refused to admit maintenance workers to her apartment when they were sent. In one phone conversation, she told a housing-authority manager she would not pay the rent because "people had come through the windows, the walls and the floors and had ripped her off". When maintenance workers were admitted to the apartment on October 12, they checked a hallway light and stove as requested, finding no problems with them, but found several cans of human feces in the bathtub. Bumpurs blamed these on "Reagan and his people". Four days before the eviction attempt, the city sent a psychiatrist to visit Bumpurs. He concluded that Bumpurs was "psychotic" and "unable to manage her affairs properly" and should be hospitalized. A Social Services supervisor decided that the best way to help Bumpurs was to evict her first, then hospitalize her.

On the morning of October 29, 1984, Bumpurs told housing authority workers who had come to evict her that she would throw boiling lye at the next face to appear. The NYPD Emergency Service Unit, specially trained in subduing emotionally disturbed people was summoned, but was unable to get Bumpurs to come to the door. They drilled out the lock, and through the hole they could see the naked 66-year-old in her living room, holding a 10-inch kitchen knife. The officers then knocked down the door and entered. They attempted to restrain Bumpurs with plastic shields and a special Y-shaped bar, but she fought free. Officer Stephen Sullivan fired two shots from his 12-gauge pump action shotgun. One pellet from the first shot struck Bumpurs' hand; all nine pellets from the second shot struck her in the chest, killing her.

== Aftermath ==
=== Reactions ===
The case brought much notice: the victim was black, a senior citizen, and mentally ill. Some observers claimed that the fact that two shots had been fired also raised questions. To meet the criticism of the public, the PBA aired radio and print advertisements asserting that Bumpurs was a severe threat to the officers in the apartment: "This 300-pound woman suddenly charged one of the officers with a 12-inch butcher knife, striking his shield with such force that it bent the tip of the steel blade." There followed the development of a new, special program to train police officers in New York State to work safely and effectively with "Emotionally Disturbed People (EDPs)". Employees of the NY State Department of Mental Health, along with those of the NYPD and NY State Police were trained as trainers. The new, mandatory course was delivered at the NYPD and State Police Training Academies, and to officers already in service. The program was delivered by training teams composed of police and mental health employees. It was an attempt to address the problem of safely controlling potentially dangerous situations.

=== Legal proceedings ===
A grand jury was convened to investigate Sullivan's actions. On January 30, 1985, the grand jury indicted Sullivan on charges of second-degree manslaughter, to which Sullivan pleaded not guilty. However, on April 12, Judge Vincent A. Vitale of State Supreme Court dismissed the indictment, ruling that under the New York State Penal Code "the evidence before the grand jury was legally insufficient to support the offense charged or any lesser included offense", and that Sullivan's "acts were in conformity with the guidelines and procedures outlined" in the NYPD's Emergency Service Unit manual. The case took another turn on appeal when, on November 25, 1986, the New York Court of Appeals reinstated Sullivan's second-degree manslaughter indictment by a 6–1 vote. Chief Justice Sol Wachtler was the lone dissenter, saying that the evidence warranted more serious charges.

=== Trial of Officer Sullivan ===
Sullivan waived his right to a jury trial, choosing a bench trial before a judge only. The trial opened on January 12, 1987, over two years after Bumpurs' death. The trial hinged on whether Sullivan had used excessive force, especially in firing twice at Bumpurs. His fellow officers testified that Bumpurs was still not immobilized after the first blast hit her hand, and therefore still posed a threat to the police. In addition, two plastic surgeons testifying as expert witnesses for the defense said that Bumpurs could have continued to slash at the officers trying to subdue her even after her hand had been injured by the first shotgun blast. By contrast, the emergency room physician who treated Bumpurs immediately after the shooting stood by his grand jury testimony that her hand was left "a bloody stump" by the first shot. On February 26, 1987 Judge Fred W. Eggert acquitted Sullivan on the charges of manslaughter. On August 4, 1987 federal prosecutors declined to investigate the Bumpurs case. Rudy Giuliani, who was the U.S. Attorney in Manhattan at the time, stated that he had found "nothing indicating that the case was not tried fully, fairly and competently", and that there was no "proof of a specific intent to inflict excessive and unjustified force."

=== Civil suit and Social services demotions ===
The Bumpurs family filed a civil suit against the city for $10 million in damages. In March 1990, the city agreed to pay $200,000 to the Bumpurs estate, marking a close to the legal proceedings stemming from the shooting. Two supervisors in the city's Social Services administration were later demoted for failing to seek an emergency rent grant for Bumpurs and for not getting her proper psychiatric aid.

== Legacy ==
The Bumpurs case was one of several cases in New York during the 1980s that exacerbated racial tensions. Others were the fatal assault on Willie Turks in 1982, the 1983 arrest and death of Michael Stewart while in police custody, the subway shooting of four men by Bernhard Goetz in 1984, the fatal assault on Michael Griffith in 1986, the shooting of six NYPD officers by Larry Davis also in 1986, and the murder of Yusef Hawkins in 1989. Since shortly after Bumpurs' death, members of the NYPD Emergency Service Unit have carried Tasers, weapons that can deliver thousands of volts of incapacitating electric current, as an alternative to the use of firearms when dealing with the mentally ill.

"Hold On" from Lou Reed's 1989 album New York contains the following line: "The dopers sent a message to the cops last weekend they shot him in the car where he sat. And Eleanor Bumpurs and Michael Stewart must have appreciated that."

Spike Lee dedicated the 1989 film Do the Right Thing to the families of Eleanor Bumpurs and other victims.

Audre Lorde dedicated a poem to the memory of Eleanor Bumpers titled For the Record.

== See also ==
- Killing of Gidone Busch
