= All In: Comedy About Love =

2024 play by Simon Rich

- Original language: English
- Written by: Simon Rich
- Subject: Love, Romance
- Genre: Comedy

Premiere
- Date: December 22, 2024
- Directed by: Alex Timbers
- Official website

All In: Comedy About Love is a show from Simon Rich which consists of live readings of previously published short stories from The New Yorker. The first production, directed by Alex Timbers and produced by Lorne Michaels, began previews on December 11, 2024, at the Hudson Theater in New York City on Broadway; before opening on December 22, 2024. The original Broadway cast includes John Mulaney, Renee Elise Goldsberry, Fred Armisen, and Richard Kind, with music by the Magnetic Fields.

== Summary ==
The show consists of live readings of seven of Simon Rich's previously published short stories.

Title	Date published	Original publication
"Guy Walks Into a Bar"	November 10, 2013	The New Yorker
"Dog Missed Connections"	January 22, 2013	The Last Girlfriend on Earth book
"Learning the Ropes"	February 28, 2020	The New Yorker
"Case Study"	July 27, 2021	New Teeth book
"The Big Nap"	July 6, 2021	The New Yorker
"New Client"	July 24, 2018	Hits & Misses book
"History Report"	August 29, 2022	The New Yorker

== Cast ==
The original cast starred John Mulaney, Renee Elise Goldsberry, Fred Armisen, and Richard Kind.

The rotating cast lists as follows:

Name	Dates
John Mulaney	December 11, 2024 – January 12, 2025
Renée Elise Goldsberry	December 11, 2024 – December 29, 2024
Fred Armisen	December 11, 2024 – January 12, 2025
Richard Kind	December 11, 2024 – January 12, 2025
Chloe Fineman	December 30, 2024 – January 12, 2025
Lin-Manuel Miranda	January 14, 2025 – February 16, 2025
Aidy Bryant	January 14, 2025 – February 2, 2025
Nick Kroll	January 14, 2025 – February 2, 2025
Andrew Rannells	January 14, 2025 – January 26, 2025
Jimmy Fallon	January 28, 2025 – February 2, 2025
Annaleigh Ashford	February 4, 2025 – February 16, 2025
Tim Meadows	February 4, 2025 – February 16, 2025
David Cross	February 4, 2025 – February 11, 2025
Hank Azaria	February 11, 2025 – February 16, 2025

== Production ==
In September 2024, it was announced that John Mulaney would be starring in a comedic show entitled All In: Comedy About Love written by Simon Rich. The show would feature a rotating cast of four actors for 10 weeks with performances starting December 11, 2024. The original cast consisted of Mulaney, Renee Elise Goldsberry, Fred Armisen, and Richard Kind. Chloe Fineman was added, replacing Goldsberry as part of the original cast. On September 23, 2024, the rotating cast was announced as being Lin-Manuel Miranda, Nick Kroll, Andrew Rannells, Jimmy Fallon, Aidy Bryant, David Cross, Tim Meadows, and Hank Azaria. On October 1, 2024, Annaleigh Ashford was announced as joining the cast.

The show also included songs from the indie pop band the Magnetic Fields from their album 69 Love Songs. The show was described as featuring a series of humorous stories about dating, heartbreak, marriage and more, adapted from short stories by Rich that had previously appeared in The New Yorker. The press release said: "Sometimes they will play pirates, sometimes they will play dogs, and there's one where we make them talk in British accents. But even though the show's kind of all over the place, it's meant to tell one simple story: that the most important part of life is who we share it with." Alex Timbers was announced as the shows director with Lorne Michaels producing.

In early 2025, it was announced that All In had recouped its Broadway capitalization, and that the creative team would create a companion piece for the 2025-26 Broadway season. All Out: Comedy About Ambition, the sequel production, ran from December 12, 2025 to March 8, 2025.

== Marketing confusion ==
Sara Holden of Vulture wrote about the show's marketing, which confused audience members who expected a play with actors performing the short stories and not a live reading of the short stories. Holden explained, "it's not a good sign when your Broadway show has more than one Reddit thread asking if it's a scam", saying that "it's an expensive staged reading with a rotating cast of celebrities". She added: "The show's marketing team has been careful about their wording: All In, says its website, is 'a series of hilarious short stories ... read by some of the funniest people on the planet.'" Greg Evans of Deadline Hollywood said the show was a "strange beast" on Broadway and noted, "judging by some audience reviews on various websites, there is indeed confusion – All In is a series of story readings, or performed readings rather", noting that the production consisted of the actors sitting in armchairs reading from scripts.

== Critical reception ==
All In received mixed reviews with critics with some critics praising its airy comedic quality and A-list cast while others criticized its slight material. Greg Evans of Deadline Hollywood wrote favorably about the production, comparing it to that of a "perfect holiday snickerdoodle, a light and tasty snack no less funny for its brevity and lack of splashy production values". Adam Feldman of Time Out concurred, describing the show was a "live reading" and writing: "All In may not be a full dramatic meal, but it's a tasty treat for the run-up to Valentine's Day, sweet and tart as a candy heart." Feldman praised Mulaney and Kind as being "masterful" and compared the stories to that of Woody Allen's work.

Elizabeth Vincentelli of The New York Times wrote: "It all adds up to a pleasantly innocuous evening, but it's also hard not to think that we're watching a bunch of Formula 1 cars being throttled at 25 mph." In his mixed review, Pete Hemstead of Theatermania wrote that despite the fact that he was "smiling throughout", "All In feels like a joke that goes on for too long and it doesn't have the knee-slapping payoff to make it worth 90 minutes of your time". Johnny Olenski of The New York Post wrote a negative review, declaring the show "a big waste of money". He added: "Each cutesy bit is more self-satisfied and twee than the next. And the entire night has the low boil of a long-winded intro that builds to nothing."

== See also ==
- All Out: Comedy About Ambition
