= Losing Earth =

2019 climate change book by Nathaniel Rich

Losing Earth: A Recent History
- First edition
- Author: Nathaniel Rich
- Language: English
- Genre: Non-fiction
- Publisher: MCD/Farrar
- Publication date: April 9, 2019
- Publication place: United States
- Pages: 224
- ISBN: 978-0-374-19133-7

Losing Earth: A Recent History (published as Losing Earth: The Decade We Could Have Stopped Climate Change in the UK and Commonwealth markets) is a 2019 book written by Nathaniel Rich. The book is about the existence of scientific evidence for climate change for decades while it was politically denied, and the eventual damage that will occur as a result. It focuses on the years 1979 to 1989 and US-based scientists, activists, and policymakers including James Hansen, Rafe Pomerance, and Jule Gregory Charney.

The story was first published as the August 5, 2018, issue of The New York Times Magazine and later expanded. After the article was published, it was announced that the story was in development to be converted into a docuseries that will be distributed on Apple TV+. A feature length adaptation titled A Statement, co-written and directed by Tom McCarthy for Sony Pictures Classics, premiered at the 2026 New York Film Festival.

== Responses ==
=== Initial version of text ===
Environmentalists including May Boeve criticized the narrative for promoting climate doom and focusing on a small group that they argue is not representative of the broader climate movement. Leah Stokes and others have questioned Rich's framing of who is to blame for the climate crisis; Rich did not emphasize the culpability of the fossil fuel industry or of politicians.

=== Expanded version of text ===
In Bookforum, Roy Scranton wrote that "the book is substantially the same as the article" and pointed out its lack of citations. The book received a starred review in Booklist, where it was called "a must-read handbook for everyone concerned about our planet’s future." A review in NPR likened it to "a Greek tragedy." In Nature, Barbara Kiser called it "An eloquent science history, and an urgent eleventh-hour call to save what can be saved."

Losing Earth was published in more than a dozen languages and was named a finalist for the 2020 PEN/E.O. Wilson Literary Science Writing Award.

== See also ==
- Merchants of Doubt
- Noordwijk Climate Conference
- Politics of global warming
- Scientific consensus on climate change
