= Nathaniel Rich (novelist) =

American writer (born 1980)

- Rich in 2026
- Born: March 5, 1980 (age 46); New York City, U.S.
- Education: Yale University
- Occupation: Writer
- Spouse: Meredith Angelson (m. 2014)
- Children: 2
- Relatives: Frank Rich (father); Simon Rich (brother)
- Writing career
- Language: English
- Period: 2005–present
- Genres: Novel; essay
- Website: nathanielrich.com

Nathaniel Rich (born March 5, 1980) is an American novelist and essayist. Rich is the author of several books, both fiction and non-fiction. He was an editor for The Paris Review, and has contributed articles and essays to several major magazines, including The Atlantic, Harper's Magazine, and The New York Review of Books.

== Early life ==
Rich is the son of Frank Rich, New York Magazine writer and former New York Times columnist, and Gail Winston, executive editor at HarperCollins. His youngest brother is writer Simon Rich. Rich attended Dalton School and is an alumnus of Yale University, where he studied literature.

After graduating, he worked on the editorial staff of The New York Review of Books.

== Career ==
Rich moved to San Francisco to write San Francisco Noir, exploring how the city has been portrayed in film noir. The San Francisco Chronicle ranked it as one of the best books of 2005. That year he was hired as an editor by The Paris Review. Since then he has written and published both non-fiction and fiction books.

In 2008, he published his debut novel The Mayor's Tongue, described by Carolyn See in The Washington Post as a "playful, highly intellectual novel about serious subjects – the failure of language, for one, and how we cope with that failure in order to keep ourselves sane".

In 2013 he published Odds Against Tomorrow, which NPR's Alan Cheuse described as a "brilliantly conceived and extremely well-executed novel ... a knockout of a book." Cathleen Schine wrote, in the New York Review of Books, "Let's just, right away, recognize how prescient this charming, terrifying, comic novel of apocalyptic manners is ... Rich is a gifted caricaturist and a gifted apocalyptist. His descriptions of the vagaries of both nature and human nature are stark, fresh, and convincing, full of surprise and recognition as both good comedy and good terror must be."

In 2018 Rich published the novel King Zeno, a New York Times Book Review Editors' Choice, praised by NPR, Vanity Fair, and the San Francisco Chronicle, among other publications. "A groaning board of tasty literary treats," wrote The Washington Post. "King Zeno offers a gritty, panoramic portrait of the Big Easy."

On August 1, 2018, The New York Times Magazine devoted its entire issue to a single article by Rich titled "Losing Earth: The Decade We Almost Stopped Climate Change." The article was described by the editor, Jake Silverstein, as "a work of history, addressing the 10-year period from 1979 to 1989: the decisive decade when humankind first came to a broad understanding of the causes and dangers of climate change." "Losing Earth" won national awards from the Society of Environmental Journalists and the American Institute of Physics, and was expanded into the book Losing Earth: A Recent History, published in 2019. The book was published in more than a dozen languages and was a finalist for the PEN/E. O. Wilson Literary Science Writing Award.

Second Nature: Scenes From a World Remade, a collection of stories on environmental themes, was published in 2021, and longlisted for the PEN/E. O. Wilson Literary Science Writing Award. The opening chapter, "Dark Waters," drawn from Rich's 2016 New York Times Magazine article "The Lawyer Who Became DuPont's Worst Nightmare," was adapted into the film Dark Waters, starring Mark Ruffalo.

Rich is a contributing writer for New York Times Magazine and a regular contributor to The New York Review of Books, The Atlantic, and Harper's.

== Personal life ==
Rich lives in New Orleans with his wife, Meredith Angelson, and their sons.

== Works ==
=== Fiction ===
- The Mayor's Tongue. Riverhead Books. 2008. ISBN 978-1594489907.
- Odds Against Tomorrow. Farrar, Straus and Giroux. 2013. ISBN 978-0374224240.
- King Zeno. Farrar, Straus and Giroux. 2018 ISBN 9780374181314.
- Cloudthief. MacMillan Publishers. 2026 ISBN 9780374619794.

=== Nonfiction ===
- San Francisco Noir: The City in Film Noir from 1940 to the Present. The Little Bookroom. 2005. ISBN 978-1892145307.
- "The Lawyer Who Became DuPont's Worst Nightmare", for The New York Times (2016). This feature article was adapted as the film Dark Waters (2019), directed by Todd Haynes and starring Mark Ruffalo.
- Losing Earth: A Recent History. Farrar, Straus and Giroux: MCD. 2019. ISBN 9780374191337.
- Second Nature: Scenes from a World Remade. Farrar, Straus and Giroux: MCD. 2021. ISBN 0374106037.
