= Larkin Seiple =

American cinematographer (born 1985)

- Born: 1985 (age 40–41); Seattle, Washington, United States
- Occupation: Cinematographer
- Years active: 2010–present

Larkin Seiple (born 1985) is an American cinematographer, known mostly for independent and low-budget projects.

He has also worked on several music videos with artists like Childish Gambino, David Guetta, Lenny Kravitz, Shawn Mendes, Katy Perry, and Rihanna, and with bands such as Disturbed, Foster the People, Massive Attack, My Chemical Romance, Owl City, and Queens of the Stone Age.

== Early life ==
Seiple grew up in Seattle, Washington, attending high school at Seattle Academy of Arts and Sciences, and later attended Emerson College.

== Awards ==
Seiple won the 2015 MTV Video Music Award for Best Cinematography for "Never Catch Me" by Flying Lotus.

== Filmography ==
=== Film ===
| Year | Title | Director | Notes |
|---|---|---|---|
| 2010 | Consinsual | Paul D. Hannah | |
| 2015 | Cop Car | Jon Watts | With Matthew J. Lloyd |
| 2016 | Swiss Army Man | Daniel Kwan; Daniel Scheinert | |
| 2016 | Bleed for This | Ben Younger | |
| 2017 | I Don't Feel at Home in This World Anymore | Macon Blair | |
| 2018 | Kin | Jonathan Baker; Josh Baker | |
| 2019 | Luce | Julius Onah | |
| 2022 | Everything Everywhere All at Once | Daniel Kwan; Daniel Scheinert | |
| 2022 | To Leslie | Michael Morris | |
| 2024 | Wolfs | Jon Watts | |
| 2025 | Weapons | Zach Cregger | |

=== Television ===
| Year | Title | Director | Notes |
|---|---|---|---|
| 2008 | Downers Grove | Bob Walles | All 9 episodes |
| 2010 | Remember When | Sam Molleur | 1 episode |
| 2022 | Gaslit | Matt Ross | Miniseries |
| 2023 | Beef | Jake Schreier; Hikari; Lee Sung Jin | 10 episodes |

=== Music video ===
| Year | Title | Artist | Director | Source |
|---|---|---|---|---|
| 2009 | "Wicked Blood" | Sea Wolf | Alan Tanner | |
| 2009 | "Cracks in the Armor" | Killola | Hank Friedmann | |
| 2010 | "Breathturn" | Hammock | David Altobelli | |
| 2010 | "Another Way to Die" | Disturbed | Roboshobo | |
| 2010 | "Asylum" | Disturbed | Roboshobo | |
| 2010 | "Walking the Dog" | fun. | SKINNY | |
| 2010 | "By Some Miracle" | Philip Selway | David Altobelli | |
| 2010 | "New Low" | Middle Class Rut | Lance Drake | |
| 2010 | "Na Na Na (Na Na Na Na Na Na Na Na Na)" | My Chemical Romance | Roboshobo & Gerard Way | |
| 2010 | "Flying Overseas" | Theophilus London | Tim Nackashi | |
| 2010 | "We'll Be a Dream" | We the Kings | Raúl B. Fernández | |
| 2010 | "Lovesick" | Emily Osment | Daniel 'Cloud' Campos | |
| 2010 | "I'm in Here" | Sia | David Altobelli | |
| 2011 | "Touchin' on My" | 3OH!3 | Isaac Ravishankara | |
| 2011 | "Beautiful Girl" | William Fitzsimmons | AG Rojas | |
| 2011 | "Jubilation Day" | Steve Martin and the Steep Canyon Rangers | Ryan Reichenfeld | |
| 2011 | "Losers" | The Belle Brigade | David Altobelli | |
| 2011 | "Alligator Sky" | Owl City | Steve Hoover | |
| 2011 | "Misfits" | Travis Barker | AG Rojas | |
| 2011 | "Abducted" | Cults | David Altobelli | |
| 2011 | "Got to Lose" | Hollerado | Greg Jardin | |
| 2011 | "Stand" | Lenny Kravitz | Paul Hunter | |
| 2011 | "Helena Beat" | Foster the People | Ace Norton | |
| 2011 | "Stereo Hearts" | Gym Class Heroes | Hiro Murai | |
| 2011 | "When the Night Falls" | Chromeo | Daniel Kwan; Daniel Scheinert | |
| 2011 | "Holocene" | Bon Iver | Nabil | |
| 2011 | "Show Me" | Jessica Sutta | SKINNY | |
| 2011 | "Take It or Leave It" | Sublime with Rome | Lance Drake | |
| 2011 | "The Keeper" | Chris Cornell | Isaac Rentz | |
| 2011 | "Free My Mind" | Katie Herzig | Hung Shih-ting | |
| 2011 | "The One That Got Away" | Katy Perry | Floria Sigismondi | |
| 2011 | "Titanium" | David Guetta | David Wilson | |
| 2011 | "My Machines" | Battles | Daniel Kwan; Daniel Scheinert | |
| 2011 | "Don't Stop (Color on the Walls)" | Foster the People | Daniel Kwan; Daniel Scheinert | |
| 2012 | "Simple Song" | The Shins | Daniel Kwan; Daniel Scheinert | |
| 2012 | "Shady Love" | Scissor Sisters vs Krystal Pepsy | Hiro Murai | |
| 2012 | "Cheerleader" | St. Vincent | Hiro Murai | |
| 2012 | "Towers" | Bon Iver | Nabil | |
| 2012 | "Iconic" | Moonbootica | SKINNY | |
| 2012 | "Warrior" | Kimbra | Daniel Kwan; Daniel Scheinert | |
| 2012 | "Houdini" | Foster the People | Daniel Kwan; Daniel Scheinert | |
| 2012 | "Fake It Baby, Fake It" | Living Things | Floria Sigismondi | |
| 2012 | "Take a Walk" | Passion Pit | David Wilson | |
| 2012 | "Five Seconds" | Twin Shadow | Keith Musil | |
| 2012 | "Patient" | Twin Shadow | Keith Musil | |
| 2012 | "Dope Bitch" | The-Dream | Lance Drake | |
| 2012 | "Anything Could Happen" | Ellie Goulding | Floria Sigismondi | |
| 2012 | "She Wolf (Falling to Pieces)" | David Guetta | Hiro Murai | |
| 2012 | "Cold Front" | Hammock | David Altobelli | |
| 2012 | "Sinking Inside Yourself" | Hammock | David Altobelli | |
| 2012 | "Tape Recorder" | Hammock | David Altobelli | |
| 2012 | "I Got Gold" | Willy Mason | Keith Musil | |
| 2012 | "Diamonds" | Rihanna | Anthony Mandler | |
| 2012 | "This Christmas" | Cee-Lo Green | Mikael Colombu | |
| 2012 | "Scream & Shout" | will.i.am | Ben Mor | |
| 2012 | "Chum" | Earl Sweatshirt | Hiro Murai | |
| 2012 | "Tears" | HEALTH | David Altobelli & Jeff Desom | |
| 2013 | "Pull Me Down" | Mikky Ekko | Sam Pilling | |
| 2013 | "Entertainment" | Phoenix | Patrick Daughters | |
| 2013 | "Cry Like a Ghost" | Passion Pit | Daniel Kwan; Daniel Scheinert | |
| 2013 | "Waiting All Night" | Rudimental | Nez | |
| 2013 | "Endorphins" | Sub Focus | Carlos López Estrada | |
| 2013 | "A Tattered Line of String" | The Postal Service | AB/CD/CD | |
| 2013 | "Despair" | Yeah Yeah Yeahs | Patrick Daughters | |
| 2013 | "Hive" | Earl Sweatshirt | Hiro Murai | |
| 2013 | "High Road" | Cults | Hiro Murai | |
| 2013 | "Free Your Mind" | Cut Copy | Christopher Hill | |
| 2013 | "Of the Night" | Bastille | Dave Ma | |
| 2014 | "Turn Down for What" | DJ Snake | Daniel Kwan; Daniel Scheinert | |
| 2014 | "Jealous (I Ain't with It)" | Chromeo | Ryan Hope | |
| 2014 | "Smooth Sailing" | Queens of the Stone Age | Hiro Murai | |
| 2014 | "Sweatpants" | Childish Gambino | Hiro Murai | |
| 2014 | "I Try to Talk to You" | Hercules and Love Affair | David Wilson | |
| 2014 | "We Exist" | Arcade Fire | David Wilson | |
| 2014 | "Pretty Girls" | Little Dragon | Nabil | |
| 2014 | "Gold" | Chet Faker | Hiro Murai | |
| 2014 | "Telegraph Ave" | Childish Gambino | Hiro Murai | |
| 2014 | "Never Catch Me" | Flying Lotus | Hiro Murai | |
| 2015 | "Grief" | Earl Sweatshirt | Hiro Murai | |
| 2016 | "Take It There" | Massive Attack | Hiro Murai | |
| 2016 | "Day Ones" | Baauer | Hiro Murai | |
| 2016 | "Black Man in a White World" | Michael Kiwanuka | Hiro Murai | |
| 2017 | "Dis Generation" | A Tribe Called Quest | Hiro Murai | |
| 2018 | "This Is America" | Childish Gambino | Hiro Murai | |
| 2019 | "This Land" | Gary Clark Jr. | Savanah Leaf | |
| 2019 | "Run for Me" | SebastiAn | Todd Tourso | |
| 2019 | "Graduation" | Benny Blanco and Juice Wrld | Jake Schreier | |
| 2019 | "Mean It" | Gracie Abrams | Matty Peacock | |
| 2020 | "sad day" | FKA Twigs | Hiro Murai | |
| 2020 | "Wonder" | Shawn Mendes | Matty Peacock | |
| 2021 | "I Can Almost See You" | Hammock | David Altobelli | |
| 2021 | "Together Alone" | Hammock | David Altobelli | |
| 2023 | "Release" | Hammock | David Altobelli | |
| 2024 | "Little Foot Big Foot" | Childish Gambino | Hiro Murai | |
