= Wolfs (film) =

2024 film by Jon Watts

- Release poster
- Directed by: Jon Watts
- Written by: Jon Watts
- Produced by: George Clooney; Grant Heslov; Brad Pitt; Dede Gardner; Jeremy Kleiner; Dianne McGunigle; Jon Watts
- Starring: George Clooney; Brad Pitt; Amy Ryan; Austin Abrams; Poorna Jagannathan
- Cinematography: Larkin Seiple
- Edited by: Andrew Weisblum
- Music by: Theodore Shapiro
- Production companies: Apple Studios; Freshman Year; Smokehouse Pictures; Plan B Entertainment
- Distributed by: Apple TV+
- Release dates: September 1, 2024 (Venice); September 20, 2024 (United States)
- Running time: 108 minutes
- Country: United States
- Language: English

Wolfs is a 2024 American action comedy film written and directed by Jon Watts. Starring George Clooney, Brad Pitt, and Austin Abrams, it follows two nameless, professional fixers who are forced to work together on a job despite their preference to operate as lone wolves.

Wolfs premiered out of competition at the Venice International Film Festival on September 1, 2024, to lukewarm reviews. It had a one-week limited theatrical release starting on September 20, 2024, it received mixed reviews from critics, and was released a week after on Apple TV+, where it became the streaming service's most-viewed film. Apple's decision to pivot the film to streaming despite pre-arranged agreements for a theatrical release led Watts not to move forward with a planned sequel. However, Sony Pictures (through Columbia Pictures) retains the distribution rights to the film for its video on demand release.

== Plot ==
Margaret, a Manhattan District Attorney, panics after a young man ("the Kid") dies in her hotel room. She calls a number given to her for just such an emergency by someone she trusts, and secures the services of an unnamed professional fixer. He arrives to dispose of the Kid, who Margaret explains was jumping on the bed and fell into a glass drinks cart.

Another unnamed fixer arrives, sent by the hotel's unseen owner, Pam, who saw everything via hidden cameras. To protect the hotel's reputation and the D.A.'s career, the two women urge the fixers to work together, much to their chagrin.

The fixers initially refuse, but Margaret privately reminds her fixer that he has been captured on the hidden surveillance footage, and quotes what her contact had told her about the fixer when providing his number: "You take a job, you give your word, and that word is the measure of a man."

The fixers reluctantly join forces, providing Margaret with an alibi and change of clothes, and sending her home. They find a large stash of drugs in the Kid's bag, which the hotel owner orders them to return to its original owners to avoid further trouble. Margaret's fixer deftly moves the body to the trunk of his car using a luggage cart, only to discover that the Kid is still alive but overdosing on drugs.

Knocking the Kid out and stowing him in the trunk, the fixers suspect the drugs belong to a shipment of pure drugs recently stolen from the Albanian mafia. They take the young man to a Chinatown restaurant, where an underground medic operates a clandestine clinic. The Kid, however, escapes in his underwear, leading the fixers on a chase through the city.

Catching him and sobering him up with pills from the medic, the fixers interrogate the Kid. He explains that he agreed to deliver the drugs as a favor to his friend Diego, a bartender at a nightclub. While waiting for the address to be sent via a pager, the Kid had met Margaret in an upscale hotel bar. After going to her room, he'd secretly tried the drugs on a whim.

The trio go to Diego's nightclub so the Kid can pick up the pager which had been left behind the bar. The fixers get caught up in a kolo (a wedding dance) and are recognized by Dimitri, a dangerous Croatian mobster for whom they had each previously worked alone. They save themselves by convincing Dimitri they are not working together against him, and leave separately.

The fixers deduce that drug kingpin Lagrange is Diego's employer, that he likely stole the Albanians' shipment, and that the Kid is being framed. The address for the drop, Lagrange's warehouse, is received to the pager. Though the fixers expect the Kid will be killed, they agree to let him make the delivery of the returned drugs.

The fixers watch from a car as the Kid enters the warehouse, but are ambushed by the Albanians and by Dimitri's bodyguards. They shoot their attackers dead and make their way inside to find that Lagrange's men and the Albanians have all killed one another, and the Kid has survived by hiding inside a car trunk.

Realizing that both fixers' clients would prefer that the Kid die to maintain their anonymity, they prepare to kill him while he's distracted, but have a change of heart. After accompanying the Kid home on the subway, they threaten him and his father to keep quiet about the entire incident.

Having breakfast at a diner in Brighton Beach, Margaret's fixer asks Pam's fixer how Pam convinced him to collaborate. He says she told him, "You take a job, you give your word, and that word is the measure of a man." Realizing the same person employs them both, they conclude that their employer orchestrated everything, and that they were meant to die in the warehouse.

They suddenly notice that several hitmen are gathering outside. They duck for cover and begin loading their weapons, and make a deal to tell one another their names if they survive. The movie ends as they begin firing out of the diner at the hitmen.

== Cast ==
- George Clooney as Jack, Margaret's Man
- Brad Pitt as Nick, Pam's Man
- Amy Ryan as Margaret
- Austin Abrams as the Kid
- Poorna Jagannathan as June
- Zlatko Burić as Dimitri
- Richard Kind as the Kid's dad
- Frances McDormand as the voice of Pam

== Production ==
In September 2021, a studio bidding war began for a film package that included Jon Watts as writer and director, with George Clooney and Brad Pitt on board to star and produce via their respective production labels, Smokehouse Pictures and Plan B Entertainment. Watts had pitched the film to Clooney via Zoom while editing the Marvel Cinematic Universe (MCU) film Spider-Man: No Way Home (2021). Clooney warned him that Pitt would be hard to convince, but in spite of Watts not being able to sleep properly due to struggling on how to approach Pitt, it later turned out that Clooney told Pitt about the project before Watts contacted him and Pitt immediately agreed to join when Watts called him. Wolfs reunites the two actors, who appeared together in the Ocean's trilogy (2001–2007) and Burn After Reading (2008).

Apple TV+ acquired the rights to it after winning the bidding war against Amazon MGM Studios, Annapurna Pictures, Lionsgate, Metro-Goldwyn-Mayer, Netflix, Sony Pictures (which briefly took over theatrical distribution rights before it was pivoted to limited), Universal Pictures and Warner Bros. Pictures. To make Wolfs as well to take a break from the superhero genre, Watts exited the MCU film The Fantastic Four: First Steps (2025) in April 2022. Additional cast members were revealed in 2023. Principal photography reportedly began in January 2023 in New York City, including the neighborhoods of Harlem and Chinatown. Larkin Seiple, who shot Watts' Cop Car (2015), was the cinematographer of the approximately 70-day shoot.

In August 2024, The New York Times reported that Apple paid Clooney and Pitt more than $35 million to star and Watts more than $15 million to direct the film. Clooney denied this claim, stating, "It is millions and millions and millions of dollars less than what was reported. And I am only saying that because I think it's bad for our industry if that's what people think is the standard bearer for salaries."

== Release ==
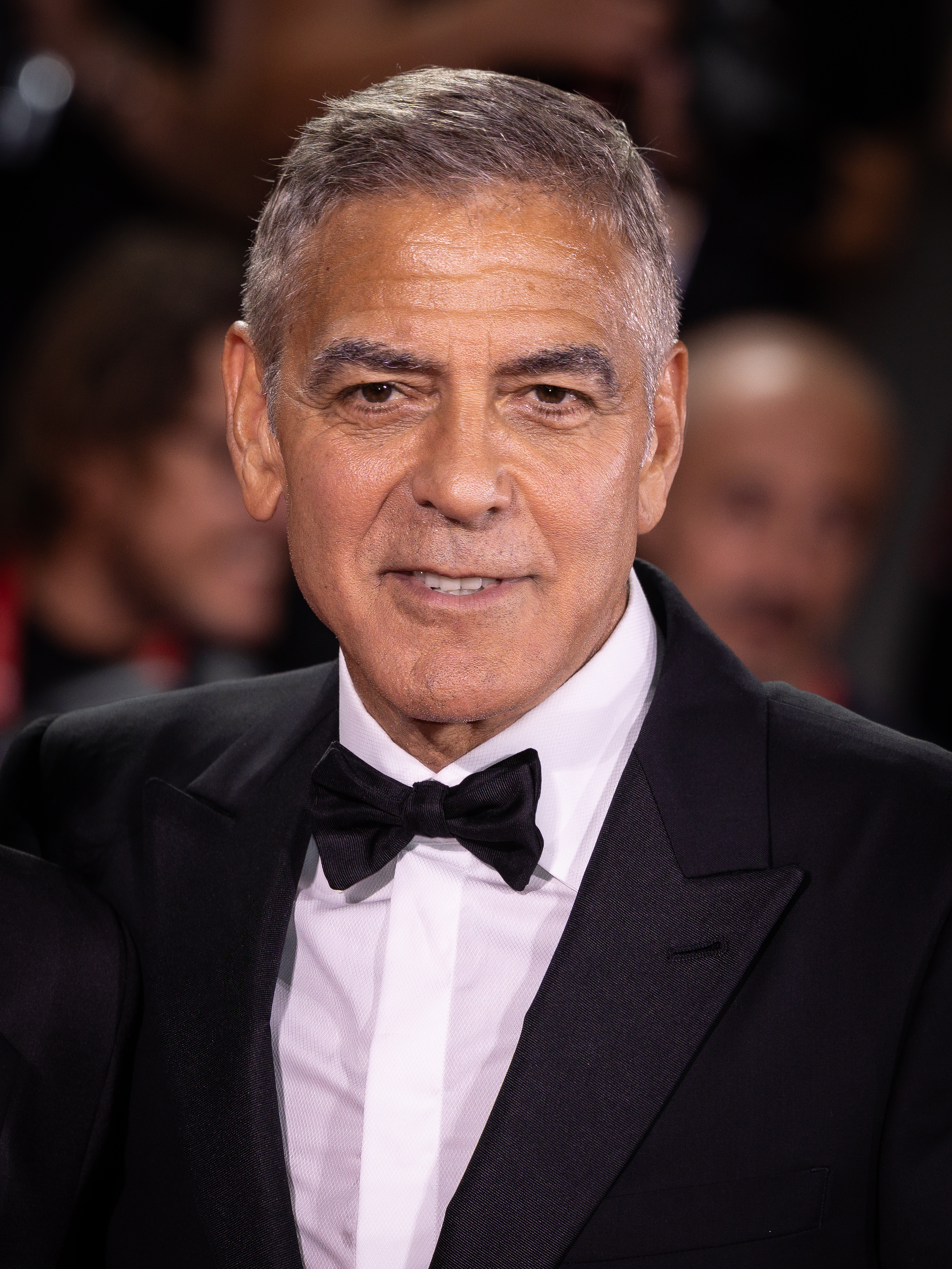
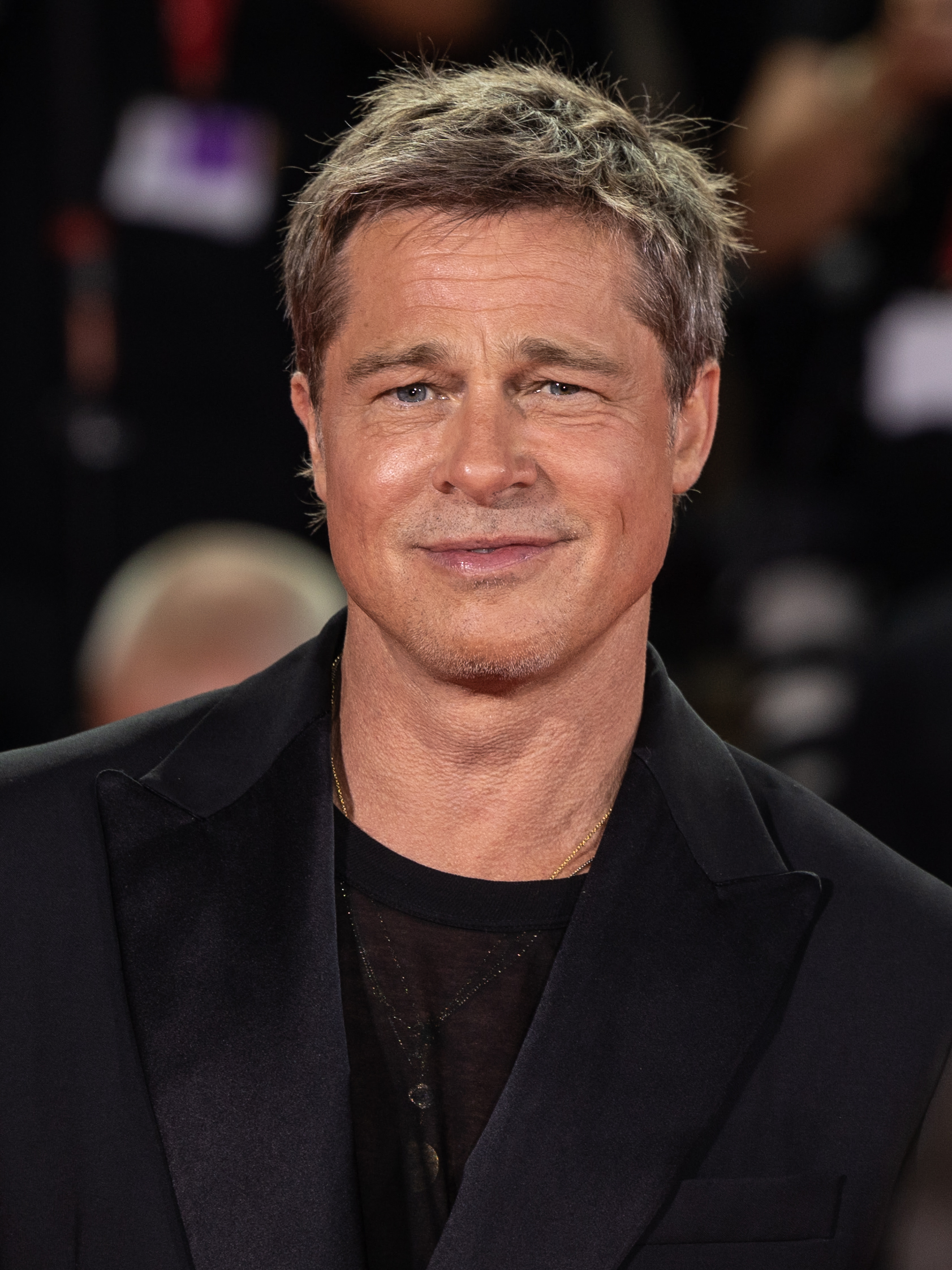
Clooney and Pitt at the film's premiere in Venice

Wolfs debuted on Apple TV+ on September 27, 2024. It was originally set for a wide release in cinemas since Apple acquired it in 2021, Clooney and Pitt having "made the deal to do that movie where we gave money back to make sure that we had a theatrical release." In December 2023, Apple entered another agreement with Sony Pictures Releasing, following their partnership on Napoleon, to distribute the film in cinemas, scheduling it for release in the United States on September 20, 2024.

In August 2024, six weeks before its release, Apple announced its decision to pivot from a wide release to a limited theatrical release on the same date. The New York Times noted that Sony, who had agreed to distribute the film and split marketing costs with Apple, was set to begin a national marketing campaign during the 2024 Paris Olympics. However, Zack Van Amburg, overseer of Apple's entertainment programming, canceled those plans and the deal with Sony, as Apple executives hoped "to not risk a public disappointment should the movie not succeed at the box office". Clooney said he and Pitt put some of their salary into keeping the limited release, which was then set to be handled solely by Apple.

The film premiered out of competition at the 81st Venice International Film Festival on September 1, 2024. Watts missed the event due to contracting COVID-19.

== Reception ==
On the review aggregator website Rotten Tomatoes, 67% of 177 critics' reviews are positive, with an average rating of 5.9/10. The website's consensus reads: "George Clooney and Brad Pitt's professional star power gives Wolfs zip even when it cycles through clichés of the fixer genre, making for a pleasing and slick throwback." Metacritic, which uses a weighted average, assigned the film a score of 60 out of 100, based on 51 critics, indicating "mixed or average" reviews.

== Canceled sequel ==
A month prior to its release, Apple confirmed a sequel was in the works, with Watts, Clooney, and Pitt returning. Of the announcement, Watts said, "Apple's been talking to me about a sequel since I turned in my cut in December [2023]. That's always been an ongoing discussion. I absolutely did not write the movie with a sequel in mind. But it was very fun to make, so I don't know, I think you let the audience decide if they want to see more." In November 2024, Watts announced that he personally decided not to move forward with a sequel as he was displeased with Apple's decision to pivot Wolfs to streaming.
