= Waverly Films =

Group of filmmakers based in Brooklyn, New York, U.S.

- Legal status: Active
- Location: Brooklyn, New York City
- Region served: North America
- Services: Arts
- Official language: English
- Key people: Duncan Skiles; Christopher Ford; Jeff Kaplan; Ben Dickinson; Jon Watts; Jake Schreier; Aaron Wesner

Waverly Films is a Brooklyn based group of filmmakers who met at NYU and are named after a nearby diner. The group is Duncan Skiles, Christopher Ford, Jeff Kaplan, Ben Dickinson, Jon Watts, Jake Schreier, and Aaron Wesner. They usually work with cinematographer Matthew J Santo.

Their members' portfolios include films commissioned for MTV, VH1, Channel 102, McDonald's, Heinz Ketchup and bands such as The Rapture, Fatboy Slim, LCD Soundsystem, Death Cab For Cutie, and TV on the Radio. Their newest work has included Burger King, ESPN, Trident, and Reebok. They made videos published on the internet which later on were used on Online Nation on The CW.

They made a pilot for Comedy Central called The Scariest Show on Television.

Waverly Films won the 2008 YouTube Sketchies 2 Contest sponsored by Toyota Corolla. They previously came in second place in a 24-hour film contest in 2004.

They are also known for their recurring web series, Clip of the Week, which is often published to YouTube and are very popular with fans. Since becoming YouTube members in June 2007, they have amassed over 60,000 subscribers to their content.

They also opened their own online merchandise store.

In 2009, Waverly Films won a Webby Award and a People's Voice award for its six-episode animated series Stickman Exodus on Atom.com.

In 2016, it was revealed that Waverly Films would produce the film Spider-Man: Homecoming, which was directed by Jon Watts.
