= Lebanon, PA (film) =

- Film poster
- Written by: Ben Hickernell
- Produced by: Jason Contino
- Starring: Josh Hopkins; Samantha Mathis; Rachel Kitson; Ian Peakes; Mary Beth Hurt
- Cinematography: Jeff Schirmer
- Edited by: Ben Hickernell
- Music by: Thomas Newman
- Production company: Reconstruction Pictures
- Release dates: March 14, 2010 (South by Southwest Film Festival); April 29, 2011 (United States)
- Running time: 100 minutes
- Country: United States
- Languages: Arabic, English, Hebrew
- Box office: $48,381

Lebanon, PA is a 2010 American drama film written and directed by Ben Hickernell. The film tells the story of Will, a 35-year-old Philadelphian who travels to nearby Lebanon, Pennsylvania, to bury his recently deceased father. While visiting he connects with his 17-year-old cousin, CJ, who is recently pregnant. Will then meets and becomes romantically interested in CJ's teacher, who is married. After CJ has an argument with her father, she and Will face difficult decisions regarding their futures. The film explores the challenges of bridging the cultural divide in the United States through the lens of an extended family.

Matt Pond and Chris Hansen of the band Matt Pond PA composed the score for the film.

The film premiered at the 2010 South by Southwest Film Festival, and had a limited release in the United States on April 29, 2011.

== Reception ==
On the review aggregator website Rotten Tomatoes, 50% of 16 critics' reviews are positive, with an average rating of 6/10. Metacritic, which uses a weighted average, assigned the film a score of 47 out of 100, based on 8 critics, indicating "mixed or average" reviews.
