= Samantha Mathis =

American actress and trade union leader (born 1970)

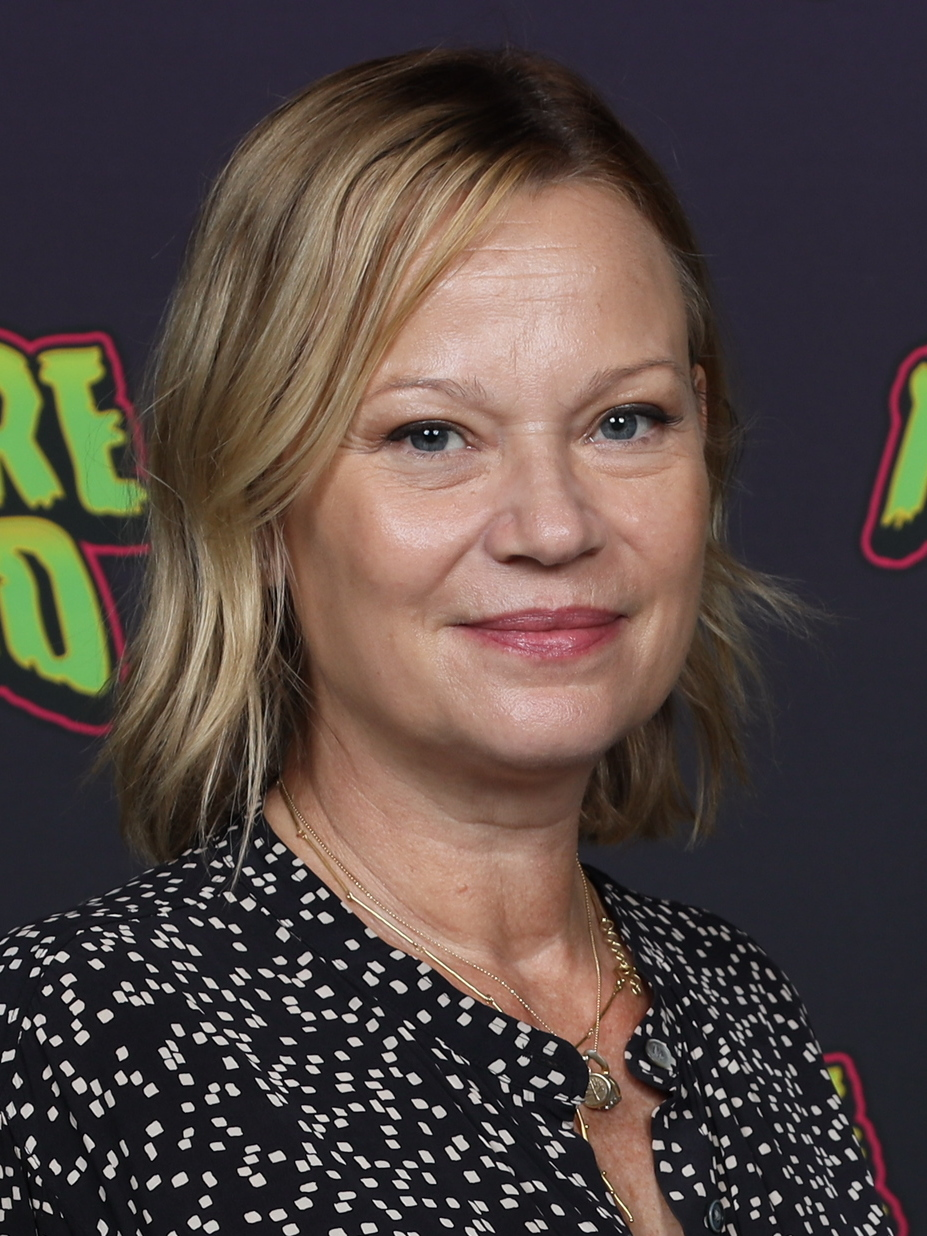
- Mathis at Nightmare Weekend Richmond in 2023
- Born: May 12, 1970 (age 56); Williamsburg, Brooklyn, New York City, New York, U.S.
- Occupations: Actress; trade union leader
- Years active: 1986–present
- Mother: Bibi Besch
- Relatives: Gotfrid Köchert (grandfather); Gusti Huber (grandmother)

Samantha Mathis (born May 12, 1970) is an American actress and trade union leader who served as the vice president for actors/performers of SAG-AFTRA from 2015 to 2019. (Note: Each position is for two years. Mathis was elected in 2015 and re-elected in 2017.) The daughter of actress Bibi Besch, Mathis made her film debut in Pump Up the Volume (1990), provided the voice of Crysta in FernGully: The Last Rainforest (1992), and had a lead role in The Thing Called Love (1993). Mathis subsequently had supporting roles in films such as Little Women (1994), How to Make an American Quilt, The American President (both 1995), Broken Arrow (1996), American Psycho (2000), The Punisher (2004), American Pastoral (2016), Ray Meets Helen (2017), Being Frank, The Clovehitch Killer (both 2018), The Exorcism (2024), and By Design (2025).

She also had recurring roles as Justine Feraldo on the second and third seasons of the FX horror drama series The Strain (2015–2016) and Sara Hammon on the fourth season of the Showtime drama series Billions (2019).

== Early life ==
Mathis was born in Williamsburg, Brooklyn, New York City, the daughter of Donald Mathis and Austrian-American actress Bibi Besch. Her parents divorced when she was two years old, and Mathis was brought up by her mother. She relocated with her mother to Los Angeles, California, at the age of five.

Besch tried to discourage Mathis from pursuing acting, but growing up on locations, in theaters, and in acting classes, Mathis knew she wanted to act. She decided to become an actress at the age of twelve.

== Career ==
Mathis began acting professionally at the age of 16. Her first job was a commercial for "Always Slender Pads – Just for Teens". She co-starred in the television series Aaron's Way and Knightwatch from 1988 to 1989. Her first starring role in a feature film was that of Nora in Pump Up the Volume (1990), opposite Christian Slater, whom she briefly dated at the time. Mathis dyed her natural blonde hair black for the role in an effort to change her image from sweet and innocent to strong-willed.

Mathis appeared in the television films Extreme Close-up, 83 Hours 'til Dawn and To My Daughter in 1990. Mathis and Slater had voice roles in the animated film FernGully: The Last Rainforest (1992). She next appeared in the comedy This Is My Life (1992), written and directed by Nora Ephron, playing an insecure teenager. Mathis appeared in the play Fortinbras in New York City on October 1992. She also appeared in Super Mario Bros. (1993), in which she played Princess Daisy from the popular Nintendo video game. The film was a box-office bomb but gained a cult following since its release.

Mathis co-starred with River Phoenix in The Thing Called Love (1993). She appeared in the 1994 film adaptation of Little Women, and in How to Make an American Quilt (1995), both starring Winona Ryder. She then appeared in The American President (1995), playing the assistant to the President of the United States. Mathis co-starred with Slater again, along with John Travolta, in John Woo's Broken Arrow (1996). She took a little over a year off from acting after her mother died in 1996 from breast cancer.

Mathis later appeared in American Psycho (2000), a film adaptation of Bret Easton Ellis's 1991 novel of the same name. She starred in Attraction (2000) and in The Simian Line (2001). She starred in the TNT television miniseries The Mists of Avalon (2001). Mathis starred with Thomas Jane in The Punisher (2004). She had a guest role on the ABC television show Lost as Olivia Goodspeed. She played Jane Fonda's daughter in the Broadway show "33 Variations". Her indie film Lebanon, PA (2010) had its world premiere at the 2010 SXSW Film Festival. She appeared in an off-Broadway production of the play, Love, Loss, and What I Wore, at New York City's Westside Theatre in October 2011.

In 2013, Mathis played psychiatrist Alice Calvert on the CBS television series Under the Dome, based on a novel by Stephen King. In 2014, she joined the cast of the FX horror drama series The Strain as Justine Feraldo, a New York City councilwoman for Staten Island.

In October 2015, Mathis was elected National Vice President, Actors/Performers of SAG-AFTRA. She was re-elected in 2017.

In 2019, she appeared off-Broadway in the role of Kate Conlee in Make Believe, a new play by Bess Wohl staged at the Second Stage Theater. Michael Greif directed the play. Her 2020 musical Whisper House was postponed due to the COVID-19 pandemic.

== Personal life ==
Mathis met actor River Phoenix on the set of the 1993 film The Thing Called Love. Soon thereafter, she broke up with her boyfriend and Super Mario Bros. co-star John Leguizamo and started a relationship with Phoenix. She was with Phoenix on October 31, 1993, the night he died at Cedars-Sinai Hospital of a drug overdose after collapsing outside The Viper Room in West Hollywood, California.

In the autopsy report the Los Angeles County Sheriff's Department detailed that Mathis refused several times to give more details surrounding the death of Phoenix and had told deputies at the time of Phoenix's death that she had no knowledge of his drug use. Mathis took a role in the film Jack and Sarah (1995), which was shot in London, to get out of the country after Phoenix's death because of the excessive press coverage.

Mathis spoke for the first time publicly about the death of Phoenix in an interview with The Guardian in 2018. She elaborated on the circumstances surrounding Phoenix's death: "I knew something was wrong that night, something I didn't understand. I didn't see anyone doing drugs but he was high in a way that made me feel uncomfortable...the heroin that killed him didn't happen until he was in the Viper Room. I have my suspicions about what was going on, but I didn't see anything."

== Filmography ==
=== Film ===
Year	Title	Role	Notes
1989	The Bulldance	Paula	
1990	Pump Up the Volume	Nora Diniro	
1992	This Is My Life	Erica Ingels	Nominated—Young Artist Award for Best Young Actress Starring in a Motion Picture
1992	FernGully: The Last Rainforest	Crysta	Voice
1993	The Music of Chance	Tiffany	
1993	Super Mario Bros.	Princess Daisy / The Queen	
1993	The Thing Called Love	Miranda Presley	
1994	Little Women	Adult Amy March	
1995	Jack and Sarah	Amy	
1995	How to Make an American Quilt	Young Sophia Darling Richards	Nominated—Screen Actors Guild Award for Outstanding Performance by a Cast in a Motion Picture
1995	The American President	Janie Basdin	
1996	Broken Arrow	Terry Carmichael	
1996	Museum of Love	Stephanie	Short film
1998	Waiting for Woody	Gail Silver	Short film
1998	Sweet Jane	Jane	
2000	American Psycho	Courtney Rawlinson	
2000	Attraction	Corey	
2001	The Simian Line	Mae	
2004	The Punisher	Maria Castle	
2005	Kids in America	Jennifer Rose	
2005	Touched	Jeannie Bates	
2006	Believe in Me	Jean Driscoll	
2006	Local Color	Carla	
2009	The New Daughter	Cassandra Parker	
2010	Buried	Linda Conroy	Voice
2010	Lebanon, PA	Vicki	
2010	Order of Chaos	Jennifer	
2011	Good Day for It	Sarah Bryant	
2012	Camilla Dickinson	Rose Dickinson	
2012	Atlas Shrugged: Part II	Dagny Taggart	
2014	Affluenza	Bunny Miller	
2016	American Pastoral	Penny Hamlin	
2017	Ray Meets Helen	Mary	
2018	Being Frank	Bonnie	
2018	The Clovehitch Killer	Cindy	
2018	Boarding School	Isabel	
2023	Pet Sematary: Bloodlines	Kathy	
2024	The Exorcism	Jennifer Simon	
2025	By Design	Lisa	
2025	Isle Child	Carey Miller	

=== Television ===
Year	Title	Role	Notes
1988	Aaron's Way	Roseanne Miller	Main cast
1988	Circle of Love	Roseanne Miller	Television film
1988–1989	Knightwatch	Jacqueline 'Jake' Monroe	Main cast
1989	Cold Sassy Tree	Lightfoot McClendon	Television film
1989	CBS Summer Playhouse	Mary Dunne	Episode: "American Nuclear"
1990	Extreme Close-Up	Laura	Television film
1990	83 Hours 'Til Dawn	Julie Burdock	Television film
1990	To My Daughter	Anne Carlston	Television film
1999	The Outer Limits	Marie Wells	Episode: "The Shroud"
1999	Freak City	Ruth Ellison	Television film
1999–2000	Harsh Realm	Sophie Green	4 episodes
2000	Mermaid	Rhonda	Television film
2001	First Years	Ann Weller	Main cast
2001	Night Visions	Diane Ballard	Episode: "The Passenger List/Bokor"
2001	The Mists of Avalon	Gwenhwyfar	Miniseries
2002	PBS Hollywood Presents	Lisa Morrison	Episode: "Collected Stories"
2003	The Twilight Zone	Rachel Stark	Episode: "Into the Light"
2003, 2014, 2020	Law & Order: Special Victims Unit	Hilary Barclay / Catherine Summers / Melanie Franks	3 episodes
2004	Salem's Lot	Susan Norton	Miniseries; Nominated — Saturn Award for Best Supporting Actress on Television
2005	Fathers and Sons	Jenny	Television film
2005	Law & Order: Criminal Intent	Dr. Christine Ansel	Episode: "Saving Face"
2006	Secrets of a Small Town	Samantha Steele	Episode: "Pilot"
2006	Absolution	Bettina Lloyd	Television film
2006	House	Maria Palko	Episode: "Clueless"
2006	Nightmares and Dreamscapes: From the Stories of Stephen King	Karen Evans	Episode: "The Fifth Quarter"
2007	Lost	Olivia Goodspeed	Episode: "The Man Behind the Curtain"
2007	A Stranger's Heart	Callie Morgan	Television film
2007	Oprah Winfrey Presents: Mitch Albom's For One More Day	Young Pauline 'Posey' Benetto	Television film
2009	Grey's Anatomy	Melinda Prescott	3 episodes
2009	Royal Pains	Amy Hill	Episode: "Wonderland"
2010	Unanswered Prayers	Lorrie Beck	Television film
2011	Curb Your Enthusiasm	Donna	Episode: "The Hero"
2013	Under the Dome	Alice Calvert	Recurring role (season 1)
2014	The Good Wife	Bonita Yarrow	Episode: "The Line"
2015–2016	The Strain	Justine Feraldo	Main cast (seasons 2–3)
2019	Billions	Sara Hammon	Recurring role (season 4)
2019	Into the Dark	Dr. Victoria Harris	Episode: "All That We Destroy"
2019	Bull	Avery Kress	Episode: "The Flying Carpet"
2023	12 Desperate Hours	Val Jane	Television film
2026	Elsbeth	Elaine McClusk	Episode: "Murder Six Across"
