= The Clovehitch Killer =

2018 American thriller film

- Theatrical release poster
- Directed by: Duncan Skiles
- Written by: Christopher Ford
- Produced by: Andrew Kortschak; Cody Ryder; Walter Kortschak
- Starring: Dylan McDermott; Charlie Plummer; Samantha Mathis; Madisen Beaty
- Cinematography: Luke McCoubrey
- Edited by: Megan Brooks; Andrew Hasse
- Music by: Matt Veligdan
- Production company: End Cue
- Distributed by: IFC Midnight
- Release dates: September 22, 2018 (LAFF); November 16, 2018 (United States)
- Running time: 110 minutes
- Country: United States
- Language: English

The Clovehitch Killer is a 2018 American coming-of-age thriller film, directed by Duncan Skiles in his directorial debut and written by Christopher Ford. It stars Dylan McDermott, Charlie Plummer, Samantha Mathis, and Madisen Beaty. The film was mostly inspired by the story of real life serial killer Dennis Rader, also known as the BTK Killer.

It premiered at LA Film Festival, on September 22, 2018, and it received a limited theatrical release, on November 16, 2018, distributed by IFC Midnight.

== Plot ==
16-year-old Tyler Burnside lives with his Christian family in a small Kentucky town. The town and its residents are haunted by the memory of the Clovehitch Killer, an infamous serial killer who bound and strangled ten known female victims before disappearing ten years earlier.

One night, Tyler takes his father's truck to see a girl, who finds a bondage photograph between the seats. When word of the photo spreads among teenagers in Tyler's church and scout troop, they ostracize him, believing him to be a BDSM fetishist. Tyler, meanwhile, begins to wonder if his father, family man and community leader Don Burnside, has a connection to the Clovehitch Killer. Investigating Don's private shed, Tyler finds a hidden compartment containing bondage magazines, along with a Polaroid photo of a beaten and bound woman.

Suspecting his father might be the killer, Tyler approaches Kassi, an outcast and amateur Clovehitch historian, and asks for help. They link the photo to a known Clovehitch victim and later uncover blueprints of a BDSM dungeon in the shed. Exploring his house's crawl space, Tyler finds a box containing the driver's licenses of the ten Clovehitch victims and three other women, as well as more Polaroid photos of beaten and bound women.

Don, now suspicious of Tyler's behavior, takes him camping. To explain the evidence Tyler had uncovered, Don says that the Clovehitch Killer was Tyler's vegetative uncle Rudy, who became paralyzed after the guilt drove him to a suicide attempt. Don says he kept the evidence in hopes of one day giving it to the victims' families. Tyler accepts the explanation, and the two burn all the evidence. Tyler ends the investigation, although Kassi remains unsatisfied with Don's story.

Uncharacteristically, Don allows Tyler to attend a scout leadership camp, something he'd previously claimed the family had no money for. He then sends his wife and daughter to his in-laws for two weeks. Home alone, he attempts to recreate the burned photographs by taking pictures of himself crossdressing in bondage positions. Unsatisfied, he angrily throws the photos away. Kassi briefly stops by looking for Tyler, but receives a call on her cell phone and leaves.

Don then stalks a woman to her home. He breaks in when she sleeps, binds her, and begins strangling her. However, Tyler appears in the house with a rifle. A flashback reveals that Tyler never left for camp, but instead was tailing Don with Kassi. It is also revealed that Kassi's mother was one of the three unknown Clovehitch victims.

Tyler confronts his father and tries to talk him into giving himself up. Don claims that they are having an affair, with his wife's knowledge. Meanwhile, Kassi tries to help the bound woman but Don knocks her out. Don then convinces Tyler to hand over the gun. Don tries to shoot Tyler, only to find the gun unloaded. As the two scuffle, Kassi awakens and knocks Don unconscious. Kassi begins to dial 9-1-1, but Tyler stops her.

Later, Don has been declared missing. The family is informed by the police that Don's body has been found and his death ruled a suicide. At their church, Tyler delivers a eulogy for Don, intercut with flashbacks of him and Kassi dragging an unconscious Don into the forest to stage his death. Don slowly wakes up to Tyler pointing a pistol at his head. Tyler ends the eulogy with, "Dad, if you can hear me, I love you."

== Cast ==
- Charlie Plummer as Tyler Burnside
- Dylan McDermott as Don Burnside
- Samantha Mathis as Cindy Burnside
- Madisen Beaty as Kassi
- Brenna Sherman as Susie Burnside
- Lance Chantiles-Wertz as Billy
- Emma Jones as Amy

== Production ==
The film is set in Kentucky where it also was shot. Director Duncan Skiles took inspiration from the story of Dennis Rader, also known as the BTK (Bind, Torture, Kill) serial killer.

== Reception ==
On the review aggregator website Rotten Tomatoes, 79% of 38 critics' reviews are positive. The website's consensus reads: "The Clovehitch Killer patiently dials up the tension with a story that makes up for a lack of surprises with strong performances and a chilling wit." Metacritic, which uses a weighted average, assigned the film a score of 59 out of 100, based on 11 critics, indicating "mixed or average" reviews.

The New York Times's Jeannette Catsoulis wrote, "Christopher Ford's screenplay has obvious narrative holes... and the relentless focus on mood over action can drag. Even so, McDermott is admirably unsettling, and Luke McCoubrey's artfully sterile cinematography adds an air of suffocating wholesomeness that can make you squirm." Entertainment Weekly's Dana Schwartz gave the film a B+ grade, writing, "Unlike so many recent horror movies, The Clovehitch Killer is patient with its thrills, almost excruciatingly so", but added that it "falters with the character of Kassi". Emily Yoshida of Vulture said that Don's character was "convincing because it's not terribly sensationalized, and the film's conclusion is similarly smart, completely pulling the rug out from under our expectations of justice and revenge."

Justin Lowe of The Hollywood Reporter called the plot "slow...more reliant on atmosphere than action to build suspense...offers an intriguing perspective on the dark side of Americans values...but lacks the conviction to entirely expose the cultural contradictions that often enable compulsive murderers...It's a missed opportunity."

In a 2019 list of the 50 best serial killer movies of all time, Paste magazine ranked The Clovehitch Killer at #48, writing "This is a devilish movie that does beautifully what horror films are meant to—vex us with fear—through the most deceptively simple of means." Lauded horror author Stephen King wrote about the film, calling it "an excellent small movie", "unbearably suspenseful", and "(n)ot for the faint of heart".

== See also ==
- Clove hitch
