= Twister (1989 film) =

1989 American comedy film by Michael Almereyda

- Directed by: Michael Almereyda
- Screenplay by: Michael Almereyda
- Based on: Oh! by Mary Robison
- Produced by: Dan Ireland; William J. Quigley; Wieland Schulz-Keil
- Starring: Harry Dean Stanton; Suzy Amis; Crispin Glover; Dylan McDermott; Jenny Wright; Lindsay Christman; Lois Chiles
- Cinematography: Renato Berta
- Edited by: Roberto Silvi
- Music by: Hans Zimmer
- Distributed by: Vestron Pictures
- Release date: June 30, 1989
- Running time: 93 minutes
- Language: English
- Box office: $33,455

Twister is a 1989 American comedy film directed by Michael Almereyda and starring Suzy Amis, Crispin Glover, Harry Dean Stanton, and Dylan McDermott. It was shot in Wichita, Kansas. Based on Mary Robison's 1981 novel Oh!, the film relates the story of the eccentric Cleveland family during the event of a tornado hitting their rural Kansas home.

== Plot ==
Eugene Cleveland (Stanton) built soda pop and mini-golf empires and lives off the proceeds; his two adult children, Maureen (Amis), and Howdy (Glover), live with him in his mansion along with Maureen's daughter Violet, and Lola, the housekeeper. Maureen is plagued by unwanted visits from her ex, Chris (McDermott), who has recently returned from Canada with the intention of marrying Maureen and becoming a father to Violet. Howdy is enrolled in a local university and pursues rolling interests in painting, music, and theater, all with an absurdist slant. He is also desperately trying to convince Stephanie, a young groundskeeper from the University, to marry him and go off to Europe. Eugene, exasperated with Howdy's high-brow attitude and Maureen's sullen listlessness, spends his time drinking and courting Virginia, a local host of a Christian children's TV program. The group continuously annoy each other, fight, and try to find themselves in an isolated little world where all of the necessities of life are provided, but purpose is lacking.

Howdy finds an envelope with their mother's address and he and Maureen take Violet with them in an effort to track her down. The address on the envelope leads them to a farm in which they meet an unnamed character played by William S. Burroughs. Burroughs tells them he bought the farm from her and met her once when they were in escrow; that "Jim" spoke with her mostly. When the kids ask if they can speak to Jim, Burroughs replies: "Jim got kicked in the head by a horse last year. [He] went around killing horses for a while, until he ate the insides of a clock and he died" (a line originally found in John Millington Synge's 1907 play Playboy of the Western World). He then indicates that he thinks she moved to Ireland and that becomes the focus of their drive to see her and forgive her.

Eugene, frustrated with Virginia's condescending attitude toward his family, breaks up with her. During a particularly heated dinner one evening, Eugene overreacts to Howdy's insults and explodes, tipping over bowls of gazpacho. Howdy reveals to his father that he and Maureen have actively attempted to find their mother. Eugene informs them that she died in a mental institution and didn't even recognize him toward the end.

Maureen and Chris decide to get married and Stephanie goes back to her old boyfriend. Meanwhile, Eugene absconds from his immediate family and goes off to destinations unknown with Lola.

== Cast ==
- Harry Dean Stanton as Eugene Cleveland
- Suzy Amis as Maureen Cleveland
- Crispin Glover as Howdy Cleveland
- Dylan McDermott as Chris
- Jenny Wright as Stephanie
- Lindsay Christman as Violet
- Charlayne Woodard as Lola
- Lois Chiles as Virginia
- David Brown as Bob Breevort
- Tim Robbins as Jeff

== Reception ==
Dave Kehr wrote in the Chicago Tribune that the film was "worth a look for the unexpected delicacy of its execution and the all-cult quality of its casting" and noted that "Almereyda creates a kind of low-key, unemphatic weirdness that gets its laughs but still leaves room for moments of surprising emotional authenticity."

Peter Travers for Rolling Stone called it a "fiendish funny farce".
