= Christopher Ford (screenwriter) =

American film screenwriter, producer, and actor

Christopher D. Ford
- Occupations: Film screenwriter; Producer; Actor
- Years active: 2008–present
- Notable work: Clown; Cop Car; Spider-Man: Homecoming

Christopher D. Ford is an American film screenwriter, producer, and actor best known for his collaborations with director Jon Watts, including Clown (2014), Cop Car (2015), and Spider-Man: Homecoming (2017).

== Career ==
In 2008, Ford had a starring role in the horror film I Can See You, alongside other employees of Waverly Films. In 2012, he began his writing career by drafting the screenplay for the science fiction film Robot & Frank. By August 2012, Ford was writing the screenplay for the slasher film Thanksgiving with Jon Watts, Eli Roth, and Jeff Rendell. In 2014, he wrote the script for the horror film Clown, directed by Watts. In 2015, he continued his collaboration with Watts with the action film Cop Car. In 2017, he gained notability from drafting the screenplay for the Marvel Cinematic Universe film Spider-Man: Homecoming, his third collaboration with Watts. In 2018, he wrote the script for the horror film The Clovehitch Killer. In 2021, he rewrote the script for the fantasy film Chaos Walking.

In 2024, Watts and Ford created and executive produced the Disney+ series Star Wars: Skeleton Crew, a coming of age tale set after the events of Return of the Jedi. Ford received the Children's and Family Emmy Award for Outstanding Young Teen Series for his work on the series. By December 2025, Ford provided uncredited rewrites on Masters of the Universe (2026), receiving an "additional literary material" credit.

== Filmography ==
=== Film ===
Year	Title	Writer	Producer	Ref.
2012	Robot & Frank	Yes	No	
2014	Clown	Yes	No	
2015	Cop Car	Yes	No	
2017	Spider-Man: Homecoming	Yes	No	
2018	The Clovehitch Killer	Yes	Yes	
2021	Chaos Walking	Yes	No	
2026	Masters of the Universe	Uncredited	No	"additional literary material"

Actor

Year	Title	Role	Ref.
2008	I Can See You	John Kimble	

=== Television ===
Year	Title	Writer	Executive producer	Notes
2024-25	Star Wars: Skeleton Crew	Yes	Yes	Creator and executive producer (8 episodes); Writer (6 episodes)
