= Star Wars: Skeleton Crew =

American science fiction adventure television series

- Genre: Adventure; Coming-of-age; Science fiction
- Created by: Jon Watts; Christopher Ford
- Based on: Star Wars by George Lucas
- Showrunners: Jon Watts; Christopher Ford
- Starring: Jude Law; Ravi Cabot-Conyers; Ryan Kiera Armstrong; Kyriana Kratter; Robert Timothy Smith; Nick Frost
- Composer: Mick Giacchino
- Country of origin: United States
- Original language: English
- No. of seasons: 1
- No. of episodes: 8

Production
- Executive producers: Christopher Ford; Jon Watts; Jon Favreau; Dave Filoni; Kathleen Kennedy; Colin Wilson
- Producers: Susan McNamara; John Bartnicki
- Production location: Los Angeles, California
- Cinematography: Sean Porter; David Klein
- Editors: Andrew S. Eisen; Terel Gibson; Katheryn Naranjo
- Running time: 32–47 minutes
- Production companies: Lucasfilm; Golem Creations

Original release
- Network: Disney+
- Release: December 2, 2024 – January 14, 2025

Related
- The Mandalorian; The Book of Boba Fett; Ahsoka; Star Wars original trilogy; Star Wars prequel trilogy

Star Wars: Skeleton Crew is an American television miniseries created by Jon Watts and Christopher Ford for the streaming service Disney+. It is part of the Star Wars franchise, taking place in the same timeframe as The Mandalorian and its other interconnected spin-offs after the events of the film Return of the Jedi (1983). Skeleton Crew tells the story of four children searching for their home planet after getting lost in the galaxy, and the strange aliens and dangerous places they encounter on their adventure.

Jude Law stars in the series with Ravi Cabot-Conyers, Ryan Kiera Armstrong, Kyriana Kratter, Robert Timothy Smith, and Nick Frost. Watts approached Lucasfilm about telling an Amblin Entertainment-style coming-of-age story set in the Star Wars universe, and he was developing the series with Ford by early 2022. It was officially announced that May at Star Wars Celebration, with Law revealed to be starring. Filming began by September 2022 in Los Angeles, and wrapped by late January 2023. The child actors in the series were revealed in April 2023. Kathleen Kennedy, Jon Favreau, and Dave Filoni returned from The Mandalorian as additional executive producers.

Skeleton Crew premiered on Disney+ on December 2, 2024, with episodes released weekly until January 14, 2025. The series received generally positive reviews from critics. It received seventeen nominations at the 4th Children's and Family Emmy Awards, winning four, including Outstanding Young Teen Series.

== Premise ==
Roughly five years after the fall of the Galactic Empire, four children end up on an adventure to make their way home after being lost in the galaxy following a discovery they make on their home planet At Attin while befriending a Force-user.

== Cast and characters ==
=== Starring ===
- Jude Law as Jod Na Nawood: A pirate captain and a Force-user who was trained in the Jedi arts. Law described Jod as a quick thinker who uses his charm to get out of difficulties.
- Ravi Cabot-Conyers as Wim: A human boy from the planet At Attin.
- Ryan Kiera Armstrong as Fern: A human girl from the planet At Attin.
- Kyriana Kratter as KB: A human girl and friend of Fern from the planet At Attin who wears a cybernetic visor connected to an implant on her head ever since an unspecified accident.
- Robert Timothy Smith as Neel: An elephant-like alien boy (a Myykian) who is Wim's friend from the planet At Attin. Smith performed multiple takes as the character, which were mimicked by Kacie Borrowman, a performance artist wearing an animatronic head of the character. This would allow the creatives to use either Smith or the animatronic in the final edit.
- Nick Frost as the voice of SM-33: The decrepit droid first mate of the Onyx Cinder. Rob Ramsdell serves as the performance artist for SM-33.

=== Featured co-stars ===
- Tunde Adebimpe as Wendle: Wim's father.
- Kerry Condon as Fara: Fern's mother who works as a teacher and Undersecretary in the office of The Supervisor on At Attin.
- Alia Shawkat as the voice of Kh'ymm: An unidentified owl-like alien and map expert with a testy allyship with Jod.
- Hala Finley as Hayna: A child soldier in the Troik clan on At Achrann.
- Mathieu Kassovitz as General Strix: The leader of the Troik clan on At Achrann and father of Hayna.
- Kelly Macdonald as Pokkit: A freelance gun for hire and former partner of Jod's.

=== Other co-stars ===
- M. J. Kang as Garree, one of KB's mothers. She is worried KB may not come back alive because she has very urgent medical needs.
- Cass Buggé as Maree, one of KB's mothers.
- Fred Tatasciore as the voice of Brutus, a Shistavanen member of Jod's pirate crew who led a mutiny against him and took over. Stephen Oyoung serves as the performance artist for Brutus.
- Jaleel White as Gunter, a human pirate
- Dale Soules as Chaelt, a human pirate
- Marti Matulis as Vane, a Nikto pirate previously seen on The Mandalorian.
- Sisa Grey as Kona, a human pirate
- Dominic Burgess as Beef, a humanoid pirate of indeterminate species
- John Hodgman as the voice of Snobbius Snee, a Keteerian pirate. Jasper Anderson serves as the performance artist for Snobbius Snee.
- Mike Estes as the performance artist of Pax, a Gran pirate
- Geneva Carr as the voice of Nooma, a Myykian who is Neel's mother. Dawn Dininger serves as the performance artist for Nooma.
- Carey Jones as the performance artist of Nol, a Myykian who is Neel's father.
- Paloma Garcia-Lee as Melna, a Theelin female on Port Borgo who is concerned about the children's presence there.
- Alan Resnick as Tuut Orial, a pirate merchant on Port Borgo.
- Anthony Atamanuik as the voice of an unidentified fry cook on Port Borgo. David St. Pierre serves as the performance artist for the unidentified fry cook.
- John Gemberling as the voice of a greasy pirate customer on Port Borgo. Dane DiLiegro serves as the performance artist for the greasy pirate customer.
- Alfred Molina as the voice of Benjar Pranic, an Ishi Tib pirate. Alexander Ward serves as the performance artist for Benjar Pranic.
- Julie Ann Emery as the Hotelier, the manager of the spa and hotel on Lanupa.
- Patrick Seitz as the voice of Cthallops, a large unidentified alien patron on Lanupa who helps Jod's group get into Tak Rennod's hidden base.
- Jacob Roanhaus as Glerb, a Quarren pirate.
- Sydney Rose Walker as Sweeda, a Weequay pirate.
- Stephen Fry as the voice of the Supervisor, a large droid who is the ruler of At Attin.

== Episodes ==
No.	Title	Directed by	Written by	Original release date
1	"This Could Be a Real Adventure"	Jon Watts	Christopher Ford & Jon Watts	December 2, 2024
Somewhere in outer space, Captain Silvo leads a raid on a ship. When no currency is found in the vault, his crew member Brutus incites a mutiny. On the fairly modern planet of At Attin, Wim and his Myykian friend Neel prepare to take aptitude exams to determine their future. Wim implies that he wishes he were a Jedi, despite Neel's retort that that would be impossible. Meanwhile, truant students Fern and KB spend most of their time riding a hoverbike around town. When Wim misses the bus, he takes his own bike but falls into a ditch, where he discovers what he thinks is a Jedi temple. He is found by a droid who takes him to school but is subsequently admonished by his workaholic father, Wendle, who tells him that he needs to make up for the exam. Wim convinces Neel to visit the "temple" with him, with Fern (who overheard his claim) and KB following as well. The group finds a hatch and enters, only to learn that it is really a long-abandoned spaceship. Wim pushes a button that activates the ship, lifting them away. Wendle watches in horror as the ship takes his son and friends deep into space.
2	"Way, Way Out Past the Barrier"	David Lowery	Christopher Ford & Jon Watts	December 2, 2024
The kids meet the ship's pilot, an aging droid named SM-33 who does not realize that his captain is long gone. Fern convinces him that she is his new captain, and he takes them to a nearby outpost, as At Attin is not on any map. The kids venture through the outpost and accidentally split up, during which Wim uses his "lunch money" to buy food only to learn that his currency is considered very valuable. When he tells the locals that he is from At Attin, everyone laughs as they tell him that "At Attin" is the name of a lost planet that holds a hidden treasure. A gang of pirates try to seize the kids by force to enslave them. SM-33 intervenes and tries to protect the children but is quickly overwhelmed and gunned down. Brutus has the children thrown in the brig. Down there, they meet another prisoner who introduces himself as Jod Na Nawood: a force-sensitive man with some usable knowledge. Wim, believing him to be a Jedi, agrees to work together so they can escape, with Jod offering to take the kids back to their ship as long as he gets to come with them.
3	"Very Interesting, as an Astrogation Problem"	David Lowery	Christopher Ford & Jon Watts	December 10, 2024
On At Attin, Wendle, Fern's mother Fara, Neel's mother Nooma, and KB's parents Maree and Garree are told that because the kids have left the planet, it is beyond the Supervisor's jurisdiction, and he will not rescue them. Jod helps the kids escape the brig, but they refuse to leave without SM-33, forcing him to go back and rescue him as the pirate Benjar Pranic identifies Jod as Silvo. They outwit the pirates and flee. Fern refuses to trust Jod, Wim and Neel are convinced that he is a real Jedi, and KB reluctantly admits that he is their only hope of getting home. Jod takes the kids to meet his "friend" Kh'ymm, a map expert and fence that even he doesn't trust. Kh'ymm refers to Jod as "Crimson Jack" before revealing that At Attin is among a series of legendary planets that conceal themselves from outsiders to protect their riches. She prints the coordinates, but Jod realizes that she was stalling for the authorities to arrive and takes the kids with him on their ship off-world. Jod finally admits that he is not a Jedi but agrees that they must work together to get what they want. X-Wing Commander Kent interrogates Kh'ymm about the group's whereabouts as she quotes "if I told you, you wouldn't believe me".
4	"Can't Say I Remember No At Attin"	Daniel Kwan and Daniel Scheinert	Christopher Ford & Jon Watts	December 17, 2024
The crew use Kh'ymm's coordinates to arrive at, what they believe to be, At Attin. The planet turns out to resemble a war-torn version of it, and later they learn that they are actually on At Achrann, one of the sister planets. Jod stays on the ship with SM-33 while the kids venture out. They run into soldiers who identify themselves as Troiks, a clan engaged in a bitter blood feud with the Hattans, who have stolen their Eopies. Neel befriends a young girl soldier named Hayna, whose father General Strix insists that the children be treated like adults. Neel does not take to the Troiks and their violent lifestyle, preferring a more humane approach. The kids are to aid the Troiks in getting their Eopies back, but Jod and SM-33 instead buy them back from the Hattans. As a reward, they are directed to the "Fallen Sanctum" which resembles the Supervisor's tower on At Attin. The crew find that it contains the coordinates to other similar planets, but At Attin's has been scratched out. SM-33 reveals that he destroyed it, but his memory has been wiped. Fern orders him to remember and he reveals that At Attin is where the former captain hid his treasure. Suddenly, SM-33 attacks the group as his confession triggers a hidden order to protect the treasure. Jod disables him and Neel faints after helping to save his friends.
5	"You Have a Lot to Learn About Pirates"	Jake Schreier	Myung Joh Wesner	December 24, 2024
On At Attin, the parents desperately try to send a message beyond the barrier, but this attempt is foiled by the Supervisor's droid. After ordering the droid to delete what it learned from its memory, Fara admits to Wendle that they have to go behind the Supervisor's back. The Crew manage to restrain SM-33 and alter his programming to prevent him from turning on them. He reveals that the hidden treasure belonged to famed pirate Tak Rennod, meaning that the ship they are on is the Onyx Cinder. SM-33 agrees to take them to Rennod's former base, deep within the famed luxury planet Lanupa. Jod and the children enter the planet in disguise; unbeknownst to them Pokkit, Jod's former partner, outs his location to Brutus. With help from the patron Cthallops, the Crew make their way deep into Lanupa's hidden caves, maneuvering through booby traps until they find the hidden base. They find the coordinates to At Attin and learn that the "treasure" is an Old Republic Mint. Overcome with greed, Jod challenges Fern for the captaincy, and with a cutlass to her throat, urges her to yield. Wim, with a lightsaber in hand that he found in the treasure pile, threatens Jod, but drops the weapon when he proves unable to wield it. Fern eventually yields, but the children escape when Wim activates a booby trap, dropping them out of sight. Jod finds the lightsaber and activates it for himself.
6	"Zero Friends Again"	Bryce Dallas Howard	Myung Joh Wesner	December 31, 2024
Jod and SM-33 are captured by the pirates and Pokkit. The pirates take Jod and SM-33 back to Brutus for execution. Meanwhile, the children drop out of Rennod's lair into the bottom of the resort. KB reveals she memorized At Attin's coordinates. A subsequent argument over how to reach the Onyx Cinder results in Fern and Neel trying to ascend the mountain while Wim and KB follows a group of seemingly benevolent trash crabs. Jod saves himself and SM-33 by bribing Brutus with the location of At Attin. Midway, KB's cybernetics suffer a malfunction from environmental corrosion, forcing Wim to fix them. Fern and Neel recover the Onyx Cinder and save their friends before they are devoured by the carnivorous trash crabs. Soon, the ship is pinned by a garbage machine, forcing the children to purge the hull, revealing a sleeker ship beneath as they depart Lanupa.
7	"We're Gonna Be in So Much Trouble"	Lee Isaac Chung	Christopher Ford & Jon Watts	January 7, 2025
The parents send a transmitter into outer space but are discovered by the security droids. The pirates arrive at At Attin at the same time as the Onyx Cinder, resulting in the latter's capture. The pirate Glerb is sent into the barrier, but his ship is destroyed by its defenses. Realizing the Onyx Cinder is the key to bypassing the planet's defensive barrier, Jod kills Brutus when the children incapacitate him, resumes his former captaincy, and tells the pirates to conceal themselves until he obtains the location of the planet's vaults. The children manage to use the pirate code to get SM-33 to turn on Jod so they can escape, but Jod stows aboard the Onyx Cinder, decapitates SM-33, and threatens the children into silence. To their surprise, the barrier recognizes the Onyx Cinder as an At Attin ship. As the security droids question the parents, the Supervisor is heard announcing the arrival of a Republic Emissary. Jod poses as the Republic Emissary to gain access to At Attin's vaults. The children are briefly reunited with their parents before Jod approaches them with his lightsaber activated.
8	"The Real Good Guys"	Jon Watts	Christopher Ford & Jon Watts	January 14, 2025
Jod continues to pose as the Republic Emissary. He orders Wim, Neel and KB to be confined to their quarters while he takes Fern and Fara to meet the Supervisor, who is revealed to be a massive droid. When the Supervisor confronts Jod about his contradicting claims about being both a Jedi and a Republic Emissary, revealing to have learned of Order 66, Jod is forced to destroy the Supervisor. This causes a blackout in the city and shuts down the safety droids. As the pirates invade At Attin with the intent of enslaving the populace, Wim, Wendle, Neel and KB race to the Onyx Cinder. With the ship locked in place, Wim and Wendle devise a plan to distract Jod so Wendle can restore power. This enables KB and a repaired SM-33 to launch and fly the ship past the barrier and call Kh'ymm for help. Shortly after, the Onyx Cinder is shot down by the pirates. Meanwhile on At Attin, Wim, Wendle, Fern and Fara all tussle with Jod. While Wim and Fern separate Jod from his lightsaber, Wendle and a reluctant Fara destroy the barrier. This allows the New Republic forces to arrive and deal with the pirates, shooting down their ship and forcing Jod to admit defeat. Everyone then races to the Onyx Cinder crash site to find KB alive and well. Wim looks up to the sky in amazement at the New Republic ships arriving on At Attin as power is restored.

== Production ==
=== Development ===
In February 2022, Production Weekly revealed the existence of an upcoming, untitled Star Wars series that was being developed under the working title Grammar Rodeo. Jon Watts was reportedly being considered to direct at least one episode of the series, with Jon Favreau serving as an executive producer after creating the Star Wars series The Mandalorian. The new series was reported to be set during the High Republic era, with a formal announcement planned for Star Wars Celebration in May 2022. In mid-May, Watts and Christopher Ford were revealed to have created the series, with the pair executive producing and Ford serving as writer. The series was also revealed to be set after the events of Return of the Jedi (1983), the same time period in which The Mandalorian is set, and was described as a "galactic version of classic [Amblin Entertainment] coming-of-age adventure films of the '80s".

Watts initially pitched the series as a film right after the release of his Marvel Cinematic Universe (MCU) film Spider-Man: Homecoming (2017), but his commitments with Marvel Studios delayed the project until he was finished with his work on Spider-Man: Far From Home (2019) and Spider-Man: No Way Home (2021). This period saw Favreau's creation of The Mandalorian, which influenced Watts's decision to produce the project as a television series, which he would begin upon completion of No Way Home. During Star Wars Celebration at the end of May 2022, the series' title was revealed to be Star Wars: Skeleton Crew. Dave Filoni was serving as an executive producer after doing the same on The Mandalorian and its other spin-off series alongside Favreau. Another executive producer, Lucasfilm president Kathleen Kennedy, explained that Watts had approached her about making a Star Wars series inspired by the Amblin film The Goonies (1985). Kennedy, who had served as an executive producer on that film and as co-founder of Amblin Entertainment, said Skeleton Crew "evolved out of that kind of enthusiasm in wanting to tell stories in this space". Favreau felt that when Watts and Ford had pitched the series to Kennedy, they were "speaking right to the person who was there and knows the 11 herbs and spices that go into it". Ford said Kennedy told them that she never thought of Amblin's films as being for kids, but rather being stories that "just happen to be about kids, a story of a kid going on an adventure". This inspired him to develop the show for audiences of all ages.

In March 2023, Daniel Kwan and Daniel Scheinert, as well as David Lowery were revealed to have directed an episode each. The following month, Jake Schreier, Bryce Dallas Howard, and Lee Isaac Chung were announced as additional directors. By August 2024, Watts and Ford were considered to be showrunners of the series. Colin Wilson also executive produces, with Susan McNamara and John Bartnicki as producers.

=== Writing ===
Myung Joh Wesner also serves as writer on the series, alongside Ford and Watts. Skeleton Crew was confirmed to occur within the same time frame as The Mandalorian and Ahsoka, referencing those series along with the Star Wars films. Ford had described Skeleton Crew's tone as being an "adventure", desiring to make it an enjoyable series, but also containing danger. He had further gone on to say that the situation would be "extra fraught" when the kids were in danger. Jude Law had said that his character was "a lot of the world that they experience: contradictory, and at times a place of nurture and other times a place of threat" and that the series would be conveyed through the perspective of the children. Law had also concurred with Ford in agreeing that the series would also depict danger, calling the relationship between the children and adults a "goofy relationship ... And then other times it's really quite dark and quite scary". He added that he and the young cast were "in constant state of confusion and jeopardy and challenge", with Skeleton Crew depicting them working together to overcome those fears. Favreau had also wanted the series to convey many tones that "reflects the storyteller of the filmmaker", which had been the same method he had used when working on The Mandalorian.

=== Design ===
Louise Mingenbach serves as the costume designer.

=== Casting ===
With the February 2022 reports, it was believed the series was looking for four children, about 10 years old and one 30-to-40-year-old actor as its series regulars. Casting of the four pre-teen actors was still underway in May 2022, with Law revealed to be cast in the lead role, reported to be a Force-user, at the end of the month. In April 2023, Ravi Cabot-Conyers, Kyriana Kratter, Robert Timothy Smith, and Ryan Kiera Armstrong were revealed as the series' lead children, with Tunde Adebimpe and Kerry Condon also starring. The next month, Jaleel White revealed that he would appear in the series as a pirate. In July 2024, the series' key characters were revealed: Law portrays Jod Na Nawood, with Cabot-Conyers as Wim, Kratter as KB, Smith as Neel, and Armstrong as Fern. Nick Frost was also revealed to be voicing a droid in the series named SM-33.

=== Filming ===
Principal photography had been happening for "a few weeks" by early September 2022, at Manhattan Beach Studios in Los Angeles County, under the working title Grammar Rodeo (a reference to The Simpsons's episode "Bart on the Road"). Filming was previously scheduled to take place from June to December. Sean Porter, David Klein, and Paul Hughen served as cinematographers. The series utilized the StageCraft Volume technology in addition to stop-motion animation, headed by Phil Tippett, and matte paintings with one of Industrial Light & Magic's former painters coming out of retirement to work on the paintings. Lowery said his episode included a member of the Teek species from the television film Ewoks: The Battle for Endor (1985) who was created using a puppet; Lowery enjoyed the combination of puppetry, which he called "the most ancient technology", and the series' other cutting-edge effects. Filming officially wrapped on January 22, 2023.

=== Post-production ===
Andrew S. Eisen serves as an editor on the series. Eisen previously worked on The Mandalorian and The Book of Boba Fett. John Knoll served as the visual effects supervisor, with Industrial Light & Magic, DNEG, Image Engine, Tippett Studio, BOT VFX, and Cantina Creative providing visual effects.

== Music ==
In November 2024, Mick Giacchino was revealed to have composed the score for the series. His father, Michael Giacchino, previously composed the score for the Star Wars film Rogue One (2016) as well as Watts's Marvel Cinematic Universe Spider-Man films. Mick wanted the main theme for Skeleton Crew to "capture that feeling of being a kid, looking out at the twin suns, and knowing that there's an adventure out there waiting for you". It consists of a simple chord sequence arranged for "harps and synths to create this kind of whimsical floating feeling". Watts associated the opening four chords of the theme with the four main characters. The score was recorded at the Newman Scoring Stage at the Fox Studio Lot.

All music is composed by Mick Giacchino.

Star Wars: Skeleton Crew (Original Soundtrack)
No.	Title	Length
1.	"Skeleton Crew End Credits"	4:06
2.	"Galaxy's Worst Boarding Party"	3:00
3.	"Homeward Frowns"	1:23
4.	"Fernetic Ride"	0:42
5.	"Wimsical Thinking"	1:57
6.	"Shortcut"	1:57
7.	"Last Ditch Effort"	1:08
8.	"Fall Guys"	1:01
9.	"Open Sesame"	3:11
10.	"Awakening the Onyx Cinder"	2:13
11.	"It's a Starship?!"	2:54
12.	"Lost in Hyperspace"	0:39
13.	"Aye, Robot Part I"	1:58
14.	"Aye, Robot Part II"	2:43
15.	"Far from Home"	1:35
16.	"Port Borgo"	1:46
17.	"Not on At Attin Anymore"	3:33
18.	"Soup's Up"	0:55
19.	"Rock 'em Sock 'em Robot"	2:13
20.	"The Eye Rat's Prison Break"	0:43
21.	"Illusions of Grandeur"	1:58
22.	"The Kids Are Not Alright"	2:32
23.	"No Droid Left Behind"	2:45
24.	"Hyper Escape"	2:38
25.	"Up to Na Wood"	2:06
26.	"Kh'ymm's Observatory"	3:49
27.	"Crimson Jack's Mad Dash"	6:16
28.	"School's Out Forever"	3:08
29.	"Neel and Hayna"	1:29
30.	"Hayna's Farewell"	2:42
31.	"Malfunction Junction"	5:02
32.	"Arrival on Lanupa"	1:28
33.	"Death Will Be Swift"	3:35
34.	"The Pirate Den"	3:28
35.	"Jod Takes the Wheel"	2:50
36.	"Treasure Planet"	2:58
37.	"KB or Not KB"	5:15
38.	"Crab Attack"	2:04
39.	"Saving the Onyx Cinder"	5:12
40.	"Launching the Communication Buoy"	2:28
41.	"Storm Chasers"	2:55
42.	"Fear of Jod"	1:56
43.	"Message in a Holo"	2:05
44.	"Into the Storm"	3:25
45.	"Homecoming"	6:30
46.	"At Attin Down the Hatches"	6:06
47.	"Infiltrating the Tower Part I"	5:01
48.	"Infiltrating the Tower Part II"	4:09
49.	"Paradise Lost and Finale"	4:31
50.	"Suite from Star Wars: Skeleton Crew"	8:28
Total length:		2:28:00

== Release ==
The first footage for Star Wars: Skeleton Crew was revealed at Star Wars Celebration London in April 2023. The first official trailer and key art was released that August at Disney's D23 convention.

Skeleton Crew premiered on Disney+ on December 2, 2024, with its first two episodes. The other six episodes were released weekly from December 10 to January 14, 2025. A 2023 premiere was first announced at Star Wars Celebration in May 2022, with White expecting the series to be released in November or December of that year. By late 2023, Skeleton Crew was set to be released in 2024, with a United States Copyright Office filing for the first episode indicating an approximate release in January. By July 2024, the series was set to premiere on December 3, 2024, but in November, it was moved up a day to the December 2 date.

== Reception ==
=== Viewership ===
Screen Engine/ASI, which tracks the top ten most-mentioned entertainment options through a survey of over 1,000 consumers, reported that Star Wars: Skeleton Crew was the tenth most-mentioned title from December 28 to January 3, 2025, with 1.5% of all mentions. Market research company Parrot Analytics, which looks at consumer engagement in consumer research, streaming, downloads, and on social media, reported that Skeleton Crew was in the top ten digital originals chart in Canada during the week of December 30 to January 5. It achieved a demand average of 23.7 times more than the average TV series in Canada, securing the No. 10 spot on the chart. The series remained in the Canadian top ten for the following week, ranking No. 8 with a demand average of 23.7. In the week of January 13–19, Skeleton Crew again placed No. 8 on Parrot Analytics' Canadian Top 10 Digital Originals chart, with a demand average of 25.5.

The streaming aggregator Reelgood, which tracks real-time data from 20 million U.S. users for original and acquired content across SVOD and AVOD services, reported that Star Wars: Skeleton Crew was the eight most-streamed series in the U.S. for the week ending December 18, 2024. The series ranked as the No. 2 program on Disney+'s Top 10 list—a daily updated list of the platform's most-watched titles—by December 29. Whip Media, which tracks viewership data for the more than 25 million worldwide users of its TV Time app, announced that Skeleton Crew was the fourth most-streamed original series in the U.S. for the week ending December 8. The series remained in the top ten from December 22 to January 19. TVision, using its Power Score to evaluate CTV programming through viewership and engagement across over 1,000 apps, estimated that it was the most-streamed show from December 2–8. It remained among the top ten most-streamed series from December 9 through the week of January 19. The series subsequently moved to the top 20 for the week ending January 26.

Luminate, which gathers viewership data from certain smart TVs in the U.S., calculated that Skeleton Crew was streamed for 914 million minutes in 2024. Nielsen Media Research, which records streaming viewership on U.S. television screens, estimated that Skeleton Crew garnered 6.3 million viewers in the U.S. over its first 35 days, making it one of the most popular series of the 2024–2025 season.

=== Critical response ===
On the review aggregator website Rotten Tomatoes, 92% of 151 critics' reviews are positive, with an average rating of 7.6/10. The website's critic consensus reads, "Evoking childlike wonder, Skeleton Crew is a swashbuckling Star Wars adventure that refreshingly keeps things simple." On Metacritic, which uses a weighted average, the series holds a score of 72 out of 100, based on 23 critics, indicating "generally favorable" reviews.

Alison Herman of Variety wrote, "Skeleton Crew takes Star Wars to new places only in the literal sense. But the show is able to nail its limited brief, and make a Star Wars show that's actually rooted in childhood rather than evoking memories of one's own." Daniel Fienberg of The Hollywood Reporter wrote, "The generally low-stakes, thematically light, young-skewing romp takes us into under-explored corners of the seemingly boundless galaxy while feeling pleasantly familiar." Kelly Lawler of USA Today wrote, "What stands out most when watching the series is that it feels so very influenced; it's not just a Star Wars series, it's Star Wars plus something. It's gimmicky and not just a little cookie-cutter in its expansion of the sci-fi franchise, which gets diluted the more shows Disney+ cranks out."

In a mixed review, Ben Travers of IndieWire wrote, "Star Wars: Skeleton Crew gets off to a depressingly familiar start, while bungling the introduction of its primary protagonists and generally plodding along until Jude Law pops up." Zach Handlen of The Boston Globe wrote, "All of these assets are buried under one problem: this is a premise that doesn't know how to be a TV show yet."

=== Accolades ===
Accolades received by Star Wars: Skeleton Crew
Award	Year	Category	Recipient(s)	Result	Ref.
Children's and Family Emmy Awards	2025	Outstanding Young Teen Series	Jon Favreau, Dave Filoni, Christopher Ford, Kathleen Kennedy, Jon Watts, and Colin Wilson (executive producers); Carrie Beck, Chris Buongiorno, and Karen Gilchrist (co-executive producers); John Bartnicki and Susan McNamara (producers)	Won	
Children's and Family Emmy Awards	2025	Outstanding Lead Performer in a Preschool, Children's or Young Teen Program	Jude Law	Nominated	
Children's and Family Emmy Awards	2025	Outstanding Younger Performer in a Preschool, Children's or Young Teen Program	Ravi Cabot-Conyers	Nominated	
Children's and Family Emmy Awards	2025	Outstanding Writing for a Young Teen Series	Christopher Ford and Jon Watts (for "This Could Be a Real Adventure")	Nominated	
Children's and Family Emmy Awards	2025	Outstanding Directing for a Live Action Series	Jon Watts (for "This Could Be a Real Adventure")	Nominated	
Children's and Family Emmy Awards	2025	Outstanding Cinematography and Technical Arts for a Single Camera Live Action Program	Sean Porter Campbell (for "This Could Be a Real Adventure")	Nominated	
Children's and Family Emmy Awards	2025	Outstanding Editing for a Young Teen Live Action Program	Andrew S. Eisen (for "The Real Good Guys")	Won	
Children's and Family Emmy Awards	2025	Outstanding Editing for a Young Teen Live Action Program	Katheryn Naranjo (for "We're Gonna Be in So Much Trouble")	Nominated	
Children's and Family Emmy Awards	2025	Outstanding Editing for a Young Teen Live Action Program	Terel Gibson (for "You Have a Lot to Learn About Pirates")	Nominated	
Children's and Family Emmy Awards	2025	Outstanding Sound Mixing and Sound Editing for a Live Action Program	Devendra Cleary (production mixer); Tony Villaflor and Bonnie Wild (re-recording mixers); Trey Turner and Matthew Wood (supervising sound editors); Warren Brown and Luke Dennis (music editors); David Chrastka and Richard Gould (sound effects editors); Shaun Farley, Joel Raabe, and Frank Rinella (foley editors); Sean England, Alyssa Nevarez, Margie O'Malley, and Andrea Stelter Gard (foley artists); Angela Ang and Brad Semenoff (dialog / ADR Editors); David W. Collins (sound designer) (for "You Have a Lot to Learn About Pirates")	Won	
Children's and Family Emmy Awards	2025	Outstanding Art Direction / Set Decoration / Scenic Design	Doug Chiang and Oliver Scholl (production designers); William Budge, Kevin Gilbert, Erik Osusky, Rachel Rockstroh, and Dustin James Tiberend (art directors); Gene Serdena (set decorator); Chris Arnold, Dawn Brown, Dan Jennings, Joseph Ramiro, Walter Schneider, Julie Vash, and Brian Waits (set designers); David Lazan (supervising art director) (for "You Have a Lot to Learn About Pirates")	Nominated	
Children's and Family Emmy Awards	2025	Outstanding Costume Design / Styling	Dan Bronson (costume supervisor); Louise Mingenbach (costume designer); Cindy Rosenthal (key costumer); Karen Mason (specialty costumer) (for "Way, Way Out Past the Barrier")	Nominated	
Children's and Family Emmy Awards	2025	Outstanding Hairstyling and Makeup	Matt Danon, Richard Dealba, Roxane Griffin, Margarita Pidgeon, Gail Ryan, and Jackie Zavala (hairstylists); Veronica Rodarte, Michelle Sfarzo, and Adina Sullivan (makeup artists); Nanxy Tong (assistant hair department head), Sonia Cabrera (assistant makeup department head); Lane Friedman (hair designer); Samantha Ward (makeup designer); Bruce Spaulding Fuller, Crystal Gomez, Ian Goodwin, Mike Mekash, Ana Gabriela Quinonez Urrego, and Scott Stoddard (prosthetic makeup artists); Alexei Dmitriew and Cristina Waltz (prosthetic makeup co-department heads) (for "Zero Friends Again")	Nominated	
Children's and Family Emmy Awards	2025	Outstanding Show Open	Karin Fong and Tosh Kodama (creative directors); Jorge Artola (illustrator); Mick Giacchino (composer); Faraz Abbasi, Jens Mebes, Izik Roitman, and Alex Rupert (animators); Henry Chang and Merrill Hall (art director / animators); Lexi Gunvaldson (editor); Doug Chiang (lead illustrator)	Nominated	
Children's and Family Emmy Awards	2025	Outstanding Visual Effects for a Live Action Program	Shawn Kelly (animation supervisor); Abbigail Keller and Pablo Molles (production visual effects producers); John Knoll (production visual effects supervisor); Nicole Matteson (VFX producer); Jeff Capogreco, Bobo Skipper, and Andy Walker (VFX supervisors); Christopher Balog (virtual production supervisor); Joseph Kasparian and Eddie Pasquarello (visual effects supervisors)	Won	
Children's and Family Emmy Awards	2025	Outstanding Casting for a Live Action Program	Sarah Halley Finn and Rachel Nadler	Nominated	
Children's and Family Emmy Awards	2025	Outstanding Stunt Coordination for a Live Action Program	George Cottle and Colin Follenweide	Nominated	
Guild of Music Supervisors Awards	2025	Best Music Supervision in a Trailer (Series)	Vanessa Jorge Perry	Nominated	
Kids' Choice Awards	2025	Favorite Family TV Show	Star Wars: Skeleton Crew	Nominated	
Kids' Choice Awards	2025	Favorite Male TV Star (Family)	Jude Law	Nominated	
Kids' Choice Awards	2025	Favorite Female TV Star (Family)	Ryan Kiera Armstrong	Nominated	
Make-Up Artists & Hair Stylists Guild Awards	2025	Best Makeup in Children and Teen Programming	Samantha Ward, Sonia Cabrera, Cristina Waltz, Alexei Dmitriew, and Adina Sullivan	Won	
Make-Up Artists & Hair Stylists Guild Awards	2025	Best Hair Styling in Children and Teen Programming	Lane Friedman, Nanxy Tong-Heater, Richard DeAlba, and Roxane Griffin	Won	
Saturn Awards	2026	Best New Genre Television Series	Star Wars: Skeleton Crew	Nominated	
Saturn Awards	2026	Best Supporting Actor in a Television Series	Jude Law	Nominated	
Saturn Awards	2026	Best Young Performer in a Television Series	Ravi Cabot-Conyers	Won	
Visual Effects Society Awards	2024	Outstanding Visual Effects in a Photoreal Episode	John Knoll, Pablo Molles, Jhon Alvarado, and Jeff Capogreco (for "You Have a Lot to Learn About Pirates")	Nominated	
Visual Effects Society Awards	2024	Outstanding Effects Simulations in an Episode, Commercial, Game Cinematic or Real-Time Project	Travis Harkleroad, Xiaolong Peng, Marcella Brown, and Mickael Riciotti (for "This Could Be a Real Adventure" – "Spaceship Hillside Takeoff")	Nominated	
Visual Effects Society Awards	2024	Outstanding Compositing and Lighting in an Episode	Rich Grande, Tomas Lefebvre, Ian Dodman, and Rey Reynolds (for "Zero Friends Again" – "Jaws")	Nominated	
