= Clown (film) =

2014 horror film directed by Jon Watts

- Theatrical release poster
- Directed by: Jon Watts
- Written by: Christopher Ford; Jon Watts
- Produced by: Mac Cappuccino; Eli Roth; Cody Ryder
- Starring: Eli Roth; Laura Allen; Christian Distefano; Andy Powers; Peter Stormare
- Cinematography: Matthew Santo
- Edited by: Robert Ryang
- Music by: Matt Veligdan
- Production companies: Cross Creek Pictures; PS 260; Vertebra Films; Zed Filmworks; Method Studios; Dragonfly Entertainment
- Distributed by: Dimension Films
- Release dates: November 13, 2014 (Italy); June 17, 2016 (United States)
- Running time: 100 minutes
- Country: United States
- Language: English
- Budget: $1.5 million
- Box office: $4.4 million

Clown is a 2014 American body horror film directed by Jon Watts in his feature directorial debut, produced by Mac Cappuccino, Eli Roth, and Cody Ryder, and written by Watts and Christopher Ford. It stars Eli Roth, Laura Allen, Andy Powers, and Peter Stormare and follows an estate agent who wanted to perform on his son's birthday only to realize that the clown suit he wore became cursed. Visual effects for the clown monster were done by Jagdeep Khoza, Alterian, Inc., and Tony Gardner. Principal photography began in November 2012, in Ottawa. The film was released in Italy on November 13, 2014, in the United Kingdom on March 2, 2015, and in the United States on June 17, 2016, by Dimension Films. The film received mixed reviews from critics.

== Plot ==
Kent McCoy, a real estate agent, steps in to entertain at his son Jack’s birthday party after the hired clown cancels. He discovers an old clown costume in the basement of a house he is renovating and wears it to the party. Afterward, Kent is unable to remove the costume. The fabric adheres to his body, the nose fuses to his face, and attempts to take it off cause injury.

Over the next several days, Kent undergoes disturbing physical and behavioral changes, including an insatiable hunger. He contacts Herbert Karlsson, the former owner of the house, who reveals that the costume is made from the skin and hair of an ancient Nordic demon called the Clöyne. The demon possesses the wearer and feeds on five children, one for every month of winter. Over the centuries, the Clöyne was forgotten and became the inspiration for clowns. Karlsson warns Kent that the only way to stop the transformation is suicide or decapitation. Karlsson then drugs Kent and attempts to kill him, but fails.

Kent’s attempts to end his own life fail while the Clöyne’s influence grows stronger. He hides in an abandoned property and when a child encounters him, Kent accidentally kills the boy, but then devours him. Realizing the danger he poses, Kent begs his wife, Meg, to chain him in the basement. After Jack confides that he is being bullied, Kent persuades his son to release him and then murders the bully to satisfy the demon’s hunger.

Meg learns from Karlsson that the only way to free Kent is by allowing the demon to consume five children. Karlsson admits to once wearing the suit, and that after he and his brother fed children to the demon in order to free Karlsson, they tried to destroy the suit but failed. Kent, now fully possessed, kills two more children at a local Chuck E. Cheese. Meg is tempted to sacrifice another child (the last of the five) to save Jack, but changes her mind upon realizing the demon is now hunting her son.

In the final confrontation, Kent—now the Clöyne—attacks Meg and Jack. Meg manages to injure the demon and temporarily subdue it. When it lunges for Jack, she decapitates it, killing both the Clöyne and Kent. As she embraces her son, the costume melts away, revealing Kent's severed head. The film ends with the cursed costume and Kent's possessions being packed away in an evidence locker by police.

== Cast ==
- Andy Powers as Kent McCoy, a real estate agent
- Laura Allen as Meg McCoy, Kent's wife
- Eli Roth as Frowny the Clown / Clöyne
- Peter Stormare as Herbert Karlsson
- Elizabeth Whitmere as Denise
- Christian Distefano as Jack McCoy, Kent and Meg's son
- Chuck Shamata as Walt
- Robert Reynolds as Dr. Martin Karlsson
- Lucas Kelly as Colton
- Michael Riendeau as Robbie
- Matthew Stefiuk as Detective
- Miller Timlin as Camper

== Production ==
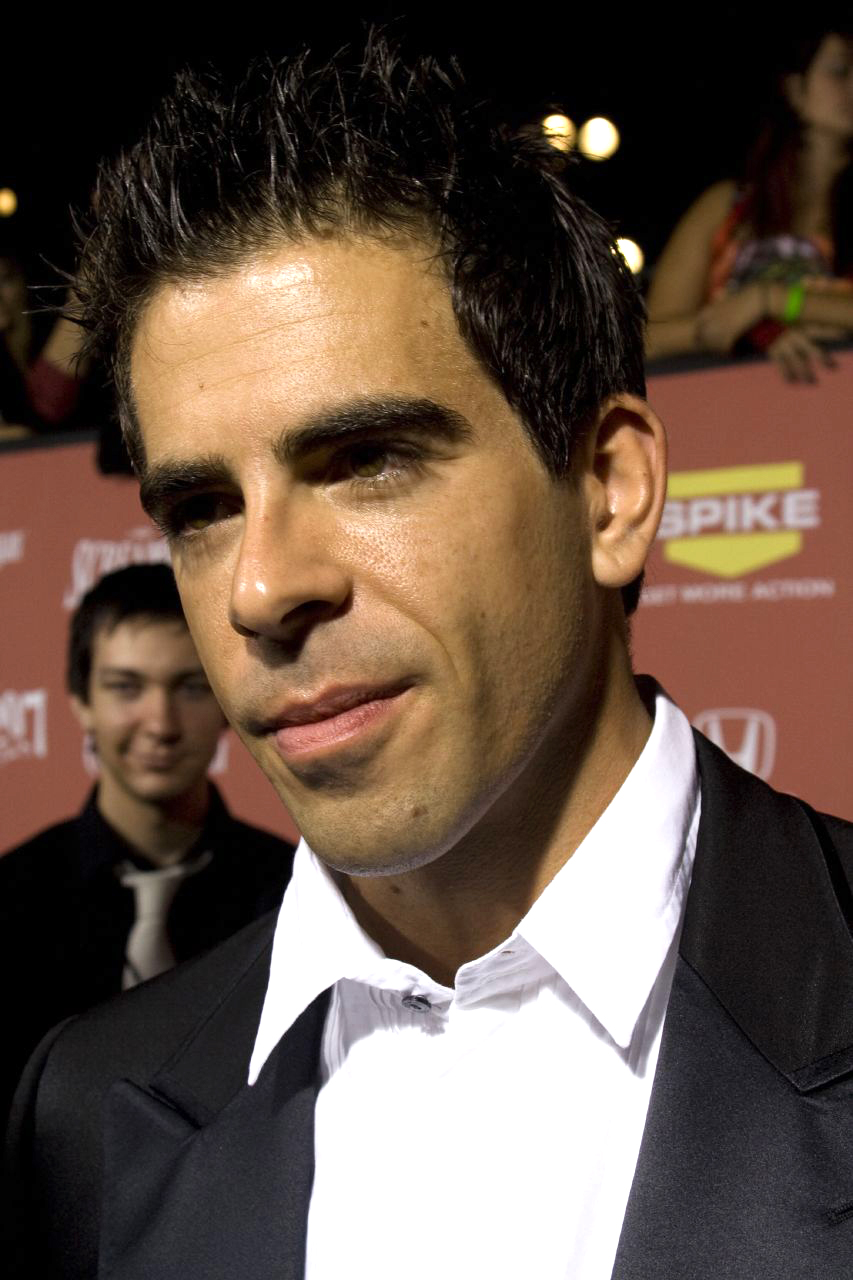
Eli Roth was the film's producer and had a brief cameo as Frowny the Clown

In November 2010, Jon Watts and Christopher Ford uploaded a fake trailer to YouTube that announced Eli Roth would produce the film; Roth was not involved at the time. Roth spoke about the film, saying: "I loved how ballsy they were, issuing a trailer that said, 'From the Master of Horror, Eli Roth.' Some people thought I'd made the movie, or that it was another fake Grindhouse trailer... I really felt these guys deserved a shot, and that people are truly freaked out by evil clowns. It's new territory to make this a version of The Fly, where this guy can feel himself changing, blacking out only to find blood all over his clown suit. You're sympathetic toward a monster until the monster actually takes over."

Principal photography began in November 2012 in Ottawa. Roth joined as a producer, and Watts directed the film based on a screenplay co-written with Ford.

== Music ==
Matt Veligdan composed the film's score, which also featured eight songs.

Clown

Soundtrack album by Matt Veligdan
- Released: December 27, 2014
- Recorded: December 27, 2014
- Genre: Movie soundtrack
- Label: Epic Records
- Producer: Matt Veligdan

- Benjamin Dickinson – "Frowny the Clown"
- Brian McKenna – "Mexican Lindo"
- Jared Gutstadt – "Taste of Mexico"
- Gods of Fire – "The Long Walk"
- Matt Veligdan – "Sonata La Squarzona"
- Neil Sedaka – "King of Clowns"
- Matt Veligdan – "Hardship"
- Nirvana – "Everybody Loves a Clown"

== Release ==
In September 2012, Dimension Films and FilmNation Entertainment acquired distribution rights to the film. The film was released on November 13, 2014 in Italy.

== Home media ==
The UK premiere was February 27, 2015, in Scotland at FrightFest Glasgow 2015, followed by the DVD and Blu-ray release March 2, 2015. The film was also released in the Philippines on March 25, 2015 and in Mexico on May 22, 2015. After being delayed, the film was released in the United States on June 17, 2016. A 4K UltraHD BluRay has been released by Turbine Medien in Germany on November 13th 2025.

== Reception ==
On the review aggregator website Rotten Tomatoes, Clown holds an approval rating of 46% based on 28 reviews, and an average rating of 4.8/10. The website's consensus reads, "Clown tries to bag a stylish, gory thrill, but good practical effects can't save this circus of mediocrity."

Dominic Cuthbert of Starburst rated it 7/10 stars and wrote, "Clown may be formulaic and filled up to the guts with familiar tropes, but it is tremendous fun and an effective body horror." Howard Gorman of Scream magazine rated it 5/5 stars and wrote, "With Clown the filmmakers have created an all-new monster of demonic proportions and it's a concept that certainly deserves to spawn a sequel or two as the sky really is the limit." Jeremy Aspinall of the Radio Times rated it 2/5 stars and described it as "efficiently put together if a little sedate in pace". Anton Bitel of Little White Lies wrote that the film doubles as an equally harrowing story of "a family man's losing struggle with his own paedophiliac impulses". Brad Miska of Bloody Disgusting rated it 3/5 stars and wrote, "Even though it's mostly a bore, there's still some really cool and fun stuff scattered throughout." Keri O'Shea of Brutal as Hell wrote, "Neither frightening nor funny, here's another lesson to prove that fake trailers are often fine just as they are." Joel Harley of HorrorTalk rated it 2/5 stars and wrote, "What could have been one of the few great killer clown movies winds up as yet another disappointment, being too uneven in tone and pace to be considered a success."
