= Dylan McDermott =

American actor (born 1961)

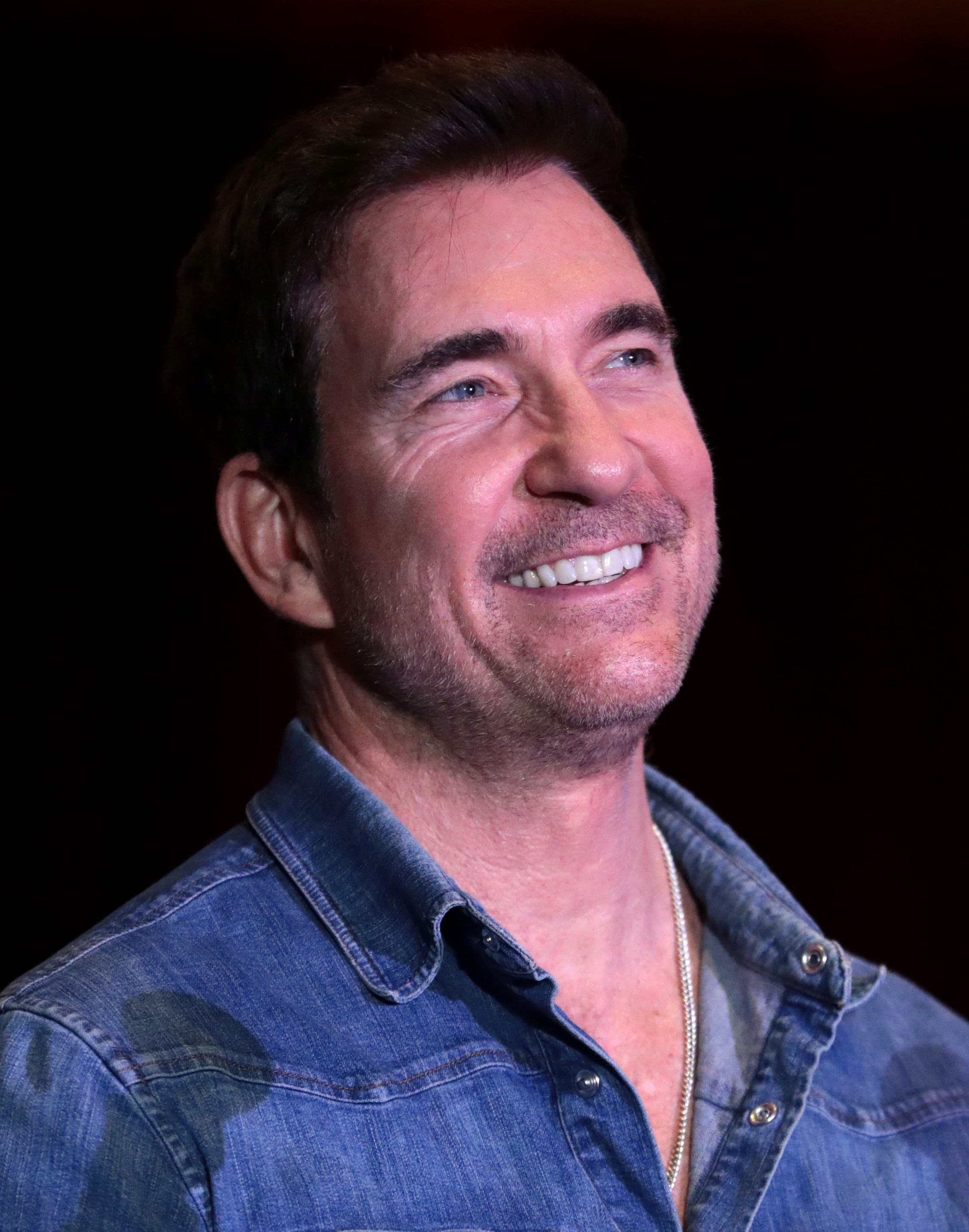
- McDermott in 2023
- Born: Mark Anthony McDermott; October 26, 1961 (age 65); Waterbury, Connecticut, U.S.
- Education: Fordham University (BA); Neighborhood Playhouse School of the Theatre
- Occupation: Actor
- Years active: 1987–present
- Spouse: Shiva Rose (m. 1995; div. 2009)
- Children: 2

Mark Anthony "Dylan" McDermott (born October 26, 1961) is an American actor. He is known for his role as lawyer and law firm head Bobby Donnell on the legal drama series The Practice, which earned him a Golden Globe Award for Best Performance by an Actor in a Television Series – Drama and a nomination for the Primetime Emmy Award for Outstanding Lead Actor in a Drama Series.

McDermott is also known for his roles in four seasons (first, second, eighth and ninth) of the FX horror anthology series American Horror Story, subtitled Murder House, Asylum, Apocalypse, and 1984, portraying Ben Harmon, Johnny Morgan and Bruce, respectively. He also starred as narcotics crime lord Richard Wheatley on the Law & Order: Special Victims Unit spin-off Law & Order: Organized Crime; Lt. Carter Shaw on the TNT series Dark Blue; in two short-lived CBS dramas, Hostages and Stalker; and in the 1994 remake of the film Miracle on 34th Street. In 2022, he joined FBI: Most Wanted as the new lead, replacing the departing Julian McMahon.

== Early life, family and education ==
Mark Anthony McDermott was born on October 26, 1961, in Waterbury, Connecticut, to Diane and Richard McDermott. He has a younger sister, Robin. Diane was 15 and Richard was 17 when McDermott was born. By 1967, the couple had divorced, and Diane and her two children were living with her mother, Avis Marino. On February 9, 1967, Diane died of what was believed for decades to be an accidental gunshot wound.

McDermott and his sister were raised by their maternal grandmother Avis in Waterbury. As a teenager, he began taking trips to visit his biological father, who owned the West Fourth Street Saloon in Greenwich Village, New York City. McDermott worked in his father's bar, serving drinks and breaking up fights.

His father was later a longtime bartender at the Upper East Side restaurant J.G. Melon. He also fast-talked his way into the Mudd Club and Studio 54.

McDermott was uncomfortable with himself as a teenager, saying he had a "Dorothy Hamill hairdo". He began imitating his acting heroes, such as Marlon Brando and Humphrey Bogart, adopting their demeanor. In 1979, McDermott graduated from Holy Cross High School in Waterbury.

McDermott's father's third wife was playwright V (then known as Eve Ensler), who adopted McDermott when he was 15 and she was 23. She later divorced his father. V and McDermott have remained close. She encouraged him to pursue an acting career and began writing roles for him into her plays. After V suffered a miscarriage, McDermott took the name Dylan, the name planned for her unborn child.

In 1983, he graduated from Jesuit-run Fordham University with a BA. He also studied under Sanford Meisner at the Neighborhood Playhouse School of the Theatre in New York City.

== Career ==
McDermott made his screen debut in Hamburger Hill in 1987 before starring in the 1989 film Steel Magnolias opposite Julia Roberts as her husband Jackson Latcherie. He also starred in Twister, a film about a man trying to rescue his girlfriend and daughter from a tornado storm. The same year brought Neon Empire, a film about the rise and fall of one man in Las Vegas. However, his first big break as an actor was in the film In the Line of Fire. Through his connection with Clint Eastwood, McDermott was able to land his first major gig in The Practice. The show, in which he starred from 1997 to 2004, earned him a Golden Globe Award for Best Performance by an Actor in a Television Series – Drama and a nomination for the Primetime Emmy Award for Outstanding Lead Actor in a Drama Series. It also expanded McDermott's stardom, and he made People's list of the "50 Most Beautiful People in the World 1998" with the magazine calling him "a prime-time heartthrob". He got this distinction again in 2000. In 1994, McDermott starred in Miracle on 34th Street as lawyer Bryan Bedford. The Christmas movie remake grossed $46.3 million at the worldwide box office. In 1995, he appeared in the family comedy-drama film Home for the Holidays as business partner Leo Fish.

Despite his success on The Practice, McDermott was cut from the show. Executive producer David E. Kelley cited "economic and creative realities" as a result of pressure from ABC to reduce costs. McDermott did appear in the final two episodes of the final season.

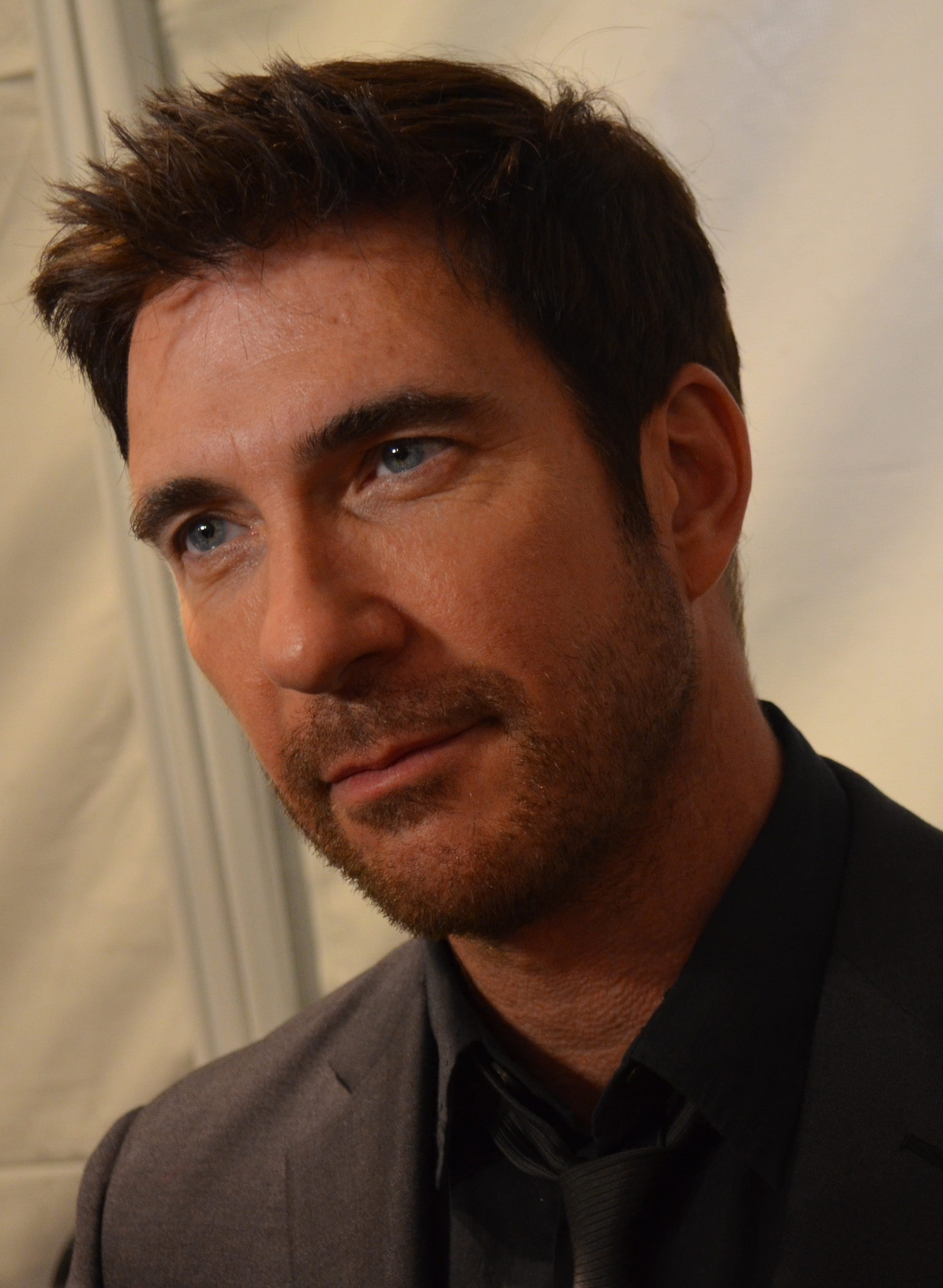
McDermott at the 2012 PaleyFest

In 2004, McDermott starred alongside Julianna Margulies four-part mini-series The Grid, playing FBI Special Agent Max Canary in an anti-terrorist unit. Returning to theater in 2006, the actor played a returned soldier suffering from post-traumatic stress disorder in the Ensler's play The Treatment. In 2007, McDermott played role of Roy Solomon in the supernatural thriller film The Messengers, and starred in the television series Big Shots. Due to low viewership, the show was canceled in January 2008 after 11 episodes without completing the planned 13-episode season. On October 30, 2008, TV Guide reported that McDermott was due to co-star alongside Shannen Doherty in the film Burning Palms, a satire based on Los Angeles stereotypes told through five intertwining storylines.

Beginning in 2009, McDermott starred in the TNT drama Dark Blue, playing a veteran cop who heads a squad of undercover LAPD officers. The show ran for two seasons, each consisting of ten episodes. In 2011, McDermott starred on American Horror Story on FX as Ben Harmon, a psychologist and cheating husband. He returned to the second season as a new character due to the series' anthology format, this time portraying Johnny Morgan. In 2012, he appeared in three films: The Campaign, playing Tim Wattley, a campaign manager, The Perks of Being a Wallflower, as the father of main character Charlie (Logan Lerman), and Nobody Walks, as Leroy. He appeared in the action thriller Olympus Has Fallen (2013) as a treacherous Secret Service Agent who helps a group of terrorists seize control of the White House.

In May 2013, McDermott launched his first photography exhibition in Montreal, Quebec, Canada, at Avenue Art Gallery as part of a collaboration with art agent Marina Cutler. The exhibition, The Dylan Project, Make some Noise!, tied his support for The V-Day Organization and love of photography together as the project is a way to bring attention and funds to this organization that supports women in various ways who have suffered violent acts of aggression. McDermott and Cutler have plans to bring The Dylan Project to other locations. Also in 2013, McDermott starred in the short-lived CBS television series Hostages as FBI agent Duncan Carlisle. In 2014, McDermott began starring on another short-lived CBS television series Stalker in one of the lead roles, Detective Jack Larsen.

In 2018, McDermott played the serial killer Don Burnside in the film The Clovehitch Killer, and in 2019, he had a recurring role on The Politician opposite January Jones, as the father of Lucy Boynton's character. In 2020, McDermott starred in Hollywood, a limited series for Netflix. He then went on to be cast as narcotics crime lord Richard Wheatley on the Elliot Stabler-centric Law & Order: Special Victims Unit spin-off Law & Order: Organized Crime, which premiered in April 2021. In season 1, McDermott as Wheatley was a series regular, but moved to a recurring role for season 2. Coinciding with his departure from Organized Crime, McDermott joined Dick Wolf's FBI: Most Wanted as the new lead following the departure of Julian McMahon. His first episode aired in April 2022.

== Personal life ==
Part Italian, McDermott married actress Shiva Rose on November 19, 1995. They have two daughters, Colette and Charlotte. Colette's birth is prominently featured in Ensler's The Vagina Monologues. Colette graduated from Barnard College, of which McDermott was also a trustee. On September 27, 2007, People confirmed that McDermott and Rose had separated. On May 16, 2008, it was reported that McDermott had filed for divorce from Rose. The divorce was finalized on January 2, 2009.

Having met on set in early 2014, on January 14, 2015, it was announced he was engaged to his Stalker co-star Maggie Q. In 2017, they stated that they were not in any rush to have an actual wedding ceremony. In February 2019, the couple split after a four-year engagement.

McDermott has been featured in magazines such as Men's Health. In 1999, he was a finalist in the GQ "Man of the Year" issue.

McDermott is a recovering alcoholic. He has been sober since 1984.

== Filmography ==
=== Film ===
Year	Title	Role	Notes
1987	Hamburger Hill	Staff Sergeant Adam Frantz	
1988	The Blue Iguana	Vince Holloway	
1989	Twister	Chris	
1989	Steel Magnolias	Jackson Latcherie	
1990	Hardware	Moses "Hard Mo" Baxter	
1991	Where Sleeping Dogs Lie	Bruce Simmons	
1992	Jersey Girl	Sal Tomei	
1993	In the Line of Fire	Secret Service Agent Al D'Andrea	
1994	The Cowboy Way	John Stark	
1994	Miracle on 34th Street	Bryan Bedford	
1995	Destiny Turns on the Radio	Julian Goddard	
1995	Home for the Holidays	Leo Fish	
1997	'Til There Was You	Nick Dawkan	
1999	Three to Tango	Charles Newman	
2001	Texas Rangers	Captain Leander McNelly	
2003	Party Monster	Peter Gatien	
2003	Wonderland	David Lind	
2003	Runaway Jury	Jacob Wood	Uncredited cameo
2005	Edison	Sergeant Francis Lazerov	
2005	The Tenants	Harry Lesser	
2005	The Mistress of Spices	Doug	
2006	Unbeatable Harold	Jake Salamander	
2007	The Messengers	Roy	
2007	Have Dreams, Will Travel	Uncle	
2009	Mercy	Jake	
2010	Burning Palms	Dennis Marx	
2012	Nobody Walks	Leroy	
2012	The Campaign	Tim Wattley	
2012	The Perks of Being a Wallflower	Mr. Kelmeckis	
2013	Olympus Has Fallen	Dave Forbes	
2013	Freezer	Robert Saunders	
2014	Behaving Badly	Jimmy Leach	
2014	Autómata	Sean Wallace	
2014	Mercy	Jim Swann	
2015	Survivor	Sam Parker	
2015	The Laws of the Universe Part 0	Yoake Suguru	Limited theatrical release
2016	Blind	Mark Dutchman	
2018	Josie	Hank	
2018	The Clovehitch Killer	Don Burnside	
2021	King Richard	George MacArthur	
TBA	Love Love †		Filming

=== Television ===
Year	Title	Role	Notes
1989	The Neon Empire	Vic	Television film
1991	Into the Badlands	McComas	Television film
1992	Tales from the Crypt	George Gatlin	Episode: "This'll Kill Ya"
1992	The Fear Inside	Pete Caswell	Television film
1997–2004	The Practice	Bobby Donnell	147 episodes
1998	Ally McBeal	Bobby Donnell	2 episodes
1998	Penn & Teller's Sin City Spectacular	Himself	Episode: #1.5
1999	Saturday Night Live	Host	Episode: "Dylan McDermott / Foo Fighters"
2002	Music Behind Bars	Host	8 episodes
2003	Will & Grace	Tom	Episode: "Heart Like a Wheelchair"
2004	The Grid	FBI Agent Max Canary	6 episodes
2006	3 lbs	Dr. Douglas Hanson	Unsold television pilot
2006	A House Divided	Anderson	Television film
2007–2008	Big Shots	Duncan Collinsworth	11 episodes
2009–2010	Dark Blue	Carter Shaw	20 episodes
2011	American Horror Story: Murder House	Dr. Ben Harmon	12 episodes
2011	Vietnam in HD	James Anderson (voice)	Episode: "The Beginning"
2012–2013	American Horror Story: Asylum	Johnny Morgan	5 episodes
2013–2014	Hostages	Duncan Carlisle	15 episodes
2014–2015	Stalker	Detective Jack Larsen	20 episodes
2018	LA to Vegas	Captain Dave Pratman	15 episodes
2018	American Horror Story: Apocalypse	Dr. Ben Harmon	Episode: "Return to Murder House"
2019	The Politician	Theo Sloan	6 episodes
2019	American Horror Story: 1984	Bruce	3 episodes
2019	No Activity	Clint Bergman	7 episodes
2020	Hollywood	Ernie West	7 episodes
2021–2022	Law & Order: Organized Crime	Richard Wheatley	15 episodes
2021	American Horror Stories	Ben Harmon	Episode: "Game Over"
2021	Law & Order: Special Victims Unit	Richard Wheatley	Episode: "The People v. Richard Wheatley"
2022–2025	FBI: Most Wanted	Supervisory Special Agent Remy Scott	63 episodes
2023	FBI	Supervisory Special Agent Remy Scott	Episode: "Imminent Threat: Part 2"

== Theatre ==
Year	Title	Role
—N/a	Golden Boy	—N/a
1978	Believe It, See It, Survival	—N/a
1985	Biloxi Blues	Roy Selridge
1995	Floating Rhoda and the Glue Man	—N/a
2006	The Treatment	Man
2008	Three Changes	Nate

== Awards and nominations ==
Year	Association	Category	Nominated work	Result
1998	Viewers for Quality Television	Best Actor in a Quality Drama Series	The Practice	Nominated
1999	Golden Globe Awards	Best Actor – Television Series Drama	The Practice	Won
1999	Primetime Emmy Awards	Outstanding Lead Actor in a Drama Series	The Practice	Nominated
1999	Satellite Awards	Best Actor – Television Series Drama	The Practice	Nominated
1999	Screen Actors Guild Awards	Outstanding Performance by an Ensemble in a Drama Series	The Practice	Nominated
1999	Television Critics Association Awards	Individual Achievement in Drama	The Practice	Nominated
2000	Golden Globe Awards	Best Actor – Television Series Drama	The Practice	Nominated
2000	Satellite Awards	Best Actor – Television Series Drama	The Practice	Nominated
2000	Screen Actors Guild Awards	Outstanding Performance by an Ensemble in a Drama Series	The Practice	Nominated
2000	Viewers for Quality Television	Best Actor in a Quality Drama Series	The Practice	Nominated
2001	Golden Globe Awards	Best Actor – Television Series Drama	The Practice	Nominated
2001	Screen Actors Guild Awards	Outstanding Performance by an Ensemble in a Drama Series	The Practice	Nominated
2004	Prism Awards	Best Performance in a Theatrical Feature Film	Wonderland	Nominated
2012	San Diego Film Critics Society Awards	Best Performance by an Ensemble	The Perks of Being a Wallflower	Won
2012	Saturn Awards	Best Actor on Television	American Horror Story: Murder House	Nominated
2015	People's Choice Awards	Favorite Actor in a New TV Series	Stalker	Nominated
2019	Gold Derby Awards	Best Drama Guest Actor	American Horror Story: Apocalypse	Nominated
2020	Primetime Emmy Awards	Outstanding Supporting Actor in a Limited Series or Movie	Hollywood	Nominated
2021	Critics' Choice Television Awards	Best Supporting Actor in a Movie/Miniseries	Hollywood	Nominated
