= Cop Car (film) =

2015 independent thriller film by Jon Watts

- Theatrical release poster
- Directed by: Jon Watts
- Written by: Jon Watts; Christopher Ford
- Produced by: Cody Ryder; Alicia Van Couvering; Sam Bisbee; Andrew Kortschak; Jon Watts
- Starring: Kevin Bacon; James Freedson-Jackson; Hays Wellford; Camryn Manheim; Shea Whigham
- Cinematography: Matthew J. Lloyd; Larkin Seiple
- Edited by: Megan Brooks; Andrew Hasse
- Music by: Phil Mossman
- Production companies: Audax Films; Park Pictures; Dark Arts Film
- Distributed by: Focus World
- Release dates: January 24, 2015 (Sundance); August 7, 2015 (United States)
- Running time: 88 minutes
- Country: United States
- Language: English
- Budget: $5 million
- Box office: $143,658

Cop Car is a 2015 American independent road-thriller film co-written and directed by Jon Watts and starring Kevin Bacon, Shea Whigham, Camryn Manheim, James Freedson-Jackson, and Hays Wellford. The film follows two young boys and juvenile delinquents who come across and hijack the abandoned police car of a corrupt sheriff. It premiered at the 2015 Sundance Film Festival and was released in the United States on August 7, 2015 by Focus World. The film received mainly positive reviews from critics but was commercially unsuccessful, earning $143,658 on a $5 million budget.

== Plot ==
Corrupt sheriff Kretzer removes his uniform's shirt and leaves his handgun in the back seat of his police car. He removes a body from his car's trunk, drags and drops it in a covered pit in the woods, and pours a bag of quicklime on it. Meanwhile, two young runaways and juvenile delinquents, Travis and Harrison, come across Kretzer's cop car. Believing it to be abandoned, they hijack the vehicle and go on a joyride. Upon finding his car gone, Kretzer calls his dispatcher Mary Allen to tell her that his radio is down so he should be contacted through phone. Meanwhile, the boys speed down the wrong lane, narrowly missing a woman driving in the oncoming lane.

At a trailer park, Kretzer steals a car, but, after avoiding arrest, he abandons it, replacing it with his own pickup truck when he arrives home. Allen informs him of a report of a stolen sheriff's car driven by two boys under age 10. He orders her to ignore the report and has her tell his deputies to switch their radios to a different channel, before he uses the regular channel to call the boys to no avail.

Travis and Harrison are playing with Kretzer's weapons, but they hear thumping from the car's trunk and open it to see a bloodied man, restrained like the man Kretzer disposed of earlier. He manages to persuade the boys to free him after informing them about Kretzer being the "bad guy." At home, Kretzer dumps bags of cocaine into his toilet and packs a bag of cash. He hears Harrison on his truck's radio and picks up the call, where Harrison claims to have kept the car safe and tells him their location.

The man from the trunk had betrayed the boys and forced Harrison at gunpoint to tell Kretzer their location so he can enact revenge. He and his brother, the dead body from earlier, were part of a drug deal with Kretzer gone wrong. Locking them in the car's backseat, he threatens the boys' families and warns them not to tell Kretzer where he is hiding before taking cover near a windmill. Kretzer arrives and sees the open front door of the cop car, and takes cover behind the car after sensing that something is amiss.

The woman whose car the boys almost hit earlier, Bev, shows up and walks towards the car, screaming at the boys. She sees Kretzer, who claims to be injured, and he asks her to look for his keys in the direction where he suspects the man is hiding. Bev spots the man from the trunk and gives away his location before she is shot and killed by the man, prompting a gunfight with him and Kretzer. Kretzer manages to kill the man but is severely wounded in the process.

The boys escape the car by shooting out the window, but Travis is hit by one of the ricochets from their escape attempt. Harrison takes the cop car and drives down to get help for Travis, but Kretzer recovers and follows them in his truck while taunting them through the radio. With night falling and not knowing how to turn on the vehicle's headlights, Harrison ignores Kretzer and continues to speed down the road. As Kretzer tries to run them off the road, Harrison sees a cow and avoids it, but Kretzer crashes into it. Harrison continues onward before finally seeing the town lights on the horizon. Allen attempts to contact Kretzer over the radio, which Harrison picks up as he speeds towards town.

== Cast ==
- Kevin Bacon as Sheriff Kretzer
- James Freedson-Jackson as Travis
- Hays Wellford as Harrison
- Camryn Manheim as Beverly "Bev"
- Shea Whigham as Man
- Sean Hartley as Motorcycle Cop
- Kyra Sedgwick as Dispatcher
- Loi Nguyen as Waiter
- Sit Lenh as Hostess
- Chuck Kull as Officer #1
- Thomas Coates as Officer #2
- Kathleen Bentley as Trailer Park Lady
- Justin Barr as Guy in Trailer Park
- Adam Barr as Drunk at Intersection
- Lily & Cooter Heber as Dogs
- Bluebell as Herself

== Release ==
The film premiered at the Sundance Film Festival on January 24, 2015. That same month, Focus World won distribution rights to the film in a bidding war which included studios such as IFC Films and Lionsgate Films, releasing it in theaters on August 7, 2015.

== Reception ==
=== Critical response ===
Cop Car received generally positive reviews from critics. On Rotten Tomatoes, the film has an approval rating of 82% based on 90 reviews, with an average rating of 7.10/10. The site's critical consensus reads, "Cop Car boasts a terrific premise and a grimly gripping opening act -- and for some viewers, that will be enough to compensate for the movie's uneven denouement." On Metacritic, the film has a score of 66 out of 100, based on 21 critics, indicating "generally favorable" reviews.

Michael O'Sullivan of The Washington Post gave the film two out of four stars, saying, "Cop Car builds up a nice, suspenseful head of steam, mixing dark comedy and true creepiness in such a way that one mood never overwhelms the other." Bill Goodykoontz of The Arizona Republic gave the film three and a half stars out of five, saying, "Bacon can play just about anything, and he's having a good time here as a guy not quite smart enough to keep himself out of trouble, but wily enough to try to dig himself out of it. It's fun to watch." Bruce Demara of the Toronto Star gave the film three out of four stars, saying, "Anchored by solid performances and a taut script, Cop Car is a tension-filled thrill ride." Brian Moylan of The Guardian gave the film four out of five stars, saying, "The movie culminates in a tense, protracted standoff that keeps the audience on edge for way longer than is comfortable. I mean that as a compliment." Todd McCarthy of The Hollywood Reporter gave the film a negative review, saying, "A potentially fun premise soon turns into no fun at all in Cop Car, a seriously imagination-challenged low-end action thriller." Peter Debruge of Variety gave the film a positive review, saying, "Watts demonstrates masterful control, pushing right up against the limits of what we can take (even non-parents will be rattled watching the boys mishandling loaded weapons), and yet, at every turn, the screenplay falls short of the picture's full potential, missing opportunities that could have made this a classic."

=== Accolades ===
| Year | Award | Category | Nominee(s) | Result | Ref. |
|---|---|---|---|---|---|
| 2015 | Deauville American Film Festival | Grand Special Prize | Jon Watts | Nominated | |
| 2015 | Edinburgh International Film Festival | Audience Award | Jon Watts | Nominated | |
| 2015 | National Board of Review Awards | Top Ten Independent Films | Cop Car | Won | |
| 2016 | Saturn Awards | Best Independent Film | Cop Car | Nominated | |
| 2016 | Saturn Awards | Best Performance by a Younger Actor | James Freedson-Jackson | Nominated | |
