= Jon Watts =

American filmmaker (born 1981)

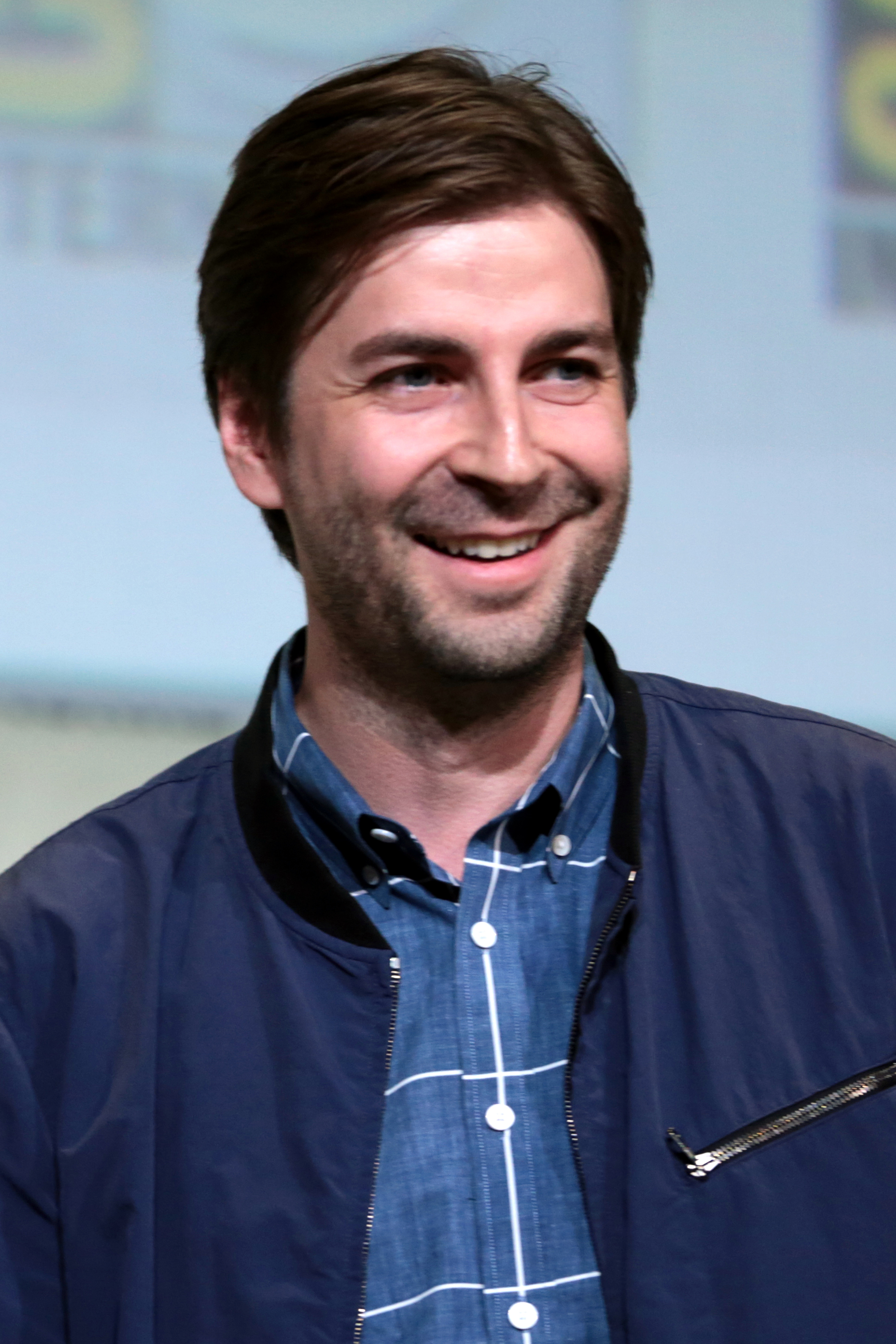
- Watts at the 2016 San Diego Comic-Con
- Born: Jonathan Watts; June 28, 1981 (age 45); Fountain, Colorado, U.S.
- Education: New York University
- Occupations: Film director; screenwriter; producer
- Years active: 2000–present
- Known for: Director of 3 Spider-Man films in the Marvel Cinematic Universe (MCU)
- Spouse: Dianne McGunigle

Jonathan Watts (born June 28, 1981) is an American filmmaker. He is best known for directing the Spider-Man films within the Marvel Cinematic Universe (MCU): Homecoming (2017), Far From Home (2019), and No Way Home (2021). He also directed and co-wrote the films Clown (2014), Cop Car (2015), and Wolfs (2024); as well as directing many episodes of the parody television news series Onion News Network. Watts has also directed music videos for electronic music artists such as Fatboy Slim and Swedish House Mafia.

== Early life ==
Watts was born on June 28, 1981, and raised in Fountain, Colorado, where he attended Fountain-Fort Carson High School. He studied film at New York University.

== Career ==
Watts began his directing career by directing commercials for production company Park Pictures.

Watts' film career started with the short Clay Pride: Being Clay in America. A claymation film, it is a satire of films about gay issues, with the main character, Steve Thompson, coming out as "clay". Over the next decade, Watts would continue to work in short films, as well as directing several music videos for various artists including Fatboy Slim, Death Cab for Cutie, Relient K, Sleigh Bells, Head Automatica, and TV on the Radio. He even directed a few videos that were selected in episodes of Online Nation.

Watts' feature directorial debut was the 2014 horror film, Clown. Watts and his friend Christopher Ford had made a fake trailer for a film about a father turning into a demonic killer clown after trying on an old costume he finds in his basement. After uploading the trailer to YouTube, Watts was approached by Eli Roth with an offer to produce a feature version.

Watts' next film was the 2015 thriller, Cop Car. The film is about two young boys who steal an abandoned police car and are pursued by its murderous owner, a Sheriff played by Kevin Bacon. In an interview, Watts revealed that the idea for the film came from a dream he had when he was a child.

Watts then directed Spider-Man: Homecoming. Watts was so determined to be the director of the film that he admitted that he had "bothered" Marvel by sending them clips of a fake trailer he made for a Spider-Man movie. He admits that he was very surprised and did not know he was going to get the job until the last moment.

Watts directed the film's 2019 sequel Spider-Man: Far From Home. He reportedly became increasingly devoted to the franchise, even starting his own extensive collection of rare spiders.

Watts has also directed Spider-Man: No Way Home, which was released on December 17, 2021, where he also provided the motion-capture for Sandman while Thomas Haden Church reprised the voice of the character from Spider-Man 3. He was confirmed to be directing The Fantastic Four: First Steps, which would be set in the Marvel Cinematic Universe but exited the project in April 2022. Watts also directed the mid-credits scene of Venom: Let There Be Carnage, a tie-in to No Way Home, which was released two months earlier on October 1, 2021. The scene was shot during the filming of No Way Home.

In September 2021, it was revealed that Watts would write and direct the thriller film Wolfs starring George Clooney and Brad Pitt. He would also produce the project along with the two actors. By the end of the month, the project had been acquired by Apple Studios, and was expected to receive a "robust theatrical release". However, six weeks before the film's release, Apple pivoted the film to a limited release.

In January 2022, Watts and his wife were announced to have joined the sixth installment of the Final Destination series as co-producers. Watts also wrote a film treatment as well, adapted by Lori Evans Taylor and Guy Busick.

In May 2022, it was revealed that Watts would create and executive produce an Amblin inspired Star Wars TV series for Disney+ that is set after the events of Return of the Jedi. This series was soon revealed as Star Wars: Skeleton Crew, which premiered in 2024. Watts received the Children's and Family Emmy Award for Outstanding Young Teen Series for his work on the series.

In September 2024, Watts and his wife McGunigle, along with their production company Freshman Year, signed a first-look feature deal with Walt Disney Studios. Under the deal, Watts will direct feature-length projects for Disney live-action and 20th Century Studios with the option to produce.

In September 2026, it was reported that Watts would direct the first installment of a new Star Wars trilogy written by Simon Kinberg.

== Personal life ==
Watts is married to former talent agent and producer Dianne McGunigle.

== Filmography ==
=== Film ===
| Year | Title | Director | Writer | Producer | Notes |
|---|---|---|---|---|---|
| 2014 | Clown | Yes | Yes | No | |
| 2015 | Cop Car | Yes | Yes | Yes | |
| 2017 | Spider-Man: Homecoming | Yes | Yes | No | |
| 2019 | Spider-Man: Far From Home | Yes | No | No | |
| 2021 | Spider-Man: No Way Home | Yes | No | No | Also provided the motion-capture of Sandman |
| 2024 | Wolfs | Yes | Yes | Yes | |
| 2025 | Final Destination Bloodlines | No | Story | Yes | |
| 2026 | Never Change! | No | No | Yes | |
| TBA | Star Wars: Episode X | | | | |

Actor

| Year | Title | Role |
|---|---|---|
| 2008 | I Can See You | Jake |
| 2015 | Creative Control | Commercial Director |

Other

| Year | Title | Role |
|---|---|---|
| 2000 | Sexy Beast | Operator, photogenics unit |
| 2011 | Natural Selection | Associate producer |
| 2012 | Robot & Frank | Thanks credit |
| 2021 | Venom: Let There Be Carnage | Directed mid-credits scene (Uncredited) |

=== Television ===
| Year | Title | Director | Producer | Writer | Notes |
|---|---|---|---|---|---|
| 2011 | Onion News Network | Yes | Co-executive | No | Directed 10 episodes |
| 2011 | The Fuzz | Yes | Yes | Yes | TV pilot |
| 2012 | Eugene! | Yes | Executive | Yes | TV movie |
| 2022 | The Old Man | Yes | Executive | No | Directed episodes "I" and "II" |
| 2024–2025 | Star Wars: Skeleton Crew | Yes | Executive | Yes | Showrunner and creator Directed 2 episodes Written 6 episodes |

=== Music videos ===
| Year | Title | Artist | Notes |
|---|---|---|---|
| 2004 | "Stepping Off" | Jason Forrest | |
| 2004 | "Wonderful Night" | Fatboy Slim | |
| 2004 | "The Joker" | Fatboy Slim | |
| 2005 | "The Irish Keep Gate-crashing" | The Thrills | |
| 2005 | "The Beautiful Side of Somewhere" | The Wallflowers | |
| 2005 | "We Live on Your Street" | The Willowz | |
| 2005 | "Beating Heart Baby" | Head Automatica | |
| 2005 | "When the Lights Go Down" | Armand van Helden | |
| 2005 | "Soul Meets Body" | Death Cab for Cutie | |
| 2005 | "Who I Am Hates Who I've Been" | Relient K | |
| 2005 | "Into Your Eyes" | Armand van Helden | |
| 2006 | "We Are One Tonight" | Switchfoot | |
| 2006 | "That Old Pair of Jeans" | Fatboy Slim | |
| 2006 | "Oh, Mandy" | The Spinto Band | co-directed with Sean Donnelly |
| 2006 | "White Daisy Passing" | Rocky Votolato | |
| 2006 | "Wolf Like Me" | TV on the Radio | |
| 2006 | "Taking Back Control" | Sparta | |
| 2007 | "Pieces of the People We Love" | The Rapture | co-directed with Ben Dickinson |
| 2007 | "Pressure Suit" | Aqualung | |
| 2007 | "The Beauty in Ugly" | Jason Mraz | |
| 2008 | "Dust" | Royworld | |
| 2009 | "Candle (Sick and Tired)" | The White Tie Affair | |
| 2010 | "Young Girl" | Dawn Landes | |
| 2010 | "Brand New Day" | Joshua Radin | |
| 2010 | "Destroy" | The Japanese Popstars ft. Jon Spencer | |
| 2011 | "Rill Rill" | Sleigh Bells | |
| 2011 | "Save the World" | Swedish House Mafia | |

=== Commercials ===
| Year | Title | Brand | Notes |
|---|---|---|---|
| 2004 | "Magic Trick" | Frosted Flakes | |
| 2004 | "Breaking News" | The New York Times | |
| 2006 | "Lazybone" | 24 Hour Fitness | |
| 2006 | "Reflection" | 24 Hour Fitness | |
| 2006 | "Training" | 24 Hour Fitness | |
| 2007 | "Tonguezilla" | Sprite | |
| 2007 | "Diner" | Sprite | |
| 2007 | "Elevator" | Sprite | |
| 2007 | "Garfield Clock" | eBay | |
| 2008 | "Green Flag" | ESPN / NASCAR | |
| 2008 | "The Duel" | ESPN / NASCAR | |
| 2008 | "Neighborhood" | Sci-Fi / Eureka | |
| 2008 | "Darkmane" | ESPN / X Games | |
| 2009 | "7 Second Demos" | Windows 7 | |
| 2010 | "Alien Field Trip" | Lunchables | |
| 2010 | "In the Loop" | Nokia | |
| 2011 | "Wrong Decisions" | Coldwell Banker | |
| 2011 | "Cooking Show" | Philadelphia | |
| 2012 | "5 Cents" | MetLife | |
| 2012 | "Hold Music" | MetLife | |
| 2013 | "Never Change" | Sprint | |
| 2014 | "Teachers" | Jacob's | |
| 2014 | "Park" | Jacob's | |
| 2014 | "Rally" | Jacob's | |
| 2017 | "Sea of Chaos" | Clash Royale | |

== See also ==
- List of New York University alumni
