= 22nd Producers Guild of America Awards =

22nd Annual Producers Guild Awards
- Date: January 22, 2011
- Location: The Beverly Hilton, Beverly Hills, California
- Country: United States
- Presented by: Producers Guild of America

Highlights
- Best Producer(s) Motion Picture: The King's Speech – Iain Canning, Emile Sherman, and Gareth Unwin
- Best Producer(s) Animated Feature: Toy Story 3 – Darla K. Anderson
- Best Producer(s) Documentary Motion Picture: Waiting for "Superman" – Lesley Chilcott

The 22nd Producers Guild of America Awards (also known as 2011 Producers Guild Awards), honoring the best film and television producers of 2010, were held at The Beverly Hilton Hotel in Beverly Hills, California on January 22, 2011. The nominations were announced on January 4, 2011.

== Winners and nominees ==
=== Film ===
Darryl F. Zanuck Award for Outstanding Producer of Theatrical Motion Pictures
- The King's Speech – Iain Canning, Emile Sherman, and Gareth Unwin
  - 127 Hours – Danny Boyle and Christian Colson
  - Black Swan – Scott Franklin, Mike Medavoy, and Brian Oliver
  - The Fighter – David Hoberman, Todd Lieberman, and Mark Wahlberg
  - Inception – Christopher Nolan and Emma Thomas
  - The Kids Are All Right – Gary Gilbert, Jeffrey Levy-Hinte, and Celine Rattray
  - The Social Network – Dana Brunetti, Ceán Chaffin, Michael De Luca, and Scott Rudin
  - The Town – Basil Iwanyk and Graham King
  - Toy Story 3 – Darla K. Anderson
  - True Grit – Joel Coen, Ethan Coen, and Scott Rudin
Outstanding Producer of Animated Theatrical Motion Pictures
- Toy Story 3 – Darla K. Anderson
  - Despicable Me – Chris Meledandri, John Cohen, and Janet Healy
  - How to Train Your Dragon – Bonnie Arnold
Outstanding Producer of Documentary Theatrical Motion Pictures
- Waiting for "Superman" – Lesley Chilcott
  - Client 9: The Rise and Fall of Eliot Spitzer – Maiken Baird, Alex Gibney, Jedd Wider, and Todd Wider
  - Earth Made of Glass – Reid Carolin and Deborah Scranton
  - Inside Job – Charles Ferguson and Audrey Marrs
  - Smash His Camera – Linda Saffire and Adam Schlesinger
  - The Tillman Story – John Battsek

=== Television ===
Norman Felton Award for Outstanding Producer of Episodic Television, Drama
- Mad Men
  - Breaking Bad
  - Dexter
  - Lost
  - True Blood
Danny Thomas Award for Outstanding Producer of Episodic Television, Comedy
- Modern Family
  - 30 Rock
  - Curb Your Enthusiasm
  - Glee
  - The Office
David L. Wolper Award for Outstanding Producer of Long-Form Television
- The Pacific
  - Murder on the Orient Express
  - The Pillars of the Earth
  - Temple Grandin
  - You Don't Know Jack
Outstanding Producer of Non-Fiction Television
- Deadliest Catch
  - Anthony Bourdain: No Reservations
  - Intervention
  - Kathy Griffin: My Life on the D-List
  - Undercover Boss
Outstanding Producer of Live Entertainment & Competition Television
- The Colbert Report
  - The Amazing Race
  - Project Runway
  - Real Time with Bill Maher
  - Top Chef

=== David O. Selznick Achievement Award in Theatrical Motion Pictures ===
- Scott Rudin

=== Milestone Award ===
- James Cameron

=== Norman Lear Achievement Award in Television ===
- Tom Hanks and Gary Goetzman

=== Stanley Kramer Award ===
- Sean Penn

=== Vanguard Award ===
- RealD

=== Visionary Award ===
- Laura Ziskin
