= List of awards and nominations received by Channing Tatum =

Channing Tatum awards and nominations
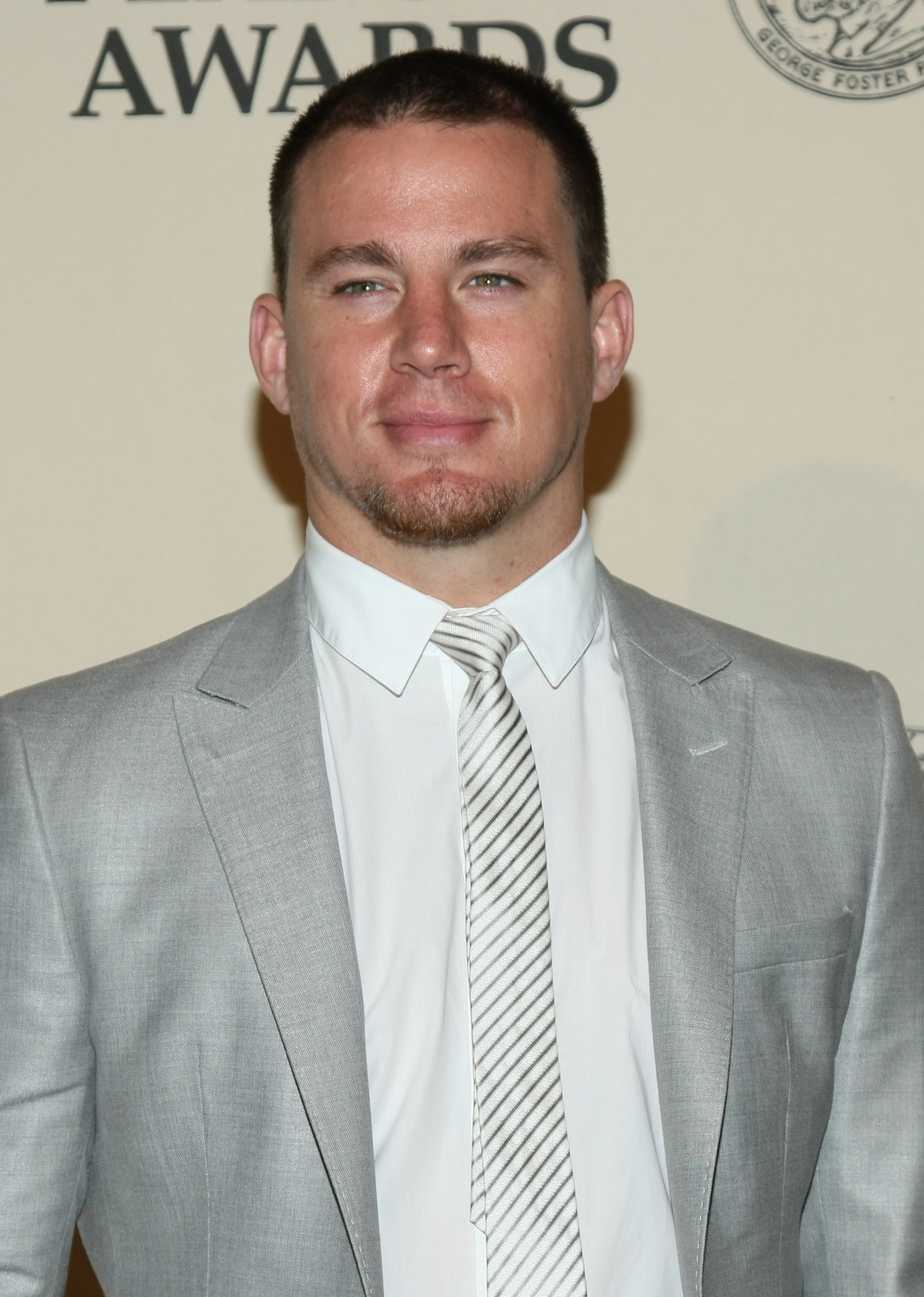
- Tatum at the 2012 Peabody Awards
Awards and nominations
Award	Wins	Nominations
Critics' Choice Awards	0	3
Film Independent Spirit Awards	1	2

Totals (Note: Certain award groups do not simply award one winner. They acknowledge several different recipients, have runners-up, and have third place. Since this is a specific recognition and is different from losing an award, runner-up mentions are considered wins in this award tally. For simplification and to avoid errors, each award in this list has been presumed to have had a prior nomination.)
- Wins: 20
- Nominations: 76

Channing Tatum is an American actor, producer and dancer who has received numerous accolades throughout his career.

Tatum had his breakthrough year in 2006, thanks to the releases of the films Step Up, She's the Man and A Guide to Recognizing Your Saints. For his performance in the lattermost feature, he received nominations for the Gotham Award for Breakthrough Actor and the Independent Spirit Award for Best Supporting Male, while he was honored along with the cast at the Sundance Film Festival. For Step Up and She's the Man, he earned wins at the 2006 and 2007 Teen Choice Awards.

Tatum starred as Greg Jenko in the film 21 Jump Street (2012) and its sequel 22 Jump Street (2014), for which he received two nominations for the Critics' Choice Movie Award for Best Actor in a Comedy and won an MTV Movie & TV Award for Best Comedic Performance. He is also known for his performance as the stripper Michael "Magic Mike" Lane in the films Magic Mike (2012) and Magic Mike XXL (2015), receiving further nominations at the MTV Movie & TV Awards and the Teen Choice Awards for the role.

He received critical acclaim for his acting in the films Foxcatcher (2014) and The Hateful Eight (2015), winning an ensemble award at the Film Independent Spirit Awards for the former and receiving a nomination for the Critics' Choice Movie Award for Best Acting Ensemble for the latter. He produced and starred in the thriller film Josephine (2026), for which her received two nominations at the Gotham Awards, including Best Feature and Outstanding Supporting Performance.

== Awards and nominations ==
Awards and nominations received by Channing Tatum
Association	Year	Nominated work	Category	Result	Ref.
Critics' Choice Awards	2013	21 Jump Street	Best Actor in a Comedy	Nominated	
Critics' Choice Awards	2015	22 Jump Street	Best Actor in a Comedy	Nominated	
Critics' Choice Awards	2016	The Hateful Eight	Best Acting Ensemble	Nominated	
Film Independent Spirit Awards	2007	A Guide to Recognizing Your Saints	Best Supporting Male	Nominated	
Film Independent Spirit Awards	2015	Foxcatcher	Special Distinction Award (Note: shared with the cast, director, producers and screenwriters)	Won	
Gijón International Film Festival	2006	A Guide to Recognizing Your Saints	Best Actor (Note: tied with Shia LaBeouf, Martin Compston, Adam Scarimbolo and Peter Anthony Tambakis)	Won	
Golden Raspberry Awards	2016	Jupiter Ascending	Worst Actor	Nominated	
Golden Raspberry Awards	2024	Magic Mike's Last Dance	Worst Screen Combo (Note: shared with Salma Hayek)	Nominated	
Gotham Awards	2006	A Guide to Recognizing Your Saints	Breakthrough Actor	Nominated	
Gotham Awards	2014	Foxcatcher	Special Jury Award for Ensemble Performance	Won	
Gotham Awards	2026	Josephine	Best Feature (Note: shared with the producers)	Pending	
Gotham Awards	2026	Josephine	Outstanding Supporting Performance	Pending	
Hollywood Film Awards	2014	Foxcatcher	Hollywood Ensemble Award	Won	
Hollywood Film Awards	2015	The Hateful Eight	Hollywood Ensemble Award	Won	
Jupiter Awards	2014	White House Down	Best International Actor	Won	
Kids' Choice Awards	2015	Jupiter Ascending	Favorite Male Action Star	Nominated	
Kids' Choice Awards	2019	Smallfoot	Favorite Male Voice from an Animated Movie	Nominated	
MTV Movie & TV Awards	2010	Dear John	Best Male Performance	Nominated	
MTV Movie & TV Awards	2010	G.I. Joe: The Rise of Cobra	Biggest Badass Star	Nominated	
MTV Movie & TV Awards	2012	The Vow	Best Male Performance	Nominated	
MTV Movie & TV Awards	2012	The Vow	Best Kiss (Note: shared with Rachel McAdams)	Nominated	
MTV Movie & TV Awards	2012	21 Jump Street	Best Fight (Note: shared with Jonah Hill)	Nominated	
MTV Movie & TV Awards	2012	21 Jump Street	Best Cast	Nominated	
MTV Movie & TV Awards	2013	Magic Mike	Best Male Performance	Nominated	
MTV Movie & TV Awards	2013	Magic Mike	Best Shirtless Performance	Nominated	
MTV Movie & TV Awards	2013	Magic Mike	Best Musical Moment (Note: shared with Matt Bomer, Joe Manganiello, Kevin Nash and Adam Rodríguez)	Nominated	
MTV Movie & TV Awards	2014	White House Down	Best Hero	Nominated	
MTV Movie & TV Awards	2014	This Is the End	Best WTF Moment (Note: shared with Danny McBride)	Nominated	
MTV Movie & TV Awards	2014	—N/a	MTV Trailblazer Award	Won	
MTV Movie & TV Awards	2015	Foxcatcher	Best Male Performance	Nominated	
MTV Movie & TV Awards	2015	Foxcatcher	Best Shirtless Performance	Nominated	
MTV Movie & TV Awards	2015	22 Jump Street	Best Comedic Performance	Won	
MTV Movie & TV Awards	2015	22 Jump Street	Best On-Screen Duo	Nominated	
MTV Movie & TV Awards	2022	The Lost City	Best Team (Note: shared with Sandra Bullock and Brad Pitt)	Nominated	
People's Choice Awards	2013	—N/a	Favorite Movie Actor	Nominated	
People's Choice Awards	2013	—N/a	Favorite Comedic Movie Actor	Nominated	
People's Choice Awards	2013	—N/a	Favorite Dramatic Movie Actor	Nominated	
People's Choice Awards	2013	The Vow	Favorite On-Screen Chemistry	Nominated	
People's Choice Awards	2014	—N/a	Favorite Movie Actor	Nominated	
People's Choice Awards	2014	—N/a	Favorite Action Movie Star	Nominated	
People's Choice Awards	2014	—N/a	Favorite Dramatic Movie Actor	Nominated	
People's Choice Awards	2015	—N/a	Favorite Movie Actor	Nominated	
People's Choice Awards	2015	—N/a	Favorite Comedic Movie Actor	Nominated	
People's Choice Awards	2015	22 Jump Street	Favorite Movie Duo	Nominated	
People's Choice Awards	2016	—N/a	Favorite Movie Actor	Won	
People's Choice Awards	2016	—N/a	Favorite Dramatic Movie Actor	Nominated	
People's Choice Awards	2017	Lip Sync Battle	Favorite Comedic Collaboration (Note: shared with Jenna Dewan)	Nominated	
People's Choice Awards	2022	The Lost City	Favorite Comedy Movie Star	Nominated	
San Diego Film Critics Society Awards	2024	Deadpool & Wolverine	Best Comedic Performance	Nominated	
Sundance Film Festival	2006	A Guide to Recognizing Your Saints	Best Ensemble Performance	Won	
Teen Choice Awards	2006	She's the Man	Choice Movie: Male Breakout Star	Won	
Teen Choice Awards	2007	Step Up	Choice Movie Actor: Drama	Nominated	
Teen Choice Awards	2007	Step Up	Choice Movie: Dance	Won	
Teen Choice Awards	2008	Stop-Loss	Choice Movie Actor: Drama	Won	
Teen Choice Awards	2008	—N/a	Choice MySpacer	Nominated	
Teen Choice Awards	2009	Fighting	Choice Movie Actor: Drama	Nominated	
Teen Choice Awards	2010	Dear John	Choice Movie Actor: Drama	Nominated	
Teen Choice Awards	2010	Dear John	Choice Movie: Chemistry (Note: shared with Amanda Seyfried)	Nominated	
Teen Choice Awards	2010	G.I. Joe: The Rise of Cobra	Choice Movie Actor: Action	Won	
Teen Choice Awards	2012	21 Jump Street	Choice Movie Actor: Comedy	Won	
Teen Choice Awards	2012	21 Jump Street	Choice Movie: Chemistry	Nominated	
Teen Choice Awards	2012	21 Jump Street	Choice Movie: Hissy Fit	Nominated	
Teen Choice Awards	2012	The Vow	Choice Movie Actor: Drama	Nominated	
Teen Choice Awards	2012	The Vow	Choice Movie Actor: Romance	Nominated	
Teen Choice Awards	2012	The Vow	Choice Movie: Liplock	Nominated	
Teen Choice Awards	2013	G.I. Joe: Retaliation	Choice Movie: Scene Stealer	Nominated	
Teen Choice Awards	2013	White House Down	Choice Summer Movie Star: Male	Won	
Teen Choice Awards	2013	White House Down	Choice Movie: Chemistry (Note: shared with Jamie Foxx)	Nominated	
Teen Choice Awards	2013	White House Down	Choice Movie: Hissy Fit	Nominated	
Teen Choice Awards	2013	—N/a	Choice Male Hottie	Nominated	
Teen Choice Awards	2014	22 Jump Street	Choice Summer Movie Star	Won	
Teen Choice Awards	2014	22 Jump Street	Choice Movie: Chemistry	Nominated	
Teen Choice Awards	2015	Jupiter Ascending	Choice Movie Actor: Sci-Fi/Fantasy	Nominated	
Teen Choice Awards	2015	Magic Mike XXL	Choice Summer Movie Star: Male	Won	
Toronto International Film Festival	2025	Roofman	TIFF Tribute Performer Award	Won	
Young Hollywood Awards	2014	22 Jump Street	Best Bromance	Won	
