= Deborah Scranton =

American film director (born 1962)

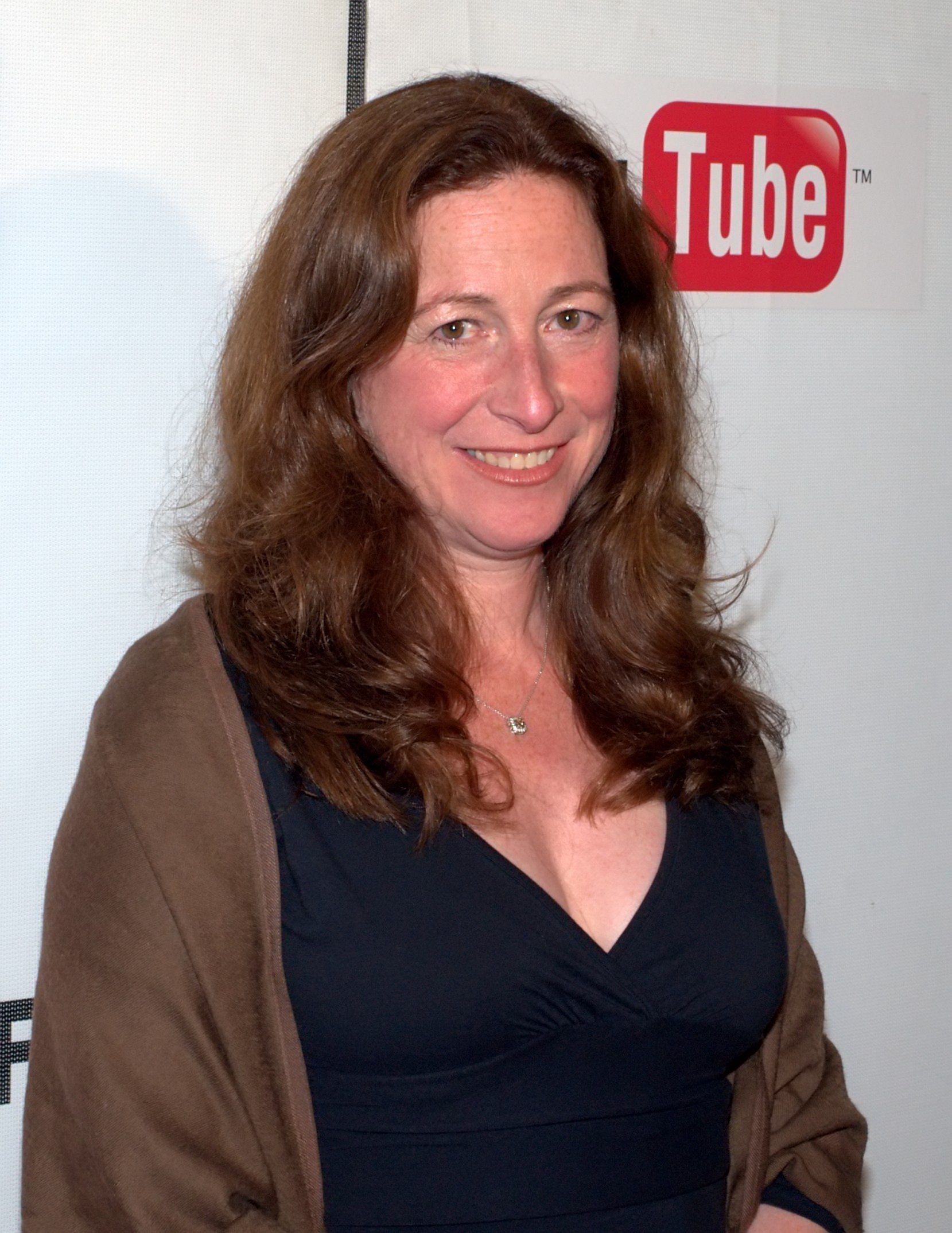
- Born: April 7, 1962 (age 63)
- Education: Brown University; Dartmouth College

Deborah Scranton (born 1962) is an American film director. She directed The War Tapes, a documentary detailing the personal stories of soldiers in the Iraq War. It was the first of its kind in that she sent the soldiers video cameras so they can shoot raw footage of their actual, on hand experiences in combat. The film won several honors, including Best International Documentary at the Tribeca Film Festival and Best International Documentary at BritDoc in 2006 and was shortlisted for an Oscar in 2007.

Scranton also produced and directed Bad Voodoo's War, for Frontline/PBS and ITVS. The show first aired April 1, 2008. It reprised her virtual embed technique, focusing on a squad of U.S.soldiers deploying as part of the 'Surge'.

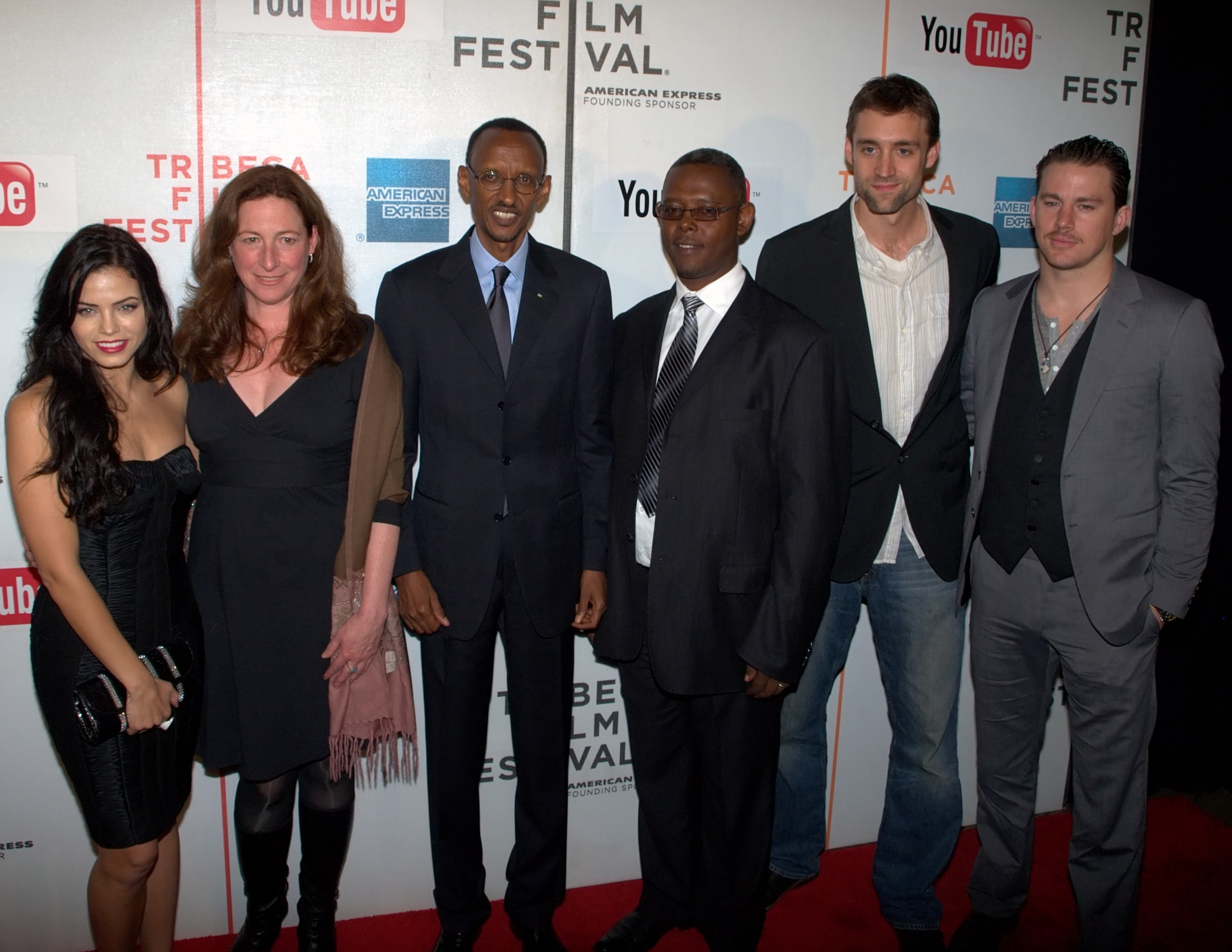
Jenna Dewan, Scranton, Rwandan President Paul Kagame, documentary subject Jean Pierre Sagahutu, producer Reid Carolin and executive producer Channing Tatum attend the premiere of Earth Made of Glass.

Her latest film, Earth Made Of Glass, had its world premiere at the 2010 Tribeca Film Festival in World Documentary Competition. A political thriller set in Rwanda and France, Earth Made of Glass features the President of Rwanda Paul Kagame as one of the film's main characters. Earth Made of Glass aired on HBO in April 2011 and was nominated as Best Documentary by the Producers Guild of America. The film won a Peabody Award in 2012.

In 2007, she was a visiting fellow at the Watson Institute for International and Public Affairs at Brown University with the Global Media Project in the Global Security Program and taught a senior seminar on documentary filmmaking and social change.

Scranton speaks internationally on her "virtual embed" filmmaking technique. She has spoken at conferences and institutions including TED, Nordic Media Festival, The Frontline Club, Harvard, Yale, Center For Irregular Warfare – Quantico and the Tribeca Cinema Film Series. Scranton started her career in television covering sports events including the Tour de France, the Winter Olympics, and US Open Tennis and was also a special assignment reporter. Her work has been profiled in publications including the New York Times, the Los Angeles Times, and the International Herald Tribune.

A former US ski team member, she resides on a farm in the mountains of New Hampshire. She holds a Bachelor of Arts in semiotics from Brown University and a Master of Arts in Liberal Studies from Dartmouth College.
