= Nick Wechsler (film producer) =

American film producer

- Occupation: Producer
- Spouse: Stephanie Romanov (m. 2001)
- Children: 1
- Website: https://www.industryentertainment.ie/

Nick Wechsler is an American film producer.

== Biography ==
Before focusing exclusively on film production, Nick Wechsler started his career as an entertainment attorney, then transitioned into music management. His clients included Steve Earle, John Lydon aka Johnny Rotten, Michael Penn, Chris Whitley, and The Band guitarist Robbie Robertson.

Wechsler's film producing career involves a mix of independent and studio movies, such as 1989 Palme d'Or winner Sex, Lies, and Videotape, 1991 Golden Globe winner The Player, 2006 Oscar-nominated North Country, and 2007 Cannes Main Competition Selection We Own the Night. Wechsler was the founder and co-chairman of the management and production company Industry Entertainment.

In 2005, Wechsler established Nick Wechsler Productions, an independent film production company.

He produced Steven Soderbergh's Magic Mike (2012), starring Channing Tatum and Matthew McConaughey, The Host, starring Saoirse Ronan, and two films penned by Pulitzer Prize winner Cormac McCarthy; 2009's The Road directed by John Hillcoat, and The Counselor (2013), directed by Academy Award winner Ridley Scott, starring Brad Pitt, Michael Fassbender and Cameron Diaz. He also produced Jonathan Glazer's highly acclaimed third feature Under the Skin, starring Scarlett Johansson, which premiered at the Toronto International Film Festival in 2013. A non-fiction book entitled Alien in the Mirror: Scarlett Johansson, Jonathan Glazer and Under the Skin by author Maureen Foster is a scene-by-scene and behind-the-scenes analysis of Under the Skin, and includes quotes from Wechsler on the financing and development of the film. Following the success of Magic Mike, which grossed $170 million worldwide, Wechsler re-teamed with Channing Tatum, Reid Carolin, Steven Soderbergh and Gregory Jacobs to produce the sequel to Magic Mike in fall 2014.

== Personal life ==
In December 2001, he married model/actress Stephanie Romanov in Cambodia; they have one child together, Lily Andreja Romanov-Wechsler.

== Filmography ==
He was a producer in all films unless otherwise noted.

=== Film ===
Year	Film	Credit
1987	The Beat	
1989	Sex, Lies, and Videotape	Executive producer
1989	Drugstore Cowboy	
1991	The Rapture	
1992	Fathers & Sons	Executive producer
1992	The Player	
1994	Little Odessa	Executive producer
1994	The New Age	
1995	The Journey of August King	
1996	Trees Lounge	Executive producer
1997	Love Jones	
1997	Eve's Bayou	Executive producer
1998	Polish Wedding	Executive producer
2000	Signs and Wonders	Executive producer
2000	The Yards	
2000	Requiem for a Dream	Executive producer
2000	Quills	
2001	Antitrust	
2001	The Invisible Circus	
2001	15 Minutes	
2002	25th Hour	Executive producer
2004	The Final Cut	
2005	Fierce People	
2005	North Country	
2006	The Fountain	Executive producer
2007	We Own the Night	
2007	Reservation Road	
2009	The Time Traveler's Wife	
2009	The Road	
2010	Last Night	
2012	Magic Mike	
2013	The Host	
2013	Under the Skin	
2013	The Counselor	
2014	Serena	
2015	Magic Mike XXL	
2017	American Assassin	
2022	All the Old Knives	
2023	Magic Mike's Last Dance	
2025	Anniversary	

As writer

Year	Film
1987	Made in U.S.A.

Thanks

Year	Film	Role
1991	My Own Private Idaho	Special thanks
1995	Man of the Year	Very special thanks
1998	All the Little Animals	Special thanks
2001	Storytelling	Special thanks
2006	The Garden	Special thanks

=== Television ===
Year	Title	Credit	Notes
1997	The Player	Executive producer	Television pilot
2000	Noriega: God's Favorite	Executive producer	Television film
2002	Astronauts		Television film
2016	Dr. Del	Executive producer	Television film
2021	Finding Magic Mike	Executive producer	
