= Isle of Man (film) =

- Directed by: Reid Carolin
- Written by: Reid Carolin; Jason Keller; Bryan Johnson
- Produced by: Reid Carolin; Guymon Casady; Jason Keller; Brad Pitt; Channing Tatum
- Starring: Channing Tatum; Eve Hewson; Éanna Hardwicke; Ciarán Hinds; May Calamawy; Ruaridh Mollica
- Production companies: Free Association; Plan B Entertainment; Entertainment 360
- Distributed by: Amazon MGM Studios
- Country: United States
- Language: English

Isle of Man is an upcoming American sports drama film written and directed by Reid Carolin. It stars Channing Tatum, Eve Hewson, Ciarán Hinds, May Calamawy, and Ruaridh Mollica.

== Cast ==
- Channing Tatum
- Eve Hewson
- Éanna Hardwicke
- Ciarán Hinds
- May Calamawy
- Ruaridh Mollica

== Production ==
In May 2024, it was announced that a film based on the annual motorcycle racing event, Isle of Man TT, was being developed and produced by Brad Pitt and Channing Tatum, with Guymon Casady and Jason Keller also attached as producers. In June 2025, it was reported that the film had entered development at Amazon MGM Studios, who will also distribute the film. It was also announced that Reid Carolin would direct, co-write, and produce the film, with Tatum set to star.

In April 2026, Eve Hewson and Éanna Hardwicke joined the cast. The following month, Ciarán Hinds, May Calamawy and Ruaridh Mollica were reported to have been cast.

Principal photography took place at the 2026 Isle of Man TT races beginning on May 22, 2026. Filming occurred on May 25, 2026 on Glencrutchery Road in Douglas, Isle of Man; as well as on Mountain Road.
