= Side Effects (2013 film) =

2013 film by Steven Soderbergh

- Theatrical release poster
- Directed by: Steven Soderbergh
- Written by: Scott Z. Burns
- Produced by: Lorenzo di Bonaventura; Gregory Jacobs; Scott Z. Burns
- Starring: Jude Law; Rooney Mara; Catherine Zeta-Jones; Channing Tatum
- Cinematography: Peter Andrews
- Edited by: Mary Ann Bernard
- Music by: Thomas Newman
- Production companies: Endgame Entertainment; FilmNation Entertainment; Di Bonaventura Pictures
- Distributed by: Open Road Films
- Release date: February 8, 2013 (United States)
- Running time: 106 minutes
- Country: United States
- Language: English
- Budget: $30 million
- Box office: $66.7 million

Side Effects is a 2013 American crime thriller film directed by Steven Soderbergh and written by Scott Z. Burns. It stars Rooney Mara as a woman who is prescribed experimental drugs by psychiatrists (Jude Law and Catherine Zeta-Jones) after her husband (Channing Tatum) is released from prison.

Side Effects was released in the United States on February 8, 2013, by Open Road Films. It received positive reviews and grossed $66 million worldwide.

== Plot ==
After her husband Martin completes a four-year prison sentence for insider trading, Bedford, New York socialite Emily Taylor drives into the wall of a parking garage in an apparent suicide attempt. Jonathan Banks, her assigned psychiatrist, prescribes a series of antidepressants, but none work. Jonathan contacts Emily's previous psychiatrist, Victoria Siebert, who runs her own practice in Connecticut and suggests a new experimental drug, Ablixa. The drug seems to help Emily but gives her sleepwalking episodes as a side effect.

One night, Emily stabs Martin to death while sleepwalking. Jonathan fights for Emily's acquittal in court. She pleads not guilty by reason of insanity and she is adjudicated not guilty on the condition that she remain in a psychiatric hospital until she is determined by Jonathan not to be a danger to herself or others. The negative publicity destroys Jonathan's reputation; his colleagues then assume negligence on his part and expel him from their practice, leaving him broke.

Jonathan discovers evidence that Emily is lying; she was never depressed and faked her suicide attempts. He also discovers someone has profited from Ablixa's fall in stock value. He interviews Emily after administering what he claims is a truth serum that will make her drowsy. Though the serum is actually saline water, she feigns drowsiness, confirming Jonathan's suspicions that she is deceiving him.

When Jonathan confronts Victoria with his findings, in retaliation she mails photographs to his wife, Deirdre, implying that he had an affair with Emily. Deirdre leaves him, taking her son with her.

Jonathan calls Victoria's bluff by telling her that Emily told him about their plot. He threatens Emily with electric shock treatment and tells her that Victoria is paying him to keep her incarcerated so that she can keep a bigger cut.

Emily explains that she hated Martin for ruining their formerly opulent lifestyle and began plotting to kill him. She began seeing Victoria for counseling, and the women became lovers. Emily taught Victoria about the finance industry, while Victoria taught Emily how to fake psychiatric disorders. They plotted to kill Martin and to use the negative Ablixa publicity to manipulate stock prices. Jonathan accepts Emily's offer to give him a cut of her money if he releases her from the hospital.

Emily meets Victoria while wearing a wire. After Victoria is captured recounting details of their plot, she is arrested for conspiracy to commit murder and securities fraud. Emily, due to double jeopardy, cannot be charged as criminally responsible for her part in Martin's murder.

As retaliation for Emily's part in the plot, Jonathan, who still oversees her case, prescribes her Thorazine and Depakote and describes their unpleasant side effects. According to the terms of her earlier release, Emily is sent back to the mental ward for refusing treatment. Jonathan regains his family and professional reputation. Emily is last seen once again confined to the secure ward of a psychiatric hospital in Manhattan.

== Cast ==
- Jude Law as Dr. Jonathan Banks
- Rooney Mara as Emily Taylor
- Catherine Zeta-Jones as Dr. Victoria Siebert
- Channing Tatum as Martin Taylor
- Vinessa Shaw as Deirdre Banks
- Ann Dowd as Martin's mother
- David Costabile as Carl
- Peter Friedman as Gene

== Production ==
Side Effects, previously titled The Bitter Pill, was directed by Steven Soderbergh, produced by Lorenzo di Bonaventura, Gregory Jacobs, and Scott Z. Burns, who also worked on the screenplay. In January 2012, the film was reported to be produced by Annapurna Pictures. A few weeks later, Annapurna Pictures pulled out from the project, and Endgame Entertainment provided financing for the project instead. Originally, Blake Lively was cast for the lead role. However, it was later reported Rooney Mara would replace her. In March 2012, it was reported that Vinessa Shaw was in talks to join the film as the wife of Law's character.

=== Filming ===
Principal photography started on April 5, 2012, in New York City. The first pictures from the set were publicized on April 10, 2012.

=== Music ===
The Side Effects score was composed and produced by Thomas Newman. The soundtrack was released on March 3, 2013, by Varèse Sarabande.

== Release ==
In January 2012, it was reported that The Bitter Pill would be released by Open Road Films. The title was later changed to Side Effects. In November 2012, the first trailer was released. The film was screened in competition at the 63rd Berlin International Film Festival.

Side Effects opened nationwide on February 8, 2013. It finished number three at the box office with $9.3 million, behind fellow newcomer Identity Thief ($34.6 million) and Warm Bodies ($11.4 million). The film grossed $32.2 million in America and $31.2 million in other territories, for a total gross of $63.4 million.

== Reception ==
=== Critical response ===
On Rotten Tomatoes, the film has a rating of 82%, based on 226 reviews, with an average rating of 7.4/10. The site's consensus reads: "A smart, clever thriller with plenty of disquieting twists, Side Effects is yet another assured effort from director Steven Soderbergh." On Metacritic, the film holds a score of 75 out of 100, based on reviews from 40 critics, indicating "generally favorable reviews". Audiences polled by CinemaScore gave the film an average grade of "B" on an A+ to F scale.

Peter Sobczynski gave the film two-and-a-half out of four stars. Kirk Honeycutt of Honey Cutts Hollywood called the film a "post-modern Hitchcock-thriller" and praised the story matter, which he dubbed "incredible". Richard Corliss of Time gave the film a positive review, complimenting the director and screenwriter and noting its similarity to Spellbound, The Wrong Man, Vertigo, Marnie — as well as Brian De Palma's films Obsession, Dressed to Kill, Raising Cain, and Passion, stating "More efficient than inspired, Soderbergh rarely succeeds on style alone, but when given a sharp script, like the one for Side Effects, he can make an excellent film. If this is his swan song, it's got a haunting melody".

In the UK, Peter Bradshaw of The Guardian awarded the film a maximum five stars, calling it "a gripping psychological thriller about big pharma and mental health that cruelly leaves you craving one last fix". He praised the lead performance from Rooney Mara as "compelling" who "lays down the law with her presence. She demonstrates a potent Hitchcockian combination: an ability to be scared and scary at the same time, and Soderbergh's film manages to introduce its effects in some insidious, almost intravenous way". The A.V. Club's Scott Tobias called Mara "superb as the glue that binds this fractured psychological puzzle," and commended Soderbergh's sophisticated direction: "Side Effects screws around in its own thriller architecture, toying with feints of structure and clever bits of misdirection, and otherwise playing the audience like a fiddle. At this point in his career, Soderbergh pulls it off with the unpracticed ease of a maestro." Robbie Collin of The Daily Telegraph awarded Side Effects a maximum five stars and also acknowledged its debt to earlier psychological thrillers. He wrote: "There's a lot of Alfred Hitchcock in what follows, but even more Henri-Georges Clouzot, with whose classic spine-tingler Les Diaboliques (1954) Soderbergh's film shares a poisonous tang". Peter Travers of Rolling Stone praised the film's performances, the script and direction, writing "Soderbergh delivers ticking-bomb suspense laced with psychological acuity about a world where mood-altering meds are as disturbingly prevalent as social media".

=== Accolades ===
Award	Category	Subject	Result
Berlin International Film Festival	Golden Berlin Bear	Steven Soderbergh	Nominated
International Online Cinema Awards	Best Original Screenplay	Scott Z. Burns	Nominated
International Online Cinema Awards	Best Actress	Rooney Mara	Nominated
World Soundtrack Academy Award	Film Composer of the Year	Thomas Newman	Nominated
