= Gregory Jacobs =

American film director

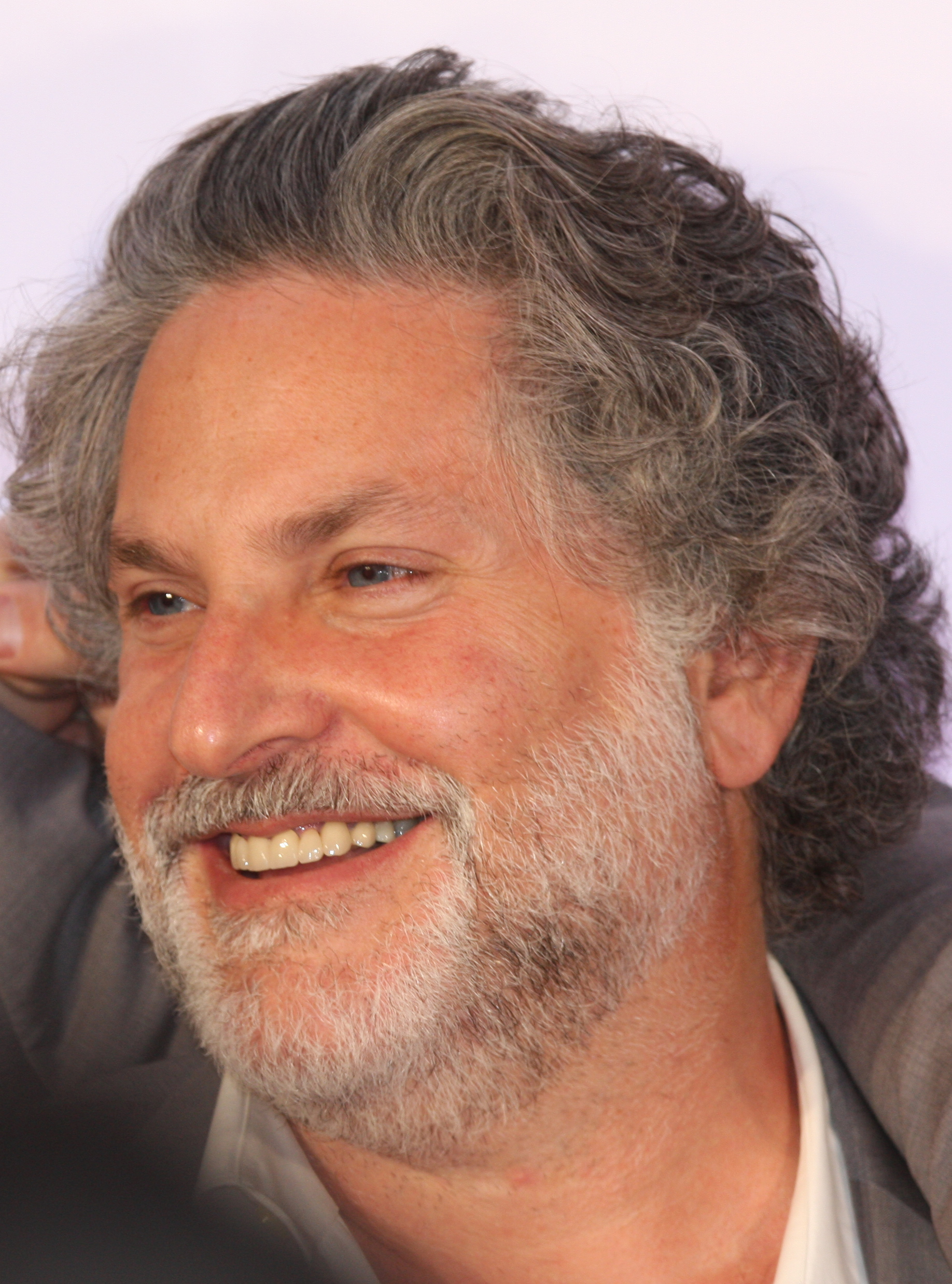
- Jacobs in 2015
- Born: August 14, 1968 (age 58); Harrington Park, New Jersey, US
- Other name: Greg Jacobs
- Education: Tisch School of the Arts
- Occupations: Film director, assistant director, producer, screenwriter
- Years active: 1987–present
- Spouse: Heather Jacobs
- Children: 2

Gregory Jacobs (born August 14, 1968) is an American film director, assistant director, producer, and screenwriter. He has frequently collaborated with several film directors, most notably Steven Soderbergh, as well as directing himself, having overseen projects such as Criminal (2004), Wind Chill (2007) and Magic Mike XXL (2015).

== Early life ==
Jacobs was born and raised in Harrington Park, New Jersey, where he attended Harrington Park Elementary School and was first introduced to film making by 7th grade teacher, Eugene Kennedy. He was further educated at Northern Valley Regional High School, Old Tappan. Jacobs is the son of Rafael Jacobs, who works as a lawyer, and Marti Jacobs. He has a brother, Douglas Jacobs, who is the president of Integrated Sports Media, a sports firm, located in Hoboken. Jacobs is also a graduate of the Tisch School of the Arts. During a hiatus from the school in 1986, he worked as an assistant director to John Sayles on the independent film Matewan.

== Career ==
Jacobs has been active as an assistant director in his career for film directors such as the Coen brothers, Richard Linklater, Sayles, John Schlesinger and Steven Soderbergh. Jacobs first began cooperating with Soderbergh in 1993 on King of the Hill. In 2004, Jacobs released Criminal, his first feature film as a director, which he also wrote the script and helped produce. His second project was Wind Chill, announced in October 2005. It premiered in 2007. In March 2014, it was reported that Jacobs would helm Magic Mike XXL, the sequel to the first film, with Soderbergh acting instead as an executive producer, cinematographer and film editor.

== Awards ==
For his involvement as one of the producers of Behind the Candelabra, Jacobs won an Emmy Award in the category Outstanding Miniseries or Movie, which he shared along with Jerry Weintraub, Susan Ekins and Michael Polaire. The same year, he was also the recipient of the Directors Guild of America Award for Outstanding Directorial Achievement in Movies for Television and Mini-Series, as well as the PGA Award, Outstanding Producer of Long-Form Television.

== Filmography ==
=== Film ===
Year	Title	Director	Writer	Producer
2004	Criminal	Yes	Yes	Yes
2007	Wind Chill	Yes	No	No
2015	Magic Mike XXL	Yes	No	Yes
2015	Blackway	No	Yes	Yes

Producer only

- Full Frontal (2002)
- Eros (2004) (Segment "Equilibrium")
- Bubble (2005)
- The Good German (2006)
- The Girlfriend Experience (2009)
- The Informant! (2009)
- Contagion (2011)
- Haywire (2011)
- Magic Mike (2012)
- Side Effects (2013)
- Edge of Tomorrow (2014)
- Logan Lucky (2017)
- The Laundromat (2019)
- Dog (2022)
- Magic Mike's Last Dance (2023)
- Black Bag (2025)

Executive producer

- Solaris (2002)
- Ocean's Thirteen (2007)
- Che (2008)

First assistant director

- Lonely Hearts (1991)
- Under Cover of Darkness (1992)
- Simple Men (1992)
- Family Prayers (1993)
- The Music of Chance (1993)
- King of the Hill (1993)
- Naked in New York (1993)
- Amateur (1994)
- The Underneath (1995)
- Pie in the Sky (1995)
- Eye for an Eye (1996)
- A Very Brady Sequel (1996)
- The Newton Boys (1998)
- Out of Sight (1998)
- I'll Be Home for Christmas (1998)
- The Limey (1999)
- Erin Brockovich (2000)
- Price of Glory (2000) (Second unit)
- Traffic (2000)
- Ocean's Eleven (2001)

Second assistant director

- Tune in Tomorrow (1990)
- Miller's Crossing (1990)
- City of Hope (1991)
- Thousand Pieces of Gold (1991)
- Freddy's Dead: The Final Nightmare (1991)
- Little Man Tate (1991)

Assistant director

- Elliot Fauman, Ph.D. (1990)
- Foreign Student (1994)
- Goodbye Lover (1998)

Other credits

Year	Title	Role
1989	Shag	Additional second assistant director
1992	The Gun in Betty Lou's Handbag	Assistant production supervisor (Second unit)
1995	Before Sunrise	Associate producer
2004	Ocean's Twelve	Co-producer

=== Television ===
Year	Title	Director	Writer	Producer	Notes
2013	Behind the Candelabra	No	No	Yes	TV movie
2014–15	The Knick	No	No	Executive	20 episodes
2014–17	Red Oaks	No	Yes	Executive	
2023	Extrapolations	Yes	Yes	Executive	Episode "2047: The Fifth Question"
2024	Apples Never Fall	No	No	Executive	
