= 6 Balloons =

- Official poster
- Directed by: Marja-Lewis Ryan
- Written by: Marja-Lewis Ryan
- Produced by: Reid Carolin; Ross M. Dinerstein; Samantha Housman; Peter Kiernan; Channing Tatum
- Starring: Abbi Jacobson; Dave Franco; Charlotte Carel; Madeline Carel; Dawan Owens; Jen Tullock; Maya Erskine; Tim Matheson; Jane Kaczmarek
- Cinematography: Polly Morgan
- Edited by: Brian Scofield
- Music by: Heather McIntosh
- Production companies: Campfire; Free Association
- Distributed by: Netflix
- Release dates: March 12, 2018 (SXSW); April 6, 2018 (United States)
- Running time: 74 minutes
- Country: United States
- Language: English

6 Balloons is a 2018 American drama film written and directed by Marja-Lewis Ryan and starring Abbi Jacobson, Dave Franco, Charlotte Carel, Madeline Carel, Dawan Owens, Jen Tullock, Maya Erskine, Tim Matheson and Jane Kaczmarek.

The film had its world premiere at South by Southwest on March 12, 2018. It was released on April 6, 2018, by Netflix.

== Plot ==
Katie prepares a surprise birthday party for her boyfriend Jack on the 4th of July. While setting up the decorations, she exhibits Type-A quirks and consistently attempts to keep things on schedule. As her parents, Gayle and Gary, and her friends continue to set up, Katie leaves to pick up the cake and makes a stop to pick up her brother Seth and his young daughter Ella. Throughout the film, Katie has hallucinations of Seth and her drowning as the car inexplicably fills with water; meanwhile, an audio book narrator reads from a story where a woman fails to properly sail a boat and drowns as a result.

Katie sees piles of unopened mail inside Seth's apartment, leading her to suspect that Seth has relapsed in his heroin addiction. She drives around town trying to find a detox center as his previous one denies his health insurance. After sending Seth to a downtown detox center in a taxi and returning to the party with a sleeping Ella, Katie receives a call that Seth is unable to be admitted. She finds him in a sickly state and continues to search for a center throughout the Los Angeles area, missing Jack's arrival to the surprise party. Seth pleads with Katie to buy heroin for him for pain relief, and she gets it in a homeless area near Skid Row, packaged inside six small balloons. Returning to the car, Seth asks her to go back and buy a needle from a man living under a tarp. Katie refuses so they all head to a nearby drug store.

At the drug store, the pharmacist realizes that Seth is a heroin user and gives Katie the key to the bathroom where she changes Ella's diaper. Seth prepares his injection in a vacant stall as Katie pleads with him to not use very much. He becomes revitalized and the three depart. Before leaving, Seth hands Katie the key to the bathroom and laughs about her having to take it back to the now closed pharmacy. Katie argues with the pharmacist, throwing the bathroom key at the pharmacy door, which sets off the alarm, causing her to run back to the car and drive off. On their way back to the party, she reminisces with Seth about their childhood and they stop by the bakery to get the cake. In the car, Seth promises his latest injection is his final use of heroin.

Back at the party, Katie's parents and Jack realize Seth is under the influence, given his obnoxious and giddy behavior. They confront Katie over the night's events and she assumes guilt. Seth leaves Ella in the backyard while he leaves to use; Ella begins to look for him throughout the house. Katie finds Seth injecting again in her car. She tells him that she will no longer take care of him, insisting that the only way for him to kick his addiction for good is to check-in to rehabilitation without her help.

Katie, no longer burdened by Seth or the hallucinations, steps out of the car onto the street and admires the night sky filled with fireworks.

== Cast ==
- Abbi Jacobson as Katie (Seth's sister, Jack's girlfriend and Gayle's daughter)
- Dave Franco as Seth (Katie's brother and Gayle's son)
- Tim Matheson as Gary
- Jane Kaczmarek as Gayle (Seth and Katie's mother)
- Maya Erskine as Cameron
- Dawan Owens as Jack (Katie's boyfriend)
- Jen Tullock as Bianca

== Production ==
In October 2016, Abbi Jacobson, Dave Franco, Tim Matheson, and Jane Kaczmarek joined the cast of the film, while Marja-Lewis Ryan directed the film from the screenplay she wrote. Samantha Housman, Ross Dinerstein, Channing Tatum, Reid Carolin and Peter Kiernan produced the film under their Campfire and Free Association banners respectively.

Principal photography began in October 2016.

== Release ==
The film had its world premiere at South by Southwest on March 12, 2018. It was released on April 6, 2018.

=== Critical reception ===
On review aggregator website Rotten Tomatoes, the film holds an approval rating of 86% based on 29 reviews, and an average rating of 6.6/10. The website's critical consensus reads, "Delicately sketched but thematically rich, 6 Balloons rises on Abbi Jacobson's gripping performance -- and marks writer-director Marja-Lewis Ryan as a talent to watch." On Metacritic, the film has a weighted average score of 66 out of 100, based on 7 critics, indicating "generally favorable" reviews.

Writing for RogerEbert.com, Brian Tallerico gave the film 3 out of 4 stars, highlighting the relationship between Katie and Seth as the movie's strongest aspect. He wrote, "They’re so fully-realized that I wanted a bit more to their story, but I also admire Ryan’s no-nonsense approach to a tight narrative. Katie is planning a surprise party in “6 Balloons” and this is one of the most unexpected, moving surprises of the year so far."
