= Dog (2022 film) =

2022 film directed by Channing Tatum and Reid Carolin

- Theatrical release poster
- Directed by: Channing Tatum; Reid Carolin
- Screenplay by: Reid Carolin
- Story by: Reid Carolin; Brett Rodriguez
- Produced by: Gregory Jacobs; Channing Tatum; Peter Kiernan; Brett Rodriguez
- Starring: Channing Tatum; Jane Adams; Kevin Nash; Q'orianka Kilcher; Ethan Suplee; Emmy Raver-Lampman; Nicole LaLiberte
- Cinematography: Newton Thomas Sigel
- Edited by: Leslie Jones
- Music by: Thomas Newman
- Production companies: FilmNation Entertainment; Free Association
- Distributed by: Metro-Goldwyn-Mayer Pictures (through United Artists Releasing)
- Release date: February 18, 2022
- Running time: 101 minutes
- Country: United States
- Language: English
- Budget: $15 million
- Box office: $84.6 million

Dog is a 2022 American comedy drama road film directed by Channing Tatum and Reid Carolin, both making their respective film directorial debuts, based on a story by Carolin and Brett Rodriguez. The film stars Tatum as an Army Ranger who is tasked with escorting the military dog of his fallen friend to his funeral. The film also stars Jane Adams, Kevin Nash, Q'orianka Kilcher, Ethan Suplee, Emmy Raver-Lampman, and Nicole LaLiberte in supporting roles. The film was produced by Free Association on a budget of $15 million.

The film was released in the United States on February 18, 2022, by United Artists Releasing. The film received generally positive reviews from critics, praising Tatum's direction and performance, and was also a box office success, grossing $85 million worldwide.

== Plot ==
Jackson Briggs, a former U.S. Army Ranger suffering from PTSD, tries to apply for a rotation position in Pakistan, but is deemed unfit for service due to a brain injury. He is notified that his friend and former partner, Riley Rodriguez, was killed in a car crash the night before. The morning after attending a memorial service at a local bar, Briggs is called in to Fort Lewis on a special assignment to escort Riley's military dog, Lulu, a female Belgian Malinois with a history of aggressive behavior, to attend his funeral in Nogales, Arizona, after which he is to bring her to White Sands, where she will be euthanized. Initially hesitant, Briggs agrees when his former company commander, Captain Jones, promises to recommend him for the rotation position.

On the road, when Briggs stops at a shooting range, Lulu is disturbed by the sound of gunfire due to her military experiences. She breaks out of her cage, and destroys the passenger seat of his 1984 Ford Bronco. Frustrated, Briggs gives her Benadryl hidden in a hot dog, causing Lulu to fall asleep. In Portland, Oregon, Briggs tries to hit on various women at a bar, but most are repelled by his brash personality. Outside, Lulu draws the attention of two friends, Bella and Zoe, who invite Briggs back to their house. While he is inside, Lulu's barking alerts a neighbor. Believing her to be the victim of abuse, the neighbor smashes the rear windshield, but she promptly attacks him. Briggs runs outside and pulls them apart, but Bella and Zoe are disturbed by the display and lock Briggs outside.

The next morning, while on the Pacific Coast Highway, Lulu climbs out the broken rear windshield, forcing Briggs to pull over and chase her through a nearby forest. They stumble across a marijuana farm, where Briggs is tranquilized by the farm's owner, Gus. He wakes up tied to a chair, but is able to escape. Lulu is being treated by Gus's wife, Tamara, as she has injured her paw. Briggs and Gus reconcile by looking through Lulu's "I Love Me" book, which contains photos from her service during the War in Afghanistan.

In San Francisco, Briggs cons his way into a free room at a luxury hotel by pretending to be a blind veteran, with Lulu as his seeing-eye dog. He tries to leave for the evening, but Lulu barks until Briggs relents and takes her with him. In the lobby, Lulu attacks a Middle Eastern man wearing a thawb, Dr. Al-Farid, due to her military training. Briggs is arrested under suspicion of committing a hate crime. During a lineup at the station, Briggs apologizes to Al-Farid, who agrees not to press charges on the condition that Briggs seek professional help. While retrieving Lulu from animal control, an employee explains that Lulu's heavy panting is an expression of anxiety. In Los Angeles, Briggs tries to visit his 3-year-old daughter, Sam, but his wife, Niki, does not allow it. Briggs visits Noah, a former Army Ranger who adopted and rehabilitated Lulu's brother, Nuke. Noah teaches Briggs to bond with Lulu in terms she understands, allowing him to form a deeper connection with her.

The Bronco breaks down during a thunderstorm, forcing Briggs and Lulu to shelter in an abandoned barn. The next morning, Briggs and Lulu hitchhike to Nogales in time for the funeral, where Briggs reassures her during the traditional rifle salute. He calls Jones and tells him that he is hopeful that Lulu will not have to be put down due to her improvements over the trip, but Jones tells him that the decision is not up to them. Briggs drives into the desert and encourages Lulu to run away, but she refuses. While staying the night in a motel, Briggs has a panic attack and seizure, but is comforted by Lulu.

In the morning, Briggs hands Lulu off at White Sands, but cannot bring himself to drive away when he sees her distress at him leaving. He returns and takes Lulu back, driving away with her. Months later, after successfully adopting Lulu, Briggs writes a letter thanking her for saving his life and making him a better man. Briggs is shown to have reconciled with Niki and Sam, as well as begun connecting with Noah and other retired veterans.

== Cast ==
- Channing Tatum as Jackson Briggs
- Jane Adams as Tamara
- Kevin Nash as Gus
- Q'orianka Kilcher as Niki
- Ethan Suplee as Noah
- Emmy Raver-Lampman as Bella
- Nicole LaLiberte as Zoe
- Luke Forbes as Captain Jones
- Ronnie Gene Blevins as Keith
- Aqueela Zoll as Callan
- Junes Zahdi as Dr. Al-Farid
- Amanda Booth as Tiffany
- Cayden Boyd as Corporal Levitz
- Alex West as Holding Cell Prisoner

Eric Urbiztondo appears as Riley Rodriguez in photographs. Lulu was played by three identical Belgian Malinois dogs named Britta, Zuza, and Lana, where Nuke was played by a Belgian Malinois named Sam. Comedian Bill Burr makes an uncredited cameo appearance as a San Francisco police officer.

== Production ==
The film was inspired by a real road trip director Channing Tatum took with his dying dog, a pitbull mix also named Lulu, after she was diagnosed with cancer in 2018. Tatum told Yahoo! News: "When I went on my last road trip with my puppy, [I experienced] that feeling of, 'There's nothing I can do. There's nothing left to do. You just have to accept it and be thankful for the time that you did get and know that they're not supposed to be here forever. I'm supposed to go on and she has to go someplace else." Tatum's dog died on December 19, 2018, and the film is dedicated to her memory. Tatum described the filmmaking process as "cathartic", telling Forbes that: "It gave me a lot of perspective on what she meant to me, what her purpose was in this life that we had together."

On November 5, 2019, Tatum and Reid Carolin were announced as the directors, both to be making their directorial debuts, from a script Carolin wrote with Brett Rodriguez. Tatum and Carolin would also act as producers, alongside Peter Kiernan and Gregory Jacobs, through Tatum and Carolin's production company Free Association. Tatum, Carolin, and Rodriguez previously collaborated as executive producers on War Dog: A Soldier's Best Friend (2017), an HBO documentary that explored the relationship between soldiers and their military working dogs. On March 2, 2020, Metro-Goldwyn-Mayer acquired North American distribution rights to the film.

In addition to co-directing the film, Tatum also stars in the lead role. On November 15, 2019, principal photography was announced set to start in the middle of 2020. It filmed in Valencia and Lancaster, California, amid the COVID-19 pandemic. In December 2020, Q'orianka Kilcher was added to the cast. Composer Thomas Newman composed the score for Dog.

== Release ==
=== Theatrical ===
The film was originally scheduled to be released in the United States on February 12, 2021, by Metro-Goldwyn-Mayer, but was pushed back to July, due to the COVID-19 pandemic. The date was later revealed to be July 16. It was then pushed back again to February 18, 2022.

=== Marketing ===
According to iSpot, United Artists Releasing spent $16.3 million in television spots that generated 1.17 billion impressions. The film was particularly advertised on Fox News, CBS, TLC, NBC, and ABC across programs including the Winter Olympics, the NFL, re-runs of Friends, and Hannity. According to social media firm RelishMix, social digital awareness hit 81.9 million across Facebook, Twitter, YouTube, and Instagram before opening. Tatum's 45.6 million followers on social media were highlighted as a significant factor in the film's box office performance.

=== Home media ===
The film was released digitally on March 11, 2022, followed by a Blu-ray and DVD release on May 10, 2022, by Warner Bros. Home Entertainment. The film was released to Amazon Prime Video on September 16, 2022, 210 days after its theatrical release.

== Reception ==
=== Box office ===
Dog grossed $61.8 million in the United States and Canada, and $23.2 million in other territories, for a worldwide total of $85 million.

In the United States and Canada, Dog was released alongside Uncharted and The Cursed, and was projected to gross $6–11 million from 3,677 theaters in its opening weekend, and $7.5–14 million over the four-day Presidents' Day holiday frame. The film earned $5 million on its first day, including $1.26 million from Valentine's Day (February 14) and Thursday night previews. Its opening surpassed projections, grossing $14.9 million in three days and $17.4 million for the four day weekend, finishing second at the box office behind Uncharted. Overall audiences during its opening were 54% female, 73% above the age of 25, 53% above 35, and 37% above 45. The film grossed $10.2 million in its second weekend, remaining in second place behind Uncharted. It later made $6.1 million in its third, $5.2 million in its fourth, $4 million in its fifth, $2.1 million in its sixth, $1.3 million in its seventh, and $514,606 in its eighth. The film dropped out of the box office top ten in its ninth weekend, finishing twelfth with $143,811.

=== Critical response ===
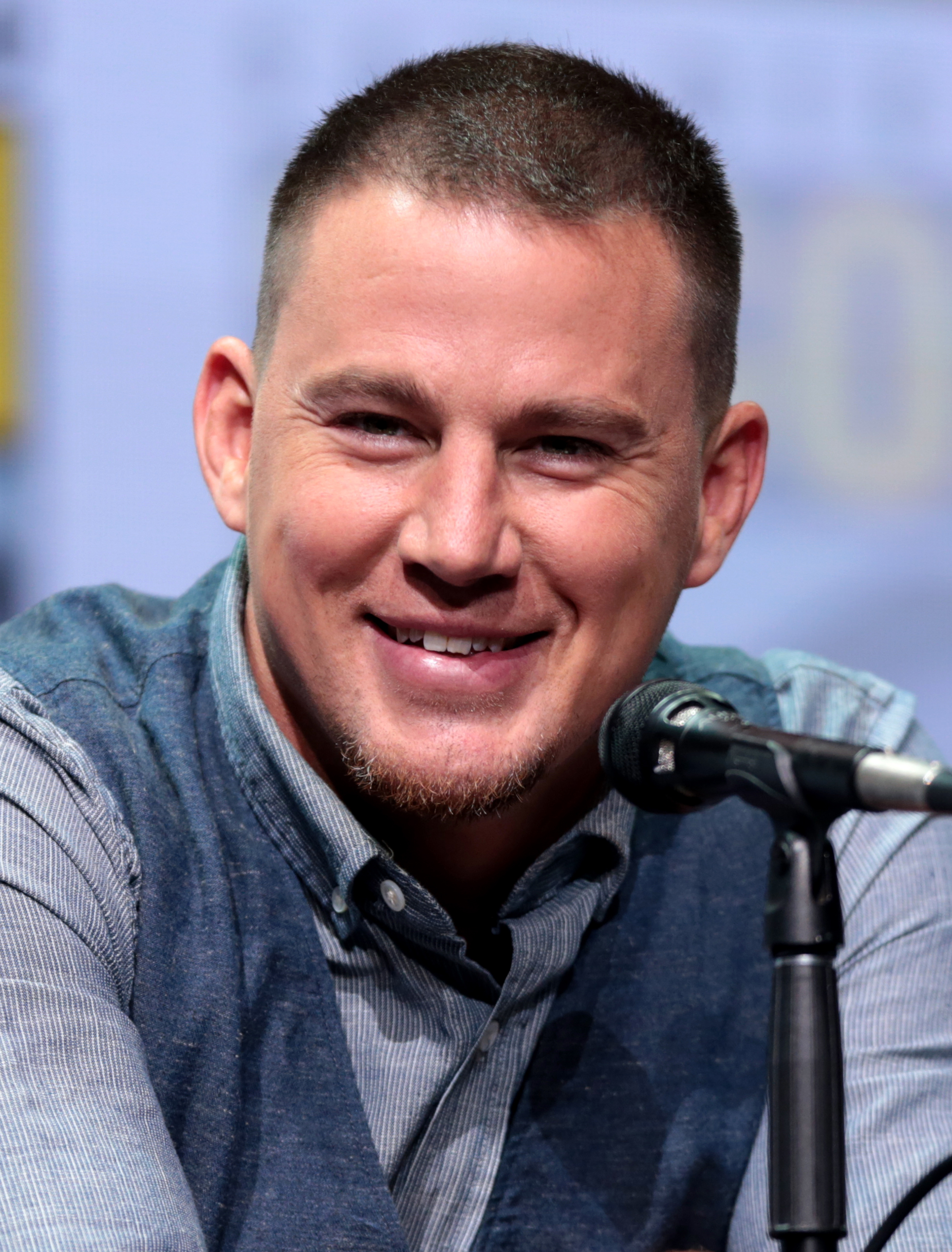
Channing Tatum received praise from critics for his performance and direction.

On the review aggregator website Rotten Tomatoes, 77% of 156 critics' reviews are positive, with an average rating of 6.2/10. The website's consensus reads: "Dog's dramatic breed is far from exotic, but solid narrative bones and well-trained work from co-director/star Channing Tatum make for a fetching viewing experience." Metacritic, which uses a weighted average, assigned the film a score of 61 out of 100, based on 33 critics, indicating "generally favorable" reviews. Audiences polled by CinemaScore gave the film an average grade of "A−" on an A+ to F scale, while those at PostTrak gave it an 82% positive score, with 66% saying they would definitely recommend it. Some critics found the film misclassified as a comedy.

== Music ==
The score was written by Thomas Newman. An official soundtrack has not been released for the film. The film contains music licensed from artists such as Kurt Vile, A Tribe Called Quest, Anderson .Paak, My Morning Jacket, Alabama Shakes, John Prine, Chris Stapleton and Kenny Rogers. Season Kent was credited as the music supervisor for the film and was solely responsible for selecting the credited songs.
