= The War Tapes =

2006 American documentary film

- Film poster
- Directed by: Deborah Scranton
- Produced by: Robert May; Steve James
- Starring: Zack Bazzi, Michael Moriarty, Stephen Pink
- Cinematography: P.H. O'Brien; Peter Ciardelli
- Edited by: Steve James; Leslie Simmer
- Music by: Norman Arnold
- Release date: April 29, 2006
- Running time: 97 min.
- Language: English

The War Tapes is a 2006 American war documentary film directed by Deborah Scranton. The film is the first documentary account of the 2003 invasion of Iraq to be produced by the soldiers themselves. The film follows three New Hampshire Army National Guard soldiers before, during, and after their deployment to Iraq about a year after the invasion. Their unit was Charlie Company, 3rd Battalion, 172nd Infantry Regiment (Mountain), which deployed from March 2004 to February 2005.

The three soldiers with cameras featured in the film are SPC Michael Moriarty, SGT Stephen Pink, and SGT Zack Bazzi. Two other soldiers, SGT Duncan Domey and SPC Brandon Wilkins, also filmed their entire deployments for the film. In all, 17 soldiers were given cameras and recorded 800 hours of tape in Iraq. Stateside interviews with the soldiers and their families made up an additional 200 hours of tape. The "cast" was narrowed to three soldiers for the final feature-length film. The film won the prize for Best Documentary Feature at the Tribeca Film Festival in May 2006.

== Reception ==
On review aggregator website Rotten Tomatoes, the film holds an approval rating of 98% based on 65 reviews, with an average rating of 8.1/10.
