= Magic Mike's Last Dance =

2023 American film by Steven Soderbergh

- Theatrical release poster
- Directed by: Steven Soderbergh
- Written by: Reid Carolin
- Produced by: Nick Wechsler; Gregory Jacobs; Channing Tatum; Reid Carolin; Peter Kiernan
- Starring: Channing Tatum; Salma Hayek Pinault
- Cinematography: Peter Andrews (Note: Pseudonym for Steven Soderbergh.)
- Edited by: Mary Ann Bernard
- Production companies: Nick Wechsler Productions; Free Association
- Distributed by: Warner Bros. Pictures
- Release dates: January 25, 2023 (Miami Beach); February 10, 2023 (United States)
- Running time: 112 minutes
- Country: United States
- Language: English
- Budget: $45 million
- Box office: $57.1 million

Magic Mike's Last Dance is a 2023 American comedy drama film directed by Steven Soderbergh, written by Reid Carolin, and produced by Channing Tatum. It is the third and final installment in the Magic Mike trilogy, following Magic Mike (2012) and Magic Mike XXL (2015). The film stars Tatum as the titular retired male stripper, who leaves Florida for London to help a socialite (Salma Hayek Pinault) produce a stage play.

The film was originally intended for an exclusive digital release on Max, but following strong test screenings, Warner Bros. Pictures opted to give it a theatrical release. Magic Mike's Last Dance had its premiere at Miami Beach on January 25, 2023, and was released in the United States on February 9, 2023. The film grossed $57 million worldwide and received mixed reviews from critics.

== Plot ==
Former male stripper Mike Lane, who lost his furniture business during the COVID-19 pandemic, is now in his forties, still in Miami and a bartender for a catering company. At Maxandra "Max" Mendoza's fundraising event, he is recognized by Kim, a woman he performed for 10 years prior, now a lawyer for Max's foundation and happily married. Afterward, Mike is asked to speak with Max privately.

Alone, Max says Kim told her about his prowess and asks how much for a lap dance. Mike says he is retired, but ultimately says $60,000 when pushed. Max offers $6,000 with no 'happy ending'. The dance is very passionate, and they wake up together the next day.

The next morning, Mike refuses the $6,000, but Max offers him the $60,000 to accompany her to London for a month for a "job". Mike agrees but says he is done dancing. She insists it is strictly business (no sex), and Mike agrees to accompany her. Max's ex-husband Roger gave her the Rattigan Theatre in their divorce settlement and she announces that its current theatrical production of the play Isabel Ascendant will be halted for one month so Mike can choreograph a special dance production.

As Mike and Max discuss the logistics of this show she has come up with, her teenage daughter Zadie arrives. Distrustful of him, she explains that her mother tries to reinvent herself every few years.

Auditions for potential dancers are soon underway. An actress from the original Isabel Ascendant production shows up, wanting to participate. This inspires them to rethink the new show with elements of the original, prompting them to cast her. At dinner with Max and a few of her London contacts, Mike feels out of his element, and Max's friends say she will never divorce.

Later on, in the car, when Max moves toward physical intimacy with Mike and he pulls back, it upsets her. The next day in rehearsal, she is excessively critical of his choreography.

Max and Mike build a temporary extension of the stage, so the show has a much more palpable feel, but the Mayor and the Westminster City Council threaten sanctions because of their alterations to the historical building without prior approval. To persuade Edna Eaglebauer, the only woman on the board to support the show, they fill her morning bus with the performers from the show who do a choreographed dance just for her. She gives them her seal of approval.

Mike and Max argue about the ending of the show. She wants him to personalize it and finish with a happy ending. She also would really like him to dance in it, but he reiterates he is retired and will not go on stage. When the show is shut down again, Max confronts Roger. He reminds her that their separation agreement includes a clause barring her from tarnishing his family name.

After Max tells Mike to return to the United States, he gets the keys to the theater through Victor and rehearsals resume secretly. The show is not open to the general public, but rather by invitation only, with Zadie tapping into her mother's contacts. Sunday evening arrives, and Victor and Zadie drag Max out for the show she believed she had shut down; even Roger is invited.

The opening act starts the same as Isabel Ascendant, but the protagonist is offered only two possible life choices, marry the rich aristocrat or the poor one with a heart of gold. She calls her imaginary friend from her childhood, the unicorn. Breaking the fourth wall, she then talks about modern feminist ideas about what choices women should be afforded, using a golden mic that drops from above. Then Isabel's male counterparts strip off their formal attire and the other dancers are presented one by one, all delivering sexier and sexier numbers.

After a lap dance number for three of the more mature audience members, Mike partners with a ballet dancer for the final performance. The piece, performed under artificial rain, is reminiscent of moments shared between him and Max. After the show, Mike finds Max, who informs him that she is now free and broke. Unfazed by the financial news and relieved by her freedom, Mike kisses her.

== Cast ==
- Channing Tatum as Mike Lane
- Salma Hayek Pinault as Maxandra Mendoza
- Ethan Lawrence as Woody
- Ayub Khan Din as Victor
- Jemelia George as Zadie Rattigan, Maxandra Mendoza's adopted daughter
- Juliette Motamed as Hannah
- Vicki Pepperdine as Edna Eaglebauer
- Gavin Spokes as Matthew
- Alan Cox as Roger Rattigan, Maxandra Mendoza's estranged husband
- Caitlin Gerard as Kim
- Christopher Bencomo as Kim's Husband
- Joe Manganiello as Big Dick Richie
- Matt Bomer as Ken
- Kevin Nash as Tarzan
- Adam Rodriguez as Tito
- Suzanne Bertish as Renata
- Kylie Shea as the ballerina

== Development ==
The next installment in the franchise was announced on November 29, 2021, to be released under the title Magic Mike's Last Dance on HBO Max, with Channing Tatum once again playing Mike Lane and Steven Soderbergh, who directed the first film in the series, returning to direct. Thandiwe Newton was initially cast in an unspecified role but was replaced by Salma Hayek in April 2022.

In July 2022, Soderbergh announced that there were developments ongoing for additional installments in the franchise for stories centered around other characters unrelated to Mike Lane. In September 2022, it was announced the film would now be released in theaters, receiving a release date of February 10, 2023.

In November 2022, Gavin Spokes, Caitlin Gerard, Christopher Bencomo, Ayub Khan Din, and Juliette Motamed were revealed as co-stars alongside Tatum and Hayek.

== Release ==
Magic Mike's Last Dance had its world premiere in Miami Beach, Florida on January 25, 2023, and was theatrically released on February 10, 2023, by Warner Bros. Pictures. It is Soderbergh's first film to be given a full theatrical release since Unsane (2018). Marketing largely relied on TV spots on Warner Bros. Discovery channels. iSpot estimated that Warner Bros. spent "just under" $9 million on the TV spots.

The film was released for VOD on February 28, 2023, followed with a Blu-ray and DVD release by Warner Bros. Home Entertainment on April 18, 2023. It began streaming on Max on June 2, 2023.

== Reception ==
=== Box office ===
Magic Mike's Last Dance grossed $26 million in the United States and Canada, and $31.1 million in other territories, for a worldwide total of $57.1 million.

In the United States and Canada, Magic Mike's Last Dance was projected to gross $8–10 million from 1,496 theaters in its opening weekend. It made $4.1 million on its first day and a total of $8.2 million in its opening weekend, topping the box office. The film expanded to 3,034 theaters the following weekend, making $5.3 million and finishing in third.

=== Critical response ===
On the review aggregator website Rotten Tomatoes, 48% of 230 critics' reviews are positive, with an average rating of 5.5/10. The website's consensus reads: "Magic Mike's Last Dance is loose and limber enough to entertain, although it's hard to escape the feeling that this franchise has lost a step or two along the way." Metacritic, which uses a weighted average, assigned the film a score of 52 out of 100, based on 54 critics, indicating "mixed or average" reviews.

Writing for CBC, Eli Glasner said "the love story is limp", but praised Tatum's performance: "If dry humping was an art, Channing Tatum would be Picasso".

Writing for Film Cred, critic Maxance Vincent wrote that "Soderbergh took his time for Magic Mike's Last Dance but satisfyingly concludes the trilogy by having Mike's career ending on a high with his newfound friends and someone who loves him for who he is. Like Ocean's Twelve (and Thirteen), I'm fairly confident that Magic Mike's Last Dance will be reevaluated in a few years as one of Soderbergh's best motion pictures."

=== Accolades ===
Award / Film Festival	Date of ceremony	Category	Recipient(s)	Result	Ref.
Golden Raspberry Awards	March 9, 2024	Worst Actress	Salma Hayek	Nominated	
Golden Raspberry Awards	March 9, 2024	Worst Screen Combo	Salma Hayek and Channing Tatum	Nominated	
