= Channing Tatum =

American actor (born 1980)

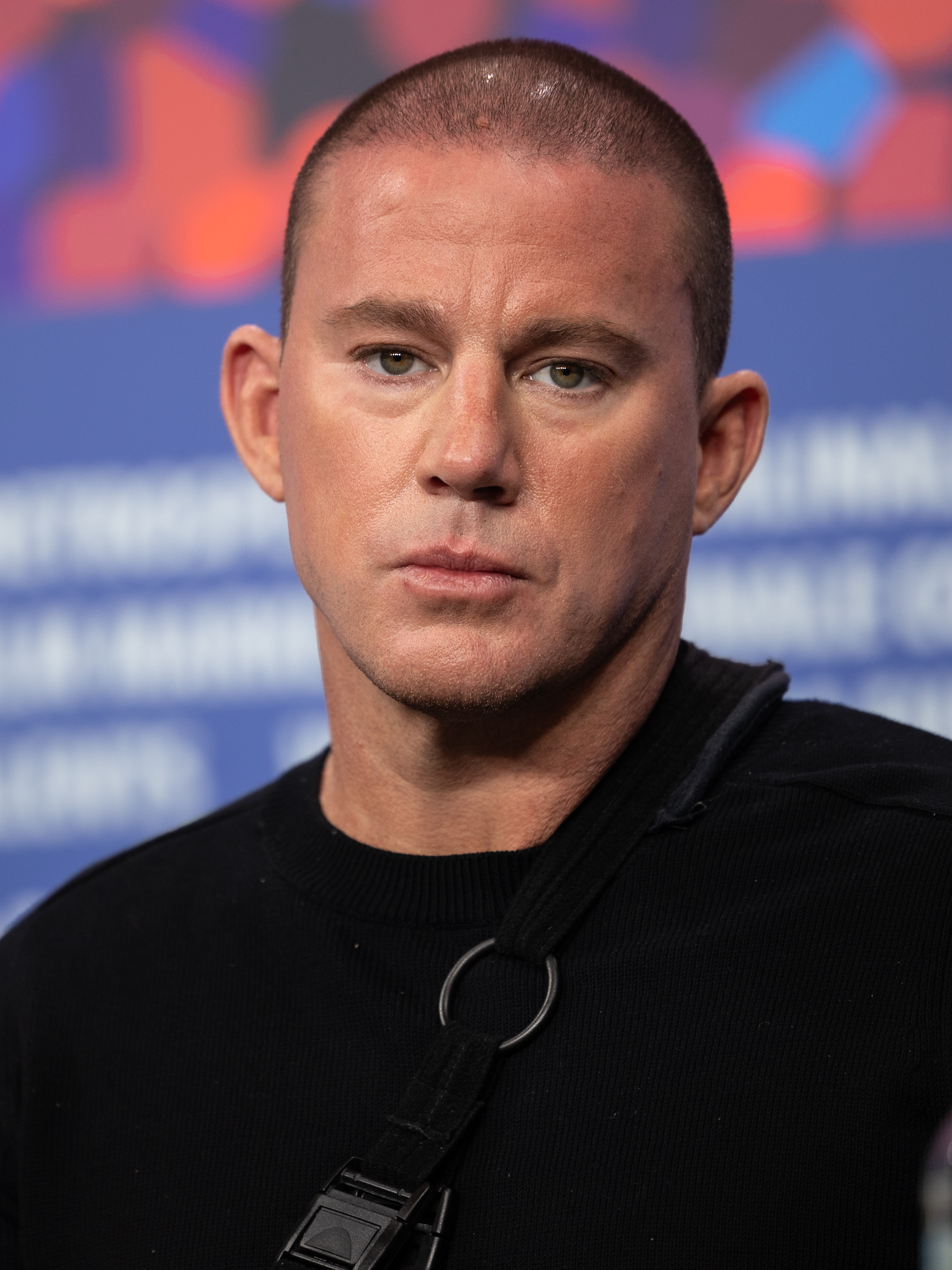
- Tatum in 2026
- Born: Channing Matthew Tatum; April 26, 1980 (age 46); Cullman, Alabama, U.S.
- Occupations: Actor; producer; director; model; dancer
- Years active: 2000–present
- Spouse: Jenna Dewan (m. 2009; div. 2019)
- Partner: Zoë Kravitz (2021–2024)
- Children: 1
- Awards: Full list

Channing Matthew Tatum (born April 26, 1980) is an American actor and film producer. He made his film debut in the drama Coach Carter (2005), and had his breakthrough with the sports comedy film She's the Man (2006) and the dance film Step Up (2006). He rose to prominence for playing Duke in the action films G.I. Joe: The Rise of Cobra (2009) and G.I. Joe: Retaliation (2013), the title role in the comedy-drama films Magic Mike (2012), Magic Mike XXL (2015) and Magic Mike's Last Dance (2023), and an undercover cop in the action-comedy films 21 Jump Street (2012) and 22 Jump Street (2014).

Tatum's other films include The Vow (2012), White House Down (2013), Foxcatcher (2014), The Hateful Eight (2015), Hail, Caesar! (2016), Logan Lucky (2017), The Lost City (2022), and Deadpool & Wolverine (2024). He has produced several of his films, including the road film Dog (2022), which he also starred in and co-directed. He was listed as one of Time's 100 most influential people in the world in 2022.

== Early life and education ==
Channing Matthew Tatum was born on April 26, 1980, in Cullman, Alabama, to Kay Tatum (née Faust), an airline worker, and Glenn Tatum, a construction worker. He has a sister named Paige. He is of Irish, French, and German ancestry. His family moved to Gautier, Mississippi, in the Pascagoula area, when he was six. Until he was ten years old, he lived in a rural setting near the bayous along the Pascagoula River.

Tatum has discussed having dealt with attention deficit disorder (ADD) and dyslexia while growing up, which affected his ability to do well in school. In his youth, Tatum participated in football, soccer, track, baseball, and wuzuquan kung fu.

Tatum spent most of his teenage years in the Tampa area, where he initially attended Gaither High School. His parents wanted more effort and gave him the option of selecting a private high school or attending a military school; he chose Tampa Catholic High School, where he graduated in 1998 and was voted most athletic. He later attended Glenville State College in Glenville, West Virginia on a football scholarship, but dropped out.

Us Weekly reported that around this time Tatum left his job as a roofer and began working as a stripper at a local nightclub under the name "Chan Crawford". In 2010, he told an Australian newspaper that he wanted to make a film about his experiences as a stripper. That idea led to the film Magic Mike.

== Career ==
=== 2000s ===
In 2000, Tatum was first cast as a dancer in Ricky Martin's "She Bangs" music video, after an audition in Orlando, Florida; he was paid $400 for the job. His experience in the fashion industry began as a model working for noted clients such as Armani and Abercrombie & Fitch. He soon moved into television commercials, landing national spots for Mountain Dew and Pepsi in 2002. He subsequently signed with Page 305 (Page Parkes Modeling Agency), a modeling agency in Miami. He was cast by Al David for Vogue magazine and soon after appeared in campaigns for Abercrombie & Fitch, Nautica, Dolce & Gabbana, American Eagle Outfitters, and Emporio Armani. He was picked as one of Tear Sheet magazine's "50 Most Beautiful Faces" of October 2001. Tatum signed with Ford Models in New York City.

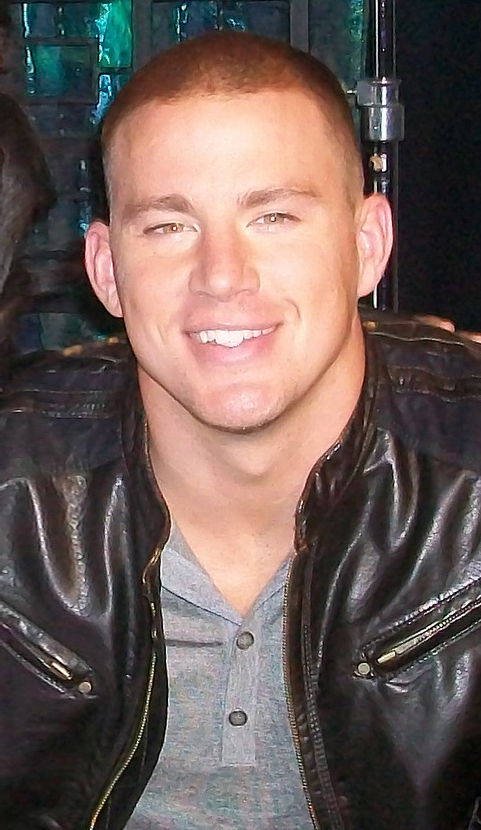
Tatum in 2009

In 2006, Tatum starred in She's the Man opposite Amanda Bynes, which was named "the greatest Shakespeare adaptation since 10 Things I Hate About You by Business Insider. Later that year, Tatum starred opposite his future wife Jenna Dewan in Step Up, which was his breakout role. Although it was widely panned, it has earned $115 million worldwide.

In 2008, Tatum co-starred in director Kimberly Peirce's film Stop-Loss, about soldiers returning home from the Iraq War, and in director Stuart Townsend's film Battle in Seattle, about the 1999 protest of the World Trade Organization meeting in Seattle. Tatum played in the short film The Trap, directed by Rita Wilson.

Tatum and Dito Montiel, who worked together on A Guide to Recognizing Your Saints, reteamed on the action drama Fighting for Rogue Pictures. He starred as Shawn MacArthur, a young man who starts out selling counterfeit goods in New York City. He next appeared in writer/director/producer Michael Mann's 2009 crime drama Public Enemies, playing the 1930s American gangster Pretty Boy Floyd. The same year, Tatum starred as Duke in G.I. Joe: The Rise of Cobra, Paramount Pictures' live-action film based on the popular Hasbro action figures. He was initially reluctant to take the role as he feared the film would glorify war, but overcame his reluctance after reading the script. He played a soldier in Dear John, a film based on the popular Nicholas Sparks bestseller. He later said that he accepted the role to learn from director Lasse Hallström because he never studied at an acting school.

=== 2010s ===
In 2012, Tatum hosted Saturday Night Live and appeared in four films. He co-starred in Steven Soderbergh's action-thriller Haywire, The Vow with Rachel McAdams, and 21 Jump Street (film adaptation of TV series of the same name) with Jonah Hill.

Tatum also starred in Magic Mike, a film based on his eight-month experience as a stripper in Florida. The film was directed by Soderbergh, was co-produced by Tatum and Soderbergh, and starred Tatum as Mike. He is a featured performer at a Tampa, Florida, male strip club who takes a younger dancer (Alex Pettyfer) under his wing to show him how to hustle "on and off stage". The film's cast also included Matt Bomer, Joe Manganiello, and Matthew McConaughey.

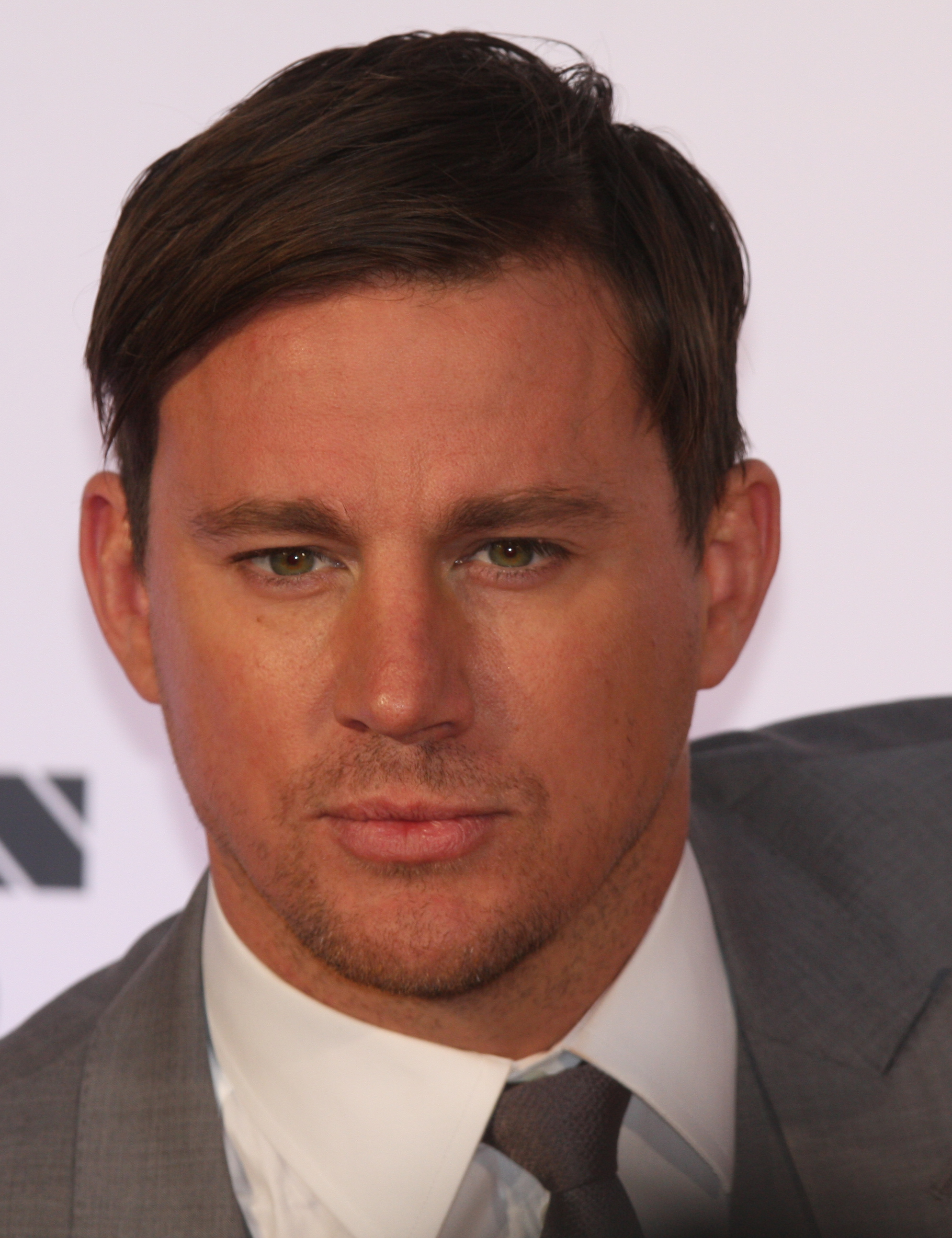
Tatum at the 2015 Warner Bros. & Hoyts red carpet arena premiere of Magic Mike XXL

Tatum appeared in Steven Soderbergh's Side Effects, with Rooney Mara and Jude Law. He reprised his role as Conrad S. Hauser / Duke in G.I. Joe: Retaliation, the sequel to 2009's G.I. Joe: The Rise of Cobra, in an ensemble cast that included Dwayne Johnson and Bruce Willis. Originally scheduled for release on June 29, 2012, the film was pushed back to March 2013 to convert it to 3D and to add more scenes for his character, who was killed at the beginning of the film. Tatum later said he had not wanted to appear in the sequel and was happy his character had been killed off. Also in 2013, he appeared in another action film, White House Down.

Tatum reprised his role from 21 Jump Street in its sequel, 22 Jump Street, which was released on June 13, 2014. Also in 2014, he co-starred with Steve Carell in Foxcatcher, the story of John du Pont, who had schizophrenia and killed Olympic wrestler Dave Schultz, the brother of the character played by Tatum, who also had won Olympic gold. In 2015, Tatum starred in Magic Mike XXL, reprising his 2012 role.

=== 2020s ===
Tatum was set to star as X-Men character Remy LeBeau / Gambit in a solo film, set within the X-Men film universe, which he would have produced, but the film was cancelled in May 2019 after languishing in development hell since 2014. Tatum eventually appeared as Gambit in the Marvel Cinematic Universe film Deadpool & Wolverine (2024). He is set to reprise this role in Avengers: Doomsday (2026). In 2022, Tatum made his directing debut on Dog, a road-trip comedy tracking a former Army Ranger and his dog that he starred in and co-helmed with regular collaborator Reid Carolin. The same year, he starred opposite Sandra Bullock in the Paramount Pictures romantic action adventure film The Lost City.

In 2023, Tatum returned as Mike Lane in Magic Mike's Last Dance with Steven Soderbergh as director. The film was set for an exclusive premiere on HBO Max, but it was instead released in theaters on February 10, 2023.

Tatum starred in Zoë Kravitz's directorial debut film Blink Twice (2024), portraying a tech billionaire.

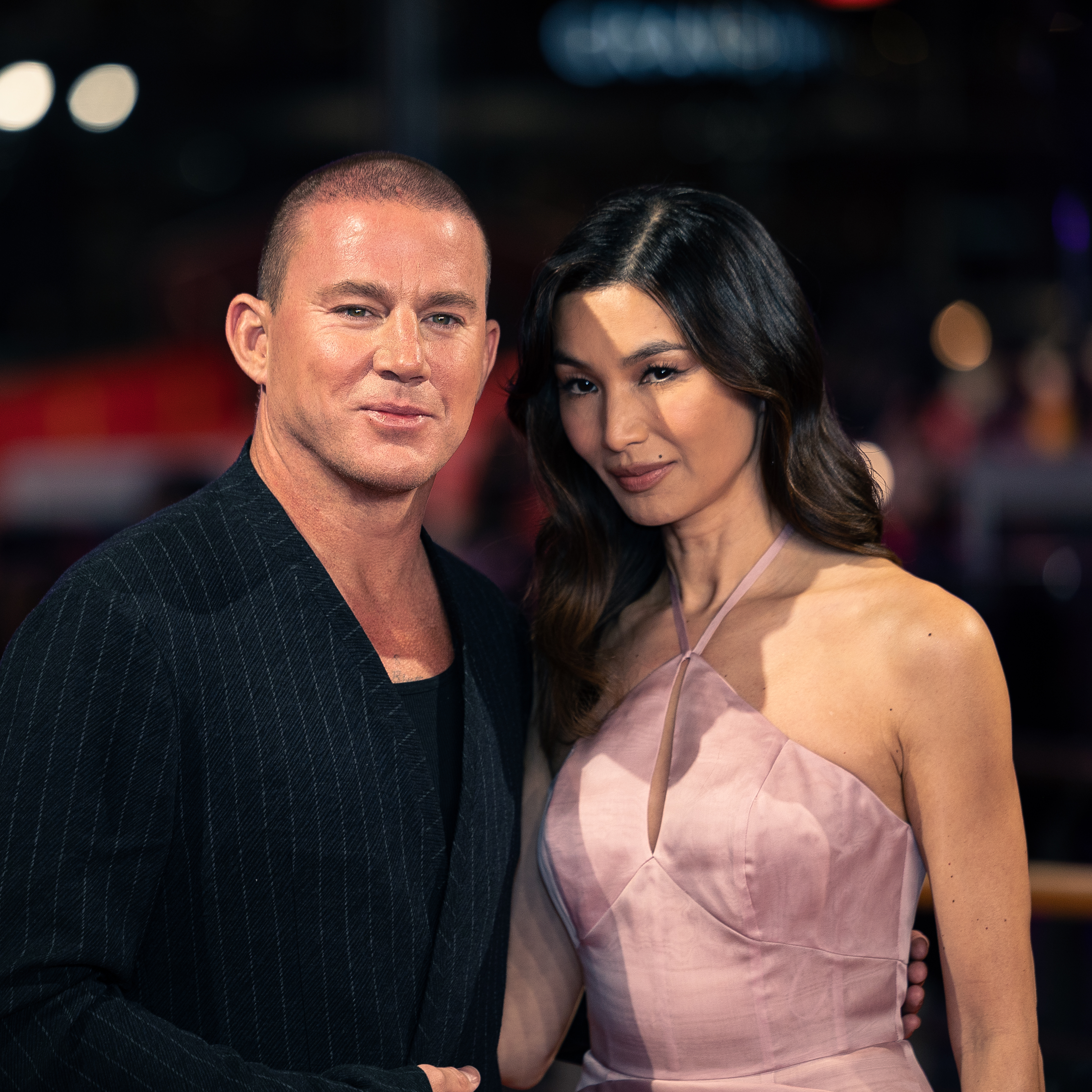
Tatum and Gemma Chan at the 2026 Berlin International Film Festival

Tatum's performance as a conman with a heart-of-gold in the 2025 film Roofman garnered him the "best reviews of his career" according to The Hollywood Reporter.

== Other ventures ==
=== Business ===
In October 2012, Tatum and a friend opened the Saints and Sinners burlesque-themed restaurant and bar in New Orleans, which remained open until 2024.

=== Production companies ===
In an interview with Details magazine, published in early 2012, Tatum said he wants to produce all the films he stars in, "I really don't want to be in any more movies that I don't produce. Unless it's with one of the 10 directors that I really want to work with, I don't have any interest in not being on the ground floor of creating it." He, his then-wife Jenna Dewan, and their production partner Reid Carolin signed a two-year production deal in 2010 with Relativity Media for any films they may develop during that time.

Tatum started two production companies, 33andOut Productions and Iron Horse Entertainment. Their first production was the 2010 documentary Earth Made of Glass. In 2021, another one of his production companies, Free Association, signed a first look deal with MGM.

=== Writing ===
Tatum has written two picture books inspired by his daughter. The first, The One and Only Sparkella (2021), was a #1 New York Times bestseller for children's picture books the week it published. The One and Only Sparkella Makes a Plan was published in 2022.

== Influence ==
Tatum was named People's "Sexiest Man Alive" in 2012 and one of Time's 100 most influential people in the world in 2022.

== Personal life ==
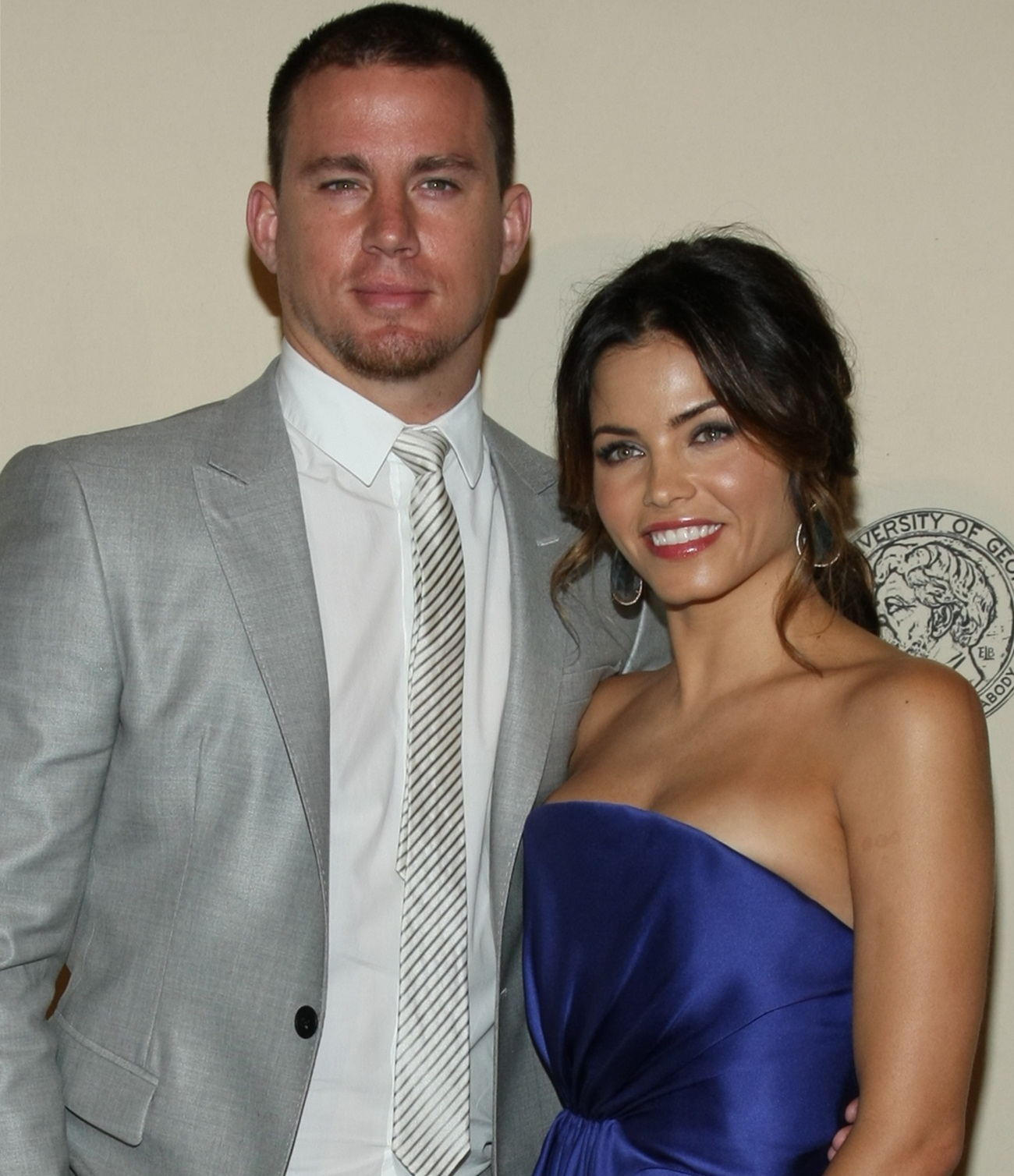
Tatum and then-wife Jenna Dewan at the Peabody Awards 2012

In 2006, Tatum met actress Jenna Dewan on the set of their film Step Up, and they married on July 11, 2009, in Malibu, California. They have one daughter, born in 2013. On April 2, 2018, the couple announced they were separating. Six months later, Dewan filed for divorce from Tatum. The divorce was finalized in November 2019. In a 2023 interview with Vanity Fair, Tatum questioned whether he would ever remarry, though said his divorce prompted self-improvement, including a strong relationship with his daughter.

Tatum dated English singer Jessie J from 2018 to 2020. In 2021, Tatum started dating Zoë Kravitz and, by 2023, the couple were engaged. The engagement was called off in October 2024. In April 2025, it was confirmed that Tatum is in a relationship with model Inka Williams.

In February 2026, Tatum suffered a severe shoulder injury that resulted in surgery and him having to drop-out of a film titled Kockroach.

Tatum is a fan of anime, and has said that he and his daughter, Everly, enjoy watching Demon Slayer and Black Clover.

== Filmography ==
Key
†	Denotes works that have not yet been released

=== Film ===
Year	Title	Role	Notes	Ref.
2005	Coach Carter	Jason Lyle		
2005	Havoc	Nick		
2005	Supercross	Rowdy Sparks		
2005	War of the Worlds	Boy in church	Uncredited role	
2006	She's the Man	Duke Orsino		
2006	Step Up	Tyler Gage		
2006	A Guide to Recognizing Your Saints	Young Antonio		
2007	The Trap	Greg	Short film	
2007	Battle in Seattle	Johnson		
2008	Step Up 2: The Streets	Tyler Gage	Cameo appearance	
2008	Stop-Loss	Steve Shriver		
2009	Fighting	Shawn MacArthur		
2009	Public Enemies	Pretty Boy Floyd		
2009	G.I. Joe: The Rise of Cobra	Conrad S. Hauser / Duke		
2010	Dear John	John Tyree		
2011	The Dilemma	Zip		
2011	The Son of No One	Jonathan "Milk" White		
2011	The Eagle	Marcus Flavius Aquila		
2011	10 Years	Jake Bills	Also producer	
2011	Haywire	Aaron		
2012	The Vow	Leo Collins		
2012	21 Jump Street	Greg Jenko	Also executive producer	
2012	Magic Mike	Michael "Magic Mike" Lane	Also producer	
2013	Side Effects	Martin Taylor		
2013	G.I. Joe: Retaliation	Conrad S. Hauser / Duke		
2013	This Is the End	Himself	Cameo appearance	
2013	White House Down	John Cale	Also executive producer	
2013	Don Jon	Connor Verreaux	Cameo appearance	
2014	The Lego Movie	Superman / Clark Kent	Voice role	
2014	Foxcatcher	Mark Schultz		
2014	22 Jump Street	Greg Jenko	Also producer	
2014	The Book of Life	Joaquin Mondragon Jr.	Voice role	
2015	Jupiter Ascending	Caine Wise		
2015	Magic Mike XXL	Michael "Magic Mike" Lane	Also producer	
2015	The Hateful Eight	Jody Domergue		
2016	Hail, Caesar!	Burt Gurney		
2017	The Lego Batman Movie	Superman / Clark Kent	Voice role	
2017	Dark Hoser	Superman / Clark Kent	Voice role; short film	
2017	Logan Lucky	Jimmy Logan	Also producer	
2017	Kingsman: The Golden Circle	Agent Tequila		
2018	Smallfoot	Migo	Voice role	
2019	The Lego Movie 2: The Second Part	Superman / Clark Kent	Voice role	
2021	America: The Motion Picture	George Washington	Voice role; also producer	
2021	Free Guy	Revenjamin Buttons	Cameo appearance	
2022	Dog	Army Ranger Jackson Briggs	Also director and producer	
2022	The Lost City	Alan Caprison / Dash McMahon		
2022	Bullet Train	Train Passenger	Uncredited cameo appearance	
2023	Magic Mike's Last Dance	Michael "Magic Mike" Lane		
2024	Fly Me to the Moon	Cole Davis		
2024	Deadpool & Wolverine	Remy LeBeau / Gambit		
2024	Blink Twice	Slater King	Also producer	
2025	Atropia	The Actor	Uncredited cameo appearance	
2025	Demon Slayer: Kimetsu no Yaiba – The Movie: Infinity Castle	Keizo	Voice role (English dub)	
2025	Roofman	Jeffrey Manchester		
2026	Josephine	Damien		
2026	Avengers: Doomsday †	Remy LeBeau / Gambit (Earth-10005)	Post-production	
2027	Isle of Man †		Filming	

=== Television ===
Year	Title	Role	Notes	Ref.
2004	CSI: Miami	Bob Davenport	Episode: "Pro Per"	
2012	Saturday Night Live	Himself (host)	Episode: "Channing Tatum/Bon Iver"	
2014	The Simpsons	Movie Homer Simpson	Voice role; Episode: "Steal This Episode"	
2016	Lip Sync Battle	Himself	Episode: "Channing Tatum vs. Jenna Dewan-Tatum"	
2017	Comrade Detective	Gregor Anghel	Voice role; 6 episodes (also executive producer)	
2022	The Afterparty	Himself / "Young John Oates"	2 episodes	

=== Producer ===
Year	Title	Role	Notes
2010	Earth Made of Glass	Executive producer	Documentary
2018–2022	Step Up	Executive producer	Television series
2018	6 Balloons	Producer	Feature film
2021	Fatherhood	Executive producer	Feature film
2021–2022	Finding Magic Mike	Executive producer	Television series
2024	Spaceman	Producer	Feature film

=== Music videos ===
Year	Title	Artist	Notes
2000	"She Bangs"	Ricky Martin	
2006	"(When You Gonna) Give It Up to Me"	Sean Paul featuring Keyshia Cole	
2006	"Get Up"	Ciara featuring Chamillionaire	
2013	"(I Wanna) Channing All Over Your Tatum"	Jamie Foxx and Channing Tatum featuring Jimmy Kimmel	
2017	"Beautiful Trauma"	Pink	
