= Magic Mike XXL =

2015 film by Gregory Jacobs

- Theatrical release poster
- Directed by: Gregory Jacobs
- Written by: Reid Carolin
- Produced by: Nick Wechsler; Gregory Jacobs; Channing Tatum; Reid Carolin
- Starring: Channing Tatum; Matt Bomer; Joe Manganiello; Kevin Nash; Adam Rodríguez; Gabriel Iglesias; Amber Heard; Donald Glover; Andie MacDowell; Elizabeth Banks; Jada Pinkett Smith
- Cinematography: Peter Andrews
- Edited by: Mary Ann Bernard
- Production companies: Iron Horse Entertainment; RatPac-Dune Entertainment
- Distributed by: Warner Bros. Pictures
- Release dates: June 25, 2015 (Los Angeles); July 1, 2015 (United States)
- Running time: 115 minutes
- Country: United States
- Language: English
- Budget: $14.8 million
- Box office: $117.8 million

Magic Mike XXL is a 2015 American comedy-drama film directed by Gregory Jacobs, written by Reid Carolin and starring Channing Tatum, Matt Bomer, Kevin Nash, and Joe Manganiello. A sequel to 2012's Magic Mike, the film premiered in Hollywood on June 26, 2015, and was released theatrically in the United States on July 1, 2015, by Warner Bros. Pictures. It received lukewarm reviews from critics and grossed $117.8 million worldwide. A third film, Magic Mike's Last Dance, was released in February 2023.

== Plot ==
Three years after quitting male stripping, Mike has his own furniture business. He receives a call from Tarzan who informs him that Dallas is "gone". Believing that his former boss has died, Mike goes to a hotel to find his friends, the remaining Kings of Tampa, at a pool party.

After revealing Dallas bailed on them to start a new show in Macau and only took "The Kid" (Note: Referencing Adam from Magic Mike (2012)) with him, the Kings let Mike in on their plan: to end their careers on a high note at the male stripping convention in Myrtle Beach, South Carolina. Later, while trying to work, Mike dances to a song he used to strip to. Reinvigorated, he decides to join them on their trip.

Driving in a fro-yo van owned by Tito and Tobias, they make their first stop at Mad Mary's. To prove to Richie he is willing to commit to the trip, Mike participates in an amateur drag queen contest, and the others join him shortly. They then go to a beach where Mike lets Ken hit him to resolve his issues with him. He also meets photographer Zoe, who tells him that she is off to New York. They flirt but agree to not have sex.

Back on the road, Mike suggests that they change their routine after the group (except Tarzan) takes MDMA. At a gas station, he coerces Richie into trying to make the cashier smile with an improvised striptease. This inspires the others to abandon their old routines.

Soon afterwards, Tobias falls asleep at the wheel, crashing the van. He suffers a concussion and needs hospitalization; everyone else is left unscathed. At the hospital, they begin to lose morale and contemplate quitting and heading home. Mike then reveals that his furniture business is not going that well and that he is no longer with Brooke after she rejected his proposal. The group decides to continue on.

In search of a new MC, Mike brings the group to a Savannah, Georgia strip club owned by Rome, a woman Mike has a history with. Despite proving that his skills have not deteriorated, he is unsuccessful in getting her to help them. However, she gets Andre, a rapper/singer who works at the club, to drive them to their next stop.

Arriving at a mansion, Tito tells them he knows the girl who lives there, and she is expecting them. Walking in, they are greeted by her mother Nancy and her friends, all middle-aged women. Nancy's teasing initially makes them feel awkward, but as the night progresses, the mood lightens. Mike meets Zoe again, and she tells him about how another photographer, under the guise of needing an assistant, tried to have an extramarital affair with her. Mike urges her to regain her smile at the convention.

After sleeping with Richie, Nancy lets them drive her ex-husband's car to Myrtle Beach. Upon arrival, they are surprised to see Rome. She had a change of heart, agreeing to be their MC. Andre and Malik also came to help. With preparations complete, they head to the convention where they squeeze in a spot, thanks to Rome and her history with Paris, the organizer of the event.

The group's performance is a success. During Mike and Malik's number, Mike brings Zoe on stage. Tobias returns with the fro-yo van as everyone celebrates and watches the Fourth of July fireworks.

== Cast ==
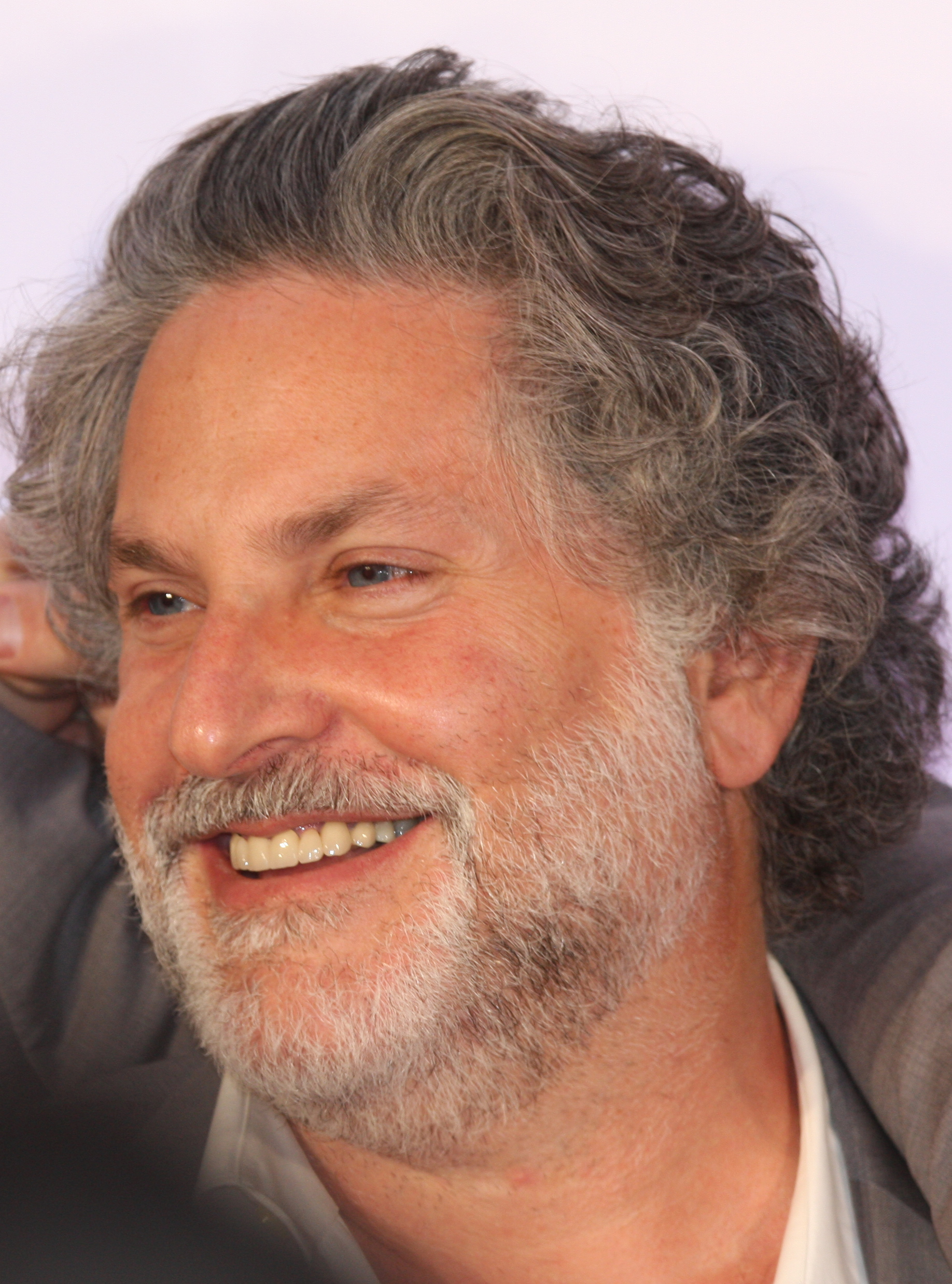
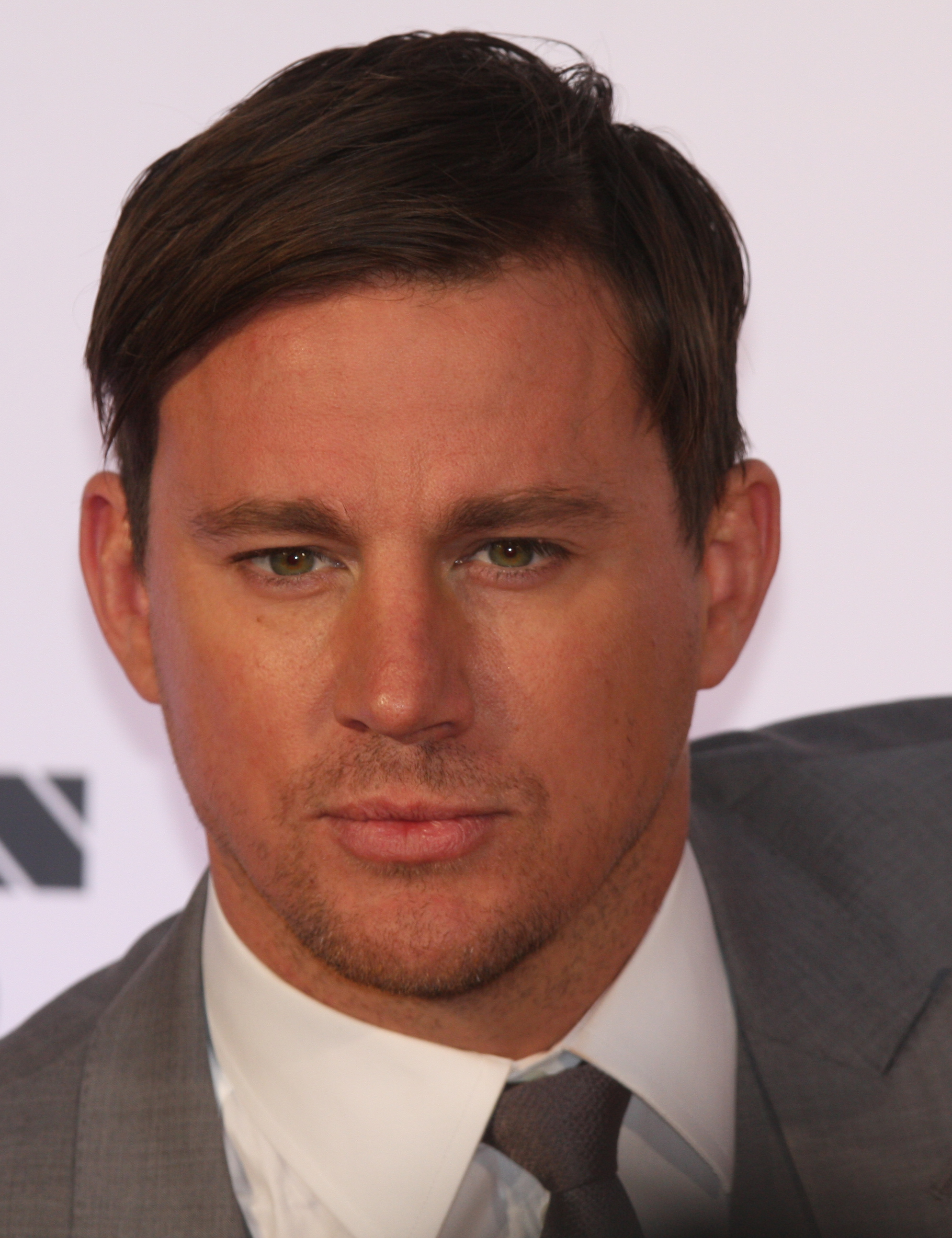
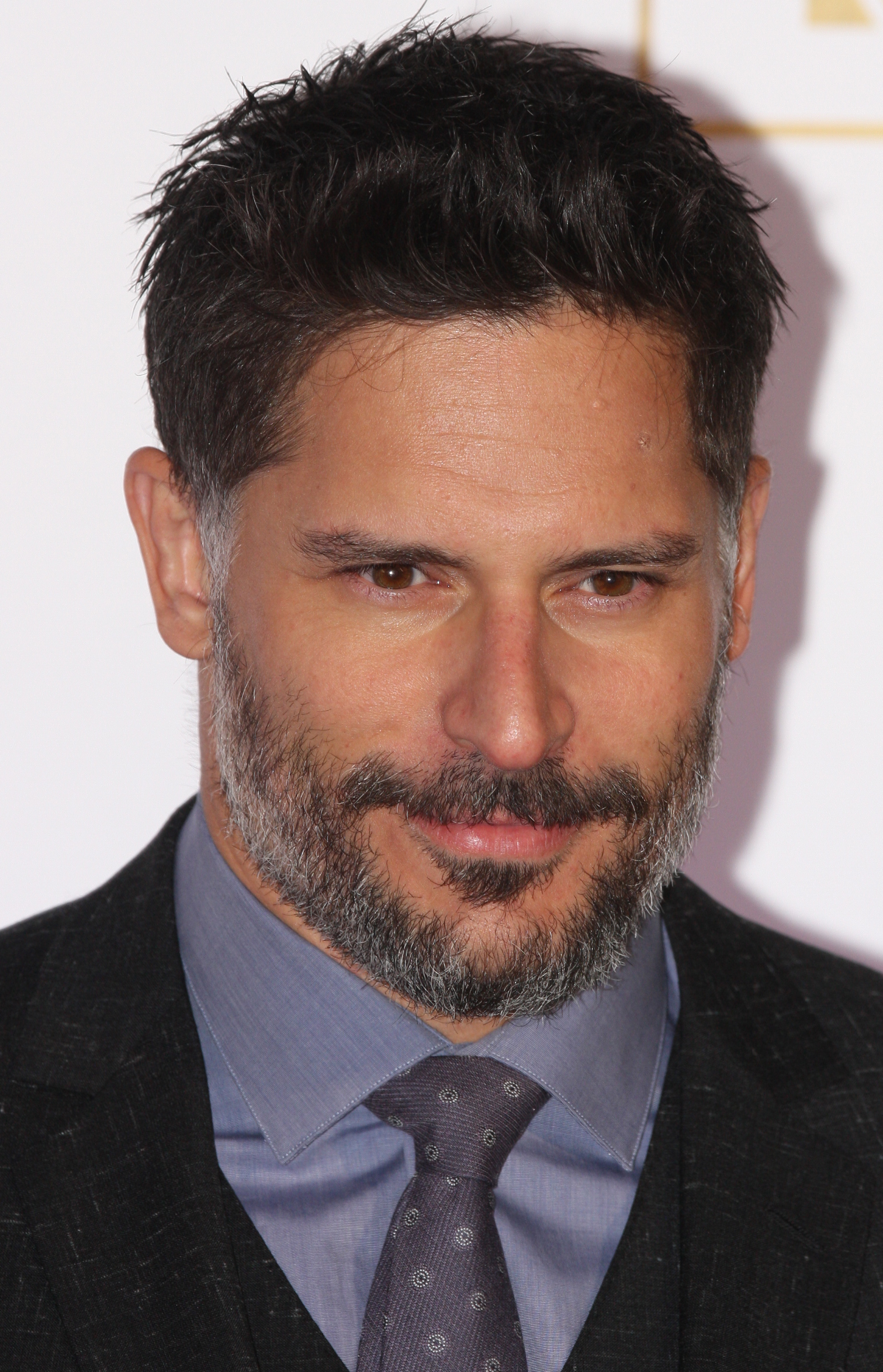
Gregory Jacobs (top), Channing Tatum (middle) and Joe Manganiello (bottom) at the premiere of Magic Mike XXL in Sydney, Australia
- Channing Tatum as Michael "Magic Mike" Lane
- Matt Bomer as Ken
- Joe Manganiello as Big Dick Richie
- Kevin Nash as Tarzan/Ernest
- Adam Rodríguez as Tito
- Gabriel Iglesias as Tobias
- Amber Heard as Zoe
- Donald Glover as Andre
- Stephen "tWitch" Boss as Malik
- Michael Strahan as Augustus
- Andie MacDowell as Nancy Davidson
- Elizabeth Banks as Paris
- Jada Pinkett Smith as Rome
- Vicky Vox as Tori Snatch
- Carrie Anne Hunt as Megan Davidson
- Crystal Hunt as Lauren
- Jane McNeil as Mae
- Rhoda Griffis as Julia
- Ann Hamilton as Diane
- Mary Kraft as Jessica
- Deidre Goodwin as Tarzan's girl

== Production ==
=== Development ===
In a Twitter Q&A in July 2012, Tatum confirmed work on a sequel. The actor responded: "Yes, yes and yes! We're working on the concept now. We want to flip the script and make it bigger." By March 2014, Magic Mike first assistant director Gregory Jacobs had been chosen to direct the sequel, titled Magic Mike XXL and scheduled to begin shooting by the end of 2014. Steven Soderbergh, the original film's director, acted as editor and cinematographer under pseudonyms. The film was released on schedule on July 1, 2015.

=== Casting ===
On September 17, 2014, it was officially announced by director Jacobs during an interview with IndieWire that Matthew McConaughey would not be returning for the film. Alex Pettyfer and Cody Horn were also confirmed as not returning. On September 18, 2014, Jada Pinkett Smith was in talks to join the cast. On September 22, 2014, Smith was confirmed to play a role originally written for a male actor. On September 29, 2014, as production began in Savannah, Greg Silverman announced the official cast and plot of the film, returning cast includes Tatum, Bomer, Manganiello, Nash, Adam Rodríguez and Gabriel Iglesias, while new cast members include Elizabeth Banks, Donald Glover, Amber Heard, Andie MacDowell, Smith and Michael Strahan. On October 8, 2014, Stephen "tWitch" Boss announced his involvement in the film, saying that he was asked by Tatum to join the cast. Actor and former bodybuilder Christian Boeving filmed his scenes for the film, but they were edited out during the post-production process.

=== Filming ===
On August 31, 2014, filming took place in Myrtle Beach, South Carolina, including 2nd Avenue Pier, Pier 14, Plyler Park, Myrtle Beach SkyWheel and Myrtle Beach Aviation located in the former Myrtle Beach Air Force Base. On September 29, filming began on location in Savannah, Georgia, where the shoot took place at the Savannah Gentleman's Club, some photos from the set were also shared by actors. On September 30, the shooting took place on Tybee Island. Filming took place October 23–25 in Savannah, Georgia, where more than 900 women extras were used, 300–900 each day for Convention scenes. Filming officially wrapped on November 5, 2014, with a final sequence filmed on the Myrtle Beach Boardwalk, South Carolina.

== Soundtrack ==
The soundtrack of the film consists of R&B and hip hop songs that the men dance to, including "Pony" by Ginuwine, which was also included in the first film. The album was released in the United States on June 30, 2015, by WaterTower Music. Included in the film and on the album are Bomer's covers of "Untitled (How Does It Feel)" by D'Angelo and "Heaven" by Bryan Adams. As well as acting in the film, Donald Glover also features on the soundtrack where he covers "Marry You", originally by Bruno Mars. The album also contains "I Want It That Way" by the Backstreet Boys (which serves as the music for an impromptu public routine by Manganiello).

Charts

Chart (2015)	Peak position
Australian Albums (ARIA)	10
Belgian Albums (Ultratop Flanders)	75
Belgian Albums (Ultratop Wallonia)	136
New Zealand Albums (RMNZ)	32
US Billboard 200	8
US Soundtrack Albums (Billboard)	1

== Reception ==
=== Box office ===
Magic Mike XXL grossed $66 million in North America and $51.8 million in other territories for a worldwide total of $117.8 million, against a budget of $14.8 million.

The film was released alongside Terminator Genisys, and along with holdovers Jurassic World and Inside Out, each was projected to earn $27–30 million over the three-day weekend and $45–55 million during the five-day Independence Day stretch. It made $2.4 million from Tuesday night showings (higher than the $2.1 million earned by its predecessor's preview screenings) and $9.3 million on its opening day (Wednesday) – including Tuesday showings. In its opening weekend, the film grossed $12.8 million ($27.9 million for the five-day total), coming in below expectations and finishing 4th at the box office behind Inside Out ($29.7 million), Jurassic World ($29.2 million) and Terminator Genisys ($27 million).

=== Critical response ===
On Rotten Tomatoes, the film holds an approval rating of 66% based on 238 reviews, with an average rating of 6/10. The website's critics consensus reads, "Magic Mike XXL has enough narrative thrust and beefy charm to deliver another helping of well-oiled entertainment, even if this sequel isn't quite as pleasurable as its predecessor." On Metacritic, the film has a score of 60 out of 100, based on 41 critics, indicating "mixed or average reviews". In CinemaScore polls, cinema audiences gave the film an average grade of "A−" on an A+ to F scale.

In 2026, IndieWire rated Magic Mike XXL as the best movie sequel ever made.

=== Accolades ===
Award	Category	Recipient	Result	Ref.
Teen Choice Awards	Choice Summer Movie Star: Male	Channing Tatum	Nominated	

== Sequel ==
A sequel, Magic Mike's Last Dance, was announced on November 29, 2021. In 2022, it was reported that Steven Soderbergh would return after having directed the first film. Thandiwe Newton was initially cast in an unspecified role but was replaced by Salma Hayek in April 2022. In July 2022, Soderbergh announced that there are developments ongoing for additional installments in the franchise for stories centered around other characters unrelated to Mike Lane. The film was originally produced for streaming release on HBO Max, but in September 2022, it was announced that the film would instead be released theatrically, on February 10, 2023.
