= Magic Mike =

2012 film by Steven Soderbergh

- Theatrical release poster
- Directed by: Steven Soderbergh
- Written by: Reid Carolin
- Produced by: Nick Wechsler; Gregory Jacobs; Channing Tatum; Reid Carolin
- Starring: Channing Tatum; Alex Pettyfer; Matthew McConaughey; Cody Horn; Olivia Munn; Matt Bomer; Riley Keough; Joe Manganiello; Kevin Nash; Adam Rodriguez; Gabriel Iglesias
- Cinematography: Peter Andrews
- Edited by: Mary Ann Bernard
- Production companies: Nick Wechsler Productions; Iron Horse Entertainment; Extension 765
- Distributed by: Warner Bros. Pictures (United States and Canada); FilmNation Entertainment (international)
- Release dates: June 24, 2012 (Los Angeles Film Festival); June 29, 2012 (United States)
- Running time: 110 minutes
- Country: United States
- Language: English
- Budget: $7 million
- Box office: $167.2 million

Magic Mike is a 2012 American independent comedy-drama film directed by Steven Soderbergh and starring Channing Tatum, Alex Pettyfer, Matt Bomer, Joe Manganiello, and Matthew McConaughey. The plot revolves around Adam, a 19-year-old college dropout who enters the world of male stripping, guided by Mike Lane, who has been in the business for six years.

The film is loosely based on the experiences of Tatum, who was an 18-year-old male stripper in Tampa, Florida. Magic Mike was filmed in several locations around west central Florida. The film premiered as the closing film for the 2012 Los Angeles Film Festival on June 24, 2012, and was widely released by Warner Bros. Pictures on June 29, 2012, and was a critical and commercial success.

A sequel, Magic Mike XXL directed by Gregory Jacobs, was released on July 1, 2015. A third and final film, Magic Mike's Last Dance, was released on February 10, 2023, with Soderbergh returning to direct.

== Plot ==
Mike Lane has big plans for a business of his own but pays his bills through a series of odd jobs, most notably performing as the star performer at the Xquisite Strip Club in Tampa. It is owned by Dallas, who has dreams of creating an "empire" of male strip clubs.

Mike soon meets 19-year-old Adam, a recent college dropout looking for a construction job. He takes him under his wing and encourages him to begin stripping at Xquisite. Mike is introduced to Adam's sister Brooke. Despite his on-and-off relationship with Joanna, Mike finds himself attracted to Brooke and promises to look after Adam.

Adam falls further into the excessive lifestyle of the Xquisite dancers, using drugs and having sexual encounters with many clients. When Dallas announces he has a plan to move their act to Miami, Mike confides in Brooke that he is tired of the lifestyle and wants to get a small business loan to pursue his dream of opening a custom furniture business.

The bank declines his loan application and Mike realizes that he has to stay in the business to continue to pay his bills. He later attends a hurricane party at Dallas' house, where Adam becomes part of a scheme created by Tobias, Xquisite's DJ, to sell drugs to Xquisite's clients, and is eventually given a package of ecstasy. Adam begins using drugs regularly, and Mike notices more of Adam's reckless behavior, to the chagrin of Brooke, who is relying on Mike to protect him.

A few days later, Mike and Adam perform for a private party at a sorority house where Adam brings the package of drugs with him. There, Adam gives a young woman an ecstasy pill, causing a brawl between him and the woman's boyfriend. The performers are forced to flee without the drugs, which Adam says were worth $1,000. They also do not collect their payment, which infuriates Dallas.

After the next night's show, Mike and Adam take drugs and go to a club. Adam vomits and passes out; Brooke finds him on Mike's floor the next morning. Brooke angrily confronts Mike about his lifestyle, and ends her friendship with him. Tobias and his suppliers break into Mike's house looking for Adam, revealing that the drugs were actually worth $10,000. Mike gives up most of his life savings to pay Adam's debt in full, but Adam acts ignorant of the close encounter afterwards, quietly angering Mike.

Later, before the dancers' final performance at Xquisite, Mike decides he has had enough. Knowing that Dallas has no loyalty to any of them and is driven by greed, Mike leaves the club through the back. After realizing Mike is not coming back, Dallas promotes Adam to replace him as lead dancer.

Mike drives to Brooke's apartment and tells her he has quit stripping. Brooke has learned what he did for Adam, and she invites him to join her for breakfast. She playfully asks what they can do until morning, and then kisses him.

== Cast ==
- Channing Tatum as Michael "Magic Mike" Lane, a male stripper who performs at Xquisite.
- Alex Pettyfer as Adam "The Kid", Mike's protege who befriends him.
- Cody Horn as Brooke, Adam's sister and Mike's love interest
- Olivia Munn as Joanna, Mike's on-again, off-again lover.
- Matthew McConaughey as Dallas, a former stripper who owns Xquisite and is Mike's boss.
- Joe Manganiello as Big Dick Richie
- Matt Bomer as Ken
- Adam Rodriguez as Tito
- Kevin Nash as Tarzan
- Gabriel Iglesias as Tobias
- Mircea Monroe as Mercedes
- Camryn Grimes as Birthday Girl
- Riley Keough as Nora
- Wendi McLendon-Covey as Tara
- Martin Villeneuve as Marty Boy
- Michael Roark as Ryan
- Reid Carolin as Paul
- Betsy Brandt as Banker
- Caitlin Gerard as Kim

== Production ==
=== Development ===
Magic Mike is directed by Steven Soderbergh based on a screenplay by Reid Carolin, who is also one of the film's producers. The screenplay is in part inspired by Channing Tatum's experiences as a male stripper in Tampa, Florida, when he was 18 years old. Tatum said that he wanted to capture the atmosphere and energy of his past as a male stripper, but that the film is fictional, which allowed them to create their own scenarios. The project, announced in April 2011 was co-financed by Soderbergh and Tatum. Soderbergh was hired to direct after getting fired from Moneyball. In 2010, Tatum told an Australian newspaper that he would like to make a movie about his experiences as a male stripper, saying: "I've already got the director picked out. I'd like Nicolas Refn, who did the film Bronson, to do it because he's insane for it." Refn initially agreed on doing the film because he and Tatum were going to do another movie together. However, since that project did not get off the ground and due to his busy schedule, Tatum, who was then working with Soderbergh on Haywire, brought him the idea. After Soderbergh cast Tatum and Pettyfer in the lead roles, Carolin spent time revising the screenplay. He wrote the first draft in a month. Soderbergh suggested showing two points of view in the film: seeing through the eyes of young Adam and of his mentor Mike.

The dance numbers were choreographed by Alison Faulk, while Christopher Peterson was in charge of the costume design and Frankie Pine supervised the music. Over the film, several dance numbers were performed. Music producer Jack Rayner created a special dubstep version of the song "It's Raining Men" sung by Countré Black for the dance sequence that features the ensemble for the first time together without The Kid. For that sequence, Peterson chose to use spray glitter on the umbrellas and raincoats to give them a wet effect. The Kid's first strip did not purposely have any choreography and it was Pettyfer's idea to show his bottom. Before doing his moves, Pettyfer did not know the song that was going to be played which ended up being Madonna's "Like a Virgin" performed by Nashville recording artist Chris Mitchell. The five-stripper group performed the song "Sound Off (The Duckworth Chant)" with lyric changes on the military-themed number. The scene during which Mike and Adam arrive at a sorority house dressed as cops was not in the original script but was Peterson's idea. Music supervisor Pine initially planned to use Kid Rock's "Cowboy" for the cowboy-themed number featuring The Kid. When it was not possible, she chose Big & Rich's "Save a Horse (Ride a Cowboy)" instead. Knowing Tatum's dance skills, Faulk gave him the permission to freestyle for Mike's last solo dance on the dubstep song "Calypso" by Excision and Datsik. McConaughey, who had no stripping scene in the original script, requested to have one, which became the last dance number, during which he first sings "Ladies of Tampa", and then strips. The song was written in three hours by music supervisor Frankie Pine, Matthew McConaughey and Martin Blasick, McConaughey's guitar coach. The thongs were made by company Pistol Pete.

=== Casting ===
On August 16, 2011, it was reported that Matthew McConaughey had landed a role in the film. He was the first person cast, aside from Tatum. McConaughey revealed that Soderbergh called him to offer him the role of Dallas. After Soderbergh pitched him the story, McConaughey laughed and in 10 minutes he accepted the role. It was the second time he accepted a role over the phone; the first time was for a Richard Linklater film. Commenting on the role, the actor said: "I knew that I was just going to be able to fly. It was really fun to play someone so committed, in many ways." Joe Manganiello accepted the role of Big Dick Richie after talking to What to Expect When You're Expecting co-star Chris Rock, who convinced him to do it. Cody Horn gave her insight on how she got the part of Brooke:

They weren't going to see me because they thought I was too young, but my agent, Jason, fought for me to go in. Carmen Cuba, the casting director, agreed to meet with me, and we taped the interview. She asked me questions about my life, my dating history, things like that. We talked like girlfriends would; it was more friendly than a formal interview. I then got a call that I was to go in and audition for them, which I did. After we finished the scenes, Carmen excused the guy I was reading with and said, "this will never happen to you again for the rest of your career, but you booked the role before you came in."

The cast visited a male strip club to see what the world of male stripping was like and to get information on the backstage life. To prepare for the role, McConaughey went to a Los Angeles strip mall to get used to regular waxing. Matt Bomer had to put on about 15 pounds for his part. Adam Rodriguez went through a cardio and weights training.

=== Filming ===
Principal photography commenced in Playa del Rey, Los Angeles in September 2011 and concluded in Tampa by late October. The scenes that took place in the fictional club Xquisite were filmed in Studio City, Los Angeles. Locations in Florida included the Fort Desoto Bridge, the Dunedin coast, the Gulf of Mexico, Tampa, Ybor City, St. Petersburg, Tarpon Springs, and Tierra Verde. Soderbergh chose to shoot the entirety of the film with a double straw camera filter, except the interior of the club.

=== Music ===
Magic Mike: Original Motion Picture Soundtrack

Soundtrack album by Various artists
- Released: June 26, 2012
- Length: 36:18
- Label: WaterTower Music

The soundtrack was released on June 28, 2012, through WaterTower Music. Other songs featured in the film include Cobra Starship's "#1Nite", Sean Paul's "Got 2 Luv U", and Ginuwine's "Pony".

Track listing

No.	Title	Performer(s)	Length
1.	"Breakdown"	Alice Russell	3:45
2.	"It's Raining Men"	Countré Black	1:57
3.	"Bang Bang Boom"	The Unknown	1:58
4.	"Gimme What You Got"	Black Daniel	3:13
5.	"Just For Now"	Cloud Control	3:57
6.	"Money"	Ringside	2:54
7.	"Sassy Sexy Wiggle"	Joe Tex	4:02
8.	"Mo Cash!"	Vegas Audio Ninjas	2:08
9.	"Wash U Clean"	Beth Thornley	3:13
10.	"Victim"	Win Win & Blaqstarr	3:37
11.	"Ladies of Tampa"	Matthew McConaughey	1:14
12.	"Feels Like the First Time"	Foreigner	4:20

== Release ==
Warner Bros. Pictures acquired U.S. and Canadian distribution rights to the independently produced film on October 27, 2011. Magic Mike was first screened at the Los Angeles Film Festival as the closing film on June 24, 2012, and was widely released on June 29, 2012, in the United States.

=== Marketing ===
The first full-length trailer for Magic Mike was released on iTunes on April 18, 2012, with a poster indicating the film's name. The first poster featuring the cast was released on June 1, 2012, along with a new trailer. A second poster followed on June 4, 2012, and a fourth trailer was released on June 13, 2012. To promote the film, Channing Tatum, Matthew McConaughey, Joe Manganiello and Matt Bomer participated in a photo shoot for Entertainment Weekly that came out in the May 25, 2012, issue. On June 3, 2012, Tatum, McConaughey, and Manganiello attended the MTV Movie Awards where they presented the award for Best On-Screen Transformation. During the presentation, Manganiello arrived dressed as a fireman stripper.

The promotional campaign, which originally centered on straight women, also targeted gay men, after it had been made clear that there was a strong interest among them. Warner Bros. enlisted entertainment marketing agency the Kartel Group to market the film to gay men. Website AfterElton.com noted that gay men could not connect with the first trailer, as the film "was marketed as a romantic comedy" through Tatum and Horn's relationship, but that it changed when the campaign also focused on "the male form part of it [the film]" through a red-band trailer (the fourth one). In June 2012, a Magic Mike float was included in the West Hollywood gay pride parade and in other gay pride events such as in New York and in San Francisco.

=== Home media ===
Magic Mike was released on DVD and Blu-ray on October 23, 2012. Within its first week, 698,497 DVD units were sold, generating revenue of $10,449,515. As of December 23, 2012, DVD sales totaled over 1.9 million units with $26,362,047 in revenue.

== Reception ==
=== Box office ===
Magic Mike proved to be a box office hit, grossing $113,721,571 and $53,500,000 outside North America with a total gross of $167,221,571 worldwide from a modest $7 million budget; it is the top-grossing movie under the Dance genre. On its opening day (June 29, 2012), the film performed better than expected, earning about $19 million including a $2 million midnight run. It finished the weekend at the second spot behind Ted with a total of $39,127,170. It was the first time two R-rated films grossed more than $21 million each during a weekend.

On its opening weekend, Magic Mike attracted an audience of 73% females, with 43% of the audience being over the age of 35. Dan Fellman, Warner Bros. Pictures President of Domestic Distribution, said this phenomenon could be compared to Sex and the City, which had also appealed to large groups of women.

Magic Mike was more successful in red states than in blue ones. Ticket sales in St. Louis and Nashville was more than 30% over the average. However ticket sales in New York City was 30% below the average.

=== Critical response ===
On Rotten Tomatoes, the film has an approval rating of 78% based on 215 reviews. The site's critical consensus reads: "Magic Mike's sensitive direction, smart screenplay, and strong performances allows audiences to have their beefcake and eat it too." On Metacritic, which assigns a normalized rating based reviews from mainstream critics, the film has a score of 72 out of 100, based on 38 critics indicating "generally favorable reviews". Audiences polled by CinemaScore gave the film an average grade of "B" on an A+ to F scale.

Roger Ebert of the Chicago Sun-Times gave the film three out of four stars, and wrote: "Selling anyone the right to touch your genital area for a couple of bucks is not a good way to build self-esteem. Steven Soderbergh's Magic Mike makes this argument with a crafty mixture of comedy, romance, melodrama and some remarkably well-staged strip routines involving hunky, good-looking guys." Kofi Outlaw of Screen Rant called the film, "a subtle social commentary on blue-collar struggle and the pitfalls of the American Dream."

The movie also launched Academy Award buzz for Matthew McConaughey as Dallas. However, he was not selected for inclusion among the nominees, which was described as a "snub" by many.

=== Top ten lists ===
Magic Mike was listed by many critics as one of the top ten films of 2012.

- 2nd: Kyle Smith, New York Post
- 4th: Sam Adams, The A.V. Club
- 4th: Peter Knegt, Indiewire
- 5th: Guy Lodge, HitFix
- 5th: David Fear, Time Out New York
- 5th: Drew Taylor, Indiewire
- 6th: Rafer Guzmán, Newsday
- 6th: Melissa Anderson, The Village Voice
- 7th: Katie Walsh, Indiewire
- 7th: Elizabeth Weitzman, Daily News (New York)
- 9th: Gabe Toro, Indiewire
- 10th: Aaron Hills, The Village Voice
- Top 10 (ranked alphabetically): Richard Brody, The New Yorker
- Top 10 (ranked alphabetically): Nick Pinkerton, The Village Voice

=== Accolades ===
List of awards and nominations
Award	Category	Recipient(s)	Result
Broadcast Film Critics Association	Best Supporting Actor	Matthew McConaughey	Nominated
Detroit Film Critics Society	Best Supporting Actor	Matthew McConaughey	Nominated
Houston Film Critics Society	Best Supporting Actor	Matthew McConaughey	Nominated
Independent Spirit Awards	Best Supporting Male	Matthew McConaughey	Won
National Society of Film Critics Awards	Best Supporting Actor	Matthew McConaughey (Also for Bernie)	Won
New York Film Critics Circle Awards	Best Supporting Actor	Matthew McConaughey (Also for Bernie)	Won
People's Choice Awards	Best Dramatic Film	Magic Mike	Nominated
People's Choice Awards	Favorite Movie Actor	Channing Tatum (also for 21 Jump Street and The Vow)	Nominated
People's Choice Awards	Favorite Dramatic Actor	Channing Tatum (also for The Vow)	Nominated
MTV Movie Awards	Best Male Performance	Channing Tatum	Nominated
MTV Movie Awards	Best Shirtless Performance	Channing Tatum	Nominated
MTV Movie Awards	Best Musical Moment	Channing Tatum, Matt Bomer, Joe Manganiello, Kevin Nash and Adam Rodríguez	Nominated

== Sequels ==
In a Twitter Q&A in July 2012, Tatum confirmed work on a sequel: "Yes, yes and yes! We're working on the concept now. We want to flip the script and make it bigger." By March 2014, Magic Mike first assistant director Gregory Jacobs had been chosen to direct the sequel, titled Magic Mike XXL, which began shooting in late 2014. The film was released on July 1, 2015.

A third film, Magic Mike's Last Dance, was announced on November 29, 2021, with Soderbergh returning to direct. The film was released on February 10, 2023.

== Stage musical ==
Reid Carolin, who wrote the film, adapted as a stage musical for Broadway. The adaptation was in development for over seven years. It was confirmed on 3 June 2018 in the UK on Britain's Got Talent live final that a UK version of Magic Mike would be put into production, and would begin in November 2018. Magic Mike Live London opened at the Hippodrome, London in Leicester Square on 10 November 2018. with original cast including Samantha Baines and David Morgan and directed by Channing Tatum.

== TV series ==
A reality competition television series, titled Finding Magic Mike was ordered for HBO Max in April 2021 with Tatum and Soderbergh as executive producers. It premiered on December 16, 2021, produced by Eureka Productions and Warner Bros. Unscripted Television in association with Warner Horizon. The series was later canceled and removed from HBO Max in December 2022. The series was released on The Roku Channel and Tubi on February 1, 2023.

== See also ==
- Australia's Thunder from Down Under
- Dreamboys
- Chippendales
- The Full Monty
