= Earth Made of Glass (film) =

2010 American documentary film by Deborah Scranton

- Directed by: Deborah Scranton
- Written by: Reid Carolin
- Produced by: Deborah Scranton; Reid Carolin
- Cinematography: P.H. O'Brien
- Music by: Johan Söderqvist
- Production companies: Clover and A Bee Films; 33&Out, Inc
- Release date: April 26, 2010 (Tribeca)
- Running time: 88 minutes
- Country: United States
- Languages: English; French; Kinyarwandan

Earth Made of Glass is a 2010 American documentary film, directed by Deborah Scranton, about the 1994 Rwandan Genocide. Filming occurred in Rwanda and France. It premiered at the 2010 Tribeca Film Festival, in the World Documentary Competition, on April 26, 2010.

Earth Made of Glass aired on HBO TV in April 2011, and it was nominated as Best Documentary by the Producers Guild of America. The film won a Peabody Award in 2012.

== Synopsis ==
In 2008, Paul Kagame, as President of Rwanda, had released the findings from an investigation into the massacre which had occurred there in 1994, when fighting began in the Eastern Congo at Rwanda's western border. The influence of French military interference in Rwanda plus the Belgian occupation are explained, in relation to the long-time feud between the Hutus and Tutsis, Rwanda's two main ethnic groups. Meanwhile, survivor Jean-Pierre Sagahutu, whose family had died during the violence, seeks to track down the man who had murdered them. Sagahutu eventually finds the culprit and decides what to do next.

== Reception ==
The public reception to the film was generally positive. The Web site Rotten Tomatoes has not rated the film.

== See also ==
- Kigali, capital city of Rwanda
