= Reid Carolin =

American film producer and director

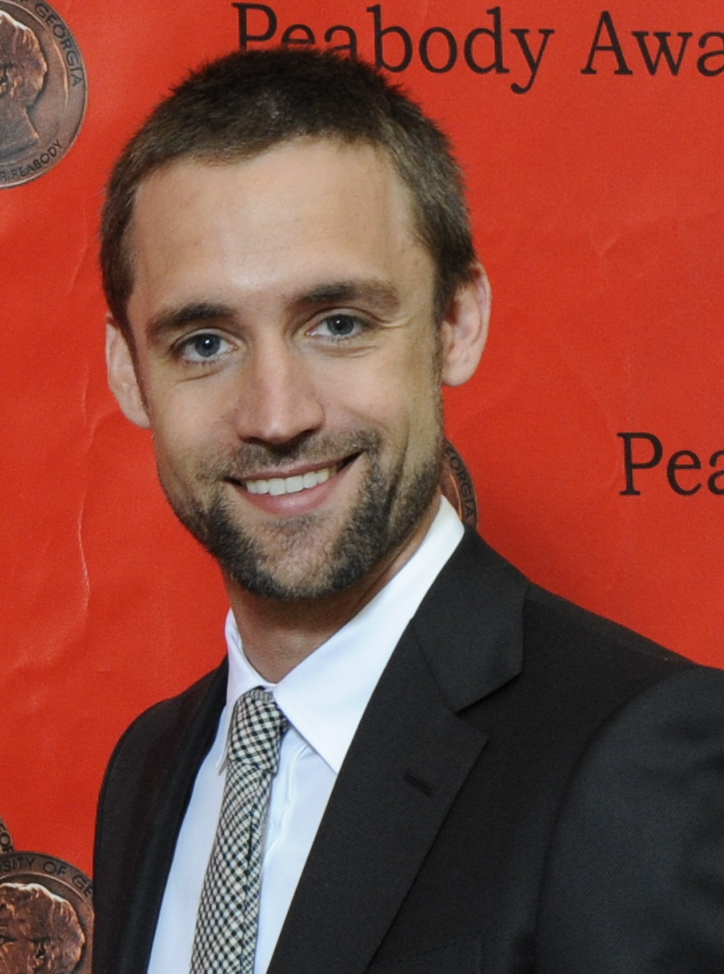
- Carolin at the 2012 Peabody Awards
- Occupations: Film producer, screenwriter
- Spouse: Cody Horn

Reid Carolin is an American film producer, director, and screenwriter. He is primarily known as the producing partner of Channing Tatum.

== Biography ==
Carolin wrote and produced the 2012 film Magic Mike, directed by Steven Soderbergh, and won a 2012 Peabody Award for writing and producing the documentary Earth Made of Glass, which premiered on HBO in April 2011. He was an associate producer and developed the story for the 2008 Paramount Pictures film Stop-Loss and was the cinematographer for the soldier-video sequences in the film. He is also a producer of the films Ten Years, White House Down, and 22 Jump Street. As of the mid-2010s he was scheduled to produce Gambit with producer-star Channing Tatum, and a reboot of Ghostbusters with male leads; both projects did not make it out of development.

He graduated from Harvard College. He was also the co-founder of Constellation.tv, a service presenting live interactive events built around streaming movies.

== Philanthropy ==
Carolin worked briefly with Red Feather Development Group, a non-profit organization that builds straw-bale homes on Native American reservations, for whom he was involved with the short film Building One House.

== Filmography ==
Year	Title	Director	Producer	Writer	Notes
2010	Earth Made of Glass	No	Yes	Yes	Documentary film
2011	10 Years	No	Yes	No	
2012	Magic Mike	No	Yes	Yes	Also actor
2015	Magic Mike XXL	No	Yes	Yes	
2017	Logan Lucky	No	Yes	No	
2018	6 Balloons	No	Yes	No	
2021	America: The Motion Picture	No	Yes	No	
2022	Dog	Yes	Yes	Yes	Directorial debut, co-directed with Channing Tatum
2023	Magic Mike's Last Dance	No	Yes	Yes	
TBA	Isle of Man	Yes	Yes	Yes	Filming

=== Executive producer ===
- White House Down (2013)
- 22 Jump Street (2014)
- War Dog: A Soldier's Best Friend (2017) (Documentary)
- Fatherhood (2021)
