= Susan Littenberg =

American film editor (born 1968)

- Born: 1968 (age 57–58); United States
- Occupation: Film editor
- Years active: 1991–present
- Children: Charlotte Littenberg

Susan Littenberg (born 1968) is an American film editor.

Littenberg graduated from Ocean Township High School in 1985 in before receiving a Bachelor of Arts in Liberal Arts from the University of Delaware in 1990. Littenberg began her career as an assistant editor working with filmmakers such as Jim Jarmusch, Hal Hartley and Ang Lee. She began her feature editing career as the lead editor of Steven Soderbergh's Gray's Anatomy. She was the editor of films such as Tadpole, 13 Going on 30, A Lot like Love, Charlotte's Web, Bride Wars, and Easy A. Littenberg was nominated for Best Edited Feature Film – Comedy or Musical for Easy A at the 2010 American Cinema Editors Awards. She teaches at UCLA, has taught at AFI, The Edit Center in New York City, the Main International Film Workshops and the City College of New York.

== Filmography ==
Year	Film	Director	Other notes
1996	Gray's Anatomy	Steven Soderbergh	
1997	Up on the Roof	Jackie Turnure	
1999	Henry Hill	David Kantar	
2001	Jump Tomorrow	Joel Hopkins	
2002	Tadpole	Gary Winick	
2002	Easter	Richard Caliban	
2004	13 Going on 30	Gary Winick	
2005	A Lot like Love	Nigel Cole	
2006	Charlotte's Web	Gary Winick	with Sabrina Plisco
2008	Five Dollars a Day	Nigel Cole	
2009	Bride Wars	Gary Winick	
2010	And Everything Is Going Fine	Steven Soderbergh	
2010	Easy A	Will Gluck	Nominated - ACE Eddie Award for Best Edited Feature Film – Comedy or Musical
2012	Lola Versus	Daryl Wein	
2013	The Love Punch	Joel Hopkins	
2016	Nina	Cynthia Mort	
2018	All About Nina	Eva Vives	with Saira Haider
