= Gray's Anatomy (film) =

- Release poster
- Directed by: Steven Soderbergh
- Written by: Spalding Gray; Renée Shafransky
- Produced by: John Hardy
- Starring: Spalding Gray
- Cinematography: Elliot Davis
- Edited by: Susan Littenberg
- Music by: Cliff Martinez
- Production company: BBC Films
- Distributed by: IFC Films
- Release dates: September 11, 1996 (TIFF); March 19, 1997 (U.S.)
- Running time: 80 minutes
- Countries: United Kingdom; United States
- Language: English
- Budget: $350,000
- Box office: $29,090

Gray's Anatomy is a 1996 comedy documentary film directed by Steven Soderbergh involving a dramatized monologue by actor/writer Spalding Gray. The title is taken from the classic human anatomy textbook Gray's Anatomy, originally written by Henry Gray in 1858. It was shot in ten days in late January 1996 during a break Soderbergh had from post-production on his previous film, Schizopolis.

The monologist film is about Spalding Gray, the main character, who is diagnosed with a rare ocular condition called macular pucker. After hearing all of his options, such as Christian Science, Native American sweat lodges, and the "Elvis Presley of psychic surgeons", and the dangers of what surgery could bring, he decides to go through the other forms of medicine provided. This in turn takes him on a journey around the world and steers him away from surgery more so because of religious reasons, often in a dramatic and humorous fashion.

== Background ==
Spalding Gray was raised in Rhode Island and attended school in Massachusetts. Gray's style as an actor was influenced by Allen Ginsberg, Ramblin' Jack Elliot, and the American Autobiographical movement. He mostly worked in experimental theater. In 1977, he co-founded the Wooster Theater Group in New York City. Two years later he performed his first monologue: Sex and Death at the Age of 14. In the '80s Gray traveled to Thailand where he won two Independent Spirit Awards for the film Swimming to Cambodia. He appeared in several independent films in the '90s before Gray's Anatomy was published.

== Release ==
This was the fourth and last of Gray's theatrically released monologue films, following Swimming to Cambodia, Monster in a Box, and Terrors of Pleasure.

The film is available on DVD. A remastered version was released by The Criterion Collection on DVD and Blu-ray in June 2012.

== Reception ==
Janet Maslin of the New York Times gave a positive review, calling it "A chatty, colorful, nicely sardonic account of how a crisis led Mr. Gray to assess his medical state, consider his mortality and take one more funny, self-dramatizing look at the eccentric world around him."

Desson Thomson of the Washington Post also reviewed the film positively, stating "Gray's Anatomy finds Spalding Gray turning a bout with a bizarre ocular condition into a dizzying, absorbing odyssey of the neurotic mind."

The Digital Fix described Gray's Anatomy as "very witty and a pleasure to listen to. As he passes fifty, Gray starts to worry about his own death before he finds the sight in his left eye is becoming distorted. Learning that he has a macular pucker, Gray seeks out alternative therapies, including mass nude encounters in a sweatbox, a raw-vegetable diet and a trip to the Philippines to meet a psychic surgeon."

On the other hand, the San Francisco Chronicle described Gray's Anatomy as an unremarkable story. "There's something intrinsically insincere about the whole quest. This creeping sense that Gray isn't really interested in anything he's talking about – that he, alone, is the subject of his own obsession gives Gray's Anatomy a distasteful edge."

The Chicago Tribune described Gray's Anatomy as "demonstrating that fully stimulating the senses isn't the same as fully engaging them. The film begins as ordinary as could be and then continues with scenery changes, lighting effects, and moody music."
