= Renée Shafransky =

American writer, producer, and psychotherapist

- Born: Queens, New York City, New York, U.S.
- Occupations: Writer; film producer; psychotherapist
- Spouse: Spalding Gray (1991–1993)
- Website: reneeshafranskyauthor.com

Renée Shafransky is an American writer, independent film producer and director, and psychotherapist. She is known for her collaborations with writer/actor/monologist Spalding Gray, and as a founding member of the Collective for Living Cinema. Her novel Tips for Living was published in 2018.

== Career ==
After studying under avant-garde filmmaker Ken Jacobs, Shafransky became a founding member and program director of the Collective for Living Cinema, a premiere venue for avant-garde film. She also edited the scholarly film journal, No Rose, in the late 1970s.

Shafransky met and started dating Spalding Gray in 1979. She became his collaborator and director, and figured prominently in many of his monologues.

In 1983, Shafransky produced Variety, directed by Bette Gordon and written by Kathy Acker, which was selected for the Director's Fortnight at the 1984 Cannes Film Festival. She also wrote articles and film reviews for The Village Voice. In 1986, Jonathan Demme directed a film of Gray's acclaimed monologue, Swimming to Cambodia, which Shafransky produced. Shafransky and Gray co-wrote a sitcom called Bedtime Story, which aired on PBS in 1987. Shafransky continued collaborating with Gray, co-writing projects and directing his monologues, including Monster in a Box in 1990.

Shafransky collaborated with Bette Gordon again, writing the segment "Greed: Pay to Play," for the 1986 film Seven Women, Seven Sins, in which seven internationally acclaimed women directors reinterpret the seven deadly sins. She went on to direct Three Hotels, by award-winning playwright Jon Robin Baitz, at the Magic Theater in San Francisco 1994. Shafransky then spent time in Hollywood, writing screenplays for major studios and HBO, and working with directors Harold Ramis and Mike Newell.

Shafransky now practices as a psychotherapist in New York City and Sag Harbor, and has contributed to The Southampton Review.

== Filmography ==
- Variety (1983) Producer
- Seven Women, Seven Sins (1986) Writer
- Swimming to Cambodia (1987) Producer and director of original stage production
- Bedtime Story (1987) Writer
- Monster in a Box (1992) Producer and director of original stage production
- Gray's Anatomy (1996) Co-writer and director of original stage production
