= And Everything Is Going Fine =

2010 American documentary about Spalding Gray

- Theatrical release poster © Neil Kellerhouse
- Directed by: Steven Soderbergh
- Produced by: Kathie Russo; Amy Hobby; Joshua Blum
- Starring: Spalding Gray
- Edited by: Susan Littenberg
- Music by: Forrest Gray
- Production companies: Twenty Pounder; Washington Square Films
- Distributed by: Sundance Selects
- Release date: January 23, 2010 (Slamdance)
- Running time: 89 minutes
- Country: United States
- Language: English

And Everything Is Going Fine is a 2010 documentary film directed by Steven Soderbergh about the life of monologist Spalding Gray. It premiered on January 23, 2010 at the Slamdance Film Festival and was screened at the 2010 SXSW Film Festival and the 2010 Maryland Film Festival. Soderbergh had earlier directed Gray's filmed monologue, Gray's Anatomy.

Soderbergh decided against recording narration and new interviews. The film instead consists entirely of archival footage, principally numerous excerpts from monologues by and interviews with Gray, spanning some 20 years, as well as home movies of Gray as an infant. Music for the film was composed by Gray's son Forrest.

== Home media ==
On June 19, 2012, American video distribution company The Criterion Collection released And Everything Is Going Fine on Blu-ray and DVD. Both editions contain a new digital restoration of the film, the original trailer to the film, the first monologue of Gray recorded in 1982 (although first delivered in 1979), a video interview discussing the film's production history, and a new essay by Nell Casey. Exclusive to the Blu-ray edition is an uncompressed monaural soundtrack accompanying the film.
