= Nigel Bluck =

New Zealand cinematographer

- Education: Elam School of Fine Arts, Auckland; Australian Film Television and Radio School (Cinematography)
- Occupation: Cinematographer
- Years active: 1998–present
- Website: nigelbluck.com

Nigel Bluck is a New Zealand cinematographer known for his work in feature films and television across New Zealand, Australia and the United States.

He made his feature film debut as cinematographer with Stickmen (2001) and later worked as a second unit cinematographer on The Lord of the Rings trilogy.

== Early life and education ==
Bluck completed his high school education at Dunedin's Logan Park High School.

He studied cinematography at the Australian Film Television and Radio School (AFTRS).

== Career ==
Bluck's first feature film as director of photography was Stickmen (2001), directed by Hamish Rothwell. The two had previously collaborated on multiple television commercials. The film employed a bleach bypass technique during the interneg stage. Due to Bluck's relative inexperience, the New Zealand Film Commission appointed cinematographer Alun Bollinger MNZM as the A-camera operator and mentor on the project.

Early in his career, Bluck worked as a second unit cinematographer on The Lord of the Rings trilogy. At the time, he had recently completed Stickmen, in Wellington. His involvement with the project came through a connection with cinematographer Andrew Lesnie, whom he met via his partner, who was working as a camera assistant on the production. Lesnie attended the premiere of Stickmen and offered Bluck the position despite the film containing no visual effects. Bluck later described the experience as a significant learning opportunity, involving nine months of stage work focused on bluescreen lighting and early visual effects techniques.

Joyce King Heyraud reviewed Handsome Harry in Psychological Perspectives: A Quarterly Journal of Jungian Thought and stated that "The photography (Nigel Bluck) captures the light and mood reminiscent of American artist Edward Hopper".

Stephen Holden, in the opening paragraph of his New York Times review, wrote that "here, on the edge of the outback, the environment is so luminous that every outdoor shot has an aura of magical realism" in reference to The Tree (2010), a French-Australian co-production shot by Bluck.

Bluck has stated that his work on the Australian film Son of a Gun contributed to him being hired for True Detective. According to Bluck, his agent presented the film to executive producer Scott Stephens, who expressed interest after multiple viewings. He noted that the series marked his first experience working in television and within a multi-director format. His wife, Jac Fitzgerald, served as the second unit director of photography.

"I feel that my natural curiosities and inclinations toward art, science and storytelling fit best in the (cinematography form of the) filmmaking process".

— Nigel Bluck in an interview with Variety.
April 21, 2015.

In Tigertail, Bluck shot the flashback sequences on 16mm to give them a hazy, half-remembered memory look.

Bluck was awarded Best Cinematography at the San Sebastian Film Festival for his work on Half Moon.

== Personal life ==
Bluck resides in Los Angeles with his wife, cinematographer Jac Fitzgerald, who is originally from Christchurch, and their son.

== Filmography ==
=== Film ===
Year	Title	Director	Notes	Ref(s)
2001	Stickmen	Hamish Rothwell		
2006	Like Minds	Gregory J. Read		
2006	Half Moon	Bahman Ghobadi	With Crighton Bone	
2007	The Home Song Stories	Tony Ayres	Best Cinematography - AFI Award, Kodak IF Award for Best Cinematography	
2009	Handsome Harry	Bette Gordon		
2010	The Tree	Julie Bertuccelli		
2014	Son of a Gun	Julius Avery		
2015	Lady Grey	Alain Choquart		
2019	The Peanut Butter Falcon	Tyler Nilson; Michael Schwartz		
2020	Tigertail	Alan Yang		
2022	The Unbearable Weight of Massive Talent	Tom Gormican		
2023	Americana	Tony Tost		
2025	Lilo & Stitch	Dean Fleischer Camp		
2025	Easy's Waltz	Nic Pizzolatto	With Jimmy Lindsey	
2025	Anaconda	Tom Gormican		
TBA	42.6 Years †	Michael Schwartz	Post-production	

=== Television ===
Year	Title	Director	Notes
2015–2019	True Detective		10 episodes (Including Season 2 as a whole)
2017	S.W.A.T.	Justin Lin	Episode "Pilot"
2019	Prodigal Son	Lee Toland Krieger	Episode "Pilot"

=== Additional credits ===
2nd unit director of photography

- 2001 - The Lord of the Rings: The Fellowship of the Ring
- 2002 - The Lord of the Rings: The Two Towers
- 2003 - The Lord of the Rings: The Return of the King

Additional photographer

- 2004 - In My Father's Den
- 2016 - Deadpool
