= Handsome Harry =

2009 film by Bette Gordon

- Directed by: Bette Gordon
- Written by: Nicolas T. Proferes
- Produced by: Jamin O'Brien; Marilyn Haft; Eric Goldman; Jamey Sheridan
- Starring: Jamey Sheridan; Steve Buscemi; Mariann Mayberry; Aidan Quinn; John Savage; Campbell Scott; Titus Welliver; Karen Young
- Cinematography: Nigel Bluck
- Edited by: Keiko Deguchi
- Music by: Anton Sanko; Jumaane Smith
- Production company: Worldview Entertainment
- Distributed by: Paladin/Emerging Pictures; Screen Media Films
- Release date: April 25, 2009 (Tribeca)
- Running time: 93 minutes
- Country: United States
- Language: English
- Budget: $1 million

Handsome Harry is a 2009 American film written by Nicholas T. Proferes and directed by Bette Gordon. It was the first film produced by Worldview Entertainment and stars Jamey Sheridan, Steve Buscemi, Mariann Mayberry, Aidan Quinn, John Savage, Campbell Scott, Titus Welliver, and Karen Young. The film premiered at the 2009 Tribeca Film Festival and was released theatrically in 2010 by Paladin/Emerging Pictures and on DVD/VOD by Screen Media Films.

== Plot ==
Handsome Harry is the story of Harry Sweeney's journey to find forgiveness from an old Navy friend. One day, Harry gets a call from an old Navy buddy, Kelley, on his deathbed. At first, Harry wants nothing to do with Kelley, but soon, memories and guilt overcome him, and he goes on a journey to confront his old friends.

First, he meets Kelley in a Philadelphia hospital. Kelley asks Harry to seek forgiveness from David on his behalf. Kelley dies in the hospital the next day. Harry then goes on to meet more of his Navy buddies to find the truth about what happened the night they assaulted David together. Somebody dropped a generator on David's hand that night, but Harry could not recollect who it was.

In time, it's revealed that Harry and David had an affair back in the Navy. Kelley found Harry and David in a sexually compromising position in the shower. In fear of repercussion, Harry turned on David. Kelley and the rest of the gang, including Harry, got drunk and assaulted David. It was in the end revealed that Harry was the one who dropped the generator on David, maiming him for life.

== Cast ==
- Jamey Sheridan as Harry Sweeney
- Steve Buscemi as Thomas Kelley
- Mariann Mayberry as Judy Rheems
- Aidan Quinn as Professor Porter
- John Savage as Peter Rheems
- Campbell Scott as David Kagan
- Titus Welliver as Gebhardt
- Karen Young as Muriel
- Asher Grodman as Bobby Sweeney
