= Mercedes Bryce Morgan =

American filmmaker and music video director

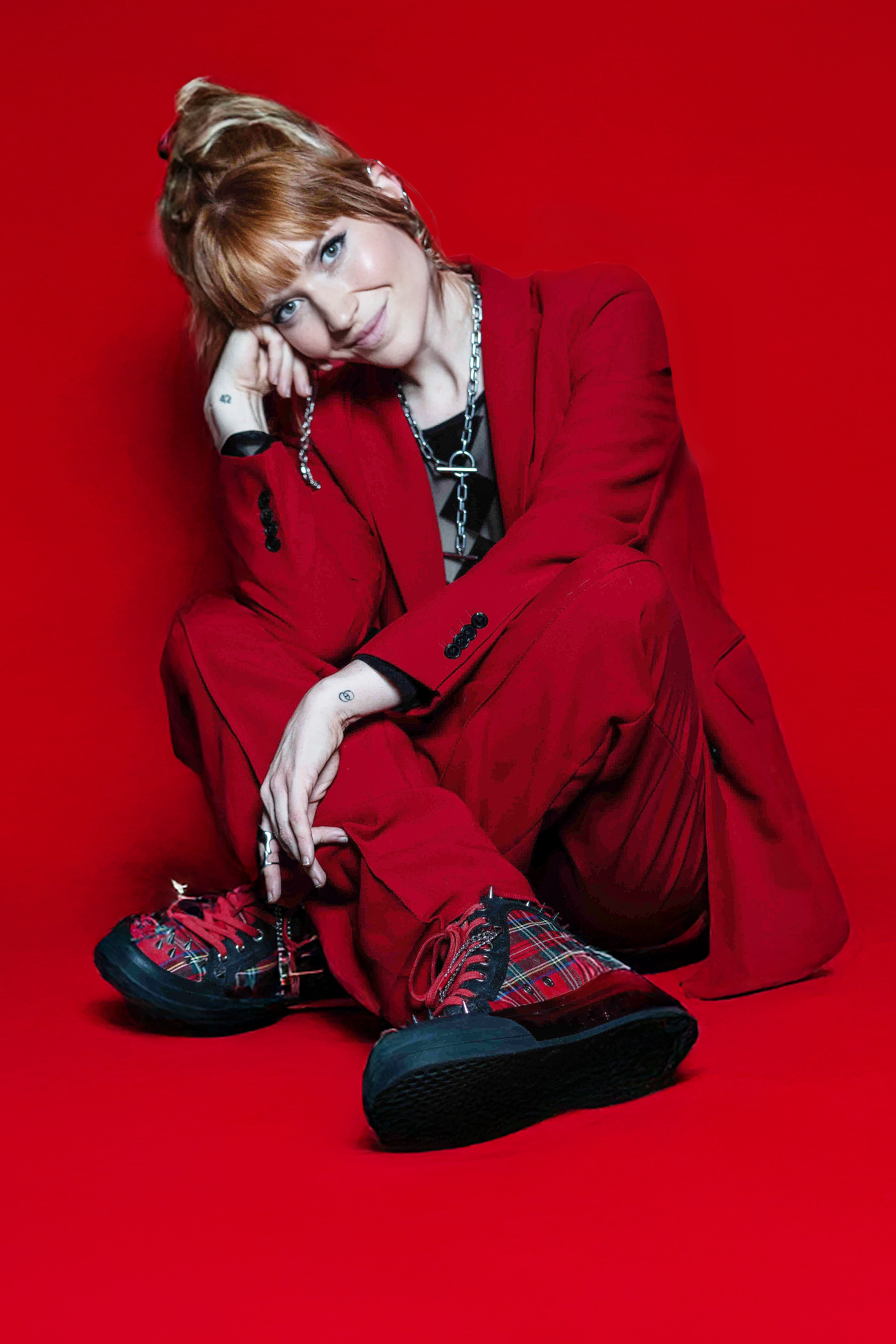
- Born: U.S.
- Occupations: Film director; screenwriter; film producer; music video director
- Years active: 2013–present

Mercedes Bryce Morgan is an American filmmaker and music video director. She is best known for directing the films Fixation and Bone Lake.

== Career ==
Mercedes graduated with a BA in Film and Television Production from the USC School of Cinematic Arts in Los Angeles. She directed Todrick Hall’s visual album "All American" Forbidden. She has also directed music videos for artists such as Marshmello, Saygrace, Slushii, Chvrches and Todrick Hall.

Mercedes's feature film directorial debut Fixation, premiered at the Toronto International Film Festival in 2022. In 2022, she directed her second feature film Spoonful of Sugar, premiered on Shudder. In 2024, she directed the thriller Bone Lake for LD Entertainment, which premiered at Fantastic Fest.

== Select filmography ==
Year	Title	Contribution	Note
2013	Love and Laundry	Director and writer	Short film
2015	Virtual Morality	Director, writer and producer	1 episode
2017	Fantasies	Director	4 episodes
2019	Five Points	Director	3 episodes
2020	Come F*ck My Robot	Director and writer	Short film
2022	Fixation	Director and writer	Feature film
2022	Spoonful of Sugar	Director	Feature film
2024	Bone Lake	Director	Feature film
2026	Kaet Might Die	Director	post-production

=== Selected music videos ===
Year	Title	Artist	Roles	Notes
2018	"All American" Forbidden	Todrick Hall	Director	
2018	"Happier"	Marshmello	Director	
2018	"Flashbacks"	Marshmello	Director	
2019	"Here with Me"	Marshmello	Director	
2019	"Doin' Too Much"	Saygrace	Director	

== Awards and nominations ==
Year	Result	Award	Category	Work	Ref.
2024	Won	Brooklyn Horror Film Festival	Bronze Audience Award	Bone Lake	
