= The United States of America (film) =

1975 film by Bette Gordon and James Benning

- Directed by: James Benning; Bette Gordon
- Starring: James Benning; Bette Gordon
- Release date: 1975
- Running time: 27 min.
- Country: United States

The United States of America is a 1975 film by James Benning and Bette Gordon.

== Summary ==
A conceptual bicentennial film dealing with spatial and temporal spaces about two travelers in their car alongside the relationships to changes in America (political, social and geographical) from New York to Los Angeles.

== Legacy ==
The Criterion Channel describes it as "one of the major works of the structuralist film movement of the 1970s".

A remake of the film, also directed by Benning, premiered in 2022.

== See also ==
- United States Bicentennial
- Road movie
