= Heavy Petting (1989 film) =

- Directed by: Obie Benz; Joshua Waletzky
- Written by: Pierce Rafferty
- Starring: David Byrne; Abbie Hoffman; Ann Magnuson; Spalding Gray; William Burroughs; Laurie Anderson; Sandra Bernhard; Allen Ginsberg; Josh Mostel; John Oates
- Release date: 1989
- Running time: 74 minutes
- Country: United States
- Language: English

Heavy Petting is a 1989 documentary directed by Obie Benz and Joshua Waletzky.

== Overview ==
Celebrities reveal their first sexual experiences.
