= The Brave One (2007 film) =

American action-thriller film

- Theatrical release poster
- Directed by: Neil Jordan
- Screenplay by: Roderick Taylor; Bruce A. Taylor; Cynthia Mort
- Story by: Roderick Taylor; Bruce A. Taylor
- Produced by: Susan Downey; Joel Silver
- Starring: Jodie Foster; Terrence Howard; Naveen Andrews; Nicky Katt; Mary Steenburgen
- Cinematography: Philippe Rousselot
- Edited by: Tony Lawson
- Music by: Dario Marianelli
- Production companies: Village Roadshow Pictures; Silver Pictures
- Distributed by: Warner Bros. Pictures (Worldwide); Roadshow Films (Australia)
- Release dates: September 14, 2007 (United States); October 11, 2007 (Australia)
- Running time: 122 minutes
- Countries: United States; Australia
- Language: English
- Budget: $70 million
- Box office: $69 million

The Brave One is a 2007 vigilante action-thriller film directed by Neil Jordan and written by Roderick Taylor, Bruce A. Taylor and Cynthia Mort. The film stars Jodie Foster and Terrence Howard, with Naveen Andrews, Nicky Katt, Zoë Kravitz, Mary Steenburgen and Luis Da Silva in supporting roles.

Erica Bain is a New York City radio host whose fiancé is beaten to death by criminals so, terrified for her safety, she buys a pistol and undergoes a personality transformation, becoming a vigilante. Detective Sean Mercer investigates the vigilante shootings, which lead him closer and closer to Bain.

The Brave One was released in the United States on September 14, 2007. The film received mixed reviews from critics who acclaimed Foster's performance but criticized its execution. It grossed $69 million worldwide. At the 65th Golden Globe Awards, Foster was nominated for Best Actress Motion Picture in a Drama.

== Plot ==
Radio host Erica Bain and her fiancé Dr. David Kirmani are viciously attacked by three men while walking their dog in Central Park; the men record the assault on their phones and take Erica's engagement ring and her dog. David dies from his injuries, and Erica is unable to continue her life as normal.

Traumatized and living in fear, Erica attempts to purchase a gun legally but is denied a sale due to having no gun license. A nearby black market gun dealer overhears her desperation and offers to sell her a Kahr K9 pistol. Unwilling to wait 30 days for a legal firearm, Erica buys the handgun from him.

One evening while Erica is at a convenience store, a man enters and shoots the store's cashier to death. Hearing Erica's cell phone ring, the man stalks her in the aisles before she kills him with three shots. Another night on a subway car, two men harass the passengers, all of whom leave except Erica. The men then threaten her with a knife, but she kills them both.

Later, Erica attempts to save a prostitute by threatening her pimp. When he attempts to run them down with his car, Erica shoots him in the head, causing his car to run over the prostitute. She is injured but lives.

Fuelled by rage and a need for vengeance, Erica begins to track down the three men who killed David. Meanwhile, she strikes up a friendship with Detective Sean Mercer, who is investigating the vigilante killings around the city. The detective shares the name of a vicious criminal he is unable to prosecute.

When the criminal is found dead near a parking garage, Mercer inspects the area and begins to suspect Erica. He takes her with him to interview the prostitute she had saved, but the prostitute does not let on that she recognizes Erica. Mercer privately indicates to Erica that he suspects her but is struggling with what to do about it.

The police ask Erica to identify one of the suspects in her attack. Though she recognizes the assailant, she does not identify him. She is later informed that the police have found her engagement ring at a pawn shop and goes there to get a name, address, and phone number of who sold it to them. She tracks down one of her attacker's ex-girlfriends, who sends Erica the video recording of her attack and his address. Erica forwards the video to Mercer.

Erica tracks down all three men, confronting and killing two of them before freeing her dog. She struggles with the third attacker, who gains the upper hand just as Mercer arrives. As Mercer attempts to arrest the attacker, Erica retrieves her weapon and prepares to execute him.

Mercer persuades Erica to lower her gun, but after looking into her pleading eyes, hands her his own gun to use instead, so she shoots the attacker dead. He then insists she wound him with her gun, which she does, allowing them to frame her attackers for the vigilante killings. Mercer then places her gun in the last attacker's hand, and Erica walks away through Central Park joined by her dog.

== Music ==
The music for the movie was composed by Dario Marianelli, featuring soundtracks by Sarah McLachlan.

== Cast ==
- Jodie Foster as Erica Bain
- Terrence Howard as Detective Sean Mercer
- Naveen Andrews as Dr. David Kirmani
- Nicky Katt as Detective Vitale
- Zoë Kravitz as Chloe
- Mary Steenburgen as Carol
- Luis Da Silva as Lee
- Jane Adams as Nicole
- John Magaro as Ethan
- Angel Sing as Black Market Gun Dealer
- Dana Eskelson as Police Sketch Artist
- Carmen Ejogo as Jackie
- James Biberi as Detective Pitney
- Lenny Venito as Mortell
- Larry Fessenden as Sandy Combs
- An Nguyen as Ida Combs

== Home video release ==
- The Brave One was released on DVD & Blu-Ray Tuesday, February 5, 2008.

== Release ==
=== Box office ===
In its opening weekend in the United States and Canada, the film was #1 at the box office, grossing $13,471,488 in 2,755 theaters. As of December 29, 2007, the film has grossed $69,787,394 worldwide—$36,793,804 in the United States and Canada and $32,993,590 in other territories.

=== Critical reception ===
The Brave One received mixed reviews from critics. Rotten Tomatoes gives it a score of 43% based on 183 reviews. The site's consensus states: "Magnetic performances by Jodie Foster and Terrence Howard can't quite compensate for The Brave One's problematic and unconvincing eye-for-an-eye moral." On Metacritic, the film had an average score of 56%, based on 33 reviews. Audiences polled by CinemaScore gave the film an average grade of "B+" on an A+ to F scale.

Roger Ebert of the Chicago Sun-Times gave the film three and a half out of four stars, saying Foster and Howard "are perfectly modulated in the kinds of scenes difficult for actors to play, where they both know more than they're saying, and they both know it."

=== Accolades ===
Foster was nominated for Best Performance by an Actress in a Motion Picture – Drama at the 65th Golden Globe Awards.

== See also ==
- Bernhard Goetz
- Death Wish
  - Death Wish (1974 film) · cfr. talk
- Eye for an Eye
- Taxi Driver
