= Variety (1983 film) =

American drama film

- Box cover art for Variety (Bette Gordon, 1983)
- Directed by: Bette Gordon
- Screenplay by: Kathy Acker
- Story by: Bette Gordon
- Produced by: Renée Shafransky
- Starring: Sandy McLeod; Will Patton; Richard M. Davidson; Luis Guzmán; Nan Goldin
- Cinematography: Tom DiCillo; John Foster
- Edited by: Ila von Hasperg
- Music by: John Lurie
- Production companies: Channel Four Films; Variety Motion Pictures; Zweites Deutsches Fernsehen (ZDF)
- Distributed by: Horizon Films
- Release dates: September 1983 (TIFF); March 8, 1985 (United States)
- Running time: 100 minutes
- Country: United States
- Language: English

Variety is a 1983 American drama film directed by Bette Gordon with a screenplay by Kathy Acker from a story by Gordon. The film stars Sandy McLeod, Will Patton, and Richard M. Davidson. The film follows a young woman who takes a job at a New York City pornographic theater and becomes increasingly obsessed with a wealthy patron who may or may not be involved with the mafia.

== Plot ==
Christine, an aspiring author, desperately needs a job. Her friend Nan gives her a tip that the Variety, a pornographic theater in Times Square, is looking for a ticket-taker. Christine takes the job and becomes interested in the movies that are playing. Her boyfriend Mark, an investigative journalist, is concerned and confused about her interest in her new job. At the Variety, Christine meets a rich patron, Louie, with whom she spontaneously decides to go on a date. After he abruptly leaves, she follows him in a cab, watching while he meets a mysterious man. Later, she shares her suspicions with Mark that he is involved in some kind of mafia operation. Increasingly obsessed, she follows Louie to Asbury Park, New Jersey, sneaking into his hotel room, from which she steals a pornographic magazine. Her obsession with Louie and her own awakened sexuality ultimately leads her to call and threaten him unless he meets her. The final, mysterious shot is of an empty intersection at Fulton and South Street, where Christine has told Louie to meet her.

== Cast ==
- Sandy McLeod as Christine
- Will Patton as Mark
- Richard M. Davidson as Louie
- Luis Guzmán as Jose
- Nan Goldin as Nan
- Mark Boone Junior as Business Manager/Customer
- Spalding Gray as Obscene Phone Caller

== Production ==
After meeting Kathy Acker, Bette Gordon asked her to collaborate on a screenplay for a new film. Gordon also collaborated with the burgeoning New York film scene: "The film is a sort of Who’s Who of downtown street cred: music by John Lurie, cinematography by frequent Jarmusch collaborator Tom de Cillo, script by former sex worker and Pushcart Prize-winning feminist novelist Kathy Acker, and roles played by Spalding Gray, Luis Guzmán, Mark Boone Junior and photographer Nan Goldin, who also took production stills," which were published in 2009. Producer Christine Vachon, who would become a pioneer in the New Queer Cinema movement, also worked on the film as a production assistant.

The film was produced with an initial $80,000 budget, provided by ZDF West German Television, Great Britain's Channel 4, and the New York State Council.

== Release ==
Variety premiered at the 1983 Toronto Film Festival and later screened at the 1984 Cannes Film Festival. It was given a small theatrical release in the US on March 8, 1985.

== Reception ==
Contemporary reviews were mixed; while New Statesman's John Coleman disliked Acker's "dreadful dialogue," Amy Taubin championed the film in The Village Voice, describing how "the editing alternates conventional Hollywood action cutting with sequences that forcibly distance the viewer." Janet Maslin wrote in The New York Times that the film had a "painfully underwritten screenplay (by Kathy Acker) and a static, uncommunicative directorial style." Critics compared Variety to Hitchcock films like Rear Window and Vertigo.

The film was released in a particularly important time for feminist filmmakers, and Gordon was both criticized and praised for making a film about pornography. Gordon presented at the watershed 1982 Barnard Conference on Sexuality with Kaja Silverman, arguing that since cinema itself had recently been theorized as voyeuristic, then pornographic films have really become "extreme examples of mainstream Hollywood cinema, [since both] employ the voyeuristic mode to exploit women as objects of male fantasy and male desire." In 2011, Amy Taubin wrote in Artforum, "Gordon realized that the problem of the objectification of women in film has less to do with the display of the body than with who has control of the narrative—of the desire that motors it and of how that desire is resolved, or left as an opening into the unknown. She also understood, psychologically and pragmatically, that for a woman to become a filmmaker or to simply enjoy movies, she had to take pleasure in her own voyeurism."

== Home media ==
In September 2020, Variety received a 2K restoration on Blu-ray from Kino Lorber. The release includes making-of featurettes and Gordon’s 1981 short film Anybody’s Woman.
