= Scott Jaeck =

American actor

Scott Jaeck (born October 29, 1954, in Milwaukee, Wisconsin) is an American actor. He attended New Trier High School in Winnetka, Illinois, graduating in 1973. He attended the University of Wisconsin–Milwaukee. He was married to actress Mariann Mayberry, a member of the Steppenwolf Theater Company ensemble in Chicago, Illinois, until her death on August 1, 2017.

His venture into soap operas lasted from 1987 to 1988, when he portrayed Cain Garver on Santa Barbara. He had recurring appearances on Charmed as Samuel Wilder and ER as Dr. Steven Flint. He appeared in "The Finale" episode of Seinfeld as a police officer, and in episodes of two Star Trek spinoffs, Star Trek: The Next Generation and Star Trek: Voyager. He has appeared on Broadway in August: Osage County.

Regionally he has appeared at theaters including Milwaukee Repertory Theater, Pasadena Playhouse, Indiana Repertory Theatre, Alliance Theatre and The Shakespeare Theatre Company in Washington, D.C. Scott has also worked with the Royal Shakespeare Company at Stratford-upon-Avon.

== Filmography ==
=== Film ===
Year	Title	Role	Notes
1989	An Innocent Man	Albert	
1997	Washington Square	John Ludlow	
2007	The Lucky Ones	Guitar Store Owner	
2018	The Chaperone	Older Man	
2019	The Wisdom Tooth	Doctor	
2024	Oh, Canada	Jackson Chapman	

=== Television ===
Year	Title	Role	Notes
1984	Hot Pursuit	Robert	"Identity Crisis"
1985	T.J. Hooker	Dave Manetti	"Street Bait"
1985	Hotel	David	"Crossroads"
1985	Newhart	Marv Stribling	"What Makes Dick Run"
1985	The Twilight Zone	Pete (segment "Kentucky Rye")	"Healer/Children's Zoo/Kentucky Rye"
1985	Remington Steele	Michael Fitzgerald	"Steele Blushing"
1985	An Early Frost	Phil	TV movie
1986	Shadow Chasers	Michael Tipton	"Ahead of Time"
1987–88	Santa Barbara	Cain Garver	series regular (230 episodes)
1989	Hunter	Glenn Kates	"Partners"
1989	Beauty and the Beast	Kanin	"A Gentle Rain"
1989	Hard Time on Planet Earth	Lieutenant Taylor	"Death Do Us Part"
1989	Designing Women	Jack	"Manhunt"
1990	Alien Nation	Henry Glass	"Generation to Generation"
1990	Booker	Agent Krantz	"Hacker"
1990	Capital News	Joey Donello	"Pilot"
1990	Fine Things	Doctor Finn	TV movie; uncredited
1990	China Beach	Dr. Singer	recurring role (4 episodes)
1991	Aftermath: A Test of Love	Dr. Sands	TV movie
1991	K-9	unknown role	TV movie
1991	The Wonder Years	Mr. Arlo Bottner	"Day One"
1991–93	Beverly Hills, 90210	Mr. Chapman	recurring role (5 episodes)
1992	Star Trek: The Next Generation	Administrator	"The Inner Light"
1992	Angel Street	Dr. Javers Travers	"Midnight Times a Hundred"
1992	Ring of the Musketeers	Ross	TV movie
1992–96	Renegade	Peter Bancroft / Professor	2 episodes
1993	Street Justice	Detective Dave Hobart	"Obsession"
1993	Life Goes On	Clinical Doctor	"Five to Midnight"
1993	Crime & Punishment	unknown role	"Simple Trust"
1993	FBI: The Untold Stories	Agent Curtis	"Yablonski"
1994	Baby Brokers	Scott Tillman	TV movie
1994	L.A. Law	Dr. Frederick Schodel, DDS	"Tunnel of Love"
1994	Ray Alexander: A Taste for Justice	Maxwell	TV movie
1994–2002	ER	Dr. Steven Flint	recurring role (12 episodes)
1995	Star Trek: Voyager	Lieutenant Commander Cavit	"Caretaker"; uncredited
1995	University Hospital	Henry Adams	"You Can Run..."
1995–96	JAG	Commander Dooley	recurring role (3 episodes)
1996	Picket Fences	unknown role	"Winner Takes All"
1996	Dark Skies	Cochran	"Dreamland"
1996	The Larry Sanders Show	Jake	"Ellen, or Isn't She?"
1996–97	Chicago Hope	Gerald Fortin	2 episodes
1997	Mad About You	Pool Player from A.A.	"On the Road"
1997	Killing Mr. Griffin	Vince McConnell	TV movie
1997	Pacific Palisades	Mr. Caldwell	2 episodes
1997	NYPD Blue	FBI Agent Kriegel	recurring role (4 episodes)
1997	Brooklyn South	FBI Boss	"Dublin or Nothin' "
1998	The Pretender	Martin Benton	"Stolen"
1998	Seinfeld	Officer Vogel	"The Finale"
1998	The Bold and the Beautiful	Richard Randolph	recurring role (3 episodes)
1999	Party of Five	Ray	"Witness for the Persecution"
1999	Nash Bridges	Dr. Archer	"Crosstalk"
1999	Strange World	Brian Hajek	"Aerode"
1999–2005	Charmed	Sam Wilder	recurring role (3 episodes)
2006	Prison Break	Trenchcoat	2 episodes
2010	Boardwalk Empire	Ward Boss	"Boardwalk Empire"
2013	Elementary	Maxwell Krebs	"The Debuctionist"
2013	Person of Interest	Vincent Cochran	"In Extremis"
2014	Chicago Fire	Firefighters' Attorney	"When Things Got Rough"
2017	The Good Fight	Mr. Loatelli	"Reddick v Bosman"
2018	Madam Secretary	Bob Dawson	"Phase Two"
2019	The Code	Mitchell Burston	"1st Civ Div"
2021	The Blacklist	Chief Bill Russell	"Anne"

== Theatre credits ==
=== Steppenwolf Theatre Company, Chicago ===
- Penelope (2011-2012) .... Dunne (Downstairs Theatre)
- Three Sisters (2012) .... Ivan Chebutykin (Downstairs Theatre)
- Time Stands Still (2012) .... Richard Ehrlich (Upstairs Theatre)

=== Broadway, New York ===
- The Night of the Iguana (1996) .... Hank (Criterion Center Stage Right)
- August: Osage County (2008-2009) .... Sheriff Deon Gilbeau (Roundabout Theatre Company) (play by Tracy Letts)
- Airline Highway (2015) .... Wayne (Samuel J. Friedman Theatre)

=== Goodman Theatre, Chicago ===
- Dinner with Friends (2003/2012) .... Gabe
- The Seagull (2010) ..... Yevgeniy Sergeyevich Dorn
- Stage Kiss (2011) .... Husband/Harrison
- Mary (2011) .... James Jennings
- Uncle Vanya
- Galileo
- A House Not Meant to Stand
- The Night of the Iguana

=== Chicago Shakespeare Theatre ===
- The Tempest (2002) .... Caliban
- Love's Labour's Lost (2002) .... Don Adriano de Armado
- Julius Caesar (2002-2003) .... Marcus Antonius
- Much Ado About Nothing (2005-2006) .... Dogberry
- Troilus and Cressida (2007) .... Agamemnon
- Twelfth Night (2009) .... Sir Toby Belch
- Henry VIII (2013) .... Cardinal Wolsey (Courtyard Theater)
- The Merchant of Venice
- The Merry Wives of Windsor
- Henry IV, Part 1 & Henry IV, Part 2
- Richard II

=== Northlight Theatre, Illinois ===
- Inherit the Wind (2006) .... Henry Drummond
- Red Herring (2006) .... Performer
- How I Learned to Drive
- Light Up the Sky

=== Other stage works ===
- Tribute (1979) .... Jud Templeton
- Long Day's Journey into Night (1984) .... James Tyrone, Jr. (Court Theatre, Chicago)
- Our Town (2003) .... Mr. Webb (Writers' Theatre)
- Benefactors (2004) .... David (Writers' Theatre, Glencoe)
- Someone Who'll Watch Over Me (2005) (Victory Gardens Theater, Chicago)
- Tamburlaine (2007-2008) .... Performer (Sidney Harman Hall, Washington, DC)
- Edward II (2007-2008) .... Archbishop of Canterbury (Sidney Harman Hall, Washington, DC)
- Inherit the Wind (2009) .... Henry Drummond (Cleveland Playhouse)
- The Irish Curse (2010) .... Father Kevin (Soho Playhouse, New York)
- The Normal Heart (Los Angeles Theatre)
- Romeo & Juliet (Milwaukee Theatre)
