= Spalding Gray: Terrors of Pleasure =

1987 film by Thomas Schlamme

- Directed by: Thomas Schlamme
- Written by: Spalding Gray
- Produced by: Cherie Fortis
- Starring: Spalding Gray
- Edited by: John Fortenberry
- Distributed by: Home Box Office
- Release date: 1987
- Running time: 60 minutes
- Country: United States
- Language: English

Spalding Gray: Terrors of Pleasure is a 1987 filming of a monologue written and performed by Spalding Gray. The monologue is composed of material from the original stage performance Swimming to Cambodia that was not used in the 1987 film.

== Overview ==
Gray chronicles the adventures he shared with his girlfriend, Renee, in the Catskills. These took place in and around a cabin he purchased, there in Phoenicia, New York, including the apparent absence of any foundation, and a furnace located in the attic, which is not ideal, if one thinks to take normal heat-flow direction into account.
