= Bone Lake (film) =

2024 film by Mercedes Bryce Morgan

- Theatrical release poster
- Directed by: Mercedes Bryce Morgan
- Written by: Joshua Friedlander
- Produced by: Mickey Liddell; Pete Shilaimon; Jacob Yakob; Joshua Friedlander; Jason Blumenfeld
- Starring: Maddie Hasson; Marco Pigossi; Alex Roe; Andra Nechita
- Cinematography: Nick Matthews
- Edited by: Anjoum Agrama
- Music by: Roque Baños; Ben Cherney
- Production company: LD Entertainment
- Distributed by: Bleecker Street
- Release dates: September 21, 2024 (Fantastic Fest); October 3, 2025 (United States)
- Running time: 94 minutes
- Country: United States
- Language: English
- Box office: $2.2 million

Bone Lake is a 2024 American erotic thriller film directed by Mercedes Bryce Morgan and written by Joshua Friedlander. Maddie Hasson and Marco Pigossi play a couple whose getaway at a remote lakeside house is interrupted by another mysterious couple, played by Alex Roe and Andra Nechita, leading to a disturbing series of mind games and manipulation.

Bone Lake had its world premiere at Fantastic Fest on September 21, 2024, and was released in the United States on October 3, 2025. It was well received by critics and grossed $1.4 million at the box office.

== Plot ==
Couple Sage and Diego arrive at a large lakeside country house they have rented for the weekend. Sage has recently taken an editing job to support Diego so he can pursue a full-time writing career, and the two plan to celebrate before Diego begins working on a novel. Shortly after arriving, Sage and Diego are met by outgoing couple Will and Cin, who also booked the house. Realizing the house has been double-booked, Sage and Diego agree to spend the weekend sharing the house with Will and Cin.

The couples spend the day swimming in Bone Lake and cooking. Will recounts how, beginning in the 1950s, an unknown serial killer used Bone Lake as a dumping site for victims. Cin and Will make sexual advances toward Diego and Sage, respectively. Will discovers Diego plans to propose to Sage over the weekend with his grandmother's wedding ring. Later that night, Will and Cin suggest that the couples break into a series of locked rooms they have found in the house. In one, they discover various sex toys and a sex swing; in the other, they find a Ouija board and several newspaper clippings about disappearances that have occurred around the lake.

The following morning at breakfast, Will unexpectedly proposes to Cin using Diego's grandmother's ring, which he has stolen. Diego confronts him privately, and Will apologizes, claiming Cin is cheating on him and that he stole the ring out of desperation; Diego reveals that Sage cheated on him early into their relationship and that he sympathizes. Will promises to return the ring before the weekend's end. Sage accompanies Will into town to buy groceries, during which he says Diego told him he had caught Sage masturbating in the bathtub, and that Diego fears he cannot sexually please her. Will then makes sexual advances toward Sage. Meanwhile, Cin attempts to seduce Diego at the house.

Later that night, Cin proposes that she and Sage take molly together, which Sage agrees to. Later, when Diego confronts Sage, she confesses she feigned taking the drug, and believes that Will and Cin are attempting to psychologically manipulate them and turn them against each other. Diego and Sage attempt to leave in their electric car, but discover the charger has been unplugged and the battery has only six miles of range left. Will confronts the two, claiming to Diego that he had sex with Sage earlier. Sage denies this, and Diego attempts to back the car out of the driveway, only for them to be struck by Cin in her vehicle.

Sage and Diego awaken in the house, bound with duct tape. Will and Cin reveal that they are in fact Thomas and Alice Price, siblings of a prosperous publishing family. While teenagers, the siblings began an incestuous relationship, and murdered their parents when it was discovered. The two have since terrorized six different couples at their familial estate, putting them through psychological mind games testing the strength of their relationships before killing them. Sage and Diego attempt to flee, and Sage is pursued by Cin, brandishing a butcher knife. Sage manages to strike Cin with a glass, cutting her face, before Will chases after her. Arming herself with an axe, Sage is confronted by Will, who challenges her to strike him in the head before taking control of the axe. Meanwhile, Diego hides under the boat dock, where he stabs Cin through the foot, trapping her.

Will, now armed with an electric chainsaw, attempts to kill Diego, but Sage strikes him through the head with the axe, killing him. Sage and Diego attempt to flee on a boat, where Cin attacks them. Diego strikes Cin in the hand with the axe, dismembering her fingers, before she falls into the water and gets her hair caught in the propeller. Sage reverses the boat, engaging the propeller, effectively killing Cin. Later, while floating on the lake, Diego removes his grandmother's ring from Cin's dismembered finger and proposes to Sage. The two begin laughing hysterically, before staring off in silence.

== Cast ==
- Maddie Hasson as Sage
- Marco Pigossi as Diego
- Alex Roe as Will
- Andra Nechita as Cin
- Clayton Spencer as Brett
- Eliane Reis as Lisa

== Production ==
Bone Lake was directed by Mercedes Bryce Morgan from a screenplay by Joshua Friedlander. The independent film was produced by Mickey Liddell, Pete Shilaimon, and Jacob Yakob produce for LD Entertainment, alongside Friedlander and Jason Blumenfeld.

Principal photography lasted 18 days on location in Georgia, with Nick Matthews (Saw X) serving as director of photography. Matthews cited A Clockwork Orange, Evil Dead II and Funny Games as visual inspirations for the film's camera movements. The score was composed by Roque Baños and Ben Cherney.

== Release ==
Bone Lake had its world premiere at Fantastic Fest on September 21, 2024. In May 2025, Bleecker Street acquired the U.S. distribution rights, followed by the sale of U.K. and Irish rights to Signature Entertainment by British sales agent Mister Smith in July. The film had its U.K. premiere at FrightFest on August 24, 2025, and was released theatrically in the United States on October 3, 2025.

== Reception ==
On the review aggregator website Rotten Tomatoes, 84% of 89 critics' reviews are positive, with an average rating of 6.7/10. The website's consensus reads: "Unwavering in its psychological trappings, Bone Lake is a supercharged game of survival that yields a thrilling rabbit-hole of intrigue and fun." Metacritic, which uses a weighted average, assigned the film a score of 63 out of 100, based on 10 critics, indicating "generally favorable" reviews.

Calum Marsh of The New York Times praised the film as a throwback to the erotic thriller films of the 1990s, describing it as "compelling, if familiar, psychosexual territory for the erotic thriller, a genre that thrives on lust and envy. If you've seen Basic Instinct or Fatal Attraction, you can doubtless guess where Bone Lake is headed, but Morgan handles the escalation into violence adroitly, staging the all-out carnage of the movie's third act with flair." Jim Vorel of Paste made a similar observation, deeming the film "a raunchy throwback thriller with no aversion to cheese, a modern take on the sordid little erotic thriller subgenre, albeit without as much genuinely sexual payoff as it would like for you to believe... It's not as sordid as it plays at, but Bone Lake is wickedly entertaining nonetheless." Brian Tallerico of RogerEbert.com praised the film's performances and noted that it "feels like a European relationship drama for about an hour before exploding in remarkably bloody chaos."

Katie Walsh of the Los Angeles Times gave the film a mixed review, noting: "While there's a certain verve and style to the middle section, where Will and Cin draw in their prey and toy with them, the Grand Guignol climax bears no rhythm or suspense; it's merely a bludgeoning of the audience with carnage—too much too late." Justin Clark of Slant Magazine gave the film an unfavorable review, feeling it lacked horror elements and finding its content too tame despite there being "some level of self-awareness to the film's soapy provocations."

=== Accolades ===
Bone Lake received the bronze Audience Award at the 2024 Brooklyn Horror Film Festival.
