= 42.6 Years =

Upcoming film by Michael Schwartz

- Directed by: Michael Schwartz
- Screenplay by: Seth Reiss
- Story by: Andy Samberg; Seth Reiss
- Produced by: Ali Bell; Andy Samberg; Craig Gillespie
- Starring: Andy Samberg; Annette Bening; Florence Pugh; Alia Shawkat
- Cinematography: Nigel Bluck
- Production company: Party Over Here
- Distributed by: Focus Features (United States); Universal Pictures (International)
- Country: United States
- Language: English

42.6 Years is an upcoming American science fiction romantic comedy film directed by Michael Schwartz with a script by Seth Reiss. The film is set to star Andy Samberg, Annette Bening, Florence Pugh, and Alia Shawkat.

== Premise ==
After being cryogenically frozen for 42.6 years, a young man attempts to reconnect with his girlfriend who has lived a full life without him.

== Cast ==
- Andy Samberg as Ben
- Annette Bening as Ruthie
  - Florence Pugh as young Ruthie
- Alia Shawkat

== Production ==
Seth Reiss's script for 42.6 Years, landed on the 2022 Black List for best unproduced screenplays. It was based on an original idea by Andy Samberg, who later developed the story with Reiss. In February 2023, it was announced that Craig Gillespie would direct the film, with Samberg starring opposite Jean Smart; Amazon MGM Studios would distribute.

Three years later, in March 2026, it was announced that Michael Schwartz would be taking over the role of director, with Gillespie remaining on as producer, whilst Annette Bening would replace Smart; Focus Features would distribute.

Production began in Jersey City and New York City in May 2026. Stand in casting calls revealed that Alia Shawkat would be joining the film in an undisclosed role. Florence Pugh was revealed to have joined the cast in June 2026.
