= Ella Thomas =

Eritrean-American actress and film producer (born 1981)

Ella A. Thomas
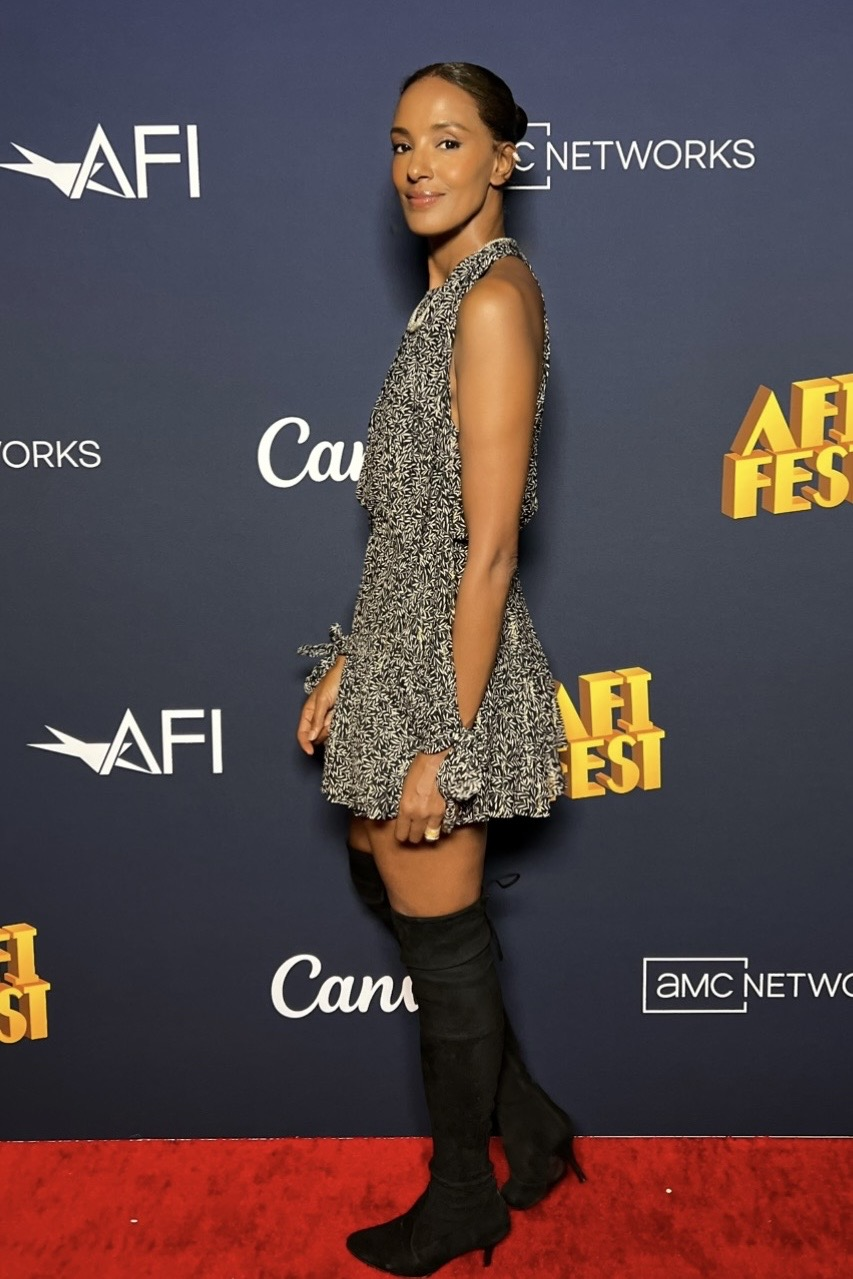
- Ella A. Thomas in 2026
- Born: August 15, 1981 (age 45); Asmara, Ethiopia
- Occupations: Actress, film producer, model
- Years active: 2006–present
- Website: www.officialellathomas.com

Ella A. Thomas (born August 15, 1981) is an Eritrean-American actress, model, and film producer. She is known for her recurring roles on the television series Ballers and Ice as well as her appearances in studio and independent feature films.

== Early life and education ==
Thomas was born in Asmara to an Eritrean mother and an American Air Force officer. During her childhood, her family relocated to Germany, where they settled in the town of Kindsbach and she attended a local German school. Thomas became fluent in both English and German, and also studied French and Tigrinya.

== Career ==
=== Modeling ===
Thomas began her career as a commercial and editorial model. She has been featured in editorial spreads for Vogue, Glamour, and ELLE. Her print advertising work includes campaigns for Gap, Tiffany & Co., and Levi's. She is represented by Wilhelmina Models.

=== Film ===
Thomas made her early feature film appearances in the Touchstone/Disney sci-fi thriller Surrogates (2009) opposite Bruce Willis. In 2016, she portrayed author and playwright Lorraine Hansberry in the biographical drama Nina alongside Zoe Saldaña.

In 2023, she starred as Sarah Magee opposite Garrett Hedlund in the Lionsgate action-thriller Desperation Road. The following year, she appeared as Naya in the Searchlight Pictures dark comedy Nightbitch (2024), directed by Marielle Heller and starring Amy Adams, which premiered at the Toronto International Film Festival.

Through her production banner, Roaring Queen Films, Thomas expanded her work into independent film packaging and development, serving as a writer, producer, and lead actress for the drama feature Know Mercy (2025).

=== Television ===
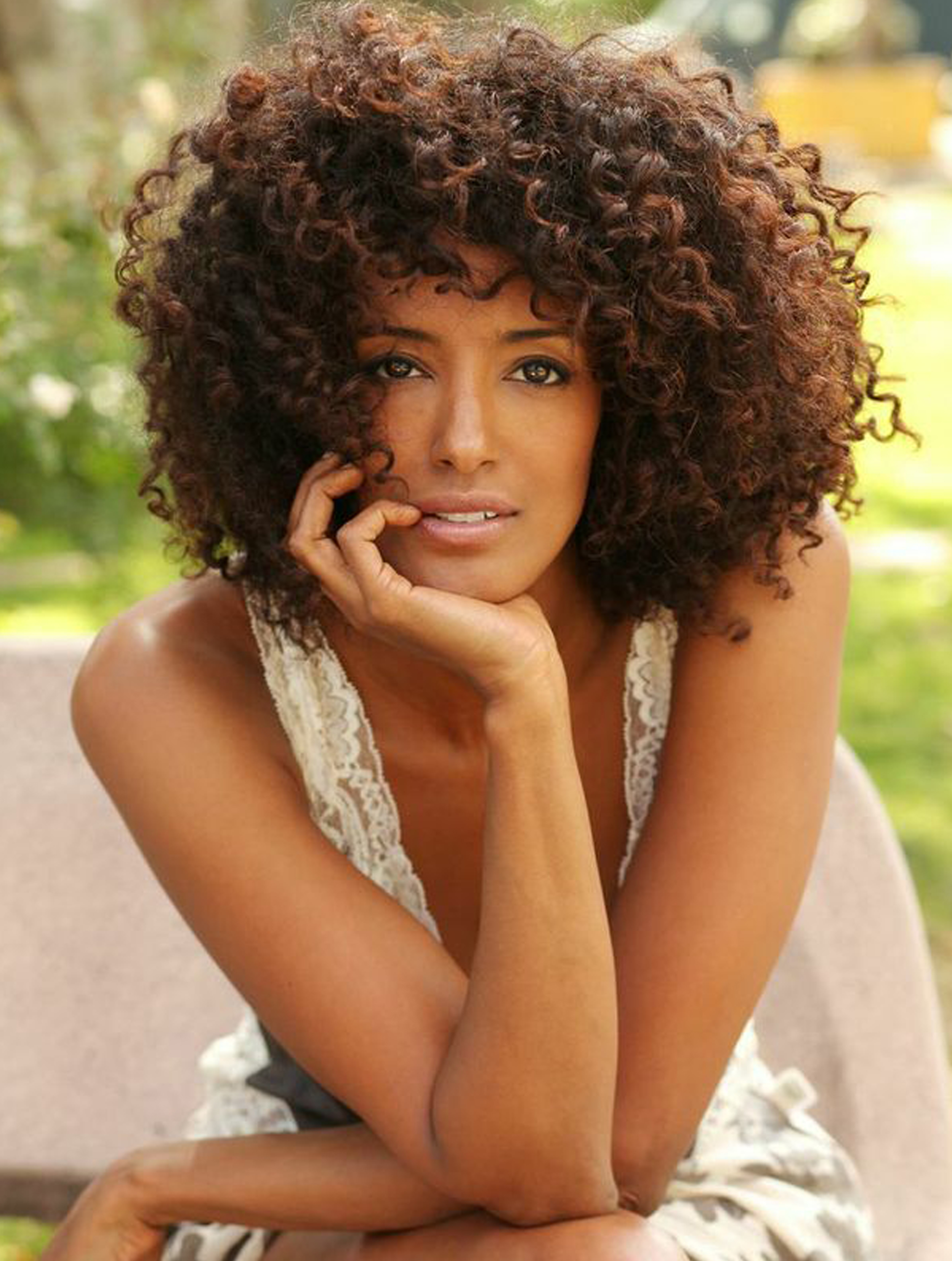
Thomas in 2013

Thomas has held several recurring and main character roles across broadcast and premium television networks:

- NCIS: Los Angeles (CBS) – Portrayed the recurring character Jada Khaled across multiple seasons.
- Ballers (HBO) – Played the recurring character Kara Cooley opposite Dwayne Johnson.
- Ice (Audience Network) – Starred as a series regular in the main role of Lala Agabaria under the direction of Antoine Fuqua.
- Ten Days in the Valley (ABC) – Recurred as Detective Isabel Knight opposite Kyra Sedgwick.
- Mistresses (ABC) – Appeared in a prominent multi-episode story arc as Jackie during season 4.
