= Rebirth (2016 film) =

- Film poster
- Directed by: Karl Mueller
- Written by: Karl Mueller
- Produced by: Ross M. Dinerstein; Samantha Housman
- Starring: Fran Kranz; Adam Goldberg; Nicky Whelan; Kat Foster; Andrew J. West; Eric Ladin; Agung Bagus; Steve Agee; Skya Chanadet; Tim Malooly; Burton Ritchie; Karole Foreman; Anthony Hill; Justin H. Min; Chloe Stearns; Joe Antony; Alysa Ferra; T.W Leshner
- Cinematography: Benji Bakshi
- Edited by: Saul Herckis
- Music by: Jonathan Snipes
- Production company: Campfire
- Distributed by: Netflix
- Release dates: April 17, 2016 (Tribeca Film Festival); July 15, 2016 (Worldwide)
- Running time: 101 minutes
- Country: United States
- Language: English

Rebirth is a 2016 American thriller film written and directed by Karl Mueller. The film stars Fran Kranz, Adam Goldberg, Nicky Whelan, Kat Foster, Andrew J. West and Eric Ladin. The film was released on July 15, 2016, on Netflix.

== Plot ==
Kyle Madison, a suburban husband and father employed by a bank, is unexpectedly visited by Zack, an estranged college friend. Zack invites him to a secretive self-improvement retreat called Rebirth but refuses to explain its purpose. After watching enthusiastic testimonials, Kyle accepts and is transported blindfolded to a derelict industrial complex, only after being challenged by a woman who told him she didn't think he was ready for the experience.

Following an intimidating reception by Rebirth veteran Ray, Kyle enters a celebratory hall where participants claim Rebirth has no leaders or spectators and that anyone may leave. A dance party begins in the room, but Naomi, the same woman from the bus, tells him he should leave. He follows her out of the room and asks her questions about the purpose of Rebirth and why she singled him out, to which she responds with her own questions. Kyle then passes through various disturbing rooms. In one an aggressive group-therapy leader humiliates and strikes him while displaying information taken from his telephone, including family photographs, addresses, house plans, and banking passwords. In a pillow-covered “honesty” circle, Gabe encourages several women to express their attraction to Kyle, kiss him, and proposition him. Hearing cries behind another door, Kyle discovers Zack partially unclothed, restrained, and apparently tortured. Although Zack and Naomi insist the experience is voluntary, Kyle frees him.

Convinced Rebirth has drugged Zack and stolen their money, Kyle holds the eccentric masseuse Jesse at knifepoint and demands an exit. Zack enters the darkened “Wish Room,” where Kyle loses him amid sexual noises and chanting. Kyle follows and emerges into the main hall, where the participants reveal that the danger, Zack's imprisonment, and Jesse's peril were staged as Kyle's personalized Rebirth. Kyle refuses to record a testimonial and leaves.

At home, Kyle discovers that Rebirth has drained his savings and accessed his personal information and virtually every room of his house filled with Rebirth products and photos, including images of women kissing Kyle during the retreat. He finds Zack in his bathtub, who explains that that the purpose of Rebirth was to get him to "wake up", to stop making decisions solely to please others, and to be honest with himself and with others about who he is and what he wants. Zack then "requests" a transfer of money from Kyle's employer, using the photographs, stolen data, missing money, and the imminent arrival of Kyle's family, who Zack greets and offers Kool-Aid to, as blackmail. Kyle acknowledges that the ordeal forced him to act decisively and was transformative and seems to retroactively have mixed feelings about the experience, and is coerced to access his employer's bank account for a Rebirth “donation” and record a testimonial for the Rebirth organization.

A promotional video during the closing credits shows Kyle, his wife, Zack, and other participants several years later, all seemingly living happy and fulfilling lives after their Rebirth experiences. Kyle credits Rebirth with changing his previously unhappy life and now directs its media operation, while the organization advertises retreats and branded products.

== Cast ==
- Fran Kranz as Kyle
- Adam Goldberg as Zack
- Nicky Whelan as Naomi
- Kat Foster as Mary
- Andrew J. West as J.R.
- Eric Ladin as Todd
- Steve Agee as Ray
- Luis Gerardo Méndez as Doctor
- Pat Healy as Jesse
- Harry Hamlin as Gabe
- Kevin Bigley as Chad
- Tom Wright as The Expert
- Aynsley Bubbico as Abby
- Fabianne Therese as Betty
- Nathalie Autumn Bennett as Rhonda
- Kevin Burns as Meth
- Sheryl Lee as Air
- Agung Bagus as Doctor 2
- Justin H. Min as Intern 2
- Anthony Hill as Nate
- T. W. Leshner as Jock Guy
- Chloe Stearns as Maggie

== Release ==
The film premiered at the Tribeca Film Festival on April 17, 2016. The film was released on July 15, 2016, on Netflix.
