= Nadine Crocker =

American actress and filmmaker

- Born: October 28, 1988 (age 37); Nashville, Tennessee, U.S.
- Citizenship: American
- Occupations: Actress, filmmaker
- Children: 1

Nadine Crocker (born October 28, 1988) is an American actress and filmmaker. She directed the feature films Continue (2022) and Desperation Road (2023), also writing the screenplay of the former.

Crocker was born in Nashville. Her father is Bob Crocker. She is from Fresno, California; she attended Clovis West High School.

== Filmography ==
=== As director ===
- Continue (2022)
- Desperation Road (2023)

=== As film actress ===
Year	Title	Role	Notes
2008	Deadgirl	Student	
2010	High School	Emily Tooms	
2011	The Amityville Haunting	Lori Benson	
2011	Geezas	Tyler	
2012	Some Guy Who Kills People	Candace	
2012	The Undercard	Dylan	Short film
2013	Platonic Solid	Cameron	Short film
2015	Rodeo & Juliet	Juliet Rogers	
2016	Cabin Fever	Marcy	
2016	ToY	Zoe	
2017	Postcolonial Nostalgia	Ashley	Short film
2018	Take the Shot, Tom	Kate	Short film
2019	Joy Division - Interzone	Unknown	Short film
2022	Continue	Dean	

=== As television actress ===
Year	Title	Role	Notes
2008	Hannah Montana	Pretty Girl	1 episode
2009	Rockville USA	Tallulah	1 episode
2009-2010	10 Things I Hate About You	Ivy/Lexie Greenberg	2 episodes
2010	No Ordinary Family	Lindsay	1 episode
2011	Castle	Charlotte Rosenberg	1 episode
2016	Supergirl	Scorcher	1 episode
