= Continue (film) =

2022 film by Nadine Crocker

- Theatrical release poster
- Directed by: Nadine Crocker
- Written by: Nadine Crocker
- Produced by: Nadine Crocker; Jay Seals; Anthony Caravella
- Starring: Nadine Crocker; Shiloh Fernandez; Lio Tipton; Kat Foster; Annapurna Sriram; Dale Dickey; Emily Deschanel
- Cinematography: Sy Turnbull
- Edited by: Jing Han
- Music by: Asaf Sagiv; Haim Mazar
- Production companies: Grindstone Entertainment Group; Hopeful Romantix Productions
- Distributed by: Lionsgate
- Release dates: August 20, 2022 (Cinequest); September 6, 2024 (United States)
- Running time: 118 minutes
- Country: United States
- Language: English

Continue (stylized as cont;nue) is a 2022 American psychological drama film written and directed by Nadine Crocker. It stars Crocker, Shiloh Fernandez, Lio Tipton, Kat Foster, Annapurna Sriram, Dale Dickey, and Emily Deschanel.

== Plot ==
A girl suffering from depression is forced to get her life together when she is taken involuntarily to a mental institution after trying to follow in her fathers footsteps, but failing her suicide attempt. She finds unlikely friends, unwavering love, and a life she never imagined possible for a girl like her. All to find out some decisions can't be undone. You only get one life.

== Cast ==
- Nadine Crocker as Dean
- Shiloh Fernandez as Trenton
- Lio Tipton as Bria
- Anthony Caravella as Jackson
- Emily Deschanel as Janet
- Annapurna Sriram as Taryn
- Kat Foster as Bennett
- Dale Dickey as Nurse Love
- Jay Seals as Carter

== Release ==
The film was released at the Cinequest Film & Creativity Festival on August 20, 2022. It was released in the United States on September 6, 2024.

== Reception ==
On the review aggregator website Rotten Tomatoes, 94% of 16 critics' reviews are positive, with an average rating of 7.7/10.

Rob Rector of Film Threat rated the film a 9 out of 10. Randy Myers of The Mercury News gave the film a positive review and wrote, "In this uncompromising depiction of coming back after a suicide attempt, actor/writer Nadine Crocker takes us on a brutal odyssey that covers sensitive topics with candor."
