= Desperation Road =

2023 film by Nadine Crocker

- Official release poster
- Directed by: Nadine Crocker
- Screenplay by: Michael Farris Smith
- Based on: Desperation Road by Michael Farris Smith
- Produced by: Cassian Elwes; Nadine Crocker; Michael Farris Smith; Paul Robarts
- Starring: Garrett Hedlund; Willa Fitzgerald; Ryan Hurst; Mel Gibson
- Cinematography: Sy Turnbull
- Edited by: Jing Han
- Music by: Haim Mazar
- Production companies: Grindstone Entertainment Group; Capstone Global
- Distributed by: Lionsgate
- Release date: October 6, 2023
- Running time: 112 minutes
- Country: United States
- Language: English

Desperation Road is a 2023 American action thriller film written by Michael Farris Smith, directed by Nadine Crocker and starring Garrett Hedlund and Mel Gibson. It is based on the novel of the same name by Smith.

== Plot ==
Maben, a destitute single mother, is traveling through rural Mississippi with her young daughter Analee. She takes a room in a motel at a truck stop and, desperate for cash, considers soliciting truckers but loses her nerve. A local sheriff’s deputy spots her outside, assumes she is a sex worker, and takes her to an isolated location, where he rapes her and then calls two friends to join him. Before they arrive, Maben grabs his pistol and shoots him dead, then flees with the gun after picking the spent cartridges up off the ground.

Russell Gaines is released from prison after serving seven years for a drunk-driving accident that killed a young man named Jason. Stepping off a bus, he is ambushed and beaten by Jason's brothers, Larry and Walt, who warn him that his debt to them is not settled. Russell visits his father, Mitchell, on his farm and meets Mitchell's partner, Consuela. Mitchell gives Russell the keys to a house he owns in town; he invites Russell to stay at the farm until Larry and Walt calm down, but Russell fears they would bring trouble to Mitchell. While out driving, he comes across a police roadblock at the scene of the shooting, where he reconnects with his old friend Boyd, now a deputy in the same force as the dead man.

Maben takes refuge at a women's shelter and gets work at a nearby bar, but is forced to flee with Analee when a staff member at the shelter discovers the gun hidden in her belongings. Soon after, Maben comes across Russell and holds him at gunpoint, forcing him to drive her and Analee away.

After hearing Maben’s story and realizing that she was Jason’s lover at the time of his death, Russell agrees to shelter them at his father's farm. He later admits his role in Jason’s death to Maben and apologizes to her for it; he also learns that Jason was Analee’s father. At his suggestion, she throws the gun away in a lake near the farm, although she keeps the spent cartridges; Russell eventually takes them from her. Maben and Analee form a bond with Russell, Mitchell and Consuela.

Consumed by grief and alcoholism, Larry grows increasingly erratic in his pursuit of revenge against Russell; he also repeatedly violates a restraining order meant to protect his wife, Dana, and son, Cody, from him. After Larry tries and fails to commit suicide, he shows up at Russell’s house; in a violent confrontation, he injures Maben with a crowbar and is about to kill Russell when Mitchell intervenes by shooting him. Larry dies soon after in a reckless final drive that ends when he crashes into a police barricade. Russell rushes Maben to the hospital.

Boyd, who has been investigating the dead deputy's murder, suspects Maben. Russell explains Maben’s story to him and gives him the spent cartridges. Boyd plants them in Larry's wrecked car to clear Maben of suspicion. Once Maben recovers from her injury, she and Analee settle permanently on the farm and become part of the family.

== Cast ==
- Garrett Hedlund as Russell
- Willa Fitzgerald as Maben
- Ryan Hurst as Larry
- Woody McClain as Boyd
- Mel Gibson as Mitchell
- Pyper Braun as Analee
- Bonita Elery as Brenda
- Katy Bodenhamer as Lacey
- Paulina Gálvez as Consuela
- Shiloh Fernandez as Clint
- Kat Foster as Dana
- Ella Thomas as Sarah

== Production ==
In October 2022, it was announced that Garrett Hedlund and Mel Gibson were cast in the film. In November 2022, it was announced that Willa Fitzgerald was cast in the film. Later it was also announced that Kat Foster was cast in the film. as well as Ella Thomas.

In February 2023, a first-look image from the film was revealed, confirming production had occurred.

== Release ==
Desperation Road was released on October 6, 2023, in select theaters and digital format.

== Reception ==
On the review aggregator website Rotten Tomatoes, 64% of 14 critics' reviews are positive, with an average rating of 7/10.
