= Spoonful of Sugar (film) =

- Promotional release poster
- Directed by: Mercedes Bryce Morgan
- Written by: Leah Saint Marie
- Produced by: Katrina Kudlick; Natalie Metzger; Matt Miller
- Starring: Morgan Saylor; Kat Foster; Danilo Crovetti; Myko Olivier; Keith Powell
- Cinematography: Nick Matthews
- Edited by: Anjoum Agrama
- Music by: Robert Allaire
- Production company: Vanishing Angle
- Distributed by: Shudder
- Release dates: 2022 (film festivals); March 2, 2023 (streaming)
- Running time: 94 minutes
- Country: United States
- Language: English

Spoonful of Sugar is a 2022 American horror thriller film that was directed by Mercedes Bryce Morgan, based on a script written by Leah Saint Marie. It stars Morgan Saylor, Kat Foster, Danilo Crovetti, Myko Olivier and Keith Powell. The film centers on a college student who takes on a job caring for a sickly child, only for things to go horribly wrong when she offers him some of her own medication.

== Plot ==
Millicent is a college student who grew up in the foster care system, where she experienced years of sexual abuse at the hands of several foster fathers. She decides to take some time away from school in order to work on her thesis as well as take part in a treatment program that utilizes microdoses of LSD. Millicent takes a job babysitting Johnny Michaels, a nonverbal young boy with allergies so severe that he must wear an astronaut-esque suit to keep him safe.

Once in the home Millicent quickly discovers that Johnny's home life is not perfect, as his father Jacob is prone to philandering while his mother Rebecca is extremely intent on appearing as the perfect mother. As such, Millicent decides that she will take over Rebecca's role and become the perfect mother for Johnny. She endears herself to Johnny after teaching him how to skin several animals he had killed and buried in his back yard. Millicent also begins dosing Johnny with LSD. He eventually calls Millicent "mommy," his first spoken word, infuriating Rebecca. She also begins an affair with Jacob, which is witnessed by Johnny, who creates several sketches of the sexual interlude. While this is going on, Millicent flips through her journal, where she details how she has murdered all of the foster fathers who had sexually abused her.

Rebecca discovers the affair through the drawings and confronts Millicent, who attacks her and leaves to find Jacob. She finds him and pleads for him to leave his wife, but Jacob refuses. While she is gone, Johnny attacks Rebecca, as Millicent had previously told him to kill his mother. Millicent returns and is attacked by Rebecca and Johnny, the latter of whom stabs Millicent to death. The film ends with the reveal that this was not Johnny's first murder and that his parents have covered up all of the prior deaths to protect their son - and that they will continue to do so.

== Cast ==
- Morgan Saylor as Millicent
- Kat Foster as Rebecca Michaels
- Danilo Crovetti as Johnny Michaels
- Myko Olivier as Jacob Michaels
- Keith Powell as Dr. Welsh
- David Yow as Roger
- Christiana Montoya as Little Girl
- Shon Wilson as Esther
- Dave Snyder as Hip White Man
- Laura Coover as Julia
- Stephanie Erb as Sara

== Release ==
Spoonful of Sugar premiered on internet streaming service Shudder as one of its Shudder Originals on March 2, 2023. Prior to this the movie had been screened at several film festivals during 2022, including Fantastic Fest.

== Reception ==
On the review aggregator website Rotten Tomatoes, 50% of 12 critics' reviews are positive.

Matt Donato of Slash Film rated it 7/10 writing that "if you love a double-edged fable that goes from bad to worse to catastrophic, keep an eye out for Spoonful of Sugar." Writing for Starburst magazine, John Townsend said that "in the end, it’s mostly just unpleasant characters doing unpleasant things to each other."

The Los Angeles Times's Noel Murray was more critical, as they felt "There’s not quite enough plot in Spoonful of Sugar to fill its running time, though the performances are so lively and director Morgan’s imagery so vivid that the picture is never dull. The film works best when it makes the least sense."
