= Kat Foster =

American actress

- Born: Oakland, California, U.S.
- Occupation: Actress
- Years active: 2001–present
- Spouse: Jim Hustead
- Children: 2

Kat Foster is an American stage and screen actress known for her roles in the TV series 'Til Death, The Unusuals, Your Family or Mine, The Goodwin Games and Jean-Claude Van Johnson among others. She has also starred in films including Rebirth (2016), Spoonful of Sugar (2022), and Fear the Night (2023), among others.

== Early life and education ==
Foster was born in Oakland, California and graduated from The College Preparatory School. A classically trained dramatic actress, Foster studied acting at the New York University Tisch School of the Arts. She also trained at the Royal Academy of Dramatic Art in London.

== Career ==
Foster has performed in many off-Broadway and regional productions, including "The Democracy Project" with Naked Angels, King of Shadows, Small Craft Warnings, Sundown and Tempest among others.

Her past TV appearances include roles on Weeds, Family Guy, The Book of Daniel, Law & Order, 'Til Death, Law & Order: Criminal Intent, Royal Pains, and Law & Order: Special Victims Unit. In addition, she starred with Bobby Cannavale and Donnie Wahlberg in the NBC pilot NY-70, a stylized police show set in the 1970s, and in the CBS pilot Webster Report, about a reluctant New York detective with Cannavale and Stanley Tucci. She has also starred in Amy Miller Gross’ Accommodations, and Amazon series Jean-Claude Van Johnson opposite Jean-Claude Van Damme. In 2020, she starred in the film First One In and in 2022, she appeared in Nadine Crocker's film Desperation Road. She has also appeared in the films Susie Searches and Continue and played a role in the limited Starz series Gaslit.

== Awards ==
Foster was awarded Best Actress for her performance in "Final Countdown" at the 2003 New York International Fringe Festival.

== Personal life ==
Foster's father managed bands. As a child, she danced in The Nutcracker with the San Francisco Ballet. She is married to Jim Hustead and has two daughters.

== Filmography ==
=== Film ===
Year	Title	Role	Notes
2011	I am Not A Moose	Micaela	Short Film
2012	The Newlymovedins	Kat	Short Film
2012	Till It Gets Weird	Kerry	Short Film
2015	The Dramatics: A Comedy	Katie	Short Film
2015	The Love Inside	Erica	
2015	A Year and Change	Cindy	
2016	Rebirth	Mary	
2018	Accommodations	Edie Somner	
2020	First One In	Madi	
2022	Spoonful of Sugar (film)	Rebecca	
2022	Desperation Road	Dana	
2022	Gasoline Alley (2022 film)	Christine	
2022	Continue	Bennett	
2022	Susie Searches	Dianne Seleck	
2023	Fear the Night	Beth	

=== Television ===
Year	Title	Role	Notes
2001	The Education of Max Bickford	Jackie Kramer	Episode: "Herding Cats"
2005	Law & Order: Criminal Intent	Kelly West	Episode: "The Unblinking Eye"
2005	Law & Order	Justine	Episode: "Acid"
2005	N.Y.-70	A.D.A. Rachel Abramowitz	TV movie
2006	The Book of Daniel	Michelle Hedley	Episode: "Forgiveness"
2006–2008	'Til Death	Steph Woodcock	39 episodes
2008 & 2013	Family Guy	Carolyn	2 episodes
2009	Eva Adams	Grace Wainright	TV movie
2009	The Unusuals	Nicole Brandt	6 episodes
2010	The Good Wife	Emily Tartan	Episode: "Infamy"
2010	Law & Order: Special Victims Unit	Sarah Hoyt	2 episodes
2010	In Security	Nikki	TV movie
2011–2012	Weeds	Kiku / Kiki	6 episodes
2012	Royal Pains	Harper Cummings	6 episodes
2012	Let It Go	Gracie	TV movie
2012–2014	Franklin & Bash	Wendy Cowell / Wendy McQuaid	3 episodes
2013	The Goodwin Games	Lucinda	7 episodes
2013	Untitled Tad Quill Project	Allie	TV movie
2014	Bad Teacher	Brie	6 episodes
2015	Your Family or Mine	Kelli Weston	10 episodes
2016–2017	Jean-Claude Van Johnson	Vanessa	6 episodes
2017	Me, Myself & I	Lauren	Episode: "The First Step"
2017	Micah the Asshole Ghost	Sue	TV movie
2018	Barry	Liv	Episode: "Chapter Three: Make the Unsafe Choice"
2021	CSI: Vegas	Nora Cross	Recurring
2022	The Rookie	Casey Fox	2 episodes
2022	Gaslit	Barbara Walters	3 episodes

=== Video games ===
Year	Title	Role	Notes
2006	Family Guy Video Game!	Carolyn	Voice
