= Nick (novel) =

2021 novel by Michael Farris Smith

- First edition cover
- Author: Michael Farris Smith
- Audio read by: Robert Petkoff
- Language: English
- Genre: Historical novel; prequel
- Publisher: Little, Brown and Company
- Publication date: January 5, 2021
- Publication place: United States
- Media type: Print (hardcover), e-book, audio
- Pages: 304
- ISBN: 978-0-316-52976-1 (hardcover)
- OCLC: 1228119058
- Dewey Decimal: 813/.6
- Followed by: The Great Gatsby

Nick is a 2021 novel by American writer Michael Farris Smith. It is his sixth novel and was published on January 5, 2021 by Little, Brown and Company. It is a work of fan fiction and prequel to F. Scott Fitzgerald's landmark 1925 novel The Great Gatsby.

== Synopsis ==
Nick centers on the narrator of The Great Gatsby, Nick Carraway, in the years before the events of Fitzgerald's novel. It follows Nick Carraway as a soldier in World War I, his detours in Paris, and his time in New Orleans before his move up to Long Island.

== Background ==
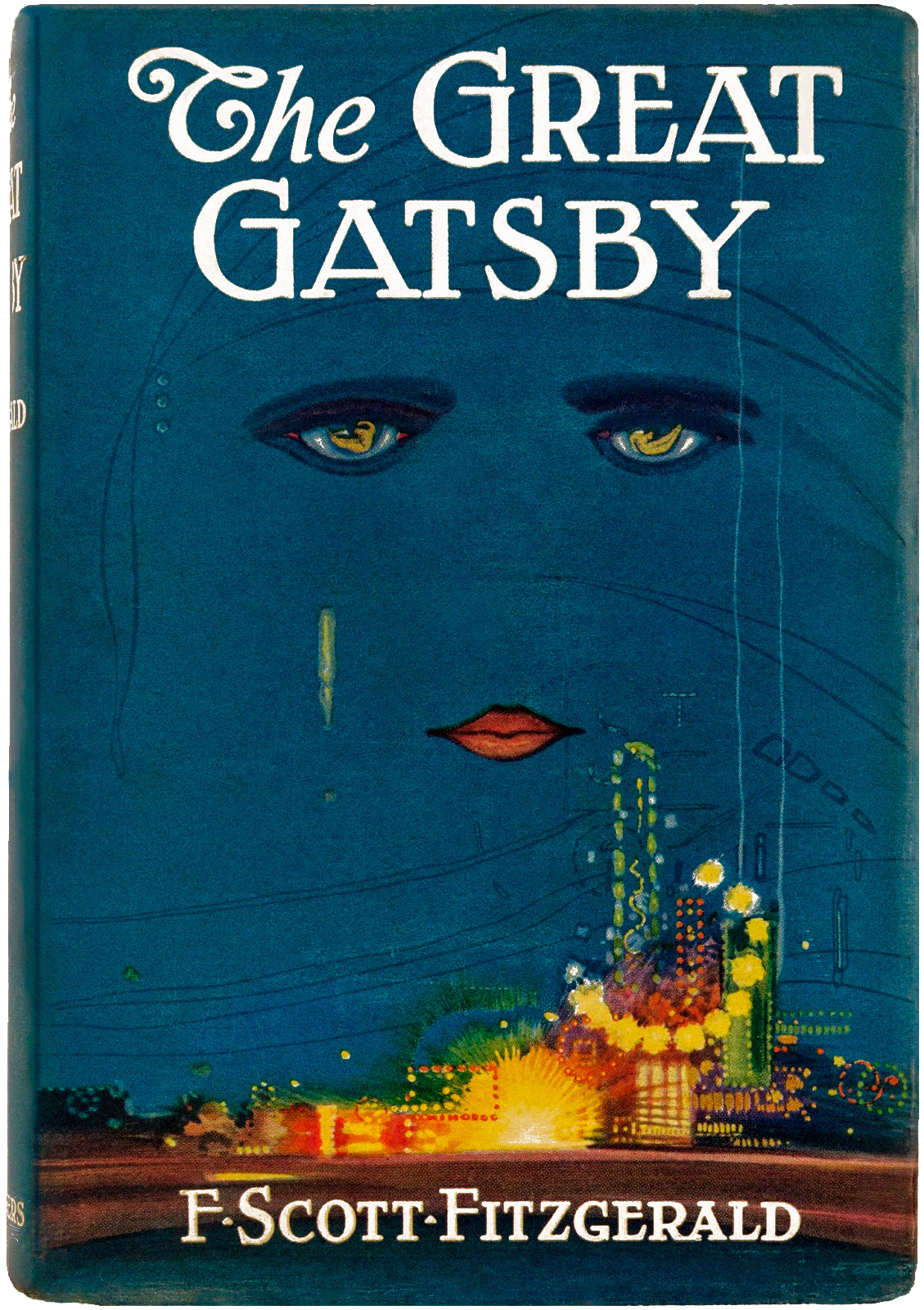
The Great Gatsby

Smith first read The Great Gatsby as a high school student, but he did not fully understand it at the time. In 2014, after living in Europe, Smith reread the novel for the first time in several years. He came to identify with its narrator Nick Carraway and was drawn to Carraway's sense of detachment. He felt emotionally compelled to write a prequel novel, despite the "literary weight" of doing so and the inevitable public reaction. Smith wrote the novel in 2014 and 2015, and did not once take into consideration any potential copyright issues. He wrote it in secret, telling neither his agent nor his editor. In 2015, ten months after Smith began writing the novel, he sent in a completed manuscript. Smith was promptly informed that he would be required to wait until 2021 to publish it due to the original work's existing copyright. The Great Gatsby's U.S. copyright expired on January 1, 2021, when all works published in 1925 entered the public domain in the United States.

== Reception ==
Kirkus Reviews called Nick a "compelling character study." In his review for The New York Times, Ben Fountain called it an "exemplary novel" with a "classic American sound" and praised Smith's unique rendering of Nick Carraway. In her review for the New York Journal of Books, Claire Fullerton praised the book for developing Carraway's backstory with an "unvarnished depth of experience" and creating a "profound" impact and resonance. Fullerton also described the novel as being a watershed moment for Farris Smith as an author, explaining that with Nick his "clear, direct, and economic voice" would advance from an acquired taste to a wider readership that understands him as a "fearless writer who transcends literary limits", concluding, "Once you attune yourself to the rhythm of Farris Smith's voice, you'll follow him anywhere." In a favorable review for Town & Country, Sadie Stein wrote, "What used to seem a travesty—imposing one's own view on a classic work—now seems like an act of generosity."

Publishers Weekly praised the "striking imagery" of the war chapters, but felt the novel ultimately did not provide any deeper understanding of Nick Carraway. Mark Athitakis of the Los Angeles Times agreed, criticizing the novel as devolving into a melodrama and reprocessing Nick Carraway rather than clarifying his character. Ron Charles of The Washington Post felt the novel failed to expand on the original story and criticized its second half for withdrawing Nick's perspective too far and leaving readers with "noir caricatures and their lurid spat."
