= Michael Farris Smith =

American writer

- Born: 1969 or 1970 (age 55–56); McComb, Mississippi, U.S.
- Education: South Pike High School; Parklane Academy
- Alma mater: Southwest Mississippi Community College; Mississippi State University (BA); William Carey College (MEd); University of Southern Mississippi (PhD)
- Occupation: Writer
- Writing career
- Language: English
- Years active: 2011–present
- Genres: Novels; short fiction; essays
- Notable work: Rivers (2013); Desperation Road (2017); Nick (2021)
- Website: www.michaelfarrissmith.com

Michael Farris Smith is an American writer from Mississippi. As of 2025, Smith has published eight novels: The Hands of Strangers (2011), Rivers (2013), Desperation Road (2017), The Fighter (2018), Blackwood (2020), Nick (2021), Salvage This World (2023), and Lay Your Armor Down (2025).

== Early life and education ==
Michael Farris Smith was born in McComb, Mississippi. He was raised in a deeply religious family; Smith's father was a Southern Baptist minister. His family moved around many times when he was young, eventually settling in Magnolia, Mississippi. Smith attended South Pike High School and graduated from Parklane Academy in 1988. He played baseball at Southwest Mississippi Community College. He earned a B.A. from Mississippi State University, an M.Ed. from William Carey College and a Ph.D. from the University of Southern Mississippi. After graduating from Mississippi State, Smith spent several years living abroad in Switzerland and France. He began writing fiction while studying at the University of Southern Mississippi's Center for Writers. Smith taught at Auburn University and at Mississippi University for Women, where he was an associate professor of English.

== Career ==
=== The Hands of Strangers (2011) ===
In early 2011, Smith's debut work, The Hands of Strangers, was published by the Mint Hill Books imprint of the Charlotte-based publisher Main Street Rag Publishing. It is a novella set in Paris and focuses on Jon and Estelle, whose nine-year-old daughter Jennifer is kidnapped during a class field trip at the Musée d'Orsay. In its starred review, Publishers Weekly wrote, "Smith captures the essence of the helpless, making more of an impact than most novels three times its size."

=== Rivers (2013) ===
In September 2013, Smith's first full-length novel, Rivers, was published by Simon & Schuster. Rivers is set in post-Hurricane Katrina Mississippi in the distant future as a series of violent storms devastate the state's southern Gulf Coast. It has been described both as post-apocalyptic fiction and dystopian fiction. In its starred review, Kirkus Reviews praised Smith's "expertly executed" example of a post-apocalyptic society and the novel's "compelling" plot; the publication also called Smith's prose "lush, descriptive and even beautiful." In her review for The Washington Post, novelist Mary Doria Russell praised Smith's realistic character development and his "honed prose" for building tension. Russell, however, criticized the novel for being too short and called its ending a "surprising disappointment." The New York Times praised Smith's "incantatory prose" for powering the narrative.

Rivers was awarded the 2014 Mississippi Authors Award for Fiction by the Mississippi Library Association.

=== Desperation Road (2017) ===
Smith's third novel, Desperation Road, was published in February 2017 by Lee Boudreaux Books, an imprint of Little, Brown and Company. Set in Mississippi, it follows Russell Gaines, who is released from Mississippi State Penitentiary after serving an eleven-year sentence. As he travels back to his hometown of McComb, his path intertwines with that of Maben Jones. Jones, a homeless woman and former addict, is searching for a life for her and her young daughter Annalee. When a deputy sheriff attempts to rape Maben, she shoots and kills him. In its starred review, Kirkus Reviews wrote, "Smith writes shapely prose and sharp dialogue and everywhere displays an acute sense of the moments and pain that can define lives in a small town."

Desperation Road was a finalist for the 2018 Southern Book Prize. It was also longlisted for the 2017 Gold Dagger in the United Kingdom. The novel's French translation was a finalist for the 2017 Grand prix des lectrices de Elle. A film adaptation of the same name written by Smith and starring Garrett Hedlund and Mel Gibson was released in 2023.

=== The Fighter (2018) ===
Smith's fourth novel, The Fighter, was published in March 2018 by Little, Brown and Company.

The Fighter was adapted into a film entitled Rumble Through the Dark (2023), directed by brothers Parker and Graham Phillips and produced by Cassian Elwes. Smith wrote the screenplay adaptation of the novel.

=== Blackwood (2020) ===
Smith's fifth novel, Blackwood, was published in March 2020 by Little, Brown and Company.

Blackwood was included on NPR's "Best Books of 2020" list, The Times's "Best fiction books of the year 2020" list, and The Atlanta Journal-Constitution's "10 best Southern books of 2020" list.

=== Nick (2021) ===
Smith's sixth novel, Nick, was published on January 5, 2021, by Little, Brown and Company. It is a prequel to The Great Gatsby, F. Scott Fitzgerald's landmark 1925 novel. The Great Gatsby's U.S. copyright expired on January 1, 2021, when all works published in 1925 entered the public domain in the United States. Nick centers on the narrator of The Great Gatsby, Nick Carraway, in the years before the events of Fitzgerald's novel. It follows Nick Carraway as a soldier in World War I, his detours in Paris, and his time in New Orleans before his move up to Long Island. Kirkus Reviews called Nick a "compelling character study." In his review for The New York Times, Ben Fountain called it an "exemplary novel" with a "classic American sound" and praised Smith's unique rendering of Nick Carraway. Publishers Weekly praised the "striking imagery" of the war chapters, but felt the novel ultimately did not provide any deeper understand of Nick Carraway. The Los Angeles Times agreed, criticizing the novel as devolving into a melodrama and reprocessing Nick Carraway rather than clarifying his character. Ron Charles of The Washington Post felt the novel failed to expand on the original story, and criticized its second half for withdrawing Nick's perspective too far and leaving readers with "noir caricatures and their lurid spat."

=== Salvage This World (2023) ===
Smith's seventh novel, Salvage This World, was published on April 23, 2023, by Little, Brown and Company. The book is set in an uncertain time in the future when the Mississippi Gulf Coast has become all but uninhabitable because of the effects of climate change. The Gulf hurricane season, once confined to the period of June through November, now never ends. The novel follows Jessie, a young mother, and her child, as they come home to see her ghost-haunted father, Wade. Jobs are few and resources fewer. The Gulf Coast's remaining inhabitants are primarily people who are too poor to leave and grifters who come to prey on them. One of those grifters is Elser, a con woman who leads a traveling tent revival she has dubbed the Temple of Pain and Glory. In his review for The New York Times, John Brandon said the book portrays a "a Deep South where hospitality feels impossible, from which everyone with means and sense has departed, a society where any vehicle on the road might have a bound (if alive) or bagged (if dead) human as its cargo."

=== Lay Your Armor Down (2025) ===
Smith's eighth novel is a companion story to Salvage This World, inhabiting the same pre-Rivers hurricane ridden landscape. The novel follows two men, who discover a young girl in an abandoned church cellar. The girl is being hunted because it is believed she can control the weather. The novel was hailed as "brutally brilliant" by the Sun Sentinel and Kirkus Reviews (in a starred-review) described it as an "eerie, transfixing page-turner". Lay Your Armor Down was named on of NPR's Best Books of the Year, the second time Smith has earned this distinction for one of his novels (Blackwood).

=== Short fiction ===
Smith's short fiction has twice been nominated for a Pushcart Prize.

=== Michael Farris Smith & The Smokes ===
In 2024, Farris released Lostville, the debut EP from Michael Farris Smith & The Smokes.

== Personal life ==
As of 2021, Smith lives with his wife and two daughters in Oxford, Mississippi.

In June 2020, Smith wrote an op-ed in the Jackson Free Press advocating for the removal of the Confederate battle flag from the Flag of Mississippi.

== Bibliography ==
=== Novels ===
- — (2011). The Hands of Strangers. Mint Hill Books / Main Street Rag Publishing Company. ISBN 978-1-59948-287-3. OCLC 732952726.
- — (2013). Rivers. New York: Simon & Schuster. ISBN 978-1-4516-9942-5. OCLC 817579067.
- — (2017). Desperation Road. New York: Lee Boudreaux Books / Little, Brown and Company. ISBN 978-0-316-35303-8. OCLC 951762587.
- — (2018). The Fighter. New York: Little, Brown and Company. ISBN 978-0-316-43234-4. OCLC 1027480940.
- — (2020). Blackwood. New York: Little, Brown and Company. ISBN 978-0-316-52981-5. OCLC 1108517323.
- — (2021). Nick. New York: Little, Brown and Company. ISBN 978-0-316-52976-1. OCLC 1228119058.
- — (2023). Salvage This World. New York: Little, Brown and Company. ISBN 978-0-316-41363-3.

=== Short fiction ===
- — (2014). In the Beginning: A short story prequel to the novel Rivers. Simon451 / Simon & Schuster.

=== Essays ===
- — (August 10, 2013). "What if Novelists Took Steroids?". The New York Times.
- — (March 29, 2016). "Divide: Whose Side Are You On?". Writer's Bone.
- — (September 22, 2017). "The United States of Mississippi". The Bitter Southerner.
- — (June 3, 2020). "OPINION: Enough. Remove Symbol of Confederacy from the Mississippi Flag Now". Jackson Free Press.

== Filmography ==
Year	Title	Notes
2023	Desperation Road	Writer, Producer
2023	Rumble Through the Dark	Writer, Executive Producer
