= Impossible Vacation =

1992 book

- Author: Spalding Gray
- Language: English
- Genre: Fiction
- Publisher: Alfred A. Knopf
- Publication date: 1992
- Publication place: United States
- Media type: Print
- Pages: 228 pages

Impossible Vacation is a 1992 debut novel written by Spalding Gray.

The novel is based on Gray's monologue that he performed in the film Monster in a Box.

== Overview ==
Following his mother's suicide, a man named Brewster North travels the world in search for peace of mind.

== Critical reception ==
The New York Times said in its review, "One finishes the book impressed by how readily Mr. Gray's narrative voice transfers to the page; how easily he's been able to translate a performance from the stage to the medium of print."
