= Tell Me You Love Me (TV series) =

American drama television series

- Promotional poster
- Created by: Cynthia Mort
- Starring: Jane Alexander; Michelle Borth; Tim DeKay; Luke Kirby; Adam Scott; David Selby; Katharine Towne; Sonya Walger; Ally Walker
- Country of origin: United States
- No. of seasons: 1
- No. of episodes: 10

Production
- Executive producers: Cynthia Mort; Gavin Polone; Vivian Cannon; Patricia Rozema
- Cinematography: Alan Caso; Steve Cosens
- Running time: 47–55 minutes
- Production companies: HBO Entertainment; Pariah

Original release
- Network: HBO
- Release: September 9 – November 11, 2007

Tell Me You Love Me is an American drama television series that premiered on HBO on September 9, 2007.

The series was created by Cynthia Mort and originally conceived as Sexlife. The pilot episode was produced and directed by Patricia Rozema and shot in Winnipeg, Manitoba, while the remainder of the episodes were shot in Los Angeles. The series was picked up by HBO for a second season in October 2007, but was ultimately canceled in July 2008 when Mort said she and the network "were unable to find the direction of the show for the second season".

== Premise ==
Tell Me You Love Me revolves around three couples, all of whom seek the help of therapist Dr. May Foster. Katie and Dave are an outwardly happy couple in their forties with two young kids, but the intimacy in their marriage has faded. Carolyn and Palek are thirtysomething professionals who are trying for a baby, but the pressure to get pregnant is taking a toll on them. Jamie and Hugo are in their twenties and are engaged to be married, but have hesitations about trust and fidelity. May herself has relationship problems with her husband Arthur.

== Cast ==
=== Main ===
- Jane Alexander as Dr. May Foster
- Ally Walker as Katie
- Tim DeKay as Dave
- Michelle Borth as Jamie
- Luke Kirby as Hugo
- Sonya Walger as Carolyn
- Adam Scott as Palek
- David Selby as Arthur Foster
- Aislinn Paul as Isabella, daughter of Katie and Dave
- Ryan Wynott as Joshua, son of Katie and Dave
- Katharine Towne as Mason, Carolyn's sister
- Julie Mond as Nicole

=== Recurring ===
- Jeremy London as Nate
- Ian Somerhalder as Nick
- Sherry Stringfield as Rita, mother of Palek
- Ronny Cox as John
- Whitney Cummings as Louise

== Structure ==
The series was filmed in a cinéma vérité style with mostly handheld cameras, giving it a documentary-like feel. Each episode screens without opening credits. The title card for the show is shown before the closing credits. Except for the end of each episode, there is no non-diegetic music.

== Depiction of sex ==
The series gained early publicity because of its realistic depictions of sexual intercourse, oral sex and masturbation. Director Patricia Rozema and actress Jane Alexander stated the sex performances were simulated.

== Episodes ==
No.	Title	Directed by	Written by	Original release date	Prod. code
1	"Pilot"	Patricia Rozema	Cynthia Mort	September 7, 2007	101
Katie, a forty-something housewife, decides to start seeing Dr. May Foster about the intimacy problems in her marriage to Dave. Palek and Carolyn and thirty-something professionals who are having difficulties trying to conceive. Jamie are Hugo are an engaged couple in their twenties, but Jamie has doubts about whether Hugo can be faithful.
2	"Episode 2"	Patricia Rozema	Cynthia Mort	September 16, 2007	102
Jamie and Hugo's relationship comes to a head over their trust issues. Katie and Dave argue over the value of her therapy sessions with Dr. May. Carolyn is experiencing a surge in her fertility, but Palek seems to be losing interest in their quest to get pregnant.
3	"Episode 3"	Patricia Rozema	Cynthia Mort	September 23, 2007	103
Jamie attempts to move on from Hugo. A night with friends brings up new issues for Carolyn and Palek. May reaches out to an old acquaintance.
4	"Episode 4"	Rodrigo García	Anya Epstein, Cynthia Mort	September 30, 2007	104
Dave decides to join Katie in therapy and surprises her when he has something to admit during their session. Carolyn confides to Palek that she had an abortion during college and wonders if that has affected her fertility, which stokes Palek's insecurity. Jamie attempts to reunite with Hugo but is rebuffed, leading her to seek guidance from May.
5	"Episode 5"	Anthony Hemingway	Vanessa Taylor, Cynthia Mort	October 7, 2007	105
Carolyn and Palek try a more aggressive approach in their efforts to get pregnant. May suggests a first step to solve Dave and Katie's intimacy problems. Jamie resolves to try celibacy, but meets Nick, whose own relationship is on the rocks.
6	"Episode 6"	Ernest R. Dickerson	David Schulner, Cynthia Mort	October 14, 2007	106
May offers up a novel idea for Dave and Katie to save their marriage. Carolyn and Palek come to terms with their infertility, prompting Palek to admit he feels relief at not having to be a parent. They also put their home on the market when Palek expresses his wish to move. At work, Carolyn steps up her effort to be made partner at her law firm. After an awkward visit with Nick's family, Jamie and Nick assess their relationship. At her husband Arthur's insistence, May meets up with an old flame named John.
7	"Episode 7"	Melanie Mayron	David Gould, Dylan Gary, Cynthia Mort	October 21, 2007	107
Katie and Dave get a rare night without their kids and make small steps towards rekindling their intimacy. Jamie's relationship with Nick is jeopardized by the reappearance of Hugo. Though they have moved to a new home, Palek and Carolyn's problems continue.
8	"Episode 8"	Alex Zakrzewski	Anya Epstein, Cynthia Mort	October 28, 2007	108
Carolyn happily discovers to her surprise that she is pregnant, but Palek worries about losing his identity. Dave and Katie debate the value of continued therapy. Nick is spending more with Jamie, but she can't tell him what he wants to hear.
9	"Episode 9"	Melanie Mayron	David Schulner, Vanessa Taylor, Cynthia Mort	November 4, 2007	109
Unsettling news from her friend Rita sends Katie into an identity crisis, leaving Dave to handle the household and therapy alone. Meanwhile, Palek finds it difficult to cope with his mounting anxiety of impending parenthood, to Carolyn's bewilderment. Jamie decides to be honest about her feelings to Nick, with unanticipated results.
10	"Episode 10"	Melanie Mayron	Cynthia Mort	November 11, 2007	110
Katie and Dave have a tense confrontation that leads to a breakthrough. Hugo and Jamie reconcile and make an impulsive decision. May is distressed when she hears upsetting news about John. Palek moves out of his home with Carolyn, but reconsiders his situation when Carolyn suffers a loss.

== Reception ==
On review aggregator Rotten Tomatoes, Tell Me You Love Me has an approval score of 62% based on 26 reviews, with an average rating of 6.4/10.

The Washington Post's Tom Shales called the series "not only more provocative than any of the broadcast networks' new fall shows, but also more sophisticated -- even than those shows that aspire to be 'adult.'" Robert Abele of LA Weekly wrote, "It’s a welcome change of pace from the usually sleek, shimmering, big-budget look of HBO's dramas, and recalls the way Ingmar Bergman adapted his cinematic soul-searching to the small screen to achieve an unfussy, probing and still visually striking richness for his you-are-there portrait of a crumbling union in Scenes From a Marriage."

Maureen Ryan of the Chicago Tribune said, "'Tell Me' does something that we rely on TV at its best — and HBO at its best — to do: Explore something interesting about the human condition, through stories and characters that are specific and memorable." Frazier Moore of the Associated Press said: "'Tell Me' is nothing if not finely wrought and nuanced, shifting between its parallel narratives (each couple seeing Dr. Foster has minimal contact or awareness of the others in this Southern California community) as the universal issues at the series' heart unfold at their natural pace." Time's James Poniewozik named it one of the Top 10 New TV Series of 2007, ranking it at No. 3.

Writing for The New Yorker, Nancy Franklin said "Tell Me has its flaws, but it's very watchable (and not merely because it’s arousing); its aim is to show you what committed relationships feel like, and how they work, and how strange and fragile and complicated they are." Alessandra Stanley of The New York Times said "the series is bold in its candor and unhurried attention to detail, but not quite brave enough to lay bare the bleakest, pettiest injuries that can scar a marriage."

Critics praised the series' realistic and honest depiction of sex, with Abele saying "these scenes practically force us to realize how often sexuality in movies and television acts as a titillating diversion devoid of its own character-enriching qualities." Others pointed out how the series' portrayal of the sex lives of a sexagenarian couple is "a rarity, and a commendable one, for a medium so obsessed with youth".

Multiple reviews praised the acting. Of DeKay and Walker, Poniewozik wrote they "are especially astonishing as a couple who are repressed, overcommitted and yet genuinely in love. Their home life is all friendly small talk, but when they get into therapy, they explode". Karen Valby of Entertainment Weekly said "Walger's Carolyn is fascinatingly mean and guarded and riveting", and Abele wrote "Scott's Palek, in particular, is a quiet marvel of suppressed selfishness".

Others critiqued the show's pacing and commented on how the characters are unlikable. Mary McNamara of the Los Angeles Times said the show lacks "a sense of humor and a certain level of humility." Writing for Entertainment Weekly, Gillian Flynn said, "Tell Me is an incisive drama, but it's not an easy commitment." David Bianculli of the NY Daily News said, "Whether you wish to commit to 'Tell Me' on a weekly basis may depend upon your tolerance for, or personal experience with, infidelity, infertility and incompatibility. These couples' stories, though, are told very well. Come for the sex, if you must, but stay for the honesty."

The series was named one of AFI's Television Programs of the Year.

Vulture ranked Tell Me You Love Me at No. 35 in its list "Every HBO Show, Ranked", commenting, "The show now seems like a precursor to In Treatment and Togetherness, and perhaps better than both in its frankness."

=== Ratings ===
The first episode of the show only attracted a total of about 910,000 viewers—far fewer than what the network had been pulling in for previous series such as Rome, Deadwood, and even the ill-fated John from Cincinnati. A month after its debut, HBO claimed the show had drawn a total of 3.1 million viewers across seven broadcasts.

== Home media ==
Tell Me You Love Me was released on DVD on February 11, 2008. The release includes four audio commentaries. It received a DVD release in Australia on April 29, 2009. It was released in Israel in 2008.
