= Rumble Through the Dark =

2023 film by Graham and Parker Phillips

- Theatrical release poster
- Directed by: Graham Phillips; Parker Phillips
- Written by: Michael Farris Smith
- Based on: The Fighter by Michael Farris Smith
- Produced by: Cassian Elwes; Cleta Ellington; Graham Phillips; Parker Phillips
- Starring: Aaron Eckhart; Bella Thorne; Ritchie Coster; Amanda Saunders; Joe Hursley; Mike McColl; Derek Russo; Christopher Winchester; Marianne Jean-Baptiste
- Cinematography: David J. Myrick
- Edited by: Ned Thorne
- Music by: Brad Smith
- Production companies: Grindstone Entertainment; Phillips Pictures; 120dB Films
- Distributed by: Lionsgate
- Release date: November 3, 2023
- Running time: 116 minutes
- Country: United States
- Language: English

Rumble Through the Dark is a 2023 American action thriller film directed by Graham Phillips and Parker Phillips, and written by Michael Farris Smith, based on his novel The Fighter. It stars Aaron Eckhart and Bella Thorne. It was released by Lionsgate on digital formats and in limited theaters on November 3, 2023

== Plot ==
Jack Boucher is an orphan and the happily adopted son of Mary Anne. Boucher borrows money from criminal Big Momma Sweet for Mary Anne's medical expenses. He becomes a successful underground pit fighter, known as "the Butcher", to repay the loan. The income is insufficient, and instead Boucher raises the money through gambling. The threat of foreclosure on Mary Anne's house forces Boucher to choose to repay the bank instead of Big Momma; he kills Big Momma's debt collector. Boucher fights a man from Big Momma on the way home. Boucher crashes his car in a corn field, then makes his way to a nearby bar and passes out. Annette, who works at a carnival, passes through the corn field and retrieves the money. With the money missing, Big Momma grants a desperate Boucher an extension on repayment on the condition that - should he fail - he becomes her pit fighter again.

Boucher rescues Annette at a gas station and provides her with transportation. They stop at Mary Anne's house where Boucher apologizes for being unable to prevent the foreclosure. Annette reads Boucher's diary and deduces that he is her lost father; they reconcile.

Boucher takes the money to Big Momma. She challenges Boucher to one last fight for enough money to save the house; he accepts and wins against a physically larger opponent. With all of his debts cleared, Boucher returns to live happily with Annette and Mary Anne.

== Cast ==
- Aaron Eckhart as Jack Boucher
- Bella Thorne as Annette
- Ritchie Coster as Baron
- Amanda Saunders as Young Maryann
- Joe Hursley as Skelly
- Mike McColl as Ricky Joe
- Derek Russo as Ax
- Christopher Winchester as Ern
- Marianne Jean-Baptiste as Big Momma Sweet
- Liz Fenning as Curvy Luck
- Ritchie Montgomery as Rhett

== Production ==
Aaron Eckhart signed on in June 2021 to star in the film. Principal photography took place from late July to September 2021 in Natchez, Mississippi and the surrounding delta region. Production was shut down for two days due to Hurricane Ida's rainfall.

== Release ==
Rumble Through the Dark was released by Lionsgate on digital formats and in limited theaters on November 3, 2023.

== Reception ==
On the review aggregator website Rotten Tomatoes, 70% of 10 critics' reviews are positive, with an average rating of 5.3/10.
