= Cynthia Mort =

American screenwriter and director

- Occupations: Screenwriter; Television producer; Television creator; Film director; Film producer
- Notable work: The Brave One; Nina
- Television: Roseanne; Will & Grace; Tell Me You Love Me

Cynthia Mort is an American screenwriter, television producer, television creator, film director, and film producer. She worked as a writer and producer on Roseanne and as a writer and consulting producer on Will & Grace. She created and executive produced the HBO drama series Tell Me You Love Me (2007). Her film work includes co-writing The Brave One (2007) and writing and directing the Nina Simone biographical film Nina (2016).

== Early life ==
Mort grew up in Detroit, Michigan.

== Career ==
=== Television ===
Her writing credits on Roseanne include the 1994 episode "Maybe Baby". She also co-wrote "Mothers and Other Strangers" (1996) with Roseanne Barr. She was a producer and co-writer, with Nancy Steen, of "Millions from Heaven" (1996). By December 1996, she was a supervising producer, a role she also held on the 1997 series finale, "Into That Good Night".

She later worked as a consulting producer on Will & Grace and wrote "Star-Spangled Banter", which aired on November 15, 2001.

==== Tell Me You Love Me ====
Mort created Tell Me You Love Me and served as an executive producer alongside Gavin Polone. The ten-episode drama premiered on HBO on September 9, 2007. It follows three couples at different stages of their relationships and the therapist they consult, played by Jane Alexander. Mort developed the idea after observing friends who wanted to remain married but were unhappy in their relationships. In pitching the series to HBO, she proposed depicting intimacy without cutting away from sexual encounters. HBO entertainment president Carolyn Strauss supported the approach.

The production used handheld cameras and little incidental music. Its explicit, simulated sex scenes attracted press attention before the premiere. Mort said that their purpose was to convey the characters' emotions and intimacy rather than to reproduce sexual activity for its own sake.

San Francisco Chronicle critic Tim Goodman praised Mort's attention to small exchanges between couples, while finding the show's emotional realism difficult to watch. Brian Lowry of Variety praised its candor but criticized its lack of humor and the characterization of the men. The American Film Institute selected it as one of its television programs of the year for 2007.

The premiere drew about 910,000 viewers, although Variety noted that HBO had made the episode available on demand before its broadcast. HBO renewed the series in October 2007, then abandoned the second season in July 2008. Mort said the creative team had been unable to establish a direction for the season; HBO programming president Michael Lombardo said the network intended to continue working with her.

==== Tilda ====
With Bill Condon, Mort co-wrote the HBO comedy pilot Tilda, starring Diane Keaton as a Hollywood blogger. Condon directed the pilot. In August 2010, TheWrap reported that Mort had been removed as showrunner following disagreements during production; HBO declined to comment on that report. HBO subsequently commissioned additional scripts and brought in other executive producers. In February 2011, it declined to proceed with the series, ahead of the expiry of the cast's options.

=== Film screenwriting ===
Mort shared the screenplay credit for The Brave One (2007) with Roderick Taylor and Bruce A. Taylor; the Taylors received the story credit. Directed by Neil Jordan, the film stars Jodie Foster and Terrence Howard. Foster said that she spent six to eight months working on revisions with Mort before Jordan joined the project. Warner Bros. released the film in September 2007.

=== Nina ===
Nina was Mort's feature directorial debut. She wrote the screenplay and was credited as a producer. The film stars Zoe Saldaña as Nina Simone and David Oyelowo as her assistant and manager, Clifton Henderson, focusing on Simone's later life in France. According to the account of the project's development in Mort's subsequent lawsuit, she worked with Paramount Pictures from 2005 to 2012 before assigning the rights to Ealing and Nina Productions. Mary J. Blige was initially attached to play Simone, but withdrew because of scheduling conflicts.

Saldaña's casting and the use of makeup to darken her skin prompted criticism. Film scholar David Sterritt interpreted the darkened complexion as an evocation of blackface, connecting it to the history of racial representation in American entertainment. Simone's daughter, Lisa Simone Kelly, objected to the film's depiction of her mother's relationship with Henderson and said the family had not been consulted. Distributor RLJ Entertainment defended Saldaña's performance and said casting should not be judged by skin color or ethnicity. In 2020, Saldaña apologized for accepting the role.

In May 2014, Mort's loan-out company sued Ealing Studios Enterprises Limited in Los Angeles Superior Court, alleging breaches of her director's agreement. The complaint alleged that the producers had taken control of editing in June 2013, abandoned her cuts, and failed to consult her about creative and financial decisions. It sought damages and a declaration requiring the defendants to obtain her approval and consultation. The suit had been dismissed by the time The New Yorker reported on the film in August 2014. Producer Barnaby Thompson attributed the editing dispute to budget and time constraints. Mort praised Saldaña's performance but expressed reservations about the finished film.

After several postponements, including an announced December 2015 opening, RLJ Entertainment scheduled the film for a simultaneous theatrical, digital, and video-on-demand release on April 22, 2016. It opened on that date. In his review for TheWrap, Dan Callahan criticized its screenplay, performances, and treatment of Simone's career.

=== Later work ===
In October 2016, Screen International reported that Mort was attached to write and direct the thriller Jane Millen, with Olga Kurylenko in the lead role and financing from 13 Films. In 2017, Hulu began developing Unspeakable, an adaptation of Meghan Daum's essay collection The Unspeakable: And Other Subjects of Discussion. Mort was announced as its writer and showrunner, with Mary McCormack attached to star and Chelsea Handler as an executive producer.

Mort wrote, directed, and produced the musical drama When We Kill the Creators, starring Shelby Lynne as a singer confronting the costs of a career in music. It premiered at Cinema on the Bayou in Lafayette, Louisiana, on January 22, 2020. The film was subsequently offered for digital rental and purchase. Mort wrote lyrics for songs on Lynne's self-titled album (2020), which included music from the film.

== Personal life ==
Mort had a relationship with actress and director Melanie Mayron.

== Selected filmography ==
=== Film ===
Year	Title	Roles	Notes
2007	The Brave One	Co-screenwriter	Story credited to Roderick Taylor and Bruce A. Taylor
2016	Nina	Director, screenwriter, producer	Feature film
2020	When We Kill the Creators	Director, screenwriter, producer	Festival premiere in 2020; digital distribution

=== Television ===
Year	Title	Roles	Notes
1994–1997	Roseanne	Writer, producer, supervising producer	Writing credit in 1994; producer in 1996; supervising producer by December 1996
2001	Will & Grace	Writer	"Star-Spangled Banter"; also worked on the series as a consulting producer
2007	Tell Me You Love Me	Creator, writer, executive producer	Drama series
2010	Tilda	Co-writer, showrunner	Pilot; HBO declined to commission a series in 2011
