= Nina (2016 film) =

- Theatrical release poster
- Directed by: Cynthia Mort
- Written by: Cynthia Mort
- Produced by: Ben Latham-Jones; Stuart Parr; Barnaby Thompson; David Oyelowo
- Starring: Zoe Saldaña; David Oyelowo; Ella Thomas; Mike Epps
- Cinematography: Mihai Mălaimare Jr.
- Edited by: Mark Helfrich; Susan Wittenberg; Josh Rifkin
- Music by: Ruy Folguera
- Production companies: Ealing Studios; Londinium Films
- Distributed by: RLJ Entertainment
- Release date: April 22, 2016 (United States)
- Running time: 90 minutes
- Country: United States
- Language: English
- Box office: $22,584

Nina is a 2016 American biographical film written and directed by Cynthia Mort. The film focuses on American musician and civil rights activist Nina Simone, portrayed by Zoe Saldaña. The film also stars David Oyelowo, Ella Thomas, and Mike Epps. It had a limited release beginning April 22, 2016, and through video on demand by RLJ Entertainment.

The film received strong criticism, including the casting of Saldaña in the lead, and Simone's family refused to endorse it. Saldaña later said she regretted accepting the lead role.

== Plot ==
In 1988, Nina Simone is financially unsound, mentally unstable, and an alcoholic. Her 1960s heyday is far behind her. After threatening a lawyer with a gun, she is forcibly committed to a Los Angeles psychiatric hospital for twenty-four hours. While in the hospital, Nina hires orderly Clifton Henderson (David Oyelowo) as an assistant. He accompanies her to her home in Bouc-Bel-Air, France.

Nina drinks heavily and refuses to take needed medication. She proves to be difficult and confrontational. She verbally abuses Clifton, assaults a patron at a nightclub performance and makes Clifton get her random men with whom she has one-night stands. Her behavior drives Clifton back home to America.

Nina is told by her doctor that the results of a biopsy are serious, and she needs treatment for cancer.

Nina arrives unannounced at Clifton's family home in Chicago, much to the amusement of his family and his embarrassment. She tells Clifton that she wants him to be her manager. He is hesitant but agrees to work for her again.

Clifton attempts to book shows in France, but few people want to deal with Nina's difficult behavior. His efforts eventually pay off and she performs marvelously at a gig. He gets a studio, and she begins recording new music. It is implied that they begin a sexual relationship. Worried about her health, he convinces her to undergo recommended surgery for her cancer.

Once recovered, Nina returns to the United States for a live performance in New York's Central Park. A crowd flocks to see her and she opens her concert with the song "Feeling Good."

== Cast ==
- Zoe Saldaña as Nina Simone
- David Oyelowo as Clifton Henderson
- Kevin Mambo as Gilles
- Ronald Guttman as Henri Edwards
- Chuma Gault as Nina's Husband
- Mike Epps as Richard Pryor
- Keith David as Clifton's Dad
- Ella Joyce as Clifton's Mom
- Ella Thomas as Lorraine Hansberry
- Marianne Muellerleile as Nurse Mary
- Yasmine Golchan as Doctor Cousier
- Siena Goines as Heather
- Bonnie Bartlett as Recital Stage Woman
- Camille Natta as Michelle Laroche
- Michael Vartan as Radio Interviewer

== Production ==
=== Development ===
In May 2010, it was announced Mary J. Blige and David Oyelowo had been cast in the film as Nina Simone, and Clifton Henderson respectively, with Cynthia Mort directing the film from a screenplay she had written, and production planned for September of that year. In August 2012, it was announced that Zoe Saldaña, who is Afro-Latina, had been cast in the film, replacing Blige as Simone, Blige having exited due to financial issues with the project. The casting of Saldaña caused controversy, with Simone Kelly, Simone's daughter, saying, "My mother was raised at a time when she was told her nose was too wide, her skin was too dark. Appearance-wise this is not the best choice."

In 2014, Mort had begun taking legal action after being cut out of the decision-making process, making her unhappy with the project she spent several years developing.

=== Filming ===
Production was originally scheduled to begin in September 2010 in France. Principal photography began on October 16, 2012, in Los Angeles, California. To more accurately portray Simone's likeness, light-skinned Afro-Latina Saldaña used dark makeup, nasal and dental prosthetics, and wigs when playing to role of Simone for the film. These adjustments to Saldaña's natural appearance continued to raise controversy with Nina Simone fans, viewers and racial justice advocates like Ta-Nehisi Coates.

== Release ==
In September 2015, RLJ Entertainment acquired American distribution rights to the film with a planned December 2015 release. The film was released on April 22, 2016, in a limited release and through video on demand. After the film's trailer had been released, Simone's estate's Twitter account tweeted at Saldaña, writing, "Please take Nina's name out of your mouth. For the rest of your life. Hopefully people begin to understand this is painful. Gut-wrenching, heartbreaking, nauseating, soul-crushing. It shall pass, but for now." Robert L. Johnson, the chairman and founder of RLJ, issued a statement, saying, "Zoe Saldaña delivers an exceptional and mesmerizing tribute to Nina Simone. She gave her heart and soul to the role and displayed her extraordinary talent. The most important thing is that creativity or quality of performance should never be judged on the basis of color, or ethnicity, or physical likeness. Quality entertainment should be measured by the sheer force of creativity and the commitment that an actor or actress brings to the performance."

== Reception ==
On Rotten Tomatoes, the film has an approval rating of 2% based on 41 reviews, with an average rating of 3.40/10. The website's critics consensus reads, "A wholly misguided tribute to its subject's searing talent and enduring impact, Nina is the cinematic equivalent of a covers project featuring all the wrong artists." On Metacritic, the film has a weighted average score of 27 out of 100, based on 19 critics, indicating "generally unfavorable reviews".

In August 2020, in the wake of the murder of George Floyd and the height of the Black Lives Matter movement, Saldaña said she regretted taking on the role. Having previously defended the role, Saldaña, who identifies as Afro-Latina, said, "I should have never played Nina. I should have done everything in my power, with the leverage that I had 10 years ago--a different leverage but it was leverage nonetheless. I should have tried everything in my power to cast a Black woman to play an exceptionally perfect Black woman."
