= Monster in a Box =

1992 monologue film by Nick Broomfield

- Directed by: Nick Broomfield
- Written by: Spalding Gray
- Produced by: Jon Blair; Norman I. Cohen; Renée Shafransky
- Starring: Spalding Gray
- Cinematography: Michael Coulter
- Music by: Laurie Anderson
- Release date: 1992
- Running time: 87 min
- Country: United States
- Language: English
- Box office: $311,245

Monster in a Box is a monologue originally performed live on stage by the writer Spalding Gray then subsequently made into a 1992 film starring Gray and directed by Nick Broomfield.

A follow-up to Gray's earlier work, Swimming to Cambodia, the work consists of a long-form monologue by Gray detailing the trials and tribulations he encountered while writing his first novel, Impossible Vacation.

The soundtrack for the film was composed by Laurie Anderson.

A book version of the monologue was published in 1992.

== Reception ==
New York magazine praised the film saying, "Monster in a Box is subtly and intricately woven and often very funny."

The New York Times wrote, "Like "Swimming to Cambodia," the new film is sly and funny and dead-on serious, full of the kind of particular details that separate the poet from the journalist, all of which are delivered with what might be called committed skepticism."
