= Mariann Mayberry =

American actress (1965–2017)

- Born: May 25, 1965; Springfield, Missouri, U.S.
- Died: August 1, 2017 (aged 52); Simsbury, Connecticut, U.S.
- Education: Illinois Wesleyan University
- Occupation: Actress
- Spouse: Scott Jaeck (m. 2006)

Mariann Mayberry (May 25, 1965 – August 1, 2017) was an American television and stage actress.

== Biography ==
In 1993, Mayberry became an ensemble member of the Steppenwolf Theatre Company in Chicago, Illinois. While at Steppenwolf, she was nominated for a Joseph Jefferson Award for Actress in a Supporting Role in a Play for Time of My Life, and again for Actress in a Principal Role in a Play for Hysteria, directed by John Malkovich.

In 2006, Mayberry married fellow actor Scott Jaeck, with whom she shared the stage in the Broadway run of Tracy Letts' Tony Award- and Pulitzer Prize-winning play August: Osage County.

== Later years and death ==
In early 2013, Mayberry was diagnosed with ovarian cancer.

In August 2015, after a run of Grand Concourse, Mayberry retired from the stage. On August 1, 2017, aged 52, Mayberry died of ovarian cancer at her sister (Melissa Hollander)'s home in Simsbury, Connecticut. At the time, Mayberry lived in New York with her husband of 11 years, actor Scott Jaeck.

The Steppenwolf Theatre cancelled that night's show as a gesture of respect.

== Filmography ==
- Under the Influence (1994)
- Tangled (1997) as JC
- Since You've Been Gone (1998) (TV) as Chelsea Trotman
- Law & Order: Special Victims Unit as Candy Forrester (1 episode, 2002)
- The Pennsylvania Miners' Story (2002) (TV) as Cathy Hileman
- The Company (2003) as stepmother
- Life Sentence (2004) as Maddie
- War of the Worlds (2005) as mother
- Kubuku Rides (This Is It) (2006) as bar maid
- Law & Order: Criminal Intent (2006) as Monica Corbett
- Delocated as therapist (1 episode, 2009)
- Handsome Harry (2009) as Judy Rheems
- Dogman (2012) as wife
- Dogman 2 (2013) as wife
- Blue Bloods (2015) in the episode 'Sins of the Father' (Season 5 - Episode 10) as Janice Phillips, the mother

== Theatre ==
=== Steppenwolf Theatre Company ===
- The Geography of Luck (1989)
- Wrong Turn at Lungfish (1990)
- Ghost in the Machine (1993)
- Time of My Life (1995)
- As I Lay Dying (1995)
- Slavs! (1995)
- Everyman (A Moral Play) (1995)
- The Libertine (1996)
- Time to Burn (1997)
- Space (1997)
- A Fair Country (1998)
- The Berlin Circle (1998)
- Hysteria (1999)
- One Flew Over the Cuckoo's Nest (2000)
- Cross-Town Traffic (2000)
- David Copperfield (2001)
- Wendall Greene (2002)
- The Pain and the Itch (2005)
- Last of the Boys (2005)
- Love Song (2006)
- The Diary of Anne Frank (2007)
- August: Osage County (2007)
- Good People (2012)
- The MArch (2012).... Mattie
- Grand Concourse (2015)

=== Other ===
- The Notebooks of Leonardo Da Vinci, Goodman Theatre
- The Odyssey, Goodman Theatre
- Mirror of the Invisible World, Goodman Theatre
- How I Learned to Drive, Northlight Theater and Alliance Theatre
- Metamorphoses, Lookingglass Theatre
- Argonautika, Lookingglass Theatre
- The Master and Margarita, Lookingglass Theatre
- Proof, Virginia Stage Company
- The Time of Your Life, Seattle and San Francisco Theatres
