= Swimming to Cambodia =

1987 film by Jonathan Demme

- Video cover
- Directed by: Jonathan Demme
- Written by: Spalding Gray
- Produced by: Lewis M. Allen; Renée Shafransky
- Starring: Spalding Gray
- Cinematography: John Bailey
- Edited by: Carol Littleton
- Music by: Laurie Anderson
- Production company: The Swimming Company
- Distributed by: Cinecom Pictures
- Release date: 1987
- Running time: 85 minutes
- Language: English

Swimming to Cambodia, also known as Spalding Gray's Swimming to Cambodia, is a 1987 American performance monologue written by and starring Spalding Gray, and directed by Jonathan Demme. The performance film is of Gray's play and monologue, which centered on such themes as his trip to Southeast Asia to create the role of the U.S. Ambassador's aide in the film The Killing Fields, the Cold War, Cambodia Year Zero, and his search for his "perfect moment." It was nominated for Best Feature at the 1988 Independent Spirit Awards along with Best Director, Best Actor and Best Screenplay.

== Background ==
Over a period of two years, Gray originally developed Swimming to Cambodia as a theatre performance piece. The original running time of the performance was four hours, and it was presented over two nights. Gray received a Special Citation for this work at the 1985 Obie Awards.

In 2001, Gray revived Swimming to Cambodia, performing it on stage in Los Angeles, Chicago, San Francisco, and Albany, New York.

== Content ==
The opening shots of the film show Gray walking toward the Performing Garage in New York City. He enters, and after passing the audience, takes a seat behind a table. On the table are a glass of water, a microphone, and a notebook, the latter brought by Gray. Behind him are two pull-down maps. One is a map of Southeast Asia and the other is a diagram of the bombing of Cambodia, which Gray explains was called Operation Breakfast. There is also a back-lit projection screen showing a photograph of a beach.

Gray's monologue describes his experiences filming a small role in the film The Killing Fields, and the then-recent history of Cambodia up through the rise to power of the Khmer Rouge and the Cambodian genocide. Three scenes from The Killing Fields that feature Gray are shown at various points in the film.

The Killing Fields' second unit cinematographer Ivan Strasburg and Gray's then girlfriend Renée Shafransky are featured characters that Gray discusses throughout the film.

== Production ==
The soundtrack for the film was composed and performed by Laurie Anderson, who would also score Gray's follow-up film, Monster in a Box.

Gray later provided the voice of a TV interviewer for Anderson's 1986 short film, What You Mean We? No soundtrack album was released; Anderson later reused music from the film for a series of "Personal Service Announcements" which she produced in 1989 to promote her album, Strange Angels.

While Sam Waterston and Ira Wheeler are credited as cast in this film, they appear only in clips used from The Killing Fields.

== Critical reception ==
Janet Maslin writing for The New York Times, "Mr. Gray's feature-length monologue brings people, places and things so vibrantly to life that they're very nearly visible on the screen."

Sean Burns writing for WBUR, "Whenever current events get too insane and overwhelming, I take solace in the film and Gray’s quixotic search for beauty and the sublime in a world where unspeakable horrors and atrocities happen every day. As you might imagine, it’s been in pretty heavy rotation lately."

== Home media ==
Shout! Factory announced plans for a DVD release of Swimming to Cambodia on May 28, 2013.

In 2025, Vinegar Syndrome's Cinématographe label released Swimming to Cambodia on Blu-ray.
