= Bette Gordon =

American filmmaker

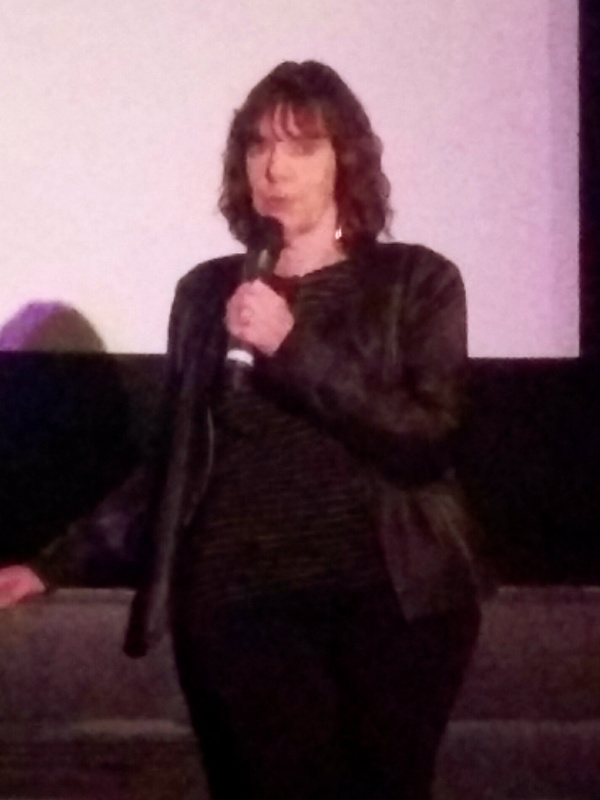
Bette Gordon in 2017

Bette Gordon (born June 22, 1950) is an American filmmaker and professor at Columbia University School of the Arts. She is best known for her films Variety (1983) and Handsome Harry (2009), both of which received critical acclaim in North America and abroad.

== Personal life ==
Gordon began making films in the mid-1970s in the Midwestern United States, including in Chicago, Illinois and Madison, Wisconsin. These short films were experimental, dealing with movement through place, sexuality, culture, and structure. She cites French New Wave filmmaker Jean-Luc Godard as a major inspiration to her as an artist and a filmmaker saying, "Having grown up through the '70s, I could not have found a more appropriate mentor. His radical approach to the use of sound and image helped shape me as much as the questions he asked the viewer to consider, most importantly, the relationship between truth and fiction." She also lists Wong Kar Wai's In the Mood for Love, R.W. Fassbinder, John Cassavetes and films like The Last Picture Show and Midnight Cowboy as inspirational for their portrayal of relationships and love. She considers the time she spent in New York in the early 1980s instrumental to her career because she was able to collaborate with new artists for the sake of creating art rather than making money. At that period, she also shifted to making more feature-length films. She is a friend of actor Steve Buscemi and cast him in her film Handsome Harry because she felt as though it was a role unlike any he had ever played before. Gordon married Australian filmmaker Tim Burns and they have one daughter, Lili Burns.

In December 2023, alongside 50 other filmmakers, Gordon signed an open letter published in Libération demanding a ceasefire and an end to the killing of civilians amid the 2023 Israeli invasion of the Gaza Strip, and for a humanitarian corridor into Gaza to be established for humanitarian aid, and the release of hostages.

== Career ==
Gordon is said to be "known for her bold explorations of themes related to sexuality, violence and power." Her film Variety explores the relationship between women, pornography and voyeurism. The title character of the film "turns the tables on men" by renegotiating the historically exploitative relationship between men and women with respect to pornographic films. She says, "My films have always focused on the visual aspects of storytelling. I've been drawn to stories in which color, texture and mood are as central to the narrative as character and plot." Though much of her work is focused on women and the female experience, some of her recent work - most notably Handsome Harry - examines the social constraints placed on men and tensions between hetero-normative masculinity and homosexuality. In the film, described as "relentless" by a review in The New York Times, the main character is struggling to confront the emotional and physical trauma he and his friends inflicted on a homosexual friend while in the Navy many years prior.

== Academia ==
Gordon holds a BA, MA, and MFA from The University of Wisconsin–Madison and is now a part of the film department of Columbia University School of the Arts. Some of her films are now a part of permanent collections in several different museums including the Museum of Modern Art and the Whitney Museum of American Art.

== Selected filmography ==
- 1974: Michigan Avenue (short)
- 1974: I-94 (short)
- 1975: United States of America (short; co-directed with James Benning)
- 1976: An Algorithm (short)
- 1978: Exchanges (short)
- 1980: Empty Suitcases (short)
- 1981: Anybody's Woman
- 1983: Variety
- 1986: Greed - Pay to Play (short)
- 1998: Luminous Motion
- 2003: Life on the Line (TV Movie)
- 2009: Handsome Harry
- 2016: The Drowning
