= Steven Soderbergh filmography =

The following is a filmography cataloguing the works of American film director, producer, and screenwriter Steven Soderbergh. He has directed 33 feature films and eight television programs. His directorial works have grossed over US$2.2 billion worldwide.

== Feature film ==
Year	Title	Director	Writer	Producer	DoP	Editor	Notes
1985	9012Live	Yes	No	No	No	Yes	Concert film, feature documentary directorial debut
1989	Sex, Lies, and Videotape	Yes	Yes	No	No	Yes	Feature narrative directorial debut
1991	Kafka	Yes	No	No	No	Yes	
1993	King of the Hill	Yes	Yes	No	No	Yes	Based on the novel of the same name by A.E. Hotchner
1995	The Underneath	Yes	Yes	No	No	No	Co-screenwriter (credited as Sam Lowry) with Daniel Fuchs; Based on the novel Criss Cross by Don Tracy
1996	Schizopolis	Yes	Yes	No	Yes	Yes	All credits are uncredited, co-edited with Sarah Flack, also co-composer (with Cliff Martinez) and actor; roles: Fletcher Munson / Dr. Jeffrey Korchek
1996	Gray's Anatomy	Yes	No	No	No	No	
1997	Nightwatch	No	Yes	No	No	No	Co-screenwriter with Ole Bornedal; remake of the film Nattevagten, written by Ole Bornedal
1998	Out of Sight	Yes	No	No	No	No	
1999	The Limey	Yes	No	No	No	No	
2000	Erin Brockovich	Yes	No	No	No	No	
2000	Traffic	Yes	No	No	Yes (Note: Credited as Peter Andrews)	No	
2001	Ocean's Eleven	Yes	No	No	Yes	No	
2002	Full Frontal	Yes	No	No	Yes	No	
2002	Solaris	Yes	Yes	No	Yes	Yes (Note: Credited as Mary Ann Bernard)	Based on the novel of the same name by Stanisław Lem
2004	Eros	Yes	Yes	No	Yes	Yes	Segment: "Equilibrium"
2004	Criminal	No	Yes	Yes	No	No	Co-screenwriter (with Gregory Jacobs) (credited as Sam Lowry); Based on the film Nueve reinas, written by Fabián Bielinsky
2004	Ocean's Twelve	Yes	No	No	Yes	No	
2005	Bubble	Yes	No	No	Yes	Yes	
2006	The Good German	Yes	No	No	Yes	Yes	
2007	Ocean's Thirteen	Yes	No	No	Yes	No	
2008	Che	Yes	No	No	Yes	No	2-part film
2009	The Girlfriend Experience	Yes	No	No	Yes	Yes	
2009	The Informant!	Yes	No	No	Yes	No	
2010	And Everything Is Going Fine	Yes	No	No	No	No	Documentary
2011	Contagion	Yes	No	No	Yes	No	
2011	Haywire	Yes	No	No	Yes	Yes	
2012	Magic Mike	Yes	No	No	Yes	Yes	
2013	Side Effects	Yes	No	No	Yes	Yes	
2015	Magic Mike XXL	No	No	Executive	Yes	Yes	Also camera operator
2017	Logan Lucky	Yes	No	No	Yes	Yes	
2018	Unsane	Yes	No	No	Yes	Yes	
2019	High Flying Bird	Yes	No	No	Yes	Yes	
2019	The Laundromat	Yes	No	No	Yes	Yes	
2020	Let Them All Talk	Yes	No	No	Yes	Yes	
2021	No Sudden Move	Yes	No	No	Yes	Yes	
2022	Kimi	Yes	No	No	Yes	Yes	
2023	Magic Mike's Last Dance	Yes	No	No	Yes	Yes	
2024	Presence	Yes	No	No	Yes	Yes	Also camera operator
2025	Black Bag	Yes	No	No	Yes	Yes	
2025	The Christophers	Yes	No	No	Yes	Yes	
2026	John Lennon: The Last Interview	Yes	No	Executive	Yes	No	Documentary
TBA	The Return of Stanley Atwell	No	Original story	Executive	No	No	Post-production

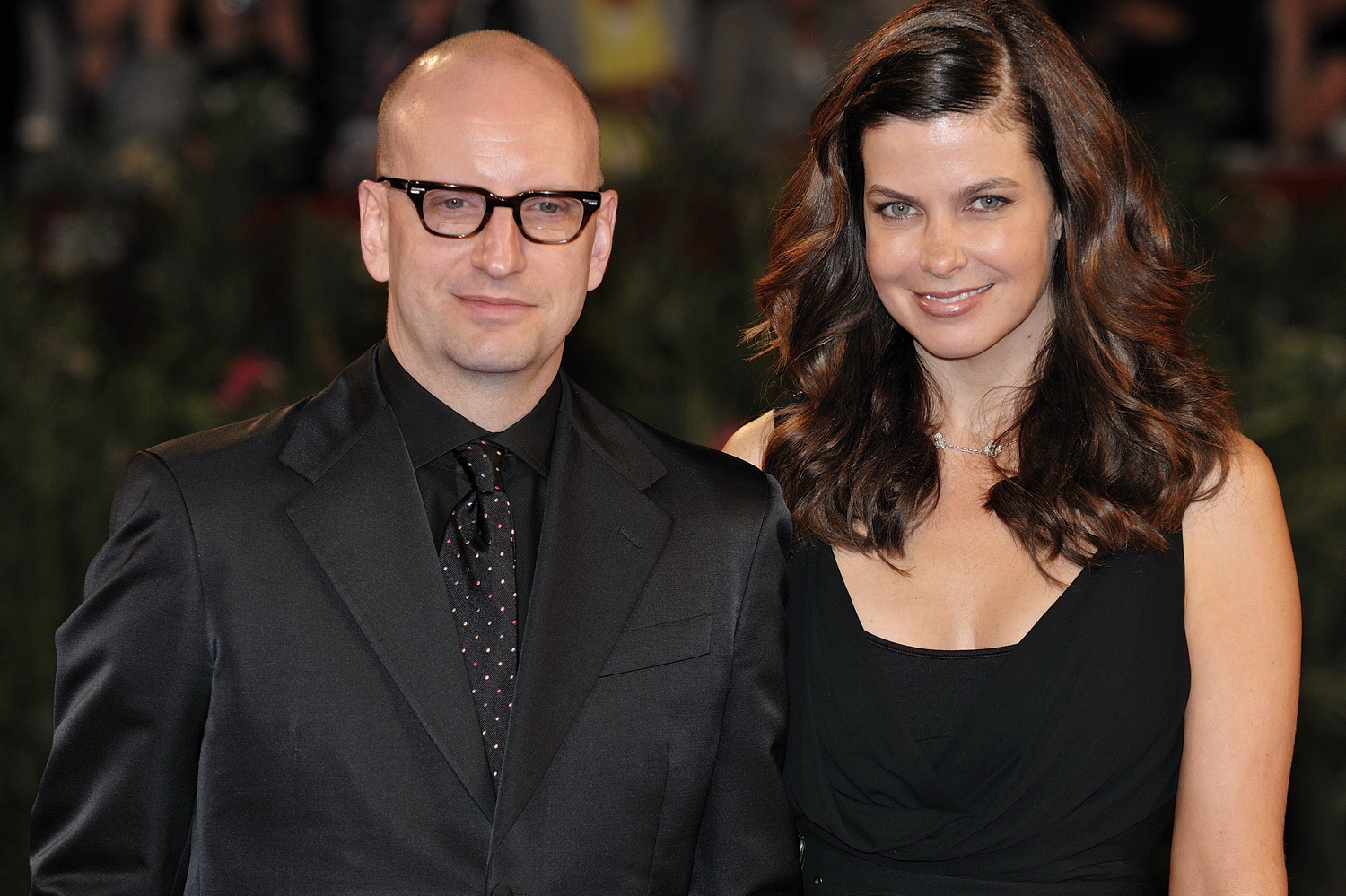
Steven Soderbergh with his wife, Jules Asner, at the 2009 Venice International Film Festival.

=== Producer only ===
- The Daytrippers (1996)
- Pleasantville (1998)
- Welcome to Collinwood (2002)
- Rumor Has It... (2005)
- Solitary Man (2009)
- Ocean's 8 (2018)
- The Report (2019)
- Divinity (2023)

=== Executive producer only ===
- Suture (1993)
- Who Is Bernard Tapie? (2001)
- Tribute (2001)
- Insomnia (2002)
- Far From Heaven (2002)
- Naqoyqatsi (2002)
- Confessions of a Dangerous Mind (2002)
- Able Edwards (2003)
- Keane (2004)
- Symbiopsychotaxiplasm: Take 2 1/2 (2005)
- The Jacket (2005)
- Good Night, and Good Luck (2005)
- Syriana (2005)
- The Big Empty (2005)
- A Scanner Darkly (2006)
- Pu-239 (2006)
- Wind Chill (2007)
- I'm Not There (2007)
- Michael Clayton (2007)
- Roman Polanski: Wanted and Desired (2008)
- Playground (2009)
- Rebecca H. (Return to the Dogs) (2010)
- We Need to Talk About Kevin (2011)
- Roman Polanski: Odd Man Out (2012)
- Citizenfour (2014)
- The King (2017)
- Perfect (2018)
- Beats (2019)
- Bill & Ted Face the Music (2020)
- The Exiles (2022)
- Is That Black Enough for You?!? (2022)
- Once Within a Time (2023)

=== Other ===
- The Hunger Games (2012) – Second unit director
- Da Sweet Blood of Jesus (2014) – Associate producer
- The Batman: Part II (2028) – Back-up director

== Short film ==
Year	Title	Director	Writer	Producer	DoP	Editor	Notes
1985	Access All Areas	Yes	No	No	No	No	
1987	Winston	Yes	Yes	No	Yes	No	
2006	Building No. 7	Yes	Yes	No	Yes	Yes	
2019	Your Life As a Spy	Yes	Yes	Yes	Yes	Yes	All credits are uncredited

== Television ==
Year	Title	Director	Executive Producer	DoP	Editor	Network	Notes
1993, 1995	Fallen Angels	Yes	No	No	No	Showtime	Episodes: "The Quiet Room" and "The Professional Man"
2003	K Street	Yes	Yes	Yes	Yes	HBO	
2005	Unscripted	No	Yes	No	No	HBO	
2011	His Way	No	Yes	No	No	HBO	TV documentary
2013	Behind the Candelabra	Yes	No	Yes	Yes	HBO	TV movie
2014–2015	The Knick	Yes	Yes	Yes	Yes	Cinemax	
2014–2017	Red Oaks	No	Yes	No	No	Amazon Prime Video	
2016–2021	The Girlfriend Experience	No	Yes	No	No	Starz	
2017	Godless	No	Yes	No	No	Netflix	
2018	Mosaic	Yes	Yes	Yes	Yes	HBO	Also a mobile app
2019	Now Apocalypse	No	Yes	No	No	Starz	
2019	Leavenworth	No	Yes	No	No	Starz	
2020	Wireless	No	Yes	No	No	Quibi	
2021	93rd Academy Awards	No	Yes	No	No	ABC	Credited as producer with Jesse Collins & Stacey Sher
2021	Finding Magic Mike	No	Yes	No	No	HBO Max	
2023	Full Circle	Yes	Yes	Yes	Yes	HBO Max	
2023	Command Z	Yes	Yes	Yes	No	Online	

== Audio commentaries ==
On his own films

- Sex, Lies, and Videotape, with filmmaker Neil LaBute
- Schizopolis
- Out of Sight, with screenwriter Scott Frank
- The Limey, with screenwriter Lem Dobbs
- Traffic, with screenwriter Stephen Gaghan
- Ocean's Eleven, with screenwriter Ted Griffin
- Full Frontal, with screenwriter Coleman Hough
- Solaris, with producer James Cameron
- Ocean's Twelve, with screenwriter George Nolfi (Blu-ray only)
- Bubble, with filmmaker Mark Romanek
- Ocean's Thirteen, with screenwriters Brian Koppelman and David Levien (Blu-ray only)
- The Girlfriend Experience, with actress Sasha Grey
- The Informant!, with screenwriter Scott Z. Burns (Blu-ray only)

On other films

- Apartment Zero, with screenwriter/producer David Koepp
- Billy Budd, with actor Terence Stamp
- Catch-22, with director Mike Nichols
- Clean, Shaven, with director Lodge Kerrigan
- The Daytrippers, with director Greg Mottola and editor Anne McCabe
- The Graduate, with director Mike Nichols
- Point Blank, with director John Boorman
- Seabiscuit, with director Gary Ross
- Suture, with directors Scott McGehee and David Siegel
- The Third Man, with screenwriter Tony Gilroy
- Who's Afraid of Virginia Woolf?, with director Mike Nichols
- The Yards, with director James Gray

== Reception ==
Critical, public and commercial reception to Soderbergh's directorial feature films as of August 29, 2022.

Year	Film	Rotten Tomatoes	Metacritic	CinemaScore	Budget	Box office
1989	Sex, Lies, and Videotape	96% (8.0/10 average rating) (52 reviews)	86 (17 reviews)	—N/a	$1.2 million	$36.7 million
1991	Kafka	50% (5.4/10 average rating) (24 reviews)	46 (17 reviews)	—N/a	$11 million	$1.1 million
1993	King of the Hill	91% (7.8/10 average rating) (33 reviews)	86 (12 reviews)	—N/a	$8 million	$1.2 million
1995	The Underneath	62% (6.1/10 average rating) (26 reviews)	69 (11 reviews)	—N/a	$6.5 million	$536,023
1996	Schizopolis	65% (6.5/10 average rating) (20 reviews)	44 (10 reviews)	—N/a	$250,000	$10,580
1996	Gray's Anatomy	59% (6.3/10 average rating) (22 reviews)	60 (14 reviews)	—N/a	$350,000	$29,090
1998	Out of Sight	94% (7.9/10 average rating) (99 reviews)	85 (30 reviews)	B−	$48 million	$77.7 million
1999	The Limey	92% (7.4/10 average rating) (84 reviews)	73 (32 reviews)	—N/a	$10 million	$3.2 million
2000	Erin Brockovich	85% (7.5/10 average rating) (149 reviews)	73 (36 reviews)	A	$52 million	$256.3 million
2000	Traffic	92% (8.0/10 average rating) (161 reviews)	86 (34 reviews)	B	$48 million	$207.5 million
2001	Ocean's Eleven	83% (7.0/10 average rating) (182 reviews)	74 (35 reviews)	B+	$85 million	$450.7 million
2002	Full Frontal	39% (5.2/10 average rating) (145 reviews)	45 (37 ratings)	—N/a	$2 million	$3.4 million
2002	Solaris	66% (6.6/10 average rating) (209 reviews)	65 (38 reviews)	F	$47 million	$30 million
2004	Ocean's Twelve	54% (5.9/10 average rating) (184 reviews)	58 (39 reviews)	B−	$110 million	$362.7 million
2005	Bubble	71% (6.3/10 average rating) (106 reviews)	63 (32 reviews)	—N/a	$1.6 million	$261,966
2006	The Good German	34% (5.1/10 average rating) (153 reviews)	49 (34 reviews)	—N/a	$30 million	$5.9 million
2007	Ocean's Thirteen	70% (6.4/10 average rating) (200 reviews)	62 (37 reviews)	B+	$85 million	$311.3 million
2008	Che: Part One (The Argentine); Che: Part Two (Guerrilla)	68% (6.5/10 average rating) (142 reviews) 79% (6.7/10 average rating) (53 reviews)	64 (24 reviews)	—N/a	$59 million	$40.8 million
2009	The Girlfriend Experience	67% (6.4/10 average rating) (141 reviews)	66 (26 reviews)	—N/a	$1.7 million	$1 million
2009	The Informant!	79% (6.8/10 average rating) (231 reviews)	66 (37 reviews)	C−	$22 million	$41.8 million
2010	And Everything is Going Fine	91% (7.8/10 average rating) (34 reviews)	76 (11 reviews)	—N/a	—N/a	$22,080
2011	Contagion	85% (7.1/10 average rating) (281 reviews)	70 (38 reviews)	B−	$60 million	$135.5 million
2012	Haywire	80% (6.8/10 average rating) (200 reviews)	67 (40 reviews)	D+	$23 million	$34.5 million
2012	Magic Mike	78% (6.8/10 average rating) (217 reviews)	72 (38 reviews)	B	$7 million	$167.2 million
2013	Side Effects	81% (7.3/10 average rating) (223 reviews)	75 (40 reviews)	B	$30 million	$66.7 million
2013	Behind the Candelabra	94% (8.1/10 average rating) (108 reviews)	83 (30 reviews)	—N/a	$23 million	—N/a
2017	Logan Lucky	92% (7.5/10 average rating) (290 reviews)	78 (51 reviews)	B	$29 million	$48.5 million
2018	Unsane	80% (6.7/10 average rating) (239 reviews)	63 (45 reviews)	B−	$1.5 million	$14.3 million
2019	High Flying Bird	91% (7.4/10 average rating) (137 reviews)	78 (23 reviews)	—N/a	$2 million	—N/a
2019	The Laundromat	41% (5.5/10 average rating) (174 reviews)	57 (37 reviews)	—N/a	—N/a	—N/a
2020	Let Them All Talk	87% (7.1/10 average rating) (119 reviews)	72 (31 reviews)	—N/a	—N/a	—N/a
2021	No Sudden Move	92% (7.8/10 average rating) (140 reviews)	76 (38 reviews)	—N/a	—N/a	—N/a
2022	Kimi	92% (7.5/10 average rating) (120 reviews)	79 (27 reviews)	—N/a	—N/a	—N/a
2023	Magic Mike's Last Dance	48% (5.4/10 average rating) (222 reviews)	52 (54 reviews)	—N/a	$45 million	$56.3 million
2024	Presence	87% (7.1/10 average rating) (252 reviews)	77 (53 reviews)	C+	$2 million	$10.6 million
2025	Black Bag	96% (8.1/10 average rating) (292 reviews)	85 (53 reviews)	B	$60 million	$43.9 million
2025	The Christophers	95% (7.8/10 average rating) (174 reviews)	79 (42 reviews)			$4.8 million

As of 2018, Soderbergh's entire feature filmography has grossed over US$2.2 billion worldwide in sales. Ocean's Eleven, Ocean's Thirteen, Out of Sight, Logan Lucky and No Sudden Move were named among the "88 Best Heist Movies of All Time" by Rotten Tomatoes. His film Out of Sight was listed as one of the best movies of the 1990s by Rolling Stone.
