= Steven Soderbergh's unrealized projects =

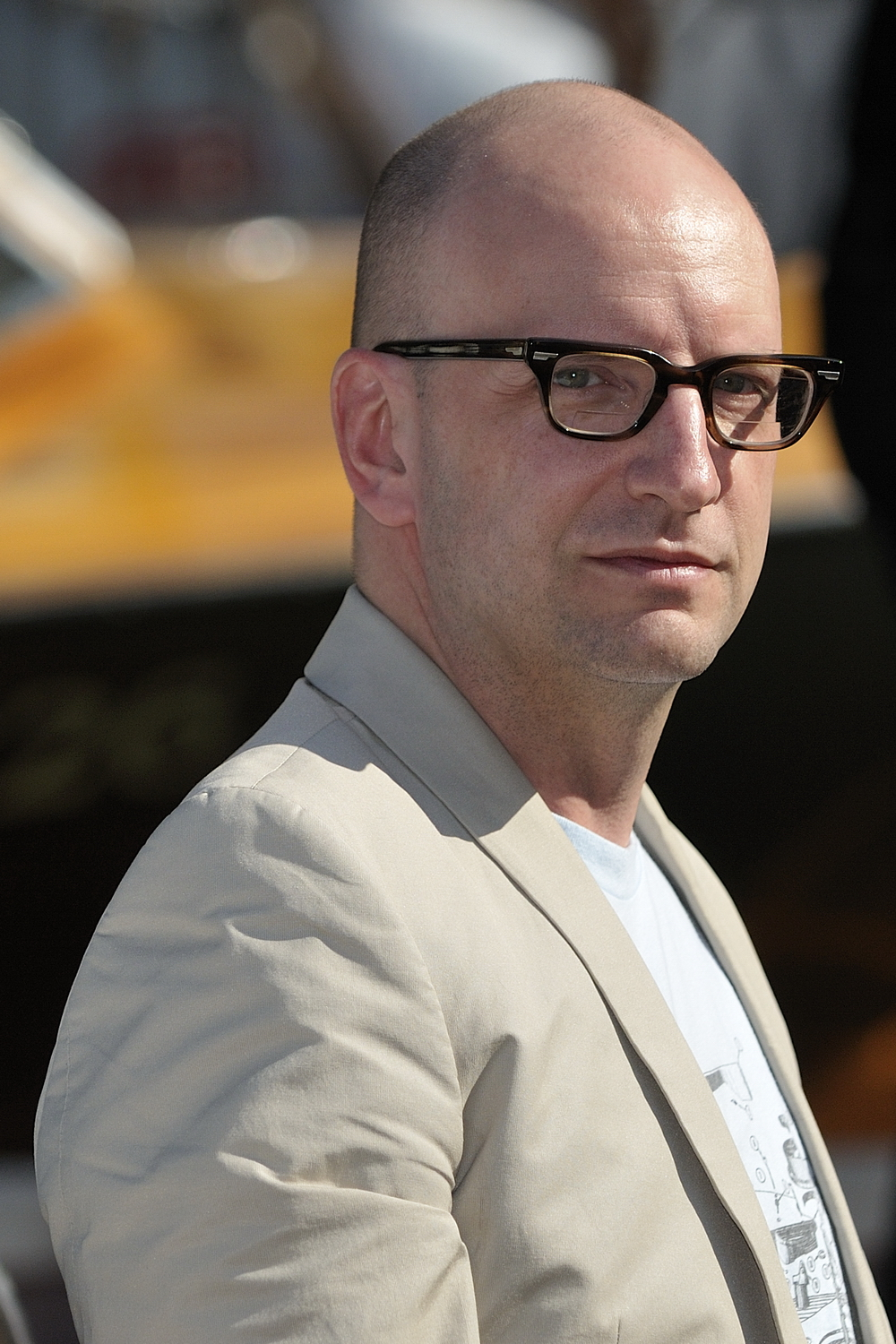
Soderbergh in 2009

During his long career, American filmmaker Steven Soderbergh has worked on several projects which never progressed beyond the pre-production stage under his direction. Some of these projects fell into development hell, were officially canceled, were in development limbo or would see life under a different production team.

== 1980s ==
=== Edward Ford ===
In the 1980s, Soderbergh was one of many directors attached to direct Lem Dobbs's screenplay Edward Ford, a drama about an obsessive-compulsive disorder patient trying to become a Hollywood actor, for 20th Century Fox.

=== The Last Ship ===
After the success of Sex, Lies, and Videotape, Soderbergh had planned on adapting the post-apocalyptic novel The Last Ship by William Brinkley as his next film. It was set to be produced by Sydney Pollack. After several unsatisfactory screenplay drafts however, Soderbergh would ultimately choose to abandon the project in favor of making Kafka.

== 1990s ==
=== The Crowded Room ===
In 1997, Soderbergh was attached to direct The Crowded Room, based on Daniel Keyes' non-fiction novel The Minds of Billy Milligan, after the rights were optioned by Warner Bros. He wanted to cast Sean Penn in his version.

== 2000s ==
=== A Confederacy of Dunces ===
On June 23, 2003, Soderbergh was set to co-write with Scott Kramer the screenplay for David Gordon Green's adaptation of the novel A Confederacy of Dunces.

=== Cleo ===
On October 23, 2008, it was announced that Soderbergh was planning to direct a 3D live action rock and roll musical titled Cleo, with Catherine Zeta-Jones and Hugh Jackman portraying Cleopatra and Marc Antony respectively; Gregory Jacobs and Casey Silver signed on to produce the film. The music for the projected $30 million production was written by the indie rock band Guided by Voices, with screenplay by James Greer, a former bass player for the group. In December that year, Ray Winstone was in talks to portray Julius Caesar. On January 2, 2009, Jackman dropped out of the project. On September 4, 2009, Soderbergh weighed the possibility of making Cleo or a proposed Liberace biopic, which became Behind the Candelabra, before retiring. On June 16, 2012, Zeta-Jones admitted on The View that she and Soderbergh would try to make it as a Broadway stage show.

=== Untitled Leni Riefenstahl biopic ===
In 2008, while filming The Informant!, Soderbergh and Scott Z. Burns were writing a script for a biopic about Leni Riefenstahl, but ultimately chose to make Contagion after weighing the commercial prospects between the projects.

=== The Limey sequel ===
On July 12, 2009, Jules Asner revealed on Adam Carolla's podcast that Soderbergh wanted to make a sequel to The Limey, and Soderbergh revealed the following September that he and Lem Dobbs were writing the screenplay with a focus on new characters while collaborating on Haywire.

== 2010s ==
=== Making Jack Falcone ===
On March 4, 2010, Soderbergh was set to produce the biographical crime film Making Jack Falcone with Peter Buchman writing the screenplay and Benicio Del Toro set to portray FBI agent Jack Garcia for Paramount Pictures.

=== The Man from U.N.C.L.E. ===
On November 16, 2010, Soderbergh was set to direct the film adaptation of The Man From U.N.C.L.E. with Scott Z. Burns writing the screenplay and John Davis and David Dobkin producing. In 2011, George Clooney was set to star, but left the due to a back injury. On October 20, 2011, Bradley Cooper was set to replace Clooney, but in November that year, Soderbergh dropped out as director and Guy Ritchie was hired to replace him.

=== Planet Kill ===
In February 2018, Soderbergh was set to produce and possibly direct Scott Z. Burns and James Greer's original action thriller Planet Kill, with Studio 8 set to produce.

=== Emin Pasha TV miniseries ===
In April 2018, Soderbergh was in the process of developing a six-part miniseries written by Lem Dobbs about the life of 19th-century adventurer Emin Pasha.

=== Florida Man TV series ===
In 2019, Soderbergh was set to produce Florida Man, an Elmore Leonard-style TV series with BenDavid Grabinski attached as the showrunner after replacing Michael Waldron. On June 4, 2021, the project evolved into a buddy cop movie, then retitled Gator and the Egg, with Grabinski writing the screenplay, Stacey Sher, Michael Shamberg, John Henson and Soderbergh producing, and Tricia Brock set to direct through Amazon Studios.

== 2020s ==
=== High Flying Bird sequel ===
On May 19, 2020, Soderbergh was possibly going to direct and produce a sequel to High Flying Bird that Andre Holland was working on for Netflix. On September 24, 2020, Soderbergh confirmed that the sequel's screenplay was written.

=== The Knick TV series spinoff ===
On September 24, 2020, Soderbergh was set to only executive produce a spinoff of The Knick starring Andre Holland, with Jack Amiel and Michael Begler writing the series and Barry Jenkins attached to direct and produce.

=== Contagion sequel ===
On December 30, 2020, Soderbergh announced that a "philosophical sequel" to his film Contagion was in the works.

=== The Hunt for Ben Solo ===
In October 2025, actor Adam Driver revealed that Soderbergh had secretly developed a spin-off of Star Wars: The Rise of Skywalker called The Hunt for Ben Solo, which focused on Driver's character of Kylo Ren. Soderbergh and Logan Lucky writer Rebecca Blunt co-wrote the story, while Scott Z. Burns wrote the script. Lucasfilm loved the idea but The Walt Disney Company rejected the script, as Bob Iger and Alan Bergman didn't find it believable how the character would be still alive after the events of the Star Wars sequel trilogy.

== See also ==
- Steven Soderbergh filmography
