= List of awards and nominations received by Steven Soderbergh =

Steven Soderbergh awards and nominations
- Soderbergh in 2021
Awards and nominations
Award	Wins	Nominations
Academy Awards	1	3
BAFTA Awards	0	3
Critics' Choice	1	1
Emmy Awards	2	9
Golden Globe Awards	0	3
Grammy Awards	0	1

Totals (Note: Certain award groups do not simply award one winner. They acknowledge several different recipients, have runners-up, and have third place. Since this is a specific recognition and is different from losing an award, runner-up mentions are considered wins in this award tally. For simplification and to avoid errors, each award in this list has been presumed to have had a prior nomination.)
- Wins: 8
- Nominations: 49

This is a list of awards and nominations received by American filmmaker Steven Soderbergh. He is known for his work in film and television, and has received accolades including an Academy Award, the Cannes Film Festival's Palme d'Or, a Critics' Choice Movie Award, two Directors Guild of America Awards and two Primetime Emmy Awards as well as nominations for three BAFTA Awards, three Golden Globe Awards and a Grammy Award.

Soderbergh began his career directing music videos including for the band Yes, directing their music video 9012Live (1987) which earned him a nomination for the Best Music Video, Long Form. He then had his film breakthrough with the independent drama Sex, Lies, and Videotape (1989) which earned the Palme d'Or at the Cannes Film Festival and the Independent Spirit Award for Best Director as well as nominations for the Academy Award for Best Original Screenplay, the BAFTA Award for Best Original Screenplay, and the Golden Globe Award for Best Screenplay.

In 2000, he directed and earned acclaim for directing two films: the biographical legal drama Erin Brokovich and the crime drama Traffic. For the later, he won the Academy Award for Best Director, the Critics' Choice Movie Award for Best Director and the New York Film Critics Circle Award for Best Director and for both films, he earned nominations for the BAFTA Award for Best Director, the Directors Guild of America Award for Outstanding Directorial Achievement in Theatrical Feature Film, and the Golden Globe Award for Best Director.

On television, he directed the HBO television film Behind the Candelabra (2013), for which he won the Primetime Emmy Award for Outstanding Directing for a Limited Series or Movie. He also directed episodes of the Cinemax period medical drama The Knick (2014–2015) for which he was nominated for two Primetime Emmy Awards for Outstanding Directing for a Drama Series. He produced the Netflix limited Western series Godless (2018) for which he was nominated for the Primetime Emmy Award for Outstanding Limited or Anthology Series

== Major associations ==
=== Academy Awards ===
Year	Category	Nominated work	Result	Ref.
1989	Best Original Screenplay	Sex, Lies, and Videotape	Nominated	
2000	Best Director	Erin Brokovich	Won	
2000	Best Director	Traffic	Nominated	

=== BAFTA Awards ===
Year	Category	Nominated work	Result	Ref.
British Academy Film Awards
1989	Best Original Screenplay	Sex, Lies, and Videotape	Nominated	
2000	Best Director	Erin Brokovich	Nominated	
2000	Best Director	Traffic	Nominated	

=== Critics' Choice Awards ===
Year	Category	Nominated work	Result	Ref.
Critics' Choice Movie Awards
2000	Best Director	Erin Brockovich / Traffic	Won	

=== Emmy Awards ===
Year	Category	Nominated work	Result	Ref.
Primetime Emmy Awards
2009	Outstanding Documentary or Nonfiction Special	Roman Polanski: Wanted and Desired	Nominated	
2011	Outstanding Documentary or Nonfiction Special	His Way	Nominated	
2013	Outstanding Directing for a Limited Series or Movie	Behind the Candelabra	Won	
2013	Outstanding Cinematography for a Limited Series or Movie	Behind the Candelabra	Nominated	
2013	Outstanding Picture Editing for a Limited Series or Movie	Behind the Candelabra	Nominated	
2015	Outstanding Directing for a Drama Series	The Knick (episode: "Method and Madness")	Nominated	
2016	Outstanding Direction of a Drama Series	The Knick (episode: "This Is All We Are")	Nominated	
2018	Outstanding Limited Series	Godless	Nominated	
2021	Outstanding Variety Special (Live)	The Oscars	Nominated	

=== Golden Globe Awards ===
Year	Category	Nominated work	Result	Ref.
1989	Best Original Screenplay	Sex, Lies, and Videotape	Nominated	
2000	Best Director	Erin Brokovich	Nominated	
2000	Best Director	Traffic	Nominated	

=== Grammy Awards ===
Year	Category	Nominated work	Result	Ref.
1987	Best Music Video, Long Form	Yes: 9012Live	Nominated	

== Miscellaneous awards ==
Award	Year	Category	Work	Result	Ref.
Cannes Film Festival	1989	Palme d'Or	Sex, Lies, and Videotape	Won	
Cannes Film Festival	1989	FIPRESCI Prize	Sex, Lies, and Videotape	Won	
Cannes Film Festival	1993	Palme d'Or	King of the Hill	Nominated	
Cannes Film Festival	2008	Palme d'Or	Che Parts One and Two	Nominated	
Cannes Film Festival	2013	Palme d'Or	Behind the Candelabra	Nominated	
Cannes Film Festival	2013	Queer Palme	Behind the Candelabra	Nominated	
Cannes Film Festival	2026	Documentary Prize	John Lennon: His Last Interview	Nominated	
César Awards	1990	Best Foreign Film	Sex, Lies, and Videotape	Nominated	
César Awards	2002	Best Foreign Film	Traffic	Nominated	
César Awards	2003	Best Foreign Film	Ocean's Eleven	Nominated	
Berlin International Film Festival	2001	Golden Bear	Traffic	Nominated	
Berlin International Film Festival	2003	Golden Bear	Solaris	Nominated	
Berlin International Film Festival	2007	Golden Bear	The Good German	Nominated	
Berlin International Film Festival	2013	Golden Bear	Side Effects	Nominated	
Directors Guild of America Awards	2000	Outstanding Directorial Achievement in Motion Pictures	Erin Brokovich	Nominated	
Directors Guild of America Awards	2000	Outstanding Directorial Achievement in Motion Pictures	Traffic	Nominated	
Directors Guild of America Awards	2013	Outstanding Directorial Achievement in Mini-Series and TV Movies	Behind the Candelabra	Won	
Directors Guild of America Awards	2013	Robert Aldrich Award		Honored	
Directors Guild of America Awards	2015	Outstanding Directorial Achievement in Television and Mini-Series	The Knick (episode: "Williams and Walker")	Nominated	
Independent Spirit Awards	1989	Best Director	Sex, Lies, and Videotape	Won	
Independent Spirit Awards	1999	Best Director	The Limey	Nominated	
Independent Spirit Awards	2006	Best Director	Bubble	Nominated	
Sundance Film Festival	1989	Grand Jury Prize	Sex, Lies, and Videotape	Nominated	
Sundance Film Festival	1989	Audience Award	Sex, Lies, and Videotape	Won	
Venice International Film Festival	2002	Upstream Prize	Full Frontal	Nominated	
Venice International Film Festival	2019	Golden Lion	The Laundromat	Nominated	
Writers Guild of America Award	1989	Best Original Screenplay	Sex, Lies, and Videotape	Nominated	
