= Sarah Flack =

American film editor

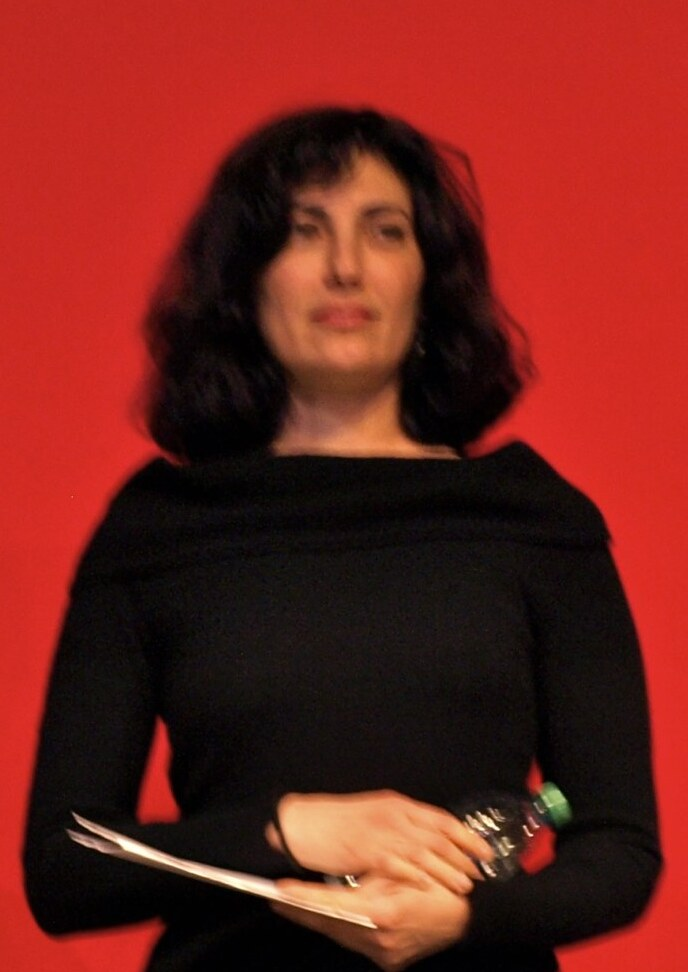
Sarah Flack (2015)

Sarah Flack is an American film editor. She has frequently worked with American independent film directors Steven Soderbergh (Schizopolis, The Limey, Full Frontal, Accidentally Brave) and Sofia Coppola (Lost in Translation, Marie Antoinette, Somewhere, The Bling Ring, The Beguiled, On the Rocks, Priscilla). Flack's work on Lost in Translation won her the BAFTA Award for Best Editing. The film went on to win numerous other awards, including a Golden Globe Award for Best Motion Picture – Musical or Comedy and the Independent Spirit Award for Best Film. She won a Primetime Emmy Award and an American Cinema Editors Eddie award with Robert Pulcini for co-editing the HBO film Cinema Verite, and was nominated for an American Cinema Editors Eddie award for On the Rocks.

Flack began her career working as a production assistant on the film Kafka where she first met film director Steven Soderbergh. After assistant editing on a handful of other independent films, Flack was hired by Soderbergh to edit his self-financed experimental film, Schizopolis. She is represented by CAA.

== Filmography ==
- Kafka (1991) (production assistant)
- Swing Kids (1993) (apprentice editor)
- Black Beauty (1994) (assistant editor)
- White Man's Burden (1995) (assistant editor)
- Romeo + Juliet (1996) (second assistant editor)
- Schizopolis (1996) (uncredited editor)
- The Limey (1999) (editor)
- Lush (1999) (editor)
- Book of Shadows: Blair Witch 2 (2000) (editor)
- Full Frontal (2002) (editor)
- Swimfan (2002) (editor)
- The Guys (2002) (editor)
- Lost in Translation (2003) (editor)
- November (2004) (additional editor)
- Looking for Kitty (2004) (editor)
- The Baxter (2005) (editor)
- Dave Chappelle's Block Party (2005) (co-editor)
- Marie Antoinette (2006) (editor)
- Dan in Real Life (2007) (editor)
- Away We Go (2009) (editor)
- Somewhere (2010) (editor)
- Cinema Verite (2011) (editor)
- The Bling Ring (2013) (editor)
- A Very Murray Christmas (2015) (editor)
- The Beguiled (2017) (editor)
- Lost Girls & Love Hotels (2020) (editor)
- On the Rocks (2020) (editor)
- Priscilla 2023 (editor)

== Awards and nominations ==
Awards Won:

- Lost in Translation (2003) - BAFTA Award - "Best Editing"
- Cinema Verite (2011) - Primetime Emmy Awards - Outstanding Single-Camera Picture Editing for a Miniseries or a Movie
- Cinema Verite (2011) - American Cinema Editors Eddie Awards - "Best Edited Miniseries or Motion Picture for Television"

Nominations:

- Lost in Translation (2003) - American Cinema Editors Eddie Awards - "Best Edited Feature Film - Comedy or Musical"
- The Limey (2000) - Online Film Critics Society Awards - "Best Editing"
- On the Rocks (2020) - American Cinema Editors Eddie Awards - Best Edited Feature Film - Comedy

Awards and achievements
Preceded by Daniel Rezende for Cidade de Deus	BAFTA Award for Best Editing for Lost in Translation; 2003	Succeeded by Valdís Óskarsdóttir for Eternal Sunshine of the Spotless Mind
