= Guy Fithen =

British actor and screenwriter

Guy L. Fithen (born 1962 in Oxford) is a British actor and screenwriter best known for his roles as a pirate.

== Career ==
A graduate of the London Academy of Music and Dramatic Art, Fithen worked as a stage actor in the Royal Shakespeare Company, in particular as the Keeper of the Tower in Antony Sher's 1985 staging of William Shakespeare's Richard III.

His film career included roles as first mate Rhince in The Voyage of the Dawn Treader, an adaptation of C. S. Lewis's novel of the same name and third in the 1989 BBC miniseries The Chronicles of Narnia, and as the pirate Thatcher, playing alongside Gabriel Byrne in the 1990 Disney film Shipwrecked.

== Filmography ==
Year	Title	Role	Notes
1989	Prince Caspian and the Voyage of the Dawn Treader	Rhince	Miniseries
1990	Bergerac	Brian	Episode: The Messenger Boy
1990	Shipwrecked	Thatcher	
1991	King Ralph	Bouncer	
1991	Kafka	Friend of Kafka	
1992	The Darling Buds of May	Kurt	Episode: The Season of Heavenly Gifts: Part 2
