= Steven Soderbergh bibliography =

Books and essays about Steven Soderbergh

A list of books and essays about Steven Soderbergh:

- Baker, Aaron (2011). Steven Soderbergh. University of Illinois Press. ISBN 978-0-252-03605-7.
- Kaufman, Anthony (2002). Steven Soderbergh: Interviews. Univ. Press of Mississippi. ISBN 978-1-57806-429-8.
- deWaard, Andrew (20 August 2013). The Cinema of Steven Soderbergh: Indie Sex, Corporate Lies, and Digital Videotape. Columbia University Press. ISBN 978-0-231-85039-1.
- Gallagher, Mark (15 April 2013). Another Steven Soderbergh Experience: Authorship and Contemporary Hollywood. University of Texas Press. ISBN 978-0-292-74421-9.
- Palmer, R. Barton; Sanders, Steven (January 2011). The Philosophy of Steven Soderbergh. University Press of Kentucky. ISBN 978-0-8131-2662-3.
