= Schizopolis =

1996 film by Steven Soderbergh

- DVD cover of the Criterion release
- Directed by: Steven Soderbergh
- Written by: Steven Soderbergh
- Produced by: John Hardy; John Re
- Starring: Steven Soderbergh; Betsy Brantley; David Jensen
- Cinematography: Steven Soderbergh
- Edited by: Steven Soderbergh; Sarah Flack
- Music by: Cliff Martinez; Steven Soderbergh
- Distributed by: Northern Arts
- Release dates: May 18, 1996 (Cannes); September 13, 1996 (TIFF); April 9, 1997 (U.S.); March 12, 1999 (UK)
- Running time: 96 min.
- Country: United States
- Languages: English; Japanese; Italian; French
- Budget: $250,000
- Box office: $10,580

Schizopolis (also known as Steven Soderbergh's Schizopolis) is a 1996 surrealist experimental comedy film with a non-linear narrative written and directed by Steven Soderbergh.

== Plot ==
Although the film does not have a linear plot, a structure exists, telling the same story from three different perspectives. At the beginning, Soderbergh speaks to the audience in a style meant to evoke Cecil B. DeMille's introduction to The Ten Commandments.

Fletcher Munson is an office employee working under Theodore Azimuth Schwitters, the leader of a self-help company known as Eventualism. The first part of the film is seen from Fletcher's perspective, seeing the underlying meaning in everything. He pays more attention to meaning, rather than what is said. He shows less and less attention to other people, to the point where he comes home and communicates with his wife by describing what they are saying. When Fletcher's co-worker Lester Richards dies, Fletcher takes his job as speechwriter. His personal life suffers because of this. He becomes more detached from his wife, who copes by having an affair.

Meanwhile, Elmo Oxygen, an exterminator, goes from house to house, bedding the housewives who work for Schwitters. In each house he takes pictures of his genitals using cameras he finds. Elmo and the women speak in a nonsensical code. Fletcher's key will not work in his car door. He looks around to find that his actual car (parked two spots away) is an exact match for the one he is trying to get into. He goes to enter his car when he sees a man who is his exact double get into the car he just tried to enter. Fletcher follows his doppelgänger home, closes his eyes, and becomes him.

Next we follow Fletcher's doppelgänger, Dr. Jeffrey Korchek, a dentist. He always wears a jogging suit. He is also a fan of Muzak, and is the mystery man that Fletcher's wife has been sleeping with. Korchek suggests she leave Fletcher for him.

The next day, Korchek has breakfast with his heroin-addicted brother, who asks to stay with Korchek and for money. Korchek says that his brother should not be dealing with drug dealers and that he can get him drugs. Korchek goes to work, where he meets Attractive Woman Number 2, Mrs. Munson's doppelgänger. Korchek falls instantly in love and writes her a letter professing such. He leaves the note and goes home, where he sees a car in the driveway. It is Mrs. Munson, who has left Fletcher. Korchek admits that he has fallen in love with someone else. Mrs. Munson is upset and leaves.

The next day Korchek gets to work and is confronted by a man who says "Your brother, eight hours, fifteen thousand dollars." Almost all of his dialog consists of these three commands. Korchek goes into the office and finds a letter from a law firm representing Attractive Woman Number 2, who is filing a sexual harassment suit against him. He discovers that his brother has stolen all of his money. Korchek leaves work. Korchek is shot dead. A couple following Elmo approach him, to convince him to stop playing his role in the film, in order to become a star in an action show. Unlike the rest of the film, Elmo's storyline moves forward in time.

Finally we see the perspective of Mrs. Munson. We move through the storyline, seeing her experiences with Fletcher and Dr. Korchek and being a mom. The events are the same but Fletcher and Korchek speak foreign languages, similar to the "generic greetings" from earlier. Once Mrs. Munson leaves Korchek, she reconciles with Fletcher and they go home. Fletcher finishes Schwitters' speech. Schwitters mounts the podium and gives the oration. After Schwitters acknowledges the applause with a "Thank you," Elmo bursts in and shoots him in the shoulder. Schwitters survives and Elmo is arrested and interrogated.

In a shopping mall Fletcher narrates events from the rest of his life. A man clad only in a black T-shirt appears at the beginning and conclusion of the film, being chased by men in white coats through a field. In the beginning, the T-shirt sports the title of the film; later, it says "The End." Then, Soderbergh returns in front of a blank movie screen and asks if there are any questions. After offering several responses he walks offstage as the camera pulls back to reveal he's been talking to an empty auditorium. The film has no beginning or end credits, although the fictitious persons and copyright disclaimers flash for a single frame to conclude the film.

== Cast ==
- Steven Soderbergh as Fletcher Munson / Dr. Jeffrey Korchek
- Betsy Brantley as Mrs. Munson / Attractive Woman #2
- David Jensen as Elmo Oxygen
- Mike Malone as T. Azimuth Schwitters
- Eddie Jemison as Nameless Numberhead Man
- Scott Allen as Right-Hand Man
- Katherine LaNasa as Attractive Woman #1
- Mary Soderbergh as Document Delivery Woman
- Trip Hamilton as Dr. Korchek's Brother
- Ann Hamilton as Schwitters' Wife
- Rodger Kamenetz as Cardiologist

== Production ==
Schizopolis was shot in Soderbergh's hometown of Baton Rouge, Louisiana over a period of nine months, beginning in March 1995, on a budget of only $250,000. Due to Soderbergh's desire to keep the film simple, many people had multiple duties (i.e. David Jensen played Elmo Oxygen as well as being the casting director and key grip) and many friends and relatives were hired in various capacities.

Betsy Brantley, who plays Mrs. Munson, is Steven Soderbergh's ex-wife in real-life. Soderbergh himself took the lead role, instead of hiring a professional actor, in part because, as he said, "There was just nobody I knew that I could make that demand of - come and work for free for nine months whenever I feel like it in Baton Rouge!"

== Interpretations ==
Several interpretations suggest that the film is exploring certain themes. One such theme is lack of communication: Munson and his wife only engage in templates of speech, such as "Generic greeting!" and "Generic greeting returned!" Another theme is the idea of social restraint versus internal thought: at Lester Richards' funeral, the priest begins the eulogy "Lester Richards is dead, and aren't you glad it wasn't you?" Interpretations differ greatly and the narrative jokes about its own apparent lack of meaning; at one point in the middle of the film a written message appears on a tree trunk stating "IDEA MISSING."

== Reception ==
=== Release ===
The film premiered at the Cannes Film Festival as a film surprise on May 18, 1996, where it was poorly received. This prompted the filmmakers to add the Cecil B. DeMille inspired introduction and conclusion in the theater as a way to signal to the viewers that the film was "ironical and self-serving". Schizopolis was given a limited theatrical release, as it was considered too odd for mainstream audiences. The film found an appreciative small audience and was included in the Criterion Collection, a specialist DVD distributor, which includes two audio commentaries, one of which consists of Soderbergh interviewing himself for the duration of the film.

=== Critical reception ===
Reviews of the film were mixed; it received a 70% rating at review aggregator Rotten Tomatoes from 20 reviews. Metacritic, which uses a weighted average, assigned the film a score of 44 out of 100, based on 10 critics, indicating "mixed or average" reviews. Roger Ebert wrote that Schizopolis was "a truly inexplicable film...which had audiences filing out with sad, thoughtful faces". Leonard Maltin gave the film a more favorable rating of three stars out of four, and wrote in his Leonard Maltin's Movie Guide, "A broad-ranging jab at modern society and its ills, its tone arch, its technique one of non sequiturs, and its audience likely to be small. But if you latch onto it early enough, you may find (as we did) that it's fun — and funny — to watch."
