= The Girlfriend Experience =

2009 film by Steven Soderbergh

- Theatrical release poster
- Directed by: Steven Soderbergh
- Written by: Brian Koppelman; David Levien
- Produced by: Gregory Jacobs; Todd Wagner
- Starring: Sasha Grey; Chris Santos; Glenn Kenny; Peter Zizzo
- Cinematography: Peter Andrews
- Edited by: Mary Ann Bernard
- Music by: Ross Godfrey
- Production companies: 2929 Productions; Extension 765
- Distributed by: Magnolia Pictures
- Release dates: January 20, 2009 (Sundance); May 22, 2009 (United States)
- Running time: 77 minutes
- Country: United States
- Language: English
- Budget: $1.7 million
- Box office: $1 million

The Girlfriend Experience is a 2009 American slice-of-life drama film directed by Steven Soderbergh, written by Brian Koppelman and David Levien, and starring Sasha Grey. It was shot in New York City, and a rough cut was screened at the Sundance Film Festival in January 2009. The film was also made available on Amazon Video on Demand as a pre-theatrical rental.

Soderbergh mentioned Michelangelo Antonioni's Red Desert and Ingmar Bergman's Cries and Whispers as influences. The film was produced for $1.3 million and was shot with a relatively inexpensive Red One camera.

== Plot ==
In the days leading up to the 2008 presidential election, a high-end Manhattan escort meets the challenges of her real life relationships, her clients, and her work. Chelsea (real name Christine) specializes in offering girlfriend experiences. She finds that lately her clients are spending less and less on her services, and are troubled by the Great Recession, a topic they raise frequently in her company. She is also interviewed by a journalist, who quizzes her about her work and personal life. She goes from client to client performing her services. The film contrasts Chelsea's experience with her clients with her boyfriend Chris, a personal trainer at a costly gym who spends his time talking up to his wealthier male clients.

A married screenwriter appears as a potential new client for Chelsea and proposes that she go away with him for the weekend. Initially intending to reject him, Chelsea starts to feel drawn to him because their birthdays coincide together well, as she is an avid reader of "personology" books and thinks their connection shouldn't be something to miss. This creates a fight with Chris, who berates her over her eagerness to meet with the man, as "going away" with clients is a boundary in their relationship. Chris is invited by one of his clients to join him and other finance men on a trip to Las Vegas. While he struggles to leverage a better position in his current gym and others, Chelsea also feels the stress of the job, especially with the coming of a new girl that her own clients start to favor.

== Cast ==
- Sasha Grey as Christine, alias Chelsea
- Chris Santos as Chris
- Emma Lahana as Adrian
- Philip Eytan as Philip
- Timothy Davis as Tim
- Peter Zizzo as Zizzo
- Glenn Kenny as "The Erotic Connoisseur"
- Vincent Dellacera as Chelsea's Driver
- Kimberly Magness as Happy Hour
- Mark Jacobson as Interviewer
- Kenneth Myers as Craft Steak Maître d’
- Michael Sugar as “Sugar”
- Daniel Algrant as Dan

== Reception ==
As of June 2020, the film has a 67% approval rating on the review aggregator site Rotten Tomatoes based on 138 reviews with an average rating of 6.4/10. The website's critics consensus states: "Steven Soderbergh's latest lo-fi production is strikingly crafted but emotionally vague". Metacritic, which uses a weighted average, assigned the film a score of 66 out of 100, based on 26 critics, indicating "generally favorable" reviews.

Roger Ebert rated the film four out of four stars, saying "This film is true about human nature. It clearly sees needs and desires. It is not universal, but within its particular focus, it is unrelenting."

On the opposite end of the spectrum, David Edelstein of New York Magazine complained that "most of the dialogue is listless, and no matter how much Soderbergh snips and stitches, the movie is a corpse with twitching limbs." Luke Davies, critic for The Monthly, wrote that the film is "disposable and pretentious" and "is shot sombrely and austerely, in a style that might be described as 'vacuous chic'" and concluded that "as a film in which a porn star's presence is a fundamental marketing hook, it is masturbation."

== Television series ==
In June 2014, Starz committed to a 13-episode order for a new television series, based on the film, with Soderbergh and Philip Fleishman as executive producers. Lodge Kerrigan and Amy Seimetz co-wrote and directed all 13 episodes. Though the main character uses the same name as Sasha Grey’s character in the film, Grey does not appear in the series. Riley Keough starred as the new lead, described by Soderbergh as "a new character on a new trajectory". Season 2 featured new stories focusing on two different sets of characters. Season 3 was announced in July by Starz. The third season, featuring Julia Goldani Telles in the lead, premiered on May 2, 2021.
