= Steven Soderbergh =

American filmmaker (born 1963)

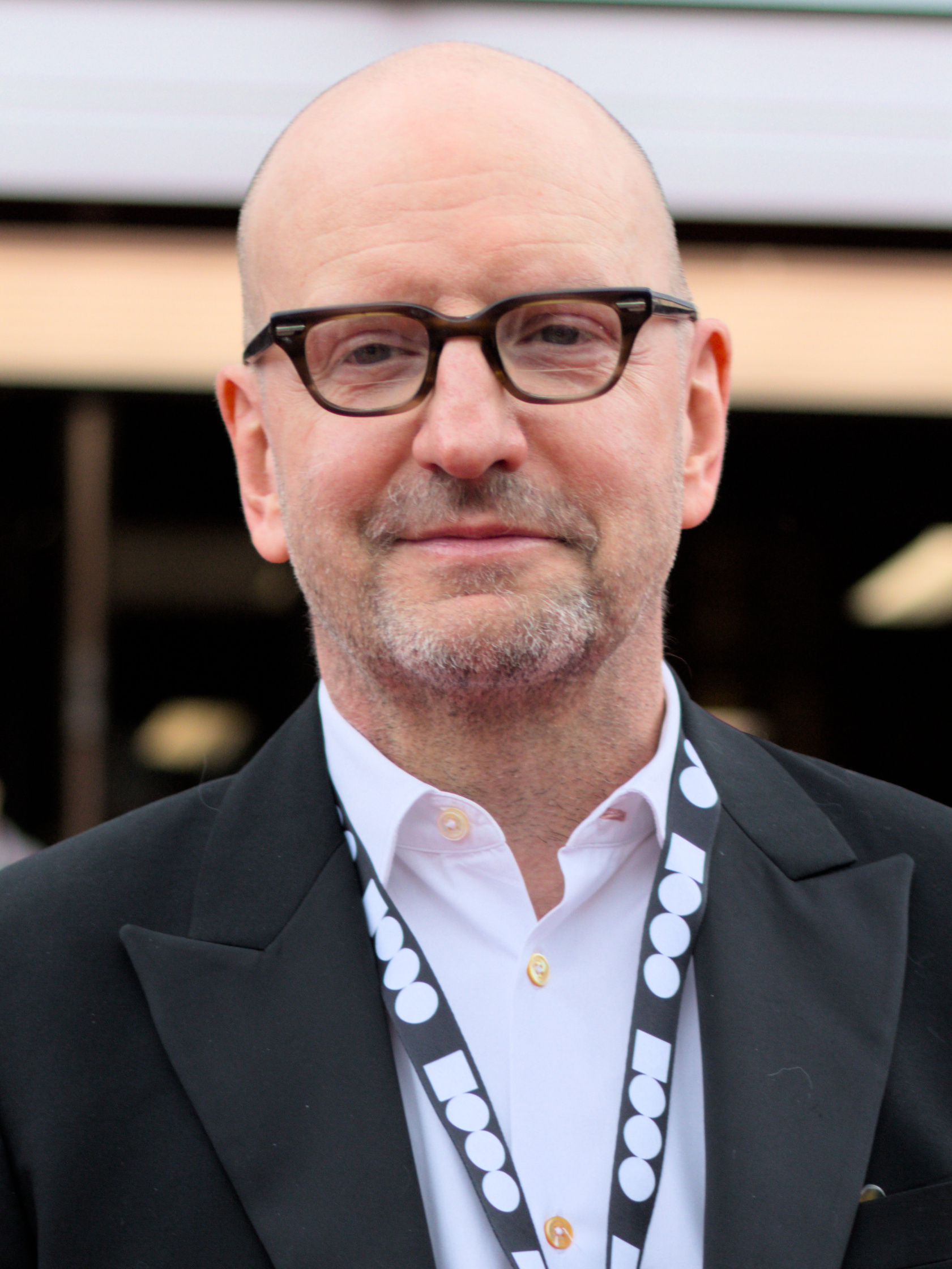
- Soderbergh in 2024
- Born: Steven Andrew Soderbergh; January 14, 1963 (age 63); Atlanta, Georgia, U.S.
- Other names: Sam Lowry; Peter Andrews; Mary Ann Bernard
- Occupations: Film director; film producer; screenwriter; cinematographer; film editor
- Years active: 1981–present
- Works: Filmography
- Movement: Independent cinema
- Spouses: Betsy Brantley (m. 1989; div. 1994) Jules Asner (m. 2003)
- Children: 2

Steven Andrew Soderbergh (/ˈsoʊdərˌbɜːrɡ/ SOH-dər-burg; born January 14, 1963) is an American filmmaker, cinematographer, and editor. A pioneer of modern independent cinema, Soderbergh later drew acclaim for formally inventive films made within the studio system. His films have grossed over US$2.2 billion worldwide and his accolades include an Academy Award and a Primetime Emmy Award as well as nominations for three BAFTA Awards, three Golden Globe Awards and a Grammy Award.

Soderbergh's directorial breakthrough, the indie drama Sex, Lies, and Videotape (1989), won the Palme d'Or at the Cannes Film Festival, as well numerous other accolades and was a worldwide commercial success. His next five films, including the critically lauded King of the Hill (1993), found limited commercial success. He pivoted into more mainstream fare with the crime comedy Out of Sight (1998), the biopic Erin Brockovich (2000), and the crime drama Traffic (2000), for which he won the Academy Award for Best Director.

Soderbergh found further popular and critical success with the Ocean's trilogy and film franchise (2001–2018), Che (2008), The Informant! (2009), Contagion (2011), Haywire (2011), the Magic Mike trilogy (2012–2023), Side Effects (2013), Behind the Candelabra (2013), Logan Lucky (2017), Unsane (2018), Let Them All Talk (2020), No Sudden Move (2021), Kimi (2022), Presence (2024), and Black Bag (2025).

Soderbergh's films often revolve around familiar concepts which are regularly used for big-budget Hollywood movies, but he routinely employs an avant-garde arthouse approach. They center on themes of shifting personal identities, vengeance, sexuality, morality, and the human condition. His film career spans a multitude of genres but his specialties are psychological, crime, and heist films.

== Early life ==
Soderbergh was born on January 14, 1963, in Atlanta, Georgia, to Mary Ann (née Bernard) and Peter Andrew Soderbergh, who was a university administrator and educator. Soderbergh has Swedish, Irish, and Italian roots. His paternal grandfather immigrated to the U.S. from Stockholm.

As a child, he moved with his family to Charlottesville, Virginia, where he lived during his adolescence, and then to Baton Rouge, Louisiana, where his father became Dean of Education at Louisiana State University (LSU). Soderbergh discovered filmmaking as a teenager and directed short films with a Super 8 and 16 mm cameras. He attended the Louisiana State University Laboratory School for high school before graduating and moving to Hollywood to pursue professional filmmaking.

In his first job, he worked as a game show score keeper and cue card holder, then found work as a freelance film editor. During this time, he directed the concert video 9012Live for the rock band Yes in 1985, for which he received a Grammy Award nomination for Best Music Video, Long Form.

== Career ==
=== 1989: directorial debut ===
After Soderbergh returned to Baton Rouge, he wrote the screenplay for Sex, Lies, and Videotape on a legal pad during an eight-day cross-country drive. The film tells the story of a troubled man who videotapes women discussing their lives and sexuality, and his impact on the relationship of a married couple. Soderbergh submitted Sex, Lies, and Videotape to the 1989 Cannes Film Festival where, at age 26, he became the youngest solo director to win the Palme d'Or, the top prize. Its critical performance led it to become a worldwide commercial success, grossing $36.7 million on a $1.2 million budget.

Sex, Lies, and Videotape is considered to be the most influential catalyst of the 1990s Independent Cinema movement. Film critic Roger Ebert called Soderbergh the "poster boy of the Sundance generation". His relative youth and sudden rise to prominence in the film industry had him referred to as a "sensation" and a prodigy. In 2006, Sex, Lies, and Videotape was selected by the Library of Congress for preservation in the United States National Film Registry, being deemed "culturally, historically, or aesthetically significant", and the American Film Institute nominated it as one of the greatest movies ever made.

=== 1990–1997: critical and commercial downturn ===
When I say this is the most important motion picture you'll ever attend, my motivation is not financial gain, but a firm belief that the delicate fabric that holds all of us together will be ripped apart unless every man, woman, and child in this country sees this film and pays full ticket price, not some bargain matinée cut-rate deal.

— Soderbergh's introduction to Schizopolis (1996)

Soderbergh's directorial debut was followed by a series of low-budget box-office disappointments. In 1991, he directed Kafka, a biographical film of Franz Kafka written by Lem Dobbs and starring Jeremy Irons. The film returned one tenth of its budget and received mixed reviews from critics. Roger Ebert's review stated: "Soderbergh does demonstrate again here that he's a gifted director, however unwise in his choice of project". Two years later, he directed the drama King of the Hill (1993), which again underperformed commercially, but fared well with critics. Based on the memoir of writer A. E. Hotchner, the film is set during the Great Depression and follows a young boy (played by Jesse Bradford) struggling to survive on his own in a hotel in St. Louis after his mother falls ill and his father is away on business trips. Also in 1995, he directed a remake of Robert Siodmak's 1949 film noir Criss Cross, titled The Underneath, which grossed $536,020 on a $6.5 million budget and was widely panned by critics. Soderbergh has since called the film "dead on arrival" and described the making of it as his bottoming out.

Soderbergh, formerly a member of Writers Guild of America West, left and maintained financial core status in 1995.

Soderbergh directed Schizopolis in 1996, a comedy which he starred in, wrote, composed and shot as well as directed. The film was submitted to the Cannes Film Festival to such a "chilly response" that he reworked the entire introduction and conclusion before releasing it commercially. In the movie's introduction, he said: "In the event that you find certain sequences or events confusing, please bear in mind this is your fault, not ours. You will need to see the picture again and again until you understand everything". He starred in Schizopolis as Fletcher Munson, a spokesman for a Scientology-esque lifestyle cult, and again as Dr. Jeffrey Korchek, a dentist having an affair with Munson's wife. The film switched languages multiple times mid-scene without subtitles, leaving large parts of it incomprehensible. It was viewed by a critic as a "directorial palate cleanse" for Soderbergh. During the months following his debut of Schizopolis, he released a small, edited version of the Spalding Gray monologue film Gray's Anatomy. Soderbergh would later refer to Schizopolis as his "artistic wake-up call". Soderbergh co-wrote the script for the 1997 horror-thriller Nightwatch with Danish filmmaker Ole Bornedal. Nightwatch is an English-language remake of Bornedal's own film of the same name, which was produced three years earlier in Denmark.

=== 1998–2008: reemergence and Ocean's trilogy ===
Soderbergh's reemergence began in 1998 with Out of Sight, a stylized adaptation of an Elmore Leonard novel, written by Scott Frank and starring George Clooney and Jennifer Lopez. The film was widely praised, though only a moderate box-office success. The critical reception of the movie began a multi-movie artistic partnership between Clooney and Soderbergh. Clooney and Soderbergh next teamed for the latter to start its first production company, Section Eight Productions, a refurbishment of the old Maysville Pictures office, at Warner Bros. Pictures, although Clooney worked for the Maysville office and Soderbergh worked for the New York office. Soderbergh followed up on the success of Out of Sight by making another crime caper, The Limey (1999), from a screenplay by Lem Dobbs and starring actors Terence Stamp and Peter Fonda. The film was well-received and established him within the cinematic niche of thriller and heist films. He ventured into his first biographical film since Kafka in 2000 when he directed Erin Brockovich, written by Susannah Grant and starring Julia Roberts in her Oscar-winning role as a single mother taking on industry in a civil action. In late 2000, Soderbergh released Traffic, a social drama written by Stephen Gaghan and featuring an ensemble cast. Time compared him to a baseball player hitting home runs with Erin Brockovich and Traffic. Both films would be nominated at the 2001 Academy Awards, making him the first director to have been nominated in the same year for Best Director for two different films since Michael Curtiz in 1938. He was awarded the Academy Award for Best Director for Traffic and received best director nominations at the year's Golden Globe and the Directors Guild of America Awards.

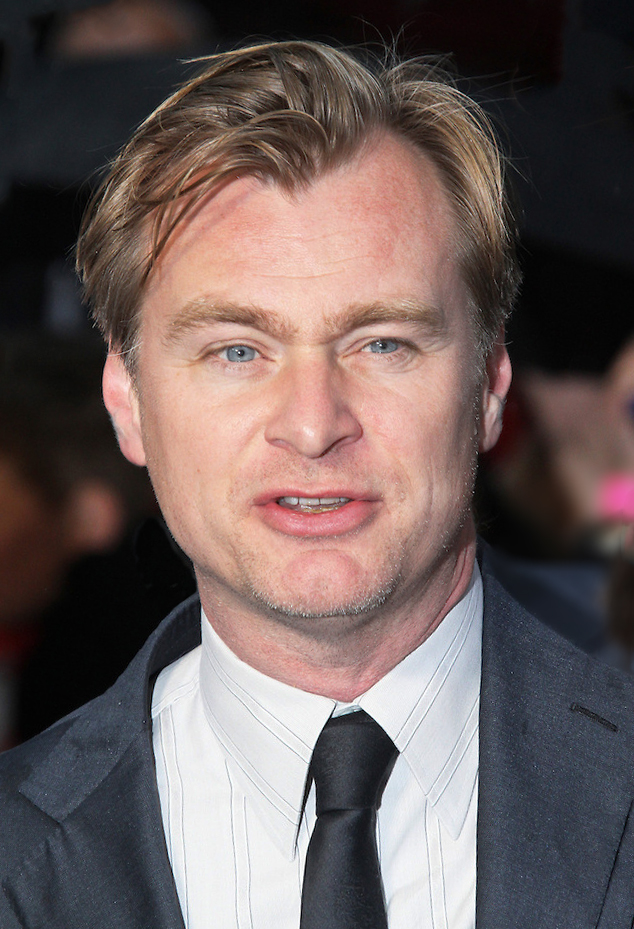
Soderbergh supported director Christopher Nolan (pictured) in his transition from independent to studio filmmaking.

In early 2001, he was approached to direct Ocean's Eleven, a reboot of the 1960s Rat Pack-movie Ocean's 11 written by Ted Griffin. After Griffin wrote the screenplay, Soderbergh signed on to direct. The film opened to critical acclaim and widespread commercial success. It quickly became Soderbergh's highest-grossing movie to date, grossing more than $183 million domestically and more than $450 million worldwide. Rolling Stone credited the movie with "[spawning] a new era of heist movies". In the same year, Soderbergh made Full Frontal, which was shot mostly on digital video in an improvisational style that deliberately blurred the line between which actors were playing characters and which were playing fictionalized versions of themselves. A year later, he was asked by executives at Warner Bros Studios to direct the psychological thriller Insomnia (2002), starring Academy Award winners Al Pacino, Robin Williams, and Hilary Swank. Despite their insistence, Soderbergh declined, preferring to see it directed by up-and-coming director Christopher Nolan.

Before returning to the Ocean's series, Soderbergh directed K Street (2003), a ten-part political HBO series he co-produced with George Clooney. The series was both partially improvised and each episode being produced in the five days prior to airing to take advantage of topical events that could be worked into the fictional narrative. Actual political players appeared as themselves, either in cameos or portraying fictionalized versions of themselves, notably James Carville and Mary Matalin.

The reason my career took such a left turn at a certain point was because I realized I was in danger of becoming a formalist. But that wasn't the best representation of me–even as a person. It's easy to fall into that because it's a very isolated position to occupy and it's easy to keep other elements–people and ideas–at a distance.

— Soderbergh (in 2008) on his transition from Sex, Lies, and Videotape to more stylized, heist and psychological thrillers

Soderbergh directed Ocean's Twelve, a sequel to Ocean's Eleven, in 2004. The second installment received muted critical reviews, and was another commercially successful film, grossing $362.7 million on a $110 million budget. Matt Singer of IndieWire called it a "Great Sequel About How Hard It Is to Make a Great Sequel." Also in 2004, Soderbergh produced and co-wrote the adapted screenplay for the film Criminal—a remake of the Argentine film Nine Queens—with his longtime assistant director Gregory Jacobs, who made his directorial debut with the film. Also that year, the company made its second production company, which soon supplanted Section Eight in 2006, Extension 765, which was launched in 2004.

A year later, Soderbergh directed Bubble (2005), a $1.6 million film featuring a cast of nonprofessional actors. It opened in selected theaters and HDNet simultaneously, and four days later on DVD. Industry heads were reportedly watching how the film performed, as its unusual release schedule could have implications for future feature films. Theater-owners, who at the time had been suffering from dropping attendance rates, did not welcome so-called "day-and-date" movies. National Association of Theatre Owners chief executive John Fithian indirectly called the film's release model "the biggest threat to the viability of the cinema industry today." Soderbergh's response to such criticism: "I don't think it's going to destroy the movie-going experience any more than the ability to get takeout has destroyed the restaurant business." A romantic drama set in post-war Berlin, The Good German, starring Cate Blanchett and Clooney, was released in late 2006. The film performed poorly commercially grossing $5.9 million worldwide against a budget of $32 million.

Soderbergh next directed Ocean's Thirteen, which was released in June 2007 to further commercial success and increased critical acclaim. Grossing $311.3 million on an $85 million budget, it is the second highest-grossing film of his career after the first Ocean's. The film concluded what would later be known as the Ocean's trilogy, a collection of heist movies that would go on to be described as defining a new era of heist films. Soderbergh directed Che, which was released in theaters in two parts, titled The Argentine and Guerrilla, and was presented in the main competition of the 2008 Cannes Film Festival, on May 22. Benicio del Toro played the Argentine guerrilla Ernesto "Che" Guevara in an epic four-hour double bill which looks first at his role in the Cuban Revolution before moving to his campaign and eventual death in Bolivia. Soderbergh shot his feature film The Girlfriend Experience in New York in 2008. Soderbergh cast adult film star Sasha Grey as the film's lead actress to great reception and controversy.

=== 2009–2016: mainstream success and brief hiatus ===
Soderbergh's first film of 2009 was The Informant!, a black comedy starring Matt Damon as corporate whistleblower Mark Whitacre. Whitacre wore a wire for 2 1/2 years for the FBI as a high-level executive at a Fortune 500 company, Archer Daniels Midland (ADM), in one of the largest price-fixing cases in history. The film was released on September 18, 2009. The script for the movie was written by Scott Z. Burns based on Kurt Eichenwald's book, The Informant. The film grossed $41 million on a $22 million budget and received generally favorable reviews from critics. Also in 2009, Soderbergh shot a small improvised film with the cast of the play, The Last Time I Saw Michael Gregg, a comedy about a theatre company staging Chekhov's Three Sisters. He has stated that he does not want it seen by the public, and only intended it for the cast. Soderbergh nearly filmed a feature adaptation of the baseball book Moneyball, starring Brad Pitt and Jonah Hill. The book, by Michael Lewis, tells of how Billy Beane, general manager of Oakland Athletics, used statistical analysis to make up for what he lacked in funds to beat the odds and lead his team to a series of notable wins in 2002. Disagreements between Sony and Soderbergh about revisions to Steven Zaillian's version of the screenplay led to Soderbergh's dismissal from the project only days prior to filming in June 2009. In 2010, Soderbergh shot the action-thriller Haywire, starring Gina Carano, Ewan McGregor, Michael Fassbender and Channing Tatum which, though shot in early 2010, was not released until January 2012.

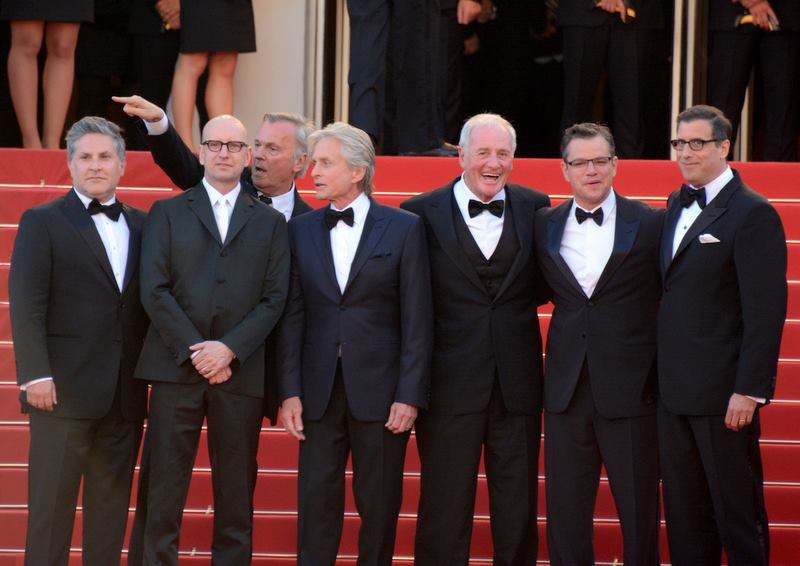
Soderbergh (second from left) with cast and crew of Behind the Candelabra at the 2013 Cannes Film Festival

In 2010, Soderbergh shot the epic virus thriller Contagion, another film written by Burns. With a cast including Damon, Kate Winslet, Gwyneth Paltrow, Laurence Fishburne, Marion Cotillard and Jude Law, the film follows the outbreak of a lethal pandemic across the globe and the efforts of doctors and scientists to discover the cause and develop a cure. Soderbergh premiered it at the 68th Venice Film Festival in Venice, Italy on September 3, 2011, and released it to the general public six days later to commercial success and widespread critical acclaim. It grossed $135.5 million on a $60 million budget, and Manohla Dargis of The New York Times called it a "smart, spooky thriller about a thicket of contemporary plagues—a killer virus, rampaging fear, an unscrupulous blogger—is as ruthlessly effective as the malady at its cool, cool center."

In August 2011, Soderbergh served as a second unit director on The Hunger Games and filmed much of the District 11 riot scene. In September and October 2011, he shot Magic Mike, a film starring Tatum, about the actor's experiences working as a male stripper in his youth. Tatum played the title mentor character, while Alex Pettyfer played a character based on Tatum. The film was released on June 29, 2012, to a strong commercial performance and favorable critical acclaim. Throughout 2012, Soderbergh had announced his intention to retire from feature filmmaking. He stated that "when you reach the point where you're saying, 'If I have to get into a van to do another scout, I'm just going to shoot myself,' it's time to let somebody who's still excited about getting in the van, get in the van." Soderbergh later said that he would retire from filmmaking and begin to explore painting. A few weeks later, Soderbergh played down his earlier comments, saying a filmmaking "sabbatical" was more accurate. For his then-final feature film, he directed the psychological thriller Side Effects, which starred Law, Rooney Mara, Tatum and Catherine Zeta-Jones. It was shot in April 2012 and was released on February 8, 2013. Screened at the 63rd Berlin International Film Festival, A. O. Scott of The New York Times stated that Soderbergh "[handled] it brilliantly, serving notice once again that he is a crackerjack genre technician." In the end, while promoting Side Effects in early 2013, he clarified that he had a five-year plan that saw him transitioning away from making feature films around his fiftieth birthday. Around that time, he gave a much publicized speech at the San Francisco International Film Festival, detailing the obstacles facing filmmakers in the current corporate Hollywood environment.

Soderbergh had planned to commence production in early 2012 on a feature version of The Man from U.N.C.L.E., also written by Burns. George Clooney was set for the lead role of Napoleon Solo but had to drop out due to a recurring back injury suffered while filming Syriana. In November 2011 Soderbergh withdrew from the project due to budget and casting conflicts, and was eventually replaced by Guy Ritchie. His final televised project before heading into retirement was Behind the Candelabra. Shot in the summer of 2012, it starred Michael Douglas as legendarily flamboyant pianist Liberace and Damon as his lover Scott Thorson. The film is written by Richard LaGravenese, based on Thorson's book Behind the Candelabra: My Life with Liberace, and produced by HBO Films. It was selected to compete for the Palme d'Or at the 2013 Cannes Film Festival.

In May 2013—only months into his retirement—Soderbergh announced that he would direct a ten-part miniseries for Cinemax called The Knick. The series followed doctors at a fictionalized version of the Knickerbocker Hospital in Manhattan in the early twentieth century. The series starred Clive Owen, Andre Holland, Jeremy Bobb, Juliet Rylance, Eve Hewson and Michael Angarano and was filmed in 2013. It began airing in August 2014 to critical acclaim. After completing the second season, Soderbergh revealed he was finished directing for the show, and said: "I told them [Cinemax] that I'm going to do the first two years and then we are going to break out the story for seasons 3 and 4 and try and find a filmmaker or filmmakers to do this the way that I did. This is how we want to do this so that every two years, whoever comes on, has the freedom to create their universe."

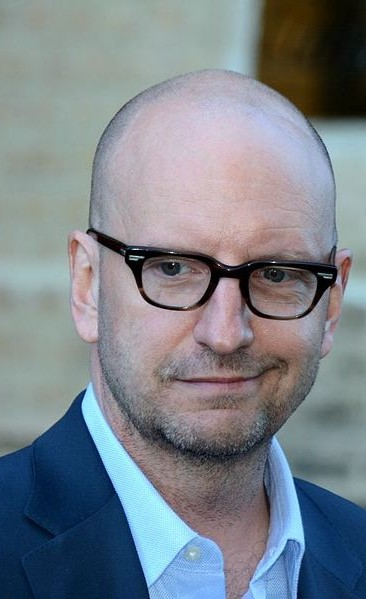
Soderbergh at the Deauville American Film Festival in 2014

After his work with The Knick, Soderbergh began working on a variety of personal projects starting with directing an Off-Broadway play titled The Library, starring Chloë Grace Moretz in January 2014. On February 24, 2014, Soderbergh released a mash-up of Alfred Hitchcock's Psycho (1960) and Gus Van Sant's 1998 shot-by-shot remake on his website, titled Psychos. On April 21, 2014, Soderbergh released an alternate cut of Michael Cimino's controversial 1980 Western Heaven's Gate on his website. Credited to his pseudonym Mary Ann Bernard and dubbed "The Butcher's Cut", Soderbergh's version runs 108 minutes. On September 22, 2014, he uploaded a black-and-white silent version of Raiders of the Lost Ark, with Trent Reznor and Atticus Ross's score of The Social Network. The purpose of it is to study the aspects of staging in filmmaking. It was announced in June 2014 that Soderbergh would be executive producing a series based on his earlier film The Girlfriend Experience for the Starz network, to premiere sometime in 2016. In September 2015, Soderbergh was announced to be directing Mosaic, a series for HBO. Starring Sharon Stone, it was a dual-media project; it was released as both an interactive movie app in November 2017 and as a six-part miniseries airing in January 2018.

=== 2016–present: return to filmmaking ===
In February 2016, Soderbergh officially came out of his retirement to direct a NASCAR heist film, Logan Lucky, starring Channing Tatum, Adam Driver, and Daniel Craig, among others. The film was produced entirely by Soderbergh, with no studio involved in anything other than theatrical distribution. The film was released on August 18, 2017, by Bleecker Street and Fingerprint Releasing, his own distribution and production company. Logan Lucky was met with widespread critical acclaim; Matt Zoller Seitz writing for RogerEbert.com stated: "The odds seem stacked in Logan Lucky's favor the instant you spot 'Directed by Steven Soderbergh' in the opening credits".

In July 2017, it was revealed that Soderbergh had also secretly shot a horror film using iPhones titled Unsane, and starring Claire Foy and Juno Temple. The film was released on March 23, 2018 and was well received by critics, with Scott Meslow of GQ noting its relevance to the modern plight of women in patriarchal societies, and called it a "nerve-jangling modern-day Kafka story". His usage of an iPhone in 4K to film the movie was considered "inspirational to aspiring filmmakers" for breaking down the perceived costs associated with producing a feature film in the United States.

In 2018, Soderbergh directed High Flying Bird, starring Andre Holland who played the role of a sports agent representing his rookie client with an intriguing and controversial business opportunity during an NBA lockout. The film began production in February 2018 and was released on February 8, 2019, by Netflix. Soderbergh's film The Laundromat is a political thriller about the international leak of the Panama Papers, written by Scott Z. Burns and based on the book Secrecy World, by Pulitzer Prize-winner Jake Bernstein. It stars Meryl Streep, Gary Oldman, Antonio Banderas, Jeffrey Wright, Matthias Schoenaerts, James Cromwell and Sharon Stone and premiered at the Venice Film Festival on September 1, 2019 before airing on Netflix. Soderbergh's 2020 film Let Them All Talk, was written by Deborah Eisenberg, and starred Meryl Streep, Candice Bergen, Gemma Chan, Lucas Hedges and Dianne Wiest. It was shot in 2019, primarily aboard the ocean liner Queen Mary 2, and also in New York and the UK, and premiered on December 10, 2020, on HBO Max.

No Sudden Move (formerly Kill Switch) is a 1950s period crime film shot in Detroit from September to November 2020. From Mosaic writer Ed Solomon, it stars Don Cheadle, Benicio del Toro, David Harbour, Amy Seimetz, Jon Hamm, Ray Liotta, Kieran Culkin, Brendan Fraser, Noah Jupe, Bill Duke, Frankie Shaw and Julia Fox. It had its world premiere at the Tribeca Film Festival on June 18, 2021. It was released on HBO Max on July 1, 2021. Kimi, released on HBO Max in 2022, was shot in Seattle and Los Angeles in April and May 2021. It stars Zoë Kravitz as an agoraphobic tech worker who discovers evidence of a violent crime, and reunites Soderbergh with Traffic actors Erika Christensen and Jacob Vargas. Magic Mike's Last Dance, was filmed in London in early 2022. This third episode in the Magic Mike franchise brought back Channing Tatum and also introduced Salma Hayek to the series. The film was originally set to premiere on HBO Max, but was instead released in theaters on February 10, 2023.

Full Circle is a six-part miniseries starring Zazie Beetz, Claire Danes, Jharrel Jerome and Timothy Olyphant. It was written by Ed Solomon, who also wrote Mosaic, and follows "an investigation into a botched kidnapping" that "uncovers long-held secrets connecting multiple characters and cultures in present-day New York City". It premiered on Max on July 13, 2023. Also in July 2023, Soderbergh debuted his science fiction web series Command Z, which is inspired by Kurt Andersen's 2020 book, Evil Geniuses: The Unmaking of America. His film, Presence, a haunted house thriller starring Lucy Liu and Julia Fox, premiered at the 2024 Sundance Film Festival. Soderbergh filmed the 2025 spy thriller Black Bag, written by Kimi and Presence screenwriter David Koepp and starring Cate Blanchett and Michael Fassbender, from May to June 2024 in London. He also produced the Off-Broadway play The Fears, his first stage credit. He shot The Christophers, a dark comedy from Full Circle writer Solomon, in London in early 2025. It stars Ian McKellen, Michaela Coel and James Corden and premiered in September 2025 at the Toronto International Film Festival.

His documentary John Lennon: The Last Interview, about the final interview given by John Lennon and Yoko Ono, premiered on May 15, 2026 at the Cannes Film Festival. In October 2026, Soderbergh was hired to take over directing duties for the upcoming film The Batman: Part II after production was paused so its director, Matt Reeves, could deal with a family matter.

== Filmmaking ==
=== Style ===
Soderbergh's visual style often emphasizes wealthy urban settings, natural lighting, and fast-paced working environments. Soderbergh's experimental style and tendency to reject mainstream film standards stems from his belief that "[filmmakers] are always, in essence, at the beginning of infinity ... there is always another iteration ... always will be."

On a technical level, Soderbergh prefers sustained close-ups, tracking shots, jump cuts, experimental sequencing and frequently skips establishing shots in favor of audio and alternative visuals. Many of his films are noted for a milieu of suspense through the usage of third-person vantage points and a variety of over-the-shoulder shots. In his film Contagion (2011), he used a multi-narrative "hyperlink cinema" style, first established within the Ocean's trilogy. He is known for tracking aesthetic transitions with a variety of colored washes, most notably yellow to symbolize open, socially acceptable situations while blue washes typically symbolize illegal or socially illicit endeavors. In line with these washes, Soderbergh is liberal in his usage of montages as he believes that they are equally important story-telling as dialogue.

Soderbergh is known for having a combative relationship with Hollywood and the standards of studio filmmaking. Film critic Roger Ebert has commented in this stylistic antagonism, "Every once in a while, perhaps as an exercise in humility, Steven Soderbergh makes a truly inexplicable film ... A film so amateurish that only the professionalism of some of the actors makes it watchable ... It's the kind of film where you need the director telling you what he meant to do and what went wrong and how the actors screwed up and how there was no money for retakes, etc."

In Ocean's Twelve (2004), he had actress Julia Roberts play the part of Tess, a character then forced to play a fictionalized version of Roberts. During the production stages of The Girlfriend Experience (2009), he cast adult film star Sasha Grey in the lead role. In Haywire (2011), Soderbergh cast and eventually launched the film career of professional mixed martial arts (MMA) fighter Gina Carano. Soderbergh's Logan Lucky (2017) made reference to his trilogy by alluding to an "Ocean's 7–11", noting the trilogy's influence on the Southern heist film.

Soderbergh's films are centered on suspenseful and ambient soundscapes. A primary way he achieves suspenseful soundscapes is by introducing audio before visuals in cut scenes, alerting the viewer of a sudden change in tone. His frequent collaborations with composers Cliff Martinez, David Holmes, and most recently Thomas Newman, provide his films with "the thematic and sonic landscapes into which he inserts his characters."

=== Method ===
The simplest way that I can describe it is that a movie is something you see, and cinema is something that's made…. Cinema is a specificity of vision. It's an approach in which everything matters. It's the polar opposite of generic or arbitrary and the result is as unique as a signature or a fingerprint. It isn't made by a committee, and it isn't made by a company, and it isn't made by the audience.

— Soderbergh (in 2013) on the influence his methodological choices have on his films

Soderbergh's early films—on account of his youth and lack of resources—were primarily filmed on Super 8 and 16 mm film formats. A variety of his feature films have been shot using a diverse range of camera equipment. He filmed all of The Girlfriend Experience (2009) on a Red One camera, which has retailed for $17,500—a relatively inexpensive camera for a movie produced for $1.3 million. Soderbergh filmed the entirety of Unsane (2018) on an iPhone 7 Plus with its 4K digital camera using the app FiLMiC Pro. He filmed with three rotating iPhones using a DJI stabiliser to hold the phone in place. In January 2018, he expressed an interest in filming other productions solely with iPhones going forward. He then filmed the entirety of 2019's High Flying Bird on an iPhone 8.

In addition to his directing, he is frequently a screenwriter for his films. Scott Tobias of The A. V. Club has noted his method of experimental filmmaking as "rigorously conceived, like a mathematician working out a byzantine equation". Starting in 2000 with his film Traffic, when directing films Soderbergh has used pseudonyms (named after his parents) in order to hide the fact that he edits and shoots most of his films himself.

When working with actors, Soderbergh prefers to pursue a non-intrusive directorial style. "I try and make sure they're OK, and when they're in the zone, I leave them alone. I don't get in their way". This method has attracted repeat performances by many high-profile movie stars which has established a reoccurring collaboration between them and Soderbergh.

=== Themes ===
Soderbergh's films often center the themes of shifting personal identities, sexuality, and the human condition. Richard Brody of The New Yorker stated that Soderbergh is focused on the process of presenting ideas through film rather than their actual realization. In line with this actual realization, he presents themes to critically evaluate political and corporate institutions such as money and capitalism. Film critic A. O. Scott has noted that Soderbergh has a critical interest in exploring the impact capitalist economies have on living an ethical life and the detractions associated with materialism. Money is central to many of his movies as Soderbergh believes that it serves as an obsession unrivaled by any other.

Starting with Out of Sight (1998), Soderbergh's heist films explore themes of vengeance, characters on a mission, and the morality of crime. He is generally said to have a cinematic niche in these types of films. "I've always had an attraction to caper movies, and certainly there are analogies to making a film. You have to put the right crew together, and if you lose, you go to movie jail", the director noted in 2017.

=== Influences ===
When asked about the top eleven films he regarded among the best, Soderbergh listed the following, in order: The 5,000 Fingers of Dr. T. (1953), All The President's Men (1976), Annie Hall (1977), Citizen Kane (1941), The Conversation (1974), The Godfather (1972), The Godfather Part II (1974), Jaws (1975), The Last Picture Show (1971), Sunset Boulevard (1950) and The Third Man (1949). His directorial debut, Sex, Lies, and Videotape (1989), was influenced by Mike Nichols' 1971 American comedy-drama Carnal Knowledge. He has said that Peter Yates' 1972 crime-comedy The Hot Rock inspired the tone of the Ocean's films. Soderbergh listed Costa-Gavras's film, Z as an inspiration on his film Traffic and even stated that he: "wanted to make it like [Costa-Gavras]'s Z". Soderbergh also cites the Swiss-French director Jean-Luc Godard as "... a constant source of inspiration. Before I do anything, I go back and look at as many of his films as I can, as a reminder of what's possible".

== Entrepreneurship ==
In 2018, Soderbergh launched a Bolivian grape spirit brand called "Singani 63". In 2014, he had teamed up with a distillery based in Tarija, Casa Real and became the sole exporter of the spirit from the mountains of Bolivia. Singani is a traditional spirit of Bolivia, and Soderbergh does not like to label singani a brandy, because he says, "Millennials hate brandy." To demonstrate this, he created a very short iPhone/YouTube video, "Brandy VS Singani 63", that asks people to give their thoughts regarding brandy and Singani 63.

== Recurring collaborators ==
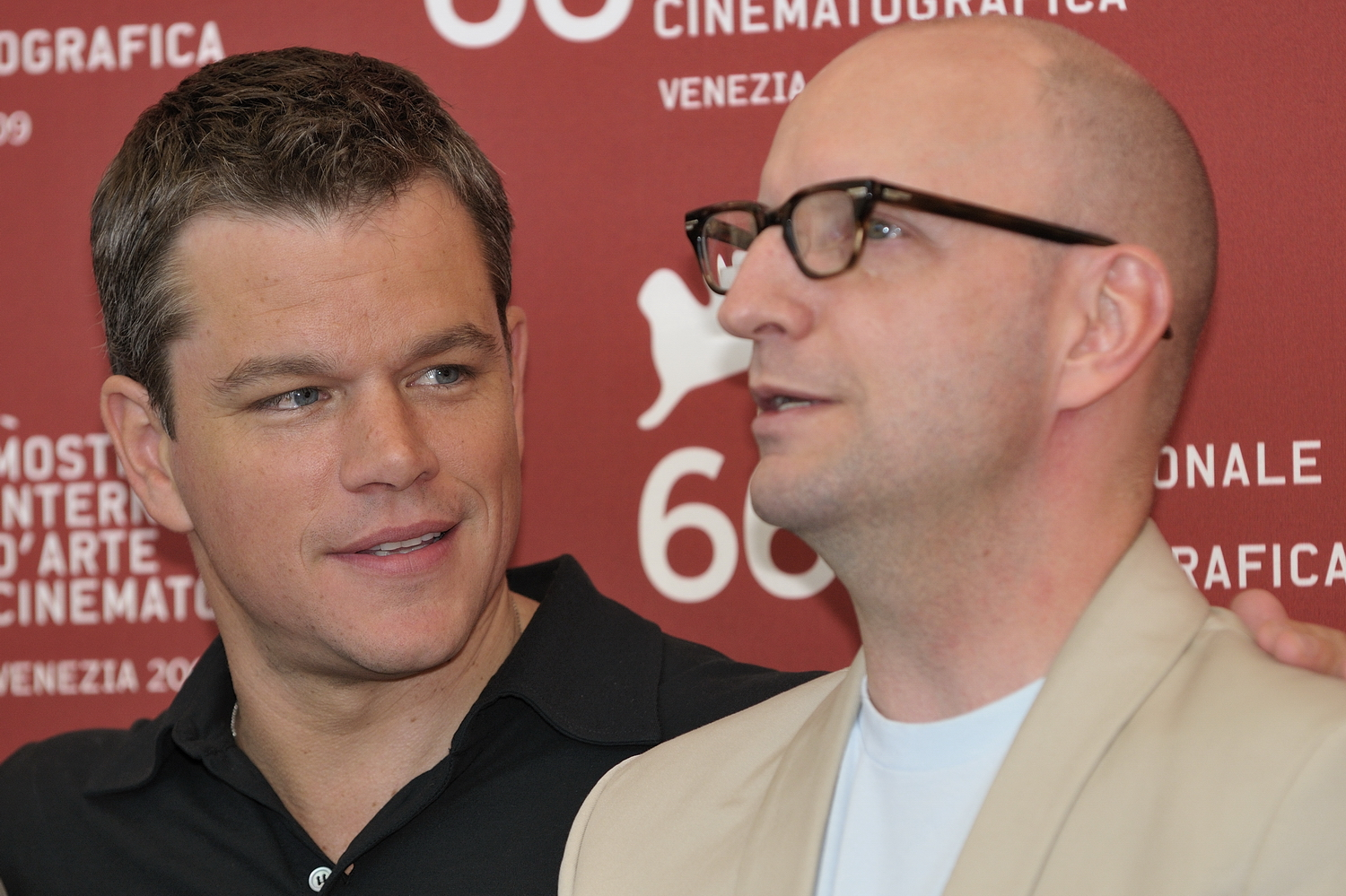
Soderbergh, along with his most frequent collaborator Matt Damon (left), in 2009

Soderbergh has worked with various actors, composers, and screenwriters throughout his filmmaking career. His most prolific collaborators are considered to be George Clooney (who started Section Eight Productions with him and has appeared in six of his films), Matt Damon (his most frequent collaborator, who has appeared in nine of his films), Brad Pitt, Julia Roberts, Don Cheadle, and Channing Tatum. Other actors who have appeared in numerous Soderbergh films include Luis Guzmán, Jude Law, Ann Dowd, Joe Chrest, Benicio Del Toro, Elliott Gould, Catherine Zeta-Jones, Michael Fassbender, Michael Douglas and Albert Finney. Among those who have won awards for their work with Soderbergh, Roberts won an Academy Award for Best Actress for her lead in Erin Brockovich; Benicio del Toro also won an Academy Award for his work in Traffic, and later starred as the title role in Che. Catherine Zeta-Jones received a Golden Globe nomination for her portrayal of Helena in Traffic and reteamed with him for Ocean's Twelve and Side Effects. His proposed Star Wars movie The Hunt for Ben Solo would have been his second collaboration with Adam Driver after Driver starred in Logan Lucky.

Soderbergh has frequently relied on Jerry Weintraub to produce many of his films. Composer Cliff Martinez has scored eleven Soderbergh films starting with Sex, Lies, and Videotape (1989) and ending with Kimi (2022). Northern Irish composer David Holmes joined him in 1998 to score Out of Sight and rejoined him in scoring his Ocean's trilogy. Soderbergh rejected Holmes' score for his 2006 film The Good German, but brought him back for subsequent movies, most recently Logan Lucky (2017). Starting in 2000, composer Thomas Newman has worked with four Soderbergh films, most recently in 2020 with Let Them All Talk. Often editing the films himself, he also works with editor Stephen Mirrione and frequently collaborates with screenwriters Scott Z. Burns, Lem Dobbs, David Koepp and Ed Solomon.

== Views on film industry ==
Soderbergh is a vocal proponent of the preservation of artistic merit in the face of Hollywood corporatism. He believes that "cinema is under assault by the studios and, from what I can tell, with the full support of the audience". He claims that he no longer reads reviews of his movies. "After Traffic I just stopped completely", said the director. "After winning the LA and New York film critics awards, I really felt like, this can only get worse".

Soderbergh dislikes possessory credits, and prefers not to have his name front and center at the start of a film. "The fact that I'm not an identifiable brand is very freeing," Soderbergh stated in 2009, "because people get tired of brands and they switch brands. I've never had a desire to be out in front of anything, which is why I don't take a possessory credit." He often takes cinematography credits on his feature films under the alias Peter Andrews, the given name of his father, and editing credits under Mary Ann Bernard, that of his mother.

In 2009, Soderbergh appeared before the U.S. House Committee on Foreign Affairs, and "cited the French initiative in asking lawmakers to deputize the American film industry to pursue copyright pirates", indicating he supports anti-piracy laws and Internet regulation. In 2009, Soderbergh signed a petition in support of film director Roman Polanski, calling for his release after Polanski was arrested in Switzerland in relation to his 1977 sexual abuse case.

== Personal life ==
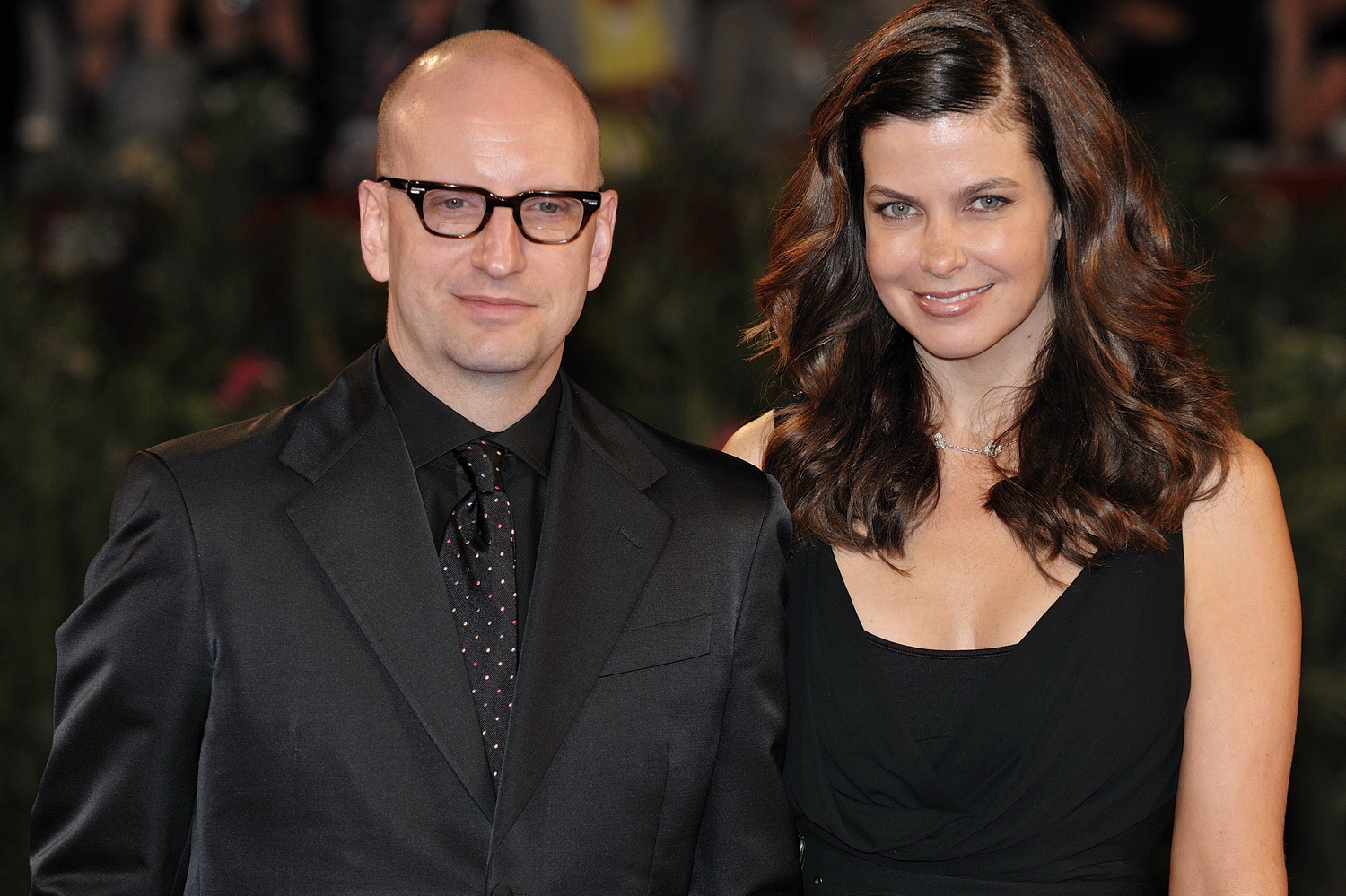
Soderbergh with his wife, Jules Asner, at the 2009 Venice Film Festival

Soderbergh married actress Betsy Brantley in 1989; the couple had a daughter together before their 1994 divorce. He has been married to Jules Asner since 2003, whom he often credits for influencing his female characters. He has a daughter, born in 2010, with a woman in Australia, where he was working during a separation from Asner. Soderbergh lives in New York City. His 2023 web series Command Z was filmed inside his own home.

== Filmography ==
Directed features
Year	Title	Distributor
1989	Sex, Lies, and Videotape	Miramax Films
1991	Kafka	Miramax Films
1993	King of the Hill	Gramercy Pictures
1995	The Underneath	Gramercy Pictures
1996	Schizopolis	Northern Arts
1996	Gray's Anatomy	IFC Films
1998	Out of Sight	Universal Pictures
1999	The Limey	Artisan Entertainment
2000	Erin Brockovich	Universal Pictures / Columbia Pictures
2000	Traffic	USA Films / Initial Entertainment Group
2001	Ocean's Eleven	Warner Bros. Pictures
2002	Full Frontal	Miramax Films
2002	Solaris	20th Century Fox
2004	Ocean's Twelve	Warner Bros. Pictures
2005	Bubble	Magnolia Pictures
2006	The Good German	Warner Bros. Pictures
2007	Ocean's Thirteen	Warner Bros. Pictures
2008	Che	IFC Films / Wild Bunch
2009	The Girlfriend Experience	Magnolia Pictures
2009	The Informant!	Warner Bros. Pictures
2011	Contagion	Warner Bros. Pictures
2011	Haywire	Relativity Media
2012	Magic Mike	Warner Bros. Pictures / FilmNation Entertainment
2013	Side Effects	Open Road Films / FilmNation Entertainment
2013	Behind the Candelabra	HBO Films
2017	Logan Lucky	Fingerprint Releasing / Bleecker Street
2018	Unsane	Fingerprint Releasing / Bleecker Street / 20th Century Fox
2019	High Flying Bird	Netflix
2019	The Laundromat	Netflix
2020	Let Them All Talk	Warner Bros. Pictures / HBO Max
2021	No Sudden Move	Warner Bros. Pictures / HBO Max
2022	Kimi	Warner Bros. Pictures / HBO Max
2023	Magic Mike's Last Dance	Warner Bros. Pictures
2024	Presence	Neon
2025	Black Bag	Focus Features / Universal Pictures
2025	The Christophers	Neon

== Awards and nominations ==
Accolades for Soderbergh's directed features
Year	Feature Film	Academy Awards		BAFTA Awards		Golden Globe Awards	
Year	Feature Film	Nominations	Wins	Nominations	Wins	Nominations	Wins
1989	Sex, Lies, and Videotape	1		2		3	
1998	Out of Sight	2					
2000	Erin Brockovich	5	1	6	1	4	1
2000	Traffic	5	4	4	2	5	2
2006	The Good German	1					
2013	Behind the Candelabra			5		4	2
Total		14	5	17	3	16	5

Soderbergh's entire filmography is routinely analyzed and debated by fans, critics, film academics, and other film directors. His early work—particularly his 1989 film, Sex, Lies, and Videotape—has been noted as foundational to the independent film movement. After directing his first film, Soderbergh's relative youth and sudden rise to prominence in the film industry had him referred to as a "sensation", a prodigy, and a poster boy of the genre's generation. In 2002, he was elected first Vice President of the Directors Guild of America.

After screening Sex, Lies, and Videotape at the 1989 Cannes Film Festival, Soderbergh was given the festival's top award, the Palme d'Or. At 26, he was the youngest solo director to win the award and second-youngest director after French directors Louis Malle and co-director Jacques Cousteau (Malle won it aged 23). For his script, Soderbergh received a nomination for the Academy Award for Best Original Screenplay at the 62nd Academy Awards. Soderbergh was nominated twice for Best Director for two separate films at the 73rd Academy Awards, the first occurrence of such an event since 1938. Apart from his first nomination (Erin Brockovich), he won the award for Traffic. When the same thing happened at the Directors Guild of America Awards, the Associated Press called the category a "Soderbergh vs. Soderbergh" contest. For his work of Erin Brockovich and Traffic, Soderbergh became one of the five directors (alongside Quentin Tarantino, Curtis Hanson, David Fincher, and Barry Jenkins) to ever sweep "The Big Four" critics awards (LAFCA, NBR, NYFCC, NSFC).

Directed Academy Award performances
Under Soderbergh's direction, these actors have received Academy Award wins and nominations for their performances in their respective roles.

Year	Performer	Film	Result
Academy Award for Best Actress
2000	Julia Roberts	Erin Brockovich	Won
Academy Award for Best Supporting Actor
2000	Albert Finney	Erin Brockovich	Nominated
2000	Benicio del Toro	Traffic	Won

== See also ==
- Steven Soderbergh's unrealized projects

== Bibliography ==
- Waxman, Sharon (2005). Rebels on the Backlot: Six Maverick Directors and How They Conquered the Hollywood Studio System. New York: HarperEntertainment. ISBN 9780060540173.
- deWaard, Andrew, and R. Colin Tait (2013). The Cinema of Steven Soderbergh: Indie Sex, Corporate Lies, and Digital Videotape. New York: Wallflower/Columbia University Press.
- Baker, Aaron (2011). Steven Soderbergh. Urbana: University of Illinois Press.
- Gallagher, Mark (2013). Another Steven Soderbergh Experience: Authorship and Contemporary Hollywood. Austin: University of Texas Press.
- Wood, Jason (2002). Steven Soderbergh. Harpenden, UK: Pocket Essentials.
- Palmer, R. Barton, and Steven Sanders (2011). The Philosophy of Steven Soderbergh. Lexington: University Press of Kentucky.
