= Let Them All Talk =

2020 film directed by Steven Soderbergh

- Official release poster
- Directed by: Steven Soderbergh
- Written by: Deborah Eisenberg
- Produced by: Gregory Jacobs
- Starring: Meryl Streep; Candice Bergen; Gemma Chan; Lucas Hedges; Dianne Wiest
- Cinematography: Steven Soderbergh (as Peter Andrews)
- Edited by: Steven Soderbergh (as Mary Ann Bernard)
- Music by: Thomas Newman
- Production company: Extension 765
- Distributed by: Warner Bros. Pictures
- Release date: December 10, 2020 (United States)
- Running time: 113 minutes
- Country: United States
- Language: English

Let Them All Talk is a 2020 American comedy-drama film directed by Steven Soderbergh from a screenplay by Deborah Eisenberg. The film stars Meryl Streep, Dianne Wiest, Candice Bergen, Lucas Hedges, and Gemma Chan. Much of the dialogue was improvised by the cast, and Soderbergh shot the film using natural light and little equipment aboard the Queen Mary 2.

Let Them All Talk was released on HBO Max on December 10, 2020 and received generally positive reviews from critics.

== Plot ==
Alice Hughes is a Pulitzer Prize-winning author working on her latest manuscript, which her publisher hopes will be a sequel to her best-known work, You Always/You Never. Alice is due to receive a literary award in the United Kingdom but is unable to fly due to her health, leading her agent Karen to suggest she make the transatlantic crossing on the Queen Mary 2. Alice invites her nephew Tyler to assist her while on the voyage, and her university friends Roberta and Susan, with whom she has lost touch. Alice and Roberta have a difficult relationship stemming from Roberta's belief that Alice used details about her in You Always/You Never, which Roberta feels derailed her life. Unbeknownst to Alice, Karen joins them on the ship, hoping to learn details about Alice's new book.

Once on the ship, Karen strikes up a friendship with Tyler, using him to gain information from Alice. Alice tells Tyler that the book is about "trying to catch lightning in a bottle for a second time", possibly implying that it will be a sequel to previous work. She spends the majority of her time writing, only taking breaks to eat and swim. Roberta attempts to attract wealthy men on board, while Susan begins interacting with Kelvin Kranz, another writer; Kranz writes popular mystery and thriller books, which Alice dismisses. Kranz also knows Karen and advises her not to pry into the details of Alice's work. Roberta attempts to meet with Alice to seek an apology and acknowledgment of Alice's use of her life details – a fact that Alice has never admitted to – but the two fail to connect. Alice runs into Tyler and Karen together and learns that Tyler has a romantic interest in Karen. Tyler and Karen have dinner, where Tyler's romantic advances are rejected. Alice invites Karen to dinner with the foursome, where tensions come to a head between Alice and Roberta after Karen asks about the new book. They are interrupted by Susan, who accuses them both of being selfish and holding onto their bitterness. Alice decides to delete her book, implied to be a sequel to You Always/You Never as both Karen and Roberta expected.

After disembarking the ship, Alice and Roberta have a conversation about their estrangement. Roberta tells Alice that she will provide her with the life details Alice would need to write a sequel to You Always/You Never, but wants a share of the profits in return. Alice rejects this offer and they part with Roberta telling Alice "I loved you when you were Al." That evening, Alice begins work on a new writing project.

The next morning, a man that Tyler saw frequently coming out of Alice's room on the ship greets him at Alice's door. He reveals that he is Dr. Mitchell, Alice's personal physician and that Alice has died in the night from deep vein thrombosis; Dr. Mitchell was aboard the ship to administer injections of a blood thinning medication to Alice.

Tyler, Roberta, and Susan visit the grave of 19th-century author Blodwyn Pugh, as Alice had intended them to. Back in the United States, Roberta gives Alice's writing, which she took from Alice's room after her death, to Karen in the hopes of profiting from it. Karen maintains that the work is unfinished and cannot be published, but encourages Roberta's idea of writing a book about her life experiences. Susan works with Krantz on a new book based on an idea of hers she shared with him aboard the ship. Tyler receives Alice's unfinished writing from Karen and returns it to her apartment, recalling a talk Alice made celebrating the existence of consciousness and the ability of people to affect each other.

== Cast ==
- Meryl Streep as Alice Hughes, Tyler's aunt and Roberta and Susan's friend
- Candice Bergen as Roberta, Alice and Susan's friend
- Dianne Wiest as Susan, Eddie's mother and Alice and Roberta's friend
- Gemma Chan as Karen, Alice's literary agent
- Lucas Hedges as Tyler Hughes, Alice's nephew
- John Douglas Thompson as Dr. Mitchell
- Christopher Fitzgerald as Eddie, Susan's son
- Daniel Algrant as Kelvin Kranz
- Fred Hechinger as Fred
- Samia Finnerty as Samia

== Production ==
In August 2019, it was announced Meryl Streep and Gemma Chan would star in the film, with Steven Soderbergh directing from a screenplay by Deborah Eisenberg. Later that month, it was announced HBO Max had acquired the distribution rights to the film, along with the additions of Candice Bergen, Dianne Wiest and Lucas Hedges to the cast.

Production began in August 2019 in New York City and continued on board the Cunard ocean liner RMS Queen Mary 2 as it crossed the Atlantic, lasting two weeks. Soderbergh only used the story outline written by Eisenberg, and allowed the actors to improvise much of their dialogue. Soderbergh served as the film editor and cinematographer. According to Wiest, Soderbergh "held the camera in a wheelchair and just rolled along," and sound was the only equipment used. Streep said she was paid 25 cents for her role.

== Release ==
The film was released digitally on December 10, 2020, by HBO Max.

== Reception ==
According to the review aggregator website Rotten Tomatoes, 88% of 114 critic reviews are positive, with the average rating of 7.2/10. The website's critical consensus reads, "When Steven Soderbergh rounds up a cast this talented, it's definitely wise to Let Them All Talk—and this light yet rewarding dramedy more than lives up to expectations." On Metacritic, the film was assigned a weighted average score of 72 out of 100, based on 31 reviews, indicating "generally favorable" reviews.

Leah Greenblatt of Entertainment Weekly gave the film an A− and described it as "a chance to spend two hours watching Streep & Co. make the most of Deborah Eisenberg's deliciously salty script, while Soderbergh—who also serves as cinematographer—shoots it all in ruthless, radiant light."
