= King of the Hill (1993 film) =

1993 film by Steven Soderbergh

- Theatrical release poster
- Directed by: Steven Soderbergh
- Screenplay by: Steven Soderbergh
- Based on: King of the Hill by A. E. Hotchner
- Produced by: Albert Berger; Barbara Maltby; Ron Yerxa
- Starring: Jeroen Krabbé; Lisa Eichhorn; Karen Allen; Spalding Gray; Elizabeth McGovern; Jesse Bradford
- Cinematography: Elliot Davis
- Edited by: Steven Soderbergh
- Music by: Cliff Martinez
- Production companies: Wildwood Enterprises; Bona Fide Productions
- Distributed by: Gramercy Pictures
- Release date: August 20, 1993
- Running time: 103 minutes
- Country: United States
- Language: English
- Budget: $8 million
- Box office: $1.2 million

King of the Hill is a 1993 American coming-of-age drama film written and directed by Steven Soderbergh. Adapted from A. E. Hotchner's Depression-era memoir, the film follows a young boy navigating life alone in a hotel after his mother is hospitalized and his father is oftentimes absent. It stars Jesse Bradford as Aaron, alongside Jeroen Krabbé and Lisa Eichhorn as his parents. The cast also includes Spalding Gray, Adrien Brody, Karen Allen, and Lauryn Hill in supporting roles.

The film received universal critical acclaim for its storytelling and rich character development. It marked the second time Soderbergh directed from his own screenplay, following his 1989 Academy Award–nominated film Sex, Lies, and Videotape. King of the Hill was nominated for the Palme d'Or at the Cannes Film Festival, and was named one of the top ten films of 1993 by Time and Entertainment Weekly. In 2024, British GQ ranked it as the best film of Soderbergh's career. It was released on Blu-ray by The Criterion Collection.

== Plot ==
Based on the Depression-era bildungsroman memoir of writer A. E. Hotchner, the film follows the story of a boy struggling to survive on his own in a hotel in St. Louis after his mother enters a sanatorium with tuberculosis and his younger brother is sent to live with an uncle. His father, a German immigrant and traveling salesman working for the Hamilton Watch Company, is off on long trips from which the boy cannot be certain he will return.

== Cast ==
- Jeroen Krabbé as Mr. Kurlander
- Lisa Eichhorn as Mrs. Kurlander
- Karen Allen as Miss Mathey
- Spalding Gray as Mr. Mungo
- Elizabeth McGovern as Lydia
- Jesse Bradford as Aaron
- Cameron Boyd as Sullivan
- Adrien Brody as Lester
- Joe Chrest as Ben
- John McConnell as Patrolman Burns
- Amber Benson as Ella McShane
- Kristin Griffith as Mrs. McShane
- Katherine Heigl as Christina Sebastian
- Lauryn Hill as Elevator Operator

== Reception ==
=== Box office ===
King of the Hill grossed $1.2 million domestically (United States and Canada), against a production budget of $8 million.

=== Critical response ===
On the review aggregator website Rotten Tomatoes, 91% of 33 critics' reviews are positive, with an average rating of 7.8/10. The website's consensus reads: "A subtle, affecting, character-driven coming-of-age story, King of the Hill is one of Steven Soderbergh's best and most criminally overlooked films." Metacritic, which uses a weighted average, assigned the film a score of 86 out of 100, based on 12 critics, indicating "universal acclaim".

In her review in The New York Times, Janet Maslin says, "The film does a lovely job of juxtaposing the sharp contrasts in Aaron's life, and in marveling at the fact that he survives as buoyantly as he does."
