= Full Frontal (film) =

2002 film by Steven Soderbergh

- Theatrical release poster
- Directed by: Steven Soderbergh
- Written by: Coleman Hough
- Produced by: Gregory Jacobs; Scott Kramer
- Starring: David Duchovny; Nicky Katt; Catherine Keener; Mary McCormack; David Hyde Pierce; Julia Roberts; Blair Underwood
- Cinematography: Peter Andrews
- Edited by: Sarah Flack
- Music by: Jacques Davidovici
- Distributed by: Miramax Films
- Release date: August 2, 2002
- Running time: 101 minutes
- Country: United States
- Language: English
- Budget: $2 million
- Box office: $3.4 million

Full Frontal is a 2002 American comedy-drama film by Steven Soderbergh about a day in the life of a handful of characters in Hollywood. It stars Catherine Keener, Blair Underwood, David Duchovny, Julia Roberts, Mary McCormack, Nicky Katt, Brad Pitt, and David Hyde Pierce. The film was shot on digital video using the Canon XL-1s in under a month. The film blurs the line between what is real and what is fiction in its depiction of a film within a film (and possibly within another).

== Plot ==
An up and coming actor, Nicholas, is interviewed by Catherine, first in an airport and then during a flight from New York to LA. She comments on how much easier the careers of his white colleagues seem to have progressed compared to his own, while he guesses, correctly, that she has a straight, male intern working for her. He pushes her to give him details of her notoriously cruel father, but she only admits that he adored her.

Carl and Lee Bright, a married couple who are drifting apart, start their day amicably, but coldly before departing for work. Carl writes for a magazine and has a boss he dislikes, while Lee is the VP of HR in a large company in LA.

A masseuse, Linda, muses about her dating life while on her way to work. She's recently met someone online who claims to be from Tucson and whom she hopes to develop a relationship with, though she has already withheld information from him, such as her age and the specifics of her work. He has claimed he's a young painter. She passes Carl on his commute to work and the two acknowledge each other positively.

A middle-aged playwright, Arty, and an actor discuss and then rehearse a play they're working on about Hitler, imagining him as an affable, relatable everyman.

At work, Carl discusses with a female colleague the reasons why someone might star in porn. She recommends he stop overthinking it and tries to shut down further conversations on similar topics, explaining that they're now especially inappropriate as she's recently started dating someone. Carl switches to voicing his concerns about a meeting his boss has scheduled with him later that day.

Meanwhile, Lee interviews an employee, David, who, after three years working at her company, she has to admit hasn't made an impression on anyone higher up and as such is at risk of being fired. She grills him with a series of unusual questions, which make him uncomfortable, finally asking him to name as many African countries as possible in a minute, which he seems hesitant to do.

Carl discusses plans to get a hair transplant with a friend in the bathroom at work. The friend dissuades him from doing so and, when the conversation leads there, suggests replacing the word "but" with "and" when Carl discusses his wife, to build a more positive view of their relationship. Linda visits a friend who works as a waitress and discusses her plans to meet with her online acquaintance in a Holiday Inn, which he'll pay for.

The rehearsal of the play about Hitler breaks down when Arty is too distracted talking to someone he's met online to focus on the work his lead actor is doing, causing the lead to storm out of the theatre. Back on the plane, Nicholas returns to his seat to find a heartfelt note, which he believes Catherine placed there as a prank, but she denies writing or even knowing about it. Nicholas tears the letter up to show how unfazed he is by this.

Carl discusses "porn names" with Tracy, his office's receptionist. Despite her showing clear discomfort, he explains that they're a combination of your middle name and the name of the street you grew up on. When he asks her for her porn name, she says that she doesn't have a middle name. Another interviewee of Lee's successfully names several African countries while Lee makes her play catch with an inflatable globe. This interviewee questions whether Lee is allowed to treat employees this way, but Lee assures her she is.

After the interview, Lee has a phone call with Linda, who asks her if they're still having lunch to celebrate Lee's birthday. Lee pretends she has a bad connection in order to end the call early. Linda later talks to a client about how she and her sister, Lee, were seriously affected when they found their father dead in the basement of their family home as children.

Carl practices a speech explaining his friend Gus's views on how attractive gangster stories are to people who want to experience danger vicariously through them before being interrupted by his boss, with whom he starts discussing plans for a cover story. Carl's boss assures him that he trusts Carl's judgement on such matters, but wanted instead to talk to him about whether he drinks beer from a bottle or pours it into a glass. Carl says he drinks from a glass, to which his boss explains "I want this magazine to drink from the bottle". Carl struggles to understand what this implies.

Following their flight, Nicholas muses to Catherine on the things that have changed about how African American leading men are treated in Hollywood, but also the main way in which they haven't: that America still seems wary of seeing them express love.

Linda and Lee discuss Linda's romantic life over lunch. Lee shows disdain for Linda's plans, but also offers to help fund them. Having returned to the theatre, the actor disregards Arty's concerns about the fact that another actor, due to play Eva Braun, has just quit the play. The actor suggests that she only judged him for drinking blood because she hasn't done it herself.

Back at the lunch, Linda suggests Lee is too concerned about turning 41 and Lee retorts that, as a child, their mother claiming to people that Lee "ruined her body" was only one of many things which scarred her psychologically and lead to this mindset. Lee also notes that Linda's birthday gift is smaller than the one she gave the previous year, reminding her that it wasn't an appropriate gift to give to your married sister and that she only used it once. This year, playing it safer, Linda has gotten Lee what she claims is a coin purse.

On a film set, Catherine describes to Nicholas a dream she had about Carl, who she considers is unappreciated at work, before he's pulled away to film a scene alongside Brad Pitt. Carl is fired from his job and immediately starts worrying about how this might ruin his whole life before remembering how much he likes teaching and could pivot to that.

During a break from filming, Catherine asks Nicholas if he'd take a role that the black community would disapprove of and he admits he would if he needed the money. After delivering this line, the two pause and Nicholas asks if they're still rolling. The two then reveal themselves to be actors, Calvin and Francesca, working on a film about a film star. Their director reminds them of an upcoming scene involving "the second letter, at the airport" and the two actors separate to run errands while Brad Pitt is reassured that his movie is actually the real movie.

While Calvin secretly has sex with Lee in a hotel, Carl thinks about how he and his friend Arty conceptualised the film about a film. Carl admits Arty did all the real writing and confesses misgivings about Calvin's acting skill, which he has ignored at the insistence of his wife. It's revealed that Francesca's intern is gay and the two discuss her unsuccessful dating life.

Following her clandestine meeting, Lee bumps into Linda in the hotel lobby and fails to come up with a convincing lie to explain her presence, eventually just claiming to be late and rushing off. Back in the film, Nicholas and Catherine attend a meeting with a producer called Harvey who is shown to be brash and tasteless. They leave the meeting without securing any roles for Nicholas, much to his frustration.

Linda visits a man in a hotel room for a massage he's ordered, during which he pressures her into performing a sex act at the end of the massage in exchange for an extra $500. She reluctantly accepts and, 40 seconds later, when the act is complete, she discovers that he is Lee's friend Gus. Linda notices $500 in Gus' jeans and takes it without his knowledge. He then tries to pay her and is surprised to find he doesn't have enough money on him to do so. She admonishes him for what he's done and leaves, retaining the pretence that she hasn't been paid.

Back at work, Lee asks a third interviewee if they find her attractive. The female interviewee says she does, but not in a specific way. Down in the hotel lobby, Linda passes a tray of gift bags created as part of Gus's imminent 40th birthday celebration. A member of hotel staff calls her to one side and gives her "her gift bag". Inside, she finds a thank you letter from Gus along with $500.

While driving home from work, Lee is held up by blocked roads caused by the film Calvin and Francesca are shooting. Carl gets home before Lee and finds their dog has eaten almost a whole tray of hash brownies he left out and Carl worries the dog may die because of this. While he struggles to get a vet to complete a home visit, Lee goes shopping across the street from an upmarket clothing store. Inside the clothing store, Linda buys an extravagant dress with cash. Further down the street, Arty prepares for the first public performance of his new play. Eventually, Carl is able to get a vet, Heather, to visit, who confirms his dog will be fine and suggests the two of them share the remaining hash brownies.

Calvin and Francesca complete another scene of their film in which Nicholas is rejected again and collapses in shock. Calvin and Francesca then head to the hotel Calvin met up with Lee in earlier. In the lobby, they spot Lee in the distance and Calvin claims not to know her before being interrupted by Lucy, the colleague who mentioned a new relationship to Carl prior to his firing. Linda then enters the hotel lobby and makes her way over to Lee. The two make their way together up to Gus' birthday celebration, which Calvin, Francesca and Lucy are also attending. Francesca is approached by a lighting technician called Sam who compliments her profusely, much to her satisfaction.

After Catherine has helped Nicholas into a chair, he asks Catherine to return to New York with him, explaining that no-one's ever written a love letter to him like the one he found on the plane. Catherine maintains that she didn't write that, but he kisses her anyway. In Arty's play, Hitler comments on how the most memorable thing about him will be his moustache and that people will say he stole that from Charlie Chaplin.

Back at the party, Francesca tries to remember what makes up your porn name to the amusement of those around her, including Calvin, Lucy and Harvey. Lee glumly watches them laugh together from afar. As Gus hasn't yet arrived at his own birthday party, Calvin addresses the room and suggests they share stories about Gus in his absence. He recounts a time that Gus called him at 1:20am to ask Calvin's honest opinion of him, to which Calvin stated his opinion would be the same at 10am and then hung up. Other party guests start sharing stories of Gus while Lee enlists Linda's help in re-inflating the globe Lee had used earlier at work.

Following the completion of their play, Arty and the actor are both satisfied with the production, though the actor is disappointed that Arty's friend Carl didn't attend. Arty excuses Carl's absence due to having to attend a party and, in turn, the actor wishes Arty luck with the date he's going to go on with the young woman he's met online.

At the party, an inebriated Lee throws her inflated globe at Calvin, causing a commotion but not revealing the extent of their relationship. Linda forbids her from drinking anymore and then leaves to search for Gus. Linda finds him, dead from auto-erotic asphyxiation, in his hotel room and phones Lee, interrupting a drunken speech she is giving from atop a chair to the room full of party-goers. Lee joins Linda in Gus' hotel room and the sight of his corpse reminds Lee of the trauma the sisters experienced as children. Linda struggles to comfort Lee through this.

Meanwhile, Carl describes his marital troubles to Heather, including a time when Lee agreed to film the two of them having sex. Once the filming equipment was set up, Lee started filming herself using an exceptionally large sex toy instead and, fearful of not being able to live up to that experience, Carl hasn't been able to be intimate with her since. He continues to describe he and Lee's more platonic relationship as well as his thoughts on her unresolved trauma while, unbeknownst to him, Lee returns home and quietly sits out of sight, listening to Carl's thoughts. Only when he's finished speaking do Carl and Heather realise Lee is present. Lee relays the fact of Gus' death and then breaks down, prompting Heather to leave and Carl to comfort her. Lee begs Carl to never leave her and he agrees not to.

The following day, some characters think back on the events of the previous one. Lee accepts that life can't be good all the time; Carl decides he can't give up hoping for life to get better; Francesca decides she's willing to try dating Sam; Calvin thinks about how different Lucy is to him and how right things feel when he's with her. Catherine ends up meeting Nicholas at the airport at the last minute and the two fly back to New York together. Linda and Arty meet each other in an airport as they both wait to catch a flight to Tucson, unaware that they have been lying to each other over the internet. The two get on well and decide to start dating instead of meeting the people they intended to meet in Tucson. As they comment how their story is like something out a movie, the camera pulls back to reveal the two of them sat on a stage being filmed.

== Cast ==
- David Duchovny as Gus
- Enrico Colantoni as Arty
- Nicky Katt as Hitler
- Catherine Keener as Lee
- Mary McCormack as Linda
- David Hyde Pierce as Carl
- Julia Roberts as Francesca / Catherine
- Blair Underwood as Calvin / Nicholas
- Jeff Garlin as Harvey, probably
- David Alan Basche as Nicholas's Agent
- Terence Stamp as Man On Plane / Himself
- David Fincher as Film Director
- Jerry Weintraub as Jerry
- Brad Pitt as Himself
- Rainn Wilson, Eddie McClintock, Dina Waters and Sandra Oh as Fired Employees
- January Jones as Tracy
- Patrick Fischler as Harvey’s Assistant

== Production ==
The film was announced in 2001 and Catherine Keener was the first actor attached to the project, named How to Survive a Hotel Room Fire. It was billed by Miramax as "an unofficial sequel of sorts" to Sex, Lies, and Videotape. In October, Julia Roberts, David Hyde Pierce, and David Duchovny were announced as leads in the project, and after the September 11 attacks, the film title was changed to The Art of Negotiating a Turn.

After a phone call with Harvey Weinstein due to him disliking the new title, Soderbergh suggested the title Full Frontal. Production on the film began on November 6, 2001.

The character named Harvey (played by Jeff Garlin) is a reference to Weinstein himself.

== Release ==
=== Box office ===
Full Frontal had a limited release in the United States on August 2, 2002, opening in 208 theaters, and earning $739,834 its first weekend. The film was released in the United Kingdom on May 23, 2003, and failed to reach the Top 10.

=== Critical response ===
Review aggregation website Rotten Tomatoes gives the film a score of 39% based on reviews from 145 critics. The site's consensus reads: "An [sic] confusing movie made worse by the poor camera work." Metacritic, which uses a weighted average, assigned the film a score of 45 out of 100, based on 37 critics, indicating "mixed or average" reviews.

Writing for the Chicago Sun-Times, Roger Ebert called Full Frontal "a film so amateurish that only the professionalism of some of the actors makes it watchable". Kenneth Turan of the Los Angeles Times wrote, "When a set of pre-shooting guidelines a director came up with for his actors turns out to be cleverer, better written and of considerable more interest than the finished film, that's a bad sign. A very bad sign."

Other critics praised Soderbergh for his experimental approach. Ann Hornaday of The Washington Post gave an overall positive review, but wrote, "Full Frontal is a movie about people making movies about movies, and Soderbergh edits so quickly and effortlessly between those layers of reality that a concentrically ordered universe similar to nesting Russian dolls quickly begins to feel more like a hall of mirrors. Watching Full Frontal is a vertiginous, disorienting experience, one that reflects its characters with grotesque, funny and sometimes horrifying exaggeration. No matter how much fun it is to watch – and for hard-core movie fans, it is often enormous fun – there's a certain relief when it stops and we're popped back out to our banal, one-track lives."

USA Today gave the film three out of four stars, recommending it for its "humor and talented cast".

==== Retrospective reviews ====
In 2016, Lawrence Garcia wrote in an essay for Mubi that the film’s amateurish filming techniques were precisely Soderbergh’s point, saying Full Frontal "is a film about aesthetics, or more specifically the phoniness of it; that is, it’s concerned mainly with the gulf between an object, its presentation, and interpretation, with the L.A. lifestyle (which includes a neighbor that perpetually wears a Dracula costume) providing the perfect backdrop." Garcia did say the film’s "major flaw is that while individual scenes are often amusing, the film as a whole never quite coheres."

For the 20th anniversary of the film, writer Craig J. Clark noted "the parallels between [the behavior of the character Gus]…and the accusations leveled at executive producer Harvey Weinstein, one of the handful of sexual predators ensnared by the #MeToo movement whose punishment appears to be sticking. What makes the film especially curious as a cultural artifact is Gus is not its only Weinstein stand-in", referring to Garlin’s character, as well.
