= Lem Dobbs =

British-American screenwriter

- Born: Anton Lemuel Kitaj; 24 December 1958 (age 67); Oxford, England
- Education: American School London, England
- Occupation: Screenwriter
- Spouse: Dana Kraft
- Parent(s): R. B. Kitaj (father), Elsi Roessler (mother)

Lem Dobbs (born Anton Lemuel Kitaj; 24 December 1958) is a British-American screenwriter, best known for the films Dark City (1998) and The Limey (1999). He was born in Oxford, England, and is the son of the painter R. B. Kitaj. The pen name "Dobbs" was taken from the character played by Humphrey Bogart in The Treasure of the Sierra Madre (1948).

== Career ==
Dobbs's earliest work in the film industry was as a child actor in The Boy Who Turned Yellow (1972), a short film that was the last collaboration between director Michael Powell and the screenwriter/producer Emeric Pressburger.

In 1979, Dobbs wrote Edward Ford, an original screenplay that remains unproduced. Critic Matthew Dessem has called the script "famously brilliant, famously unproduced", and asserts that "most of Hollywood" agrees it is a "masterpiece". On the basis of another unproduced screenplay, The Marvel of the Haunted Castle, Dobbs was hired to rewrite Diane Thomas's screenplay for Romancing the Stone (1984), though his contributions went uncredited. He described his on-location experience as a matter of "helping to solve logistical problems on a daily basis, making constant adjustments" and later claimed it was his only attempt at "classic script doctoring."

Following that film's success, several films based on Dobbs's screenplays were produced: Hider in the House (1989), The Hard Way (1991), Kafka (1991), which Dobbs wrote in the 1970s, and The Limey (1999). He was also credited as co-writer on Dark City (1998), The Score (2001) and Haywire (2011), an action-thriller directed by Steven Soderbergh (who also directed Kafka and The Limey).

Dobbs has spoken on DVD and blu-ray commentary tracks for his films Dark City and The Limey, and (as a film historian) for the unrelated In the French Style (1963), Von Ryan's Express (1965), The Sand Pebbles (1966), The Chase (1966), 10 Rillington Place (1971) and Double Indemnity (1945), the last due to his personal friendship with the director Billy Wilder.

== Filmography ==
=== Feature films ===
Year	Film	Credit	Notes
1972	The Boy Who Turned Yellow	Munro	As Lem Kitaj
1984	Romancing the Stone	Uncredited contributions	
1989	Hider in the House	Written by, co-producer	
1991	The Hard Way	Screenplay by, story by	Co-wrote screenplay with Daniel Pyne, co-wrote story with Michael Kozoll
1991	Kafka	Written by	
1998	Dark City	Screenplay by	Co-wrote screenplay with Alex Proyas and David S. Goyer, based on a story by Alex Proyas
1999	The Limey	Written by	
2001	The Score	Screenplay by	Co-wrote screenplay with Kario Salem and Scott Marshall Smith, based on a story by Daniel E. Taylor and Kario Salem
2003	S.W.A.T	Uncredited revisions	
2011	Haywire	Written by	
2012	The Company You Keep	Screenplay by	
2013	Skating to New York	Thanks	
2018	Gotti	Written by, co-producer	Co-wrote with Leo Rossi
2023	Lee	Story by, co-executive producer	Co-wrote story with John Collee and Marion Hume

=== Awards and nominations ===
Year	Association	Nominated work	Category	Result	Ref(s)
2025	BAFTA Film Awards	Lee	Outstanding British Film	Nominated	
2019	Golden Raspberry Awards	Gotti	Worst Screenplay	Nominated	
2000	Film Independent Spirit Awards	The Limey	Best Screenplay	Nominated	
1999	Bram Stoker Award	Dark City	Best Screenplay	Won	
1999	Saturn Awards	Dark City	Best Screenplay	Nominated	
1999	Film Critics Circle of Australia Awards	Dark City	Best Screenplay	Won	
1999	Hugo Awards	Dark City	Best Screenplay	Nominated	
1992	Film Independent Spirit Awards	Kafka	Best Screenplay	Nominated	
