= Kafka (film) =

1991 film by Steven Soderbergh

- German theatrical release poster
- Directed by: Steven Soderbergh
- Written by: Lem Dobbs
- Produced by: Harry Benn; Stuart Cornfeld
- Starring: Jeremy Irons; Theresa Russell; Joel Grey; Ian Holm; Jeroen Krabbé; Armin Mueller-Stahl; Alec Guinness
- Cinematography: Walt Lloyd
- Edited by: Steven Soderbergh
- Music by: Cliff Martinez
- Production companies: Baltimore Pictures; Pricel; Renn Productions
- Distributed by: Miramax Films (United States); AMLF (France)
- Release date: November 15, 1991
- Running time: 98 minutes
- Countries: United States; France
- Language: English
- Budget: $12 million
- Box office: $1.1 million

Kafka is a 1991 mystery thriller film directed by Steven Soderbergh, from a screenplay by Lem Dobbs. Ostensibly a biopic based on the life of Franz Kafka, the film blurs the lines between fact and Kafka's fiction (most notably The Castle and The Trial), creating a Kafkaesque atmosphere. It stars Jeremy Irons in the title role, with Theresa Russell, Ian Holm, Jeroen Krabbé, Joel Grey, Armin Mueller-Stahl and Alec Guinness. Simon McBurney appears in his film debut.

Released after Soderbergh's critically acclaimed debut Sex, Lies, and Videotape it was the first of what would be a series of low-budget box-office disappointments. It has since become a cult film, being compared to Terry Gilliam's Brazil and David Cronenberg's Naked Lunch.

== Plot ==
In Prague in 1919, Franz Kafka works as an insurance adjuster while moonlighting as a writer. He gets involved with an underground group after Eduard Rabin, one of his co-workers, is murdered. The underground group, responsible for bombings all over town, attempts to thwart a secret organization that controls the major events in society. He eventually penetrates the secret organization to confront them.

== Cast ==
- Jeremy Irons as Franz Kafka
- Theresa Russell as Gabriela Rossman
- Joel Grey as Mr. Burgel
- Ian Holm as Doctor Murnau
- Jeroen Krabbé as Mr. Bizzlebek
- Armin Mueller-Stahl as Inspector Grubach
- Alec Guinness as the Chief Clerk
- Brian Glover as Castle Henchman
- Keith Allen as Assistant Ludwig
- Simon McBurney as Assistant Oscar
- Robert Flemyng as Keeper of the Files
- Ion Caramitru as Solemn Anarchist
- Vladimír Gut as Eduard Rabin
- Josef Abrhám as Friend of Kafka
- Guy Fithen as Friend of Kafka
- Ondrej Havelka as Friend of Kafka
- Jerome Flynn as Castle attendant
- Ewan Stewart as Castle Attendant
- Jim McPhee as Castle Attendant
- Petr Jákl as Quarry Labourer
- David Jensen as Laughing Man

== Production ==
Lem Dobbs' original screenplay was more of a straightforward biopic of Franz Kafka but Steven Soderbergh rewrote it because he wanted to create a “mystery thriller, not a biography.” Dobbs was dissatisfied with Soderbergh's changes, and the two would not work again until The Limey in 1999. Isabelle Adjani and Anne Parillaud were both considered for the role of Gabriela Rossman. Parillaud was cast in the part and even filmed with Soderbergh and Irons but left after several days due to language barriers.

Filming took place on-location in Kafka's hometown of Prague and at Barrandov Studios. Soderbergh elected to shoot most of the film in black-and-white to evoke German expressionism. Two weeks of reshoots took place at Pinewood Studios in England.

== Reception ==
Kafka was met with mixed reviews from critics. On the review aggregator website Rotten Tomatoes, the film has an approval rating of 55%, based on 22 reviews. The website's consensus reads, "Kafka does not rise to the artistic success of its subject, struggling to approximate the nightmarish absurdity that defined the author's work despite thoughtful direction by Steven Soderbergh and a gorgeous black and white color palette."

=== Awards and nominations ===
Institution	Year	Category	Work	Result
Independent Spirit Awards	1992	Best Screenplay	Lem Dobbs	Nominated
Independent Spirit Awards	1992	Best Cinematography	Walt Lloyd	Won
Turkish Film Critics Association	1994	Best Foreign Film	Steven Soderbergh	4th place

== Alternate version ==
In a 2013 interview with Vulture, Soderbergh stated that the rights to the film had reverted to him and executive producer Paul Rassam and that work had begun on a "completely different" version of the film. Soderbergh reported that he and Lem Dobbs did some rewriting, inserts were shot during the making of Side Effects, and he planned to dub the film into German and release both the original and new version together. In 2020, he announced he had finished the new version and would release it as part of a box set. The new version, titled Mr. Kneff, debuted at the 2021 Toronto International Film Festival.
