= The Limey =

- Theatrical release poster
- Directed by: Steven Soderbergh
- Written by: Lem Dobbs
- Produced by: John Hardy; Scott Kramer
- Starring: Terence Stamp; Lesley Ann Warren; Luis Guzmán; Barry Newman; Peter Fonda; Joe Dallesandro
- Cinematography: Edward Lachman
- Edited by: Sarah Flack
- Music by: Cliff Martinez
- Distributed by: Artisan Entertainment
- Release date: May 15, 1999 (Cannes): October 8, 1999 (United States)
- Running time: 89 minutes
- Country: United States
- Language: English
- Budget: $10 million
- Box office: $3.2 million

The Limey is a 1999 American crime film directed by Steven Soderbergh and written by Lem Dobbs. The film features Terence Stamp, Lesley Ann Warren, Luis Guzmán, Barry Newman, Nicky Katt, Joe Dallesandro, and Peter Fonda. The plot concerns an English career criminal (Stamp) who travels to the United States to investigate the recent suspicious death of his daughter. It was filmed on location in Los Angeles and Big Sur.

Critical reception was positive, but the film was not a financial success upon release, though it has made a cult following over the decades. The film was nominated for five Independent Spirit Awards, including Best Film, Best Director, and Best Screenplay. Stamp and Guzmán were nominated for Best Male Lead and Best Supporting Male Lead respectively.

== Plot ==
English gangster and career criminal Wilson travels to Los Angeles to investigate the death of his daughter, Jenny, who was reported to have died in a car accident; however, Wilson suspects murder. Recently released from prison after nine years, he is a hardened man. Arriving in Los Angeles, he questions Jenny's friends Eduardo and Elaine. Finding that they pass his initial inquiry, he elicits their help in investigating Jenny's death. One suspect who emerges is Terry Valentine, the wealthy record producer Jenny was dating. Valentine was briefly involved in drug trafficking which was managed through his security consultant, Avery. Wilson locates a warehouse used by the drug trafficker and asks about Valentine. They insult his daughter and then beat him up very harshly. Wilson returns to the warehouse, shooting dead all but one of the employees.

Wilson and Eduardo sneak into a party held at Valentine's house. Once there, Wilson searches for evidence of Valentine's involvement. He finds and steals a picture of Jenny. Attracting suspicion from Avery, Wilson is accosted by a guard whom he head-butts and throws over a railing to his death. Wilson and Eduardo flee, only to be chased by Avery, who rams their car and shoots at them. He and Eduardo escape but not before Avery hears Eduardo call out Wilson's name.

Back with Elaine and Eduardo, Wilson reminisces about his earlier life with his daughter, whom he remembers only as a child. Worried her father would be sent away to prison, she would often threaten to call the police whenever she found evidence of the crimes he was involved in or planning. He recalls she had never followed through on her threats because she loved him and it eventually became a sad joke between them. However, his life of crime put a strain on his family. He ended up in prison after the men he was involved with sold him out to the police.

Avery hires a hitman, Stacy, to track down and kill Wilson. Stacy is prevented from making the hit by agents of the DEA, who have been monitoring Valentine. Wilson and Elaine are then taken to meet the head agent, who makes it clear the DEA is after the dealer who used Valentine to launder drug money, and that the agents do not intend to interfere with Wilson's personal mission. He lets Wilson see their file on Valentine, including a photograph and address of a second home in Big Sur. Meanwhile, Stacy and his partner “Uncle John”, angry at their beating at the hands of the DEA agents, plot to double cross their friend Avery.

Avery moves Valentine to the house in Big Sur. That night, Wilson enters the grounds. Avery's guards shoot an intruder who turns out to be Stacy and engages in a shootout with his partner, Uncle John, resulting in several deaths and also fatally wounding Avery. Valentine takes Avery's gun away from him and leaves him to die as he flees to the beach with Wilson in pursuit. The dying Avery takes out his back-up gun and aims it at Wilson but, angry at being deserted by Valentine, lowers it allowing Wilson to continue to pursue Valentine. Valentine shoots at Wilson then falls and breaks his ankle. He continues to shoot at the approaching Wilson but misses and after running out of bullets, he begs for his life. Valentine tells Wilson that Jenny found out about his drug ties and threatened to call the police on him (reminding Wilson of what she had done as a child to him) and in his attempt to stop her Valentine banged Jenny against a wall, accidentally killing her. In an effort to deflect attention from Valentine, Avery staged the car accident. Wilson knows Jenny would never have turned Valentine in. He turns away, allowing Valentine to live. Wilson makes his farewells to Elaine and Eduardo and returns to London.

A younger Wilson plays the folk love song "Colours" on the guitar, while a woman strokes his hair.

== Cast ==
- Terence Stamp as Wilson
- Lesley Ann Warren as Elaine
- Luis Guzmán as Eduardo Roel
- Barry Newman as Jim Avery
- Peter Fonda as Terry Valentine
- Joe Dallesandro as John "Uncle John", The Hitman
- Nicky Katt as Stacy, The Hitman
- Amelia Heinle as Adhara
- Melissa George as Jenny Wilson
- William Lucking as Warehouse Foreman
- Steve Heinze as Larry, Valentine's Bodyguard
- Nancy Lenehan as Lady On Plane
- Bill Duke as DEA Special Agent-In-Charge
- Michaela Gallo as Young Jennifer
- Matthew Kimbrough as Tom
- John Robotham as Rick

== Production ==
=== Directing ===
Steven Soderbergh uses atypical flashback sequences, and includes several scenes (largely without dialogue) from a much older Terence Stamp movie, Ken Loach's 1967 directorial debut Poor Cow. Soderbergh uses the scenes to create a hazy back story to show Stamp's character as a young man, his criminal past, his relationship with Jenny's mother and child Jenny's disapproving attitudes towards his crooked lifestyle. Wilson often speaks in Cockney rhyming slang. The title refers to the American slang "limey", which refers to Britons.

=== Editing ===
Soderbergh and film editor Sarah Flack utilize a variety of unorthodox editing techniques in The Limey. The film frequently features dialogue and background sound from previous or future scenes juxtaposed with a current scene. Dialogue from one conversation, for instance, may find itself dispersed throughout the film, articulated for the first time long after its chronological moment has passed, as a sort of narrative flashback superimposed over later conversation, to complete a character's thought or punctuate a character's emphasis. Background sound may be disjointed in the film and shifted to enhance another scene by suggesting continuation, similarity, or dissimilarity. For example, Wilson is in a hotel room, and turns on the shower, and then Wilson is in an aeroplane looking out of the window, while the shower can be heard.

== Release ==
The Limey was first presented at the 1999 Cannes Film Festival on May 15. It was also featured at the Toronto International Film Festival, the Buenos Aires International Festival of Independent Cinema, and the Hong Kong International Film Festival.

A limited release in the US began on October 8, 1999, and did poorly at the box office. Its first week's gross was $187,122 (17 screens) and the total receipts for the run were $3,193,102. The film was in wide release for seventeen weeks (115 days), and was shown in 105 theaters.

== Reception ==
=== Critical response ===
Critical reception of The Limey was largely positive. On the review aggregator website Rotten Tomatoes, 92% of 87 critics' reviews are positive, with an average rating of 7.4/10. The website's consensus reads: "Crafted with eccentric moodiness and style by Steven Soderbergh, The Limey is also a gritty neo-noir showcase for the talent of leading man Terence Stamp." Metacritic, which uses a weighted average, assigned the film a score of 73 out of 100, based on 32 critics, indicating "generally favorable" reviews.

Edward Guthmann, film critic of the San Francisco Chronicle, praised the direction and screenplay, and wrote, "The Limey ... is a first-rate crime thriller and further proof that Soderbergh is one of our great contemporary film stylists. Taut, imaginative and complex, this is one of the best American films of the year and a wonderful antidote to the numbing sameness of [some] movies." Critic Janet Maslin wrote of Terence Stamp's work, "Stamp plays the title role furiously, with single-minded intensity, wild blue eyes and a stentorian roar shown off in the film's early moments ... Glimpses of young, dreamily beautiful Stamp and his no less imposing latter-day presence are used by Soderbergh with touching efficacy."

The film critic for Variety magazine, Emanuel Levy, lauded the crime drama and liked the direction of the picture, the acting, and the screenplay, yet thought the film "lacks secondary characters and subplots." He wrote, "The Limey, Steven Soderbergh's new crime picture, continues the helmer's artistic renewal, evident last year in the superbly realized Out of Sight. Pic's most interesting element is the positioning of two icons of 1960s cinema, the very British Terence Stamp and the very American Peter Fonda, as longtime enemies in what's basically a routine revenge thriller ... [and] one has no problem praising the bravura acting of the entire ensemble and the pic's impressive technical aspects. Warren, Guzman and Barry Newman give maturely restrained performances in line with the film's dominant texture. A supporting turn by Joe Dallessandro, Andy Warhol's and Paul Morrissey's regular, accentuates pic's reflexive nature as a commentary on a bygone era of filmmaking."

Roger Ebert of The Chicago Sun-Times gave The Limey 3 stars out of a possible 4. Despite the unusual editing, Ebert described the plot as "basic Ross Macdonald", a reference to the mystery writer whose 1950s and '60s best-sellers set in southern California typically featured doom visited on the young adult children of wealthy parents with dark secrets. Stamp and Fonda, both aging icons of the 1960s, represent different sides of the counterculture: "It is a nice irony that both Valentine and Wilson (the Stamp character) made their money from rock music: Valentine by selling the tickets, Wilson by stealing the receipts of a Pink Floyd concert."

=== Accolades ===
Won

- Satellite Awards: Golden Satellite Award; Best Drama Performance by an Actor in a Motion Picture, Terence Stamp; 2000.
