= List of roles and awards of Matt Bomer =

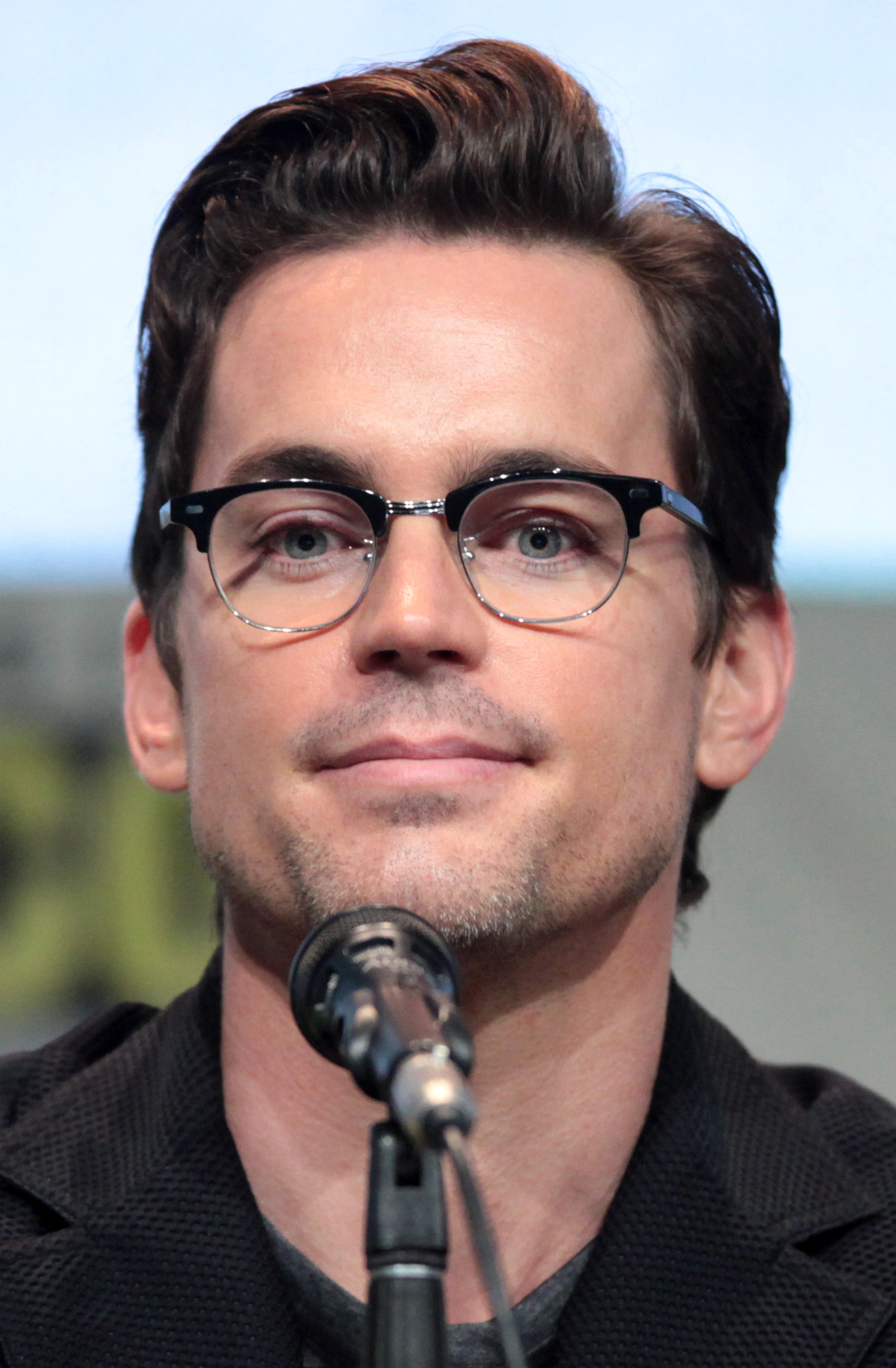
Bomer at the 2015 San Diego Comic-Con

Matt Bomer is an American actor who, as of 2023, has appeared in 23 films, 23 television productions and 6 stage productions. His first stage appearance was at the age of seventeen as the young collector in an Alley production of the play A Streetcar Named Desire, while in high school. Bomer went on to appear in several television shows in the 2000s, including the soap operas All My Children (2000) and Guiding Light (2001-2003), and the supernatural series Tru Calling (2003–2004). He made his film debut as a flight attendant in Robert Schwentke's psychological thriller Flightplan (2005), his highest-grossing release. Bomer's first leading role came in the David DiGilio's drama series, Traveler (2007), he gained a higher profile after that.

From 2009 to 2014, he starred in the USA Network police-procedural drama series White Collar as Neal Caffrey. For his performance in the series he won a People's Choice Award at the 2015 ceremony. He also served as a producer on the series. In 2011, Bomer was cast as a 105-year-old man in Andrew Niccol's science fiction thriller film In Time. The following year, he played a supporting role as a stripper in Steven Soderbergh's comedy drama, Magic Mike (2012). He next portrayed the New York Times reporter Felix Turner in Ryan Murphy's television film The Normal Heart (2014), for which he received his first Golden Globe Award for Best Supporting Actor – Series, Miniseries or Television Film and nomination for Primetime Emmy Award for Outstanding Supporting Actor in a Limited Series or Movie.

In 2015, he reprised his role of Ken in Magic Mike XXL. The following year, he appeared in the neo-noir action comedy The Nice Guys (2016), and in Western action film The Magnificent Seven (2016). Bomer played a hunter in Alex & Andrew Smith's drama Walking Out and a trans woman in Timothy McNeil's drama Anything (both in 2017). In 2018, he made his directorial debut in the second season of Ryan Murphy's anthology series American Crime Story (2016), about the murder of Gianni Versace. Also in 2018, Bomer made his Broadway debut with a revival of The Boys in the Band.

== Credits ==
=== Films ===
Key
†	Denotes films that have not yet been released

Year	Title	Role	Notes	Ref.
2003	War Birds: Diary of an Unknown Aviator	John McGavock Grider	Documentary film	
2005	Flightplan	Eric		
2006	The Texas Chainsaw Massacre: The Beginning	Eric Hill		
2011	In Time	Henry Hamilton		
2012	Magic Mike	Ken		
2013	Superman: Unbound	Superman / Clark Kent	Voice; Animated film	
2014	Winter's Tale	Young Man		
2014	Space Station 76	Ted		
2015	Magic Mike XXL	Ken		
2016	The Nice Guys	John Boy		
2016	The Magnificent Seven	Matthew Cullen		
2017	Walking Out	Cal		
2017	Anything	Freda Von Rhenburg		
2018	Jonathan	Ross Craine		
2018	Papi Chulo	Sean		
2018	Viper Club	Sam		
2020	The Boys in the Band	Donald		
2021	Justice Society: World War II	Barry Allen / Flash	Voice; Animated film	
2022	All Man: The International Male Story	Narrator	Documentary film	
2023	Legion of Super-Heroes	Barry Allen / Flash	Voice; Animated film	
2023	Magic Mike's Last Dance	Ken	Cameo	
2023	Justice League: Warworld	Old Man	Voice; Animated film	
2023	Maestro	David Oppenheim		
2024	Justice League: Crisis on Infinite Earths – Part One	Barry Allen / Flash	Voice; Animated film	
2024	Justice League: Crisis on Infinite Earths – Part Three	Barry Allen / Flash	Voice; Animated film	
2026	Outcome	Xander		

=== Television ===
Year	Title	Role	Notes	Ref.
2000	All My Children	Ian Kipling	Episode: "7485"	
2001–2003	Guiding Light	Ben Reade	Main Cast	
2002	Relic Hunter	Driver Agent	Episode: "Fire in the Sky"	
2004	Tru Calling	Luc Johnston	14 episodes	
2004	North Shore	Ross	Episode: "Bellport"	
2005	Amy Coyne	Chase	Television film	
2007	Traveler	Jay Burchell	8 episodes	
2007–2009	Chuck	Bryce Larkin	7 episodes	
2009–2014	White Collar	Neal Caffrey	81 episodes; also producer (19 episodes)	
2012	Glee	Cooper Anderson	Episode: "Big Brother"	
2013	The New Normal	Monty	Episode: "The Goldie Rush"	
2014	The Normal Heart	Felix Turner	Television film	
2014	Hunted: The War Against Gays in Russia	Narrator	Documentary	
2014	American Horror Story: Freak Show	Andy Stiles	Episode: "Pink Cupcakes"	
2015–2016	American Horror Story: Hotel	Donovan Holloway	9 episodes	
2016–2017	The Last Tycoon	Monroe Stahr	9 episodes	
2018	The Assassination of Gianni Versace: American Crime Story	None	Director; Episode: "Creator / Destroyer"	
2018, 2023	Titans	Larry Trainor / Negative Man (voice)	2 episodes	
2018–2020	Will & Grace	McCoy Whitman	6 episodes	
2019–2023	Doom Patrol	Larry Trainor / Negative Man	Main role	
2020	The Sinner	Jamie Burns	8 episodes	
2021	American Horror Stories	Michael Winslow	2 episodes	
2022	Echoes	Jack Beck	7 episodes	
2023	Fellow Travelers	Hawkins "Hawk" Fuller	8 episodes; also executive producer	
2025	Mid-Century Modern	Jerry Frank	10 episodes; also executive producer	

=== Stage ===
Year	Title	Role	Notes	Ref.
1995	A Streetcar Named Desire	Young Collector	Alley Theatre	
1998	Joseph and the Amazing Technicolor Dreamcoat	Issachar	Utah Shakespeare Festival	
2003	Roulette	Jock	Powerhouse Theater	
2007	Villa America	Ernest Hemingway	Williamstown Theatre Festival	
2011	8	Jeff Zarrillo	Eugene O'Neill Theatre	
2012	8	Jeff Zarrillo	Wilshire Ebell Theatre	
2018	The Boys in The Band	Donald	Booth Theatre	
2026	Jesus Christ Superstar	King Herod	Theatre Royal, Drury Lane	

=== Audio ===
Year	Title	Role	Notes	Ref.
2025	A Little Life	Narrator	Audiobook	

== Discography ==
Year	Soundtrack	Song	Notes	Label	Ref.
2012	Glee: The Music, The Complete Season Three	"Hungry Like the Wolf/Rio"	Uncredited; as Glee Cast	Columbia Records	
2012	Glee: The Music, The Complete Season Three	"Somebody That I Used to Know"	Uncredited; as Glee Cast	Columbia Records	
2015	Magic Mike XXL (Original Motion Picture Soundtrack)	"Heaven"		WaterTower Music	
2015	Magic Mike XXL (Original Motion Picture Soundtrack)	"Untitled (How Does It Feel)"		WaterTower Music	
2019	Non-album singles	"People Like Us" (feat. Alan Mingo Jr.)		WaterTower Music	

== Awards and nominations ==
Association	Year (Note: Indicates the year of ceremony. Each year is linked to the article about the awards held that year, wherever possible.)	Recipient(s)	Category	Result	Ref.
Astra TV Awards	2024	Fellow Travelers	Best Actor in a Limited Series or TV Movie	Nominated	
Astra TV Awards	2025	Mid-Century Modern	Best Cast Ensemble in a Streaming Comedy Series	Nominated	
Broadway.com Audience Awards	2019	The Boys in the Band	Favorite Featured Actor in a Play	Nominated	
Broadway.com Audience Awards	2019	The Boys in the Band	Favorite Breakthrough Performance (Male)	Nominated	
Critics' Choice Television Awards	2014	The Normal Heart	Best Supporting Actor in a Movie/Miniseries	Won	
Critics' Choice Television Awards	2024	Fellow Travelers	Best Actor in a Movie/Miniseries	Nominated	
Critics' Choice Super Awards	2024	Doom Patrol	Best Actor in a Superhero Series, Limited Series or Made-for-TV Movie	Nominated	
Dorian Awards	2015	The Normal Heart	TV Performance of the Year — Actor	Nominated	
Dorian Awards	2024	Fellow Travelers	Best TV Performance — Drama	Won	
Giffoni Film Festival	2014	Himself	Giffoni Award	Honored	
GLSEN Awards	2012	Himself	Inspiration Award	Honored	
Golden Globe Awards	2015	The Normal Heart	Best Supporting Actor – Series, Miniseries or Television Film	Won	
Golden Globe Awards	2024	Fellow Travelers	Best Actor – Miniseries or Television Film	Nominated	
Human Rights Campaign	2023	Himself	Impact Award	Honored	
MTV Movie & TV Awards	2013	Magic Mike	Best Musical Moment	Nominated	
Miami Film Festival	2026	Himself	Vanguard Award	Honored	
NewNowNext Awards	2010	Himself	Cause You're Hot	Nominated	
Peabody Awards	2024	Fellow Travelers	Entertainment (Note: As executive producer)	Won	
People's Choice Awards	2015	Himself	Favorite Cable TV Actor	Won	
People's Choice Awards	2024	Fellow Travelers	The TV Performance of the Year	Nominated	
Primetime Emmy Awards	2014	The Normal Heart	Outstanding Supporting Actor in a Limited or Anthology Series or Movie	Nominated	
Primetime Emmy Awards	2024	Fellow Travelers	Outstanding Lead Actor in a Limited or Anthology Series or Movie	Nominated	
Queerty Awards	2013	Himself	Fab Gay Dad	Nominated	
Queerty Awards	2020	Papi Chulo	Film Performance	Nominated	
Queerty Awards	2020	Himself	Woof Worthy Influencer	Nominated	
Queerty Awards	2024	Fellow Travelers	TV Performance	Nominated	
Queerty Awards	2025	Himself	Style Icon	Nominated	
Satellite Awards	2015	The Normal Heart	Best Supporting Actor – Series, Miniseries or Television Film	Nominated	
Satellite Awards	2024	Fellow Travelers	Best Actor – Miniseries or Television Film	Nominated	
SCAD Savannah Film Festival	2014	Himself	Spotlight Award	Honored	
SCAD TVFest	2024	Himself	Trailblazer Award	Honored	
Screen Actors Guild Awards	2024	Fellow Travelers	Outstanding Performance by a Male Actor in a Miniseries or Television Movie	Nominated	
TV Guide Awards	2014	White Collar	Favorite Duo	Nominated	
