= Only One of You =

Single by Luke Evans
- Released: May 30, 2025
- Genre: Pop
- Length: 3:03
- Label: Hi-Tea
- Songwriters: Luke Evans; Amy Wadge; Alex Stacey
- Producer: Sam Every-Baker

Luke Evans singles chronology
"Always Be My Man" (2023)	"Only One of You" (2025)

"Only One of You" is a song by Welsh singer and actor, Luke Evans. It was released on May 30, 2025, through Hi-Tea Records, accompanied by a remix by Rosane Amaral. The release marked Evans' first new music in two years, following his 2023 collaboration with Billy Porter on the song "Always Be My Man" for the motion picture Our Son.

== Background and release ==
"Only One of You" was written by Luke Evans, Amy Wadge, and Alex Stacey, with Sam Every-Baker serving as the producer. The song marked a departure from Evans' typical orchestral style, featured on his first two albums, as he adopted a more contemporary pop sound.

The track was officially released on May 30, accompanied by a house remix by record producer Rosane Amaral. Evans also used the song to promote his underwear line, BXDY, which he co-founded with his husband, Fran Tomas, through social media.

"'Only One Of You' is OUT NOW, listen on all your usual streaming platforms. I’m so excited to finally be able to share this special song with you! A very awesome house version is also available mixed by the brilliant @rosaneamaral – LINK IN BIO."

— Luke Evans release post, on Instagram

On June 27, a second remix, produced by DJ Eliad Cohen, was released to further promote the track.

== Reception ==
"Only One of You" received favorable reviews from music critics. Writing for CelebMix, Philip Logan described the song as "heartfelt" and "an anthem for the underdog."

Isabella I. of Instinct referred to it as "a breezy, feel-good love song" and praised Evans' vocals, dubbing him "your new favorite pop prince of summer." Eugene Sun, also of Instinct, reviewed the Eliad Cohen remix, offering high praise by stating, "This team-up isn’t just a remix. It’s a moment—a sweaty, euphoric, serotonin-soaked moment."

== Track listing ==
- Digital download and streaming – Single
1. "Only One of You" – 3:03
2. "Only One of You" (Rosane Amaral Remix) – 5:41
- Digital download and streaming – Eliad Cohen Remix
1. "Only One of You" (Eliad Cohen Remix) – 2:34
2. "Only One of You" – 3:03
3. "Only One of You" (Rosane Amaral Remix) – 5:41

== Personnel ==
Credits adapted from Apple Music.

- Luke Evans — lead vocals, songwriter
- Sam Every-Baker — producer, arranger, programming, piano, drums, bass guitar, acoustic guitar
- Amy Wadge — songwriter
- Alex Stacey — songwriter
- Pete Maher — mastering engineer

== Release history ==
"Only One of You" release history
Region	Date	Format(s)	Label	Version	Ref.
Various	30 May 2025	Digital download; streaming	Hi-Tea Records	Original	
Various	30 May 2025	Digital download; streaming	Hi-Tea Records	Rosane Amaral Remix	
Various	27 June 2025	Digital download; streaming	Hi-Tea Records	Eliad Cohen Remix	
