= Luke Evans =

Welsh actor and singer (born 1979)

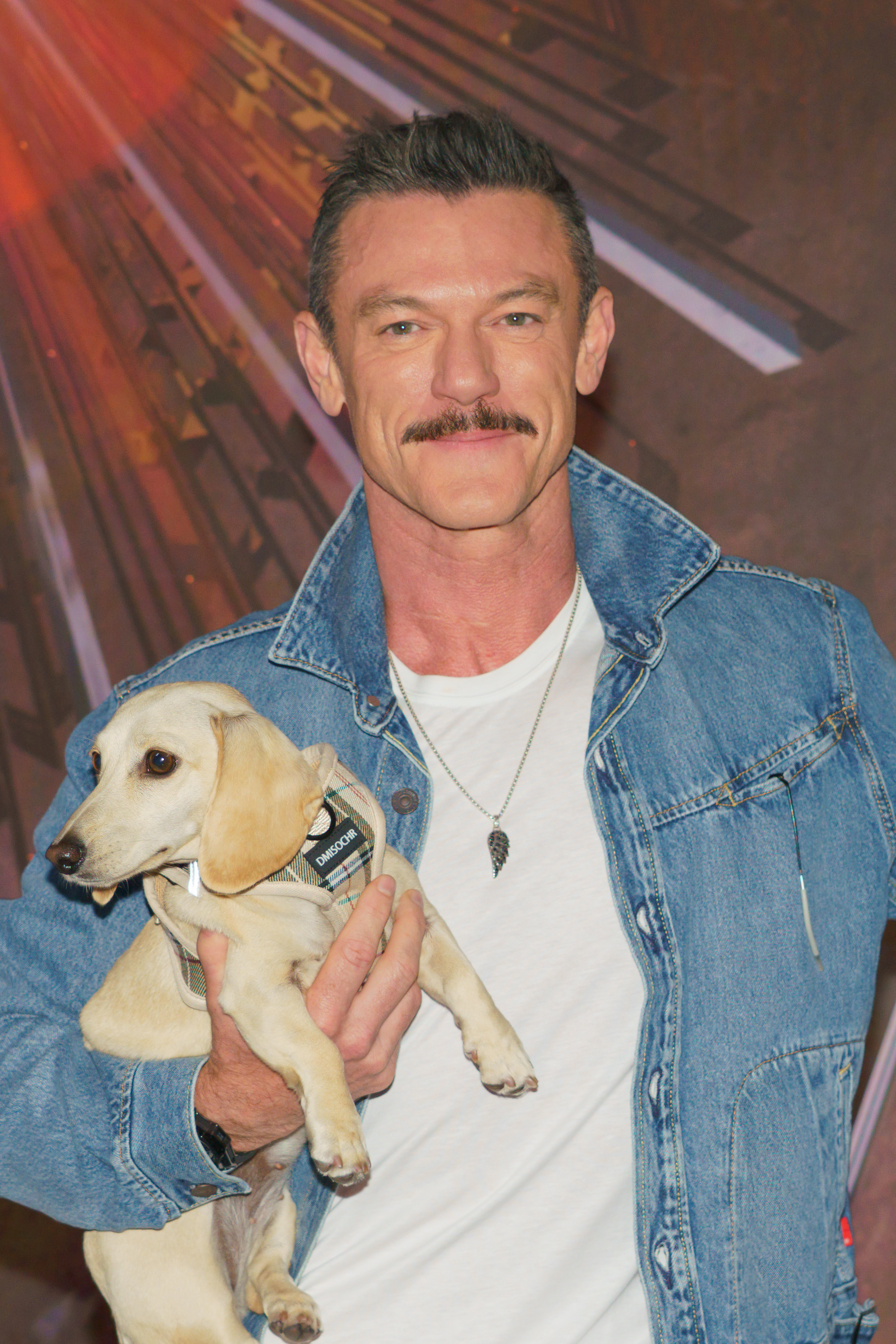
- Evans with his dog Lala in 2026
- Born: 15 April 1979 (age 47); Pontypool, Torfaen, Wales
- Education: London Studio Centre
- Occupations: Actor; singer
- Years active: 2000–present
- Musical career
- Genres: Pop; soul
- Label: BMG
- Website: lukeevansofficial.com

Luke George Evans (born 15 April 1979) is a Welsh actor and singer. He began his career on the stage, and performed in London's West End productions of Taboo, Rent, Miss Saigon, and Piaf before making his film breakthrough in the 2010 remake of Clash of the Titans. Following his debut, Evans was cast in the action and thriller films Immortals (2011), The Raven (2012), and the reimagined The Three Musketeers (2011).

In 2013, Evans starred as the antagonist Owen Shaw in Fast & Furious 6, and also played Bard the Bowman in Peter Jackson's three-part adaptation of J. R. R. Tolkien's The Hobbit. Evans portrayed the vampire Dracula in the character's 2014 film origin story Dracula Untold. Evans then portrayed Gaston in Disney's live-action adaptation of Beauty and the Beast (2017), psychologist William Moulton Marston in the biographical drama Professor Marston and the Wonder Women (2017), played a lead role as John Schuyler Moore in Seasons 1 and 2 of The Alienist (2018–2020), Wade McClusky in Midway, and the Coachman in Disney's live-action remake of Pinocchio (2022). He released his debut album, At Last, on 22 November 2019. In 2021, he had a main role in the Hulu drama series Nine Perfect Strangers. Evans starred in the 2026 production of The Rocky Horror Show on Broadway, for which he received a Tony Award nomination.

== Early life and education ==
Luke George Evans was born on Easter Sunday, 15 April 1979, in Pontypool, Wales. He was brought up in Aberbargoed. Evans is the only child of Yvonne and David Evans. He was raised as a Jehovah's Witness, though he left the religion when he was 16 and left school at the same time.

At age 17, Evans moved to Cardiff, where he studied with singing coach Louise Ryan. In 1997, he won a scholarship to London Studio Centre, then located in Kings Cross, London. He graduated in 2000.

== Career ==
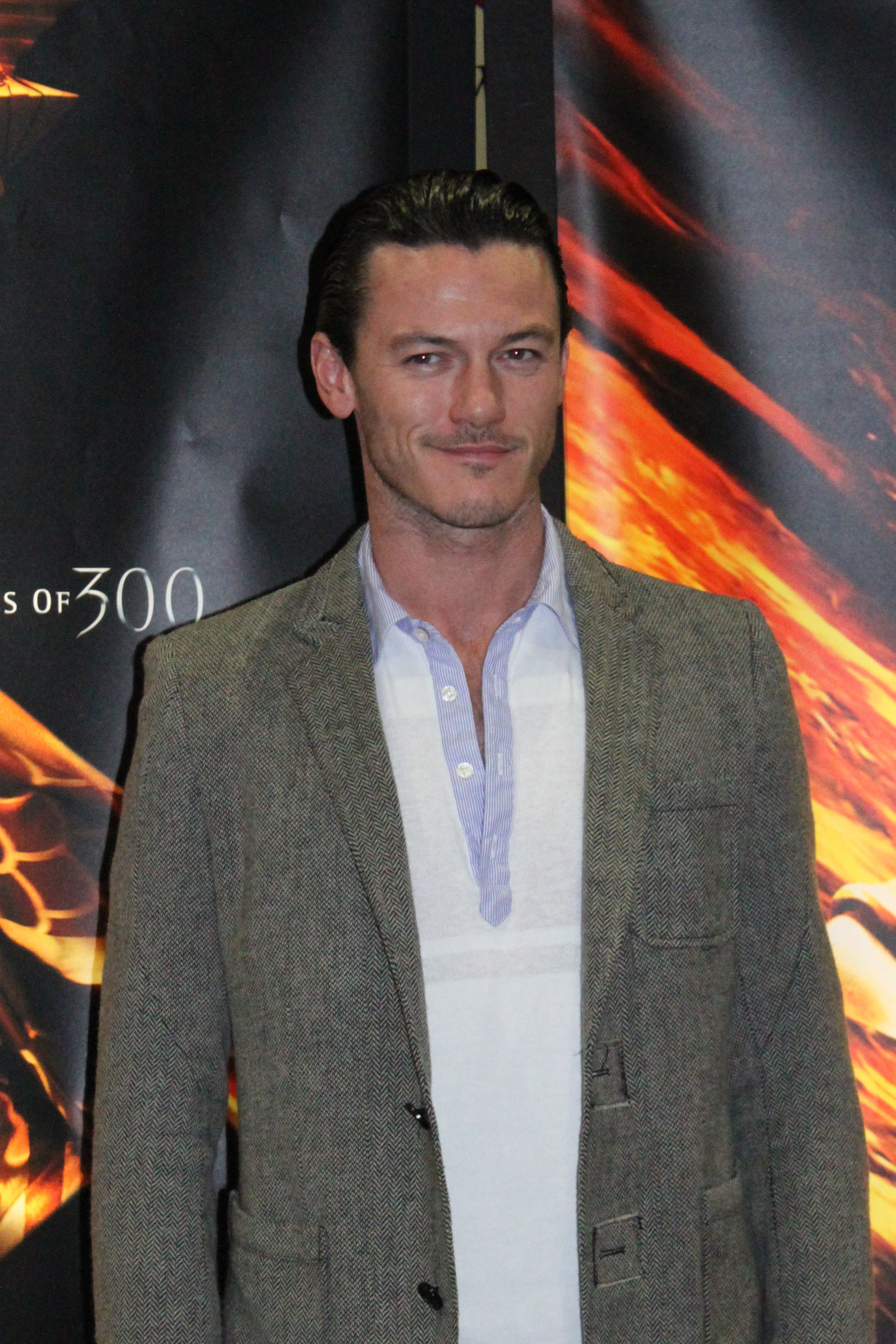
Evans at the 2011 WonderCon

From 2000 to 2008, Evans starred in many West End productions, including La Cava, Taboo, Rent, Miss Saigon and Avenue Q, as well as several fringe shows in London and at the Edinburgh Festival.

In 2008, Evans landed his most significant stage role playing Vincent in the play Small Change written and directed by Peter Gill at the Donmar Warehouse. His performance drew attention from film casting directors and U.S. talent agencies, and he was nominated for the Evening Standard Award for Outstanding Newcomer. Later that year, he did his second show at the Donmar Warehouse, Piaf, in which he played Yves Montand.

Evans had his first film audition at age 30. In 2009, he landed his first film role, playing the Greek god Apollo in the 2010 remake Clash of the Titans. Also in 2010, he appeared as Clive in the film Sex & Drugs & Rock & Roll, directed by Matt Whitecross, as the Sheriff of Nottingham's thug in Robin Hood, alongside Matthew Macfadyen (whom he would later play alongside again in The Three Musketeers), and played handyman and good guy Andy, in director Stephen Frears' film Tamara Drewe, based on Posy Simmond's comic strip. Evans went on to portray DI Craig Stokes in Blitz (2011), the film adaptation of Ken Bruen's novel of the same name, in which he starred with Jason Statham and Paddy Considine. In early 2010, he shot the independent film, Flutter, directed by Giles Borg.

Evans played the Musketeer Aramis in Paul W. S. Anderson's version of The Three Musketeers (filmed in 2010 and released in 2011). He was cast in a lead role in Tarsem Singh's Greek epic, Immortals (2011), in which he played the King of the Gods, Zeus.

At the end of 2010, he took a role opposite John Cusack in James McTeigue's film The Raven, replacing Jeremy Renner. In the film, released in 2012 and set in mid-nineteenth century Baltimore, Evans played Detective Emmett Fields, who investigates a series of murders inspired by the poetry and short stories of Edgar Allan Poe.

In 2011, Evans shot No One Lives, a psychological horror film directed by Ryuhei Kitamura, in New Orleans.

Evans played the role of Bard the Bowman in Peter Jackson's The Hobbit: The Desolation of Smaug (2013) and The Hobbit: The Battle of the Five Armies (2014).

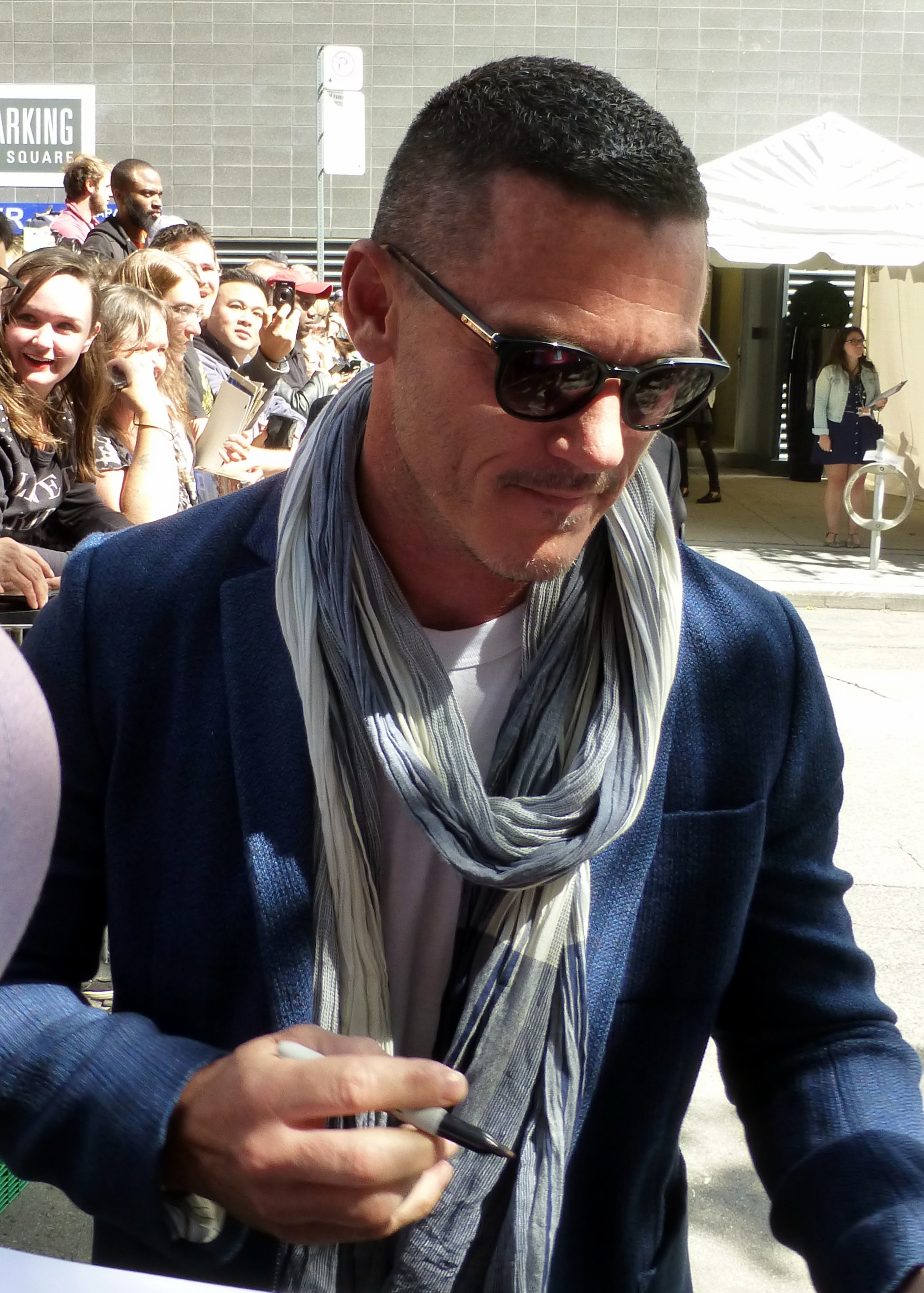
Evans at the 2015 Toronto International Film Festival

In 2013, Evans played the antagonist Owen Shaw in Fast & Furious 6, and in 2014, he played Dracula in the film Dracula Untold. Evans was cast as Eric Draven in the reboot of The Crow. In June 2014, he joined the cast of the film High-Rise with Tom Hiddleston and Jeremy Irons. In January 2015, Evans officially exited The Crow to pursue other projects. The same year, GQ named him one of the 50 best dressed British men.

In 2016, Evans appeared in the thriller film The Girl on the Train, co-starring Emily Blunt. In 2017, he had the villainous role of Gaston in Disney's live-action adaptation of Beauty and the Beast, directed by Bill Condon and co-starring Emma Watson and Dan Stevens. Evans was also set to reprise his role as Gaston in a Beauty and the Beast prequel limited series for Disney+, alongside Josh Gad, who was serving as co-creator, co-writer and executive producer.

Evans played the lead role, William Moulton Marston, the creator of Wonder Woman, in the film Professor Marston and the Wonder Women.

In 2018, Evans starred in the TNT drama The Alienist, as newspaper illustrator John Moore. He released his debut studio album, At Last, on 22 November 2019.

In 2019, Evans starred in Roland Emmerich's war movie Midway, alongside Ed Skrein, Patrick Wilson, Mandy Moore, Aaron Eckhart, Nick Jonas, Dennis Quaid, and Woody Harrelson.

In 2021, Evans played Lars Lee in the Hulu miniseries, Nine Perfect Strangers, based on the novel of the same name by Liane Moriarty, which features Nicole Kidman in the lead role, alongside Melissa McCarthy, Michael Shannon, Samara Weaving, Asher Keddie, and Bobby Cannavale.

Evans also played The Coachman in Robert Zemeckis' live-action film adaptation of Disney's Pinocchio, with Tom Hanks.

Evans was awarded Man of the Year at the ninth annual Virgin Atlantic Attitude Awards.

His 2024 memoir Boy from the Valleys: My Unexpected Journey was published by Ebury Books. The book recounts his isolation as a child in Aberbargoed, his family membership in Jehovah's Witnesses, his first entry in Eisteddfod singing competitions, and his subsequent route to a career as actor and singer.

Evans made his Broadway debut in the role of Dr. Frank-N-Furter in a 2026 revival of The Rocky Horror Show, earning a Tony Award nomination for his performance.

== Personal life ==
Evans is gay, though he prefers not to speak about his personal life. Between 2014 and 2016, he dated actor and model Jon Kortajarena. Since 2021, he has been in a relationship with Fran Tomas.

== Discography ==
=== Studio albums ===
Title	Details	Peak chart positions			Certifications
Title	Details	UK	AUS Dig.	IRE	Certifications
At Last	Released: 22 November 2019; Label: BMG	11	30	84	BPI: Silver
A Song for You	Released: 4 November 2022; Label: BMG	4	—	—	

=== Soundtrack albums ===
Title	Release date
Beauty and the Beast	10 March 2017

=== Singles ===
Title	Year	Album
"Love Is a Battlefield"	2019	At Last
"Changing"	2019	At Last
"Horizons Blue"	2022	A Song for You
"Come What May" (featuring Charlotte Church)	2022	A Song for You
"Say Something" (featuring Nicole Kidman)	2022	A Song for You
"Always Be My Man" (with Billy Porter)	2023	Our Son
"Only One of You"	2025	Non-album single
"One Time Lover" (with Eliad Cohen)	2026	Non-album single

=== Other recorded songs ===
Title	Year	Album
"Smile"	2019	BBC Children In Need: Got It Covered

== Tours ==
- At Last! The Live Tour (2021)

== Acting credits ==
Key
†	Denotes works that have not yet been released

=== Film ===
Year	Film	Role	Notes
2002	Ding Dong	Gareth	Short film
2002	Taboo	Billy	Musical
2009	Don't Press Benjamin's Buttons	Benjamin's Father	Short film
2010	Cowards and Monsters	Paul	Short film
2010	Sex & Drugs & Rock & Roll	Clive Richards	
2010	Clash of the Titans	Apollo	
2010	Robin Hood	Sheriff's Thug	
2010	Tamara Drewe	Andy Cobb	
2011	Blitz	DI Craig Stokes	
2011	The Three Musketeers	Aramis	
2011	Immortals	Zeus	
2011	Flutter	Adrian	
2012	Ashes	Crewcut	
2012	The Raven	Inspector Emmett Fields	
2012	No One Lives	Driver	
2012	The Hobbit: An Unexpected Journey	Girion, Lord of Dale	Extended edition only
2013	Fast & Furious 6	Owen Shaw	
2013	The Hobbit: The Desolation of Smaug	Bard and Girion, Lord of Dale	Dual role
2014	Dracula Untold	Vlad III Țepeș / Dracula	
2014	The Hobbit: The Battle of the Five Armies	Bard	
2015	Furious 7	Owen Shaw	Cameo
2015	High-Rise	Richard Wilder	
2016	Message from the King	Dr. Paul Wentworth	
2016	The Girl on the Train	Scott Hipwell	
2017	Beauty and the Beast	Gaston	
2017	The Fate of the Furious	Owen Shaw	Cameo
2017	Professor Marston and the Wonder Women	William Moulton Marston	
2018	State Like Sleep	Emile	
2018	10x10	Robert Lewis	
2019	Ma	Ben Hawkins	
2019	Murder Mystery	Charles Cavendish	
2019	Anna	Alex Tchenkov	
2019	StarDog and TurboCat	Felix (voice)	
2019	Angel of Mine	Mike	
2019	Midway	Commander Wade McClusky	
2021	Crisis	Dr. Bill Simons	
2022	Pinocchio	The Coachman	
2022	Scrooge: A Christmas Carol	Ebenezer Scrooge (voice)	
2023	Our Son	Nicky	
2023	Good Grief	Oliver	
2024	Weekend in Taipei	John Lawlor	
2024	5lbs of Pressure	Adam	
2025	World Breaker	Dad	
2026	The Get Out	John Carver	
2026	The Housewife †	TBA	Post-production

=== Television ===
Year	Title	Role	Notes
2013	The Great Train Robbery	Bruce Reynolds	Miniseries
2016, 2018	Robot Chicken	Various characters (voices)	2 episodes
2017	The Grand Tour	Himself	Episode: "Jaaaaaaaags"
2018–2020	The Alienist	John Moore	Main role
2020–2021	Crossing Swords	King Merriman (voice)	Main role; 20 episodes
2021	The Pembrokeshire Murders	Steve Wilkins	Miniseries; 3 episodes
2021	Nine Perfect Strangers	Lars Lee	Main role; 8 episodes
2022–2023	Echo 3	Bambi	Main role
2024	The Way	Hogwood	Miniseries (2 episodes)
2026	The Party †	Martin Gilmour	Also executive producer
2027	Criminal †	Tracy Lawless	

=== Theatre ===
Year	Title	Role	Venue
2002–2003	Taboo	Billy	Leicester Square Theatre
2003	Miss Saigon	Chris Scott	UK Tour
2006	Avenue Q	Ensemble u/s Princeton/Rod u/s Trekkie Monster/Nicky/Bear u/s Brian	Noël Coward Theatre, West End
2007–2008	Rent	Roger Davis	Duke of York's Theatre, West End
2008	Small Change	Vincent	Donmar Warehouse
2008	Piaf	Yves/Raymond/Jacques	Donmar Warehouse
2009	Piaf	Yves/Raymond/Jacques	Vaudeville Theatre, West End
2023–2024	Backstairs Billy	Billy	Duke of York's Theatre, West End
2026	The Rocky Horror Show	Dr. Frank-N-Furter	Studio 54, Broadway

=== Video games ===
Year	Title	Voice role	Notes
2013	Fast & Furious: Showdown	Owen Shaw	

=== Theme park rides ===
Year	Title	Voice role	Notes
2015	Fast & Furious: Supercharged	Owen Shaw	

== Awards and nominations ==
Year	Award	Category	Nominee / work	Result
2014	Monte-Carlo Television Festival	Outstanding Actor in a Mini-Series	The Great Train Robbery	Nominated
2014	Acapulco Black Film Festival	Best Ensemble Cast	Fast & Furious 6	Nominated
2015	British Independent Film Awards	Best Supporting Actor	High-Rise	Nominated
2017	MTV Movie & TV Awards	Best Duo (with Josh Gad)	Beauty and the Beast	Nominated
2017	Teen Choice Awards	Choice Movie: Villain	Beauty and the Beast	Won
2017	Teen Choice Awards	Choice Hissy Fit	Beauty and the Beast	Nominated
2020	Virgin Atlantic Attitude Awards	The Man of the Year	Himself	Won
2023	BAFTA Cymru Awards	Entertainment Programme	Luke Evans: Showtime!	Won
2026	Drama League Award	Distinguished Performance	The Rocky Horror Show	Nominated
2026	Outer Critics Circle Award	Outstanding Performer in a Broadway Musical	The Rocky Horror Show	Nominated
2026	Broadway.com Audience Choice Awards	Favorite Leading Actor in a Musical	The Rocky Horror Show	Nominated
2026	Broadway.com Audience Choice Awards	Favorite Diva Performance	The Rocky Horror Show	Nominated
2026	Broadway.com Audience Choice Awards	Favorite Breakthrough Performance (Male)	The Rocky Horror Show	Won
2026	Tony Awards	Best Performance by a Leading Actor in a Musical	The Rocky Horror Show	Nominated
2026	Dorian Award	Outstanding Lead Performance in a Broadway Musical	The Rocky Horror Show	Nominated
2026	Dorian Award	LGBTQ Theater Artist of the Season		Nominated
