= Jelani Alladin =

American actor, singer, and dancer (born 1992)

- Born: August 6, 1992 (age 34); New York City, U.S.
- Education: New York University (BFA)
- Occupations: Actor; singer; dancer
- Years active: 2016–present

Jelani Alladin (born August 6, 1992) is an American actor, singer, and dancer. In his Broadway debut, he originated the role of Kristoff in the Frozen musical in 2018. Alladin is best known for starring as Marcus Gaines in the 2023 miniseries Fellow Travelers.

== Early life and education ==
Alladin grew up in the Brownsville neighborhood of Brooklyn in New York City. He attended high school in New Canaan, Connecticut, where he was an athlete and a performer, playing lacrosse and participating in track as well as performing lead roles such as the Emcee in Cabaret and The Cat in the Hat in Seussical.

He then attended the New York University's Tisch School of the Arts, where he studied a variety of acting styles including cinema acting, song and dance acting, and vocal performance.

== Career ==
Alladin starred in the Off-Broadway show Sweetee as Cat Jones and received the San Francisco Critics Circle Award for Best Leading Actor as Pharus in Choir Boy. Other regional credits include I and You (TheatreSquared), The History Boys (Palmbeach Dramaworks), Violet (Clarence Brown Theatre), and the world premiere of Josephine (Asolo Rep). Alladin has also appeared Off-Broadway at York Theatre in the New York City premiere of Lord Tom and a revival of Don't Bother Me I Can't Cope. In Alladin's Broadway debut, he played the role of Kristoff in the 2018 musical Frozen. He left Frozen after a year to play the role of Hercules in the musical Hercules.

Alladin's film and television career began in 2014. On the film side, he starred in Tick, Tick... Boom! and Respect. On the TV side, he guest starred on FBI and Blue Bloods and recurred on The Walking Dead: World Beyond, 9-1-1: Nashville, and Law & Order: Special Victims Unit. He starred in the miniseries Fellow Travelers as Marcus Gaines; the series won a Peabody Award for "Chronicling LGBTQ+ History Over 50 Years."

== Filmography ==
=== Film ===
Year	Title	Role	Notes	Ref.
2014	High Noon on the West Side	Deke	Short	
2015	There Is Love	The Waiter	Short	
2017	I Didn't Come Here to Make Love	Jelani	Short	
2020	Influenced	Sheldon	Short	
2021	Respect	Jason		
2021	Tick, Tick... Boom!	David		
2022	One Hit Wonder	Eugene	Short	
2024	Beneath the Fold	Stanley		
2025	Strangers On a Beach	Calvin	Short	
TBA	C-Side †	Sasha	Post-production	

Key
†	Denotes films that have not yet been released

=== Television ===
Year	Title	Role	Notes	Ref.
2017	The Weirdos Next Door	Luke Welker	Webseries	
2020	FBI	Alex Bryant	Episode: "Broken Promises"	
2020	Law & Order: Special Victims Unit	Sean Thomas	Episode: "Remember Me in Quarantine"	
2020–2021	The Walking Dead: World Beyond	Will Campbell	12 episodes	
2023	Fellow Travelers	Marcus Gaines	8 episodes	
2024	Blue Bloods	Jaylen Davis	Episode: "No Good Deed"	
2026	9-1-1: Nashville	Jalen Fox	2 episodes	
2026	Law & Order: Special Victims Unit	ADA Aidan Hawkins	2 episodes	
