= Matt Bomer =

American actor (born 1977)

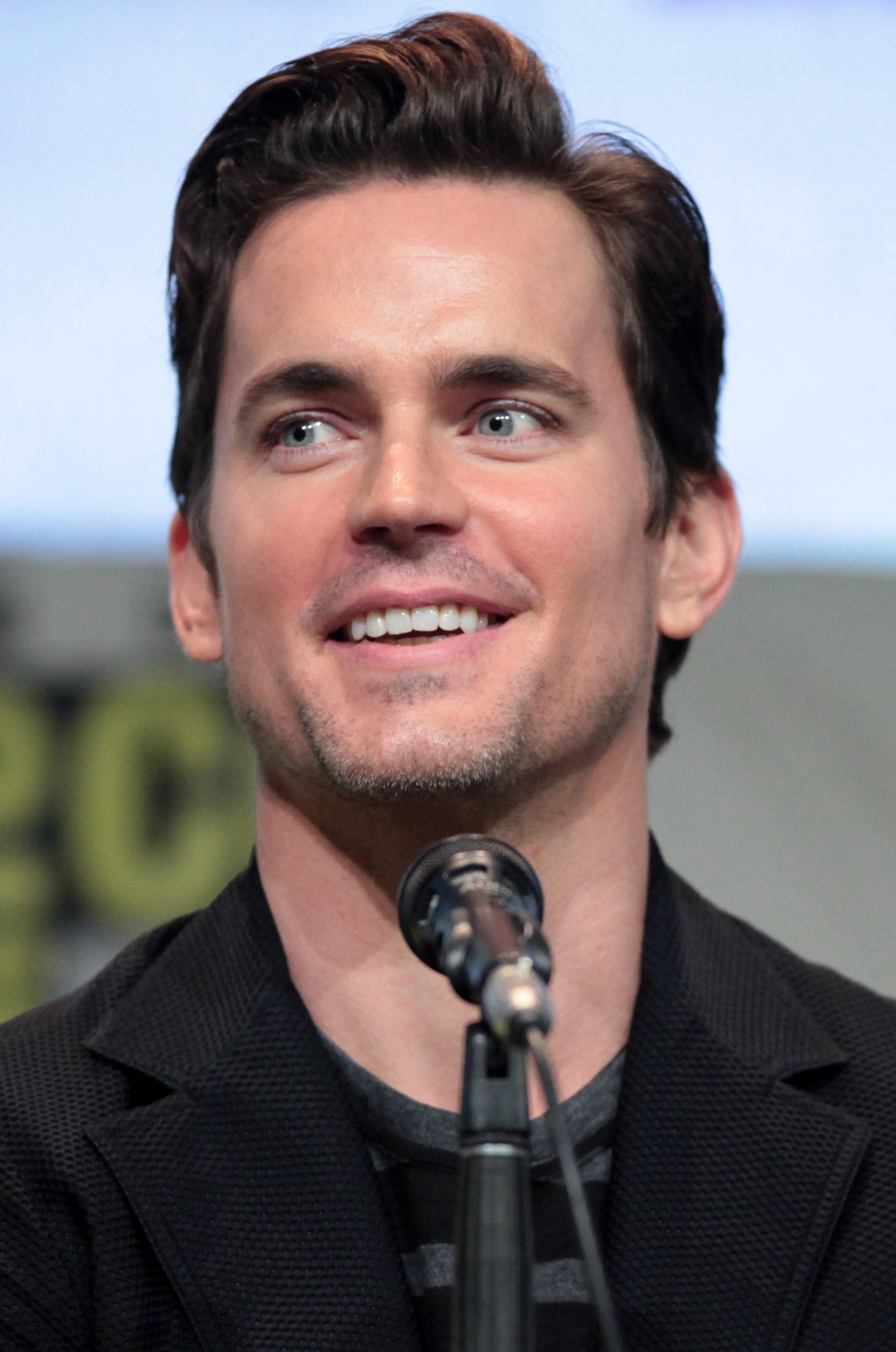
- Bomer at the 2015 San Diego Comic-Con
- Born: Matthew Staton Bomer; October 11, 1977 (age 49); Webster Groves, Missouri, U.S.
- Education: Carnegie Mellon University (BFA)
- Occupation: Actor
- Years active: 1994–present
- Works: Roles and awards
- Spouse: Simon Halls (m. 2011)
- Children: 3

Matthew Staton Bomer (/ˈboʊmər/ BOH-mər; born October 11, 1977) is an American actor. His works have earned him accolades including a Golden Globe Award, a Critics' Choice Television Award, and a Peabody Award, in addition to nominations for two Primetime Emmy Awards.

Bomer made his television debut in 2000 on the long-running soap opera All My Children. He graduated from Carnegie Mellon University with a Bachelor of Fine Arts degree. Soon after, he had a contract role on Guiding Light, and appeared on primetime shows, including Tru Calling. In 2005, Bomer made his film debut with a small role in the thriller Flightplan, starring Jodie Foster, then in 2007 gained recognition with his recurring role in the NBC television series Chuck. From 2009 to 2014, he starred as con artist Neal Caffrey in the USA Network series White Collar.

Bomer had supporting roles in the 2011 thriller In Time, the 2012 comedy-drama Magic Mike and its 2015 sequel, and the 2016 neo-noir film The Nice Guys. In 2015, he won a Golden Globe Award and received a nomination for a Primetime Emmy Award for playing a closeted writer in the television film The Normal Heart. Bomer made a guest appearance on the fourth season of FX's horror anthology series American Horror Story, and was upgraded to the main cast for its fifth season. He has since starred as Larry Trainor in the Max series Doom Patrol (2019–2023) and a closeted World War II veteran in the miniseries Fellow Travelers (2023). The latter earned him further Golden Globe and Primetime Emmy Award nominations. As an executive producer of Fellow Travelers, Bomer also received a Peabody Award.

On stage, Bomer starred in the Dustin Lance Black play 8 on Broadway, and at the Wilshire Ebell Theatre in Los Angeles as Jeff Zarrillo, a plaintiff in the federal case that overturned California's Proposition 8. In 2018 he starred in a revival of the Mart Crowley play The Boys in the Band on Broadway playing Donald; he reprised his role for the 2020 film of the same name.

== Early life and education ==
Matthew Staton Bomer was born in Webster Groves, Missouri, to Elizabeth Macy (née Staton) and John O'Neill Bomer IV. His father, a Dallas Cowboys draft pick, played for the team from 1972 to 1974. Matt has a sister, Megan, and a brother, Neill, who is an engineer. Bomer credits his parents for being understanding when they sensed their child was slightly different from his peers. "I've always had an active imagination", says Bomer. He is a distant cousin to American singer Justin Timberlake. Bomer's family is of English, Welsh, Scottish, Irish, Swiss-German and French descent.

Bomer was raised in Spring, Texas, and attended Klein High School; he was a classmate of Lee Pace and Lynn Collins. In high school, Bomer played wide receiver and defensive back for his school's football team before deciding to concentrate on acting.

At age 17, he made his stage debut as Young Collector in a production of Tennessee Williams's A Streetcar Named Desire staged by the Alley Theatre in downtown Houston. He also appeared in a 1998 production of Joseph and the Amazing Technicolor Dreamcoat and Romeo and Juliet at the Utah Shakespeare Festival in Cedar City, Utah.

Bomer received his Bachelor of Fine Arts degree in drama at Carnegie Mellon University in 2000. In 1999, Bomer worked as a bartender while spending a year living in Galway, Ireland.

== Career ==
=== 2000–2004: Early roles ===
Shortly after graduating from Carnegie Mellon University, Bomer moved to New York City. His television debut came in 2000 on the ABC network, when he played Ian Kipling on the long running soap opera All My Children. Two years later he made a guest appearance in the mystery fantasy series Relic Hunter (2002).

In 2001, he landed a contract role on the soap opera Guiding Light. He played Ben Reade, a character connected to several core families on the show. When Bomer left the show in 2003, his exit was controversial; Ben was suddenly revealed to be a male prostitute and serial killer. Years later in 2015, Bomer talked about his participation in the series: "I told them to just throw the kitchen sink at me, and they did."

His next role was in the supernatural drama series Tru Calling (2003–2004). Starring alongside Eliza Dushku, Bomer starred as Luc Johnston, the love interest of the protagonist of the series played by Dushku, in the first season. In 2003, Bomer returned to theatre to star in a Powerhouse Theater production of Paul Weitz's play Roulette in New York. A year later, he appeared in the episode Bellport in the primetime TV show of North Shore.

=== 2005–2009: Transition to film and breakthrough with White Collar ===
His screen debut occurred in the 2005 starring in the Robert Schwentke directed mystery thriller Flightplan, opposite Jodie Foster. Bomer's character was a flight attendant. The film grossed $223.3 million worldwide, becoming the seventeenth highest-grossing film of the year and Bomer's most lucrative film so far. In the slasher film The Texas Chainsaw Massacre: The Beginning (2006), Bomer portrayed Eric, a Vietnam War veteran who is driving across Texas to re-enlist after his brother is drafted.

He acted in his first television film Amy Coyne (2006); he played the role of Case. The film tells the story of a young woman who inherits her father's sports agency. His first leading role was in the series Traveler (2007), along with Logan Marshall-Green, Aaron Stanford and Viola Davis, a short-lived midseason replacement television series which premiered on ABC on May 30, 2007, the series tells the story of two graduate students, become suspected of terrorism after a skateboarding race inside a museum. The series was canceled after eight episodes.

He had a supporting role in the NBC action comedy spy-drama Chuck (2007–09). In 2007, Bomer took on the role of Ernest Hemingway in a Williamstown Theatre Festival production of Crispin Whittell's play Villa America in Massachusetts, starring in it with Jennifer Mudge and Nate Corddry.

2009 marked a significant turning point in Bomer's career as he starred as the con artist Neal Caffrey in the police procedural drama series White Collar. White Collar premiered on August 23, 2009, on USA Network and was watched by more than 5.40 million people. The show was received with popular and critical acclaim. Mary McNamara of the Los Angeles Times wrote: "terrific acting, crackling dialogue and geek-hip crime are not the only things that make this the most electric drama to premiere this fall." She also liked the performance of the two leads together saying they "are so easy" and "perfect together". Bomer won a People's Choice Award at the 2015 ceremony. Additionally, Bomer produced 19 episodes of White Collar along with costar Tim DeKay.

=== 2010–2015: Recognition ===
In the beginning of 2010 Bomer was invited to sing with actress and Tony Award winning singer Kelli O'Hara at the Kennedy Center Honors. In September 2011, Bomer starred in Dustin Lance Black's play, 8, a staged re-enactment of the federal trial that overturned California's Proposition 8. Bomer starred as Jeff Zarrillo. The production was directed by actor Joe Mantello and presented at the Eugene O'Neill Theatre in New York City. In March 2012, he was featured in the Wilshire Ebell Theatre production as well.

In 2011, Bomer was cast as a 105-year-old man in Andrew Niccol's science fiction thriller film In Time, starring alongside Justin Timberlake. On April 10, 2012, Bomer made a guest appearance in the third season of the television series Glee, playing Blaine's older brother, Cooper Anderson, a Hollywood commercials actor who comes to Lima for a visit, and while in town gives an acting masterclass to New Directions. His performance on Glee received critical acclaim; critic Emily St. James of The A.V. Club described his performance as "absolutely fantastic." Crystal Bell of the Huffington Post called his appearance "perfectly cast" and Bomer as one of her favorite guest stars.

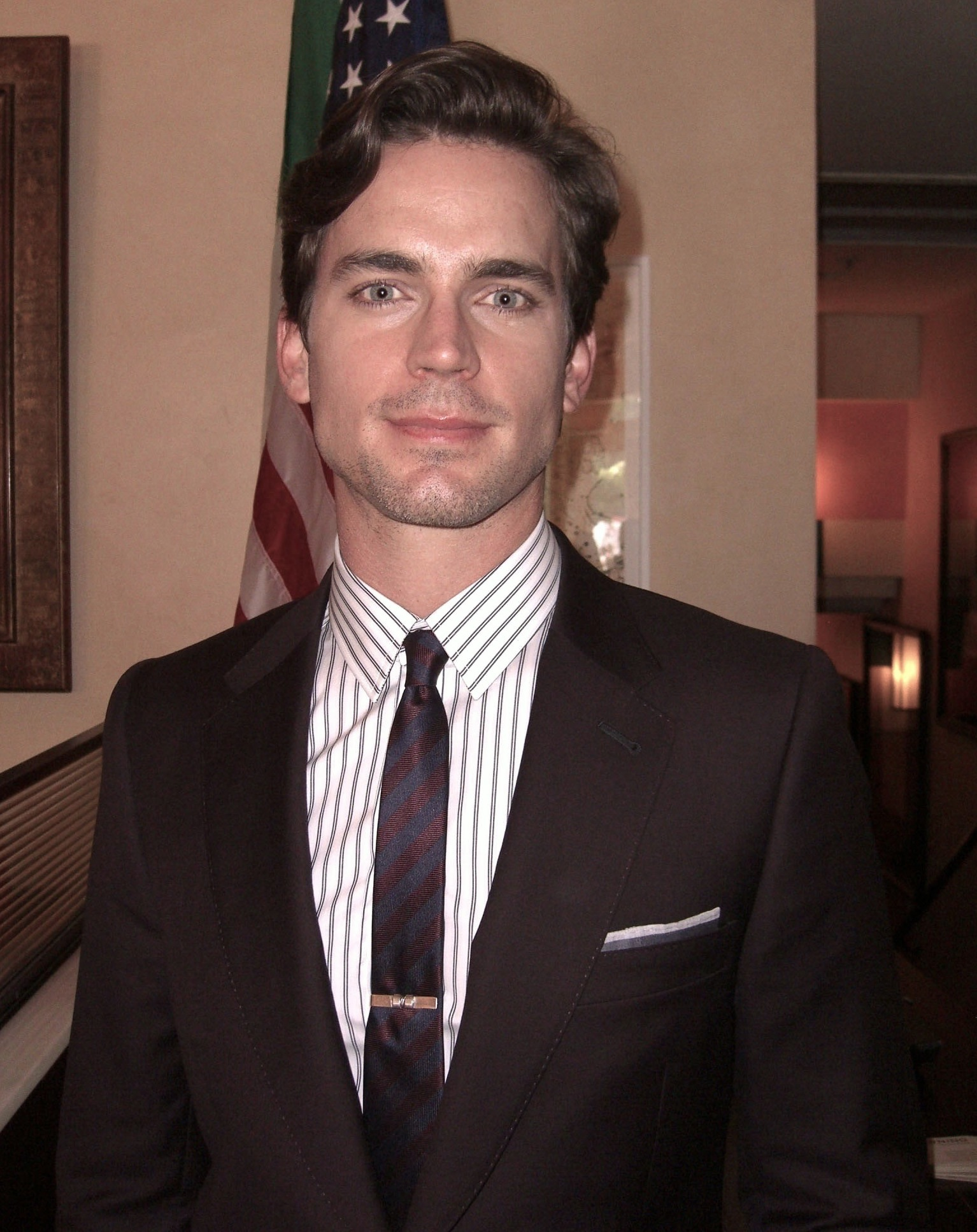
Bomer in 2011

For his next film, Bomer starred opposite Channing Tatum in Steven Soderbergh's comedy drama Magic Mike (2012). He studied with a group called Hollywood Men in Los Angeles to prepare for the role. The film premiered as the closing film at the Los Angeles Film Festival on June 24, 2012. Magic Mike was a critical and commercial success and Bomer's performance was praised. Bomer and Tatum were nominated for 'Best Musical Moment' at the 2013 MTV Movie & TV Awards.

Bomer made two appearances in 2013. The first was as a guest performer on the NBC sitcom The New Normal, portraying the role of Monty, the ex-boyfriend of the protagonist of the series, Bryan Collins, played by Andrew Rannells. The second was to voice Superman in the direct to video Superman: Unbound, based on the 2008 comic book story "Superman: Brainiac" by Geoff Johns. His voiceover earned him an invitation to the Behind the Voice Actors Awards in 2013.

In 2014, Bomer appeared in five projects. His first release of the year, Winter's Tale, was a romantic and supernatural fantasy drama, written and directed by Akiva Goldsman, and based on Mark Helprin's novel Winter's Tale. Bomer plays the young father of Colin Farrell's character. Winter's Tale received negative reviews. His second release of the year was in the black space fiction comedy Space Station 76 by Jack Plotnick, alongside Liv Tyler and Patrick Wilson. James Rocchi of The Wrap said; "all the performers are game" and the performance of Bomer; "as a melancholy engineer with a prosthetic hand that looks like a Nintendo Power Glove".

Bomer's next project involved Ryan Murphy casting him opposite Mark Ruffalo, Jim Parsons and Julia Roberts in the drama romance film The Normal Heart (2014). Based on Larry Kramer's play of the same name, it featured Bomer as a closeted writer of The New York Times and love interest of Ruffalo's character. The film shows the rise of the HIV-AIDS crisis in New York City between 1981 and 1984, as seen through the eyes of writer/activist Ned Weeks (Ruffalo), the founder of a prominent HIV advocacy group. The production of The Normal Heart stopped for a few months while he was on a diet. Bomer's performance was praised by a reviewer for The Hollywood Reporter, who considered his acting as the highlight of the production. Matthew Gilbert of The Boston Globe praised that Bomer is: "quite simply, devastating in this movie, his beauty adding resonance because it begins to fade so suddenly, as his cheeks protrude and lesions gather." Gilbert also lauded the chemistry between Bomer and Ruffalo saying that: "is among the movie's strengths, too, as it provides the core of love and compassion amid all the acrimony." Bomer received his first Golden Globe Award in the Best Supporting Actor category and his first Primetime Emmy Awards nomination.

After narrating the documentary Hunted: The War Against Gays in Russia, following LGBTQ people in Russia. later that year, Bomer was cast by Murphy in "Pink Cupcakes", an episode in the fourth season of American Horror Story. His participation was described by Lauren Piester of E! Online as "one of the show's most shocking moments". Bomer's first release of 2015 was Magic Mike XXL, a sequel to the popular 2012 film, again featuring Channing Tatum and Joe Manganiello. Magic Mike XXL grossed $122 million worldwide. Reviewing the film for Rolling Stone, Peter Travers noted that; "the movie is just a rambling, loosey-goosey road trip, with Bomer and Manganiello getting extra time to shine." He also sang two songs for the film's soundtrack: "Heaven" and "Untitled (How Does It Feel)". After Bomer's participation in American Horror Story: Freak Show; Murphy put him in the main cast of the fifth season, American Horror Story: Hotel. Bomer plays the son of Iris (Kathy Bates) and the lover of the Countess (Lady Gaga).

=== 2016–present: Professional expansion, independent films and Broadway ===
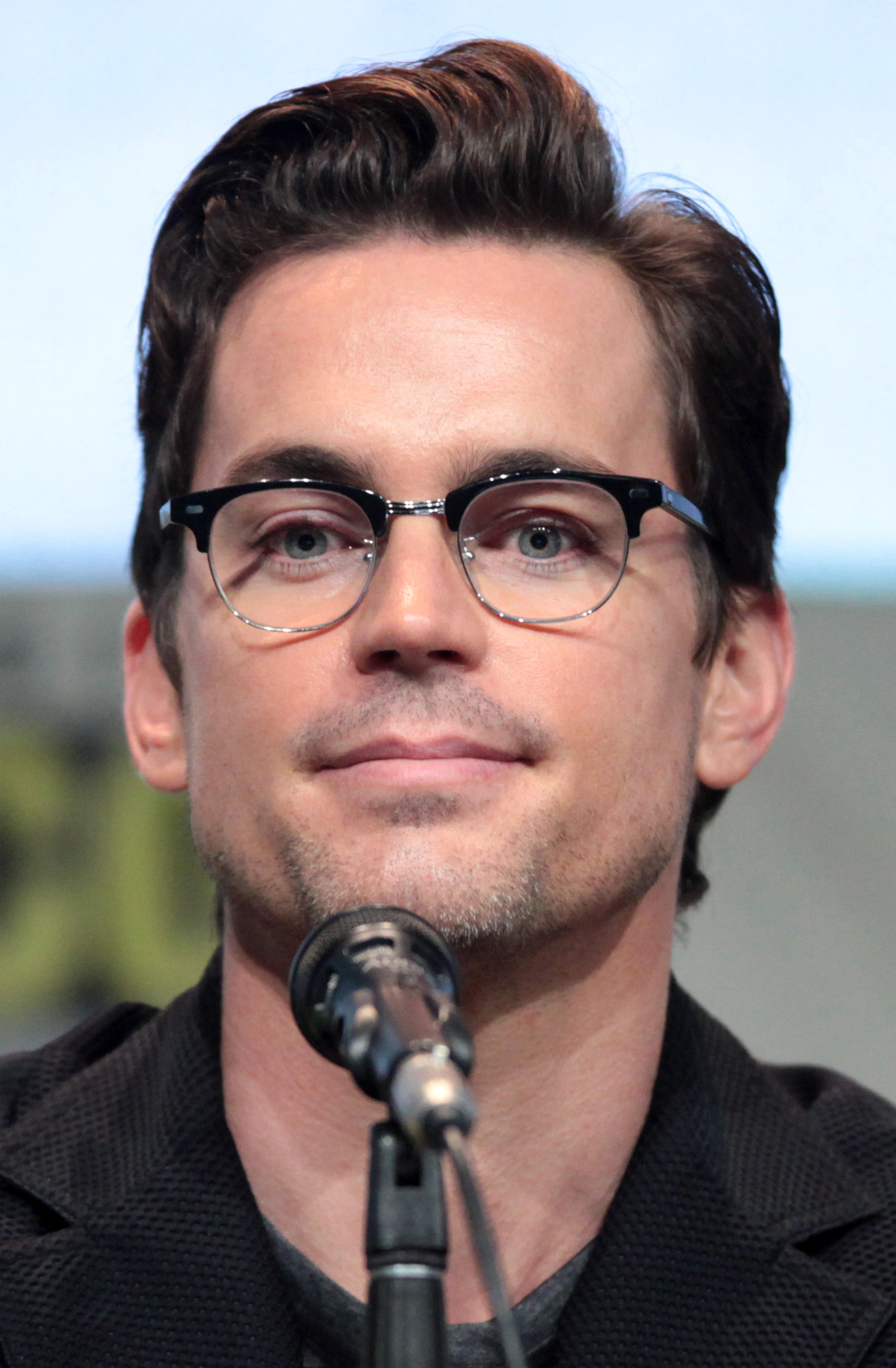
Bomer at the 2015 San Diego Comic-Con

Bomer appeared in two films in 2016. He played for the first time a villain in the movie The Nice Guys, as a psycho killer named John Boy. Directed by Shane Black, starring Ryan Gosling and Russell Crowe. Gosling and Bomer were at the film's premiere at the Cannes Film Festival in 2016. The Nice Guys generated positive reviews and enjoyed moderate box office success. His next role was as Matthew Cullen in Antoine Fuqua's Western action film The Magnificent Seven, playing the farmer husband of Haley Bennett's character. The film received mixed reviews from critics, although the cast and action sequences were praised, and grossed $162.4 million worldwide. He was cast as Monroe Stahr, the lead in Billy Ray's 2016 series The Last Tycoon, loosely based on the F. Scott Fitzgerald novel of the same name, along with actors Kelsey Grammer, Lily Collins, and Dominique McElligott. He also made a voice-only and uncredited appearance as a narrator of a crime docuseries in Roanoke. This marked his third appearance across the American Horror Story series.

In 2017, Bomer starred in Walking Out, a drama directed by Alex and Andrew Smith, portraying the estranged father of a 14-year-old son (played by Josh Wiggins). Bomer said he related to the character "in a profound way." The film screened in the U.S Dramatic Competition at the 2017 Sundance Film Festival and was released on October 6, 2017. Justin Chang of the Los Angeles Times praised Bomer's portrayal of a rugged mountain man, while David Ehrlich of IndieWire commended his performance against type, describing it as "commanding". The Village Voice included Bomer's performance among its 17 most overlooked performances of 2017.

Timothy McNeil's drama Anything marked Bomer's final film release of 2017 and McNeil making his feature directorial debut. Bomer was cast as Freda Von Rhenburg, a transgender sex worker who lives in Los Angeles and begins a relationship with her neighbor, Early Landry (played by John Carroll Lynch). Anything is based on McNeil's play of the same name. He has received some criticism from the transgender community for the casting of a cisgender man, to play a transgender woman. Jon Frosch of The Hollywood Reporter felt that Bomer: "gives a performance of real warmth and delicacy," saying that: "rather than play Freda as a force of nature or a collection of mannerisms—the typical default modes of actors playing trans women—Bomer renders her fully dimensional: an unpredictable tangle of impulses, by turns defensive and tender." Anything had its release at the Los Angeles Film Festival on June 17, 2017. Also in 2017, Bomer was a guest narrator at Disney's Candlelight Processional.

In 2018, Bomer began working on his directorial debut on the series The Assassination of Gianni Versace: American Crime Story. Written by Tom Rob Smith and starring Jon Jon Briones and Darren Criss, in the roles of father and son, respectively, the episode that Bomer directs is titled "Creator/Destroyer". The episode was watched by more than 1 million people. Bomer had other opportunities to direct before but always wanted to wait for the optimum chance to immerse himself in a project. He read 3,000 pages of books on directing. He found a part in a 2018 revival of the Mart Crowley play The Boys in the Band, which was staged at Booth Theatre and marked his Broadway debut. Directed by Joe Mantello, it tells the story a group of gay men who gather for a birthday party in New York City. Theater critic Michael Sommers noted that "Matt Bomer tends to fade in the glare of flashier personalities, but he lends the character a watchful quality as one of those deferential souls who is content to observe others." The play won a Tony Award for Best Revival of a Play. Bomer's first film in 2018 was Bill Oliver's science fiction film Jonathan. His role was that of a detective who appears in only one scene of the film. Jonathan had its world premiere at the Tribeca Film Festival on April 21, 2018.

Two of Bomer's films in 2018 premiered at the 43rd Toronto International Film Festival—the comedy-drama Papi Chulo and the drama Viper Club. In the former, Bomer plays Sean, a local network television weather forecaster. A reviewer for Screen Daily argued that Bomer is "terrific" and concluded that "while he may not yet have the name recognition to act as a key selling point for this film, it's the kind of performance which gets noticed". In Viper Club, Bomer played Sam, a journalist who helps Helen (played by Susan Sarandon), to save her son who was kidnapped by a group of terrorists. He had a guest starring role on the NBC series Will & Grace (2018–2019) and he also appeared as Negative Man in the DC Universe superhero series, Doom Patrol (2019).

In 2020, Bomer portrayed Jamie Burns on the USA Network anthology series The Sinner. In 2023, Bomer executive produced and portrayed Hawkins Fuller on the Showtime miniseries Fellow Travelers.

Bomer joined the cast of the Academy Award for Best Picture nominated film Maestro in March 2022 where he played the role of David Oppenheim and starred alongside Bradley Cooper and Carey Mulligan. On the shooting experience, Bomer said "Even though my part in 'Maestro' was smaller, Bradley (Cooper) was so collaborative with me from the get-go. It was such an immersive experience. It had (a profound impact). It was a way of working that I'm really grateful that I got to be exposed to."

In June 2024, it was announced that Max Mutchnick and David Kohan had created Mid-Century Modern, a Golden Girls–like TV series, with Bomer cast as a Betty White character type and Nathan Lane as a Bea Arthur character type. Linda Lavin played Lane's mother. The series was set in Palm Springs. The series cancellation was announced on 29 September 2025 following the first season.

In October 2025, Bomer co-starred in Jonah Hill's film Outcome, starring with Keanu Reeves, Hill, and Cameron Diaz. Filming started in the middle of March 2024. In October 2026, he will make his West End debut playing King Herod in Andrew Lloyd Webber’s Jesus Christ Superstar, at the Theatre Royal Drury Lane in London.

== Public image ==
Bomer has been noted for his looks and is regarded as a sex symbol. BuddyTV ranked him first on its list of "TV's Sexiest Men of 2011" and third in 2012. In June 2013, Bomer was ranked at no. 2 on Logo's Hot 100 list, which is based on the votes of readers of AfterEllen.com and theBacklot.com. Bomer was the list's highest-ranked man and second only to Jennifer Lawrence.

== Personal life ==
Bomer is an LGBT rights activist. He publicly came out as gay in 2012, when he thanked his partner and their children during an acceptance speech for his Steve Chase Humanitarian Award. Also in 2012, Bomer was given an Inspiration Award for his work at the GLSEN Awards.

Bomer married publicist Simon Halls in 2011; the marriage became public through the media in 2014. In an interview discussing his marriage, Bomer said that his marriage to Halls was a very small event in New York City: "It was very chill and very small—just our closest and dear ones. There is a security, a validity. It's just a feeling, I think—something about saying vows in front of the people around you who love and support you. I think it was good for our family." The couple has three children through surrogacy, one born in 2005 and twins born in 2008.

Bomer has been practicing Transcendental Meditation since his early 20s; in 2013 he spoke of his support for the work of the David Lynch Foundation.

In 2018, Bomer campaigned for Democratic candidate Beto O'Rourke in the U.S. Senate election in Texas.

== Acting credits and awards ==
According to the review aggregation website Rotten Tomatoes and box-office website The Numbers, Bomer's most critically and commercially successful films include Flightplan (2005), In Time (2011), Magic Mike (2012), Superman: Unbound (2013), The Normal Heart (2014), Magic Mike XXL (2015), The Magnificent Seven (2016), The Nice Guys (2016) and Walking Out (2017). Among his stage roles, he has appeared in a Broadway revival of The Boys in the Band (2018).

Bomer won a Golden Globe Award for Best Supporting Actor – Series, Miniseries or Television Film in 2015, a nomination for the Primetime Emmy Award for Outstanding Supporting Actor in a Limited Series or Movie in 2014, and a Critics' Choice Television Award for Best Supporting Actor in a Movie/Miniseries in 2014.

It was announced on August 4, 2025, that Bomer would be receiving an Artistic Impact Award from the Geffen Playhouse.
