= Our Son =

2023 film by Bill Oliver

- Release poster
- Directed by: Bill Oliver
- Written by: Peter Nickowitz; Bill Oliver
- Produced by: Fernando Loureiro; Eric Binns; Guilherme Coelh; Jennifer 8. Lee; Christopher Lin
- Starring: Luke Evans; Billy Porter
- Cinematography: Luca Fantini
- Edited by: Zach Clark; Tyler Jensen
- Music by: Ola Fløttum
- Production company: Tigresa
- Distributed by: Vertical
- Release dates: June 10, 2023 (Tribeca); December 8, 2023
- Running time: 104 minutes
- Country: United States
- Language: English

Our Son is a 2023 American drama film directed by Bill Oliver, from a screenplay by Oliver and Peter Nickowitz. It stars Billy Porter, Luke Evans, Robin Weigert, Andrew Rannells, Isaac Cole Powell and Phylicia Rashad.

It had its world premiere at the 2023 Tribeca Festival on June 10, 2023, and was released by Vertical on December 8, 2023.

== Cast ==
- Luke Evans as Nicky
- Billy Porter as Gabriel
- Christopher Woodley as Owen
- Andrew Rannells as Matthew
- Robin Weigert as Pam
- Kate Burton as Maggie 'Miggie'
- Phylicia Rashad as Maya
- Isaac Cole Powell as Solo
- Michael Countryman as Jim 'Grumps'
- David Pittu as Ian
- Cassandra Freeman as Adele
- Gabby Beans as Judith
- Liza J. Bennett as Claire
- Nuala Cleary as Isabella
- Francis Jue as Jason
- Alfredo Narciso as Lorenzo
- Emily Donahoe as Alexandra

== Production ==
In June 2022, it was reported that Billy Porter and Luke Evans joined the cast of the film, with Bill Oliver directing from a screenplay he wrote alongside Peter Nickowitz. In August 2022, Robin Weigert, Andrew Rannells, Isaac Cole Powell, Phylicia Rashad, and Kate Burton joined the cast of the film.

== Release ==
Our Son had its world premiere at the 2023 Tribeca Festival on June 10, 2023. It was then released by Vertical Entertainment on December 8, 2023.

== Reception ==
On the review aggregator website Rotten Tomatoes, 86% of 22 critics' reviews are positive, with an average rating of 6.4/10. Metacritic, which uses a weighted average, assigned the film a score of 58 out of 100, based on 6 critics, indicating "mixed or average" reviews.
