= Pride Icons =

Non-fungible token project

Pride Icons is a NFT collection created by Israeli art director Max Bahman in Miami in June 2022 for Pride Month. This NFT project claims to be the world's largest collection of LGBTQ-inspired NFTs.

The NFT collection claims to have raised over $1 million by selling 100 NFTs of LGBT icons, created in the images of Lady Gaga, Cher, Ru Paul, Eliad Cohen and Elton Ilirjani. The project has donated to queer and trans non-profit organizations like the Trevor Project, GLAAD and GLSEN.
