= Hunted: The War Against Gays in Russia =

2014 documentary film

Hunted: The War Against Gays in Russia (originally released by BBC Worldwide and Channel 4 in the United Kingdom under the title Cold Fear: Gay Life In Russia) is a 2014 HBO documentary film by Ben Steele on anti-gay violence in Russia. It is narrated by Matt Bomer.

The documentary film was originally shown in the United Kingdom at the time of the 2014 Winter Olympics in Sochi, Russia. In the lead-up to the Games, many Western nations criticised Russia's stance on LGBT (lesbian, gay, bisexual and transgender) rights, in particular the anti-"gay propaganda" law which passed in June 2013, with some calling for a boycott of the Olympic Games. At this time, violent attacks on gay men by extremist groups such as Occupy Pedophilia, which was profiled in Steele's documentary, reached their height. These abuses included online humiliation and beatings on camera (sometimes to the point of unconsciousness), with these videos being uploaded online in order to humiliate the victim. Radio Free Europe/Radio Liberty, a United States government-funded media organisation, noted that "the brutality of these videos played a significant role in galvanizing broad international support for Russia's beleaguered LGBT community".

== See also ==
- LGBT rights protests surrounding the 2014 Winter Olympics
