= Fellow Travelers (miniseries) =

2023 historical miniseries

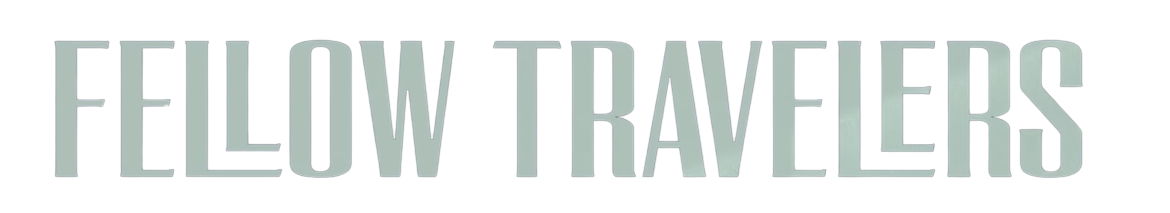
- Genre: Historical romance; Political thriller
- Created by: Ron Nyswaner
- Based on: Fellow Travelers by Thomas Mallon
- Starring: Matt Bomer; Jonathan Bailey; Jelani Alladin; Linus Roache; Noah J. Ricketts; Allison Williams
- Composer: Paul Leonard-Morgan
- Country of origin: United States
- Original language: English
- No. of episodes: 8

Production
- Executive producers: Matt Bomer; Daniel Minahan; Ron Nyswaner; Robbie Rogers; Dee Johnson
- Producer: Anya Leta
- Cinematography: Simon Dennis; Ronald Plante
- Editors: Christopher Donaldson; Wendy Hallam Martin
- Running time: 55-67 minutes
- Production companies: Blue Days Films; Off-Season Productions; Fremantle; Showtime Networks

Original release
- Network: Showtime
- Release: October 29 – December 17, 2023

Fellow Travelers is an American historical romance and political thriller television miniseries based on the 2007 novel of the same name by Thomas Mallon. Starring Matt Bomer and Jonathan Bailey, it centers on the decades-long romance between two men who first meet during the height of McCarthyism in the 1950s. The series premiered on October 29, 2023, on Showtime following an October 27 release on Paramount+ with Showtime.

The series received positive reviews from critics with particular praise for the performances of Bomer and Bailey. It was named among the best television shows of 2023 by several publications and was a recipient of numerous accolades including a Peabody Award and three nominations at the 76th Primetime Emmy Awards.

== Premise ==
After a chance encounter in Washington, D.C., in the 1950s, Hawkins Fuller and Timothy Laughlin start a volatile romance that spans "the Vietnam War protests of the 1960s, the drug-fueled disco hedonism of the 1970s and the AIDS crisis of the 1980s, while facing obstacles in the world and in themselves".

== Cast ==
=== Main ===
- Matt Bomer as Hawkins "Hawk" Fuller, a World War II veteran and official at the State Department who vigilantly hides his homosexuality
- Jonathan Bailey as Timothy "Tim" Laughlin, a young and idealistic congressional staffer who becomes entangled with Hawkins
- Jelani Alladin as Marcus Gaines, a gay reporter chafing at the unofficial segregation of 1950s Washington, D.C.
- Linus Roache as Senator Wesley Smith, a father figure to Hawkins and opponent of McCarthyism (based in part on Lester C. Hunt)
- Noah J. Ricketts as Frankie Hines, a self-assured drag queen and love interest of Marcus
- Allison Williams as Lucy Smith, daughter of Senator Smith, childhood friend and eventual wife of Hawkins

=== Supporting ===
- Will Brill as Roy Cohn
- Chris Bauer as Senator Joseph McCarthy
- Matt Visser as David Schine
- Christine Horne as Jean Kerr, aide to Senator McCarthy and later his wife
- Erin Neufer as Mary Johnson, a closeted secretary in Hawkins' office and friend of Tim
- Keara Graves as Miss Addison, a secretary in Hawkins' office who is a true believer in McCarthyism
- Chelsea Russell as Stormé, an entertainer at the Cozy Corner
- Andy Milne as Andre, the pianist at the Cozy Corner
- David Tomlinson as Eddie Kofler, a young government employee whom Hawkins sleeps with and later turns in to investigators
- Jane Moffat as Helen Smith, wife of Senator Smith
- Mike Taylor as Leonard Smith, son of Senator Smith and brother of Lucy
- Rosemary Dunsmore as Estelle, Hawkins' mother
- Michael Therriault as Fred Treband, an investigator working to purge homosexual employees from the U.S. government
- Jude Wilson as Jerome, a San Francisco youth taken in by Marcus and Frankie
- Brittany Raymond and Teagan Sellers as the adult and teenage Kimberly, daughter of Hawkins and Lucy
- Etienne Kellici as Jackson, son of Hawkins and Lucy
- Morgan Lever as Craig, Hawkins’ "boy toy" on Fire Island

== Episodes ==
No.	Title	Directed by	Teleplay by	Original release date (Note: Every episode was released two days earlier on Paramount+ with Showtime.)
1	"You're Wonderful"	Daniel Minahan	Ron Nyswaner	October 29, 2023
In 1980s Washington D.C., Hawkins "Hawk" Fuller and his wife Lucy celebrate his new diplomatic post in Milan by hosting a party at their mansion. Marcus, an old friend, unexpectedly visits to deliver him a souvenir and news that his old friend, Tim, is dying. In 1952, upon Dwight D. Eisenhower winning the presidential election, Hawk meets and flirts with Tim Laughlin, who strongly believes in McCarthyism and is a devout Catholic. Hawk arranges Tim a job for Joseph McCarthy as an aide to find information for him, and later seduces Tim. There are increasing crackdowns on secret homosexuals and communists at work, which worries Hawk. Hawk is also under pressure to marry Senator Smith's daughter Lucy, who he grew up with. Tim lets Hawk know of the information he overhears, but asks to be invited to a party in return; Hawk obliges. At the party, Tim is introduced to Marcus, a reporter who also hides his sexuality. Tim, Marcus, and Hawk visit an underground gay bar, where Hawk and Tim can openly kiss. Tim expresses jealousy over Hawk's relationship with Lucy, and Hawk reminds him they cannot catch feelings for one another. Tim storms off in rage. Tim attends mass, which he had stopped attending upon his relationship with Hawk. A priest tells Tim that God will forgive him and make him pure if he is truly sorry, but Tim confesses he felt pure while having sex with Hawk. McCarthy enforces harder crackdowns on homosexuals and communists, confirming Tim's insider information. Hawk returns to Tim and apologizes, confessing that he left his first lover out of fear, and that he later died; Tim and Hawk rekindle their relationship. Back in the present, Hawk is preparing to visit Tim; Lucy, who knows of their relationship, pressures him not to go. Now in San Francisco near where Tim lives, Hawk calls him, only for Tim to cut the call, though the phone eventually rings back.
2	"Bulletproof"	Daniel Minahan	Dee Johnson	November 5, 2023
In 1986, Hawk meets up with Maggie, Tim's sister, who criticises Hawk for depriving Tim of the opportunity to have a real partner. In 1953, Hawk attends Senator Smith's birthday party. Lucy's brother, Leonard, implies that he knows of Hawk's homosexuality and that Hawk is only courting Lucy to obtain Senator Smith's inheritance. That same night, Tim brings Hawk's secretary, Mary Johnson, to a party. He has a conversation with Senator McCarthy and Roy Cohn. Later, after they have sex at Hawk's apartment, Hawk reveals to Tim that Mary is a lesbian, and that she and Tim should keep seeing each other to protect themselves. Tim almost blows Hawk's facade when he oversleeps at Hawk's apartment. In a meeting, McLeod emphasises the growing threat of homosexuals in the M unit, causing Mary and Hawk to feign concern. Marcus and his friends discuss the black poet Langston Hughes, who is facing Cohn and McCarthy in court. In the hearing, David Schine, Cohn and McCarthy accuse Hughes of communist behaviour. Cohn shuts down Marcus's question about why Schine is not in Korea. Hawk learns that his father is dying. His mother suggests he makes amends with him as he disapproves of Hawk's homosexuality. Tim has lunch with Mary in public and later attends a party at Mary's house. He meets her friends, including her partner Caroline. Frankie, a drag queen, flirts with Marcus. Hawk visits his family home. His father demands that Hawk apologises for his homosexuality, which Hawk refuses to do, despite knowing he will be written out of his father's inheritance. Tim reveals information to Marcus about the authenticity of Schine's limp in exchange for Hawk's whereabouts. Caroline is placed under investigation by the authorities, leading them to conduct an investigation of her living arrangement with Mary. In his apartment, Hawk dictates a letter for Tim to write to Mary under the pretence of her love, to deflect suspicion from her. Hawk calls Tim out for dangerously mingling with Mary's queer friends, upsetting Tim who realises Hawk is using him. Mary uses the letter to clear her name and betrays Caroline to the authorities. Marcus finds Robert F. Kennedy, encouraging him to investigate Schine's 4F classification. Hawk tells Senator Smith that he is on McCarthy's enemy list. Frankie praises Marcus for his article about Langston Hughes. In the present, Hawk visits Tim in his apartment and stays for dinner.
3	"Hit Me"	Destiny Ekaragha	Teleplay by : Brandon K. Hines & Jack Solomon; Story by : Ron Nyswaner	November 12, 2023
In 1986, a bitter Tim admits to Hawk that he has Karposi's sarcoma and has a limited time remaining to live, deeply unsettling Hawk. In 1953, Hawk and Tim attempt a relationship beyond stolen moments and start by taking time at the shore. Hawk has an ulterior motive as he is tracking a soldier who may have important information about David Schine's military deferral. While Hawk investigates, Tim experiments with cruising and expresses his anger at Hawk for "abandoning" him. Frankie pursues and ultimately convinces Marcus to take their relationship to the next level, though Frankie is considerably more relaxed about his sexuality than Marcus. One night at a club where Frankie is performing, a racist bouncer refuses to let Marcus enter and they both end up in the street due to racial and sexual discrimination. In the heat of the moment, Marcus denies his sexuality and Frankie. Roy Cohn continues to try to keep David Schine from being drafted, and it is suggested he is secretly gay, despite leading the Lavender Scare investigation. After reconciling, Hawk and Tim go on a dinner date at the shore since they are away from Washington, but he overdrinks and embarasses Hawk as he realizes he cannot express public affection like straight couples. Later in bed, Hawk tells of his service during World War II. Hawk learns Sen McCarthy, despite a quick marriage of convenience, may also be gay and have committed sexual assult on the soldier.
4	"Your Nuts Roasting on an Open Fire"	James Kent	Anya Leta	November 19, 2023
McCarthy and Cohn's reign of terror continues; it's implied that a government employee commits suicide rather than be publicly exposed due to their findings. In 1986, Hawk reunites with Marcus and Frankie, as well as meeting Jerome, a young man whom they have informally adopted. Their circle of friends watch Roy Cohn deny he has AIDS on television. Back in 1953, Schine is drafted into the Army, though Cohn demands numerous concessions for him to "protect" him. This and Roy's threats toward the Army bring unwelcome attention on McCarthy which Tim witnesses. Marcus encourages Hawk to get tested for AIDS. Hawk's formerly impenitrable facade weakens as he is anonymously betrayed and called to face an interview and later a polygraph test about his sex life by McCarthy's investigation. With great resolve, he passes the test because as he later recounts to Marcus, he was not ashamed of his love for Tim. Hawk learns that his personal assistant betrayed him to the investigation and confronts her. Marcus makes peace with his attraction to Frankie. 1986, Hawk feels regret over his years of duplicity toward Lucy as well as the unraveling of his relationship with Tim. Tim recruits Hawk to help his AIDS activist group. After initially refusing, and after Tim has a seizure while Hawk's blowing off steam at a leather bar, he reconsiders to make it up to Tim.
5	"Promise You Won't Write"	James Kent	Katie Rose Rogers & Robbie Rogers	November 26, 2023
In 1954, Roy Cohn's obsession with David Schine leads to the televised Army-McCarthy hearings. Schine rejects and abandons Cohn in disgust. Tim acts as a secret spy passing on information to Hawk. Senator McCarthy, Cohn, and Schine are discredited and disgraced. Hawk continues to hide his secret life from Lucy. When Senator Smith's son Lenny is revealed as homosexual, Hawk tries to protect Smith, but he commits suicide to avoid compromising his ethics. Hawk comforts Lucy and asks her to marry him (as well as protect himself); Tim is devastated and joins the armed forces to try to forget Hawk.
6	"Beyond Measure"	Uta Briesewitz	Dee Johnson	December 3, 2023
In 1986 San Francisco, Hawk and Tim continue to have an uneasy reunion. In 1968 Washington DC, Hawk and Lucy are settled in life with two children, rebellious Jackson and sweet Kimberly. Tim, on his way to becoming a priest, is arrested after he and his Catholic colleagues burn Vietnam War draft cards as conscientious objectors. Hawk shelters Tim in his hunting cabin near the Fullers' vacation home while he is laying low to avoid arrest. Tim resists but ultimately falls for Hawk's charms again and they resume their affair. Marcus and Frankie have moved to San Francisco where Marcus cares for his aged father and struggles with his internal homophobia and inability to be honest with his father. Frankie becomes involved with the Peace movement and later becomes a counselor for girls. During a weekend party that the Fullers host, Jackson hides in the hunting cabin and meets Tim, whom he takes a liking to, especially compared to Hawk's authoritarian approach. Tim guides Hawk to better connect with Jackson. Lucy and Kimberly also inadvertedly learn of Tim, angering Lucy. Feeling neglected, Lucy has a sexual indescretion with a guest at the party which Hawks notes and spurs him to ravish her out of jealousy. Lucy chastises Hawk for risking their family's position for outlaw Tim, but before he can act, Tim gives himself up for arrest.
7	"White Nights"	Destiny Ekaragha	Brandon K. Hines & Ron Nyswaner	December 10, 2023
In 1979, Harvey Milk is murdered which agitates the gay community in San Francisco. Hawk reaches out to Tim from Fire Island, the gay resort mecca. After learning from Lucy that Hawk has been missing for months, he travels to see him where he finds Hawk spiraling in drugs and hedonism with his "boy toy"/drug dealer Craig and others. Initially judgemental, Tim succumbs to partying with Hawk, but eventually comforts him as he expresses his grief over son Jackson's death from heroin three years earlier. Back in San Francisco, Marcus is a teacher who struggles hiding his sexuality at school which creates tension with Frankie. Marcus is also called out by a homeless gay student, Jerome. When Dan White, Harvey Milk's killer is only convicted of manslaughter, San Francisco riots in protest and Frankie, Jerome, and eventually Marcus partake. After they are beaten, Marcus and Frankie reconcile; they take in Jerome who learns to appreciate the strengths of each. Tim is angered when Hawk resumes using drugs after his emotional breakthrough the previous night and returns to San Francisco where he attends a vigil for Harvey Milk. Hawk returns home to Lucy and Kimberly.
8	"Make It Easy"	Uta Briesewitz	Teleplay by : Anya Leta & Jack Solomon; Story by : Ron Nyswaner	December 17, 2023
In 1957, Hawk and Tim reunite at Senator McCarthy's funeral, where they resume their affair in Hawk's apartment. Lucy is pregnant with Jackson and the couple are making a life together, but she suspects Hawk's infidelity and subtly pressures him to end his affair. Initially, Hawk assists Tim in obtaining a government job helping refugees, but realizing they would often work together and considering Lucy, he sabotages Tim's security clearance which will prevent him from working in government in the future. Tim rushes to the hospital to confront Hawk just after Lucy has given birth, but he relents when he sees the child. In 1986 in San Francisco, Hawk seeks redemption by helping Tim to meet with the Governor on behalf of people with AIDS. While Hawk's AIDS test comes back negative, Jerome admits to Marcus that he has AIDS; Marcus comforts him. Lucy flies to San Francisco to meet Tim in the hospital, reflecting on her relationship as always "never enough" for Hawk. Later, she decides to part ways with Hawk permanently though she encourages him to stay with Tim until the end. Kimberly pieces together the story of her father's "friend." Hawk brings Tim to a gala for the Governor where they acknowledge each others' love. Using Hawk's security pass, Tim, Marcus, Frankie, Jerome, and others stage an AIDS protest at the gala. In 1987 with the support of Kimberly, Hawk visits the first showing of the AIDS Quilt panels in Washington, DC, including Tim's, where he admits to her his love for Tim at last.

== Production ==
=== Development ===
A television adaptation of Mallon's work was in development as a co-production from Fremantle for Showtime as of October 2021. Showtime officially greenlit the series in April 2022, with the series being written by Ron Nyswaner who also served as executive producer. Other executive producers included Daniel Minahan, who directed the first two episodes.

=== Casting ===
Alongside the greenlight announcement in April 2022, it was announced Matt Bomer would executive produce the series and star as Hawkins Fuller. Allison Williams joined the cast in June as Lucy Smith. It was announced in July that Jonathan Bailey would star opposite Bomer as Tim Laughlin.

=== Filming ===
Principal photography began in Toronto on July 27, 2022, and wrapped on December 9, 2022.

== Release ==
Episodes of the series were released on Paramount+ with Showtime two days prior to their debuts on Showtime.

== Reception ==
=== Critical response ===
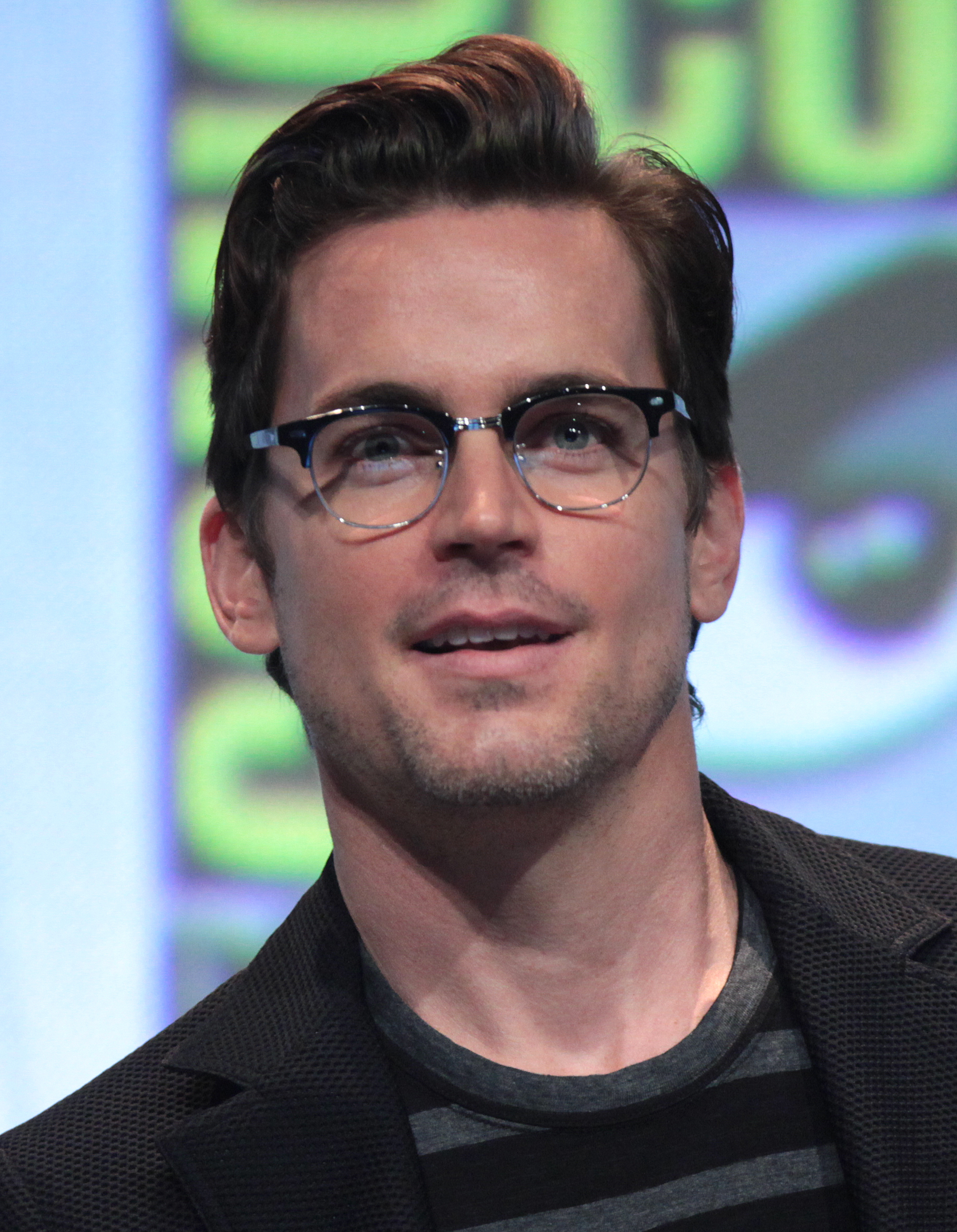
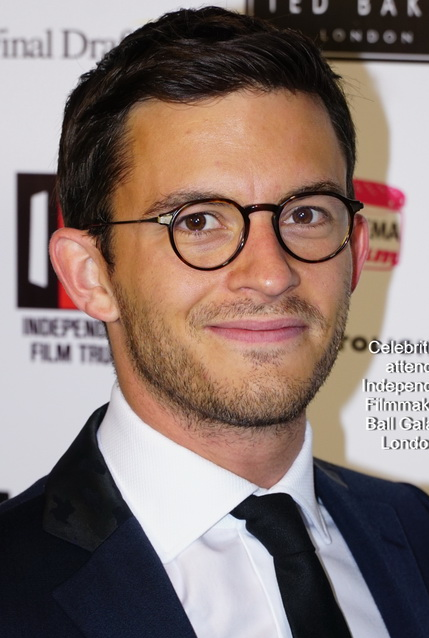
The performances of Matt Bomer (L) and Jonathan Bailey received widespread acclaim from critics

Fellow Travelers won a Peabody Award at the 83rd ceremony for chronicling LGBTQ+ history over 50 years. On the review aggregator website Rotten Tomatoes, 90% of 76 critics' reviews are positive, with an average rating of 8.4/10. The website's consensus reads: "A queer romance with the full breadth and depth of an epic, Fellow Travelers is a moving showcase for Matt Bomer and Jonathan Bailey's captivating on-screen chemistry." On Metacritic, the series has a weighted average score of 76 out of 100, based on 25 critics, indicating "generally favorable" reviews.

Fellow Travelers was named among the best TV shows of 2023 by Variety, The Washington Post and The New Yorker. The show was nominated for three awards at the 76th Emmy Awards, Lead Actor in a Limited Series (Bomer), Supporting Actor in a Limited Series (Bailey), and Outstanding Writing for a Limited Series.

=== Accolades ===
Year	Award	Category	Nominee(s)	Result	Ref.
2023	Golden Tomato Awards	Best Miniseries	Fellow Travelers	Won	
2024	Astra TV Awards	Best Limited Series	Fellow Travelers	Nominated	
2024	Astra TV Awards	Best Actor in a Limited Series or TV Movie	Matt Bomer	Nominated	
2024	Astra TV Awards	Best Supporting Actor in a Limited Series or TV Movie	Jonathan Bailey	Won	
2024	Astra TV Awards	Best Writing in a Limited Series or TV Movie	Ron Nyswaner (for "You're Wonderful")	Nominated	
2024	Black Reel Awards	Outstanding Supporting Performance in a TV Movie/Limited Series	Jelani Alladin	Nominated	
2024	Black Reel Awards	Outstanding Supporting Performance in a TV Movie/Limited Series	Noah J. Ricketts	Nominated	
2024	Black Reel Awards	Outstanding Writing in a TV Movie or Limited Series	Brandon K. Hines & Ron Nyswaner (for "White Nights")	Nominated	
2024	Critics' Choice Television Awards	Best Limited Series	Fellow Travelers	Nominated	
2024	Critics' Choice Television Awards	Best Actor in a Limited Series or Movie Made for Television	Matt Bomer	Nominated	
2024	Critics' Choice Television Awards	Best Supporting Actor in a Limited Series or Movie Made for Television	Jonathan Bailey	Won	
2024	GLAAD Media Awards	Outstanding Limited or Anthology Series	Fellow Travelers	Won	
2024	Golden Globe Awards	Best Limited or Anthology Series or Television Film	Fellow Travelers	Nominated	
2024	Golden Globe Awards	Best Actor in a Limited Series, Anthology Series, or a Motion Picture Made for Television	Matt Bomer	Nominated	
2024	Peabody Awards	Entertainment	Fellow Travelers	Won	
2024	People's Choice Awards	The TV Performance of the Year	Matt Bomer	Nominated	
2024	Primetime Emmy Awards	Outstanding Lead Actor in a Limited or Anthology Series or Movie	Matt Bomer	Nominated	
2024	Primetime Emmy Awards	Outstanding Supporting Actor in a Limited or Anthology Series or Movie	Jonathan Bailey (for "Make It Easy")	Nominated	
2024	Primetime Emmy Awards	Outstanding Writing for a Limited or Anthology Series or Movie	Ron Nyswaner (for "You're Wonderful")	Nominated	
2024	Satellite Awards	Best Miniseries & Limited Series or Motion Picture Made for Television	Fellow Travelers	Nominated	
2024	Satellite Awards	Best Actor in a Miniseries, Limited Series, or Motion Picture Made for Television	Matt Bomer	Nominated	
2024	Satellite Awards	Best Supporting Actor in a Miniseries, Limited Series, or Motion Picture Made for Television	Jonathan Bailey	Won	
2024	Screen Actors Guild Awards	Outstanding Performance by a Male Actor in a Miniseries or Television Movie	Matt Bomer	Nominated	
2024	Television Critics Association Awards	Outstanding Achievement in Movies, Miniseries and Specials	Fellow Travelers	Nominated	

== See also ==
- Fellow Travelers (opera)
