= Peter Nickowitz =

American dramatist

- Occupations: Poet, playwright, screenwriter
- Writing career
- Notable works: Cinema Vernacular; The Debutante; Lulu; Jonathan; The Alice Complex; Backgammon at the Louvre; Songs & Statues
- Website: www.peternickowitz.com

Peter Barr Nickowitz is an American poet, playwright, and screenwriter.

Nickowitz grew up in Fairfield, Connecticut and graduated from Brandeis University and New York University, where he received a Ph.D. in English and American literature.

He is the author of Rhetoric and Sexuality: The Poetry of Hart Crane, Elizabeth Bishop, and James Merrill (Palgrave, 2006).

Nickowitz's debut collection of poems, Cinema Vernacular, was released in 2014 by Publication Studio. For the Huffington Post, Carol Muske-Dukes writes: "Cinema Vernacular is built around a protagonist's ongoing everyday and romantic affairs in two cities: New York and Paris. The reader finds herself drawn into the poetry "movie," drawn into the fluid "camera work" of the "director's cut" — and then drawn past all these elements to the heart of the poem, the place where form, all form, becomes superfluous and the poem itself speaks unforgettably to the reader." In Goodreads.com Kevin Killian writes: "Cinema Vernacular is a stunning new collection of poetry by Peter Nickowitz. Using forms like screenplays and even films in his poetics, Cinema Vernacular is porous, deft, concerned with our relationship to the intangible and how desire filters through image and text. These poems mark, with recognizable pathos and sharp turns of hilarity, the arrival of a major voice."

His poems have appeared in literary magazines including The Paris Review, Barrow Street, Shampoo, Slope, Marsh Hawk Review, and Third Coast, and he was a National Poetry Series finalist.

His plays include The Alice Complex (with Kate Mara and Harriet Harris; Lisa Banes and Xanthe Elbrick) ("Smart, incisive..." - NY Times), Backgammon at the Louvre, and Songs & Statues. They have been produced at the Cherry Lane, Dixon Place, The Blank Theatre, and Stella Adler Studio, where he was the 2008-09 Harold Clurman Playwright-in-Residence.

His screenplays (co-written with Bill Oliver) include The Debutante, which received a grant from the Jerome Foundation, Lulu, a drama based on the life of silent film star Louise Brooks, which was optioned by Neve Campbell and Peer Oppenheim, and Jonathan, about a young man who has a condition in which he shares his body with another consciousness.

He has taught at the LaGuardia Community College of the City University of New York, the University of Southern California, and The New School. He currently teaches in the Goldberg Department of Dramatic Writing at New York University.
