= Walking Out =

2017 film

- Film poster
- Directed by: Alex & Andrew J. Smith
- Written by: Alex & Andrew J. Smith
- Story by: David Quammen
- Starring: Matt Bomer; Bill Pullman; Josh Wiggins
- Cinematography: Todd McMullen
- Edited by: Michael Taylor
- Music by: Ernst Reijseger
- Distributed by: IFC Films
- Release dates: January 21, 2017 (Sundance); October 6, 2017 (United States)
- Running time: 95 minutes
- Country: United States
- Language: English
- Box office: $162,521

Walking Out is a 2017 American survival drama film directed by Alex & Andrew J. Smith, starring Matt Bomer, and based on a short story of the same name by David Quammen. It was screened in the U.S. Dramatic Competition section of the 2017 Sundance Film Festival. It was executive produced by Rodrigo Garcia, and it was released on October 6, 2017 by IFC. It was filmed on location in Livingston, Paradise Valley, and Bozeman, Montana. The film received critical acclaim.

== Plot ==
Once a year, David flies to Montana from Texas while on school break to see his father Cal, an avid outdoorsman. David lives with his mother and is most used to suburban city life. At fourteen, he is firmly attached to his smartphone. He incessantly plays games and frequently texts his mom after leaving home.

Father and son are distant. David barely looks up from his phone when his dad arrives at the airport to pick him up. Neither seems excited to see the other, and Cal emphasizes that he wants David to participate in outdoor activities. He's stern with David, but they are restrained with each other. David would rather not go pheasant-hunting but agrees to go. Cal asks him if he'd like to go on a moose-hunting expedition in the snow-peaked mountains. David is reluctant but also feels obligated to make the trek.

High up in the mountains Cal is accidentally shot in the leg, and David must get them both out. He carries his father on his back down the mountain, aided for a while by his directions. He takes breaks to tend to him. Though David loses his way, he finds a remote house, where he and his father can receive care.

After a doctor arrives, he tells David that his father died, likely at some point the previous morning. David responds, "I know." He had continued to carry his father out.

== Cast ==
- Matt Bomer as Cal
  - Alex Neustaedter as Young Cal
- Bill Pullman as Clyde
- Josh Wiggins as David
- Lily Gladstone as Lila

== Critical reception ==
On review aggregator website Rotten Tomatoes, the film holds an approval rating of 90% based on 49 reviews, and an average rating of 7.1/10. The website's critical consensus reads, "Beautifully filmed and powerfully acted, Walking Out effectively balances tense father-son drama against an affecting wilderness survival story." On Metacritic, the film has a weighted average score of 79 out of 100, based on 13 critics, indicating "generally favorable reviews".
