= Jonathan (2018 film) =

- Theatrical release poster
- Directed by: Bill Oliver
- Written by: Peter Nickowitz; Bill Oliver; Gregory Davis
- Produced by: Randy Manis; Ricky Tollman
- Starring: Ansel Elgort; Suki Waterhouse; Patricia Clarkson
- Cinematography: Zach Kuperstein
- Edited by: Tomas Vengris
- Music by: Will Blair; Brooke Blair
- Production companies: Manis Film; Raised by Wolves
- Distributed by: Well Go USA
- Release dates: April 21, 2018 (Tribeca Film Festival); November 16, 2018 (United States)
- Running time: 95 minutes
- Country: United States
- Language: English
- Box office: $41,558

Jonathan, also known as Duplicate, is a 2018 American drama science fiction film directed by Bill Oliver and written by Gregory Davis, Peter Nickowitz and Oliver, starring Ansel Elgort.

It had its world premiere at the Tribeca Film Festival on April 21, 2018. It was released on November 16, 2018, by Well Go USA.

== Summary ==
The film explores the life of an individual with two identities; each functional for 12 hours each day. They communicate via recorded video messages. They are referred to as "brothers". They live in New York City. Jonathan is a draftsman for an architect. John is a clerk in a law firm. Each works part time and their circumstance is not known to the people they interact with. To sustain this life, they have agreed to follow a strict set of rules. Jonathan is more shy and reserved while John is more lively and outgoing. Jonathan is "active" from 7 am to 7 pm while John is "active" from 7 pm to 7 am. This results in John's personality being more nightlife-oriented. A doctor, Dr. Mina Nariman, has raised the abandoned Jonathan/John since birth and she has planted a device in their brain to allocate the day equally. She counsels each man separately.

John secretly starts dating a girl, Elena. Suspicious, Jonathan hires a detective to spy on his other half. The girlfriend is seen as a betrayal and causes Jonathan to become jealous and angry, ultimately telling Elena never to come back. John, furious, disappears and stops making videos for Jonathan.

Jonathan reaches out to Elena to attempt to amend his relationship with John, which he values dearly. However, over multiple meetings, in which Jonathan tells Elena about himself and John, Jonathan and Elena begin dating. Jonathan and John then ironically make up and begin making videos for each other again but Jonathan keeps his relationship with Elena a secret. Jonathan even has sex with Elena and tells John that he has lost his virginity but keeps his secret. Jonathan, feeling guilty, tells Dr. Nairman about Elena. Dr. Nariman, who has progressively revealed to the viewer her preference for John through dialogue with Jonathan, tells John about Elena. John ruins Jonathan's architecture job by sneaking into the office at night.

The conflict between the "brothers" grows. Jonathan wants to make amends with his other half but John descends into depression and anger, eventually repeatedly attempts to commit suicide. It is revealed that a third "brother" once existed but Dr. Nariman had him "removed" or killed. John demands to be removed and threatens to take Jonathan with him via suicide if Jonathan doesn't consent to his removal.

Abruptly, Dr. Nariman tells Jonathan that he is getting weaker while John, driven by his intense emotions and his fight with depression, is becoming stronger. John's "shifts" begin to become longer while Jonathan's shorten.

Jonathan accepts this fate. John takes a taxi to JFK, and on the way Jonathan orders the cab to stop on the side of the road, then "dies" on the beach, through a discussion with the cabbie, as the "shifts" become even shorter for Jonathan and eventually stop completely. John, with the sun in his face, returns to the cab and heads to JFK.

The movie ends without clarifying for the viewer whether Dr. Nariman had Jonathan "removed" or was telling the truth about the shortening shifts.

== Cast ==
- Ansel Elgort as Jonathan / John
- Patricia Clarkson as Dr. Mina Nariman
- Suki Waterhouse as Elena
- Matt Bomer as Ross Craine
- Douglas Hodge as Hans Lieber
- Joe Egender as Myles

== Production ==
In August 2016, it was announced Ansel Elgort had been cast in the film, with Bill Oliver directing from a screenplay he wrote, alongside Gregory Davis and Peter Nickowitz. Randy Manis and Ricky Tollman served as producers on the film, while Neal Dodson served as an executive producer. In September 2016, Patricia Clarkson and Suki Waterhouse joined the cast of the film.

== Release ==
The film had its world premiere at the Tribeca Film Festival on April 21, 2018. It also screened at the Los Angeles Film Festival on September 26, 2018. Shortly afterwards, Well Go USA acquired U.S. distribution rights to the film, and set it for a November 16, 2018, release. The film was released on Netflix streaming on January 15, 2019.

== Reception ==
Review aggregation website Rotten Tomatoes gives the film a 61% rating, based on 28 reviews. Metacritic gives a score of 62 out of 100, based on 12 critics, indicating "generally favorable" reviews.

Variety film critic, Dennis Harvey, is not sure what genre to place this offbeat dual personality film, but he states: "'Jonathan' is an intelligent absorbing tale that provides an impressive showcase for 'Baby Driver' star Ansel Elgort".
