= Anything (film) =

- Theatrical release poster
- Directed by: Timothy McNeil
- Written by: Timothy McNeil
- Produced by: Micah Hauptman; Ofrit Peres; Louise Runge
- Starring: John Carroll Lynch; Matt Bomer; Maura Tierney; Margot Bingham; Michael Boatman; Tanner Buchanan
- Cinematography: James Laxton
- Edited by: Geraud Brisson; Andy Keir
- Music by: Isley Reust
- Production companies: Chaotik; ONEZERO Films; Slendro Media
- Distributed by: Great Point Media
- Release dates: June 17, 2017 (LA Film Festival); May 11, 2018 (United States)
- Running time: 94 minutes
- Country: United States
- Language: English

Anything is a 2017 American romantic drama film directed and written by Timothy McNeil and starring John Carroll Lynch and Matt Bomer. The film is based on a play that the director had performed in December 2007 with the Elephant Theater Company in Los Angeles and that he also adapted for the film. It also stars Maura Tierney, Margot Bingham, Michael Boatman, Tanner Buchanan and Micah Hauptman in supporting roles.

The film was released at the LA Film Festival on June 17, 2017. It was released on May 11, 2018, by Great Point Media.

== Plot ==
Early Landry is a Mississippi widower reeling from the recent death of his wife. After a suicide attempt, he relocates to Los Angeles to be closer to his overprotective but well-intentioned sister, Laurette, and her family. He soon moves into an apartment of his own. In time, he is both equally intimidated and charmed by his Hollywood neighbors, especially Freda Von Rhenburg, a transgender sex worker. Before long, Early and Freda bond over their shared loneliness and past traumas, sparking a friendship and, eventually, a tentative romance.

== Cast ==
- John Carroll Lynch as Early Landry
- Matt Bomer as Freda Von Rhenburg
- Maura Tierney as Laurette Sachman
- Margot Bingham as Brianna
- Michael Boatman as Charles
- Tanner Buchanan as Jack Sachman
- Micah Hauptman as David

== Release ==
The film had its premiere at the Los Angeles Film Festival on June 17, 2017.

== Reception ==
=== Critical response ===
On the review aggregator website Rotten Tomatoes, 67% of 24 critics' reviews are positive, with an average rating of 6.2/10. In Metacritic, the film has a rating of 60 out of 100, based on 10 reviews, indicating "mixed or average" reviews.

== Awards and nominations ==
| Year | Organization | Recipients | Award | Result | Ref. |
|---|---|---|---|---|---|
| 2017 | Los Angeles Film Festival | John Carroll Lynch | Special Mention for Acting | Won | |
| 2018 | FilmOut San Diego | Timothy McNeil | Best Narrative Feature | Won | |
| 2018 | FilmOut San Diego | Timothy McNeil | Best Screenplay | Won | |
| 2018 | FilmOut San Diego | Timothy McNeil | Best Direction | Won | |
| 2018 | FilmOut San Diego | Timothy McNeil | Best Narrative Feature – Audience Award | Won | |
| 2018 | FilmOut San Diego | John Carroll Lynch | Best Actor in a Feature Film | Won | |
| 2018 | FilmOut San Diego | Matt Bomer | Best Actor in Supporting Role | Won | |
| 2018 | FilmOut San Diego | Maura Tierney | Best Actress in Supporting Role | Won | |
