= Eliad Cohen =

Israeli actor, model and entrepreneur

- אליעד כהן
- Born: May 11, 1988 (age 38); Acre, Israel
- Occupations: Model, Director of PR for PAPA PARTY
- Known for: Model, actor, event producer
- Modeling information
- Height: 6 ft 0 in (1.83 m)
- Hair color: Brown
- Eye color: Dark brown

Instagram information
- Page: eliad_cohen
- Followers: 1.4 million

Eliad Cohen (Hebrew: אליעד כהן; born May 11, 1988) is an Israeli producer, actor, model and entrepreneur. He is the co-founder of Gay-ville, a gay-friendly vacation rental service headquartered in Tel Aviv. He became a prominent Israeli gay personality after being chosen as the cover model of the Spartacus International Gay Guide for the 2011-2012 issue, which led to various magazine covers around the world.

After completing his military service, Eliad Cohen began a modeling career, later branching into organizing of events, most notably Arisa and PAPA series, promotion of Tel Aviv Pride events and various activities in support of gay-friendly Israeli tourism. He also established a prominent online service through his own Gay-ville website.

Cohen is also a fashion designer of men's swimwear and footwear, hosting a runway show of his spring/summer 2023 looks at Miami Swim Week 2022.

== Career ==
Eliad is well known for his role as the presenter of the Arisa party series, which is the first international party dedicated to Mizrahi music, the music of Jews from Arabic speaking countries. Eliad was approached by the Arisa creative team and asked to star in one of their music videos. The Arisa videos have proved very popular and have an international following online. But they have also drawn criticism for their depiction of various themes and characters. In November 2011, the Arisa party line traveled to São Paulo, Brazil where Eliad and the rest of the Arisa team were featured in front of an audience of nearly 1,000 people.

He is the co-founder of Gay-ville (aka G-ville), a gay-friendly, global vacation and apartment rental network based out of Tel Aviv. Gay-ville took off with thousands of apartment listings in countries on every continent.

Cohen is also founder of the PAPA Party that was launched in Tel Aviv in association with Tel Aviv Gay Pride. Since 2012, he has launched it internationally with events in various American, Canadian, European and Latin American venues.

Spartacus International Gay Guides featured Cohen on the cover of the guide's 2011-2012 issue. In February 2013, Out magazine readers voted him as second in its "Top 10: Eligible Bachelors". His appearance on the cover of Spanish gay publication OhMyGod created controversy when Spanish photographer Juan Pablo Santamaria depicted Eliad Cohen under the provocative title "Eliad Cohen: El nuevo mesías gay de Israel" ("The new gay messiah of Israel"). In December 2011, he appeared on the cover of the Brazilian magazine Junior and in April 2016, on the cover of The Fight LGBT magazine. He also modelled for BCNÜ utility wear.

Cohen is a fashion designer who launched his line of menswear at Miami Swim Week 2022, as part of the official closing party.

In 2022, he also co-launched a "Pride Icons" NFT project in Miami which is the world's largest collection of LGBTQ-inspired NFT art. The project has pledged $1 million to queer organizations including GLAAD, which monitors how LGBTQ people are portrayed in the media, and The Trevor Project, which offers crisis support for LGBTQ youth.

Cohen was interviewed by Dazed magazine for Pride Month 2022 on how he uses his social media platform for gay pride. He said: “We need to be visible for the world to know that we are here, and we are here to stay.”

== Personal life ==
Eliad was born on May 11, 1988, in Acre, Israel. After completing high school, he served in the Israel Defense Forces in an elite combat unit for three years.

After completing his army service, Eliad moved to Tel Aviv where he worked as a bartender in various bars and clubs before launching his career.

He also ventured into modelling and posed for a number of advertisements. He always wears the chai, as a sign of pride in Israel. Cohen is openly gay after coming out to his parents when he was twenty years old.
