= Captain Aardvark =

Fictional character in the novel Catch-22

Captain "Aarfy" Aardvark is a fictional character, a major antagonist in the 1961 novel Catch-22 by Joseph Heller. Aarfy is the plump navigator in Yossarian's B-25, noted for being oblivious to incoming flak, getting lost on missions, and his omnipresent pipe. His nickname "Aarfy" is an abbreviation of his surname, Aardvark.

== Character sketch ==
=== Motivation ===
Aarfy is a social climber looking to work his way up into high society.

=== Goal(s) ===
Aarfy befriends Nately because Nately's father is rich, and he hopes to work for him after the war.

Aarfy perceives himself as moral and protects well-connected women from the sexual advances of other officers, looking for any possibility of self-advance within society. "Old Aarfy has never paid for it", he often says in reference to prostitutes. He often and openly commits rape, and says he can tell which girl is "nice and clean" and which is not.

=== Relationships and conflict(s) ===
Yossarian is constantly infuriated by Aarfy during missions, who appears to have no fear of flak and always gets in Yossarian's way when he is trying to get back to the escape hatch, away from the bombardier position in the nose.

Aarfy tries to be friends with Nately, in the hope that his father will give Aarfy an important job after the war for this service. Nately realizes that Aarfy is a "climber," though, and sees the other officers more as his friends.

Aarfy helps to protect women with social connections from the sexual advances of the other officers, much to their dismay, hoping that these connections will later be of use. Unlike the other officers, Aarfy is not willing to pay for sex with a prostitute, but perversely he has no regrets when he rapes and murders the innocent maid Michaela; when asked by Yossarian why he did not simply hire a prostitute, he repeats his common admonition that "Old Aarfy has never paid for it", and shows no remorse.

=== Epiphany ===
When Yossarian starts to convince Aarfy that he will have to pay for the rape and murder of Michaela, for the first time in the novel he loses his composure and shows fear. His fear is not realized, though, as when the police arrive, they instead arrest Yossarian for going AWOL and not Aarfy. His reprehensible actions are therefore vindicated and he can be satisfied that the system is there to protect him.

== Biographical summary ==
=== Actions in Catch-22 ===
==== On mission ====
During dangerous missions Yossarian always shouts at Aarfy to get out of the way so he can get to the escape hatch. Aarfy always replies that he can not hear him, infuriating Yossarian even more, and no matter how loud Yossarian shouts, Aarfy never can hear him (except when he says "never mind"). On one mission Yossarian gets so upset he punches Aarfy, but to no effect as his body fat absorbs all the blows. Yossarian's frustration with Aarfy is never vented and he always gives up, leaving Aarfy to carry on regardless.

He nearly gets himself and his comrades killed several times while getting lost on mission:

- Over Ferrara, when Yossarian went round a second time to bomb the bridge and Kraft and his plane's crew were killed.
- On a milk run to Parma, where Aarfy led the planes over the city of Livorno and Yossarian got hit in the leg by flak.
- With Colonel Cathcart, where the plane almost got shot down.

Aarfy is so heedless of his own personal safety and the well-being of others that it always astounds him when they become angry at him.

==== Social climbing ====
Aarfy throughout the novel tries to befriend Nately, as a means of getting in favor with his wealthy father:

"he had already fallen truly in love with Nately's father and the prospect of working for him after the war in some executive capacity as a reward for befriending Nately."

The irony is that Nately actually sees his friends as Yossarian, Orr, Hungry Joe, and Dunbar whom his parents would not be impressed with, but equally his parents would not like Aarfy whom they would see as a “climber”.

The girls upstairs and the cameo woman – protects them from the sexual advances of the officers, not for his own pleasure, but because he sees them as women connected to important men who could help him out after the war.

==== Fraternity life ====
Aarfy views women as purely a means to an end, whether it is for sex or for social connections. He advises Nately that if he wants to keep his prostitute in the apartment in Rome one night, then pay for them to stay till after curfew and then they will be obliged to stay and do what ever they want. He gives an example when he has done this before in his fraternity days:

“I remember one day we tricked two dumb high-school girls from town into the fraternity house and made them put out for all the fellows there who wanted them by threatening to call up their parents and say they were putting out for us. We kept them trapped in bed for more than ten hours. We even smacked their faces a little when they started to complain. Then we took away their nickels and dimes and chewing gum and threw them out.”

==== Michaela ====
Toward the end of the novel, Aarfy rapes and murders a maid, Michaela, while on leave in Rome. This inadvertently forms the emotional center of the novel. When an aghast Yossarian tells him that he will be arrested and possibly executed, Aarfy laughs dismissively that no one would do that to "good old Aarfy":

"But I only raped her once!" he explained.
Yossarian was aghast. "But you killed her, Aarfy! You killed her!"
"Oh, I had to do that after I had raped her," Aarfy replied in his most condescending manner. "I couldn't very well let her go around saying bad things about us, could I?"
"But why did you have to touch her at all, you dumb bastard?" Yossarian shouted. "Why couldn't you get yourself a girl off the street if you wanted one? The city is full of prostitutes."
"Oh, no, not me," Aarfy bragged. "I never paid for it in my life."

His insouciant view is vindicated when the police arriving on the scene show no interest in Aarfy and instead arrest Yossarian for going AWOL.

== Major themes ==
=== Catch-22 ===
Yossarian's frustration with Aarfy during missions is analogous to his frustration with "Catch-22," whereby no matter how loud he shouts or hard he fights he can not affect Aarfy, who carries on regardless. Similarly one can not fight "Catch-22."

Aarfy's character exemplifies the perversity of a society and culture governed by Catch-22s that ultimately serve to protect the powerful. Other, more considerate members of the squadron suffer ignominious or horrible fates while he—merely oblivious and inconsiderate for most of the novel—faces no negative consequences even when his self-absorption drives him to murder. In his reactions to flak, and to rape and murder, Aarfy demonstrates complete insanity. Hence he survives and prospers in a completely insane world.

== Portrayals ==
In Mike Nichols' 1970 film adaptation of the novel, Aarfy is played by Charles Grodin. In the 2019 Hulu miniseries, he is played by Rafi Gavron.
