= Catch-22 (miniseries) =

2019 satirical TV series

- Genre: Satire; Dark comedy; Comedy drama; War
- Based on: Catch-22 by Joseph Heller
- Developed by: Luke Davies; David Michôd
- Written by: Luke Davies; David Michôd
- Directed by: Grant Heslov; George Clooney; Ellen Kuras
- Starring: Christopher Abbott; Kyle Chandler; Daniel David Stewart; Rafi Gavron; Graham Patrick Martin; Lewis Pullman; Austin Stowell; Pico Alexander; Jon Rudnitsky; Gerran Howell; Hugh Laurie; George Clooney; Giancarlo Giannini
- Composers: Harry Gregson-Williams; Rupert Gregson-Williams
- Countries of origin: United States; Italy
- Original language: English
- No. of episodes: 6

Production
- Executive producers: George Clooney; Grant Heslov; Richard Brown; Steve Golin; Luke Davies; David Michôd
- Producer: Barbara A. Hall
- Cinematography: Martin Ruhe
- Editors: Tanya Swerling; Michael Ruscio
- Running time: 41–46 minutes
- Production companies: Lakeside Ultraviolet; Yoki Inc.; Smokehouse Pictures; Anonymous Content; Paramount Television

Original release
- Network: Hulu (United States); Sky Atlantic (Italy)
- Release: May 17, 2019

Catch-22 is a satirical black comedy television miniseries based on the 1961 novel of the same name by Joseph Heller. It premiered on May 17, 2019, on Hulu in the United States. The series stars Christopher Abbott, Kyle Chandler, Hugh Laurie, and George Clooney, who is also an executive producer alongside Grant Heslov, Luke Davies, David Michôd, Richard Brown, Steve Golin, and Ellen Kuras. The series was written by Davies and Michôd and directed by Clooney, Heslov, and Kuras, with each directing two episodes.

== Premise ==
Captain John Yossarian (Christopher Abbott) is a United States Army Air Forces bombardier in World War II, furious that thousands of people are trying to kill him and that his own army keeps increasing the number of missions he must fly. He is trapped by the bureaucratic rule Catch-22, which considers a request to be relieved of duty on the grounds of insanity to be the process of a rational mind, as flying dangerous missions with a high fatality rate is in fact insane, so any such request must be denied.

Yossarian chose to be assigned as a bombardier, hoping the war would finish before his lengthy training was completed but now sits exposed in the nose of a B-25 Mitchell, dropping bombs on Italian territory occupied by enemies who are trying to kill him. He has tried to avoid flying by feigning illness, sabotaging his intercom, poisoning everyone at the base or clandestinely moving the bomb line so it appears their target has already been captured.

The events occur in the Mediterranean theatre of World War II while the fictional 256th US Army Air Squadron is based on the island of Pianosa, in the Mediterranean Sea, and conducting bombing raids over heavily defended fascist controlled Italy.

== Cast and characters ==
=== Starring ===
- Christopher Abbott as Capt. John Yossarian
- Kyle Chandler as Colonel Cathcart
- Daniel David Stewart as Milo Minderbinder
- Rafi Gavron as Aarfy Aardvark
- Graham Patrick Martin as Ivor Orr
- Lewis Pullman as Major Major Major Major
- Austin Stowell as Nately
- Pico Alexander as Clevinger
- Jon Rudnitsky as McWatt
- Gerran Howell as Kid Sampson
- Hugh Laurie as Major de Coverley
- George Clooney as Major (later Colonel and eventually Brigadier General) Scheisskopf
- Giancarlo Giannini as Marcello

=== Also starring ===
- Grant Heslov as Doc Daneeka
- Kevin J. O'Connor as Lt. Colonel Korn
- Julie Ann Emery as Marion Scheisskopf
- Tessa Ferrer as Nurse Duckett
- Jay Paulson as The Chaplain
- Josh Bolt as Dunbar
- Ian Toner as Peele
- Freddie Watkins as Mudd
- Valentina Bellè as Clara
- Joe Massingill as James Marsh
- Shai Matheson as Schultz
- Nick Moss as a military police captain
- Anthony Skordi as Caliph of Oran
- Massimo Wertmüller as Alessandro
- Nicola Goodchild as an administrative clerk
- Martyn Ellis as the governor-general of Malta
- David McSavage as a military investigator
- Harrison Osterfield as Snowden
- Peter Guinness as General Dreedle

== Episodes ==
No.	Title	Directed by	Teleplay by	Original release date
1	"Episode 1"	Grant Heslov	Luke Davies & David Michôd	May 17, 2019
In training, Yossarian and his unit are chewed out for their inability to march properly and punished by Major Scheisskopf. Yossarian says the point of parades are to make the majors feel powerful and the soldiers humiliated. He goes to the doctor to try and get out of the parade. He is denied. Yossarian also secretly sleeps with Major Scheisskopf's wife. Now in the European theater, Yossarian has flown 16 out of 25 bombing runs and doesn't want to do any more. Milo Minderbinder bribes Major de Coverley at camp with lamb chops to become the Mess Officer in charge of transport. The new commander, Colonel Cathcart, ups the number of bombing runs required to 30. Yossarian goes to the doctor to get grounded for being crazy, but the doctor explains the catch-22, everyone who flies more missions is crazy, so anyone who asks to be grounded is therefore sane and must fly. Yossarian watches a friend die on his next bombing run.
2	"Episode 2"	Ellen Kuras	Luke Davies & David Michôd	May 17, 2019
Sgt. Major Major is mistaken for an actual major and added to command meetings. Instead of admitting their mistake, Cathcart promotes him to Major. Milo takes over the Mess and expands his food sale and transport business, looping in Cathcart to take part of the profits. Cathcart yells at the men for missing a target, that was actually The Vatican in neutral territory, and raises the mission requirement to 35. Yossarian asks Major Major to read his command manual to learn about his new power to get him out of flying. Major agrees, but immediately stops reading when Yossarian leaves. Yossarian checks into the hospital to wait for Major to help him, but gets thrown out for fighting with a talkative patient. The flight team are given rest time in Rome, where the men visit a whore house. The combat mission requirement is increased to 40. Yossarian argues with his friend, Clevinger, who says it's their duty to support the infantry with air cover. Yossarian says that its the duty of the Army Air Force, not them specifically. On the next bombing mission, things appear to go well, but Clevinger's plane disappears. He and his crew are declared missing in action.
3	"Episode 3"	Ellen Kuras	Luke Davies & David Michôd	May 17, 2019
Yossarian tries to get out of invading Bologna by poisoning the camp's soup, believing another air unit will have to do the raid. The poisoning works and the raid is canceled, but the other unit does not attack. Yossarian goes to Maj. Major to see what he's found in the manual. He admits he hasn't read any of it. Yossarian then moves the bomb line on the map, making it look like Bologna has already been captured. The mission is canceled. Major de Coverley, thinking Bologna is now allied territory, travels there to requisition space and is captured by the Nazis. Cathcart raises the mission requirement to 50 and says he will drop it to 45 if the person who moved the line confesses. Milo arrives on base with donated German planes saying they are now part of the Syndicate (his business M&M). Cathcart signs off on it. In the bombing of Bologna, Yossarian destroys his intercom and forces his crew to turn back. At dinner, the crew is shamed. The next day, pilot McWatt practices dive bombs and accidentally kills Sampson. McWatt can not handle this. He turns off his engines and crashes his plane, killing himself.
4	"Episode 4"	George Clooney	Luke Davies & David Michôd	May 17, 2019
Yossarian concocts a plan to get discharged: fly all his required missions extremely fast before command has a chance to raise the requirement. He then rapidly flies 11 missions in 6 days and presents all his paper work at one time. Yossarian then accompanies Milo on business. They fly to Sicily to do a deal in goats, Palermo, where Milo's trading has led him to be elected Mayor, and a fancy diner in Malta, where Milo is being honored. Milo then has Yossarian pretend to be American tycoon, Nelson Rockefeller, to get a deal done in Algeria. When Yossarian returns to base, Korn informs him that the mission requirement was raised to 55 before his paper work was processed, and therefore he must fly more missions. Nately tells Yossarian he is going to ask prostitute Clara to marry him. Yossarian says this is stupid, but then backs down saying it’s great. On the bombing mission, poor communication causes Yossarian to not release his bombs and the other planes to miss. Fed up, Yossarian demands they try again. This time he hits the target and destroys the bridge. In the aftermath of success, the plane is hit and Nately is killed.
5	"Episode 5"	Grant Heslov	Luke Davies & David Michôd	May 17, 2019
Cathcart wants to punish Yossarian, but it would suggest the mission went wrong, when it was successful, so they decide to give Yossarian a medal and promote him to Captain. Yossarian is denied leave to tell Clara of Nately's death, but goes anyway. In Rome, he finds Clara's sister who only speaks Italian. He tries to explain and shows her Nately's wedding ring. She thinks that he must be asking for sex, but she says she has never done it and suggests just using her hand. Yossarian says she misunderstands and gives her the ring. At the same time, Aarfy rapes and kills a girl. MPs arrive, but not to arrest Aarfy. They arrest Yossarian for abandoning his post. In jail, Cathcart makes a deal to discharge Yossarian if he keeps quiet. Yossarian is released just in time, as a German air bombing, planned by Milo and Cathcart for profit, hits. Milo tells Yossarian he's his best friend. Scheisskopf arrives at the base. He learns of Yossarian’s dismissal and stops it. On the next bombing run, Yossarian is shot in the testicles and the plane goes down. All crew escape by parachute, except Orr who remains flying the plane.
6	"Episode 6"	George Clooney	Luke Davies & David Michôd	May 17, 2019
After parachuting out of a crashing plane, Yossarian hides from army patrol in an idyllic Italian village. When the army finds him, he is taken back to base. Doc Daneeka says that if he had lost at least one testicle he would be discharged, but the shrapnel missed. Yossarian goes to Cathcart, who wants to dismiss him, but cannot because of Scheisskopf. Yossarian gets Doc to say his wounds require a discharge, but Scheisskopf forces Yossarian to take off his pants and denies him. In the next bombing run, Yossarian greets a new kid, Snowden, and tells him to not sit in the tail, where Nately died. They are hit and Snowden dies in Yossarian's arms. At base, Yossarian strips out of his bloody clothes and walks around naked, remaining nude even days later, including at a medal ceremony. Scheisskopf says he will be punished, but the visiting General says it's not his business whether Yossarian is nude as he's the one getting the medal. Milo again offers Yossarian a job, even mentioning that the missing Orr is still alive, but he just walks away. A new recruit arrives, and is off put by Yossarian's nudity. Yossarian hugs him, then shepherds him through a bombing run, all in the nude.

== Production ==
=== Development ===
Around 2014, producer Richard Brown, writer Luke Davies and writer-director David Michôd discussed properties that they would like to tackle in limited series format similar to True Detective, which Brown had just executive produced. Davies brought up Heller's novel, which the trio agreed would benefit from a longer treatment than the two hours of Mike Nichols' 1970 feature film. The screen rights to the novel were held by Paramount Television where Anonymous Content had a deal. Davies and Michôd co-wrote the adaptation, which Brown developed at Anonymous. Michôd was originally set to direct until he became unavailable as a long-gestating feature film of his moved forward in production. The producers asked George Clooney to direct. He, along with his producing partner and frequent collaborator Grant Heslov, came on board as directors and executive producers.

On November 16, 2017, the production was announced. On January 12, 2018, it was announced that Hulu was in negotiations for the series and two days later it was confirmed that the production had been given a six episode order. On March 16, 2018, it was announced that Ellen Kuras was joining Clooney and Heslov in directing. They each directed two episodes, and Kuras also served as an executive producer. On May 7, 2018, it was announced that Italy's Sky Italia was joining the production as a co-producer.

=== Casting ===
Alongside the series order announcement, it was reported that in addition to directing the series George Clooney had been cast in the role of Colonel Cathcart. On March 9, 2018, it was announced that Christopher Abbott had been cast in the lead role of John Yossarian. On April 3, 2018, it was announced that Hugh Laurie had joined the main cast in the role of Major de Coverley. On April 13, 2018, it was announced that Clooney would no longer be playing the role of Colonel Cathcart and would instead assume the smaller supporting role of Major (later Colonel and eventually General) Scheisskopf. It was simultaneously announced that Kyle Chandler would be replacing him in the role of Cathcart. On May 3, 2018, it was reported that Daniel David Stewart, Austin Stowell, Rafi Gavron, Graham Patrick Martin, Pico Alexander, Jon Rudnitsky, Gerran Howell, and Lewis Pullman had joined the supporting cast as members of the "Merry Band." A few days later, it was announced that Tessa Ferrer and Jay Paulson had been cast as Nurse Duckett and The Chaplain, respectively. Towards the end of the month, it was reported that Giancarlo Giannini had been cast in the role of Marcello. On June 13, 2018, it was announced that Harrison Osterfield had been cast in the role of Snowden. On July 9, 2018, it was reported that Julie Ann Emery had been cast in the recurring role of Marion Scheisskopf.

=== Filming ===
Principal photography was scheduled to commence at the end of May 2018 in Sardinia and Viterbo in Italy. On July 10, 2018, George Clooney was struck by a car while riding a motorcycle to the set of the series. He was taken to a hospital in Olbia where he was released later that same day. Filming for the series concluded on September 4, 2018, in Santa Teresa Gallura, Italy. The series was directed by Clooney, Heslov, and Kuras, who worked simultaneously as scenes were shot out of sequence across all six episodes, a practice known as "cross-boarding", while Martin Ruhe served as cinematographer.

=== Aircraft ===
Four original aircraft were sourced for the filming of the miniseries: two North American B-25 Mitchell medium bombers, a Douglas C-47 Skytrain military transport, and a Junkers Ju 52 transport.

- B-25J Mitchell – 44-30423 (N3675G) "Photo Fanny," manufactured in the United States by North American Aviation. Sourced from Planes of Fame Museum in Chino, California, USA. Portrayed in the miniseries as the fictional "Fly Me High!"
- B-25J Mitchell – 45-8898 (N898BW) "Axis Nightmare," manufactured in the United States by North American Aviation. Sourced from Tri-State Warbird Museum in Batavia, Ohio, USA.
- C-47A Skytrain – 42-100884 (TS423/N147DC) "Mayfly," manufactured by Douglas Aircraft Company in the United States. Sourced from Aces High in North Weald, England.
- Ju 52/3m – T.2B-212 (F-AZJU), manufactured by Junkers in Germany. Sourced from Jean-Baptiste Salis, in La Ferte-Alais, France.

By comparison, the 1970 film adaptation of Catch-22 featured 18 original B-25 Mitchells. Seventeen were in flying condition and one non-flyable example was destroyed in the filming of the crash landing scene. Fifteen of the 18 bombers used in that film remain intact to this day.

== Release ==
The series premiered on May 17, 2019. In the United Kingdom, the series aired on Channel 4. In France, it aired on Canal+. In Australia, it was streamed on Stan. In Canada, it was streamed on Citytv Now.

== Reception ==
=== Critical response ===
At the review aggregator website Rotten Tomatoes, the series holds an approval rating of 84% based on 90 reviews, with an average rating of 7.2/10. The website's critical consensus states, "Though not quite as sharp as Joseph Heller's seminal novel, Catch-22's handsomely rendered, hilariously horrifying exploration of war still soars thanks to its stellar cast and reverent adherence to its source material." On Metacritic, it has a weighted average score of 70 out of 100, based on 34 critics, indicating "generally favorable reviews".

=== Accolades ===
Ceremony	Category	Recipient(s)	Result	Ref.
American Society of Cinematographers Awards	Outstanding Achievement in Cinematography in Motion Picture, Miniseries or Pilot Made for Television	Martin Ruhe (for "Episode 5")	Nominated	
Art Directors Guild Awards	Television Movie or Limited Series	David Gropman	Nominated	
Critics' Choice Television Awards	Best Limited Series	Catch-22	Nominated	
Critics' Choice Television Awards	Best Actor in a Limited Series or Television Movie	Christopher Abbott	Nominated	
Critics' Choice Television Awards	Best Supporting Actor in a Limited Series or Television Movie	George Clooney	Nominated	
Golden Globe Awards	Best Limited Series or Television Film	Catch-22	Nominated	
Golden Globe Awards	Best Actor in a Limited Series or Television Film	Christopher Abbott	Nominated	
Primetime Creative Arts Emmy Awards	Outstanding Sound Editing for a Limited Series, Movie or Special	Jerry Ross, Doug Mountain, Byron Wilson, Chris Assells, Jeff Fuller, Michael Alexander, Clayton Weber, Catherine Harper, and Catherine Rose (for "Episode 1")	Nominated	
Primetime Creative Arts Emmy Awards	Outstanding Special Visual Effects in a Supporting Role	Matt Kasmir, Brian Connor, Dan Charbit, Matthew Wheelon Hunt, Alun Cummins, Gavin Harrison, Giovanni Casadei, Remi Martin, and Peter Farkas (for "Episode 4")	Nominated	

== See also ==
- List of original programs distributed by Hulu
