= Chaplain Tappman =

Fictional character

Chaplain Captain Albert Taylor Tappman (A.T. Tappman) (usually referred to as "the Chaplain") is a fictional character in Joseph Heller's 1961 novel Catch-22 and its 1994 sequel Closing Time. In earlier editions he was called Chaplain Robert Oliver Shipman, but this was changed to Albert Taylor Tappman. Editions published in some other territories, notably Britain, have continued to use the original name. Heller named the character after Charles Allan Tapman, a Penn State University boxer and Class of 1938 graduate that Heller met socially in the early 1950s.

== Character overview ==
He is a naïve Anabaptist minister from Kenosha, Wisconsin, who is tormented throughout the novel by his atheist assistant, Corporal Whitcomb. While easily intimidated by the cruelty of others, the chaplain is a kind, gentle and sensitive man who worries constantly about his wife and children at home. He is the only character in the book Yossarian truly trusts, and the novel opens with:

It was love at first sight. The first time Yossarian saw the chaplain he fell madly in love with him.

He is timid and shy, and only through his friendship with Yossarian does he feel comfortable. In particular he enjoys the company of Yossarian and his friends at the staff club, until he is thrown out by Colonel Cathcart after General Dreedle is embarrassed by him.

Also of note is that the Chaplain and Yossarian have the first characteristic Heller-like circular dialogue in the novel, on page 13:

"You're a chaplain," he exclaimed ecstatically. "I didn't know you were a chaplain."
"Why, yes," the chaplain answered. "Didn't you know I was a chaplain?"
"Why, no. I didn't know you were a chaplain."

== Name versions ==
In the original version of the book, Chaplain Tappman was called "Robert Oliver Shipman". In the late spring of 1962, a man who shared Shipman's name and other personal characteristics threatened a lawsuit. Heller had never met the real Shipman and was initially concerned that changing the character's name could confuse readers. Nevertheless, the author agreed to change the name to "Albert Taylor Tappman" beginning with the sixth Simon & Schuster printing, the fall 1962 Dell paperback edition, and later printings of Jonathan Cape's British first edition. In the 1970 film, the character is identified as "Chaplain Tappman" and is apparently embarrassed by the unfortunate rhyme. British editions by Transworld retain the name "R.O. Shipman".

== C.I.D. investigation ==
The C.I.D. investigators that have been dispatched to the squadron are convinced that the Chaplain has been intercepting Major Major Major Major's mail and signing documents Washington Irving or Irving Washington. Yossarian has been abusing his duty of censoring letters sent home by the enlisted men, and signing those names to the letters he vandalises, except once where he signs "I yearn for you tragically. A. T. Tappman, Chaplain, U.S. Army". (Note that Yossarian's duties involve censoring enlisted men's letters; the chaplain is an officer.) This vandalism brings the C.I.D. down to the base.

Later on, Major Major Major Major begins signing those names to official documents, after he discovers that when he does, he never sees them again. Before they would always return with more attached documents to deal with.

These suspected acts of protest result in the Chaplain being interrogated at length by the C.I.D. investigators in the final chapters of the book. They find him guilty of all his "crimes"; since they're his crimes, he must have committed them; they also find him guilty of all the charges against him that they haven't thought of yet. Then they release him. This is actually worse than being jailed, because he never knows when he will be grabbed again.

When Yossarian tells the Chaplain that someone came into his hospital room to torment him with the words "We've got your pal!" the Chaplain replies. "Well, I'm your pal and they've certainly got me." At the end of the novel, all Yossarian's other friends are dead, missing, or, like Doc Daneeka, reduced to bureaucratic zombies. Only the Chaplain remains, and he has definitely been got (although in the last paragraphs he announces his intent to "stay here and persevere"). At the end of the play version, buoyed by Yossarian's escape, he happily writes home to his wife that he has punched Colonel Cathcart in the nose, is cheerfully awaiting his trial and following consequences, and that they think he is crazy.

== Film ==
Chaplain Tappman was portrayed by Anthony Perkins in the 1970 film adaptation of the novel directed by Mike Nichols.

Chaplain Tappman was portrayed by Jay Paulson in the 2019 miniseries directed by George Clooney, Grant Heslov, and Ellen Kuras.
