= Catch-22 (logic) =

Situation in which one cannot avoid a problem because of contradictory constraints

A flowchart showing Joseph Heller's original catch-22

A catch-22 is a paradoxical situation from which an individual cannot escape because of contradictory rules or limitations. The term was first used by Joseph Heller in his 1961 novel Catch-22.

Catch-22s often result from rules, regulations, or procedures that an individual is subject to, but has no control over, because to fight the rule is to accept it. Another example is a situation in which someone is in need of something that can only be had by not being in need of it (e.g., the only way to qualify for a loan is to prove to the bank that you do not need a loan). One connotation of the term is that the creators of the "catch-22" situation have created arbitrary rules in order to justify and conceal their own abuse of power.

== Origin and meaning ==
Joseph Heller coined the term in his 1961 novel Catch-22, which describes absurd bureaucratic constraints on soldiers in World War II. The term is introduced by the character Doc Daneeka, an army surgeon who invokes "Catch-22" to explain why any pilot requesting mental evaluation for insanity—hoping to be found not sane enough to fly and thereby escape dangerous missions—demonstrates his own sanity in creating the request and thus cannot be declared insane. This phrase also means a dilemma or difficult circumstance from which there is no escape because of mutually conflicting or dependent conditions.

"You mean there's a catch?"

"Sure there's a catch," Doc Daneeka replied. "Catch-22. Anyone who wants to get out of combat duty isn't really crazy."

There was only one catch and that was Catch-22, which specified that a concern for one's own safety in the face of dangers that were real and immediate was the process of a rational mind. Orr was crazy and could be grounded. All he had to do was ask; and as soon as he did, he would no longer be crazy and would have to fly more missions. Orr would be crazy to fly more missions and sane if he didn't, but if he was sane, he had to fly them. If he flew them, he was crazy and didn't have to; but if he didn't want to, he was sane and had to. Yossarian was moved very deeply by the absolute simplicity of this clause of Catch-22 and let out a respectful whistle.

Different formulations of "Catch-22" appear in the novel. The term is applied to loopholes and quirks of the military system, always with the implication that rules are inaccessible to and slanted against those lower in the hierarchy. In chapter 6, Yossarian is told that Catch-22 requires him to do anything his commanding officer tells him to do, regardless of whether these orders contradict orders from the officer's superiors.

In a final episode, Catch-22 is described to Yossarian by an old woman recounting an act of violence by soldiers,

"Catch-22 says they have a right to do anything we can't stop them from doing."

"What the hell are you talking about?" Yossarian shouted at her in bewildered, furious protest. "How did you know it was Catch-22? Who the hell told you it was Catch-22?"

"The soldiers with the hard white hats and clubs. The girls were crying. 'Did we do anything wrong?' they said. The men said no and pushed them away out the door with the ends of their clubs. 'Then why are you chasing us out?' the girls said. 'Catch-22,' the men said. All they kept saying was 'Catch-22, Catch-22.' What does it mean, Catch-22? What is Catch-22?"

"Didn't they show it to you?" Yossarian demanded, stamping about in anger and distress. "Didn't you even make them read it?"

"They don't have to show us Catch-22," the old woman answered. "The law says they don't have to."

"What law says they don't have to?"

"Catch-22."

According to literature professor Ian Gregson, the old woman's narrative defines "Catch-22" more directly as the "brutal operation of power", stripping away the "bogus sophistication" of the earlier scenarios.

=== Other appearances in the novel ===
Besides referring to an unsolvable logical dilemma, Catch-22 is invoked to explain or justify the military bureaucracy. In the first chapter, it requires Yossarian to sign his name to letters he censors while he is confined to a hospital bed. One clause mentioned in chapter 10 closes a loophole in promotions, which one private had been exploiting to re-attain the attractive rank of private first class after any promotion. Through courts-martial for going AWOL, he would be busted back to private but Catch-22 limited the number of times he could do this before being sent to the stockade.

At another point in the book, a prostitute explains to Yossarian that she cannot marry him because he is crazy, and she will never marry a crazy man. She considers any man crazy who would marry a woman who is not a virgin. This closed logic loop clearly illustrated Catch-22 because by her logic, all men who refuse to marry her are sane and thus she would consider marriage; but as soon as a man agrees to marry her, he becomes crazy for wanting to marry a non-virgin, and is instantly rejected.

Captain Black attempts to press Milo into depriving Major Major of food as a consequence of not signing a loyalty oath that Major Major was never given an opportunity to sign in the first place. Captain Black asks Milo, "You're not against Catch-22, are you?"

In chapter 40, Catch-22 forces Colonels Korn and Cathcart to promote Yossarian to Major and ground him rather than simply sending him home. They fear that if they do not, others will refuse to fly, just as Yossarian did.

=== Significance of the number 22 ===
Heller originally wanted to call the phrase (and hence, the book) by other numbers, but he and his publishers eventually settled on 22. The number has no particular significance; it was chosen more or less for euphony. The title was originally Catch-18, but Heller changed it after the popular Mila 18 was published a short time beforehand.

== Usage ==
The term "catch-22" has filtered into common usage in the English language. In a 1975 interview, Heller said the term would not translate well into other languages.

James E. Combs and Dan D. Nimmo suggest that the idea of a "catch-22" has gained popular currency because so many people in modern society are exposed to frustrating bureaucratic logic. They write of the rules of high school and colleges that:

This bogus democracy that can be overruled by arbitrary fiat is perhaps a citizen's first encounter with organizations that may profess 'open' and libertarian values, but in fact are closed and hierarchical systems. Catch-22 is an organizational assumption, an unwritten law of informal power that exempts the organization from responsibility and accountability, and puts the individual in the absurd position of being excepted for the convenience or unknown purposes of the organization.

Along with George Orwell's "doublethink", "Catch-22" has become one of the best-recognized ways to describe the predicament of being trapped by contradictory rules.

A significant type of definition of alternative medicine has been termed a Catch-22. In a 1998 editorial co-authored by Marcia Angell, a former editor of the New England Journal of Medicine, argued that:

It is time for the scientific community to stop giving alternative medicine a free ride. There cannot be two kinds of medicine—conventional and alternative. There is only medicine that has been adequately tested and medicine that has not, medicine that works and medicine that may or may not work. Once a treatment has been tested rigorously, it no longer matters whether it was considered alternative at the outset. If it is found to be reasonably safe and effective, it will be accepted. But assertions, speculation, and testimonials do not substitute for evidence. Alternative treatments should be subjected to scientific testing no less rigorous than that required for conventional treatments.

This definition has been described by Robert L. Park as a logical Catch-22 which ensures that any complementary and alternative medicine (CAM) method which is proven to work "would no longer be CAM, it would simply be medicine."

U.S. Circuit Judge Don Willett referred to qualified immunity, which requires a violation of constitutional rights to have been previously established in order for a victim to claim damages, as a Catch-22: "Section 1983 meets Catch-22. Important constitutional questions go unanswered precisely because those questions are yet unanswered. Courts then rely on that judicial silence to conclude there's no equivalent case on the books. No precedent = no clearly established law = no liability. An Escherian Stairwell. Heads government wins, tails plaintiff loses."

== Logic ==
The archetypal catch-22, as formulated by Joseph Heller, involves the case of John Yossarian, a U.S. Army Air Forces bombardier, who wishes to be grounded from combat flight. This will only happen if he is evaluated by the squadron's flight surgeon and found "unfit to fly". "Unfit" would be any pilot who is willing to fly such dangerous missions, as one would have to be mad to volunteer for possible death. To be evaluated, he must request the evaluation, an act that is considered sufficient proof for being declared sane. These conditions make it impossible to be declared "unfit".

The "Catch-22" is that "anyone who wants to get out of combat duty isn't really crazy". Pilots who request a mental fitness evaluation are sane, and therefore must fly in combat. At the same time, if an evaluation is not requested by the pilot, he will never receive one and thus can never be found insane, meaning he must also fly in combat. Catch-22 ensures that no pilot can ever be grounded for being insane even if he is.

A logical formulation of this situation is:

1.	$(E \rightarrow (I \land R))$	For a person to be excused from flying on the grounds of insanity (E), he must both be insane (I) and have requested an evaluation (R).	(premise)
2.	$(I \rightarrow \neg R)$	An insane person (I) does not request an evaluation (¬R) because he does not realize he is insane.	(premise)
3.	$(\neg I \lor \neg R)$	Either a person is not insane (¬I) or does not request an evaluation (¬R).	(2. and material implication)
4.	$(\neg (I \land R))$	No person can be both insane (I) and request an evaluation (R).	(3. and De Morgan's laws)
5.	$(\neg E)$	Therefore, no person can be excused from flying on the grounds of insanity (¬E) because no person can be both insane and have requested an evaluation.	(4., 1. and modus tollens)

The philosopher Laurence Goldstein argues that the "airman's dilemma" is logically not even a condition that is true under no circumstances; it is a "vacuous biconditional" that is ultimately meaningless. Goldstein writes:

The catch is this: what looks like a statement of the conditions under which an airman can be excused flying dangerous missions reduces not to the statement

(i) 'An airman can be excused flying dangerous missions if and only if Cont' (where 'Cont' is a contradiction)

(which could be a mean way of disguising an unpleasant truth), but to the worthlessly empty announcement

(ii) 'An airman can be excused flying dangerous missions if and only if it is not the case that an airman can be excused flying dangerous missions'

If the catch were (i), that would not be so bad—an airman would at least be able to discover that under no circumstances could he avoid combat duty. But Catch-22 is worse—a welter of words that amounts to nothing; it is without content, it conveys no information at all.

== See also ==
- Begging the question
- Circular reasoning
- Cornelian dilemma
- Deadlock
- Double bind
- False dilemma
- Feedback loop
- Godel's incompleteness theorem
- Hobson's choice – taking what is offered or taking nothing
- Ironic process theory
- Kobayashi Maru – a choice presented in Star Trek
- "The Lady, or the Tiger?" – a no-win situation
- List of paradoxes
- Morton's fork
- Mu
- Ninety–ninety rule
- No-win situation
- Pyrrhic victory
- Self-reference
- Social trap
- Strange loop
- Vicious circle
- Wicked problem
- Zugzwang
