= Catch-22 (film) =

1970 American satirical comedy war film

- Theatrical release poster
- Directed by: Mike Nichols
- Screenplay by: Buck Henry
- Based on: Catch-22 by Joseph Heller
- Produced by: John Calley; Martin Ransohoff
- Starring: Alan Arkin; Martin Balsam; Richard Benjamin; Art Garfunkel; Jack Gilford; Buck Henry; Bob Newhart; Anthony Perkins; Paula Prentiss; Martin Sheen; Jon Voight; Orson Welles
- Cinematography: David Watkin
- Edited by: Sam O'Steen
- Music by: Richard Strauss
- Production companies: Filmways; Paramount Pictures
- Distributed by: Paramount Pictures
- Release date: June 24, 1970
- Running time: 122 minutes
- Country: United States
- Language: English
- Budget: $18 million
- Box office: $24.9 million

Catch-22 is a 1970 American satirical comedy war film adapted from the 1961 novel of the same name by Joseph Heller. In creating a black comedy revolving around the "lunatic characters" of Heller's satirical anti-war novel set at a fictional Mediterranean base during World War II, director Mike Nichols and screenwriter Buck Henry (also in the cast) worked on the film script for two years, converting Heller's complex novel to the medium of film.

The cast included Alan Arkin, Bob Balaban, Martin Balsam, Richard Benjamin, Italian actress Olimpia Carlisi, French comedian Marcel Dalio, Art Garfunkel in his acting debut, Jack Gilford, Charles Grodin, Bob Newhart, Anthony Perkins, Austin Pendleton, Paula Prentiss, Martin Sheen, Jon Voight, and Orson Welles. Garfunkel's songwriting partner Paul Simon also appeared, but his scenes were cut.

== Plot ==
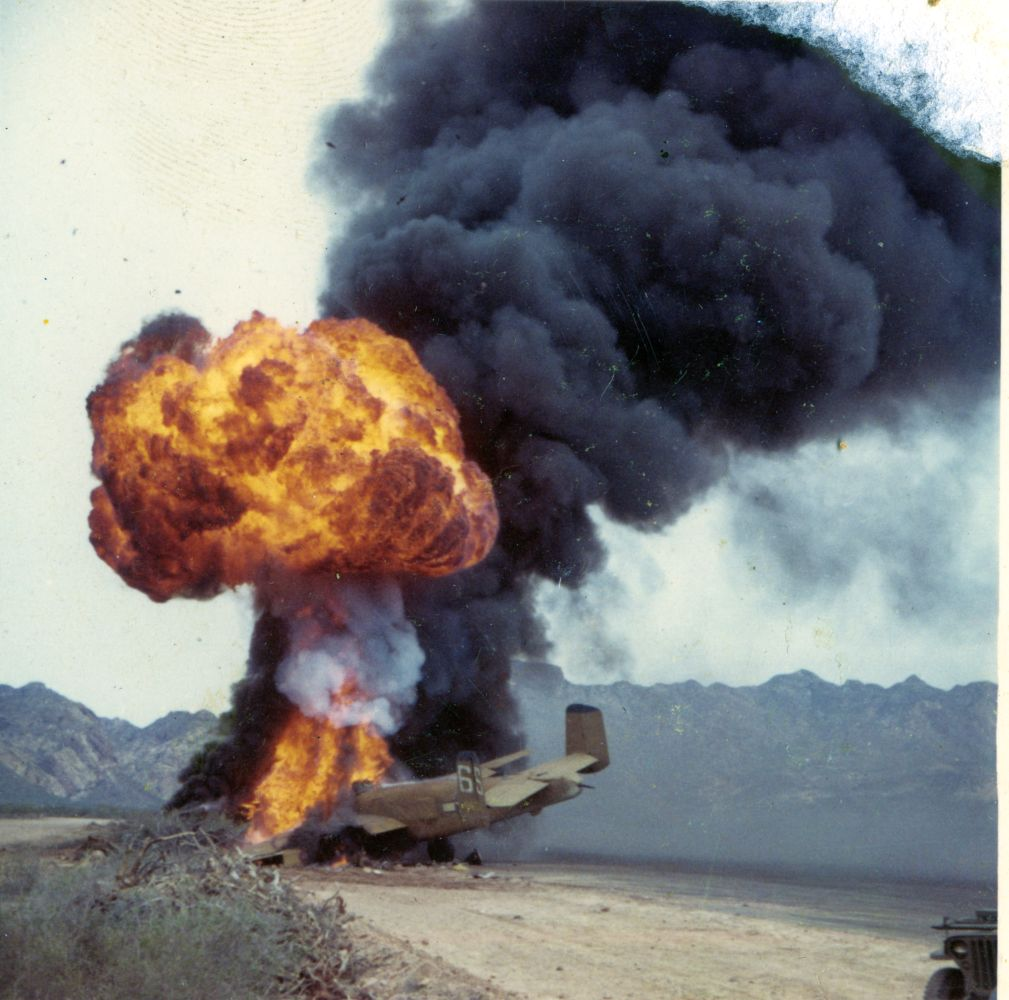
Photo of plane crash from the film taken by a person on the set

Captain John Yossarian, a U.S. Army Air Force B-25 bombardier, is stationed on the Mediterranean base on Pianosa during World War II. Along with his squadron members, Yossarian is committed to flying dangerous missions, but after watching friends die, he seeks a means of escape.

While most bomber crews are rotated out after 25 missions, Yossarian's commanding officer, Colonel Cathcart, keeps raising the minimum number of missions for this base before anyone can reach it, eventually to an unobtainable 80 missions, a figure resulting from Cathcart's craving for publicity, primarily a mention in the nationally syndicated Saturday Evening Post magazine.

Futilely appealing to Cathcart, Yossarian learns that even a mental breakdown is no release when Doc Daneeka explains the "Catch-22" the Army Air Force employs:

An airman would have to be crazy to fly more missions, and if he were crazy, he would be unfit to fly. Yet, if an airman were to refuse to fly more missions, this would indicate that he is sane, which would mean that he would be fit to fly the missions. The airman is thus in an impossible "damned if you do, damned if you don't" situation.

Yossarian is haunted, in several recurring flashbacks during the film, by the bloody death of Snowden, the young turret gunner on his B-25. After Snowden's death, Yossarian temporarily refuses to wear his uniform, which Snowden bled on. He shows up at a medal ceremony naked, and later morosely sits naked in a tree, where he is visited by Lieutenant Milo Minderbinder, who rapidly progresses from squadron supply officer to a capitalistic tycoon involved in black-market money-making schemes. The bomber squadron is populated by many other comically strange characters. Major Major, the squadron's operations officer, is promoted to a squadron commander without ever having flown in a plane and refuses to see anyone in his office while he is in, instructing Sergeant Towser that people can see him when he's out. The person has to wait in the waiting room until Major Major is gone, then can go right in.

Trapped by this convoluted logic, Yossarian watches as individuals in the squadron resort to unusual means to cope; Milo concocts elaborate black market schemes while crazed Captain "Aarfy" Aardvark commits murder to silence a woman he has raped. Lieutenant Nately falls for a sex worker, Major Danby delivers goofy pep talks before every bomb run, and Captain Orr keeps crashing at sea. Meanwhile, Nurse Duckett occasionally beds Yossarian.

Nately dies as a result of an agreement between Milo and the Germans, trading surplus cotton in exchange for the squadron bombing its own base. While on a pass, Yossarian shares this news with Nately's romantic partner, who then tries to kill him.

Because of Yossarian's constant complaints, Cathcart and Lieutenant Colonel Korn eventually agree to send him home, promising him a promotion to major and awarding him a medal for the fictitious saving of Cathcart's life; the only requirement being that Yossarian agrees to "like" the colonels and praise them when he gets home.

Immediately after agreeing to Cathcart's and Korn's plan, Yossarian survives an attempt on his life when stabbed by Nately's partner, who had disguised herself as a janitor. Once recovered, Yossarian learns from Danby and Chaplain Tappman that Orr's supposed death was a hoax and that Orr's repeated "crash" landings had been a subterfuge for practicing and planning his own escape from the madness. Yossarian is informed that Orr ditched the plane and paddled a rescue raft all the way to Sweden on his last run.

Yossarian decides to abandon the deal with Cathcart, leaps out of the hospital window, takes a raft from a damaged plane and, while a marching band practices for the ceremony to award Yossarian the promotion and medal, he hops into the sea, climbs into the raft and starts paddling.

== Cast ==
Main cast (as appearing alphabetically in screen end credits):

- Alan Arkin as Captain John Yossarian (Bombardier)
- Bob Balaban as Captain Orr (Bomber Pilot)
- Martin Balsam as Colonel Chuck Cathcart (Group Commander, 256th Bomb Group)
- Richard Benjamin as Major Danby (Group Operations Officer)
- Susanne Benton as Dreedle's WAC
- Olimpia Carlisi as Luciana, the Alluring Passerby
- Marcel Dalio as Old Man in Whorehouse
- Norman Fell as First Sgt. Towser (Major Major's Desk Clerk, later Acting Squadron Commander)
- Art Garfunkel (billed Arthur Garfunkel) as Lt. Edward J. Nately III (Pilot)
- Jack Gilford as Dr. "Doc" Daneeka (Group Flight Surgeon)
- Charles Grodin as Captain "Aarfy" Aardvark (Navigator)
- Buck Henry as Lt. Colonel Korn (Group XO / Roman policeman)
- Bob Newhart as Captain/Major Major (Laundry Officer, later Squadron Commander)
- Austin Pendleton as Lt. Col. Moodus
- Anthony Perkins as Capt. Fr. Albert Taylor "A. T." Tappman (Chaplain)
- Paula Prentiss as Nurse Duckett (Army Medical Nurse Corps)
- Martin Sheen as 1st Lt. Dobbs (Pilot)
- Jon Voight as 1st Lt. Milo Minderbinder (Mess Officer)
- Orson Welles as Brigadier General Dreedle (Wing Commander)

== Production ==
=== Development ===
Orson Welles first tried to buy the rights to Heller's novel to independently produce and direct it in 1962, but was unsuccessful. He wound up cast in the role of General Dreedle.

Columbia Pictures purchased the rights to it in 1965 and attempted to develop the film with Richard Brooks or Richard Quine as potential directors, while Jack Lemmon was considered as Captain Yossarian. Heller grew dissatisfied with the two as he believed they were “incapable of pursuing the wildly satirical (and anti-military) point of view of his novel.” The studio subsequently sold the rights to Martin Ransohoff at Filmways in 1967, which had already hired Mike Nichols to direct. Nichols originally announced that principal photography would begin in “late 1967-early 1968” in Yugoslavia and Italy. However, the project was delayed for several years as Nichols and John Calley searched for Italian terrain that had not been destroyed by World War II.

Daily Variety in the period 1967-69 reported that Andre Previn would score the picture and that Nichols sought to cast Walter Matthau and Al Pacino in the movie, but none of them participated in the picture. Stacy Keach was also cast in the film before departing a month prior to filming.

=== Filming ===
Nichols eventually decided on Mexico as the primary shooting location of the film. Production began on January 13, 1969, at an airfield constructed for the film near Guaymas, Sonora, on the Gulf of California. The filmmakers spent $180,000 building a five-mile highway to the site (which previously could only be accessed by boat) and an additional $250,000 for a 6,000-ft. runway; the airfield today is Guaymas airport. After a week of filming, Nichols sent back 200 of the American extras in order to give the base in the film a more isolated atmosphere. Welles filmed his cameo appearance as General Dreedle in eight days. Some filming also took place at the Palazzo Farnese and the Palazzo Navona in Rome. Production concluded in August 1969 after a final two months of interior filming in Hollywood.

Paul Simon was cast in a part, as was Art Garfunkel, his partner in the musical group Simon and Garfunkel. Garfunkel's part grew while Simon's part was cut from the final film, a move which contributed to the breakup of the duo, according to Garfunkel.

=== Adaptation ===
The adaptation changed the book's plot. Several story arcs are left out, and many characters in the movie speak dialogue and experience events of other characters in the book. Despite the changes in the screenplay, Heller approved of the film, according to a commentary by Nichols and Steven Soderbergh included on a DVD release. According to Nichols, Heller was particularly impressed with a few scenes and bits of dialogue Henry created for the film, and said he wished he could have included them in the novel.

The pacing of the novel Catch-22 is frenetic, its tenor intellectual, and its tone largely absurdist, interspersed with brief moments of gritty, almost horrific, realism. The novel did not follow a normal chronological progression; rather, it was told as a series of different and often (seemingly, until later) unrelated events, most from the point of view of the central character Yossarian. The film simplified the plot, but it preserved the frenetic pacing, intellectual tenor and realistic tone of the novel.

=== Aircraft ===
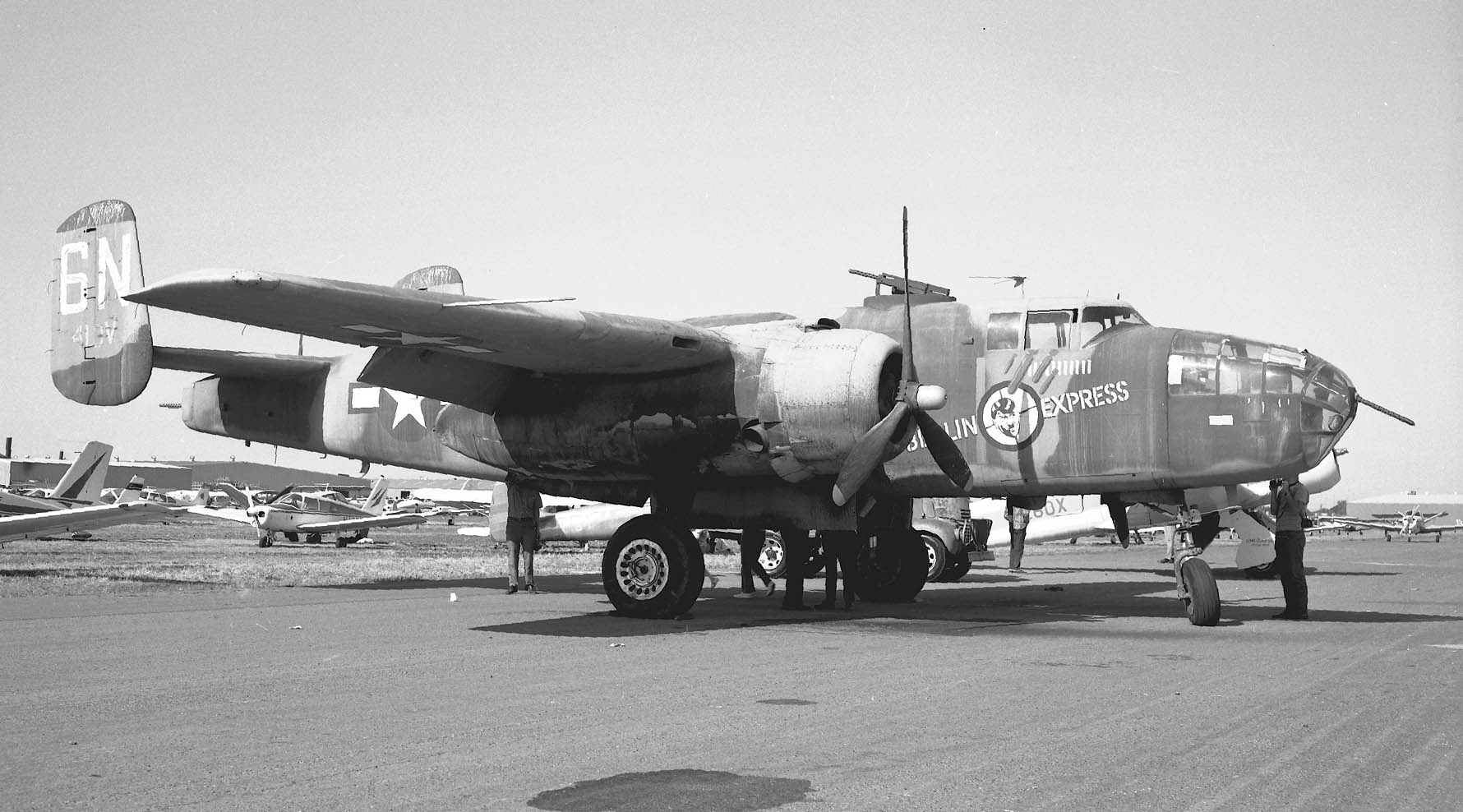
B-25H 43-4432 featured in the film, still airworthy with the EAA as of 2024.

Paramount assigned a $17 million budget to the production and planned to film key flying scenes for six weeks, but the aerial sequences required six months of camera work, resulting in the bombers flying about 1,500 hours. They appear on screen for approximately 10 minutes. (Note: Most of the aerial footage was unused due to a directorial conflict between Nichols and Tallman, head of the Air Operations and Aerial Unit.)

Catch-22 is renowned for its role in saving the B-25 Mitchell aircraft from possible extinction. The film's budget accommodated 17 flyable B-25 Mitchells, and one hulk was acquired in Mexico, and flown with landing gear down to the Guaymas, Sonora, Mexico filming location. The aircraft was burned and destroyed in the crash landing scene. The wreck was then buried in the ground by the runway, where it remains.

For the film, prop upper turrets were installed, and to represent different models, several aircraft had turrets installed behind the wings representing early (B-25C/D type) aircraft. Initially, the camera ships also had mock turrets installed, but problems with buffeting necessitated their removal.

Many of the "Tallmantz Air Force fleet" went on to careers in films and television, before being sold as surplus. Fifteen of the 18 bombers remain intact, including one displayed at the Smithsonian Institution's National Air and Space Museum.

=== Death on the set ===
Second unit director John Jordan refused to wear a harness during a bomber scene and fell out of the open tail turret 4,000 ft (1,200 m) into the Pacific Ocean to his death.

== Release ==
A half-hour preview of the film was held at the San Francisco International Film Festival on October 31, 1969.

The film had premieres on June 24, 1970, in New York, Chicago, Washington, D.C., and Toronto.

=== Home media ===
Catch-22 was released for home viewing on VHS and Beta in 1979, Laserdisc in 1982, and SelectaVision CED disc. Some of the music was changed for the 1992 VHS Hi-Fi re-release.

Catch-22 was re-released to DVD by Paramount Home Entertainment on May 21, 2013; a previous version was released on May 22, 2001. The DVD contains commentary by director Mike Nichols moderated by Steven Soderbergh. Shout! Studios is scheduled to release the film on 4K Blu-ray on October 28, 2025.

== Reception ==
=== Critical reaction ===
On the review aggregator website Rotten Tomatoes, 81% of 31 critics' reviews are positive, with an average rating of 7.3/10. The website's consensus reads: "Catch-22 takes entertainingly chaotic aim at the insanity of armed combat, supported by a terrific cast and smart, funny work from Buck Henry and Mike Nichols." Metacritic, which uses a weighted average, assigned the film a score of 70 out of 100, based on 11 critics, indicating "generally favorable" reviews.

Vincent Canby of The New York Times praised the film as "the most moving, the most intelligent, the most humane--oh, to hell with it!--it's the best American film I've seen this year." He felt the film was "complete and consistent", and commended its balance of comedy and seriousness as well as the ensemble cast. In a cover story about Mike Nichols, Time wrote "It is the book's cold rage that he has nurtured. In the jokes that matter, the film is as hard as a diamond, cold to the touch and brilliant to the eye. To Nichols, Catch-22 is 'about dying'; to Arkin, it is 'about selfishness'; to audiences, it will be a memorable horror comedy of war, with the accent on horror." Roger Ebert of the Chicago Sun-Times gave the film 3 stars out of 4, calling it "a disappointment, and not simply because it fails to do justice to the Heller novel." Ebert wrote there were "some fine moments" in Catch 22, but he condemned the shift in tone from farcical satire in the first half of the film to gore and violence in the final scenes. He also felt the Arkin was "a tremendously gifted actor" but it was an error for him to play Yosarrian as an edgy paranoid, when "the point of the performance should be precisely that he isn’t nuts". The other cast members were not believable in their roles, apart from Perkins, and as a result "the characters don’t come across as human". Nichols's film used a fashionable anti-war message without, as Ebert wrote, "realizing that for Heller World War II was symbolic of a much larger disease: life." Similarly, Gene Siskel for the Chicago Tribune gave the film 2 1/2 stars out of four arguing the film "spends too much time accommodating a huge cast", and instead the film should have properly focused on "Yossarian's combat, with the catch into his head where it belongs". Nevertheless, he wrote "The film's technical credits, photography, and special effects are uniformly outstanding. Of the huge supporting cast, Dick Benjamin, Bob Newhart, and Jack Gilford are the best." Charles Champlin, reviewing for the Los Angeles Times, felt that Catch-22 is awfully good, and also a disappointment: Chilly brilliant at its best but flawed at last by its detachment and by its failure to catch fire and give off heat. Its fury is cold and intellectual and cannot reach us or involve us at gut level."

Richard Schickel in Life magazine panned the film, saying it failed to translate what made Joseph Heller's novel a generational phenomenon to the screen. In his review entitled "One of our novels is missing," Schickel wrote:

Mike Nichols' movie version of the novel is, in tone, as hot and heavy as the original was cool and light. Charitably, one might say that he was seeking the visual equivalent of the book's verbal style. But he failed abysmally, and in the process he and Writer Buck Henry have mislaid every bit of the humor that made the novel emotionally bearable and esthetically memorable, replacing it with desperately earnest proof they hate war.... [T]he key to the film's almost total failure lies in its restructuring of the novel. It is shot as if it were a single hallucinatory flashback suffered by Yossarian, Heller's Everyman-turned-Bombardier.... Far from seeming wild and free, this dream structure struck me as inhumanly manipulative, for it imposes on both the material and the audience a single, simple point of view: I'm crazy, they're crazy, we're all crazy in this crazy world. The characters can't wiggle free of it and live for so much as a single wayward, truly human moment. We, as an audience, are never allowed to think, feel, respond as we will. We are as trapped at a single level of response as ever we were in those hack war movies Nichols mocks.

In later years, film historians and reviewers Jack Harwick and Ed Schnepf characterized the film as deeply flawed, calling Henry's screenplay disjointed, and claimed its only redeeming features were the limited aerial sequences.

=== Box office ===
Upon the initial release, Catch-22 earned US$24.9 million out of the budget of US$18 million, earning it a spot in the top ten box office hits of 1970, but falling short of being profitable. It was director Mike Nichols' third film, after the acclaimed Who's Afraid of Virginia Woolf? and The Graduate. It was not regarded as a comparable success, earning less money and critical acclaim than the film version of MASH, another war-themed black comedy released earlier the same year. In addition, some critics believed that the film appeared as Americans were becoming more resentful of the bitter and ugly experience of the Vietnam War, leading to a general decline in the interest of war pictures, with the notable exceptions of MASH and Patton. Critic Lucia Bozzola wrote "Paramount spent a great deal of money on Catch-22, but it wound up getting trumped by another 1970 antiwar farce: Robert Altman's MASH."

== Adaptations in other media ==
A pilot episode for a Catch-22 television series was aired on ABC in 1973, with Richard Dreyfuss in the Captain Yossarian role.

A six-part Catch 22 miniseries, produced by Hulu and Sky Italia, premiered worldwide in 2019.

== In popular culture ==
The anti-war song "Survivor Guilt" by punk rock band Rise Against features samples of dialog from the movie, specifically the discussion between Nately and the old man about the fall of great countries and potential fall of the US, and their argument about the phrase "It's better to live on your feet than die on your knees." The same excerpts from the film previously were used by lead singer Tim McIlrath, in the song "Burden", recorded by his former band, Baxter.

== See also ==
- List of American films of 1970
