= Captain Black (disambiguation) =

Captain Black is a fictional character in the Captain Scarlet franchise.

Captain Black may also refer to:

- Captain Black (Catch-22), a fictional character in the novel Catch-22
- Code name used by the Ulster Freedom Fighters (UFF), a part of the Ulster Defence Association

== See also ==
- Black Captain
