= Yossarian =

Main character in Joseph Heller novel Catch-22

Also covered in this article are the characters Snowden and Yossarian's tentmates.

Capt. John Yossarian is a fictional character, the protagonist of Joseph Heller's satirical 1961 novel Catch-22 and its 1994 sequel Closing Time. In Catch-22, Yossarian is a 28-year-old captain in the 256th Squadron of the Army Air Forces where he serves as a North American B-25 Mitchell bombardier stationed on the small island of Pianosa off the Italian mainland during World War II. Yossarian's exploits have previously been thought to be based on the experiences of the author. Heller was also a bombardier in the Army Air Corps, stationed on an island off the coast of Italy during the war. Heller later documented in his autobiography "Now & Then" the elements of Yossarian which came from his experiences (specifically the episodes where Yossarian attends to Snowden during the Avignon mission). His background was revised from Jewish to Assyrian-American to appeal to a broader audience. Heller noted that he derived the name Yossarian from a wartime friend and fellow bombardier, Francis Yohannan. Yohannan made the military his career, continuing to serve through the Vietnam War, placing him at odds with Yossarian's feelings towards the military and as noted in his obituary "(Yohannan) turned aside calls from reporters who asked if he was the real-life Yossarian." A possible source for Yossarian's narrative adventure and efforts to be relieved of his combat duties is Lt. Julius Fish, another bombardier and wartime friend to both Francis Yohannan and Joseph Heller.

== Name ==
Yossarian's first name is "John", but this is not revealed until late in Catch-22 when Colonel Korn says to him "Call me Blackie, John. We're pals now." Catch-22 introduces Yossarian as an American soldier in World War II, who claims to have Assyrian heritage. In Closing Time, this is clarified to be a joke and Yossarian is revealed to actually be Armenian.

The exotic name "Yossarian" was chosen by Heller to emphasize his protagonist's detachment from mainstream military culture. Yossarian's name is described as "an odious, alien, distasteful name, that just did not inspire confidence." It was "...not at all like such clean, crisp, honest, American names as Cathcart, Peckem and Dreedle." As to the origins of the name, "Heller admitted in later years that the name 'Yossarian' was derived from the name of one of his Air Force buddies, Francis Yohannan – an Assyrian – but that the character of Yossarian himself was 'the incarnation of a wish' (Now and Then 175-6). When, in 1974, he was asked how he felt about the war when he was in it, Heller wrote, "Much differently than Yossarian felt and much differently than I felt when I wrote the novel … In truth I enjoyed it and so did just about everyone else I served with, in training and even in combat."

== Character sketch ==
=== Motivation ===
Throughout the novel, Yossarian's main concern is the idea that people are trying to kill him, either directly (by attacking his plane) or indirectly (by forcing him to fly missions) and he goes to great lengths to stay alive.

=== Goals ===
Yossarian's motivation is to "live forever or die in the attempt." To survive the war, Yossarian employs a number of stratagems:

- Postponing dangerous missions by any means possible (e.g. poisoning the squadron and moving the bomb line during the "Great Big Siege of Bologna").
- Constantly checking into the hospital with contrived liver complaints ("a pain in his liver that fell just short of being jaundice"), including the fictitious "Garnett-Fleischaker syndrome" and by exploiting the fact he always runs a temperature of 101 degrees Fahrenheit (38 degrees Celsius).
- Ordering his pilot to perform harsh evasive action in the face of flak, something he will not trust anyone else to do.
- "Plotting an emergency heading into Switzerland" so he can be interned for the duration of the war "under conditions of utmost ease and luxury."

Yossarian, unlike many of the other soldiers, tries to escape the realities of war by getting drunk, gorging himself in the mess hall and having sex, although events in the novel make it easy to believe he would do these things anyway.

=== Relationships and conflicts ===
Yossarian is in continual conflict with the military policy "Catch-22," a circularly-reasoned bureaucratic trap which his superiors use to justify many of their illogical demands.

The bulk of Catch-22 concerns Yossarian's relationships with the other officers in his squadron, such as the neurotic Hungry Joe, the war profiteer Milo, the idealistic Nately and selfish Doc Daneeka. There are many characters Yossarian hates and likes. His best friends are Dunbar, Chaplain Tappman, Nately, Hungry Joe, McWatt and Orr. Yossarian is greatly saddened when Clevinger and Orr disappear, despite frequently arguing with these characters. He hates the majority of his superiors for putting him in harm's way, especially the sadistic Joe McCarthy-like careerist Captain Black and the egomaniacal Colonel Cathcart, who continually raises the number of missions required before the aircrews can rotate back home as well as volunteering his aircrews for the most dangerous missions, to make himself look good to his superiors.

Yossarian shows particular grief for the men that die during the novel, particularly Snowden, McWatt, Nately, Dobbs and Hungry Joe or those who disappear: Orr, Clevinger and Dunbar. While the book tells us nothing of Yossarian's relationship with Snowden, it is Yossarian's doomed attempt to save Snowden and his witnessing the latter's gruesome death that forms the emotional centre of the book.

=== Epiphany ===
At the end of the novel, Yossarian accepts a deal with Colonel Cathcart and Colonel Korn rather than face a court-martial for going AWOL in Rome. The deal allows Yossarian to go home but only if he pretends to be "pals" to Colonel Cathcart and Colonel Korn; to "become one of the boys." Korn explains this means the Army is "going to glorify you and send you home a hero, recalled by the Pentagon for morale and public-relations purposes." It allows Yossarian to get out of the war, without any more contribution to the low morale which has been spreading through the Group because of him and to make the colonels look good to their superiors. Yossarian finds this deal "odious" as it lets down all the others in the squadron who were relying on his dissent to force their commanders to treat them better and admits he did it "in a moment of weakness." When he learns the "official report" had twisted the event of Nately's whore stabbing him into Yossarian taking a knife wound from a Nazi assassin to protect the colonels, Yossarian resents being manipulated as "part of the deal."

Yossarian's epiphany comes when he hears of Orr’s escape to neutral Sweden, the culmination of Orr's many attempts to escape combat duty (constantly crashing his plane, the prostitute hitting him over the head, etc.) which Yossarian had interpreted as incompetence; Orr had offered hints of this intention in exchanges between the two. Yossarian realizes it is possible to defeat (or at least escape) the military and the Catch-22 that supports it. Yossarian justifies his desertion by stating "I’m not running away from my responsibilities. I’m running to them. There’s nothing negative about running away to save my life."

== In Catch-22 ==
Throughout the book, Yossarian's main concern is the idea that people are trying to kill him, either directly (by attacking his plane) or indirectly (by forcing him to fly missions). His suspicion develops into paranoia after his attempts to find answers by using logic and reason are thwarted by a combination of vague bureaucracy, transparent yet contradicting Army regulations and personality conflicts. He is unable to fly the required number of missions to be discharged from duty, because his superiors keep increasing the number of missions. He cannot obtain a Section 8 by pretending to be insane because his superiors see his desire to get out of flying as a sign of perfect sanity (hence Catch-22). Yossarian boycotts flying missions as much as possible, either through feigning illness or inventing an excuse to return to base (like a busted intercom.) The novel begins with Yossarian staying in the hospital due to an invented liver condition. He busies himself by arbitrarily censoring letters and signing them Washington Irving, Irving Washington, or (as gets the Chaplain into trouble with authorities) A. T. Tappman, the Chaplain's name (R. O. Shipman in the original version of the book and in British Editions).

Whenever on leave, Yossarian and his friends carouse, drink, and sleep around as much as they can, knowing and fearing they could be killed on the next mission. One of the prostitutes they employ becomes Nately's unofficial girlfriend (she is referred to only as "Nately's Whore" and "Nately's Girl"). Despite Nately's repeated advances, she spurns him cruelly until he, instead of sleeping with her, lets her get a good night's sleep. By the next morning she has fallen deeply in love with him. When Nately is killed, she blames Yossarian for his death; she manifests a towering rage and tries to kill Yossarian several times during the remainder of the narrative in an impossible manner (constantly tracking Yossarian down, even after he dumped her hundreds of miles behind enemy territory.)

=== Yossarian's tentmates ===
The squadron houses its soldiers in large tents. At the start of the novel Yossarian is assigned to a tent with Orr and a third officer referred to as "The Dead Man in Yossarian's Tent" – Lt. Mudd – who was sent on a mission immediately upon his arrival and died in combat before he ever even got the official chance to check in. His belongings remain on the bed where he threw them; due to the illogical bureaucratic procedures the armed forces are shown to follow, the belongings cannot be officially removed since Mudd had never officially arrived.

Yossarian and Orr get along well and Orr customizes the tent making it much more comfortable. After Orr is declared M.I.A. and presumed dead, four new officers are assigned to the tent but Yossarian cannot tolerate them. Sergeant Towser offers Yossarian the option of being assigned to the same tent as Nately but he refuses to leave.

The new tentmates call Yossarian "Yo-Yo" and are afraid of him and go out of their way to help him, always offering him the warmest expressions of goodwill and generally behaving with intolerable conviviality. They are rambunctious because of their young age and lack of military experience. They tend to like those whom Yossarian hates and fears and do not mind the increasing number of missions. They do what Yossarian and the Air Force were unable to do – get rid of The Dead Man in Yossarian's Tent – by throwing his belongings into the woods.

=== Snowden ===
Snowden is a member of Yossarian's flight during a mission and acts as catalyst for the fundamental change in Yossarian's mentality and outlook. After their aircraft is hit by anti-aircraft fire, Snowden is mortally wounded and Yossarian attempts to help by treating a serious leg wound with white bandages and sulfanilamide powder.

Eventually Yossarian notices bleeding from Snowden's armpit and realises he has another wound under his flak suit. As Yossarian rips open the flak suit, a fatal wound beneath exposes Snowden's internal organs which fall out onto the floor. A huge chunk of flak had ripped straight through his ribs from behind. Yossarian is horrified at the sight. Snowden is about to die but is able to tell Yossarian he is cold. Yossarian covers Snowden in a parachute and comforts him by saying "there, there."

Snowden's death embodies Yossarian's desire to evade death; by seeing Snowden's entrails spilling over the plane, he feels that "Man was matter, that was Snowden’s secret. Drop him out a window and he’ll fall. Set fire to him and he’ll burn. Bury him and he’ll rot, like other kinds of garbage. That was Snowden’s secret. Ripeness was all."

The experience on the plane dramatically changes Yossarian's attitude towards life. He looks only to protect his life and to an extent the lives of his friends. Yossarian turns against the military and refuses to wear a uniform, his justification being he simply "doesn't want to," perhaps because he was traumatized and depressed by Snowden's death. The excuse Captain Korn gives to General Dreedle is that Snowden died in one uniform and his remains had soaked into Yossarian's, and all of Yossarian's other articles of clothing were in the laundry. General Dreedle says "That sounds like a lot of crap to me." Yossarian replies, "It is a lot of crap, sir."

=== Finale ===
By the end of the book, just about every other member of his squadron has been killed, disappeared, gone AWOL, or otherwise removed. When Yossarian learns from Captain Black that Nately's Whore's kid sister has been evicted by the Military Police, he flies with Hungry Joe to Rome without leave to try to save her. He can't find her and ends up walking through the street observing all the horrors that come with war. He gets back to the officers' apartment, where Aarfy has raped and murdered Michaela. When the MPs finally come, they do not arrest Aarfy and instead arrest Yossarian for going AWOL.

Yossarian is forced by Colonel Cathcart and Colonel Korn into an odious deal whereby if he acts as their "pal" he will be allowed to go home. The deal is designed so the rest of the squadron will not believe Yossarian will be sent home because he has "turned into such a stubborn son of a bitch" and refused to fly but because – being a hero from the Ferrara mission in which he went into the flak zones a second time without support – he is being sent home as a P.R. representative for the Army.

On leaving the colonels, Yossarian is badly injured when Nately's whore stabs him and he is rushed to hospital where he recovers and is visited by the Chaplain and Major Danby, who confirms the deal with the colonels is still on but Yossarian wishes not to take it as it lets the rest of the squadron down.

While Yossarian is trying to work out how to escape this Catch-22, the Chaplain runs in to announce the missing Orr is alive and well and has rowed his way to neutral Sweden, escaping the war. This gives a new lease on life to the Chaplain, Major Danby and more so to Yossarian who now sees the genius of Orr's plans and makes him determined to escape the war. As Yossarian leaves, Nately's whore again tries to kill him but Yossarian jumps out of the way and runs off.

Closing Time hints the idealistic escape did not occur, with Yossarian saying that when he went home, he was made a major. While Korn and Cathcart are not mentioned, there are implications that perhaps Yossarian took their deal in the end. This reflects more the character of the older Yossarian, who by his late sixties has become a part of the society he spurned in his youth.

== Film portrayal ==
In Mike Nichols' 1970 film adaptation of the novel Yossarian was played by Alan Arkin, while in the 1973 television series pilot Catch-22, based on the novel and the 1970 film, he was played by Richard Dreyfuss. Christopher Abbott plays Yossarian in George Clooney's 2019 mini-series for Hulu.

The miniseries portrays Yossarian with his desire to leave the war intact, but stooping to various lows that harm his fellow soldiers as well as some of his superiors. He has no qualms meeting Cathcart's demands when offered the chance to permanently leave the war and it is only Scheisskopf's intervention - hinted at being for personal reasons - that forces him to stay. The ending has him resigning himself to his missions, albeit without clothes.
