= Martin Balsam =

American actor (1919–1996)

- Balsam in Archie Bunker's Place, 1979
- Born: Martin Henry Balsam; November 4, 1919; New York City, U.S.
- Died: February 13, 1996 (aged 76); Rome, Italy
- Resting place: Cedar Park Cemetery, New Jersey, U.S.
- Education: The New School
- Occupation: Actor
- Years active: 1947-1995
- Notable work: See list
- Spouses: Pearl Somner (m. 1951; div. 1954); Joyce Van Patten (m. 1957; div. 1962); Irene Miller (m. 1963; div. 1987)
- Children: 3, including Talia
- Awards: See list
- Military career
- Allegiance: United States
- Branch: United States Army (Army Air Forces)
- Service years: 1941–1945
- Rank: Sergeant
- Conflicts: World War II; China Burma India theater

Martin Henry Balsam (November 4, 1919 – February 13, 1996) was an American actor. He had a prolific career in character roles in film, theatre, and television. An early member of the Actors Studio, he began his career on the New York stage, winning a Tony Award for Best Actor in a Play for Robert Anderson's You Know I Can't Hear You When the Water's Running (1968). He won the Academy Award for Best Supporting Actor for his performance in A Thousand Clowns (1965).

His other notable film roles include Juror #1 in 12 Angry Men (1957), private detective Milton Arbogast in Psycho (1960), Hollywood agent O.J. Berman in Breakfast at Tiffany's (1961), Bernard B. Norman in The Carpetbaggers (1964), the ship doctor Lieutenant Commander Chester Potter in The Bedford Incident (1965), Colonel Cathcart in Catch-22 (1970), Admiral Husband E. Kimmel in Tora! Tora! Tora! (1970), Mr. Green in The Taking of Pelham One Two Three (1974), Signor Bianchi in Murder on the Orient Express (1974), and Howard Simons in All the President's Men (1976). He had recurring television roles as Dr. Milton Orloff on the medical drama Dr. Kildare (1963-1966) and as Murray Klein on the sitcom Archie Bunker's Place (1979-1983).

In addition to his Oscar and Tony Awards, Balsam was a nominee for a BAFTA Award, Golden Globe Award, and Emmy Award. He and wife Joyce Van Patten are the parents of actress Talia Balsam.

== Early life and education ==
Martin Henry Balsam was born on November 4, 1919 in the Bronx borough of New York City to Russian Jewish parents Lillian (née Weinstein) and Alberto Balsam, who was a manufacturer of shampoo. He attended DeWitt Clinton High School where he participated in the drama club. He studied at the Dramatic Workshop of The New School in New York with the German director Erwin Piscator and then served in the United States Army Air Forces from 1941 to 1945 during World War II, achieving the rank of sergeant. He served as a sergeant radio operator in a B-24 in the China-Burma-India Theater of Operations.

== Career ==
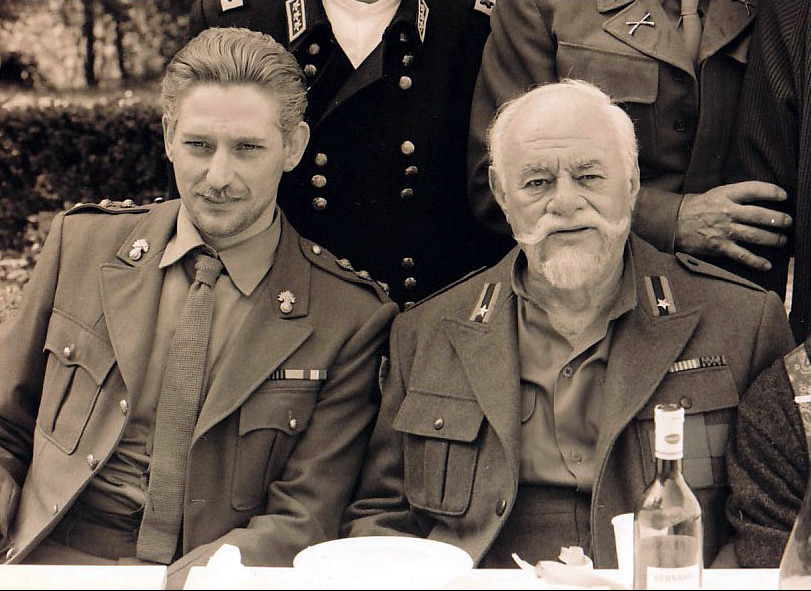
Martin Balsam (r) on the set of Unknown Soldier, 1995

=== Theatre ===
Balsam made his professional debut in August 1941 in a production of The Play's the Thing in Locust Valley. After World War II, he resumed his acting career in New York.

From 1947 to 1949, Balsam was a resident member of the summer stock company Town Hall Players in West Newbury, Massachusetts, a community-sponsored summer theatre. In early 1948, he was selected by Elia Kazan to be a member in the recently formed Actors Studio. He appeared consistently in Broadway and off-Broadway plays. Columnist Earl Wilson dubbed him "The Bronx Barrymore".

In 1968, he won a Tony Award for Best Actor in a Play for his performance in the 1967 Broadway production of You Know I Can't Hear You When the Water's Running.

=== Television ===
Balsam performed in several episodes of Actors Studio, the studio's dramatic television anthology series, broadcast from September 1948 to 1950. He appeared in many other television drama series, including Decoy; the Route 66 episode "Somehow It Gets to Be Tomorrow"; The Twilight Zone in the 1958 pilot episode "The Time Element" and the episodes "The Sixteen Millimeter Shrine" and "The New Exhibit"; Five Fingers; Target; The Corruptors!; The Eleventh Hour; Breaking Point; Alfred Hitchcock Presents; The Fugitive; Mr. Broadway; The Man from U.N.C.L.E. and Murder, She Wrote.

He played Dr. Rudy Wells when the Martin Caidin novel Cyborg was adapted as a TV movie pilot for The Six Million Dollar Man (1973), but he did not reprise the role for the subsequent series. In 1975, he appeared as James Arthur Cummins in the drama Mitchell. He appeared as a spokesman/hostage in the TV movie Raid on Entebbe (1976) and as a detective in the TV movie Contract on Cherry Street (1977). He also appeared on an episode of Quincy, M.E. Balsam starred as Murray Klein on Archie Bunker's Place for two seasons (1979-1981) and returned for a guest appearance in the show's fourth and final season.

=== Film ===
Balsam made his film debut with an uncredited role in On the Waterfront (1954), directed by his Actors Studio colleague Elia Kazan. Balsam played an official of the Port Authority of New York and New Jersey investigating mob involvement in the city's waterfront unions. His breakthrough role came a few years later, when he played Juror #1 in 12 Angry Men (1957). He worked twice more with the film's director, Sidney Lumet in The Anderson Tapes (1971) and Murder on the Orient Express (1974).

In 1960, he appeared in as private investigator Arbogast in Alfred Hitchcock's Psycho. Along with Gregory Peck and Robert Mitchum, Balsam appeared in both the original Cape Fear (1962) and the 1991 Martin Scorsese remake. He won an Academy Award for Best Supporting Actor for his role as Arnold Burns in A Thousand Clowns (1965). Balsam also performed the original voice of the HAL 9000 computer in 2001: A Space Odyssey. He told a journalist in August 1966 "I'm not actually seen in the picture at any time, but I sure create a lot of excitement projecting my voice through that machine. And I'm getting an Academy Award winner price for doing it, too." After his lines were recorded, director Stanley Kubrick decided "Marty just sounded a little bit too colloquially American," and he hired Douglas Rain to perform the role for the released film.

Balsam also appeared in the films Time Limit, Breakfast at Tiffany's, The Carpetbaggers, Seven Days in May, The Bedford Incident, The Man, Hombre, Catch-22, Tora! Tora! Tora! (as Admiral Husband E. Kimmel), Little Big Man, The Taking of Pelham One Two Three, All the President's Men, The Delta Force, and The Goodbye People. One of his later appearances was in the 1994 parody The Silence of the Hams, which paid homage to his role in Psycho.

Beyond Hollywood, Balsam was a popular character actor in Italian films, beginning in 1960 when he starred in the Luigi Comencini film Everybody Go Home. He starred in several poliziottesco films throughout the 1970s, directed by Fernando Di Leo and Enzo G. Castellari. Balsam's roles in these films were be re-dubbed into Italian, but he looped his own lines in the English-language export versions. Balsam maintained close ties to Italy even after the end of the poliziottesco trend, starring in the Italian-produced television series Ocean and La piovra.

== Personal life ==
In 1951, Balsam married his first wife, actress Pearl Somner. They divorced three years later. His second wife was actress Joyce Van Patten. This marriage lasted for four years (from 1958 until 1962) with one daughter, Talia Balsam. He married his third wife, Irene Miller, in 1963. They had two children, Adam and Zoe Balsam, and divorced in 1987.

== Death ==
On February 13, 1996, Balsam died of a stroke in his hotel room while vacationing in Rome, Italy. He was 76 years old. He is interred at Cedar Park Cemetery in Emerson, New Jersey.

== Filmography ==
=== Film ===
Year	Title	Role	Notes
1954	On the Waterfront	Gillette	Uncredited
1957	12 Angry Men	Juror #1	
1957	Time Limit	Sergeant Baker	
1958	Marjorie Morningstar	Dr. David Harris	
1959	Al Capone	Mac Keeley	
1959	Middle of the Night	Jack	
1960	Psycho	Detective Milton Arbogast	
1960	Tutti a casa	Sergeant Quintino Fornaciari	
1961	Ada	Steve Jackson	
1961	Breakfast at Tiffany's	O.J. Berman	
1962	Cape Fear	Police Chief Mark Dutton	
1962	La città prigioniera	Joseph Feinberg	
1963	Who's Been Sleeping in My Bed?	Sanford Kaufman	
1964	Seven Days in May	Paul Girard	
1964	The Carpetbaggers	Bernard B. Norman	
1964	Youngblood Hawke	Himself	Uncredited
1965	Harlow	Everett Redman	
1965	The Bedford Incident	LCDR. Chester Potter	
1965	A Thousand Clowns	Arnold	
1966	Caccia alla volpe	Harry Granoff	
1966	Anyone Around My Base Is It	Narrator	Documentary short
1967	Hombre	Mendez	
1969	Me, Natalie	Harold Miller	
1969	The Good Guys and the Bad Guys	Mayor Wilker	
1969	Trilogy	Ivor Belli	Segment: "Among the Paths to Eden"
1970	Catch-22	Colonel Cathcart	
1970	Tora! Tora! Tora!	Admiral Husband E. Kimmel	
1970	Little Big Man	Mr. Merriweather	
1971	Confessions of a Police Captain	Inspector Bonavia	
1971	The Anderson Tapes	Tommy Haskins	
1972	Chronicle of a Homicide	Judge Aldo Sola	
1972	The Hassled Hooker	District Attorney Turrisi	
1972	The Man	Jim Talley	
1972	The Infamous Column		
1973	The Stone Killer	Al Vescari	
1973	Counselor at Crime	Don Antonio Macaluso	
1973	Summer Wishes, Winter Dreams	Harry Walden	
1974	The Taking of Pelham One Two Three	Harold "Green" Longman	
1974	Murder on the Orient Express	Bianchi	
1975	Smiling Maniacs	Carlo Goja	
1975	Cry, Onion!	Petrus Lamb	
1975	Mitchell	James Arthur Cummings	
1975	Season for Assassins	Commissioner Katroni	
1976	All the President's Men	Howard Simons	
1976	Meet Him and Die	Giulianelli	
1976	Death Rage	Commissario	
1976	Two-Minute Warning	Sam McKeever	
1977	The Sentinel	Professor Ruzinsky	
1977	Silver Bears	Joe Fiore	
1977	Blood and Diamonds	Rizzo	
1978	Eyes Behind the Stars	Inspector Jim Grant	
1979	Gardenia	Salluzzo	
1979	Cuba	General Bello	
1980	There Goes the Bride	Elmer Babcock	
1980	The Warning	Martorana	
1981	The Salamander	Captain Steffanelli	
1984	The Goodbye People	Max Silverman	
1984	Innocent Prey	Sheriff Virgil Baker	
1985	St. Elmo's Fire	Mr. Beamish	
1985	Death Wish 3	Bennett	
1986	The Delta Force	Ben Kaplan	
1986	Whatever It Takes	Hap Perchicksky	
1987	P.I. Private Investigations	Cliff Dowling	
1987	Brothers in Blood	Major Briggs	
1988	The Brother from Space	Father Howard	
1990	Two Evil Eyes	Mr. Pym	Segment: "The Black Cat"
1991	Ľultima meta	Lawyer	
1991	Cape Fear	Judge	
1994	The Silence of the Hams	Detective Martin Balsam	
1995	Soldato ignoto	Priest	
1997	Legend of the Spirit Dog	Gramps	Posthumous release

=== Television ===
Year	Title	Role	Notes
1949	Suspense	Abramson	1 episode
1949-50	Actors Studio	Various roles	5 episodes
1950	Danger		2 episodes
1950	Rocky King, Detective		1 episode
1950-51	Treasury Men in Action		2 episodes
1951	The Living Christ Series	Townsman	Miniseries
1951	The Big Story		2 episodes
1953	Man Against Crime	Jean Pinay, Tony	2 episodes
1953-54	Mister Peepers	Howard, Sgt. Ehrlich	2 episodes
1953-56	Goodyear Television Playhouse	Various roles	4 episodes
1954	Colonel Humphrey Flack		2 episodes
1954	Inner Sanctum Mystery	Various roles	3 episodes
1954-55	The Philco Television Playhouse	Various roles	3 episodes
1955	The Greatest Gift	Harold Matthews #2	
1955	Frontiers of Faith		2 episodes
1955	The United States Steel Hour	Petty Officer	1 episode
1955	Valiant Lady	Joey Gordon	246 episodes
1957-1958	Studio One	Francis Toohey, Ed Coyne	3 episodes
1958	Kraft Television Theatre	Dino	1 episode
1958	Official Detective	Steve Marsh	1 episode
1958	Decoy	Nick Santos	1 episode
1958	Father Knows Best	Teacher	1 episode
1958	Pursuit	Holden	1 episode
1958-59	Playhouse 90	Sam Gordon, Cpt. Mantell	3 episodes
1958-59	Westinghouse Desilu Playhouse	Gambetta, Dr. Gillespie	2 episodes
1958-60	Have Gun – Will Travel	Marshall Jim Brock, Charles Dawes	2 episodes
1958-61	Alfred Hitchcock Presents	Eldon Marsh, Leonard Thompson	2 episodes
1959	Rawhide	Father Fabian	1 episode
1959	The Further Adventures of Ellery Queen	Costa Starchos, Gordon Egstrom	2 episodes
1959	Brenner	Arnold Joplin	1 episode
1959	The DuPont Show of the Month	Charlie Davis	1 episode
1959	Dick Powell's Zane Grey Theatre	Sam Butler	1 episode
1959	Winterset	Garth	TV movie
1959-62	Naked City	Various roles	5 episodes
1959-63	The Twilight Zone	Danny Weiss, Martin Lombard Senescu	2 episodes ("The Sixteen Millimeter Shrine", "The New Exhibit")
1960	Five Fingers	Monteverdi	1 episode
1960	Goodyear Theater	Joe Lane	1 episode
1960	The Robert Herridge Theater		1 episode
1960	NBC Sunday Showcase	Nicola Sacco	1 episode ("Sacco-Vanzetti Story")
1961	Way Out	Bill Clayton	1 episode
1961	The New Breed	Frank Eberhardt	1 episode
1961	The Untouchables	Benjy Liemer, Arnold Justin	2 episodes
1961-63	Route 66	Mike Palinski, Evan Corelli	2 episodes
1961-64	The Defenders	Various roles	4 episodes
1962	Cain's Hundred	Jack Garsell	1 episode
1962	Target: The Corruptors	Jeffrey Marvin	1 episode
1962-66	Dr. Kildare	Ned Lacey, Benny Orloff, Dr. Milton Orloff	7 episodes
1963	The Eleventh Hour	Frank Dunlear	1 episode
1963	Breaking Point	Rabbi Eli Oringer	1 episode
1964	Arrest and Trial	Leo Valera	1 episode
1964	Espionage	Richard Carey	1 episode
1964	Bob Hope Presents the Chrysler Theatre	Dave Breslaw	1 episode
1964	Wagon Train	Marcey Jones	1 episode
1964	Suspense	Detective Jack Gross	1 episode
1964	Mr. Broadway	Nate Bannerman	1 episode
1965	ITV Play of the Week	Doc Delaney	1 episode ("Come Back, Little Sheba")
1965	The Man from U.N.C.L.E	Albert Sully	1 episode
1965	12 O'Clock High	Army Doctor	1 episode
1967	The Fugitive	Andrew Newmark	1 episode
1968, 1970	The Name of the Game	Angie, Herb Witmer	2 episodes
1970	CBS Playhouse	Jesse	1 episode
1973	The Six Million Dollar Man	Dr. Rudy Wells	First pilot episode (Note: Later aired as "The Moon and the Desert: Parts I & II". Balsam was replaced for the 2nd and 3rd pilots by Alan Oppenheimer, and for the series proper by Martin E. Brooks.)
1973	Police Story	Detective Al Koster	1 episode
1974	Kojak	Ray Kaufman	1 episode
1976	Maude	Chester	1 episode
1979-1983	Archie Bunker's Place	Murray Klein	46 episodes
1982	Quincy, M.E.	Hyam Sigerski	1 episode
1985	Great Performances	Jack	1 episode ("Grown Ups")
1985	Glitter	Bo	1 episode
1986, 1990	La piovra	Frank Carrisi, Don Calogero Barretta	6 episodes
1986	Murder, She Wrote	Edgar Carmody	2 episodes
1986-87	The Twilight Zone	Rockne O'Bannon, Professor Donald Knowles	2 episodes ("Personal Demons", "Voices in the Earth")
1987	Hotel	Dr. Gilbert Holt	1 episode
1990	Midnight Caller	Gil Solarski	1 episode

==== TV films, miniseries, and specials ====
Year	Title	Role	Notes
1951	The Living Christ Series	Townsman	
1959	Winterset	Garth	
1967	Among the Paths to Eden	Ivor Belli	
1968	Around the World of Mike Todd	Michael Todd (voice)	Documentary
1970	Hunters Are for Killing	Wade Hamilton	
1970	The Old Man Who Cried Wolf	Stanley Pulska	
1972	Night of Terror	Captain Caleb Sark	
1973	A Brand New Life	Jim Douglas	
1973	Money to Burn		
1974	Trapped Beneath the Sea	T.C. Hollister	
1975	Miles to Go Before I Sleep	Ben Montgomery	
1975	Death Among Friends	Ham Russell Buckner	
1976	The Lindbergh Kidnapping Case	Edward J. Reilly	
1976	Raid on Entebbe	Daniel Cooper	
1977	Contract on Cherry Street	Captain Ernie Weinberg	
1977	The Storyteller	Ira Davidoff	
1978	Siege	Henry Fancher	
1978	Rainbow	Louis B. Mayer	
1978	The Millionaire	Arthur Haines	
1978	A Salute to American Imagination	Himself	Documentary
1979	The Seeding of Sarah Burns	Dr. Samuel Melman	
1979	The House on Garibaldi Street	Isser Harel	
1979	Aunt Mary	Harry Strasburg	
1980	The Love Tapes	David Franklin	
1981	The People vs. Jean Harris	Joel Aurnou	
1982	Little Gloria... Happy at Last	Nathan Burkan	
1982	Night of 100 Stars	Himself	
1983	I Want to Live!	Jack Brady	
1983	Cold Storage	Parmigian	
1985	Space	Senator Glancey	
1985	Murder in Space	Alexander Rostov	
1986	Second Serve	Dr. Beck	
1987	Queenie	Marty	
1987	Kids Like These	Grandpa	
1987	Once Again		
1988	The Child Saver	Sidney Rosenberg	
1989	Ocean	Don Matias Quintero	
1992	The Sands of Time		
1996	O. Henry's Christmas	Wash	

== Stage credits ==
Year	Title	Role(s)	Venue	Notes
1941	Ghost for Sale	Mr. Blow	Daly's 63rd Street Theatre, New York City	Broadway debut
1947	The Wanhope Building	Eddie	Princess Theatre, New York City	
1948	Macbeth	Murderer	National Theatre, New York City	
1948	Sundown Beach	Merle	Belasco Theatre, New York City	
1950	The Liar	Servingman	Broadhurst Theatre, New York City	
1951	The Rose Tattoo	Man	Martin Beck Theatre, New York City	
1953	Camino Real	Ensemble member	National Theatre, New York City	
1956-57	Middle of the Night	The Son-in-Law	ANTA Playhouse, New York City	
1958	A View from the Bridge	Eddie Carbone	La Jolla Playhouse, San Diego	
1962	Nowhere to Go But Up	Moe Smith	Winter Garden Theatre, New York City	
1967-69	You Know I Can't Hear You When the Water's Running	Richard Pawling, George, Chuck	Ambassador Theatre, New York City	
1967-69	You Know I Can't Hear You When the Water's Running	Richard Pawling, George, Chuck	Broadhurst Theatre, New York City	
1967-69	You Know I Can't Hear You When the Water's Running	Richard Pawling, George, Chuck	Lunt-Fontanne Theatre, New York City	
1977-78	Cold Storage	Joseph Parmigian	The American Place Theatre, New York City	
1977-78	Cold Storage	Joseph Parmigian	Lyceum Theatre, New York City	

== Awards and nominations ==
Award	Wins	Nominations
Academy Awards	1	1
BAFTA Film Awards	0	2
Golden Globe Awards	0	1
Primetime Emmy Awards	0	1
Tony Awards	1	1

=== Academy Awards ===
Year	Category	Work	Result
1966	Best Supporting Actor	A Thousand Clowns	Won

=== British Academy Film Awards ===
Year	Category	Work	Result
1976	Best Actor in a Supporting Role	The Taking of Pelham One Two Three	Nominated
1977	Best Actor in a Supporting Role	All the President's Men	Nominated

=== Drama Desk Awards ===
Year	Category	Work	Result
1977	Outstanding Actor in a Play	Cold Storage	Nominated

=== Golden Globe Awards ===
Year	Category	Work	Result
1974	Best Supporting Actor – Motion Picture	Summer Wishes, Winter Dreams	Nominated

=== National Board of Review Awards ===
Year	Category	Work	Result
1964	Best Supporting Actor	The Carpetbaggers	Won

=== Obie Award ===
Year	Category	Work	Result
1977	Distinguished Performance by an Actor	Cold Storage	Won

=== Outer Critics Circle Awards ===
Year	Category	Work	Result
1967	Outstanding Actor in a Play	The Shock of Recognition	Won
1978	Outstanding Actor in a Play	Cold Storage	Won

=== Primetime Emmy Awards ===
Year	Category	Work	Result
1977	Outstanding Supporting Actor in a Miniseries or Movie	Raid on Entebbe	Nominated

=== Tony Awards ===
Year	Category	Work	Result
1968	Best Actor in a Play	You Know I Can't Hear You When the Water's Running	Won
