= Doc Daneeka =

Fictional character by Joseph Heller

Doc Daneeka is a fictional character in the 1961 novel Catch-22 by Joseph Heller. Doc Daneeka is the squadron physician and a friend of the novel's protagonist, Yossarian. "Catch-22" itself is first explained in the novel when Yossarian asks Doc Daneeka to excuse him from combat duty. Doc Daneeka is also the title of Chapter 4 of the novel.

== Character sketch ==
=== Goals ===
Doc Daneeka's goal before he is drafted into the war is to make a successful business out of his medical practice based in New York, he has stated that "my most valuable medical tool is my cash register". He lies to the draft board about his health in an attempt to avoid the war and become well-off, as the competition is drafted instead.

Once he is drafted his main goal is to get through the war alive. He is a hypochondriac who never gets ill, and is looking to avoid anything that would increase the risk to his life. He sees unnecessary risks to include displeasing his superiors for grounding crew and being shipped off to the Pacific Ocean, water and its ability to drown a man, and having to fly in a claustrophobic aircraft, which he likens to "climbing back into the womb".

=== Relationships and conflicts ===
Doc Daneeka is regularly explaining to his good friend Yossarian why he cannot ground him, even though Yossarian helps him collect his flight pay without having to fly. His fears and the constraints of military bureaucracy prevent him from helping his friend. He shows unusual compassion to Yossarian after the death of Snowden.

Doc Daneeka feels the military is responsible for his being drafted into the war effort and put in harm's way, because they were distrustful of him when he lied on his drafting papers about his health. He is constantly scared of upsetting his superiors who may see fit to then ship him off to the far more dangerous South Pacific. Already he sees it as military cruelty to have been assigned to the Air Corps even though he is scared of flying.

Doc Daneeka, as squadron physician, is meant to supervise Gus and Wes who run the medical tent. He generally shows little care for the way they run the tent, basically leaving the growing bureaucracy to decide who is ill enough to be sent to hospital, without reference to medical expertise. This climaxes when Gus and Wes pronounce Doc Daneeka dead at the medical tent against the obvious fact that he is standing alive in front of them.

Doc Daneeka finally falls foul of the bureaucratic processes that are central to Catch-22: when McWatt flies his plane into the mountain after he accidentally kills Kid Sampson, Doc Daneeka's name is on McWatt's crew manifest. Doc Daneeka was not on board the plane, but had an arrangement with McWatt to falsely record his name on the manifest so he could collect flight pay. Doc Daneeka attempts in vain to convince the bureaucracy that he is alive, but the process has already started. He tries to convince his wife that he is not dead, but fails. His wife gives up on him as his death leads to her financial benefit.

Doc Daneeka is forced to share a tent with Chief White Halfoat, whom he is scared of. He is also concerned that he will catch pneumonia from Chief White Halfoat, who is obsessed that he will soon die of pneumonia.

=== Epiphanies ===
During Milo's bombing of the airbase and the death of Snowden, Doc Daneeka shows the compassion for others he lacks throughout the rest of the novel. During the bombing, Doc Daneeka risks his life by attending to the wounded in the field while bombs are still falling, and after Snowden's death, he cleans up Yossarian and treats him for shock.

At the end, Doc Daneeka's bureaucratic death convinces him that maybe he is, in fact, dead.

== Biographical summary ==
=== Actions in Catch-22 ===
==== At home ====
Doc Daneeka was a physician in his hometown of Staten Island, where he initially established a failing practice. As the war effort drafts in more medical personnel, Doc Daneeka's surgery booms, especially with increased kickbacks from the local pharmacies and abortion referrals from the beauty parlors. This lucrative business comes to an end when the military catch up with him after he lies to the draft board about having one leg amputated and being bed-ridden with incurable rheumatoid arthritis.

Doc describes only one experience of his practice at home: a young newlywed couple who are unable to procreate. Doc finds out the girl is still a virgin and is cheeky when he asks about the medal of Saint Anthony that lies between her bosom, and the terrible temptation that this must be for Saint Anthony. When he asks the husband how often they have sex, he boasts "Every night". Doc concludes they have no idea, and with the aid of two rubber models gives a demonstration of intercourse. They thank him for his help and go away to give it a try. Later, the husband returns and, punching him in the nose, cries, "What are you, some kind of wise guy?"

==== In Pianosa ====
Doc Daneeka appears as a petulant man, feeling beaten by the military for losing his advantage of being one of few doctors around back home. As a military doctor, Doc Daneeka has the ability to choose who of the pilots can be grounded from needing to fly more missions, and who must continue. Because of Colonel Cathcart's competing attitude of increasing the missions every time the men meet the requirement, pilots with successful fruition grovel for Doc Daneeka to allow them grounding. Since Doc Daneeka is miserably sour for losing out on his business advantage, he takes it out on the men by not grounding any.

Doc Daneeka is a hypochondriac, who feels something must be physically wrong with himself. He also vainly attempts to remove himself from the military effort; he regularly approaches Gus and Wes, his two nurses, to perform routine physical and check his temperature, which invariably remains a constant, sub-average 96.8 degrees Fahrenheit.

===== Gus and Wes =====
Gus and Wes assist Doc Daneeka and take the responsibility for dealing with the majority of people who visit the medical tent where they have "succeeded in elevating medicine to an exact science".

Their utilitarian method of dealing with any person presenting themselves at the medical tent is to take their temperature. Those with temperatures above 102 °F are sent to the hospital; those below 102° have their gums and toes painted purple with gentian violet solution and are given a laxative that is quickly disposed of in the bushes. Those with temperatures of exactly 102° are asked to return in an hour to have their temperatures taken again. The only exception to this is Yossarian, who normally runs a temperature of 101°, but who can go to the hospital whenever he wants because he is not afraid of them.

Gus and Wes appear to represent organizational functionaries that anyone who has had the misfortune of dealing with an impersonal bureaucracy should recognize.

==== Why me? ====
Doc Daneeka shows he has a total lack of empathy for anyone else and he can only think about his own unfortunate circumstances, characterised with his constant lament "Why me?" From bemoaning his loss of a lucrative medical business because he had lied on his drafting papers, to his complete lack of interest for those under his care that may result him being punished by is superiors if he did care. Even when Yossarian helps Doc Daneeka by allowing him to get his flight pay without actually doing the required number of flights (because he is scared of flying) he will not help:

"You do a favor for me, I'll do one for you. Get it?"

"Do one for me," Yossarian requested.

"Not a chance," Doc Daneeka responded.

This is in total contrast to what might be expected of doctors following the Hippocratic Oath. The Doc does redeem himself, when during Milo's bombing of the airbase, the Doc "loses his head" and works continuously in the field helping the wounded. Also he shows compassion to Yossarian after the death of Snowden over Avignon, by covering him in a blanket and cleaning up Snowden's blood from Yossarian's clothes.

==== Catch-22 ====
Yossarian is Doc Daneeka's only friend on the base. Yossarian, like the other flying officers, continually begs for grounding, although he never successfully accomplishes the number of missions required. Nonetheless, he continues to ask. One day, while Yossarian explains his pitiful circumstances, Doc Daneeka becomes the first in the novel to detail the structured frameworking of what is formally known as "Catch-22"; a circular argument that prevents any of the men from removing themselves from combat:

There was only one catch and that was Catch-22, which specified that a concern for one's safety in the face of dangers that were real and immediate was the process of a rational mind. Orr was crazy and could be grounded. All he had to do was ask; and as soon as he did, he would no longer be crazy and would have to fly more missions. Orr would be crazy to fly more missions and sane if he didn't, but if he was sane he had to fly them. If he flew them he was crazy and didn't have to; but if he didn't want to he was sane and had to. Yossarian was moved very deeply by the absolute simplicity of this clause of Catch-22 and let out a respectful whistle.

"That's some catch, that Catch-22," he [Yossarian] observed.

"It's the best there is," Doc Daneeka agreed.

==== "Death" ====
One of his requisites of being an Air Corps doctor includes logging four hours per month of flight time in order to earn his flight pay. Since Doc Daneeka experiences fears of flight, he gets Yossarian to convince McWatt to add his name to his flight roster so that his hours are recorded, yet he does not need to leave the ground.

While McWatt performs a training flight, he flies too low, killing Kid Sampson on the raft. Because of his grief, McWatt immediately flies into a mountain and commits suicide. Since McWatt's flight roster included Doc Daneeka's name, the military blindly assumes and pronounces that Doc Daneeka also died on the flight. The irony, that Doc Daneeka was standing next to the Sergeant Knight who affirmed this tragedy, is further enforced when Doc Daneeka continues to argue that he did not die.

===== Mrs Daneeka =====
Corporal Whitcomb develops the idea of writing and sending home form letters of condolence from Colonel Cathcart to those who died or went missing in combat. To cover all circumstances, the letter reads as a vague letter that could imply any type of death of any form of relative. At home, Mrs Daneeka receives one of these form letters that her husband has died in combat. She later receives a check from his GI insurance for $250 to finance his funeral. She then continues to receive donations and other insurances that Doc Daneeka paid for. As the proceedings continue to accumulate, she later appears to be pleased that her husband is dead.

Doc Daneeka, enraged with the thickheadedness of the military, writes home two letters to his wife, Mrs Daneeka, addressed by himself. His wife feels uncertain after acquiring the first and asks if it is possible the military made a mistake, but is assured that the letter is simply the work of a "sadistic and psychotic forger". Doc Daneeka futilely composes his second letter which she now believes to be a hoax. The book makes note that she and her children move to a new place; she leaves no forwarding address, and no further reference of her existence throughout the rest of the story.

Doc Daneeka's last appearance in the story is in his tent with Yossarian and Chief White Halfoat, who is about to go up to the hospital to die of pneumonia. His last speech implies that he has accepted that he is bureaucratically a dead man:

'He's dead,' Chief White Halfoat gloated, with a horse laugh entangled in phlegm. 'That's really funny.'
'I don't even draw my pay any more.'
'That's really funny,' Chief White Halfoat repeated. 'All this time he's been insulting my liver, and look what happened to him. He's dead. Killed by his own greed.'
That's not what killed me,' Doc Daneeka observed in a voice that was calm and flat. 'There's nothing wrong with greed. It's all that lousy Dr. Stubbs' fault, getting Colonel Cathcart and Colonel Korn stirred up against flight surgeons. He's going to give the medical profession a bad name by standing up for principle. If he's not careful, he'll be black-balled by his state medical association and kept out of the hospitals.'

Yossarian and Chief White Halfoat ignore him, acting as if he is not there. Doc Daneeka disappears from the story at this point.

== Major themes ==
- Bureaucracy

Doc Daneeka's bureaucratic death parallels one of the main themes of the book that the bureaucratic system holds an impersonal attitude toward those who do not hold power in the higher echelons of the military branch (colonels and generals). There is major irony in his death. The government goes so far to shield the military through political correctness on paper trails as to ignore the blatant, visual proof that Doc Daneeka did not die.

- Medical Ethics
- Catch-22
- Greed

== Film portraits ==
Doc Daneeka was portrayed by Jack Gilford in the 1970 film adaptation of the novel directed by Mike Nichols. Grant Heslov played the character in the 2019 miniseries.

The miniseries diminishes his role. While he still is the one who informs Yossarian about Catch-22, he is not mistaken for being dead and actually does try to help him out in getting sent home, though this fails.
