= Orr (Catch-22) =

Fictional character in the novel Catch-22

Lieutenant Orr is a fictional character in the classic 1961 novel Catch-22 by Joseph Heller. Orr is a World War II bomber pilot who shares a tent with his good friend, the protagonist of the novel, Yossarian. Described as "a warm-hearted, simple-minded gnome," Orr is generally considered crazy. His most notable feature is repeatedly being shot down over water, but, until his final flight, always managing to survive along with his entire crew. On his final flight, approximately two-thirds of the way through the novel, he is again shot down into the Mediterranean, and is lost at sea. Only in the last ten pages of the novel does Heller reveal that Orr's crashes were part of an elaborate (and successful) plot to escape the war.

Orr is the only airman of the group to successfully get away by the end of the novel.

== Character sketch ==
=== Motivations ===
Orr's motivation throughout is to escape the squadron and the war. He is also known for being very mechanically adept and uses his skills to make his and Yossarian's tent as comfortable as possible. This is because Yossarian is his friend, and although Orr intends to escape, he wants to make the tent comfortable for Yossarian.

=== Goals ===
Orr attempts to escape the war in two main ways. His first goal is to get a prostitute to knock him unconscious, so that he can be grounded. When this fails, Orr plans to ditch in the sea and make his way to a neutral country where he can wait out the war. Orr practices this second goal by getting shot down every mission he flies, and so becomes an expert in ditching, without losing a single crewman.

Orr also has a goal of making his and Yossarian's tent as comfortable as possible, for example, by installing a heating system for the tent in time for winter.

=== Relationships and conflicts ===
Orr is good friends with Yossarian and enjoys winding him up with his stories of crabapples and horse-chestnuts or about the prostitute that kept hitting him over the head. He tries to encourage Yossarian to fly with him, insinuating that it would be to his advantage, but Yossarian refuses as he is scared of being shot down. It is not until Orr escapes to Sweden that Yossarian realises that Orr was trying to offer him an escape out of the war with him.

Orr seems to take offense at Appleby, who is patriotic and a conformist. Appleby is also a renowned table tennis player in the squadron, "who won every game he started until the night Orr got tipsy on gin and juice and smashed open Appleby's forehead with his paddle after Appleby had smashed back each of Orr's first five serves. ... Pandemonium broke loose." While Orr is a small man, Appleby is large, strong and athletic, and so is able to get a hold of Orr and almost "smite him dead". However, Yossarian intervened and "took Orr away from him." Yossarian fights Appleby instead; this is the first instance in the novel of Yossarian's protectiveness of Orr. The next day, Orr informs Yossarian that Appleby has "flies in his eyes":

"Oh, they're there, all right," Orr had assured him about the flies in Appleby's eyes after Yossarian's fist fight with Appleby in the officers' club, "although he probably doesn't even know it. That's why he can't see things as they really are."

"How come he doesn't know it?' inquired Yossarian.

"Because he's got flies in his eyes," Orr explained with exaggerated patience. "How can he see he's got flies in his eyes if he's got flies in his eyes?"

Everyone in the squadron presumes that Orr is a simpleton, as evidenced by his optimism, despite the increasing numbers of missions, and the fact that when he crashes his plane into the sea, M&M Enterprises has stolen the CO_{2} cylinders from the life jackets: "Orr hasn't got brains enough to be unhappy," Yossarian says. However, he is eventually revealed to have had the clearest view of the absurdities of their situation through his carefully planned escape to Sweden. Although he has been shot down more times than anyone else in the unit (17), he continues to fly and does not appear afraid of the missions, and he is therefore assumed to be crazy. They do not know that this is part of his plan to escape the war.

Doc Daneeka uses Orr as an example, when explaining the grounding of the insane and "Catch-22." Orr is insane for not requesting to be grounded, even though he is shot down every mission he flies. If he did request to be grounded he would be considered sane for realising the risks of continuing to fly. The "Catch-22" is that you can only be grounded if you are insane. But you must request it, and by requesting it you are considered sane.

=== Epiphany ===
In a conversation with Yossarian in their tent, Orr tries to hint at his reasons for being so obscure, why the prostitute was hitting him over the head and why Yossarian should fly with Orr. In the next mission Orr is lost at sea, and Yossarian believes that he is dead. Only later does Yossarian realize it was all part of a grand plan to escape the war to Sweden, which Orr was trying to encourage Yossarian to be a part of.

== Biographical summary ==
=== Prior story ===
Apart from a brief explanation that Orr is "from the wilderness outside New York City", there is no real detail of Orr's past. We also do not learn his first name in the novel; in the mini-series, however, Milo Minderbinder introduces him as "Ivor Orr" (which sounds like "either or").

=== Actions in Catch-22 ===
==== Improving the tent ====
Orr shares a tent with Yossarian, and is very mechanically adept, as he manages to make for them the most luxurious tent in the squadron. When working on small pieces for an oven stove in the tent, Yossarian sees his work as arduous and highly unnecessary as the pieces are too small for anything of real concern, yet at the end while using his stove, he realizes the intricate simplicity of improving the stove's performance. Although this tinkering drives Yossarian mad, any idea of harming Orr is so absurd that Yossarian can't follow through with it.

==== Crab apples ====
Orr has a bucktoothed smile and frequently puts crabapples or horse chestnuts in his cheeks and rubber balls in his hands. He constantly teases Yossarian asking him if he wants to know why, to which Yossarian invariably says "yes". Orr never gives any straightforward explanation for this other than he wants big cheeks and to detract from the peculiarity of this he keeps rubber balls in his hands. As he explains the latter, "Every time someone asked me why I was walking around with crab apples in my cheeks, I'd just open my hands and show them it was rubber balls I was walking around with, not crab apples, and that they were in my hands, not my cheeks. It was a good story. But I never knew if it got across or not, since it's pretty tough to make people understand you when you're talking to them with two crab apples in your cheeks."

This oddity is analogous to other absurd and ambiguous conversations in the novel, which are circular and end up having little or no significance. He uses this behaviour to draw Yossarian into circular arguments that never seem to be resolved and serve only to frustrate Yossarian (which amuses Orr, who generally chortles at his cleverness).

==== Incident with prostitute ====
An incident with an unnamed prostitute in a hotel in Rome is a puzzling event in the novel, and is only explained to the reader at the end of the novel.

The whole apartment watches as the prostitute jumps up and down naked, and hits a giggling, equally naked Orr on the head with her heeled shoes. Each time she jumps and hit him, Orr giggles louder, making her even more angry. She then would jump even higher and hit him harder, causing him to giggle even more. The vicious cycle ends after fifteen to twenty minutes when she knocks him out cold with a good whack to his head, leaving him with a concussion "that kept him out of combat for only twelve days."

Yossarian, on learning that Orr has escaped to Sweden, in the concluding pages of the novel, understands that she was hired by Orr as part of a plan to be discharged. Yossarian realises that the prostitute was hitting Orr on the head "because he was paying her to, that's why! But she wouldn't hit him hard enough, so he had to row to Sweden." The incident was simply another of Orr's plans to escape from the war.

=== Plane crashes ===
Orr (like Yossarian) has a firm grasp of his situation in the war effort. As the story unfolds between harrowing war scenes and more personable ones such as Orr and Yossarian meeting prostitutes in Rome, Orr more and more enunciates his guile and clever techniques to move toward his freedom from war. At first, his frequent airplane crashes seems to hint toward a clumsy, foolish pilot who has little knack and knowledge for his craft. In the concluding chapters, Orr purposefully crashes for two reasons: to throw off all of the commanding officers who would believe he met his demise and to learn where and how to crash in order to escape to Sweden. The generals, colonels, and other commanding officers in the higher echelons constantly and consistently appear to be vain and care only about their own careers. To expect that Orr could survive a crash would certainly fall out of their range of focus and would not create much of an uproar, especially because of Orr's unfailing "ability" to crash. It is also paradoxical, in the classic way of the novel, that Orr has to crash his plane repeatedly - practising for the time that he will crash his plane.

Throughout the last ten chapters, Yossarian along with Orr thinks diligently about crashing near a neutral country such as Switzerland or Sweden to be interned there for the rest of the war. Since heading directly toward one of the two countries would give the appearance of fleeing similar to AWOL, a more surreptitious and clandestine indirect path would work better. By practicing to crash, Orr learned how to do so in a fashion where he could escape as narrowly as possible to hint at death; those in higher power would simply wave it off and move on with their bureaucratic motives, leaving Orr to his especially spacious freedom. He used the crashes as practice for ocean survival techniques, as is evident when he and his crew members are in a life raft. He learns not only the physical but mental aspects as well, keeping himself jocular and humorous while on the seas to keep from getting bored or going mad. The news of this escape eventually reaches Yossarian while he is in hospital, causing him to undergo a revelation as to Orr's motives about his actions and re-energizes him to keep on "fighting the system". It is only then that he realises that Orr's requests that Yossarian should fly with him was actually a scheme for them both to escape to Sweden.

== Adaptations in other media ==
In Mike Nichols' 1970 film adaptation of the novel, Orr was played by Bob Balaban. He was played in Hulu's 2019 mini-series by Graham Patrick Martin.

== Sources, references, external links, quotations ==
Catch-22 quotes from Wikiquote
