= Nately =

Character in Joseph Heller's Catch-22

Edward J. Nately III is a fictional character in Joseph Heller's satirical 1961 novel Catch-22.

== Background information ==
Nately starts off the book as a 19-year-old Lieutenant, who will be "twenty next January" and who came from a very rich and respected family. (In a flashback his mother reminds him that—in contrast to such vulgar upstarts as the Astors, "whose family, I believe, still lets rooms," and the "vulgar tugboat captain" Vanderbilt—"You are a Nately, and the Natelys have never done anything for their money.") His family originally enlisted him to serve in the Air Corps, believing the war would be over by the time he finished his training and that he would mingle with "gentlemen". Therefore, Nately could gain the pride of enlisting without actually having to fight. Instead, he mingled with Yossarian and Dunbar, and was sent overseas. He lives in a tent with McWatt next to Havermeyer's tent.

His most notable contribution to the book is his involvement with a whore, who is for the most part uninterested in him until he gives her some time to sleep. He is often filled with American optimism, shown by his desire to marry his whore and send her kid sister to a respected U.S. college. He is killed on a mission when Dobbs accidentally flies his plane into Nately's while attempting to evade flak. Nately's whore blames Yossarian and spends the rest of the book trying to murder him with various objects such as a potato peeler.

A chapter later deleted from Catch-22 entitled 'Love, Dad' gives Nately's full name as Edward J. Nately III.

== In other media ==
Art Garfunkel portrayed Nately in the 1970 film adaptation of the novel directed by Mike Nichols. In the film, Nately dies in the bombing of the base by Milo Minderbinder. In the 2019 miniseries, he is portrayed by Austin Stowell.

== Nately's Whore ==
Nately's whore is portrayed as a very tired prostitute who has no interest in sex, and would rather sleep. She is constantly hounded by her younger sister. Therefore, Lieutenant Nately, who is madly in love with her, cannot persuade her to engage in a meaningful relationship with him. She engages him sexually, but it is cold and mechanical, for she refuses to spend any time with Nately without pay. Captain Black would frequently sleep with her to annoy Nately.

However, when she finally does get some rest, she falls as madly in love with Nately as he did for her. Shortly after, Nately dies on a combat mission. When Yossarian arrives in Rome to deliver the bad news to her, Nately's whore blames Yossarian for Nately's death. She subsequently dedicates herself to pursuing Yossarian, and ambushes him several times throughout the remainder of the novel in an attempt to exact revenge for Nately's death by stabbing him. She finally succeeds in stabbing him in the side, sending him to the hospital. Another one of her attacks is the last, albeit minor, comical event in the book.

=== The Kid Sister ===
Nately's Whore's Kid Sister is another character in Catch-22.

Her real name is never mentioned, and Heller only refers to her in terms of her relationship with her sister, even though she is specifically mentioned more than once.

In the plot of the story, she constantly interrupts Nately and his whore while they are having sex as the little girl wants to become a prostitute like her sister. Towards the end of the novel, Yossarian tries to save her after she and all of the prostitutes have been thrown out of their apartment by Military Police. Her whereabouts after this are unknown. At the end of the novel, Yossarian vows to find her and take her with him to Sweden.
