= Milo Minderbinder =

Fictional character in the novel Catch-22

First Lieutenant Milo Minderbinder is a fictional character in Joseph Heller's 1961 novel, Catch-22. As the mess officer of Yossarian's squadron, Minderbinder is an entrepreneur during World War II, "perhaps the best known of all fictional businessmen" in American literature. The Minderbinder character is a "bittersweet parody" of the American dream, both a "prophet of profit" and the "embodiment of evil". Minderbinder also appears in Closing Time, Heller's 1994 sequel to Catch-22.

== Character information ==
Milo Minderbinder is the mess officer at the United States Army Air Forces base who becomes obsessed with expanding mess operations (in which he and everyone else "has a share").

Minderbinder, unlike most characters in Catch-22, who are the subject of only one chapter, is the subject of three chapters (Chapter 22: "Milo the Mayor", Chapter 24: "Milo" and Chapter 35: "Milo the Militant"). He is one of the main characters in the novel. His most interesting attributes are his complete amorality without self-awareness, and his circular logic in running his Syndicate.

=== The Syndicate ===
Minderbinder's enterprise becomes known as "M&M Enterprises", with the two M's standing for his initials and the "&" added to dispel any idea that the enterprise is a one-man operation. Minderbinder travels across the world, especially around the Mediterranean Sea, trying to buy and sell goods at a profit, primarily through black market channels. Everyone has a "share", a fact which Minderbinder uses to defend his actions, stating that what is good for the company is good for all. For example, he secretly replaces the CO_{2} cartridges in the emergency life vests with printed notes to the effect that what is good for M&M is good for the country.

Eventually, Minderbinder begins contracting missions for the Germans, fighting on both sides in the battle at Orvieto, and bombing his own squadron at Pianosa. At one point Minderbinder orders his fleet of aircraft to attack the American base where he lives, killing many American officers and enlisted men. He finally gets court-martialed for treason. However, as M&M Enterprises proves to be incredibly profitable, he hires an expensive lawyer who is able to convince the court that it was capitalism which made America great, and is absolved only by disclosing his enormous profit to the investigating congressional committee.

In typical Catch-22 satirical fashion, Minderbinder's business is incredibly profitable, with the single exception of his decision to buy all Egyptian cotton in existence, which he cannot unload afterwards (except to other entrepreneurs, who sell the cotton back to him, because he simply ordered all Egyptian cotton) and tries to dispose of the cotton by coating it with chocolate and serving it in the mess hall. Later, Yossarian gives Minderbinder the idea of selling the cotton to the government, quoting Calvin Coolidge's assertion that "the business of government is 'business'."

The exact size of Minderbinder's syndicate is never specified. At the beginning of the novel, it is merely a system that gets fresh eggs to his mess hall by buying them in Sicily for one cent, selling them to Malta for four and a half cents, buying them back for seven cents, and finally selling them to the mess halls for five cents. However, the syndicate is soon revealed to have become a large company, and then an international syndicate, making Minderbinder the Mayor of Palermo, Assistant Governor-General of Malta, Vice-Shah of Oran, Caliph of Baghdad, mayor of Cairo, and the god of corn, rain, and rice in various pagan African countries. Whenever Minderbinder appears in one of his cities, an impromptu holiday with parades forming around him are declared.

=== Relationship to Yossarian ===
Minderbinder tends to trust the novel's protagonist Yossarian more than he trusts anyone else because Yossarian — an unselfish man of principle — is so unlike himself. After learning that Yossarian can have all the dried fruit he wants, which he then gives to friends in the squadron, Minderbinder decides that he can be trusted because "anyone who would not steal from the country he loved would not steal from anyone." However, he continually ignores Yossarian's pleas for help because of his preoccupation with running M&M Enterprises. He ultimately betrays Yossarian by striking a deal with Colonel Cathcart: Yossarian's squadron must fly additional missions, and Minderbinder gets the credit. When Nately's Whore's Kid Sister, a young girl for whom Yossarian comes to care deeply, goes missing, Minderbinder agrees to help him find her, but abandons the attempt in order to smuggle illegal tobacco.

== In other media ==
Minderbinder is portrayed by Jon Voight in the 1970 film adaptation of the novel, and by Daniel David Stewart in the 2019 TV miniseries. The Minderbinder character of the miniseries comes across as more sympathetic and less tyrannical than the earlier representation in the 1970 film or the original in the 1961 book, at least in his personal interactions with Yossarian. He gets the position of mess officer after pitching lamb chops to Major de Coverley in the first episode. His ultra-capitalist business undertakings are taken even further, with M&M presented as ″an unstoppable enterprise″. A running gag is that whenever he explains how he accomplishes his grandiose tasks to other characters, often involving technical acts of treason, it is drowned out and censored by background noise.

== Literary significance ==
Joseph Heller intentionally seeded Catch 22 with "anachronisms like loyalty oaths, helicopters, IBM machines and agricultural subsidies", all of which only appear in the McCarthy Era, in order to create a more contemporary atmosphere. Likewise, Heller created Minderbinder's famous saying "What's good for Milo Minderbinder, is good for the country" (insert Syndicate or M&M Enterprises for Milo Minderbinder) as a parody of Charles E. Wilson, who is often misquoted as saying "What is good for General Motors is good for our country" during a hearing of a Senate subcommittee in 1952. Wilson was the head of General Motors in 1952, but became Secretary of Defense in January 1953, thus being an early example of the military-industrial complex, which the Minderbinder character well represents.

According to Heller, he modeled the character traits of Minderbinder — fast-talking, self-promoting, thoroughly conscienceless — on his Coney Island childhood friend Marvin Winkler (or Beansy to friends). Winkler is described at length in Heller's 1998 memoir Now and Then.

Milo Minderbinder has become an archetypal unabashed war profiteer in the American novel, similar to Charles Holt in the 1863 novel The Days of Shoddy by Henry Morford, and the later characters Marcus Hubbard in the Lillian Hellman play Another Part of the Forest, Joe Keller in the Arthur Miller play All My Sons and Noah Rosewater in the Kurt Vonnegut novel God Bless You, Mr. Rosewater.
