= Colonel Cathcart =

Character in Joseph Heller's novel Catch-22

Colonel Cathcart is a character in Joseph Heller's novel Catch-22 (1961) and the novel's de facto main antagonist.

A full colonel, he is a group commander at a U.S. Army Air Forces base in Pianosa and is obsessed with becoming a general. As such, he does whatever it takes to please his superiors—in particular, by repeatedly raising the number of missions the men have to fly to complete a tour of duty, beyond that normally ordered by other outfits. This becomes the bane of Yossarian's life, as every time he comes close to obtaining the target number of missions for being sent home, Colonel Cathcart raises the required number again.

Cathcart himself has only flown in two missions, one of which was accidental.

== Feathers and black eyes ==
Cathcart nightly makes lists of "feathers in his cap" and "black eyes", often finding something in the former category is in fact in the latter one, considering all the possible ways in which his superiors could react to them. In his attempts to please nearly everyone, Cathcart discovers that all the other soldiers hate him. This perception lives largely in his mind, but it affects his relationships with the others and they soon begin to actually dislike and/or avoid him. His paranoia, matched only by his arrogance, worsens throughout the course of the novel.

== Catch-22 ==
The concept of Catch-22 is also represented in the character of Colonel Cathcart (whose name is an anagram for both "catch art" and "rat catch"), as he consists entirely of irreconcilable oppositions and maintains an illogical thought process that echoes that of the catch. Cathcart is a master of political doublespeak, often completely contradicting what he says seconds after he says it, usually when a superior officer disagrees with him.

== Yossarian ==
Cathcart hates Yossarian almost as much as Yossarian hates him. When Yossarian publicly refuses to fly any more missions, Cathcart moves to have him court martialed, but his right-hand man, Colonel Korn, talks him out of it, advising him that a dismissal from the Air Force is exactly what he wants; Cathcart instead decorates him to ensure that he will stay in the service.

When Yossarian is caught AWOL in Rome, Cathcart is eager to have him court martialed and imprisoned, but Korn once again persuades him to offer him the credit for enough missions to send him home instead, to hush the whole affair up. Yossarian briefly considers the offer, but changes his mind when he hears that Orr got out of duty by escaping to Sweden.

== Film ==
In Mike Nichols' 1970 film adaptation of the novel, Colonel Cathcart is portrayed by Martin Balsam. In the 2019 TV miniseries adaptation, he is portrayed by Kyle Chandler.
