= List of Catch-22 characters =

The following is a list of characters in the 1961 novel Catch-22 by Joseph Heller.

== Significant characters ==
=== Yossarian ===
Captain John Yossarian is the fictional protagonist in Joseph Heller's novel Catch-22 and its sequel Closing Time. In Catch-22, Yossarian is a 28-year-old captain (later major) in the fictional 256th Bombardment Squadron of the United States Army Air Forces (USAAF) and the bombardier of a North American B-25 Mitchell, stationed on the small island of Pianosa off the Italian mainland during World War II. Yossarian's exploits are based on the experiences of the author; Heller was also a bombardier in the USAAF, stationed on an island off the coast of Italy during World War II. Yossarian is described as a tall, broad, Assyrian man, who frequently causes panic by starting rumors or orchestrating events that either keep him out of direct battle or somehow usurp authority. Examples of these exploits include poisoning the mess hall with bath soap, accepting an award while naked, and altering a map so a mission will be canceled.

=== Chaplain Tappman ===
Tappman (also called R. O. Shipman in some editions) is a naïve Anabaptist minister from Kenosha, Wisconsin. As he is extremely timid and terrified of authority, the chaplain is tormented throughout the novel by his rude, manipulative, atheist assistant, Corporal Whitcomb. Easily intimidated by the cruelty of others, the Chaplain is a kind, gentle, and sensitive man who worries constantly about his wife and children at home. He is described as a man of 32 years of age with tan hair, brown eyes, and a narrow, pale face. His sister is a master sergeant in the Marines.

=== Colonel Cathcart ===
A full colonel, Chuck Cathcart is a group commander at the USAAF base in Pianosa and is obsessed with becoming a general. As such, he does whatever it takes to please his superiors, in particular by repeatedly raising the number of missions in a tour of duty beyond norms. Ironically, this provokes no reaction from the generals, who are apathetic regarding the war efforts, but becomes the bane of Yossarian's and Hungry Joe's lives. He is a 36-year-old man with short graying curly hair, a tall yet beefy build, extremely pale skin, and a host of self-confidence issues. He is described as mildly conceited, and yet is found to be constantly comparing himself to others, often finding himself displeased with the conclusions he reaches. Cathcart is also obsessed with maintaining a public image of extreme masculinity, most likely due to his apparent insecurity.

=== Doc Daneeka ===
Dr. Dan Daneeka is the squadron flight surgeon and a friend of Yossarian. Doc Daneeka's main motivation is for his own welfare, whether that be making money or protecting his own life. He generally forgets his moral duty as a physician except in the most extreme of circumstances. Doc Daneeka resents the military, both for drafting him and for finding out that he lied on his drafting papers. He is constantly terrified of being transferred to the far more dangerous Pacific theater. Afraid of flying, he often has himself falsely listed as being aboard flights; this practice comes back to bite him when McWatt crashes a plane Daneeka is supposedly aboard and he is pronounced dead.

=== Milo Minderbinder ===
First Lieutenant Milo Minderbinder is the mess officer at the Pianosa USAAF base. He is a highly entrepreneurial black marketeer who becomes obsessed with expanding mess operations and trading goods for the profit of the syndicate (in which he and everyone else "has a share"). He is "perhaps the best known of all fictional businessmen" in American literature. The Minderbinder character is a "bittersweet parody" of the American dream, both a "prophet of profit" and the "embodiment of evil".

=== Lieutenant Nately ===
Nately's family originally encouraged him to serve in the USAAF, believing the war would be over by the time he finished his training and that he would mingle with "gentlemen." Therefore, Nately could gain the pride of enlisting without actually having to fight. Instead, he mingled with Yossarian and Dunbar, and was sent overseas. He lives in a tent with McWatt. His most notable contribution in the book is his involvement with the Italian woman "Nately's Whore," who is for the most part uninterested in him until he saves her from a sleepless night with generals, thus giving her an opportunity to get some sleep. He is often filled with American optimism, shown by his desire to marry his whore and send her kid sister to a respected college in the United States. He is killed on a mission when Dobbs flies his plane into Nately's. Nately's Whore blames Yossarian and spends the rest of the book trying to murder him.

=== Orr ===
A bomber pilot in the squadron who is continually being shot down and ditching in the sea. Described as "a warm-hearted, simple-minded gnome," Orr is the only person in the group considered to be crazier than Yossarian, with whom he shares a tent. Orr appears to take great joy in thoroughly confounding those around him by being completely nonsensical, though this later appears to have been deliberate. He is declared 'missing in action' halfway through the novel after another crash-landing in the Mediterranean, but it later transpires that he has intentionally crashed and then rowed to neutral Sweden to escape the war. At this point, Yossarian realizes that Orr's constant crashes have been rehearsals for the escape plan, which inspires Yossarian to finally flee the army.

=== Snowden ===
Snowden is a radio-gunner in Yossarian's crew. When their aircraft is hit by anti-aircraft fire and Snowden is hit, Yossarian bandages his visible leg wound, but misses a fatal wound hidden by his clothing. This incident is generally referred to in the novel as "the death over Avignon". Yossarian obsesses over Snowden's death and loses his nerve on account of it.

=== Captain Aardvark ===
Captain Aardvark (called Aarfy) is the navigator in Yossarian's B-25 bomber (but only when Yossarian is flying in the lead ship – hence Aarfy's sporadic appearances in the air in the novel). He is oblivious to flak, repeatedly gets lost on missions, and always smokes a pipe. Yossarian comments that Aarfy is just not intelligent enough to be afraid of the war. Aardvark befriends Nately in the hope of working for Nately's wealthy father after the war. Aarfy sees himself as moral and protects well-connected women from the sexual advances of other officers, but he ends up raping and murdering the innocent maid Michaela. When asked by Yossarian why he did not simply hire a prostitute, he repeats his common admonition that "Old Aarfy has never paid for it." He shows no remorse for these crimes until he begins to worry that he might be brought to justice for them.

=== Major Major Major Major ===
The ineffectual squadron commander of the base in Pianosa, who was named Major Major Major by his father as a joke; passing up the lesser possibilities of "Drum Major, Minor Major, Sergeant Major, or C Sharp Major"; and was later made a Major by an IBM machine with a sense of humor. He is disliked by most of the enlisted men in Pianosa because he was promoted so suddenly, and he chooses to remain isolated from the other people at the base, letting Sergeant Towser handle the operations of the base. Major doesn't allow people to see him in his office while he is in his office; they can only see him when he isn't there. He utilizes Yossarian's alias, Washington Irving, to shirk official document duties.

=== Lieutenant (later Colonel and eventually General) Scheisskopf ===
Scheisskopf is the training unit commander for Yossarian and Clevinger, and takes a particular dislike to Clevinger. Even though Clevinger is just as serious about parades as Scheisskopf, and his ideas help the squadron win multiple parade competitions, Scheisskopf still considers him a "wise guy", and someone that needs to be "brought down a peg or two." He is at constant odds with his wife's masochistic libido, as his love for parades leaves him too busy to pay any attention to her. Scheisskopf is an ambitious and humorless man who is absolutely in love with war and is only happy when the opposing side is losing.

== Other characters ==
- Appleby – A fair-haired young pilot from Iowa. He is described as being "as good at shooting craps as he was at playing ping-pong, and he was as good at playing ping-pong as he was at everything else." Appleby's character appears to represent those who thrive to a certain extent within a bureaucratic system and feel threatened by others who do not play along as much as they would like them to. He follows regulations without question and does everything he is supposed to do, managing to succeed with minimal effort at whatever he does. He believes in God, motherhood, and the American Way of Life.
- Captain Black – The squadron's intelligence officer. Because of the lack of risk involved in not flying missions, Captain Black wanted to take over Major Duluth's position as squadron commander when Duluth was killed over Perugia. He was thwarted in this by the appointment of Major Major to the position. Captain Black constantly mocks his fellow countrymen at the Pianosa airbase when they are faced by dangerous missions by telling them to "eat your liver." Since he is the camp's intelligence officer, he is not on combat duty and can therefore maintain his gleeful attitude to the men risking their lives in the air. Black is a paranoid anti-Communist and pressures all the men to take loyalty oaths, but out of personal spite prevents Major Major from taking one. He deliberately seeks out Nately's Whore on his visits to Rome and brags about their trysts to Nately.
- Colonel Cargill – Before the war, Cargill was a successful, though completely untalented, marketing executive who was well known for being terrible at his job and was often hired to purposefully make businesses fail for tax reasons. In the Air Force, Colonel Cargill used his legendary lack of skills as General Peckem's troubleshooter.
- Clevinger – A highly principled, highly educated man who acts as Yossarian's foil within the story. He is a Harvard graduate whom Yossarian characterises as having "lots of intelligence but zero brains". Clevinger is very rigid in his own opinions and is further described as such: excessively philosophical, politically a humanitarian, lacking in social tact, and a person of all facts but no passion. His optimistic view of the world causes Yossarian to consider him to be a "dope," and he and Yossarian each believes the other to be crazy. Yossarian also comments that Clevinger crusades against bigotry by balking in its face, proving Clevinger to be an extremely submissive character. During cadet course he is brought to trial and found guilty on phony charges by Lt. Scheisskopf. His plane mysteriously vanishes in a cloud and he's never seen again.
- Lieutenant Coombs – The previous assistant intelligence officer. He dies in the same plane crash that kills Kraft.
- Nurse Cramer – Nurse Duckett's best friend. She is a shapely, pretty, young girl who refuses to have any relations with the men at all, so Yossarian dislikes her. After Nurse Duckett starts a relationship with Yossarian, puritanical Nurse Cramer stops speaking to her.
- Major Danby – The fighting group operations officer. An intellectual college professor with a passive and somewhat melancholic yet serene outlook on life who sees himself as a poor match for the armed services due to his lack of aggression. He briefs the airmen on upcoming missions and often acts as a mediator for disputes between enlisted men and as a confidant to most of the officers.
- Mrs. Daneeka – Doc Daneeka's wife. When the doctor is mistakenly declared dead after listing himself fraudulently on a flight manifest for a doomed flight, she finds herself suddenly widowed and rich, and moves away, leaving no forwarding address.
- Major — de Coverley – Major — de Coverley has a terrifying visage in the Biblical tradition, such that men will do his desires without his even saying a word. No one dares ask his first name, and the exact nature of the Major's duties within the bomber group is uncertain. He is Major Major's executive officer, but at the squadron base in Pianosa his only official duties are pitching horseshoes, renting apartments for the soldiers on rest leave, and kidnapping Italian laborers to help around the base. He also rapidly put an end to Captain Black's "Glorious Loyalty Oath Crusade" by demanding “gimme eat” then demanding that they “give everybody eat”. His frequent appearance during the fall of major cities makes him an object of interest to intelligence agencies on both sides, neither of which can identify him.
- General Dreedle – The commander of the USAAF base in Pianosa, Dreedle is a blunt and ill-tempered man. He is an archetypal no-nonsense military man who does not care what the men under his command do as long as they fight and die unquestioningly when given orders. Despite this, he is generally apathetic regarding the war effort (having lost all drive after he was made General and he found he had "nothing more to aim for") and now mostly busies himself with harassing his son-in-law, Colonel Moodus. His arch-rival is General Peckem, head of Special Services in Rome; the two men frequently have their disputes mediated without their knowledge by the desk clerk, ex-P.F.C. Wintergreen.
- Dobbs – Originally a healthy young man, the effects of excessive combat missions have shot Dobbs' nerves, and when the book begins he is emotionally unstable and physically spent. He is described as being one of the worst pilots in the corps and his mid-air panic leads him to snatch the controls of the plane away from Huple, leading to the death of Snowden. He plots to kill Colonel Cathcart but will only do it if Yossarian tells him it's a good idea, which Yossarian never does. He shares a tent with Kid Sampson. He accidentally collides with Nately's plane, killing both crews.
- Nurse Sue Ann Duckett – At the start of the novel Nurse Duckett does not like Yossarian; later, she has a relationship with him, jeopardizing her friendship with Nurse Cramer. She breaks off her affair with Yossarian when she decides to marry a doctor, and realizes she should not jeopardize her chances by carrying on openly with Yossarian.
- First Lieutenant Dunbar – An airman and fellow bombardier stationed at the same base as Yossarian. He and Yossarian seem to have similar personalities, and so they make fast friends. Like Yossarian, Dunbar's chief goal is to prolong his life to whatever extent possible, often by cultivating boredom. He frequently accompanies Yossarian in the hospital, faking injuries to stay out of combat like his friend does. He is later 'disappeared' by the army when he becomes rebellious and unstable.
- Major Duluth – The previous squadron commander. He was killed over Perugia.
- Dori Duz – Scheisskopf's wife's close friend. A lively “tart” who has relations with all the men in the company once as she refuses to sleep with anyone she finds to be mediocre again. Thus, she sleeps with Yossarian once and he spends a small part of the novel pining after her since he knows she doesn't want him.
- Second Lieutenant Anthony F. Fortiori - A patient staying in the same hospital where Yossarian is being treated for a leg wound. He is easily pushed around by both Dunbar and Yossarian, who pull rank on him. Due to Major Sanderson getting Fortiori's official army record instead of Yossarian's, he is sent home instead.
- Captain Flume – Captain Flume is the squadron's public relations officer, until he moves out of the trailer he shares with Chief White Halfoat after Halfoat jokingly threatens to slit Flume's throat open from ear to ear. He spends most of the book living like a hermit in the woods, which gradually drives him insane. By the end of the novel, Flume moves back into the trailer he shared with Halfoat after the latter starts dying of pneumonia.
- Giuseppe (the soldier who sees everything twice) – A delirious soldier who creates a panic in the hospital by shouting, "I see everything twice!" Yossarian imitates him (by seeing two fingers regardless of whether a doctor holds up one, two, or none) and later impersonates him when he dies. The soldier's family does not notice that Yossarian is not their son.
- Gus and Wes – Doc Daneeka's two orderlies, whose main activity is to paint airmen's gums and toes purple with gentian violet solution. They are extremely efficient and have a list of steps on determining if someone is sick so that there will be certainty when diagnosing. Daneeka hates them because they refuse to declare him ill so that he can go home.
- Captain Havermeyer – Havermeyer lives in the tent next to Yossarian's, and according to Colonel Cathcart he is "the best damn bombardier we've got." This was because he insists on flying his plane dead straight to, over, and past the target despite any anti-aircraft fire he receives. Yossarian despises him because of his insistence in putting his (Yossarian's) life in danger. He is also slightly unstable and enjoys shooting mice at night with the gun he stole from a dead man in Yossarian's tent. However, despite their love of duty, even Havermeyer begins to hate the constant raising of the number of missions. By the end he also reveals his main ambitions, to not embarrass his wife and kid and to join the reserves after the war.
- Huple – A fifteen-year-old pilot who lied about his age to get into the Army. He shares a tent with Hungry Joe on the wrong side of the railway tracks and is shy and nervous, but is a thoroughly idealistic patriot, which is why Yossarian feels sorry for him; he feels he'll probably die too young. He has a cat that constantly sleeps on Hungry Joe's face. He owns a wristwatch that Hungry Joe forces him to keep in a sock. He is the pilot flying when Snowden dies over Avignon.
- Hungry Joe – A perverted soldier who is noted for constantly trying to photograph women nude, claiming to be a photographer for Life magazine (which, ironically, he was before the war, although none of his pictures developed correctly). He is the only pilot who consistently finished the required number of missions (but was forced to continue flying as his paperwork was always delayed until the flight limit was elevated) and has screaming nightmares until he's ordered back onto combat status. He is constantly triggered by loud or sudden noises, making Huple keep his watch in a sock due to the constant ticking and getting startled when McWatt purposefully snaps his cards. He enjoys randomly choosing diseases to worry about at will. He dies when he's suffocated by Huple's cat.
- Sergeant William Knight – The turret gunner on Yossarian's plane; he accidentally begins a panic prior to the Bologna operation when he brings extra flak jackets, causing everyone to think the target is deadly.
- Corporal Kolodny – Captain Black's despised assistant. He erroneously reports that Bologna has been captured by the Allies after Yossarian surreptitiously redraws the lines on a battle map. Kolodny is forced to sign hundreds of loyalty oaths in Black's name each day. During a Thanksgiving party, he drunkenly shoots himself in the leg while playing with his pistol.
- Lieutenant Colonel Korn – Colonel Cathcart's intellectual assistant and right-hand man. Korn appears alongside Cathcart throughout the novel and it becomes clear that Korn does most of the thinking and most of the work for Cathcart, who only takes the credit. Korn is portrayed as much more relaxed and less ostentatious than his superior, but much more sadistic and cynical. Much like Cathcart he has ambitions for higher military rank but chooses to be below Cathcart and remain outside the limelight so that, if something goes wrong, Cathcart will take the fall instead of him. Korn is described as a bald stocky, dark, flaccid man with a shapeless paunch, who wears rimless spectacles.
- Kraft – A man killed at the bombing of a bridge at Ferrara. Yossarian blames himself, as he ordered the planes back after they missed the first time. He was a skinny, harmless kid from Pennsylvania who only wanted to be liked. It is later revealed that his death was actually Aarfy's fault because he didn't accurately navigate them.
- Luciana – A woman whom Yossarian briefly dates in Rome and whom he spends a great deal of the second half of the book looking for, without success. She refuses to marry Yossarian because she believes he's crazy for wanting to marry her at all.
- McWatt – The pilot of Yossarian's plane, one of his closest friends and Nately's roommate as well. A young man who appears to be very calm and serene and whom Yossarian considers to be crazy because he remains sane during the war. He enjoys flying his plane low to scare Yossarian, which eventually leads to Yossarian choking him and threatening to murder him during one of their combat training sessions. After this, McWatt is sympathetic towards Yossarian and seems to realize that Yossarian might actually be going insane. McWatt accidentally kills Kid Sampson when flying too low and slicing him in half with a plane propeller, driving him to commit suicide by crashing his plane into a mountain.
- Major Metcalf – One of the judges presiding over the Action Board during Clevinger's trial. He is extremely cowardly and strongly resembles Clevinger in many ways, inevitably leading to him being shipped away as well at the end of the trial.
- Michaela – The poor, plain, simple-minded, hard-working young maid who works in the apartments where Yossarian and his unit stay while in Rome. She is a sweet and innocent girl who doesn't speak English and whom the enlisted men mostly leave alone, except when they mock her in English so she can't understand them. She is raped and murdered by Aarfy, who simply dismisses the murder as inconsequential because he's "good old Aarfy, who never pays for it".
- Colonel Moodus – General Dreedle's son-in-law, whom the general hates and constantly tries to harass and have demoted. Moodus thinks Dreedle is a know-it-all that cannot take criticism. He is the only colonel that Cathcart trusts. He is also depicted as slightly heroic, correcting his father-in-law when the aforementioned ordered for Major Danby's execution, when even Cathcart and Korn wouldn't.
- Lieutenant Mudd – More frequently referred to as "the dead man in Yossarian's tent," Mudd was killed in action before officially joining the squadron. Due to the bureaucratic uncertainty over the status of Mudd, no one will accept responsibility for Mudd and his belongings, and Sergeant Towser refuses to accept the man existed at all.
- Colonel Nevers – The colonel who held Cathcart's position before he was killed on Yossarian's 23rd mission.
- General P. P. Peckem – A pompous, pretentious and highly delusional general who desperately wants to take over General Dreedle's post as the superior commanding officer of Pianosa. Because of this ambition, he has a vicious rivalry with Dreedle and constantly tries to undermine him and have him demoted. His attempts are mostly thwarted without his knowledge by desk clerk ex-P.F.C. Wintergreen, who enjoys making Peckem look foolish.
- Piltchard and Wren – Two captains in charge of squadron operations that are always mentioned in tandem and are in charge of organizing combat crews for missions. They are sympathetic towards Yossarian, despite his desire to avoid missions. Both are described as mild, soft-spoken men who are average in pretty much every aspect and yet love flying and so they assign themselves to every single mission.
- Corporal Popinjay – The clerk present at Clevinger's trial; he is imprisoned for being too specific in his shorthand.
- Lieutenant Kid Sampson – A young soldier described as having "...an angular, comical face with arched eyebrows and a scrawny blond mustache". He is killed by the propeller of McWatt's airplane. The event drives McWatt to suicide which in turn causes Doc Daneeka's bureaucratic "death". He shares a tent with Dobbs.
- Major Sanderson – A neurotic psychiatrist who is convinced that Yossarian is mentally unstable because he acts rationally.
- Mrs. Scheisskopf – Scheisskopf is always too busy planning parades to fulfill his wife's masochistic sexual fantasies. Instead, she sleeps with Scheisskopf's cadets, so they can all get revenge on her husband and she can get back at him for the lack of attention. She purports to be atheist but is actually a devout believer.
- Sammy Singer – The tailgunner on Yossarian's bomber when Snowden dies. While he is just a minor character in Catch-22, he becomes one of the main characters in the sequel, Closing Time.
- Corporal Snark – The mess sergeant before Milo Minderbinder. He was demoted for purposely poisoning sweet potatoes with soap chips, giving the squadron diarrhea, which he did at Yossarian's request. Snark is now referred to as Milo's "first chef". He is described as "...an intellectual snob who felt he was twenty years ahead of his time and did not enjoy cooking down to the masses."
- Dr. Stubbs – The doctor in Dunbar's squadron who grounds any pilot who requests it. He falls into an existential crisis after Colonel Korn shuts down his medical tents.
- Sergeant Towser – Major Major's assistant; he prevents anyone from seeing the Major while he is in his office, and only allows them in when the Major is gone. Due to Major Major's unwillingness to see anyone, Towser is the de facto head of the 256th squadron. Towser also holds no desire for a promotion or any interest in the war.
- Corporal (later Sergeant) Whitcomb – An atheist who constantly antagonizes and looks to usurp Chaplain Tappman, his direct superior. He is openly rude and contemptuous, absolutely detests his seclusion in the woods, and is very easily offended. He is later promoted to sergeant by Cathcart after telling him about his idea with sending fake personalized letters to deceased soldiers families.
- Chief White Halfoat – An American Indian whose family was forced to move from wherever they settled because oil was always discovered. He is transferred to Pianosa after Wintergreen strikes an oil pipe and nearly drowns. In the army, he works as Captain Black's assistant. He jokingly threatens to slit Captain Flume's throat while he sleeps, which accidentally drives Flume to paranoid madness. After this, he becomes Doc Daneeka's tent mate and terrorizes him as well. During the Siege of Bologna, he decides that he will eventually die of pneumonia, which he ultimately does.
- Ex-P.F.C. Wintergreen – An ex-P.F.C. because of his constant urge to go AWOL, Wintergreen has been demoted so many times that he entertains hopes of becoming an ex-general. Due to his position in charge of mail distribution, he wields a great amount of power in the novel. By forging documents and destroying mail, he becomes more powerful than the generals. His main concern throughout the novel is humiliating General Peckem because he was the first person to have demoted him. He also frequently butts heads with Milo as they are both in the black market business.

== Unnamed characters ==
- The C.I.D. Investigators The first CID man is sent to investigate the excessive censoring being done by a soldier signing his name as "Washington Irving", an alias Yossarian used on a whim. He enters the hospital, posing as a patient, then comes down with pneumonia and becomes a real patient. The second CID man is sent to investigate the continued use of "Washington Irving"'s name, which is now at the hands of Major Major. He goes undercover as a pilot but blows his cover by telling everyone who he is. The two investigators end up pursuing each other instead of making any actual headway in their cases.
- Dreedle's girl – Allegedly a nurse, she follows General Dreedle wherever he goes. She is a very attractive woman and Dreedle keeps her around to torment his son-in-law, Colonel Moodus, hoping to catch him in an adulterous situation for which he can punish him.
- The maid with the lime-colored panties A woman with whom Yossarian paradoxically falls in love, because she is the only woman that Yossarian can't possibly fall in love with. Her charm lies in how willing she is to have relations with anyone who asks her.
- Nately's Whore A prostitute in Rome with whom Nately is deeply in love. She despises Yossarian and is wildly apathetic towards Nately until he allows her to get some sleep. She has a young sister whom Nately is determined to send to college. After Nately dies, Nately's whore blames Yossarian for his fate and spends the rest of the novel attempting to murder him.
- Nately's Whore's Kid Sister The young sister of the prostitute Nately fancies in Rome. After her older sister develops a mania against Yossarian, she and the prostitutes are turned out onto the streets.
- The new recruits A group of new young officer-pilots whom Yossarian hates. They are friends from back home and are excited to take part in the war. They take over most of Yossarian's tent and throw out all of Mudd's belongings.
- The old man in Rome – A 107-year-old man who lives in the brothel frequented by Nately. He sides with whoever is in power and mocks Nately's idealism. He reminds Nately uncomfortably of his own father for the reason that the old man is absolutely nothing like his father.
- The Soldier in White – An unnamed soldier wrapped completely in bandages. He is connected to two bottles of unidentified liquid, one of which feeds into him through an IV, while the other drains from his catheter. When the bottles are respectively empty and full, their roles are exchanged. Dunbar claims there is actually no one under the bandages. The other patients avoid him because they dislike the fact that he is worse off than they are. The Texan is the only patient who talks to him and tries to convince the others to do so. He eventually dies without anyone realizing. Later, a burn victim named Lieutenant Schmulker is admitted to the hospital with similar bandages; the other patients experience mass hysteria, convinced that the original Soldier in White has mysteriously returned.
- The Texan – A patriotic soldier who keeps the men from staying in the medical ward to hide out from the war by being overly friendly. He is in the ward when Dunbar and Yossarian enter, attempting to escape their duties in their respective squadrons, but they are eventually chased out by his pleasant demeanor.
