= 25th Critics' Choice Awards =

2020 US film and television awards

- Date: January 12, 2020
- Site: Barker Hangar, Santa Monica, California, United States
- Hosted by: Taye Diggs

Highlights
- Most wins: Film: Once Upon a Time in Hollywood (4); Television: Fleabag (3)
- Most nominations: Film: The Irishman (14); Television: When They See Us (6)
- Best Picture: Once Upon a Time in Hollywood
- Best Comedy Series: Fleabag
- Best Drama Series: Succession
- Best Limited Series: When They See Us
- Best Movie Made for Television: El Camino: A Breaking Bad Movie
- Website: www.criticschoice.com

Television/radio coverage
- Network: The CW

The 25th Critics' Choice Awards were presented on January 12, 2020, at the Barker Hangar at the Santa Monica Airport, honoring the finest achievements of filmmaking and television programming in 2019. The ceremony was broadcast on The CW and Taye Diggs returned to host for the second consecutive time. The nominations were announced on December 8, 2019. HBO led with 33 nominations, followed by Netflix with 31.

== Winners and nominees ==
=== Film ===
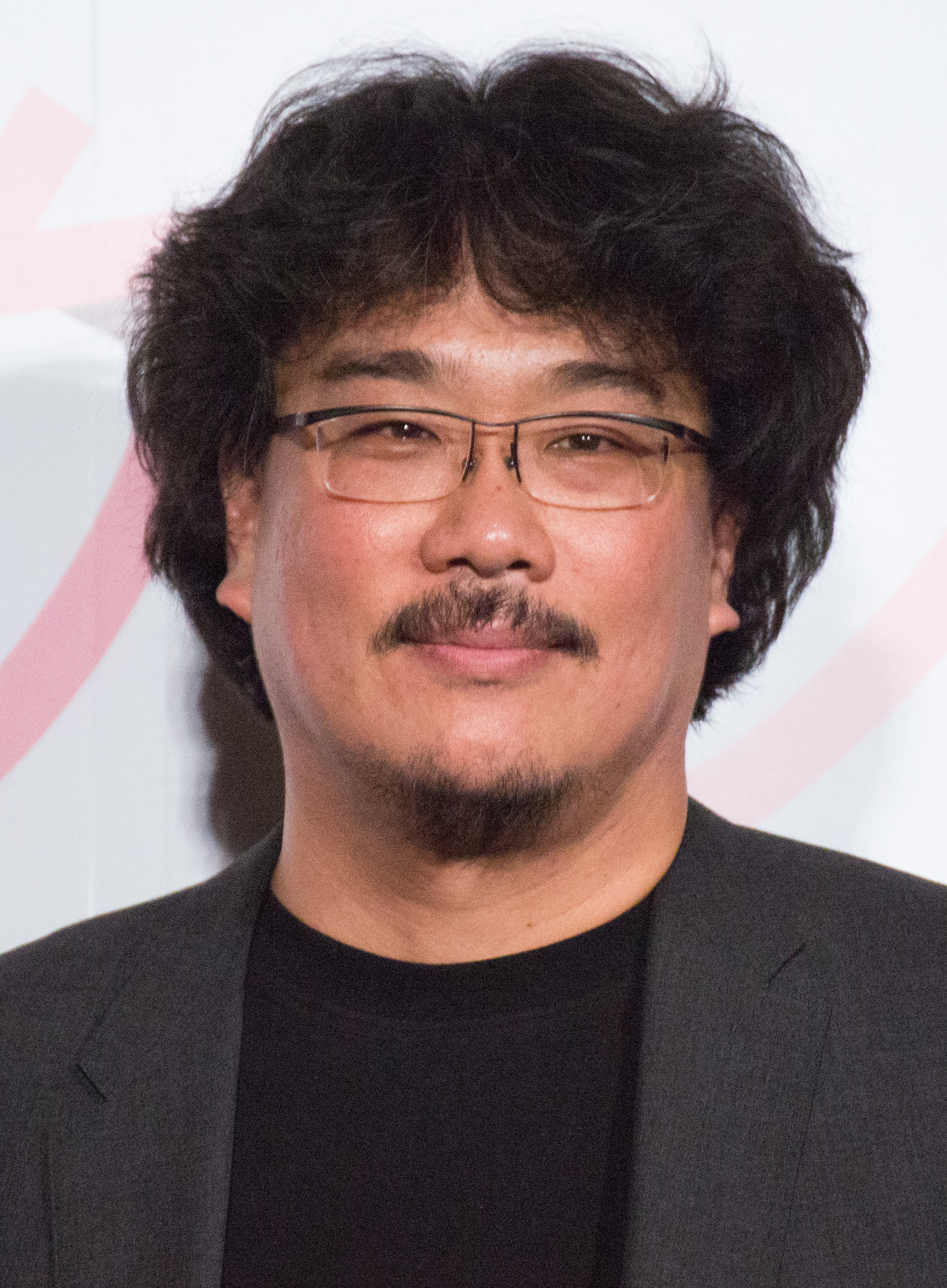
Bong Joon-ho, Best Director co-winner

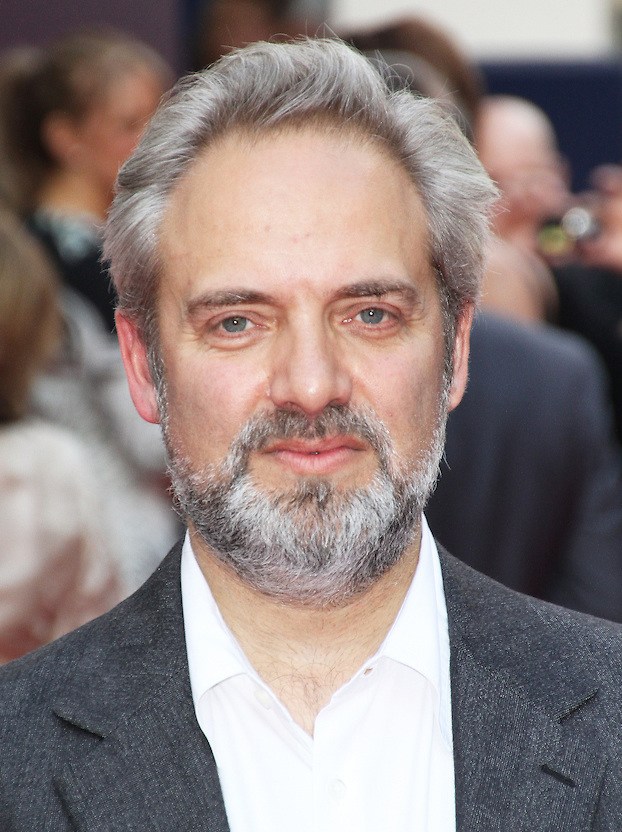
Sam Mendes, Best Director co-winner

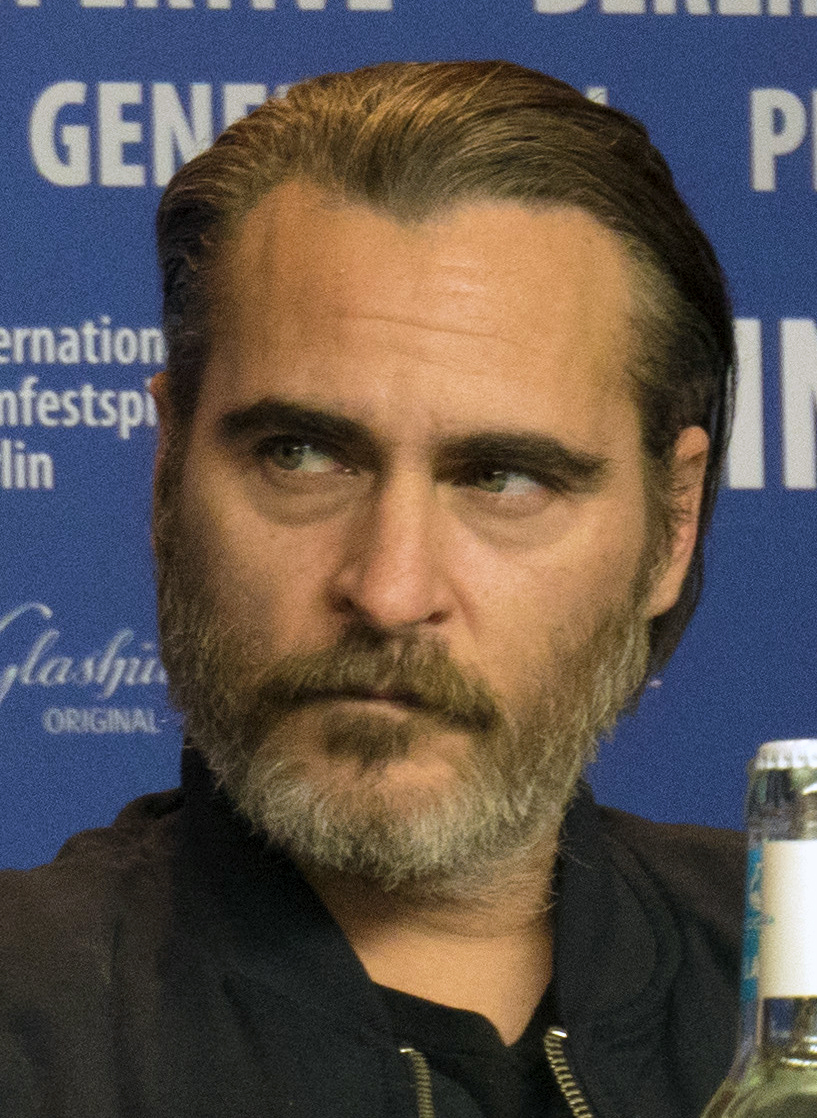
Joaquin Phoenix, Best Actor winner

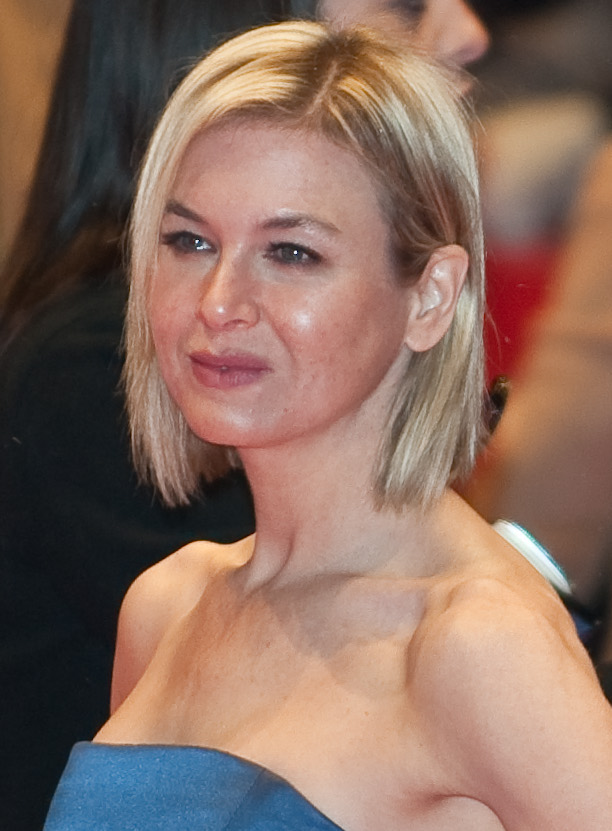
Renée Zellweger, Best Actress winner

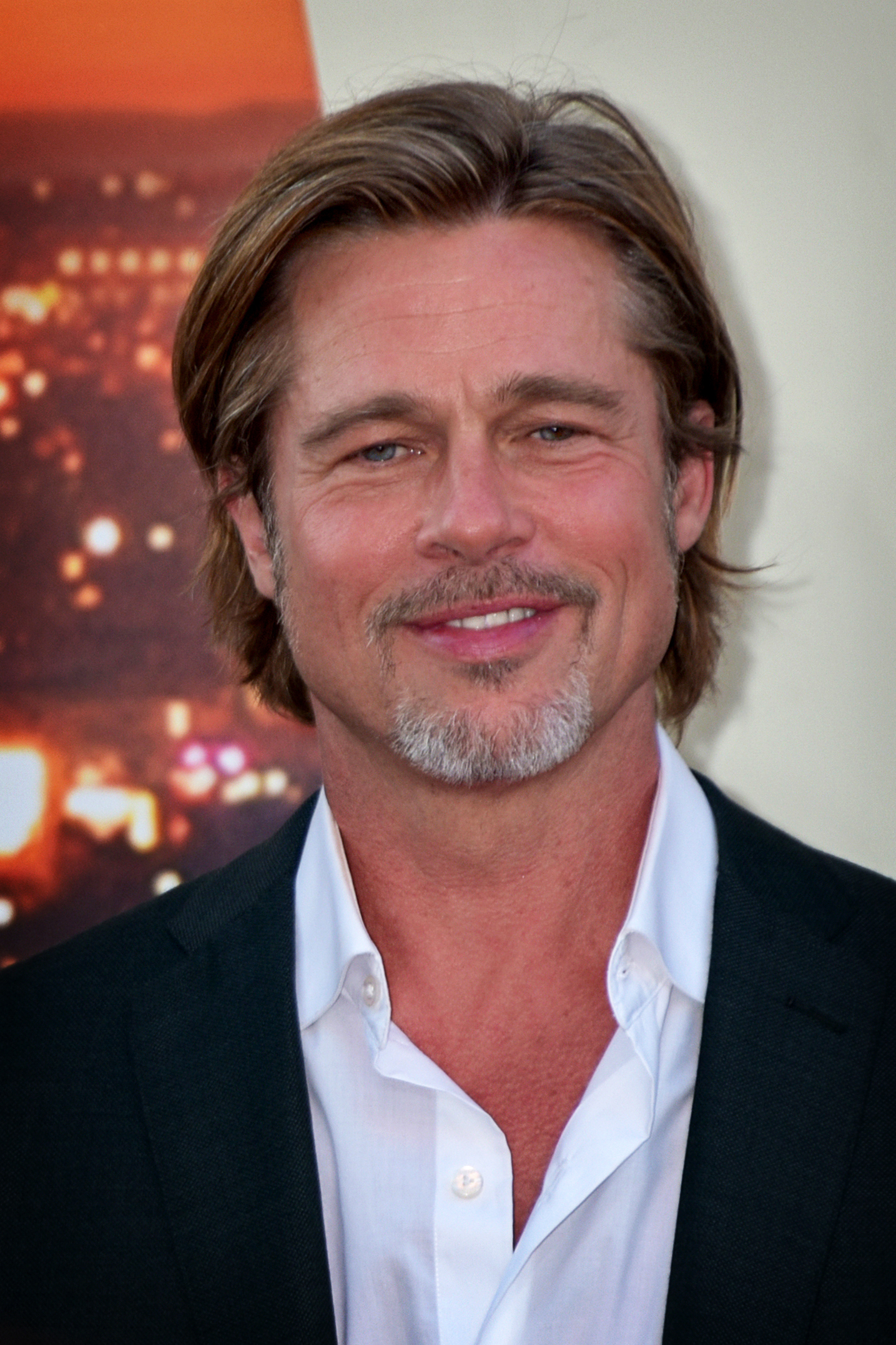
Brad Pitt, Best Supporting Actor winner

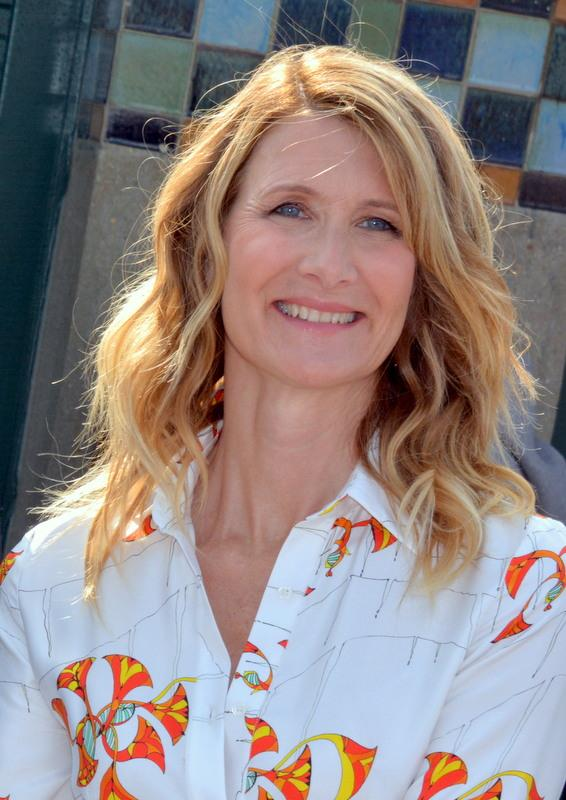
Laura Dern, Best Supporting Actress winner

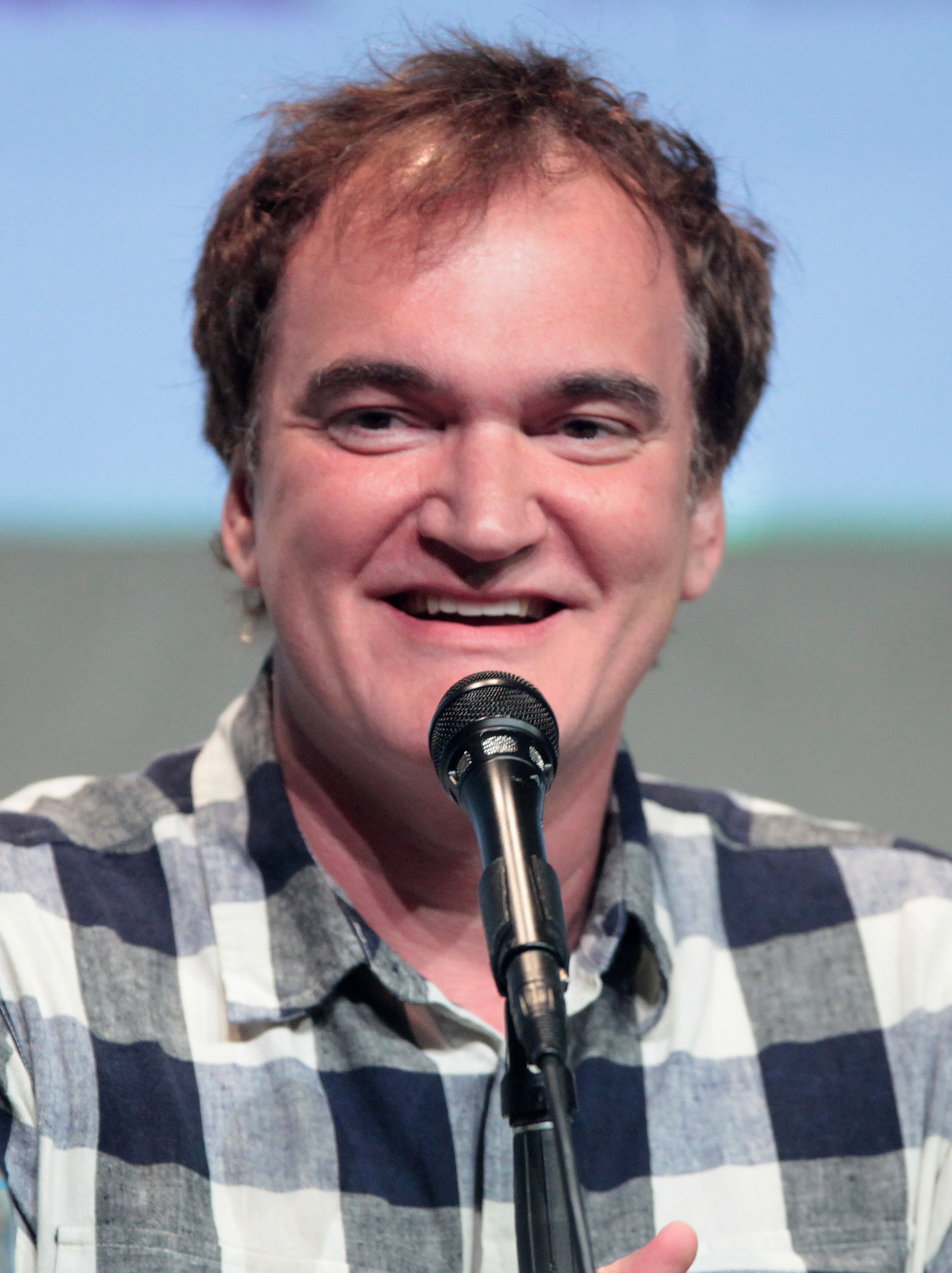
Quentin Tarantino, Best Original Screenplay winner

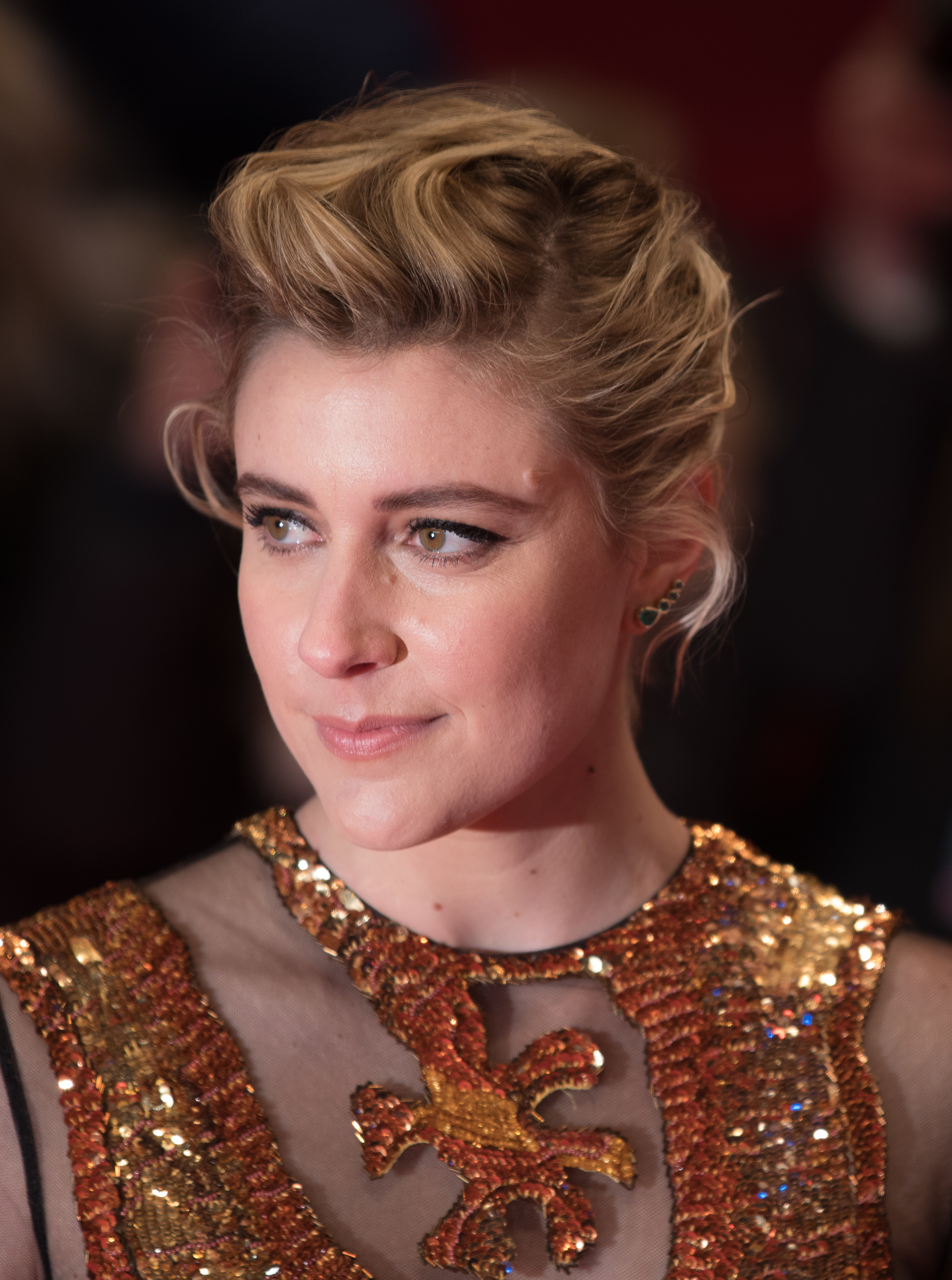
Greta Gerwig, Best Adapted Screenplay winner

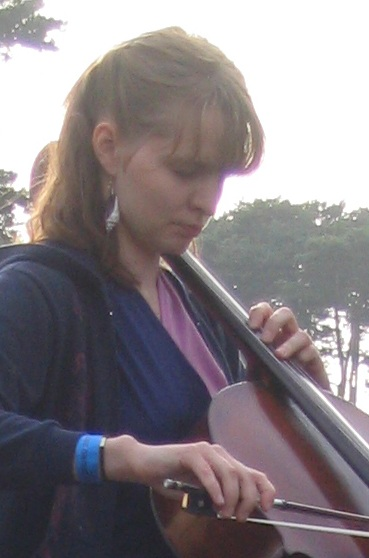
Hildur Guðnadóttir, Best Score winner

Best Picture: Once Upon a Time in Hollywood; 1917; Ford v Ferrari; The Irishman; Jojo Rabbit; Joker; Little Women; Marriage Story; Parasite; Uncut Gems	Best Director: Sam Mendes – 1917 (TIE); Bong Joon-ho – Parasite (TIE); Noah Baumbach – Marriage Story; Greta Gerwig – Little Women; Josh Safdie and Benny Safdie – Uncut Gems; Martin Scorsese – The Irishman; Quentin Tarantino – Once Upon a Time in Hollywood
Best Actor: Joaquin Phoenix – Joker as Arthur Fleck / Joker; Antonio Banderas – Pain and Glory as Salvador Mallo; Robert De Niro – The Irishman as Frank Sheeran; Leonardo DiCaprio – Once Upon a Time in Hollywood as Rick Dalton; Adam Driver – Marriage Story as Charlie Barber; Eddie Murphy – Dolemite Is My Name as Rudy Ray Moore; Adam Sandler – Uncut Gems as Howard Ratner	Best Actress: Renée Zellweger – Judy as Judy Garland; Awkwafina – The Farewell as Billi Wang; Cynthia Erivo – Harriet as Harriet Tubman; Scarlett Johansson – Marriage Story as Nicole Barber; Lupita Nyong'o – Us as Adelaide Wilson / Red; Saoirse Ronan – Little Women as Josephine "Jo" March; Charlize Theron – Bombshell as Megyn Kelly
Best Supporting Actor: Brad Pitt – Once Upon a Time in Hollywood as Cliff Booth; Willem Dafoe – The Lighthouse as Thomas Wake; Tom Hanks – A Beautiful Day in the Neighborhood as Fred Rogers; Anthony Hopkins – The Two Popes as Pope Benedict XVI; Al Pacino – The Irishman as Jimmy Hoffa; Joe Pesci – The Irishman as Russell Bufalino	Best Supporting Actress: Laura Dern – Marriage Story as Nora Fanshaw; Scarlett Johansson – Jojo Rabbit as Rosie Betzler; Jennifer Lopez – Hustlers as Ramona Vega; Florence Pugh – Little Women as Amy March; Margot Robbie – Bombshell as Kayla Pospisil; Zhao Shu-zhen – The Farewell as Nai Nai
Best Young Actor/Actress: Roman Griffin Davis – Jojo Rabbit as Johannes "Jojo" Betzler; Julia Butters – Once Upon a Time in Hollywood as Trudi Frazer; Shahadi Wright Joseph – Us as Zora Wilson / Umbrae; Noah Jupe – Honey Boy as Otis Lort (age 12); Thomasin McKenzie – Jojo Rabbit as Elsa Korr; Archie Yates – Jojo Rabbit as Yorki	Best Acting Ensemble: The Irishman; Bombshell; Knives Out; Little Women; Marriage Story; Once Upon a Time in Hollywood; Parasite
Best Original Screenplay: Quentin Tarantino – Once Upon a Time in Hollywood; Noah Baumbach – Marriage Story; Bong Joon-ho and Han Jin-won – Parasite; Rian Johnson – Knives Out; Lulu Wang – The Farewell	Best Adapted Screenplay: Greta Gerwig – Little Women; Noah Harpster and Micah Fitzerman-Blue – A Beautiful Day in the Neighborhood; Anthony McCarten – The Two Popes; Todd Phillips and Scott Silver – Joker; Taika Waititi – Jojo Rabbit; Steven Zaillian – The Irishman
Best Animated Feature: Toy Story 4; Abominable; Frozen 2; How to Train Your Dragon: The Hidden World; I Lost My Body; Missing Link	Best Action Movie: Avengers: Endgame; 1917; Ford v Ferrari; John Wick: Chapter 3 – Parabellum; Spider-Man: Far From Home
Best Comedy: Dolemite Is My Name; Booksmart; The Farewell; Jojo Rabbit; Knives Out	Best Sci-Fi/Horror Movie: Us; Ad Astra; Avengers: Endgame; Midsommar
Best Cinematography: Roger Deakins – 1917; Jarin Blaschke – The Lighthouse; Phedon Papamichael – Ford v Ferrari; Rodrigo Prieto – The Irishman; Robert Richardson – Once Upon a Time in Hollywood; Lawrence Sher – Joker	Best Editing: Lee Smith – 1917; Ronald Bronstein and Benny Safdie – Uncut Gems; Andrew Buckland and Michael McCusker – Ford v Ferrari; Yang Jin-mo – Parasite; Fred Raskin – Once Upon a Time in Hollywood; Thelma Schoonmaker – The Irishman
Best Costume Design: Ruth E. Carter – Dolemite Is My Name; Julian Day – Rocketman; Jacqueline Durran – Little Women; Arianne Phillips – Once Upon a Time in Hollywood; Sandy Powell and Christopher Peterson – The Irishman; Anna Robbins – Downton Abbey	Best Production Design: Barbara Ling and Nancy Haigh – Once Upon a Time in Hollywood; Mark Friedberg and Kris Moran – Joker; Dennis Gassner and Lee Sandales – 1917; Jess Gonchor and Claire Kaufman – Little Women; Lee Ha-jun – Parasite; Bob Shaw and Regina Graves – The Irishman; Donal Woods and Gina Cromwell – Downton Abbey
Best Score: Hildur Guðnadóttir – Joker; Michael Abels – Us; Alexandre Desplat – Little Women; Randy Newman – Marriage Story; Thomas Newman – 1917; Robbie Robertson – The Irishman	Best Song: "Glasgow (No Place Like Home)" – Wild Rose (TIE); "(I'm Gonna) Love Me Again" – Rocketman (TIE); "I'm Standing With You" – Breakthrough; "Into the Unknown" – Frozen 2; "Speechless" – Aladdin; "Spirit" – The Lion King; "Stand Up" – Harriet
Best Hair and Makeup: Bombshell; Dolemite Is My Name; The Irishman; Joker; Judy; Once Upon a Time in Hollywood; Rocketman	Best Visual Effects: Avengers: Endgame; 1917; Ad Astra; The Aeronauts; Ford v Ferrari; The Irishman; The Lion King
Best Foreign Language Film: Parasite • South Korea; Atlantics • Belgium / France / Senegal; Les Misérables • France; Pain and Glory • Spain; Portrait of a Lady on Fire • France

==== #SeeHer Award ====
- Kristen Bell

==== Lifetime Achievement Award ====
- Eddie Murphy

=== Television ===
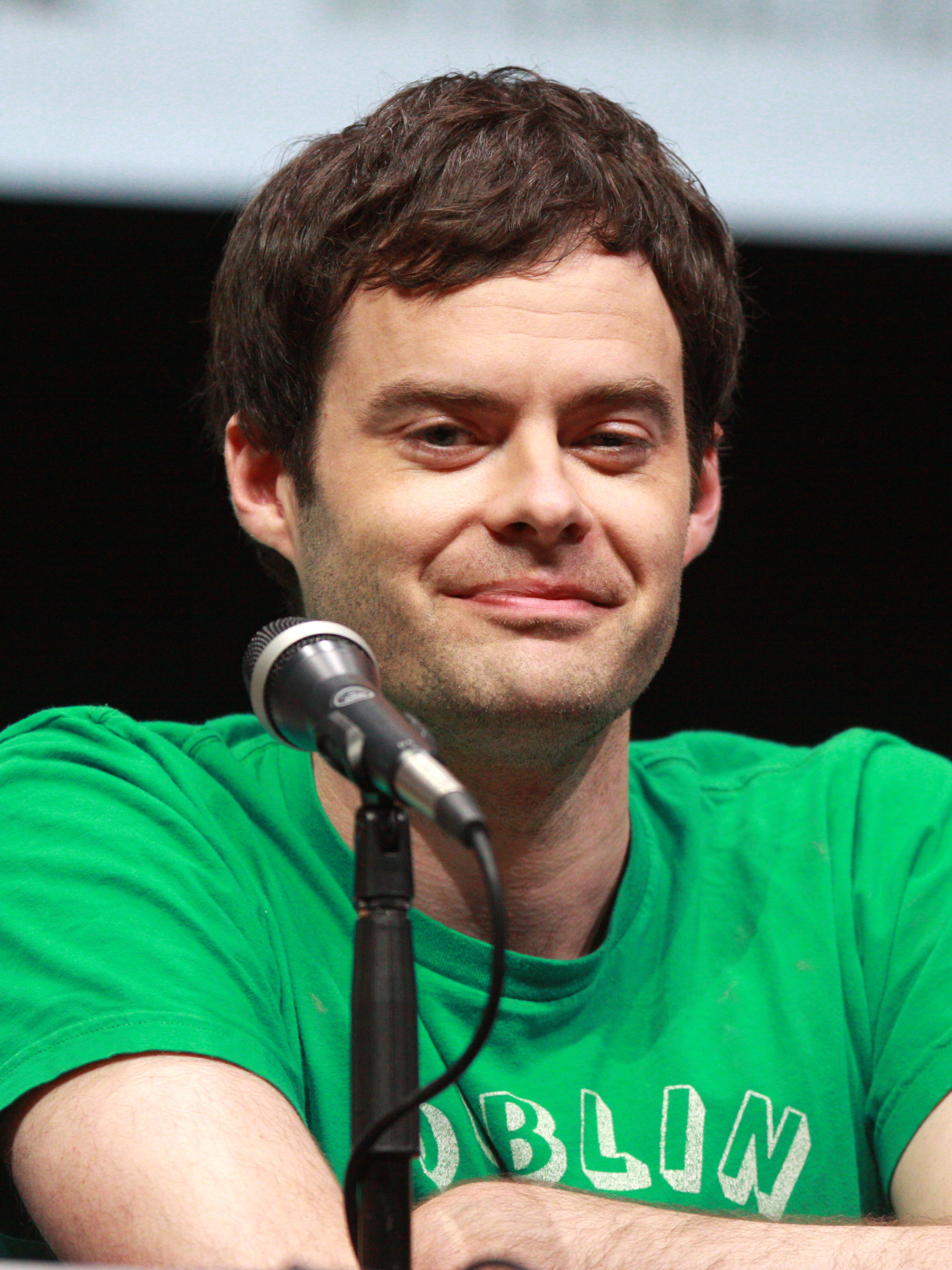
Bill Hader, Best Actor in a Comedy Series winner

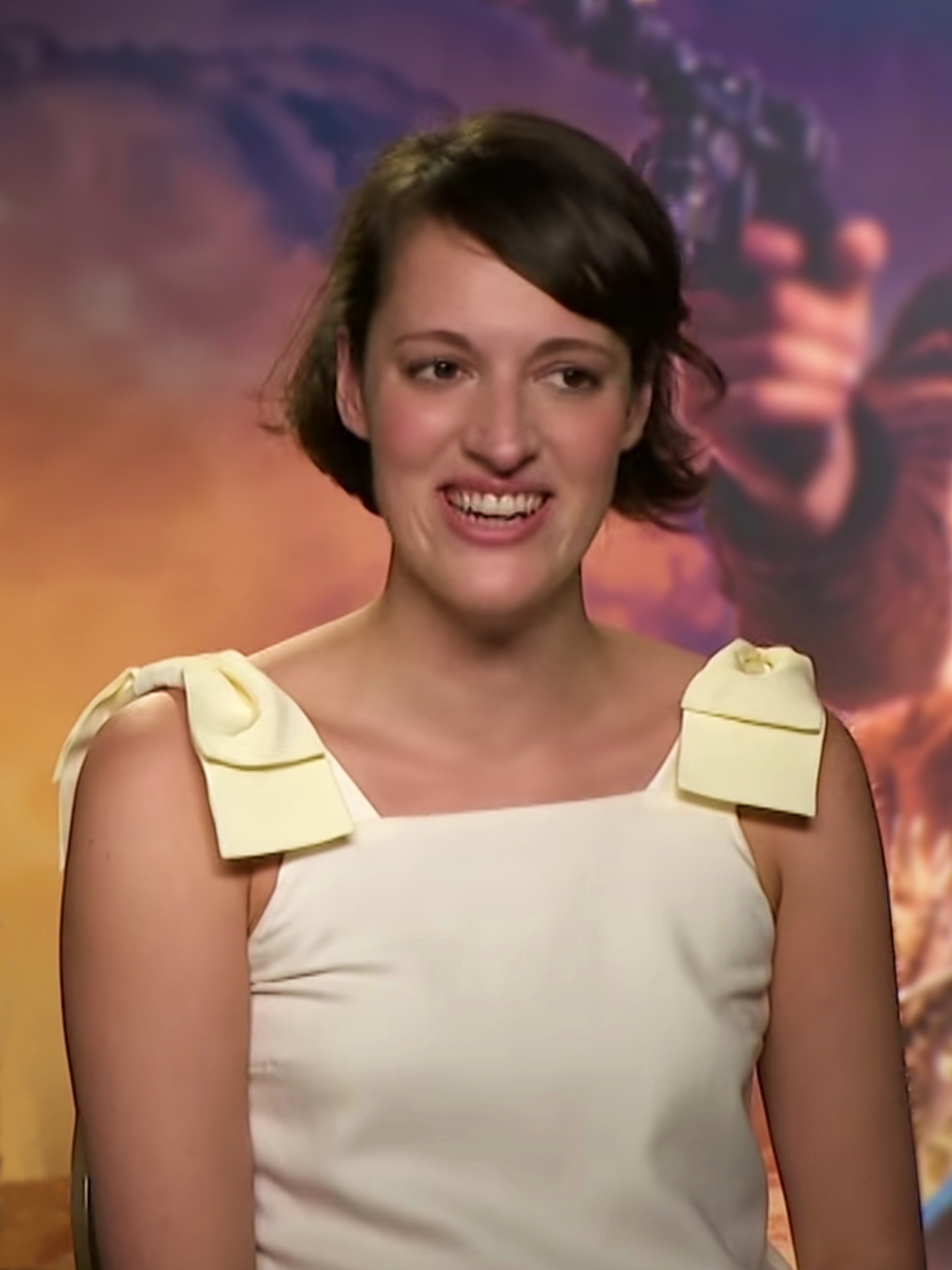
Phoebe Waller-Bridge, Best Actress in a Comedy Series winner

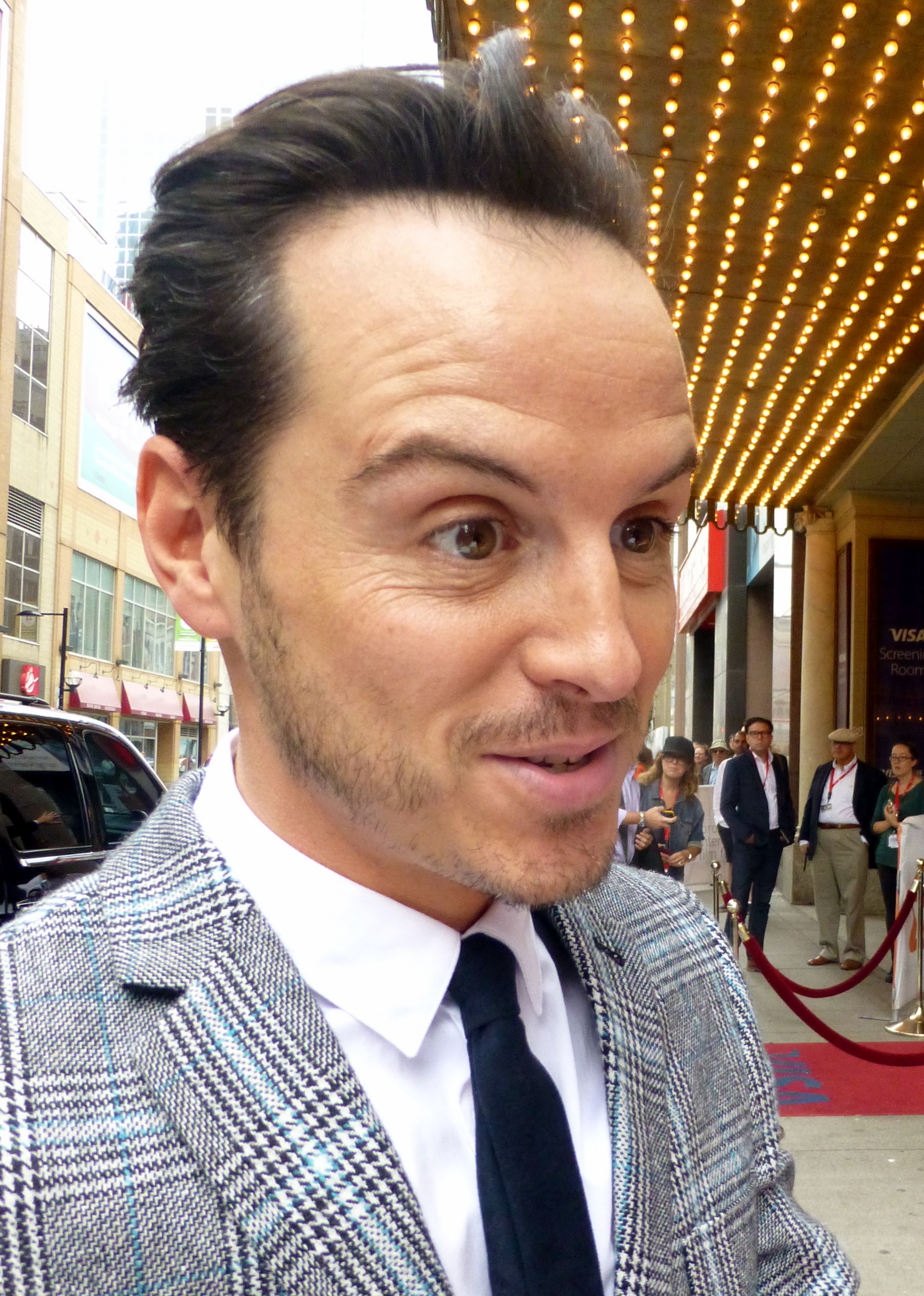
Andrew Scott, Best Supporting Actor in a Comedy Series winner

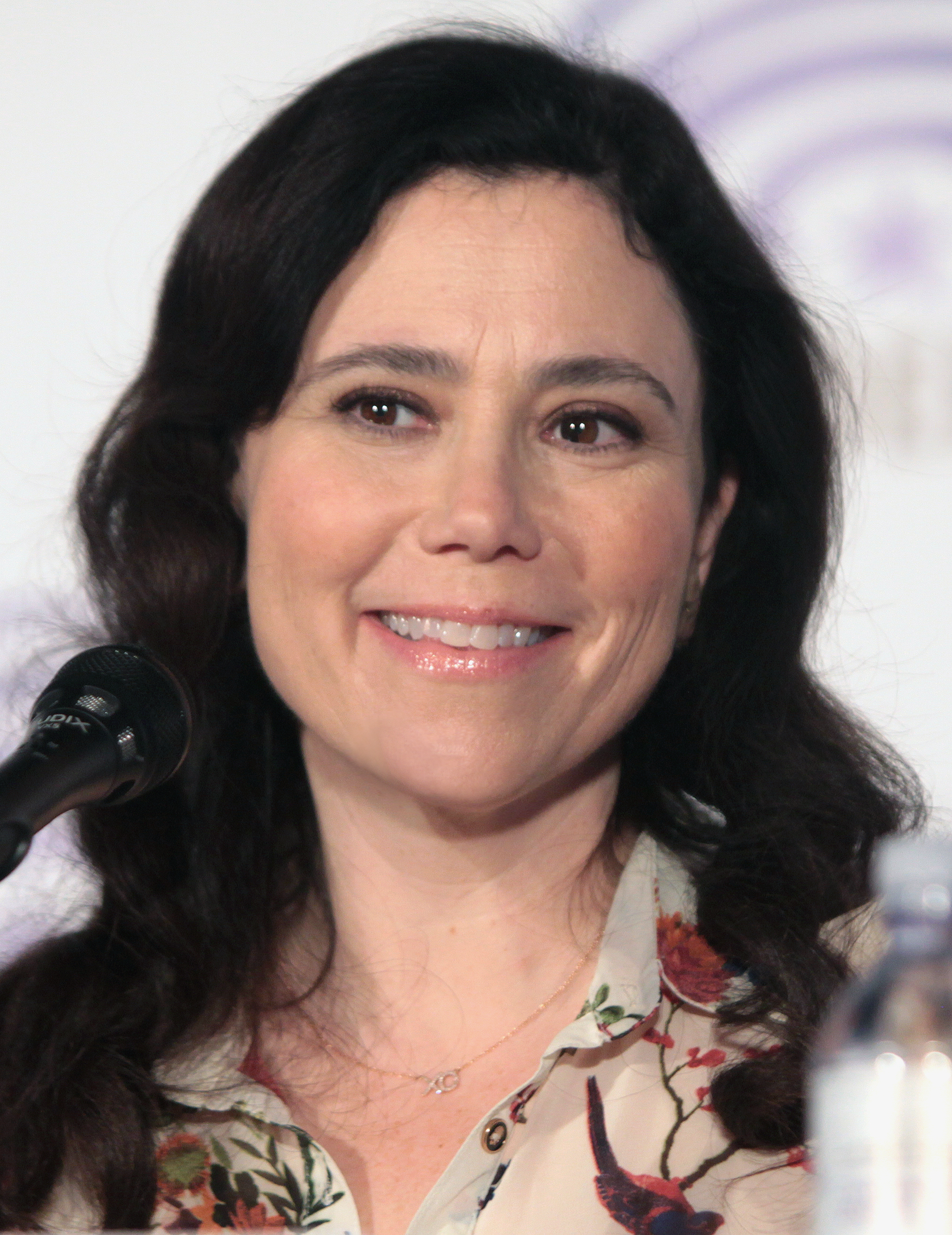
Alex Borstein, Best Supporting Actress in a Comedy Series winner

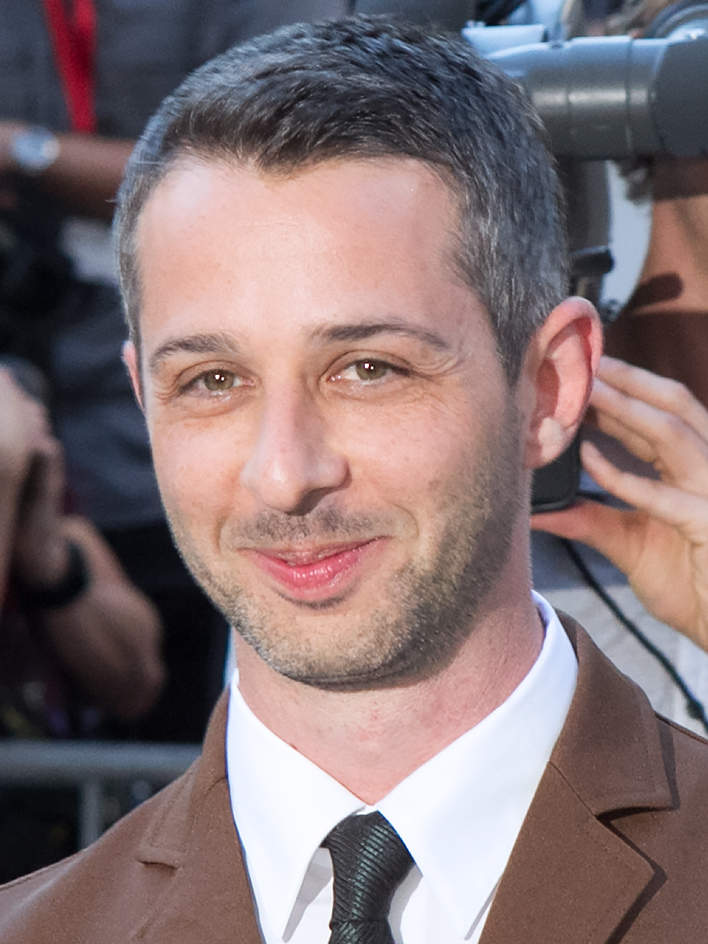
Jeremy Strong, Best Actor in a Drama Series winner

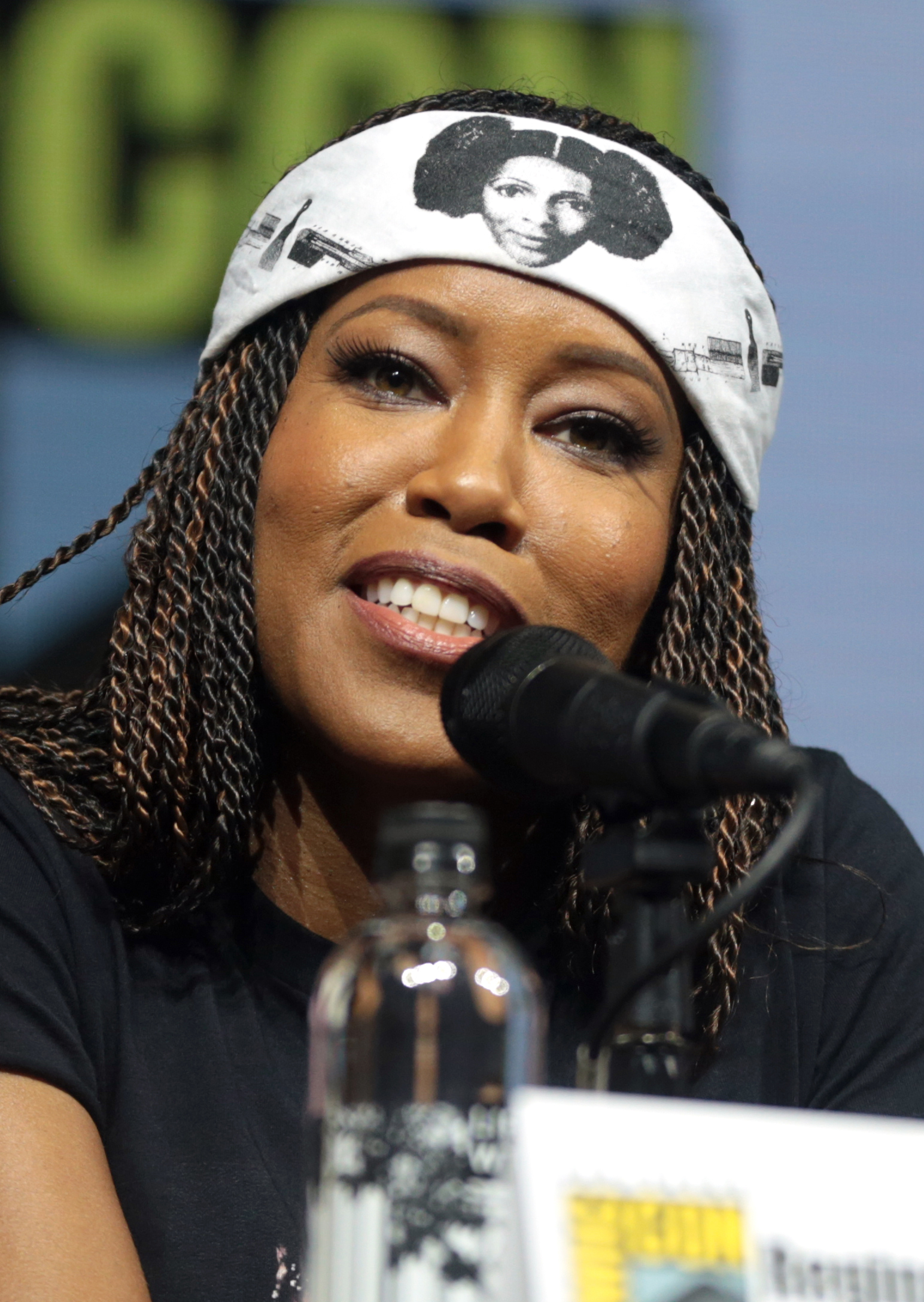
Regina King, Best Actress in a Drama Series winner

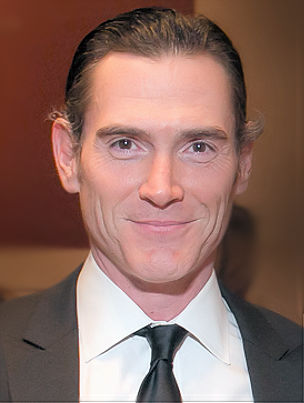
Billy Crudup, Best Supporting Actor in a Drama Series winner

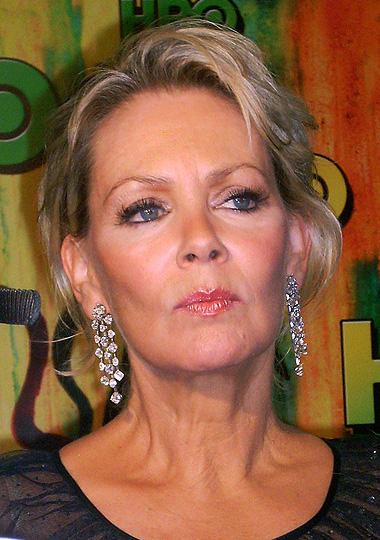
Jean Smart, Best Supporting Actress in a Drama Series winner

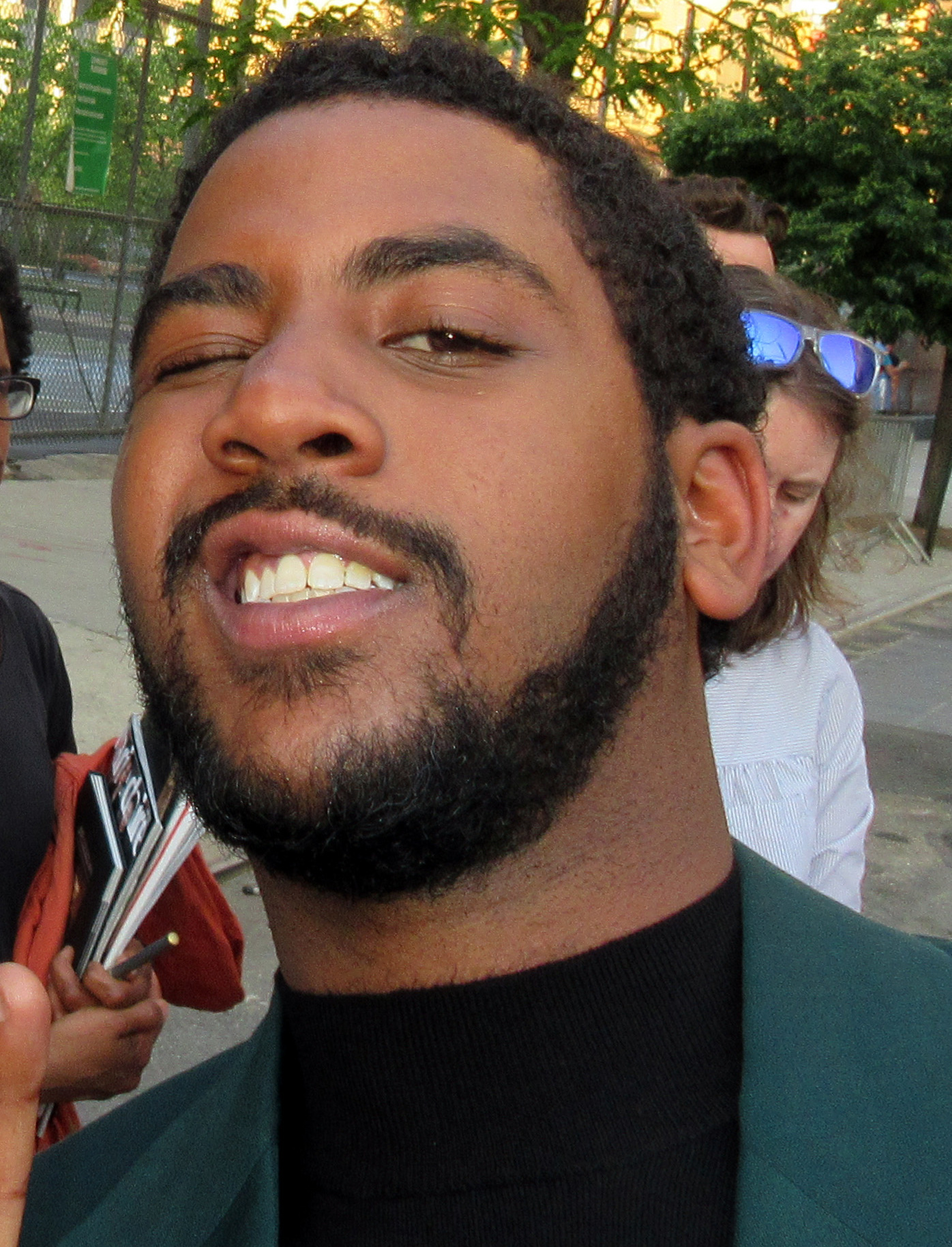
Jharrel Jerome, Best Actor in a Movie/Limited Series winner

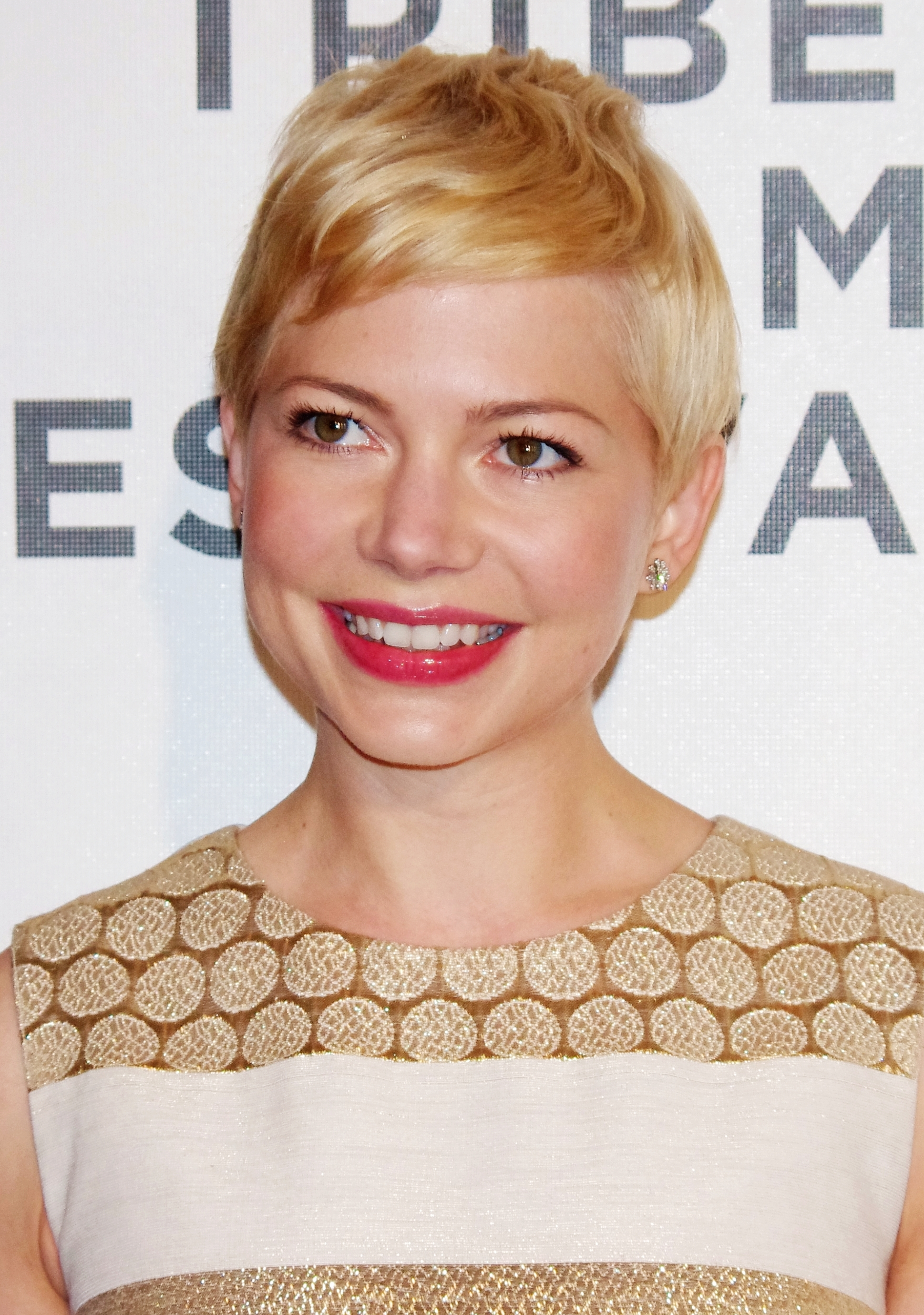
Michelle Williams, Best Actress in a Movie/Limited Series winner

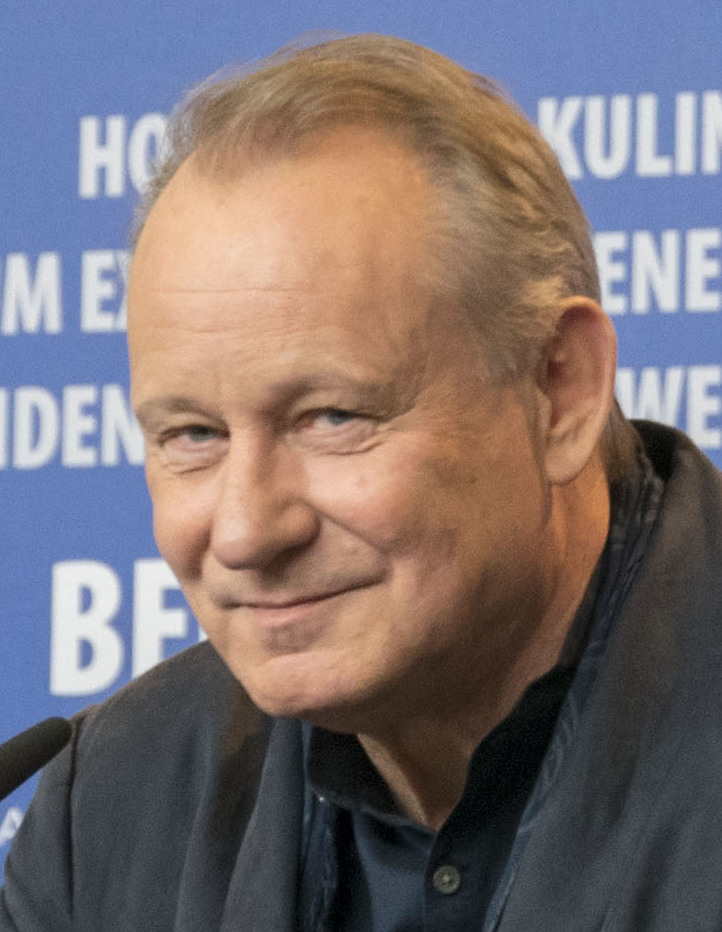
Stellan Skarsgård, Best Supporting Actor in a Movie/Limited Series winner

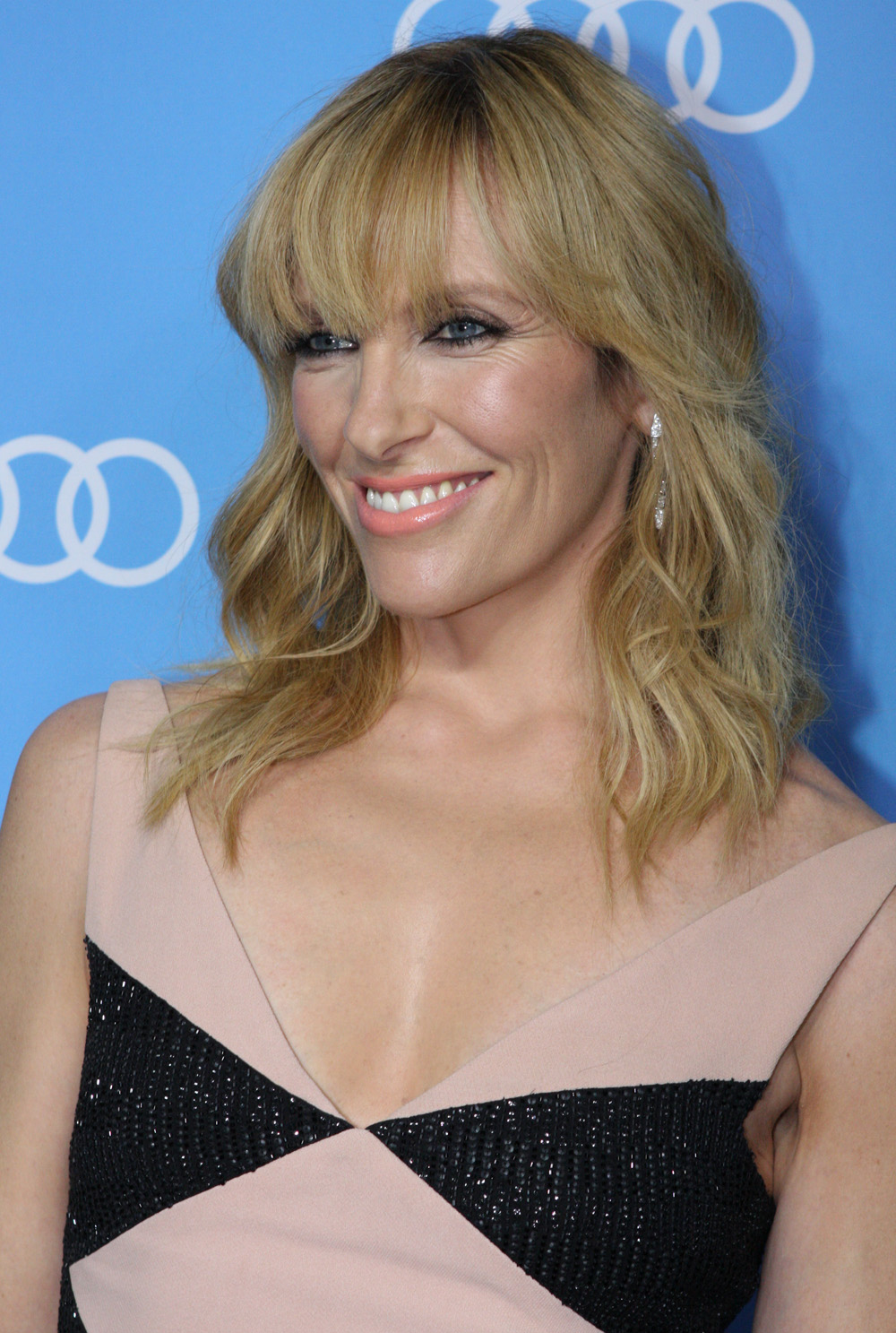
Toni Collette, Best Supporting Actress in a Movie/Limited Series winner

Best Series
Best Comedy Series	Best Drama Series
Fleabag (Amazon Prime Video); Barry (HBO); The Marvelous Mrs. Maisel (Prime Video); Mom (CBS); One Day at a Time (Netflix); PEN15 (Hulu); Schitt's Creek (Pop TV)	Succession (HBO); The Crown (Netflix); David Makes Man (OWN); Game of Thrones (HBO); The Good Fight (CBS All Access); Pose (FX); This Is Us (NBC); Watchmen (HBO)
Best Limited Series	Best TV Movie
When They See Us (Netflix); Catch-22 (Hulu); Chernobyl (HBO); Fosse/Verdon (FX); The Loudest Voice (Showtime); Unbelievable (Netflix); Years and Years (HBO)	El Camino: A Breaking Bad Movie (Netflix); Brexit (HBO); Deadwood: The Movie (HBO); Guava Island (Prime Video); Native Son (HBO); Patsy & Loretta (Lifetime)
Best Animated Series	Best Talk Show
BoJack Horseman (Netflix); Big Mouth (Netflix); Family Guy (Fox); She-Ra and the Princesses of Power (Netflix); The Simpsons (Fox); Undone (Prime Video)	The Late Late Show with James Corden (CBS) (TIE); Late Night with Seth Meyers (NBC) (TIE); Desus & Mero (Showtime); Full Frontal with Samantha Bee (TBS); The Kelly Clarkson Show (NBC); Last Week Tonight with John Oliver (HBO)
Best Comedy Special
Live in Front of a Studio Audience: Norman Lear's All in the Family and The Jeffersons (ABC); Amy Schumer: Growing (Netflix); Jenny Slate: Stage Fright (Netflix); Ramy Youssef: Feelings (HBO); Seth Meyers: Lobby Baby (Netflix); Trevor Noah: Son of Patricia (Netflix); Wanda Sykes: Not Normal (Netflix)
Best Acting in a Comedy Series
Best Actor	Best Actress
Bill Hader – Barry as Barry Berkman / Barry Block; Ted Danson – The Good Place as Michael; Walton Goggins – The Unicorn as Wade; Eugene Levy – Schitt's Creek as Johnny Rose; Paul Rudd – Living with Yourself as Miles Elliot / Miles Elliot Clone; Bashir Salahuddin – Sherman's Showcase as Sherman McDaniel; Ramy Youssef – Ramy as Ramy Hassan	Phoebe Waller-Bridge – Fleabag as Fleabag; Christina Applegate – Dead to Me as Jen Harding; Alison Brie – GLOW as Ruth "Zoya the Destroya" Wilder; Rachel Brosnahan – The Marvelous Mrs. Maisel as Miriam "Midge" Maisel; Kirsten Dunst – On Becoming a God in Central Florida as Krystal Stubbs; Allison Janney – Mom as Bonnie Plunkett; Julia Louis-Dreyfus – Veep as Selina Meyer; Catherine O'Hara – Schitt's Creek as Moira Rose
Best Supporting Actor	Best Supporting Actress
Andrew Scott – Fleabag as The Priest; Andre Braugher – Brooklyn Nine-Nine as Captain Raymond Holt; Anthony Carrigan – Barry as NoHo Hank; William Jackson Harper – The Good Place as Chidi Anagonye; Dan Levy – Schitt's Creek as David Rose; Nico Santos – Superstore as Mateo Fernando Aquino Liwanag; Henry Winkler – Barry as Gene Cousineau	Alex Borstein – The Marvelous Mrs. Maisel as Susie Myerson; D'Arcy Carden – The Good Place as Janet; Sian Clifford – Fleabag as Claire; Betty Gilpin – GLOW as Debbie "Liberty Belle" Eagan; Rita Moreno – One Day at a Time as Lydia Riera; Annie Murphy – Schitt's Creek as Alexis Rose; Molly Shannon – The Other Two as Pat Dubek
Best Acting in a Drama Series
Best Actor	Best Actress
Jeremy Strong – Succession as Kendall Roy; Sterling K. Brown – This Is Us as Randall Pearson; Mike Colter – Evil as David Acosta; Paul Giamatti – Billions as Charles "Chuck" Rhoades Jr.; Kit Harington – Game of Thrones as Jon Snow; Freddie Highmore – The Good Doctor as Dr. Shaun Murphy; Tobias Menzies – The Crown as Prince Philip, Duke of Edinburgh; Billy Porter – Pose as Pray Tell	Regina King – Watchmen as Angela Abar / Sister Night; Christine Baranski – The Good Fight as Diane Lockhart; Olivia Colman – The Crown as Queen Elizabeth II; Jodie Comer – Killing Eve as Villanelle / Oksana Astankova; Nicole Kidman – Big Little Lies as Celeste Wright; Michaela Jaé Rodriguez – Pose as Blanca Rodriguez-Evangelista; Sarah Snook – Succession as Siobhan "Shiv" Roy; Zendaya – Euphoria as Rue Bennett
Best Supporting Actor	Best Supporting Actress
Billy Crudup – The Morning Show as Cory Ellison; Asante Blackk – This Is Us as Malik Hodges; Asia Kate Dillon – Billions as Taylor Amber Mason; Peter Dinklage – Game of Thrones as Tyrion Lannister; Justin Hartley – This Is Us as Kevin Pearson; Delroy Lindo – The Good Fight as Adrian Boseman; Tim Blake Nelson – Watchmen as Wade Tillman / Looking Glass	Jean Smart – Watchmen as Laurie Blake; Helena Bonham Carter – The Crown as Princess Margaret; Gwendoline Christie – Game of Thrones as Brienne of Tarth; Laura Dern – Big Little Lies as Renata Klein; Audra McDonald – The Good Fight as Liz Lawrence; Meryl Streep – Big Little Lies as Mary Louise Wright; Susan Kelechi Watson – This Is Us as Beth Pearson
Best Acting in a Movie/Limited Series
Best Actor	Best Actress
Jharrel Jerome – When They See Us as Korey Wise; Christopher Abbott – Catch-22 as Capt. John Yossarian; Mahershala Ali – True Detective as Wayne Hays; Russell Crowe – The Loudest Voice as Roger Ailes; Jared Harris – Chernobyl as Valery Legasov; Sam Rockwell – Fosse/Verdon as Bob Fosse; Noah Wyle – The Red Line as Daniel Calder	Michelle Williams – Fosse/Verdon as Gwen Verdon; Kaitlyn Dever – Unbelievable as Marie Adler; Anne Hathaway – Modern Love as Lexi; Megan Hilty – Patsy & Loretta as Patsy Cline; Joey King – The Act as Gypsy Blanchard; Jessie Mueller – Patsy & Loretta as Loretta Lynn; Merritt Wever – Unbelievable as Det. Karen Duvall
Best Supporting Actor	Best Supporting Actress
Stellan Skarsgård – Chernobyl as Boris Shcherbina; Asante Blackk – When They See Us as Kevin Richardson; George Clooney – Catch-22 as Scheisskopf; John Leguizamo – When They See Us as Raymond Santana Sr.; Dev Patel – Modern Love as Joshua; Jesse Plemons – El Camino: A Breaking Bad Movie as Todd Alquist; Russell Tovey – Years and Years as Daniel Lyons	Toni Collette – Unbelievable as Det. Grace Rasmussen; Patricia Arquette – The Act as Dee Dee Blanchard; Marsha Stephanie Blake – When They See Us as Linda McCray; Niecy Nash – When They See Us as Delores Wise; Margaret Qualley – Fosse/Verdon as Ann Reinking; Emma Thompson – Years and Years as Vivienne Rook MP; Emily Watson – Chernobyl as Ulana Khomyuk

== Films with multiple nominations and wins ==
The following twenty-seven films received multiple nominations:

Film	Nominations
The Irishman	14
Once Upon a Time in Hollywood	12
Little Women	9
Marriage Story	8
1917	8
Jojo Rabbit	7
Joker	7
Parasite	7
Ford v Ferrari	5
Bombshell	4
Dolemite Is My Name	4
The Farewell	4
Uncut Gems	4
Us	4
Avengers: Endgame	3
Knives Out	3
Rocketman	3
Ad Astra	2
A Beautiful Day in the Neighborhood	2
Downton Abbey	2
Frozen II	2
Harriet	2
Judy	2
The Lighthouse	2
The Lion King	2
Pain and Glory	2
The Two Popes	2

The following six films received multiple awards:

Film	Wins
Once Upon a Time in Hollywood	4
1917	3
Avengers: Endgame	2
Dolemite Is My Name	2
Joker	2
Parasite	2

== Television programs with multiple nominations and wins ==
The following programs received multiple nominations:

Program	Network	Category	Nominations
When They See Us	Netflix	Limited	6
Schitt's Creek	Pop TV	Comedy	5
This Is Us	NBC	Drama	5
Barry	HBO	Comedy	4
Chernobyl	HBO	Limited	4
The Crown	Netflix	Drama	4
Fleabag	Amazon Prime Video	Comedy	4
Fosse/Verdon	FX	Limited	4
Game of Thrones	HBO	Drama	4
The Good Fight	CBS All Access	Drama	4
Unbelievable	Netflix	Limited	4
Watchmen	HBO	Drama	4
Big Little Lies (Note: Previously categorized as Limited)	HBO	Drama	3
Catch-22	Hulu	Limited	3
The Good Place	NBC	Comedy	3
The Marvelous Mrs. Maisel	Amazon Prime Video	Comedy	3
Patsy & Loretta	Lifetime	Movie	3
Pose	FX	Drama	3
Succession	HBO	Drama	3
Years and Years	HBO	Limited	3
The Act	Hulu	Limited	2
Billions	Showtime	Drama	2
El Camino: A Breaking Bad Movie	Netflix	Movie	2
GLOW	Netflix	Comedy	2
The Loudest Voice	Showtime	Limited	2
Modern Love	Amazon Prime Video	Limited	2
One Day at a Time	Netflix	Comedy	2

The following programs received multiple awards:

Program	Network	Category	Wins
Fleabag	Amazon Prime Video	Comedy	3
Succession	HBO	Drama	2
Watchmen	HBO	Drama	2
When They See Us	Netflix	Limited	2
