= Jameson Brooks =

American writer

Jameson Brooks is an American director, writer, and visual effects artist, best known for directing the 2018 film Bomb City, based on the true crime story of punk rocker Brian Deneke.

== Early life ==
Brooks grew up in Amarillo, Texas. Brooks went to film school at the University of North Texas.

== Career ==
Brooks' filmmaking career began when he purchased his first camcorder at age 16 and then filming his friends skateboard and BMX. After a few years of his work both behind the camera and on his bicycle, he started to appear in national television outlets that had shows featuring Action Sports, specifically Scarred, Blue Torch, and Shook Interactive Video Zine.

Brooks co-owns the production company 3rd Identity.
