= Dave Davis (actor) =

American actor (born 1989)

- Born: David Randolph Davis; June 7, 1989 (age 36); Princeton, New Jersey, U.S.
- Education: Tulane University (BFA)
- Occupation: Actor

Dave Davis (born June 7, 1989) is an American actor, musician and producer based in New Orleans. He is best known for his lead roles in the 2017 film Bomb City and the 2019 horror film The Vigil.

== Early life and education ==
Davis was born on June 7, 1989 in Princeton, New Jersey, into a Jewish family. He grew up in New Orleans and had his Bar Mitzvah at Touro Synagogue. He appeared in various productions as a child and attended summer courses in theatre. He graduated from the Lawrenceville School in 2007 following Hurricane Katrina, then earned a Bachelor of Fine Arts in theatre from Tulane University in 2011. In fulfillment of his thesis, he starred in Kenneth Lonergan's This Is Our Youth.

== Career ==
Davis spent five years with the New Orleans Shakespeare Festival, culminating with the role of Hamlet in 2012. After graduation, he worked out of New Orleans, appearing in films including Ghost Shark, Red Clover, Ozark Sharks, and several others. He also guest starred in True Detective and The Walking Dead, and acted in The Big Short and Logan. For several years, Davis was a member of the comedy group Bare Handed Bear Handlers, releasing a web miniseries, short films, and a number of music videos. In 2015, he moved to Los Angeles, where he continued to work with the comedy group from afar.

In 2017, Davis played the lead role in Bomb City, a film about the life and murder of Brian Deneke. This earned him a Best Actor award and the Special Jury Prize for Performance at the 2017 Nashville Film Festival, followed by a second Best Actor award at the Louisville International Festival of Film. Director Keith Thomas chose him to play the lead in his 2019 horror film The Vigil after seeing him in Bomb City. He played a man tasked with watching over a deceased member of an Orthodox Jewish community. He was nominated for Best Actor in a Horror Movie at the 2nd Critics' Choice Super Awards. Davis returned to New Orleans permanently during the COVID-19 pandemic.

In 2025, he appeared in and was executive producer of the film Hazard.

== Filmography ==
=== Film ===
Year	Title	Role	Notes	Ref
2007	Flakes	Stoner #1	Uncredited	
2012	Stolen	Taylor		
2014	Elsa & Fred	Photographer		
2014	Starve	Jiminey		
2015	The Final Girls	50's Counselor		
2015	Demonic	Tech 1		
2015	Get Hard	Cross Dresser		
2015	N.O.L.A Circus	Vinny		
2015	Nocturna	Bobby		
2015	The Big Short	Burry's Assistant		
2015	Daddy's Home	Panda Singer #1		
2016	The Backup Dancer	Rudy	Uncredited	
2017	Logan	Convenience Store Clerk		
2017	Bomb City	Brian Deneke	Won two Best Actor awards and one Special Jury Prize for Performance	
2017	Dark Meridian	Tevi Marek		
2017	Jeepers Creepers 3	SWAT Team One		
2018	Laundry Day	Ethan		
2018	The Domestics	Flame Gambler		
2019	The Vigil	Yakov Ronen	Nominated for Best Actor in a Horror Movie at the 2nd Critics' Choice Super Awards	
2019	The True Don Quixote	Trout		
2019	Sunday Girl	Jack		
2020	Greyhound	Boatswain's Mate #1		
2022	Emancipation	Oliver		
2022	Presence	David	Co-producer	
2023	Resurrected	Father Stanley Martin	Associate producer	
2023	Renfield	Mitch		
2025	Hazard	John Lang	Post-production; Executive Producer	

=== Television ===
Year	Title	Role	Notes	Ref
2011	Memphis Beat	Bryan	Episode: "The Things We Carry"	
2011	Hide	Young Charlie Marvin	TV movie	
2012	Red Clover	Dax Spence	TV movie	
2012	American Horror House	Lloyd	TV movie	
2012	The Walking Dead	Gargulio	Episode: "Hounded"	
2013	Heebie Jeebies	Mace	TV movie	
2013	Ladies' Man: A Made Movie	Toby Miller	TV movie	
2013	Ghost Shark	Blaise	TV movie	
2014	True Detective	Toby	Episode: "After You've Gone"	
2014	SnakeHead Swamp	Chris	TV movie	
2016	NCIS: New Orleans	JJ Taylor	Episode: "Help Wanted"	
2016	Ozark Sharks	Harrison	TV movie	
2018	Bad Stepmother	Jonathan Hawking	TV movie	
2019	Lucifer	Maury Novak	Episode: "Somebody's Been Reading Dante's Inferno"	
2021	The Rookie	Marvin Reynolds	Episode: "Hit and Run"	
2023	Tiny Beautiful Things	Pablo	Episode: "The Ghost Ship"	
2024	S.W.A.T.	Jeremiah Jacobs	Episode: "Left of Boom"	
2025	The Greatest	Marvin Geller	5 episodes	
