= Patsy & Loretta =

2019 film by Callie Khouri

- Promotional poster
- Written by: Angelina Burnett
- Directed by: Callie Khouri
- Starring: Megan Hilty; Jessie Mueller; Kyle Schmid; Janine Turner; Joe Tippett
- Composer: Tim Lauer
- Country of origin: United States
- Original language: English

Production
- Executive producers: Neil Meron; Callie Khouri; Mark Nicholson
- Producer: Michael Lohmann
- Cinematography: Michael Lohmann
- Editor: Scott Vickrey
- Running time: 87 minutes
- Production company: Sony Pictures Television

Original release
- Network: Lifetime
- Release: October 19, 2019

Patsy & Loretta is a 2019 biographical drama television film directed by Callie Khouri. The screenplay by Angelina Burnett is based on the friendship between country singers Patsy Cline and Loretta Lynn. The cast is led by Megan Hilty, Jessie Mueller, Janine Turner, and Kyle Schmid.

The film first aired on Lifetime on October 19, 2019. The film was nominated for Best Movie at the 10th Critics' Choice Television Awards. Megan Hilty and Jessie Mueller were also both nominated for Best Actress in a TV Movie.

== Plot ==
Country singers Patsy Cline (Megan Hilty) and Loretta Lynn (Jessie Mueller) meet when the former was already a well known star. The film starts in 1957, showing the two singers in their separate lives each with their own families.

They meet in 1961 after Patsy was hospitalized due to a serious automobile accident. Already a star, Patsy helped Loretta, who was just starting in her career, giving advice on contracts and even gave her tips on costumes and makeup. They develop a friendship, until the fatal airplane crash in 1963.

Loretta is seen several years later in performance with the "ghost" of Patsy.

== Cast ==
- Megan Hilty as Patsy Cline
- Jessie Mueller as Loretta Lynn
- Kyle Schmid as Charlie Dick, Patsy's second husband.
- Janine Turner as Hilda Hensley
- Joe Tippett as Doolittle "Mooney" Lynn, Loretta's husband.
- Billy Slaughter as Randy Hughes, Patsy Cline's manager.
- Justice Leak as Doyle Wilburn
- Jason Loughlin as Teddy Wilburn
- Jane McNeill as Whiskey Soaked Lady
- Jeremy Childs as Lamar Sneed
- Wynn Everett as Janette Davis
- Natalie Renee Long as Dottie West
- Jenny Leigh as Jan Howard
- Erin Beute as June Carter
- Jake Etheridge as Bill West

== Production ==
The film was shot in Nashville, Tennessee. The executive producer, Neil Meron, had also worked with Hilty on the TV series Smash in 2012-13. Co-producers were Loretta Lynn's daughter Patsy Lynn Russell and Patsy Cline's daughter Julie Fudge on behalf of Patsy Cline's Estate. Megan Hilty and Jessie Mueller were cast in the lead roles.

== Reception ==
Matt Roush wrote that the film is a "...brisk, sweet, touching and, naturally, tuneful tribute to female friendship... Megan Hilty ... gives a wonderfully robust performance as the outspoken and driven Patsy... It's inspiring and terrifically enjoyable watching Patsy, a force of musical nature, take the less worldly Loretta under her wing.... Still, the movie can be a bit sketchy as it races through their professional and personal lives."
