= Michael Papajohn =

American actor

- Born: Vestavia Hills, Birmingham, Alabama, U.S.
- Occupations: Actor, stuntman
- Years active: 1988–present
- Children: 1

Michael Papajohn is an American character actor, stuntman and former college baseball player for the LSU Tigers baseball team. He played Dennis Carradine in Sam Raimi's Spider-Man trilogy.

== Early life ==
Papajohn was born and raised in Vestavia Hills, a suburb of Birmingham, Alabama, to a Greek American family. He graduated from Vestavia Hills High School in 1983 and went on to play for two years at Gulf Coast Community College in Panama City, Florida. He was drafted by the Texas Rangers in the 1985 Major League Baseball draft. Instead of signing a contract, he accepted a baseball scholarship to Louisiana State University in Baton Rouge, Louisiana.

== College career ==
Nicknamed “Poppy”, Papajohn was an outfielder for Skip Bertman's LSU Tigers. He was named to the Southeastern Conference's 1986 baseball tournament All-Tournament Team. Papajohn, along with teammates Mark Guthrie, Joey Belle, Jeff Reboulet, Jeff Yurtin, Jack Voigt and Barry Manuel, helped LSU make its first appearance in the College World Series in 1986.

== Acting career ==
Papajohn got his start in acting while he was a student at Louisiana State University. Already an athlete, he was hired to be a stunt performer in the film Everybody's All-American which was being filmed on the campus of LSU and featured football action sequences filmed during LSU football games in Tiger Stadium. From there he moved on to being a stunt performer in films such as Money Talks and Starship Troopers and acting in films like Predator 2, For Love of the Game, where he plays New York Yankees slugger Sam Tuttle, and Spider-Man and Spider-Man 3, in which he plays Dennis Carradine, the robber who was thought to have killed Uncle Ben with a pistol; Papajohn also makes a cameo appearance as a different character in the film series' reboot, The Amazing Spider-Man. He has also starred in Terminator 3: Rise of the Machines, Transformers: Revenge of the Fallen, Terminator Salvation, S.W.A.T., Land of the Lost, G-Force in 2009,The Assault and Jeepers Creepers 3 in 2017.

== Filmography ==
- 1988: Everybody's All-American as Unknown
- 1990: Predator 2 as Subway Gang
- 1991: The Last Boy Scout as Hitman
- 1992: The Babe as Heckler
- 1992: Mr. Baseball as Rick
- 1994: Little Big League as Tucker Kain
- 1995: Dominion as John
- 1995: The Indian in the Cupboard as a Cardassian
- 1995: Wild Bill as Extra (uncredited)
- 1996: Naked Souls as Driver
- 1996: Eraser as CIA Agent Schiffer
- 1997: Spawn as Glen, Zack's Dad
- 1998: My Giant as Tough Guy #1
- 1998: The Waterboy as Unknown
- 1999: Inferno as Creep
- 1999: For Love of the Game as Sam Tuttle
- 2000: Charlie's Angels as Bathroom Thug
- 2000: The Patriot of America as Payne (voice)
- 2001: The Animal as Patrolman Brady
- 2001: Rustin as Trent Cotee
- 2002: Whacked as Shannon
- 2002: Spider-Man as Carjacker
- 2002: The Hot Chick as Security Guard
- 2003: A Man Apart as Fake Uniformed Cop (uncredited)
- 2003: Hulk as Technician #5
- 2003: Terminator 3: Rise of the Machines as Paramedic #1
- 2003: S.W.A.T. as Bistro Gangster #3
- 2003: House of Sand and Fog as Carpenter
- 2004: The Last Shot as Ed Rossi Jr.
- 2005: The Longest Yard as Guard Papajohn
- 2005: Domino as Cigliutti Goon (uncredited)
- 2006: Larry the Cable Guy: Health Inspector as Diner Manager
- 2006: How to Go Out on a Date in Queens as Man at Table
- 2007: Spider-Man 3 as Dennis Carradine/Carjacker
- 2007: Delta Farce as Bill's Neighbor
- 2007: Live Free or Die Hard as Gabriel's Henchman (uncredited)
- 2007: I Know Who Killed Me as Jacob K. / Joseph K.
- 2008: Superhero Movie as Robber, 'Gimme Your Wallet'
- 2008: Yes Man as Security Guard (uncredited)
- 2009: Terminator Salvation as Carnahan
- 2009: Land of the Lost as Astronaut (uncredited)
- 2009: Transformers: Revenge of the Fallen as Colin 'Cal' Banes
- 2009: G-Force as FBI Techie
- 2010: Jonah Hex as Saber Guard
- 2010: The Assault as Pillot
- 2011: Drive Angry as Tattooed Cult Member
- 2011: The Hit List as FBI Special Agent Drake Ford
- 2012: This Means War as German Goon
- 2012: For the Love of Money as Little Guy
- 2012: The Amazing Spider-Man as Alfie (uncredited)
- 2012: The Dark Knight Rises as Prison Guard (uncredited)
- 2012: The Bourne Legacy as CIA Agent Larry
- 2012: Gangster Squad as Mike 'The Flea'
- 2013: Pawn Shop Chronicles as Spectator #1
- 2013: Bering Sea Beast as Jonas
- 2013: Escape Plan as Prisoner Beaten by Breslin
- 2013: Homefront as Hitman #4
- 2013–2015: Banshee as Delmont Munson, Bald Thug
- 2014: Devil's Due as Officer Miska
- 2014: Rage as Vory
- 2014: Dawn of the Planet of the Apes as Cannon-Gunner
- 2014: Get On Up as 1949 Cop
- 2014: Nightcrawler as Security Guard
- 2014: Selma as Major John Cloud
- 2015: Wild Card as Pit Boss
- 2015: Jurassic World as InGen Contractor
- 2015: American Ultra as Otis
- 2015: Nocturna as Lonny
- 2016: My Many Sons as Pete's Dad
- 2016: Cold Moon as Ed Gieger
- 2016: Ozark Sharks as Rick
- 2016: Jack Reacher: Never Go Back as DC Policeman at Restaurant
- 2016: Live by Night as Maso's Crew (uncredited)
- 2017: Reborn as Dyson
- 2017: Vengeance: A Love Story as J.J. Breen
- 2017: Jeepers Creepers 3 as Frank
- 2019: Welcome to Acapulco as Apex
- 2019: Black and Blue as Sergeant Leader
- 2020: Walkaway Walk as Coach Manny
- 2020: Unhinged as Homer
- 2023: Big George Foreman as Officer Dell
- 2023: The Iron Claw as Olympic Coach
- 2024: Madame Web as The Burglar (uncredited)
- 2025: On the Grid as Sheriff
