= Billy Slaughter =

American film and television actor (born 1980)

- Slaughter in 2026
- Born: William H. Slaughter; June 3, 1980 (age 46); New Orleans, Louisiana, U.S.
- Occupation: Actor
- Years active: 2002–present

William H. Slaughter is an American film and television actor, best known for his roles in The Big Short, The Magnificent Seven, The Campaign, Netflix's Mindhunter, Anne Rice's Mayfair Witches, and Marvel's Cloak & Dagger. He starred in films such as Mysterious Circumstance, which won the "Best Picture" award at the Los Angeles Film Awards (2022).

== Early life ==
Slaughter was born on June 3, 1980, in New Orleans, Louisiana. He attended Jesuit High School in New Orleans. After getting his acting degree, he was selected to stand-in for Dustin Hoffman on the John Grisham film, Runaway Jury. Hoffman then invited Slaughter to move to Los Angeles, where he would work from 2002–2005 as Hoffman's permanent stand-in. Slaughter graduated in Drama and Communications from the University of New Orleans. He has been trained at the British American Drama Academy (BADA).

== Career ==
In 2011, Slaughter played Ryan in the action film Colombiana opposite Zoe Saldaña, the film was directed by Olivier Megaton and released domestically by TriStar Pictures on August 26, 2011.

In 2012, Slaughter played the role of Dermot in the political comedy film The Campaign along with Will Ferrell and Zach Galifianakis. The film was directed by Jay Roach and released by Warner Bros. Pictures on August 10, 2012.

In 2013, Slaughter played the role of an Ohio State Fair Security Guard named Ben in the crime thriller Parker along with Jason Statham and Jennifer Lopez. The film was directed by Taylor Hackford and released on January 25, 2013, by FilmDistrict. Later he played the role of Trevor 'The Fed' in the thriller The East opposite Brit Marling, Alexander Skarsgård, and Elliot Page. The film was directed by Zal Batmanglij and released domestically on May 31, 2013, by Fox Searchlight Pictures.

In 2014, Slaughter played a role as a Pool Cleaner in the biopic Get On Up, starring Chadwick Boseman and Nelsan Ellis. And he also played a small role of the Hip Sports Reporter in the football drama When the Game Stands Tall, starring Jim Caviezel and Laura Dern. Later the same year he appeared as a guest in the FX's horror series American Horror Story.

In 2015, Slaughter played the role of a Passing Thief in the heist comedy Focus along with Will Smith and Margot Robbie. The film was released by Warner Bros. on February 27, 2015. He also appeared in the SundanceTV's drama series The Red Road.

Slaughter played the role of Agent Murphy in the 2016 live-action superhero film Max Steel, based on the Mattel's toy of same name. Stewart Hendler directed the film, which was released in 2015 by Open Road Films.

Slaughter played Squidward in the comedy Daddy's Home, along with Ferrell and Mark Wahlberg. Sean Anders directed the film, which was released on December 25, 2015, by Paramount Pictures. Slaughter also had supporting roles in the 2015 films American Ultra and The Big Short. He played an NSA staffer in the science fiction film Midnight Special, starring Michael Shannon, Joel Edgerton, and Kirsten Dunst. Jeff Nichols directed the film, released on March 18, 2016, by Warner Bros.

Slaughter played Josiah in the western film The Magnificent Seven, starring Denzel Washington, Chris Pratt and Ethan Hawke. The film was directed by Antoine Fuqua, and was released on September 23, 2016, by Columbia Pictures. He also had a small role in 2017's Geostorm.

== Filmography ==
=== Film ===
Year	Title	Role	Notes
2002	Blood Feast 2: All U Can Eat	Best Man	Uncredited
2002	Happy Here and Now	Napoleon Bonaparte	
2006	Stay Alive	Rex	
2006	Click	Newman Employee	Uncredited
2006	The Last Time	Intern	
2008	Deal	Announcer	
2009	12 Rounds	Technician	
2009	The Final Destination	Frankie	Uncredited
2009	The Open Road	Rental Car Employee	
2009	Welcome to Academia	Sweater Boy #2	
2009	Spring Break '83	Joe Francis	
2011	The Chaperone	Father	
2011	51	Dr. Haven	
2011	Love, Wedding, Marriage	Actor	Voice, uncredited
2011	Colombiana	Ryan	
2011	Storm War	Richie	
2011	Snatched	Biff Baxter	
2012	Battleship	BIP Technician	
2012	The Philly Kid	TV Announcer #1	
2012	The Campaign	Dermot	
2013	Parker	Ohio State Fair Security Guard Ben	
2013	The East	Trevor 'The Fed'	
2013	Shadow People	TV Anchor	
2013	Robosapien: Rebooted	James	
2013	White Rabbit	Dr. Clayton	
2013	Homefront	DEA Agent #2	
2014	The Lookalike	Bubbly Birthday Dude	
2014	Get On Up	Pool Cleaner	
2014	When the Game Stands Tall	Hip Sports Reporter	
2015	Zipper	Sam's Aide	
2015	Demonic	EMT Wayne	
2015	Focus	Passing Thief	
2015	Kidnapping Freddy Heineken	Junior Officer	
2015	The Livingston Gardener	Manny Guerrera	
2015	Return to Sender	Kevin	
2015	American Ultra	Staff Sgt. Harris	Uncredited
2015	Trumbo	D.C. Reporter	
2015	The Big Short	Real Estate Agent	
2015	Daddy's Home	Instigator Dad	
2015	Laundry Day	Bart	
2016	Midnight Special	NSA Staffer	
2016	Cold Moon	Dr. Everage	
2016	Bad Moms	Veterinarian	
2016	The Magnificent Seven	Josiah	
2016	Max Steel	Agent Murphy	
2016	Jack Reacher: Never Go Back	Parasource Aide	
2017	Happy Death Day	Winter	
2017	Geostorm	Karl Dright	
2017	Laundry Day	Bart	
2018	Billionaire Boys Club	Loan Officer	
2019	Eat, Brains, Love	Yuppy Taligater Dick	
2019	The Highwaymen	Reporter #1	
2019	Bayou Tales	Pvt. Chauvin	
2019	Richard Jewell	Tim Barker	
2020	Holidate	Barry	
2020	Bill & Ted Face the Music	Young Bill	
2021	One Month Out	Dr. Ryan	
2021	The Ravine	Kevin Turner	
2021	The Card Counter	Lackey #1	
2021	Mona Lisa and the Blood Moon	Officer Matthews	
2022	Where the Crawdads Sing	Social Services Officer	
2022	The Estate	Lawyer	
2023	We Have a Ghost	Reporter #2	
2023	Last Flamingo of the Red Summer Sunset	Thomas	
2023	The Burial	Robert Sperry	
2023	The Passenger	Hardy	
2023	Big George Foreman	Kurt Gaines	
2024	Adam the First	The Bounty Hunter	
2024	Nickel Boys	Dr. Cooke	
2025	Five Nights at Freddy's 2	Tony	
2026	A Statement	John Hoffmann	Completed

=== Television ===
Year	Title	Role	Notes
2004	Growing Pains: Return of the Seavers	Costco Clerk	Television film
2006	The Year Without a Santa Claus	Nerd Elf	Television film
2007	The Staircase Murders	Dr. James Adams	Television film
2009	Drop Dead Diva	Oscar Gilbert	Episode: "Second Chances"
2009	Wolvesbayne	Felix	Television film
2010	Beauty & the Briefcase	Accountant	Television film
2010	Revenge of the Bridesmaids	Gary	Television film
2010	Cigarettes et bas nylons	G.I. Weiss	Television film
2010	The Gates	Mr. Pollack	Episode: "Pilot"
2010–2011	Treme	Actor	7 episodes
2011	Things We Do for Love	Thomas	Episode: "Movin In"
2012	Breakout Kings	Storage Unit Manager	Episode: "I Smell Emmy"
2013	Nashville	Tabloid Reporter	Episode: "Tomorrow Never Comes"
2013	Remember Sunday	Jim	Television film
2013	Anna Nicole	Producer #1	Television film
2014	American Horror Story	Lavender Male	Episode: "Massacres and Matinees"
2015	The Red Road	Meyers / Myers	2 episodes
2015	Zoo	Nicholas Bradshaw	2 episodes
2016	Arceneaux: Melpomene's Song	Wilton Lowe	Television film
2017	Salem	Refugee Thief	Episode: "The Man Who Was Thursday"
2018	Cloak & Dagger	Vance Caruthers	Episode: "Princeton Offense"
2018	The Purge	Lee	Episode: "Take What's Yours"
2018	The First	Vista lawyer	2 episodes
2019	Patsy & Loretta	Randy Hughes	Television film
2019	Queen Sugar	Mark Criegar	Episode: "Pleasure Is Black"
2019	Mindhunter	Charles Sanders	Episode #2.8
2019	Hot Date	Grant	3 episodes
2019	On Becoming a God in Central Florida	Kissinger Haight	5 episodes
2021–2022	Secrets of Sulphur Springs	Officer Stevens	4 episodes
2022	Women of the Movement	Daily News Reporter #2	Episode: "The Last Word"
2022	The Thing About Pam	Scott	Episode: "She's a Loving Daughter"
2022	Mike	Announcer #1	Episode: "Monster"
2022	The Winchesters	Demon Jack	Episode: "You're Lost Little Girl"
2023	Mayfair Witches	Dr. Vernon Lamb	2 episodes
2023	Twisted Metal	Kerwin	Episode: "DRVTHRU"
