= Ozark Sharks =

2016 television film by Misty Talley

- Film poster
- Written by: Marcy Holland
- Story by: Greg Mitchell
- Directed by: Misty Talley
- Starring: Allisyn Ashley Arm; Dave Davis; Michael Papajohn; Ross Britz; Ashton Leigh; Thomas Francis Murphy; Laura Cayouette
- Music by: Andrew Morgan Smith
- Country of origin: United States
- Original language: English

Production
- Producer: Sam Claitor
- Cinematography: Matt S. Bell
- Editor: Misty Talley
- Running time: 88 minutes
- Production company: Active Entertainment
- Budget: $675,000

Original release
- Network: Syfy
- Release: July 28, 2016

Ozark Sharks is a 2016 American made-for-television horror thriller film that aired on Syfy on July 28, 2016. The TV film is written by Marcy Holland and Greg Mitchell, directed by Misty Talley, and starring Allisyn Ashley Arm, Dave Davis, Michael Papajohn, Ross Britz, Ashton Leigh, Thomas Francis Murphy, and Laura Cayouette.

== Plot ==
On a river, some teenagers are messing with firecrackers in the river where they are killed by sharks except for a girl named Dawn (Ashton Leigh).

Meanwhile, teenage siblings Harrison and Molly Kaye are reluctantly going on a vacation to the Ozarks with their parents Rick and Diane and their grandmother (Sharon Garrison). Shortly after they arrive, the family unpacks as Molly "takes in nature" by reading on the docks while soaking her feet. Her boyfriend and Harrison's best friend Curtis (Ross Britz) secretly arrives after taking a bus to the area.

While Harrison and Curtis meet eccentric local shopkeeper Jones, Molly accompanies her grandmother to one of the lakes where her grandmother is soon devoured by a shark. She tells Harrison and Curtis, who later find the grandmother's hat and severed arm. Harrison is attacked by a shark only for Jones to arrive and shoot it. After the group fails to convince the local sheriff of the threat, Jones tells the group that he's seen sharks in the lakes before and they have never attacked people. As a result, he believes something has riled them up.

Meanwhile, Rick and Diane go out on one of the lakes on a canoe ride. Harrison returns to their cabin to find them gone and decides to drive around the lake to search for them while Molly, Curtis and Jones decide to go out on the lake, armed with Jones's large arsenal of guns and other weapons. They soon discover that there are six sharks in the lake.

In the meantime, Harrison finds Dawn who tells Harrison that a fireworks festival will be occurring later that day and Harrison hopes to warn people of the sharks before the festival begins. He and Dawn then begin heading upriver in a canoe while Rick and Diane are attacked by a shark which bites off two of Rick's fingers. Diane shoots a flare allowing Molly, Curtis and Jones to find them. Rick and Diane return to shore safely and Jones kills one of the sharks only to be killed by another one shortly afterward. After Molly kills another shark, she, Curtis, Rick, and Diane head out to find Harrison in Jones's car.

When Molly, Curtis, Rick, and Diane fail to find Harrison, Curtis mentions the fireworks show and the group decides to warn the locals as well. The group then arrives at Jones's workshop to get more weapons while Harrison and Dawn arrive at another beach where several people are.

A shark attack then occurs and people begin fleeing the beach while Harrison and Dawn stay behind to help several girls who are stranded on a dock in the middle of the lake. They manage to rescue the majority of them while Dawn kills another shark using fireworks, but one girl is still left stranded on the dock. Molly, Curtis, Rick and Diane soon arrive and kill one of the sharks. Then they lure one of the sharks into a machine that rips it into pieces, killing it and allowing the remaining girl to reach shore. However, several of the shark pieces fly out and shoot through Curtis like bullets, killing him.

A devastated Molly sets out to kill the final shark, loading Jones's cannon with several fireworks. She then rides out to the dock, but as she does so she loses the lighter to the fireworks. Rick then throws Dawn's lighter out to Molly who uses it to light one of the firework. When the shark attempts to jump onto the dock and eat Molly, she shoots it up into the sky where the fireworks explode finally killing it.

== Cast ==
- Allisyn Ashley Arm as Molly Kaye
- Dave Davis as Harrison Kaye
- Michael Papajohn as Rick Kaye
- Ross Britz as Curtis
- Ashton Leigh as Dawn
- Thomas Francis Murphy as Jones
- Laura Cayouette as Diane Kaye
- Becky Andrews as Beth
- Sharon Garrison as Grandma
- Heather Paige as Amanda
- Jeff Pearson as Chase
- Stephon Rodgers as Wyatt
- Melissa Saint-Amand as Sadie

== Reception ==
HorrorNews.net gave the film a generally positive review, praising its acting, writing, and direction while criticizing its computer-generated effects.
