= Bomb City =

- Directed by: Jameson Brooks
- Written by: Jameson Brooks; Sheldon R Chick
- Produced by: Sheldon R Chick; Major Dodge
- Starring: Dave Davis; Glenn Morshower; Logan Huffman; Mae Mae Renfrow; Lorelei Linklater; Henry Knotts
- Cinematography: Jake Wilganowski
- Edited by: Jameson Brooks
- Music by: Cody Chick; Sheldon R Chick
- Production company: 3rd Identity Films
- Distributed by: Gravitas Ventures
- Release dates: March 31, 2017 (Dallas International Film Festival); February 9, 2018 (Hollywood premiere)
- Running time: 99 minutes
- Country: United States
- Language: English
- Budget: N/A
- Box office: $59,329

Bomb City is a 2017 American crime film directed by Jameson Brooks, co-written by Jameson Brooks and Sheldon R. Chick, and starring Dave Davis. The title of the film is a reference to one of the nicknames of the town of Amarillo for its nuclear weapon facilities.

On December 12, 1997, 19-year-old American punk musician Brian Theodore Deneke was killed in a deliberate hit and run attack in Amarillo, Texas, by 17-year-old Dustin Camp. Camp was later found guilty of voluntary vehicular manslaughter and sentenced to ten years' probation and a $10,000 fine, which was later dropped. In 2001, he was sentenced to eight years' imprisonment for a variety of parole violations. He was paroled under supervision on July 31, 2006. The homicide and the outcome of the trial against Camp galvanized the punk community and raised accusations about the social tolerance of the Texan city.

This film dramatizes the events of that night, some of what led up to it, and the aftermath of the death.

== Plot ==
Brian Deneke is a 19-year-old from Amarillo, Texas, who is into punk and the punk rock subculture. He is a local DIY promoter who books touring punk rock bands at a small run down venue. In this conservative town, there are many teenagers who actively follow punk and they routinely clashed with the jocks from one of the local high school's football team: The Tascosa Rebels.

== Cast ==
- Dave Davis as Brian
- Glenn Morshower as Cameron Wilson
- Logan Huffman as Ricky
- Lorelei Linklater as Rome
- Joda Pyle as Brady
- MaeMae Renfrow as Jade
- Dominic Ryan Gabriel as Jason
- Henry Knotts as King
- Eddie Hassell as Oles
- Luke Shelton as Cody Cates
- Major Dodge as Officer Denny

== Production ==
The film was the first feature film directed by Jameson Brooks. Brooks wrote the script with fellow Amarillo native, Sheldon Chick, and Chick produced the film with Major Dodge. The scenes from the film were shot in Dallas, Amarillo, Rockwall, and Denton, Texas. The cinematography was done by Jake Wilganowski.

== Release ==
Bomb City was initially screened at Dallas International Film Festival in early 2017. The film was then screened again on 23 January 2018 at Globe-News Center for the Performing Arts in Amarillo. After the screening, the film then received limited release to 17 cities.

=== Home media ===
The film was released digitally on February 9, 2018, and is also available through video-on-demand. The DVD and Blu-Ray released on April 12, 2018.

== Reception ==
Bomb City was generally well received by critics. On the review aggregator website Rotten Tomatoes, the film holds an approval rating of 82% based on 11 reviews. On Metacritic, which assigns normalized rating to reviews, the film has a weighted average score of 65 out of 100, based on 5 critics, indicating "generally favorable" reviews.

Joe Leydon of Variety described the film as "a potently riveting drama" that "spins the tragic tale of a punks-versus-jocks cultural clash that steadily builds to a furious altercation, with mortal consequences." He particularly praised the film's direction, writing, "Brooks demonstrates an instinctive appreciation for what buttons to push and what levers to pull in order to ratchet up suspense." The Hollywood Reporter similarly called the film "assured and effective" and "an empathetic drama ready to put straight-laced audiences in the shoes of a maligned subculture."

Conversely, Robert Abele of the Los Angeles Times described the film as an "overwrought indie melodrama" that "turns a real-life case from 1997 of white-on-white violence between combat-booted punks and snarling high school football players in Amarillo, Texas, into a 'who's the real threat' cautionary tale, one with the eye-rolling impact of Reefer Madness, or perhaps a profane after-school special about books, covers and judging."

== See also ==
- Murder of Sophie Lancaster
- Ethan Couch
