= Laundry Day (film) =

- Directed by: Randy Mack
- Written by: Randy Mack
- Produced by: Randy Mack
- Starring: Kerry Cahill; Billy Slaughter; Dave Davis; Samantha Ann; Theodus Crane; Andy J Forestbr; Carrie Anne Rose; Rebecca Hollingsworth; Michael Martin
- Cinematography: Eric Van Der Vynckt
- Edited by: Eva Contis
- Music by: Peter Orr
- Distributed by: Summer Hill Films
- Release dates: November 2016 (CineFlix Louisiana); 2018
- Running time: 89 minutes
- Country: United States
- Language: English
- Budget: $155,000

Laundry Day is an American independent dark comedy crime film directed and written by Randy Mack. The film is set in New Orleans and stars Kerry Cahill, Billy Slaughter, Dave Davis, and Samantha Ann. It is the directorial debut of Mack. The original score was composed and performed by Peter Orr of New Orleans band Sneaky Pete & The Fens. It is currently represented by Circus Road Films.

== Plot ==
Based on real events. A brawl erupts in a 24-hour bar-laundromat-nightclub between four New Orleans hustlers: a self-destructive musician, a corrupt bartender, a homeless street performer, and the city's least competent drug dealer. Each person's day leading up to the fight is revisited in turn, revealing a seedy and tragicomic web of unintended consequences, unforeseen repercussions, and service industry calamity.

== Cast ==
- Dave Davis as Ethan
- Kerry Cahill as Dee
- Billy Slaughter as Bart
- Samantha Ann as Natalee
- Theodus Crane as Stovey
- Andy J Forest as Freddy

== Awards and honors ==
2016 CineFlix Film Festival (Louisiana)

- Winner - Best Feature - Jury Prize - "The Robert Evans Award"
