= Jessie Mueller =

American actress and singer

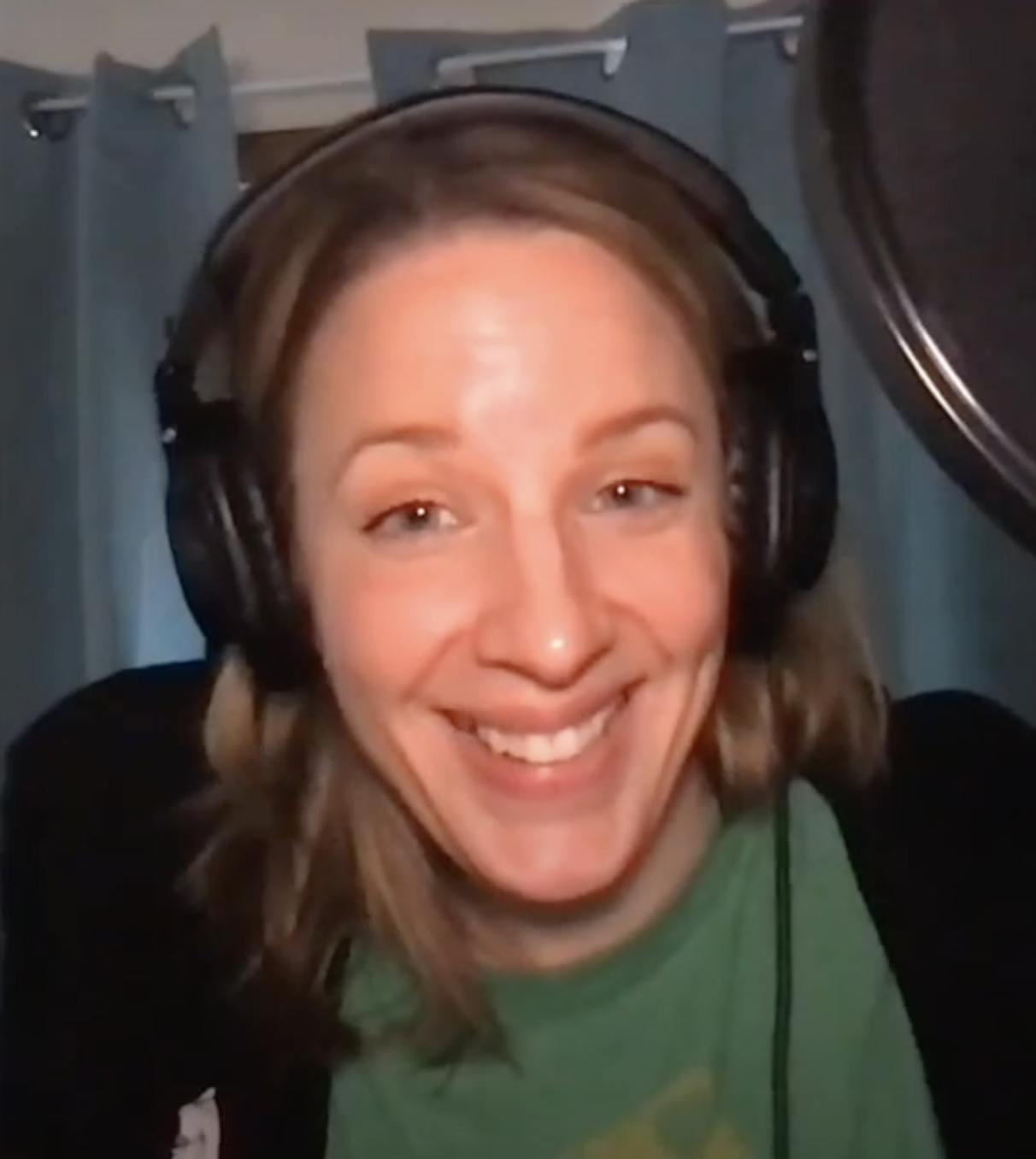
- Mueller in 2023
- Born: Jessica Ruth Mueller; February 20, 1983 (age 43); Evanston, Illinois, U.S.
- Education: Syracuse University
- Occupations: Actress, singer
- Years active: 2005–present
- Partner: Andy Truschinski (2009–present)
- Children: 1
- Relatives: Abby Mueller (sister)

Jessica Ruth Mueller (born February 20, 1983) is an American actress and singer. She started her acting career in Chicago and won two Joseph Jefferson Awards in 2008 and 2011 for her roles as Julie Jordan in Carousel and Amalia Balash in She Loves Me. In 2011, she moved to New York City to star in a Broadway revival of musical On a Clear Day You Can See Forever, for which she was nominated for a Tony Award for Best Featured Actress in a Musical at the 66th Tony Awards. She won the 2014 Tony Award for Best Actress in a Musical in Beautiful: The Carole King Musical. She went on to receive two additional Best Actress in a Musical Tony Award nominations for her leading roles in Waitress (2016) and the Broadway revival of Carousel (2018).

== Early life and education ==
Jessie Mueller was born to actors Jill (née Shellabarger) and Roger Mueller and was raised in Evanston, Illinois.

Her brothers, Andrew and Matt, and sister, Abby Mueller, are all actors and known for their work in Chicago, Off-Broadway, and Broadway productions. As of 2019, three of the four Mueller siblings had appeared in Broadway productions.

Mueller is Lutheran. She graduated from Evanston Township High School in 2001 and from Syracuse University in 2005.

== Acting career ==
=== 2005–2011: Chicago theatre ===
After graduation, Mueller returned to Chicago and acted for the Chicago Shakespeare Theater, traveling in 2006 to England to perform at the Swan Theatre in Stratford-upon-Avon as Lady Catrin Mortimer in Henry IV. She followed this with various roles in the Chicago area including Lizzie Fields in Baby, the Lady-In-Waiting in Once Upon a Mattress, and Esther Smith in Meet Me in St. Louis. At the Marriott Theatre in Lincolnshire, Illinois, she performed in Shout! The Mod Musical, Shenandoah, Guys and Dolls as Miss Adelaide, and Fiddler on the Roof as Tzeitel. In 2009 Mueller performed in two musicals at the Goodman Theatre, Animal Crackers as Grace Carpenter/Mary Stewart and A Christmas Carol as Belle/Catherine.

In 2011, she was named Actor of the Year by the Chicago Tribune and also was nominated for two Joseph Jefferson Awards, winning Best Lead Actress in a Musical for her performance as Amalia Balash in She Loves Me.

=== 2011–2016: Broadway debut, Waitress and initial success ===
Mueller made her Broadway debut in a revised revival of On a Clear Day You Can See Forever as Melinda Wells, a role originated by Barbara Harris. The production opened in December 2011. Mueller received critical praise for her performance, with one reviewer commenting, "Her voice contains notes of Garland, but she's no diva — this is a star of supreme self-possession". For this role, Mueller was nominated for the Drama Desk Award for Outstanding Featured Actress in a Musical and the Tony Award for Best Featured Actress in a Musical at the 66th Tony Awards.

Mueller played Cinderella in The Public Theater's 2012 production of Stephen Sondheim's Into the Woods at the Delacorte Theater.

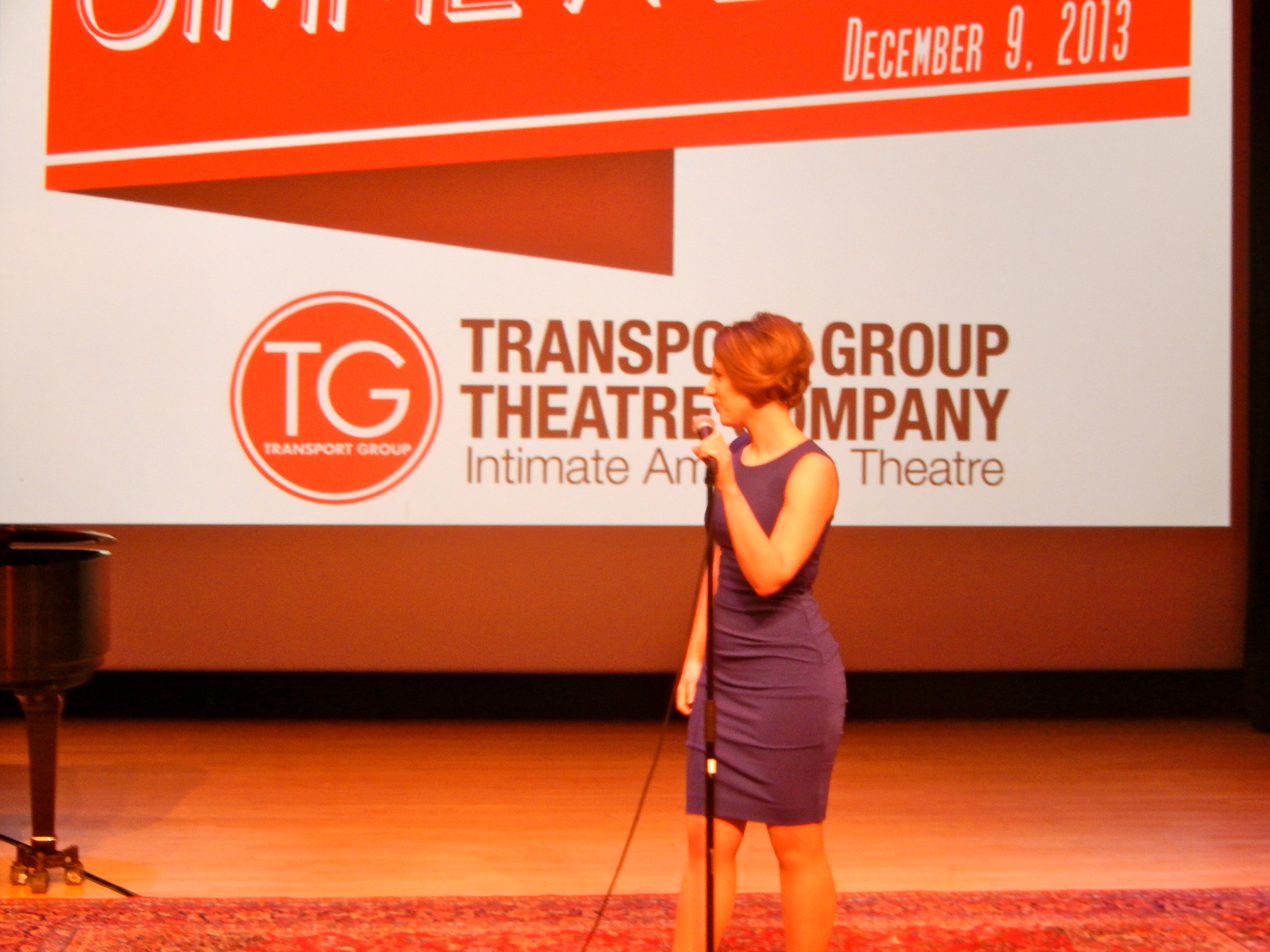
Mueller performing at the "Gimme A Break!" Transport Group Gala in 2013.

Mueller next was cast in the role of Helena Landless / Miss Janet Conover in Roundabout Theatre Company's 2012 revival of The Mystery of Edwin Drood, for which she was nominated for a Drama Desk Award. She then took over the role of Billie Bendix in Nice Work If You Can Get It, from March 29, 2013, until the show closed on June 15, 2013. Also in 2013, she once again took on the role of Carrie Pipperidge in Carousel at Lincoln Center in a staged concert production backed by the New York Philharmonic. The show was filmed and aired on PBS' Live from Lincoln Center.

Mueller starred in Beautiful: The Carole King Musical, which opened on Broadway on January 12, 2014. She originated the title role of Carole King. She had performed this role in the try-out in San Francisco in 2013. Her performance won her the Drama Desk Award for Outstanding Actress in a Musical and Tony Award for Best Lead Actress in a Musical at the 68th Tony Awards. She left the Broadway production on March 6, 2015. On February 8, 2015, Mueller won the Grammy Award for Best Musical Theater Album (shared with Carole King (music and lyrics) and producers Jason Howland, Steve Sidwell, and Billy Jay Stein) at the 57th Annual Grammy Awards.

On April 27, 2015, Mueller was the recipient of the Sarah Siddons Society Award at the Marriott Theatre in Lincolnshire, Illinois.

Mueller reprised her role as Jenna Hunterson in the musical adaptation of the film Waitress on Broadway, having previously played the role in a workshop of the musical in late 2014. With music and lyrics by Sara Bareilles and direction by Diane Paulus, the musical began its out-of-town tryout at the American Repertory Theater in August 2015. Waitress opened on Broadway at the Brooks Atkinson Theatre on April 24, 2016. Mueller was nominated for awards including a Tony Award at the 70th Tony Awards and a Drama Desk Award for her performance. Mueller also received critical praise for her performance. Charles Isherwood for the New York Times noted, "But it is when Ms. Mueller tears into the musical's climactic number, 'She Used to Be Mine,' that her talents are most fully and movingly harnessed... Ms. Mueller's vibrant performance of this gentle but wrenching song, featuring a melody that soars and then recedes in waves, is the high point of the show — and for that matter a high point of the Broadway season." Mueller left the production on March 26, 2017. Mueller's performance also earned her a 2016 Lilly Award for its message of female empowerment and safety.

=== 2017–2019: Film career, Carousel, and other projects ===
In April 2017, shortly after Mueller's departure from Waitress, it was announced that she would play the lead role of Julie Jordan in a Broadway revival of Carousel. The production began previews on February 28, 2018, at the Imperial Theatre and opened on April 12. The production closed on September 16, 2018.

Before beginning Carousel rehearsals, Mueller made her feature-film debut in Steven Spielberg's historical drama The Post. Mueller portrayed real life advice columnist Judith Martin (a.k.a. Miss Manners) alongside a cast including Meryl Streep, Tom Hanks, Sarah Paulson, and Carrie Coon. The film was released in select theaters on December 22, 2017, before its general release on January 12, 2018.

Also in 2017, Mueller was nominated for a Chicago/Midwest Emmy Award for her performance in the Lyric Opera's Chicago Voices concert, which was filmed and aired on WTTW.

In 2018, Mueller received three major nominations for her role as Julie Jordan, including her fifth Drama Desk nomination (and second win) and her fourth Tony Award nomination at the 72nd Tony Awards. She is the first actress in any Broadway production of Carousel to receive such nominations for the role.

In early 2019, Mueller starred as Marian Paroo, opposite Norm Lewis, in the Kennedy Center's semi-staged concert production of The Music Man. The production ran from February 6 through February 11. Later that year, Mueller portrayed country music legend Loretta Lynn in the Lifetime original movie Patsy & Loretta, alongside Megan Hilty as Patsy Cline. The film began production on location in Nashville in March and premiered on October 19, 2019. For this role, Mueller was nominated for a Critics' Choice Television Award for Best Actress in a Movie/Miniseries at the 25th Critics' Choice Awards.

=== 2020–present: Broadway return and career moving forward ===
Mueller starred alongside Tracy Letts in the play The Minutes on Broadway. Previews began on February 25, 2020, at the Cort Theatre with the show originally scheduled to open on March 15. However, the production, following a public mandate that closed all Broadway theaters, was halted due to the COVID-19 crisis. The show resumed previews in April 2022 at Studio 54 and officially opened on April 17.

On July 15, 2021, Mueller joined the cast of a new movie set to be released from Paramount Pictures in 2022 titled Secret Headquarters. Mueller also voiced the character Rider in the Netflix children's animated series Centaurworld, which premiered July 30, 2021.

== Personal life ==
In 2009, Mueller met and began a relationship with Andy Truschinski, an actor, film producer, and playwright, while performing opposite him in a Goodman Theatre production of A Christmas Carol. The couple reside together in New York City. In 2024, they welcomed a son.

== Activism and philanthropy ==
Mueller has worked frequently with the Broadway community to raise awareness and funds for various causes including LGBT+ rights, anti-gun violence, women's rights, and adoption. She supports Broadway Cares/Equity Fights AIDS and has appeared on multiple volumes of their annual Carols for a Cure albums. In 2016, she was among numerous performers who teamed with Broadway personality Seth Rudetsky to record a cover of "What The World Needs Now Is Love" to support the LGBT community of Central Florida after the Pulse nightclub shooting in Orlando; the movement included a benefit concert in Orlando as well as an appearance on Maya & Marty. Later that year, Mueller would again work with Rudetsky and his husband, James Wesley, to formulate the idea for Concert for America, a series of concerts supporting various social justice organizations.

Mueller is also known for her work supporting the arts and arts education. In 2014, Mueller performed at the launch of the FWD Theatre Project, a grassroots effort to support the creation of new musicals in the Chicago theatre community. In 2015, she performed with fellow Beautiful alum Jarrod Spector in a series of concerts benefitting various arts organizations. In 2016, she and partner Andy Truschinski were honored by the Alliance of Resident Theatres/New York with the Abe L. Blinder Award for Public Service and Arts Education. Mueller also recorded a song for the Museum of Modern Art's Pop! Goes the Easel album, a collection of children's songs inspired by works featured in the museum. In 2017, Mueller served as a mentor for students in Rosie's Theatre Kids, an organization started by actress and public personality Rosie O'Donnell to train and support youth in the performing arts. Mueller continues to support her own alma maters, performing at a benefit showcase for Evanston Township High School's YAMO theatre program in 2017 and providing opportunities for meetings and talkbacks with Syracuse University drama students. In her spare time, Mueller teaches master classes to young aspiring performers.

Mueller is an advocate for The Actors Fund.

== Acting credits ==
=== Theatre ===
Year	Title	Role	Theatre	Director(s)	Ref.
2005	Once Upon a Mattress	Ensemble (u.s. Winnifred)	Drury Lane Theatre	Ray Frewen	
2006	Baby	Lizzie Fields	Theatre at the Center	David Perkovich	
2006	Henry IV, Part 1 & Part 2	Lady Catrin Mortimer (u.s. Doll Tearsheet)	Chicago Shakespeare Theatre	Barbara Gaines	
2006	Henry IV, Part 1 & Part 2	Lady Catrin Mortimer (u.s. Doll Tearsheet)	Royal Shakespeare Theatre	Barbara Gaines	
2006–07	The Three Musketeers	Cecile/Ensemble	Chicago Shakespeare Theatre	David H. Bell	
2007	Shenandoah	Jenny Anderson	Marriott Theatre	David H. Bell	
2007	How Can You Run With a Shell On Your Back?	Daisy	Chicago Shakespeare Theatre	Peter Flynn	
2008	Carousel	Carrie Pipperidge	Court Theatre	Charles Newell	
2008	Carousel	Carrie Pipperidge	Long Wharf Theatre	Charles Newell	
2008	Willy Wonka	Veruca Salt	Chicago Shakespeare Theatre	Joe Leonardo	
2008	All Shook Up	Natalie Haller	Marriott Theatre	Marc Robin	
2008	Meet Me in St. Louis	Esther Smith	Drury Lane Theatre	Jim Corti	
2008–09	The Bowery Boys	Ensemble	Marriott Theatre	David H. Bell	
2009	Curtains	Niki Harris	Drury Lane Theatre	William Brown	
2009	Animal Crackers	Grace Carpenter/Mary Stewart	Goodman Theatre	Henry Wishcamper	
2009	A Christmas Carol	Belle/Catherine	Goodman Theatre	William Brown	
2010	Fiddler on the Roof	Tzeitel	Marriott Theatre	David H. Bell	
2010	Sleeping Beauty	Princess Amber	Marriott Theatre	Matt Raftery	
2010	Over the Tavern	Annie Pazinski	Peninsula Players	Kristine Thatcher	
2010	A Little Night Music	Anne Egerman	Peninsula Players	Greg Vinkler	
2010	She Loves Me	Amalia Balash	Writers Theatre	Michael Halberstam	
2011	Guys and Dolls	Miss Adelaide	Marriott Theatre	Matt Raftery	
2011	Merrily We Roll Along	Mary Flynn	The Music Theatre Company	Jessica Redish	
2011	Shout! The Mod Musical	The Blue Girl	Marriott Theatre	Rachel Rockwell	
2011–12	On a Clear Day You Can See Forever	Melinda Wells	St. James Theatre	Michael Mayer	
2012	Into the Woods	Cinderella	The Public Theater (Shakespeare in the Park)	Timothy Sheader and Liam Steel	
2012–13	The Mystery of Edwin Drood	Helena Landless/Miss Janet Conover	Studio 54	Scott Ellis	
2013	Carousel	Carrie Pipperidge	Lincoln Center (Avery Fisher Hall)	John Rando	
2013	Nice Work If You Can Get It	Billie Bendix (replacement)	Imperial Theatre	Kathleen Marshall	
2013	Beautiful: The Carole King Musical	Carole King	Curran Theatre (out-of-town tryout)	Marc Bruni	
2013–15	Beautiful: The Carole King Musical	Carole King	Stephen Sondheim Theatre	Marc Bruni	
2015	Waitress	Jenna Hunterson	American Repertory Theater (out-of-town tryout)	Diane Paulus	
2016–17	Waitress	Jenna Hunterson	Brooks Atkinson Theatre	Diane Paulus	
2018	Carousel	Julie Jordan	Imperial Theatre	Jack O'Brien	
2019	The Music Man	Marian Paroo	Kennedy Center (Eisenhower Theater)	Marc Bruni	
2020	The Minutes	Ms. Johnson	Cort Theatre	Anna D. Shapiro	
2022	The Minutes	Ms. Johnson	Studio 54	Anna D. Shapiro	
2022	Guys and Dolls	Miss Adelaide	Kennedy Center (Eisenhower Theater)	Marc Bruni	
2023	Gutenberg! The Musical!	The Producer (one night only)	James Earl Jones Theatre	Alex Timbers	
2025	The Rink	Angel	Classic Stage Company	Dave Solomon	
2027	Paddington the Musical	Mrs. Brown	Al Hirschfeld Theatre	Luke Sheppard	

=== Film ===
Year	Title	Role	Ref.
2017	The Post	Judith Martin	
2022	Secret Headquarters	Lily Kincaid	
2023	A Good Person	Sandra Keen	

=== Television ===
Year	Title	Role	Notes	Ref.
2013	Carousel: Live from Lincoln Center	Carrie Pipperidge	Filmed stage production	
2016	The Family	Fran	2 episodes	
2017	Blue Bloods	Faith Madson	Episode: "Common Ground"	
2019	Madam Secretary	Leslie	Episode: "Between the Seats"	
2019	Patsy & Loretta	Loretta Lynn	Television film	
2021	Evil	Anya	2 episodes	
2021	Centaurworld	Rider (voice)	Main role (11 episodes)	
2022	Candy	Sherry Cleckler	5 episodes	

== Discography ==
=== Cast recordings and soundtracks ===
- The Mystery of Edwin Drood – The 2013 New Broadway Cast Recording (2013)
- Beautiful: The Carole King Musical – Original Broadway Cast Recording (2014)
- Waitress – Original Broadway Cast Recording (2016)
- Carousel – 2018 Broadway Cast Recording (2018)
- Patsy & Loretta - Original Motion Picture Soundtrack (2019)
- Diary of a Wimpy Kid: The Musical - Studio Cast Recording (2023)

=== Collaborative projects ===
- Broadway's Carols for a Cure, Volume 16 (2014)
- Pop! Goes the Easel (2016)
- From Broadway With Love: A Benefit Concert for Orlando (2016)
- Broadway's Carols for a Cure, Volume 18 (2016)

=== As featured artist ===
- Sing You to Sleep by Anika Larsen (2014)

== Accolades ==
Year	Award	Category	Nominated work	Result	Ref.
2008	Joseph Jefferson Award	Actress in a Supporting Role in a Musical	Carousel	Won	
2011	Joseph Jefferson Award	Actress in a Principal Role in a Musical	She Loves Me	Won	
2012	Joseph Jefferson Award	Actress in a Principal Role in a Musical	Guys and Dolls	Nominated	
2012	Tony Award	Best Actress in a Featured Role in a Musical	On a Clear Day You Can See Forever	Nominated	
2012	Drama Desk Award	Outstanding Featured Actress in a Musical	On a Clear Day You Can See Forever	Nominated	
2012	Drama League Award	Distinguished Performance	On a Clear Day You Can See Forever	Nominated	
2012	Theatre World Award	Outstanding Broadway Debut	On a Clear Day You Can See Forever	Honoree	
2013	Drama Desk Award	Outstanding Actress in a Featured Role in a Musical	The Mystery of Edwin Drood	Nominated	
2013	Broadway.com Audience Awards	Favorite Onstage Pair (with Andy Karl)	The Mystery of Edwin Drood	Nominated	
2014	Tony Award	Best Actress in a Leading Role in a Musical	Beautiful: The Carole King Musical	Won	
2014	Drama Desk Award	Outstanding Actress in a Musical	Beautiful: The Carole King Musical	Won	
2014	Drama League Award	Distinguished Performance	Beautiful: The Carole King Musical	Nominated	
2014	Outer Critics Circle Award	Outstanding Actress in a Leading Role in a Musical	Beautiful: The Carole King Musical	Nominated	
2014	Broadway.com Audience Awards	Favorite Actress in a Leading Role in a Musical	Beautiful: The Carole King Musical	Nominated	
2015	Grammy Award	Best Musical Theater Album	Beautiful: The Carole King Musical	Won	
2016	Tony Award	Best Actress in a Leading Role in a Musical	Waitress	Nominated	
2016	IRNE Award	Best Actress in a Musical	Waitress	Won	
2016	Drama Desk Award	Outstanding Actress in a Musical	Waitress	Nominated	
2016	Drama League Award	Distinguished Performance	Waitress	Nominated	
2016	Outer Critics Circle Award	Outstanding Actress in a Leading Role in a Musical	Waitress	Nominated	
2016	Broadway.com Audience Awards	Favorite Actress in a Leading Role in Musical	Waitress	Nominated	
2017	Grammy Award	Best Musical Theater Album	Waitress	Nominated	
2017	Chicago/Midwest Emmy Award	Outstanding Crafts Achievement for On-Camera Talent	Chicago Voices	Nominated	
2018	Tony Award	Best Actress in a Leading Role in a Musical	Carousel	Nominated	
2018	Drama Desk Award	Outstanding Actress in a Leading Role in a Musical	Carousel	Won	
2018	Drama League Award	Distinguished Performance	Carousel	Nominated	
2019	Grammy Award	Best Musical Theater Album	Carousel	Nominated	
2020	Critics' Choice Television Award	Best Actress in a Limited Series or Movie Made for Television	Patsy & Loretta	Nominated	

=== Special honors and awards ===
- Chicago Tribune's Actor of the Year Award – 2011
- Sarah Siddons Society Actress of the Year Award – April 27, 2015
- A.R.T./New York: Abe L. Blinder Award for Public Service and Arts Education – April 11, 2016
- Lilly Award for Acting – May 23, 2016
- Studio Tenn Theatre Company Legacy Award – April 5, 2025
