= Scheisskopf =

Fictional character in Catch-22

Scheisskopf (in English, "shithead") is a minor fictional character in the 1961 novel Catch-22 by Joseph Heller, who is promoted through the ranks from Lieutenant to First Lieutenant, Colonel and finally to Lieutenant General. Lieutenant Scheisskopf is the title of Chapter Eight and General Scheisskopf is the title of Chapter Thirty-seven. Scheisskopf is a parade-obsessed ROTC graduate and training officer at the Air cadet base where Yossarian and Clevinger are trained before being sent overseas. Later Scheisskopf is himself transferred overseas to General Peckem’s command.

== Biographical summary ==
=== Cadet training ===
Scheisskopf is the training commander for Yossarian and Clevinger, and he takes a particular dislike to Clevinger. Even though Clevinger is just as serious for parades as Scheisskopf, and his ideas help the squadron win multiple parades, Scheisskopf still considers him a wise guy, and someone that needs to be brought down a peg or two. Eventually Clevinger is tried for stumbling while marching at an Action Board, and he has the "book thrown at him." The bloated Colonel chairs the Board where also present are Major Metcalf, Scheisskopf (as a judge, prosecutor, and as the officer defending Clevinger) and note taker, Popinjay.

Scheisskopf is constantly thinking up new schemes to help try to win the parade, held each Sunday afternoon. He reads books on marching and uses chocolate soldiers or plastic cowboys to act out his manoeuvres. His success and innovation in organizing parades leads to his later promotions.

=== Mrs. Scheisskopf and Dori Duz ===
Scheisskopf is always too busy planning parades to fulfill his wife's masochistic sexual fantasies and replies to her requests, “Don’t you know there’s a parade going on?” Instead, she sleeps with Scheisskopf's cadets, so they can all get revenge on her husband, and so can she for some “unforgettable crime she couldn’t recall.” Mrs. Scheisskopf is well read and has a Maths major, but can not count to twenty eight without getting into trouble every month; that is, she frequently has (or at least feigns) pregnancy scares due to her affairs with other men at the base.

Mrs. Scheisskopf's girl friend Dori Duz was a “lively tart” who used men and then tossed them aside, humiliating them in bed with her superior sexual ability. Yossarian only sleeps with her once, but wishes he could do so again. Yossarian loves her, but as he never gets another opportunity to sleep with her, as she found him only "fair", he instead sleeps with Mrs. Scheisskopf to revenge himself on her husband for the way he treated Clevinger. In one notable exchange, Mrs. Scheisskopf and Yossarian lie in bed on Thanksgiving debating the existence of God. While both claim to be atheists, Mrs. Scheisskopf insists that the God she does not believe in is benevolent, and she is distressed at Yossarian's characterizing the God he does not believe in as sadistic or stupid.

=== Rome ===
Nearing the climax of the novel, Scheisskopf is shipped out to General Peckem’s command in Rome, and promoted to Colonel. On arriving he is welcomed by Peckem, who finds Scheisskopf unreceptive to his wit and charm, and is glad that he has been blessed with such a weakling as a subordinate.

The only things Scheisskopf is concerned about are running parades and sending for his wife, both of which had been promised by the officers that sent him overseas. Peckem refuses both requests, and instead allows Scheisskopf to send out announcements stating that there will be no parade each week:

Due to circumstances beyond my control, there will be no big parade this Sunday afternoon. Colonel Scheisskopf

Finally, in a massive oversight by General Peckem and Ex-PFC Wintergreen, on the day General Peckem supersedes General Dreedle’s wing command, his request for combat operations to be transferred to his old command, “Special Services”, is also granted. As Scheisskopf is now ranking senior officer of Special Services, he is promoted to Lieutenant General, and takes command of all combat operations, becoming the commanding officer of General Peckem. His first orders, relayed by Colonel Cargill, makes his intentions clear:

”Oh, my God!” he cried, as the phone fell from his fingers. “Do you know what he wants? He wants us to march! He wants everybody to march!”

== In other media ==
Scheisskopf appears in the 2019 miniseries portrayed by George Clooney who also is an executive producer and directs part of the series. Scheisskopf's attention is much more direct to Yossarian than to Clevinger. Mrs. Scheisskopf is only seen sleeping with Yossarian whom she seems to genuinely love. Scheisskopf also plays a major role in the 5th episode where it is implied that he caught on to their tryst when he tells Yossarian that his wife sends her regards. In a departure from the novel, Scheisskopf prevents Yossarian from leaving the war, despite having made a deal with Colonel Cathcart prior, but allows him to continue fighting without his clothes on.
