= Killing of Brian Deneke =

1997 hit and run attack in Amarillo, Texas

Brian Deneke
- Deneke in a parade on Halloween
- Born: Brian Theodore Deneke; March 9, 1978; Wichita, Kansas, U.S.
- Died: December 12, 1997 (aged 19); Amarillo, Texas, U.S.
- Other name: Sunshine
- Occupation: Musician

On December 12, 1997, 19-year-old American punk musician Brian Theodore Deneke (March 9, 1978 – December 12, 1997) was killed in a deliberate hit and run attack in Amarillo, Texas, by 17-year-old Dustin Camp.

Camp was later found guilty of voluntary vehicular manslaughter and sentenced to ten years' probation and a $10,000 fine. In 2001, he was sentenced to eight years' imprisonment for a variety of parole violations. He was paroled under supervision on July 31, 2006.

The homicide and the outcome of the trial against Camp galvanized the punk community and raised accusations about the social tolerance of the Texan city.

== Brian Deneke ==
Brian Deneke was born in Wichita, Kansas, the younger of two sons to Michael Max "Mike" Deneke and Elizabeth Louise "Betty" Bieker. His father was a native of Beloit, Kansas, and was born to Sylvester and Darlene Deneke. Betty Deneke was a native of Concordia, Kansas, and was born to Omer and Marie Bieker. Mike Deneke and Betty Bieker married in 1974 in Concordia, and had two sons: Jason Michael and Brian Theodore. The family settled in southwest Amarillo, Texas, from Wichita in winter 1981.

Deneke was a dancer in a Boy Scout troop during elementary school. He attended Belmar Elementary, Paramount Terrace Elementary, Crockett Middle School, and Amarillo High School in Amarillo. He dropped out of high school during his junior year, and earned his GED at age 17. Deneke was an artist for Stanley Marsh 3's art project, Dynamite Museum, which consisted of handmade mock road signs scattered across Amarillo city streets. Deneke was also the vocalist of punk rock group The White Slave Traders, and aspired to become a famous punk rock musician.

Deneke was remembered by his friends as being friendly, charismatic and seen as a leader in local punk circles, helping to organize many local musical events. Nicknamed "Sunshine", Deneke had a spiked mohawk hairstyle and often wore a black leather jacket with a studded leather collar and sported homemade tattoos. He was also an enthusiastic skateboarder, and it was this interest that drew him into the punk subculture.

Like other punks in Amarillo, Deneke had suffered frequent harassment and bullying, and acquired nicknames such as "Punch" and "Fist Magnet" by tormentors. His parents were against their son's lifestyle, and warned him of possible prejudice from people in Amarillo.

== Death ==
The International House Of Pancakes across the street from the Western Plaza Shopping Center was a popular hangout for youths in Amarillo, Texas. On Saturday, December 6, 1997, a confrontation occurred at the IHOP involving Dustin Camp, a student and football player for Tascosa High School in Amarillo, and John King, a member of the punk rock community. One witness, Kendra Petitt, claims that Camp hopped the median in his Cadillac as he tried to run the punks down in the parking lot, and that Camp missed and instead had his car window smashed by John King's police baton. Camp and friends denied this event happened. Tension and resentment from this confrontation lingered among the respective groups for the following week.

After a night of heavy drinking on Friday, December 12, 1997, Dustin Camp and his companions returned to the Western Plaza Shopping Center at 11:00 p.m., anticipating a fight with members of the punk community. Violence soon broke out between jocks and punks outside of the IHOP restaurant. During the fight Dustin Camp retreated into his Cadillac; at first Camp appeared to drive away but then he sharply turned back, targeting Deneke by running him over. Camp's attorney would later argue that Camp returned to defend a fellow jock; however, this claim was denied by Deneke's companions.

== Trial of Dustin Camp ==
During Camp's murder trial, a passenger eyewitness testified that Camp exclaimed "I'm a Ninja in my Caddy!" as he targeted Deneke and then "I bet he liked that one!" after he ran over Deneke as he sped away from the scene.

Dustin Camp, who was born in Amarillo, was charged with murder. While out on $100,000 bail, he was allowed to attend his graduation ceremony at his original high school. During his trial his defense claimed that he had acted in defense of a friend whom Deneke was attacking. Camp's defense attorney, Warren L. Clark, defended by trying to shift the blame on Deneke and the punk community. Clark portrayed the punks as violent thugs and went as far as calling them "armed goons". Defense attorney Clark used incidents from Deneke's past that made him look violent, and claimed that he was the aggressor on the night of his death. The defense also claimed that witnesses for the prosecution were punks who lied under oath. In contrast to the punks, the defense characterized the alleged murderer as a wholesome and clean-cut youth. The defense emphasized Camp's normalcy, claiming Camp was a good Christian, a good Texan, and a football player.

The punks who testified consistently saw Deneke as the victim. One of Camp's companions, who was a passenger in his car, also incriminated him. She did not see him acting in defense of a third person and testified on the "Ninja in the Caddy" exclamations.

Although Camp had been charged with murder, at the conclusion of the trial in 1999, the jury only found him guilty of voluntary manslaughter and sentenced him to ten years' probation and a $10,000 fine (equivalent to $19,000 in 2025). Both Camp's attorney and the district attorney found this sentence to be uncommonly mild. The jury refused to comment after the trial, citing the welfare of the families. Alternate juror Wade Colvin said he was "completely surprised" that the jury did not convict Camp of murder and opted for a manslaughter conviction instead. "What stuck with me more than anything—I felt like Brian was running away and Dustin had a chance [to stop his car]," Colvin said. He believed the jury gave Camp a second chance because of his youth. "I had those thoughts, too, about him being so young," Colvin said, "but he did wrong."

=== Camp's probation violations ===
In June 2001, Camp was apprehended for underage drinking and was arrested for being a minor in the possession of alcohol. Michael Camp, father of Dustin, attempted to cover for his son's probation violations. Michael Camp was formally charged with making false statements to the police. He was sentenced to 60 days' deferred adjudication (a type of probation) and a US$100 fine after a plea bargain. In September 2001, Dustin Camp received an eight-year prison sentence for violating his probation. Dustin's brother David was also arrested during the June events. He served one year of probation for providing alcohol to minors and hindering police efforts to arrest Dustin Camp.

In 2006, Camp was paroled under supervision until his sentence expired in 2009.

== Media coverage and significance ==
Brian's death shook Amarillo and horrified the punk subculture. Punks in Amarillo reported that they had often been targets of abuse and harassment by jocks because of their differences, even before the incident; after the trial there was a general feeling that Camp walked free because he was seen as a "good kid", unlike the punks. The lenient sentence for Camp caused a public outcry in Amarillo and incited a debate on whether the city was a tolerant place. The mayor of Amarillo, Kel Seliger, attempted to distance the town from the verdict. "It was not a community verdict," he said, "it was 12 people." Nonetheless, the murder trial had prompted the mayor to emphasize tolerance for differences and mutual respect. Deneke's father was unsurprised by the lenient verdict: "Quite honestly," Deneke's father said, "we had been prepared for that. If you pay attention to what happens in the criminal justice system, it's not unusual".

National television and radio paid attention to the case in 1999 and 2000 being featured on Leeza, Dateline NBC, 20/20, NPR, and in an MTV documentary, Criminal "Punks vs Preps".

A 2005 episode of the A&E documentary series City Confidential episode renewed interest in the case. In 2000, musician Marilyn Manson discussed the Deneke case at the Disinfo conference while addressing the issue of the causes of youth violence.

The conflict between jocks and punks in Amarillo has been compared to the widespread social divisions in Columbine High School which have been said to have contributed to the Columbine High School massacre. The Deneke case has also been referred to briefly in an academic article arguing the case for expanding the definitions of bias crime beyond the usual boundaries of religious, sexual and racial groups, to other social groupings.

== Tributes to Brian Deneke ==
=== Concerts ===
Numerous tribute gigs and concerts have been made for Deneke since his death. In 2000, The Unity Through Diversity festival was held in Amarillo featuring The Undead and Mike Watt, amongst other bands. The tenth anniversary of his death demonstrated the ongoing significance of his death to the punk community with 25 concerts being held on December 8, 2007, across the United States and Canada, including concerts in New York City, Chicago, Seattle and five concerts across Texas including a two-day event in Amarillo. Half of the money raised by these events went to National Organization for Parents of Murdered Children, the other half to various anti prejudice causes.

=== Songs ===
Deneke's death has been the subject of a number of songs, including:

- "Brian's Song" by Fifteen
- "Brian's Song" by The Code
- "Tears On A Pillow (in Amarillo)" by The Undead
- "Fortunes of War" by Dropkick Murphys
- "Sunshine Fist Magnet" by Against All Authority
- "A Punk Killed" and "Murdered" by Total Chaos
- "American Justice Is All a Lie" by Career Soldiers
- "Sunshine" by The Swellers
- "Self defense of a third person" by Downfall 2012
- "Hail" by Hamell on Trial
- "Brian Deneke" by Christopher Owens
- "Punk Song" by LambBed
- "Brian Deneke" by Dimenzia X
- ”Bomb City” by Paint the Stars

=== Drama ===
A play about the Deneke case, Manslaughtered, by David Bucci, was performed at the Annex Theatre, Seattle in 2000.

=== Film ===
A film about Brian Deneke's life has been made called Bomb City, named after Amarillo's nickname as a nuclear weapons disassembly site.

== See also ==
- Murder of Sophie Lancaster

== Bibliography ==
- Mikita Brottman (ed), Car Crash Culture (Palgrave Macmillan, 2002), 254-6
- Jeff Ferrell, Tearing Down the Streets: Adventures in Urban Anarchy (Palgrave Macmillan 2001)
- Texas Monthly on True Crime (University of Texas Press, 2007) p. 19-38
- "Death In Texas(the story of Brian Deneke)" PUNK PLANET 36

== Filmography ==
- Bomb City Film 3rd Identity
- Bomb City
- MTV: Criminal: Punks vs. Preps (CBS News Productions, 2000)
- City Confidential - Amarillo, TX: High School Hit & Run Episode Number: 128 Season Num: 11 First Aired: Saturday July 9, 2005
