= Now and Then: From Coney Island to Here =

1998 book by Joseph Heller

Now and Then
- First edition
- Author: Joseph Heller
- Language: English
- Genre: Memoir
- Published: Knopf
- Publication date: February 1998
- Publication place: US
- Media type: Print (hardback)
- Pages: 259
- Followed by: Portrait of an Artist, as an Old Man (2000)

Now and Then is Joseph Heller's 1998 memoir. The first half of the memoir focuses on Heller's childhood in Coney Island and is, in fact, as much about the place as it is about the man. Heller describes growing up, his mother and half-siblings in a fundamentally safe and fun neighborhood of punch ball, football, amusement park, and Nathan's Famous Hot Dog Stand.

== Synopsis ==
Heller describes his early passion for writing and some of the primary school papers that preview his adult fiction. Picking up late in high school, Heller reviews the various jobs he held before enlisting in the Air Force: telegram messenger boy, clerk at an insurance company, and blacksmith's helper in a shipyard.

With World War II looming, Heller enlisted in the US Army Air Corps, where he served as a bombardier. Heller describes several of his fellow soldiers and the events that would later become part of Catch-22.

Heller completed his required number of missions, was discharged, and was married to his first wife within five months. She accompanied him to college, which Heller attended on the GI Bill, but we learn very little about her. Heller describes his early attempts at writing fiction, which occurred while he worked as an English professor and ad copywriter, and reminds the reader of the many prominent American writers who have been unable to support themselves on their words alone.

Heller provides interesting details from his life's story, but doesn't rehash any of his works. Catch-22 and Something Happened receive the most attention, while Picture This, God Knows, and Good as Gold receive brief mentions. The most insight Heller provides into his body of his work is a discussion in the penultimate chapter of his experience with psychoanalysis. Heller revisits his father's death in the chapter, and notes how so many of his works have a prominent, but not central, character's death described in the penultimate chapter (e.g., Snowden in Catch-22). Heller also discusses why the only emotional closeness that appears in his works is between father and son. (e.g., David and Absalom in God Knows) Heller provides an in-depth reason to the insanity that often lurks in people's minds.
