= One-act play =

Play that has only one act, as distinct from plays that occur over several acts

A one-act play is a play that has only one act, as distinct from plays that occur over several acts. One-act plays may consist of one or more scenes. The 20-40 minute play has emerged as a popular subgenre of the one-act play, especially in writing competitions. One act plays make up the overwhelming majority of fringe theatre shows including at the Edinburgh Festival Fringe.

The origin of the one-act play may be traced to the very beginning of recorded Western drama: in ancient Greece, Cyclops, a satyr play by Euripides, is an early example. The satyr play was a farcical short work that came after a trilogy of multi-act serious drama plays. A few notable examples of one act plays emerged before the 19th century including various versions of the Everyman play and works by Moliere and Calderon. One act plays became more common in the 19th century and are now a standard part of repertory theatre and fringe festivals.

One act plays were very popular in the 20th century and it is regarded by many to be a modern product.

== One-act plays by major dramatists ==
- Euripides – Cyclops
- Moliere – The Flying Doctor (1659)
- Edward Albee – The Goat, or Who Is Sylvia? (2002)
- Samuel Beckett – Krapp's Last Tape (1958)
- Anton Chekhov – A Marriage Proposal (1890)
- Joseph Heller – Clevinger's Trial (1973)
- Israel Horovitz – Line (1974)
- Eugène Ionesco – The Bald Soprano (1950)
- Arthur Miller – A Memory of Two Mondays (1955)
- August Strindberg – Pariah (1889)
- Thornton Wilder – The Long Christmas Dinner (1931)
- Cormac McCarthy – The Sunset Limited (2006)
- Jean-Paul Sartre – No Exit (1944)
- Athol Fugard – "Master Harold"...and the Boys (1982)
- Yasmina Reza – Art (1994)
- Oscar Wilde – Salome (1891 [French] 1894 [English])

== See also ==
- List of one-act plays by Tennessee Williams
- Monodrama

== Sources ==
- Murray, Stephen. Taking Our Amusements Seriously. LAP, 2010. ISBN 978-3-8383-7608-0.
