= Good as Gold (novel) =

1979 novel by Joseph Heller

Good As Gold
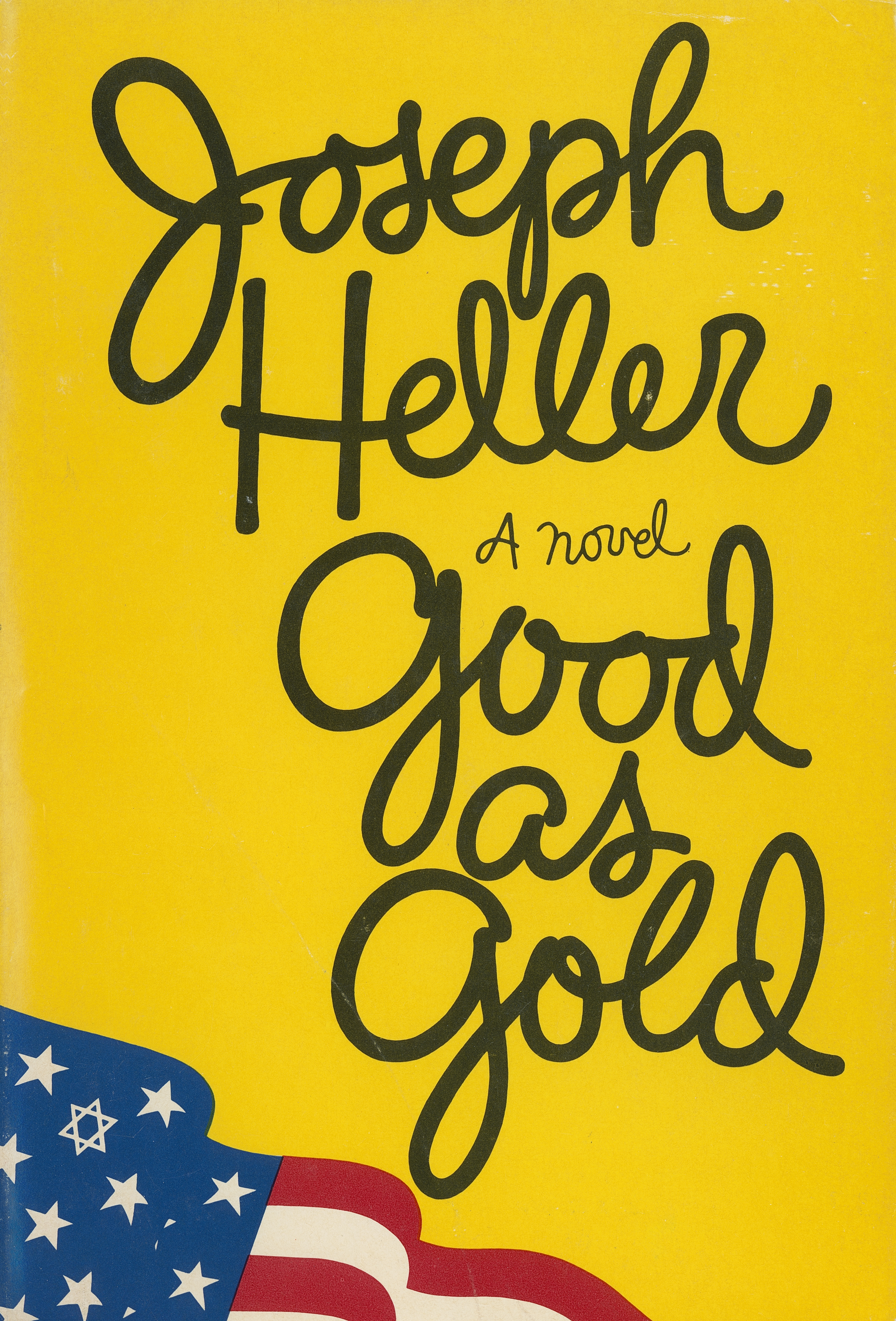
- First edition cover
- Author: Joseph Heller
- Cover artist: Paul Bacon
- Language: English
- Genre: Comedy novel
- Publisher: Simon & Schuster
- Publication date: 1979
- Publication place: United States
- Media type: Print (Hardcover and Paperback)
- Pages: 447 pp
- ISBN: 0-671-22923-0
- OCLC: 4493009
- Dewey Decimal: 813/.5/4
- LC Class: PZ4.H47665 Go PS3558.E476
- Preceded by: Something Happened
- Followed by: God Knows

Good as Gold is the third novel written by Joseph Heller. Portions of it were printed in The New York Times in 1976, and in Playboy in April 1979. The book was published in late 1979. The dust jacket was illustrated by Paul Bacon.

== Plot ==
Dr. Bruce Gold is a Jewish, middle-aged, university English professor, unhappily married, hated by his father and brother and ignored by his children. He is the author of one book, four essay collections, "derivative" short stories, and "atrocious" poems. Because he has favorably reviewed a book by the US president, he is offered the chance for success in the form of the job as the first-ever Jewish Secretary of State. To get the job, he is willing to divorce his wife and marry the daughter of an anti-Semitic elder statesman.

== Literary significance and criticism ==
The novel was well regarded by both fans of Heller and literary critics, being viewed as a return to the gag and verbal play that Heller established in Catch-22 and abandoned in favor of the scathing sarcasm and the darker story in Something Happened. Good as Gold functions as a satire on the U.S. government, in a manner similar to the satirization of the army in Catch-22 and the corporation in Something Happened.

Gore Vidal listed Good as Gold as one of his five favorite post-World War II novels, describing it as Heller "at his deadly best, illuminating a hustler on the make in politics".

The New York Times reviewer John Leonard called Good as Gold a "savage" novel, "a nightmare of abuse and opportunism, of surreal graffiti...a nursery rhyme laced with acid."
