= 488th Bombardment Squadron =

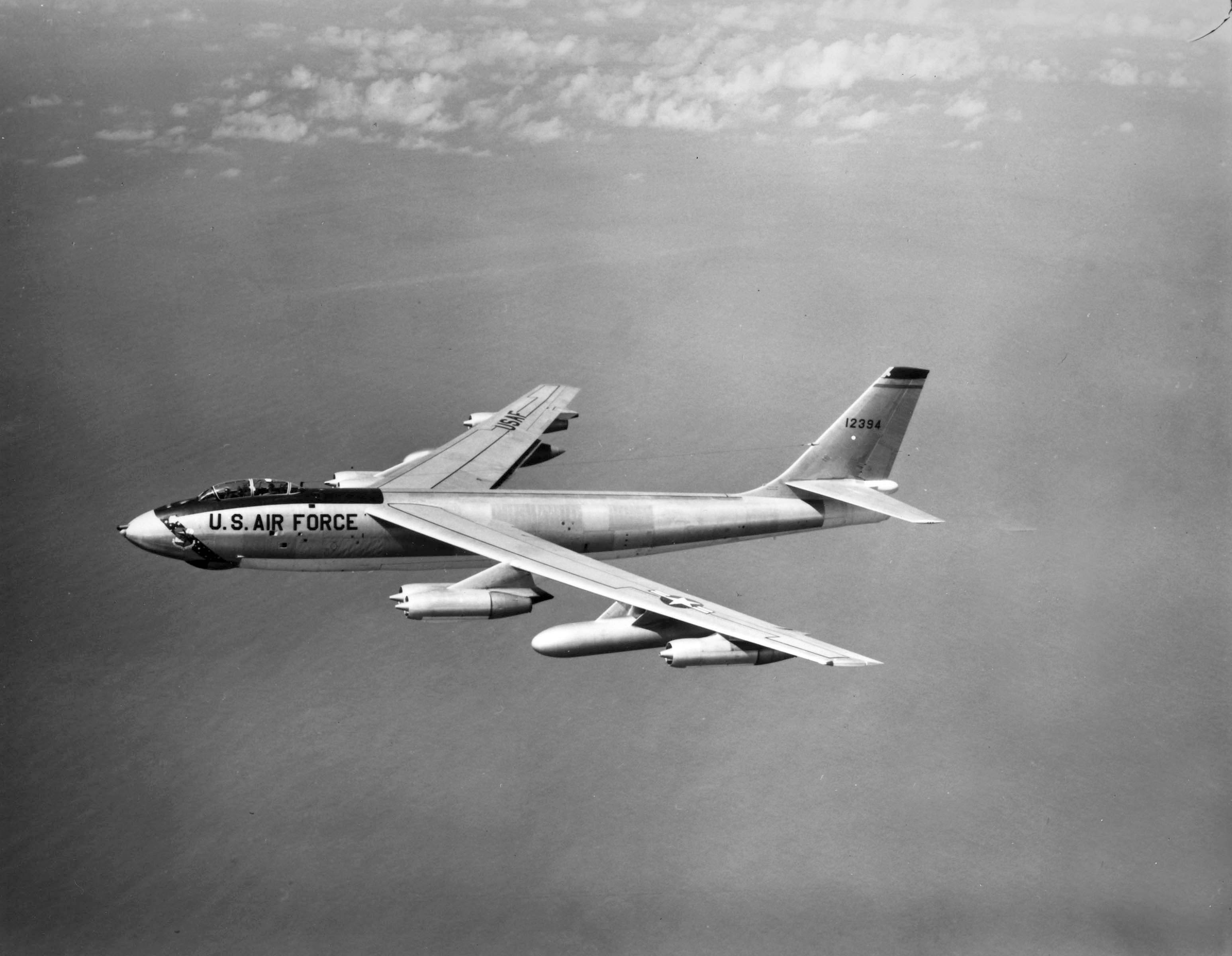
- B-47 Stratojet, last aircraft flown by the squadron (Note: Aircraft is Boeing B-47E-55-BW Stratojet, serial 51-2394. This plane was converted to an NB-47E in March 1960. Dirkx, Marco (24 April 2024). "1952 USAF Serial Numbers". Joe Baugher’s Serial Number List.)
- Active: 1942–1945; 1947–1949; 1952–1963
- Country: United States
- Branch: United States Air Force
- Role: Medium bomber
- Motto: We Go
- Engagements: Mediterranean Theater of Operations
- Decorations: Distinguished Unit Citation

Insignia
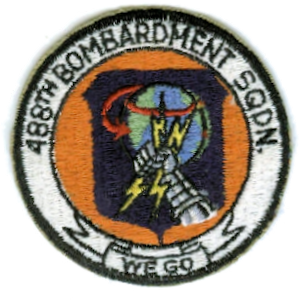
- 488th Bombardment Squadron emblem (Note: Approved 16 September 1954. Description: On a yellow disc an ultramarine blue shield. Issuing from the lower right of the shield a mailed fist proper, grasping two crossed lightning bolts; behind the fist a representation of a world globe, water area light blue, land areas light green. A red arrow encircles the globe, the point of the arrow aimed at a target not designated.)

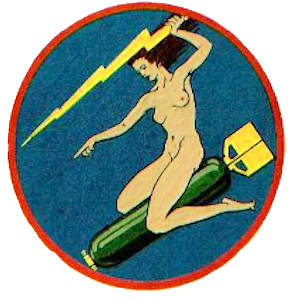
- 488th Bombardment Squadron emblem World War II

The 488th Bombardment Squadron is an inactive United States Air Force unit. It was last assigned to the 340th Bombardment Wing at Whiteman Air Force Base, Missouri, where it was inactivated on 1 September 1963. The squadron was first activated during World War II. After training in the United States, it deployed to the Mediterranean Theater of Operations, where it flew North American B-25 Mitchell medium bombers, primarily on air support and air interdiction missions, earning two Distinguished Unit Citations for its actions. After V-E Day, the squadron returned to the United States, where it was inactivated in November 1945.

The group was again active in the reserve from 1947 to 1949, but does not appear to have been fully manned or equipped with operational aircraft during this period. It was again activated in October 1952, as the Air Force reopened Sedalia Air Force Base, Missouri. It flew Boeing B-47 Stratojets at Sedalia (later Whiteman) until September 1963, as the B-47 began to be withdrawn from Strategic Air Command operations. It was inactivated with the withdrawal of its Stratojets.

== History ==
=== World War II ===
==== Initial organization and training ====
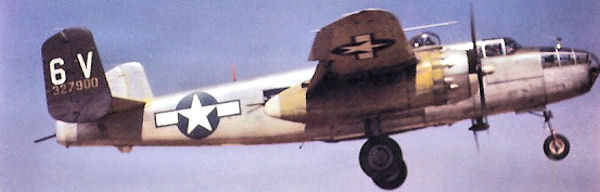
340th Bombardment Group B-25 on landing approach to Gaudo Airfield, Italy in early 1944 (Note: Aircraft is North American B-25J-5-NC, serial 43-27900, Bottoms-Up II.)

The squadron was first activated at Columbia Army Air Base, South Carolina on 20 August 1942 as one of the four original squadrons of the 340th Bombardment Group. However, it was not until September that the squadron received its initial cadre, mostly drawn from the 309th Bombardment Group. It completed Phase I and Phase II training (Note: Phase I training concentrated on individual training in crewmember specialties. Phase II training emphasized the coordination for the crew to act as a team. The final phase concentrated on operation as a unit. Greer, p. 606.) at Columbia with North American B-25 Mitchells, then moved to Walterboro Army Air Field, South Carolina in November, where it completed Phase III training and departed for the Mediterranean Theater of Operations at the end of January 1943.

The squadron's ground echelon travelled by train to Camp Stoneman, California, where it boarded the USS West Point (AP-23) for the combat zone via the Pacific and Indian Oceans. The air echelon travelled by train to Kellogg Field, Michigan, where it received new B-25s to ferry across the Atlantic. It departed Morrison Field, Florida on 25 February 1943.

==== Combat operations ====
The squadron arrived at its first combat base, RAF Kabrit, Egypt in March 1943, with the air echelon arriving between 10 and 20 March and the ground echelon on 29 March. It began combat operations from Medenine Airfield, Tunisia in April, where the 340th Group flew its initial seven missions with the 12th Bombardment Group. Shortly thereafter it moved to Sfax Airfield, Tunisia and began operations on its own. The 488th engaged primarily in air support and interdiction operations, targeting airfields, roads, bridges, road junctions, supply depots and marshalling yards. It participated in Operation Corkscrew, the reduction of defenses in Pantelleria and Lampedusa in June 1943. Although the squadron's operations were hindered by primitive living conditions at its base and unfavorable weather, the squadron supported the British Eighth Army in Tunisia and Allied forces in Operation Husky, the invasion of Sicily. For these actions, it was awarded a Distinguished Unit Citation (DUC).

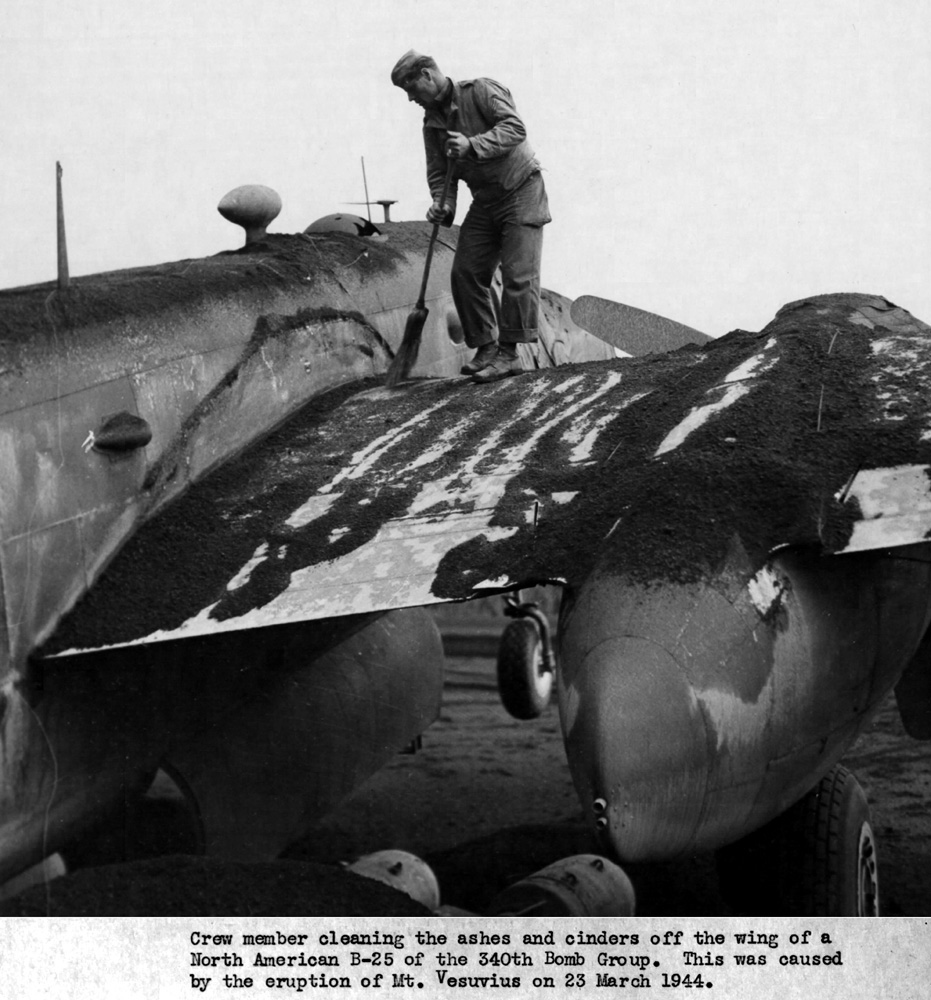
340th Group B-25 Mitchell covered with ash from Mount Vesuvius

As the Germans retreated from Sicily, the squadron attacked their evacuation beaches near Messina the following month. In September, it supported Operation Avalanche, the invasion of Italy near Salerno. During the first six months of 1944, it provided air support for the Allied drive on Rome. In March 1944, Mount Vesuvius erupted, covering 340th Group aircraft at Pompeii Airfield with volcanic ash. As a result, the squadron was forced to move to Gaudo Airfield. (Note: 88 of the 340th Group's Mitchells were destroyed at Pompeii by the eruption.) In April, it moved to Alesan Airfield, on Corsica.

The squadron sometimes bombed strategic targets as well. It operated against factories in Albania, Austria, Bulgaria, France, Greece, Italy, Tunisia and Yugoslavia. After September 1944, these targets included German lines of communication, particularly in the Alps, where it conducted raids on targets in the Brenner Pass. It also engaged in psychological warfare operations, dropping propaganda leaflets behind enemy lines. The squadron received a second DUC for action on 23 September 1944. The Italian Navy was attempting to block access to the heavily defended harbor of La Spezia by sinking a cruiser to block the entrance to the harbor. The squadron attacked and sank the cruiser before it could be maneuvered into position.

Just prior to V-E Day, the squadron returned to Italy, leaving for the United States in July 1945. The air echelon ferried its Mitchells, turning them in upon arrival in the United States. It arrived at Seymour Johnson Field, North Carolina in August, although its personnel were granted leave and the squadron only began to reassemble in September. It returned to Columbia in October, but was inactivated in November.

==== Catch 22 ====
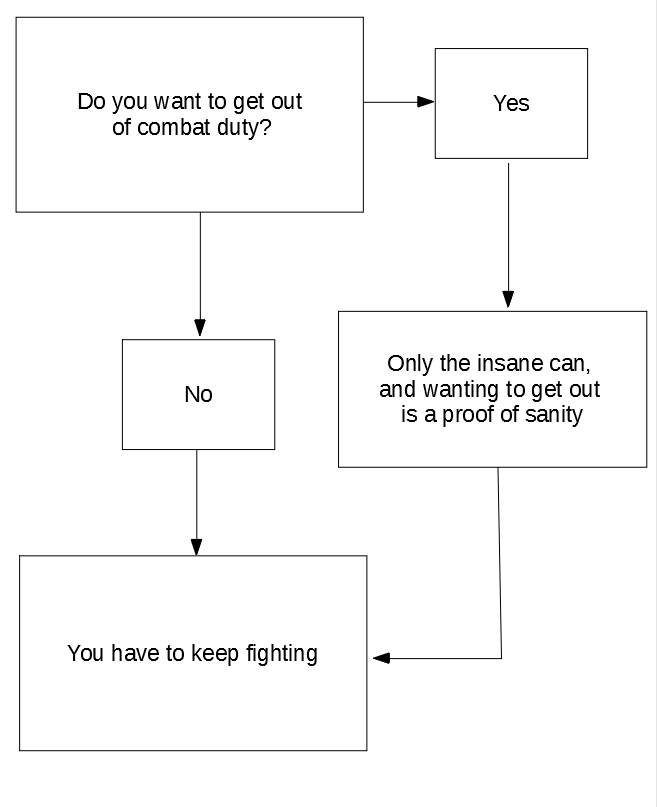
Flowchart showing how Catch-22 works

Joseph Heller was a bombardier with the 488th, flying 60 combat missions with the squadron. His experiences influenced his most famous novel, Catch-22. The protagonist, Yossarian has been referred to as Heller's "alter ego."

=== Reserve operations ===
The 488th Bombardment Squadron was reactivated as a reserve unit under Air Defense Command (ADC) at Tulsa Municipal Airport, Oklahoma on 31 October 1947. It is not clear whether or not the squadron was fully staffed or equipped with operational aircraft. In 1948 Continental Air Command assumed responsibility for managing air reserve and Air National Guard units from ADC. President Truman’s reduced 1949 defense budget required reductions in the number of units in the Air Force, and the 488th was inactivated in August 1949 and not replaced as reserve flying operations at the Tulsa airport ceased.

=== Strategic Air Command ===
In July 1951, Strategic Air Command (SAC) reopened Sedalia Air Force Base, Missouri, which had served as an air transport base during World War II. On 1 August, it activated the 4224th Air Base Squadron to expand the field to accommodate strategic bombers, and on 1 October 1952, the 340th Bombardment Wing, including the 488th Squadron, was activated to replace the 4224th. However, the wing initially concentrated is activities on bringing Sedalia to operational status and the squadron was only nominally manned, and did not become operational until 1954, when it began to receive Boeing B-47 Stratojets.

From 13 September to 3 November 1955, the squadron deployed to the United Kingdom along with the other operational elements of the 340th Wing, which was attached to SAC's 7th Air Division there. Starting in 1957, deployments of entire wings was replaced by Operation Reflex, which placed Stratojets and Boeing KC-97s on alert at bases closer to the Soviet Union for 90 day periods, although individuals rotated back to home bases during unit Reflex deployments After 1958, SAC's Stratojet units began to assume an alert posture at their home bases, reducing the amount of time spent on alert at overseas bases. General Thomas S. Power’s initial goal was to maintain one third of SAC's planes on fifteen minute ground alert, fully fueled and ready for combat to reduce vulnerability to a Soviet missile strike. The SAC alert commitment was increased to half the squadron's aircraft in 1962.

Soon after detection of Soviet missiles in Cuba, SAC brought all degraded and adjusted alert sorties up to full capability. It dispersed its B-47s on 22 October 1962. Most dispersal bases were civilian airfields with Air Force Reserve or Air National Guard units. B-47s were configured for execution of the Emergency War Order as soon as possible after dispersal. On 15 November 1/6 of the dispersed B-47s were recalled to their home bases. On 21 November SAC went to DEFCON 3. Dispersed B-47s and supporting tankers were recalled on 24 November. On 27 November SAC returned to normal alert posture.

In the summer of 1963, the squadron began phasing down its operations at what was now Whiteman Air Force Base in preparation for Whiteman becoming a base for LGM-30 Minuteman intercontinental ballistic missiles and the transfer of the base to the 351st Strategic Missile Wing. The squadron was inactivated on 1 September 1963

== Lineage ==
- Constituted as the 488th Bombardment Squadron (Medium)' on 10 August 1942

Activated on 20 August 1942
Redesignated 488th Bombardment Squadron, Medium c. 20 August 1943
Inactivated on 7 November 1945

- Redesignated 488th Bombardment Squadron, Light on 8 October 1947

Activated in the reserve on 31 October 1947
Inactivated on 19 August 1949

- Redesignated 488th Bombardment Squadron, Medium' on 3 October 1952

Activated on 20 October 1952
Inactivated on 1 September 1963

=== Assignments ===
- 340th Bombardment Group, 20 August 1942 – 7 November 1945
- 340th Bombardment Group, 31 October 1947 – 19 August 1949
- 340th Bombardment Wing, 20 October 1952 – 1 September 1963

=== Stations ===
- Columbia Army Air Base, South Carolina, 20 August 1942
- Walterboro Army Air Field, South Carolina, 1 December 1942 – 30 January 1943
- RAF Kabrit, Egypt, 29 March 1943
- Medenine Airfield, Tunisia, c. 13 April 1943
- Sfax Airfield, Tunisia, 16 April 1943
- Hergla Airfield, Tunisia, 3 June 1943
- Comiso Airfield, Sicily, Italy, c. 2 August 1943
- Catania Airport, Sicily, Italy, 27 August 1943
- San Pancrazio Airfield, Italy 29 October 1943
- Salsola Airfield (Foggia Satellite III), Italy, 25 November 1943
- Pompeii Airfield, Italy, 2 January 1944
- Gaudo Airfield, Italy, 22 March 1944
- Alesan Airfield, Corsica, France, c. 11 April 1944
- Rimini Airfield, Italy, 7 April – 16 July 1945
- Seymour Johnson Field, North Carolina, 9 August 1945
- Columbia Army Air Base, South Carolina, c. 2 October – 7 November 1945
- Tulsa Municipal Airport, Oklahoma, 31 October 1947 – 19 August 1949
- Sedalia Air Force Base (later Whiteman Air Force Base), Missouri, 20 October 1952 – 1 September 1963

=== Aircraft ===
- North American B-25 Mitchell, 1942–1945
- Boeing B-47 Stratojet, 1955–1963

=== Awards and campaigns ===
Award streamer	Award	Dates	Notes
	Distinguished Unit Citation	c. 11 April 1943–17 August 1943	North Africa and Sicily (Note: Maurer only lists the beginning date of the award as April.)
	Distinguished Unit Citation	23 September 1944	Italy

Campaign Streamer	Campaign	Dates	Notes
	Tunisia	c. 12 April 1943 – 13 May 1943	
	Sicily	14 May 1943 – 17 August 1943	
	Naples-Foggia	18 August 1943 – 21 January 1944	
	Anzio	22 January 1944 – 24 May 1944	
	Rome-Arno	22 January 1944 – 9 September 1944	
	Southern France	15 August 1944 – 14 September 1944	
	North Apennines	10 September 1944 – 4 April 1945	
	Po Valley	3 April 1945 – 8 May 1945	
	Air Combat, EAME Theater	c. 12 April 1943 – 11 May 1945	
