= Closing Time (novel) =

1994 novel by Joseph Heller

- Author: Joseph Heller
- Language: English
- Genre: Satire, historical
- Publisher: Simon & Schuster
- Publication date: 1994
- Publication place: United States
- Media type: Print (hardback)
- Pages: 464 pp (1st edition hardback)
- Preceded by: Catch-22
- Followed by: Catch as Catch Can: The Collected Stories and Other Writings

Closing Time is a 1994 novel by Joseph Heller, written as a sequel to his popular 1961 novel Catch-22. It is his sixth novel. It takes place in New York City in the 1990s and revisits some characters of the original, including Yossarian, Milo Minderbinder, and Chaplain Tappman.

The book has two stories that are interwoven throughout: that of Yossarian in the last stages of his life, and that of Sammy Singer and Lew Rabinowitz, two men from Coney Island who also fought in World War II (the Sammy Singer character makes a brief appearance in Catch-22 as the tailgunner aboard Yossarian's bomber who kept waking up and fainting when he saw Yossarian trying to attend to the wounds of Snowden).

As with Catch-22, the topic of death is omnipresent, only in this case from usually age-related illnesses, in particular cancer rather than dying in battle, as with its predecessor. One notable inconsistency in the book is that although Yossarian was 28 in Catch-22, which took place in 1944, in Closing Time Yossarian is 68, and the time of Catch-22 is referred to as "50 years ago". When asked about the inconsistency in an interview with The New York Times, Heller replied, "I know, but I decided to ignore it."

There is a man mentioned by Lew named "Vonnegut", whom he met while in Dresden. This is a reference to Kurt Vonnegut's experiences in the bombing of Dresden and his book Slaughterhouse-Five. A character named Joey Heller is also mentioned who, like the author, was a bombardier during the Second World War and has Guillain–Barré syndrome.

== Plot ==
Closing Time follows John Yossarian of Catch-22, now an elderly man living in late 20th-century New York City, as he confronts old age, illness, and the absurdities of modern life. Yossarian, once a rebellious bombardier in Catch-22, has become a well-paid consultant for a major defense contractor but remains deeply cynical about the world and about his country. He stays mostly in the hospital, where he is found to be perfectly healthy, but stays there anyway. Milo Minderbinder and ex-PFC Wintergreen make appearances as defense contractors, as does Chaplain Tappman, who is retired.

Yossarian finds himself drawn into a secretive and sinister government project involving underground survival bunkers. Yossarian becomes increasingly paranoid about the project, realizing that those in power have prepared for their own survival while leaving the rest of society to fend for itself. Despite his misgivings, he is unable to extricate himself from the system he despises.

== Reception ==
The American review magazine Kirkus said, "Heller has written a sequel to a novel that needed no sequel", and "Heller spends most of the time kvetching about getting old and dying. Hardly any of the old, interesting characters make appearances ...The only connection to the original is that in a few places Heller sets up similar situations and dialogue to show that capitalism and the military mindset are still the same". Furthermore, Heller was "beating a very tired horse."
