= Peter Meineck =

American theatre director and academic (born 1967)

Peter Meineck (born 1967) is Professor of Classics in the Modern World at New York University. He is also the founder and humanities program director of Aquila Theatre and has held appointments at Princeton University and University of South Carolina.

== Early life and education ==
Peter Meineck was born in Melton Mowbray, England and grew up in New Malden in South West London. His mother, Margaret was a primary school teacher and his father David, a builder. He has two older siblings. He attended Glastonbury Junior School in Morden and Beverley Boys School in New Malden and left at age 16 to pursue a military career culminating in service with the Royal Marines Reserve while at University. He earned a BA (Hons) in Ancient World Studies at University College London and a PhD in Classics at the University of Nottingham.

== Career ==
He holds the endowed chair of Professor of Classics in the Modern World at New York University, was Honorary Professor in Humanities at the University of Nottingham and is an affiliated faculty member in Drama at NYU's Tisch School of the Arts. He specializes in Greek drama, performance and literature, cognitive theory applied to antiquity and the performance of trauma in antiquity. He has also held teaching posts at Princeton University, NYU's Tisch School of the Arts, and the University of South Carolina, and was a Visiting Scholar at the University of Texas at Austin. He has held several academic fellowships including at the University of California San Diego, The Harvard Center for Hellenic Studies, The Loeb Classical Library Foundation, The Onassis Foundation, and the TBL Webster Fellowship at the Institute for Classical Studies at the University of London.

Meineck has translated and published several Greek dramas including Aeschylus' Oresteia, Sophocles' Philoctetes, Oedipus at Colonus, Oedipus Tyrannus (with Paul Woodruff), and Ajax, Euripides' Trojan Women, and Herakles and Aristophanes' Clouds, Wasps, Birds and Frogs. He has also adapted the opera libretto for Cherubini's Medee performed at Carnegie Hall and wrote and directed a new stage adaptation of Joseph Heller's Catch-22. He was a consultant on the film I Am Legend and several other movie projects. Other stage adaptations or co-adaptations include Frankenstein, The Odyssey, The Man Who Would Be King, A Female Philoctetes, and The Canterbury Tales.. He has published several books and chapters/articles on ancient performance, cognitive theory applied to antiquity and Greek literature. In 2026 he published a popular book with William Morrow/Harper Collins, Tony Stark Odysseus and the Myths Behind Marvel: Ancient Heroes in the Modern World, which was a National Bestseller.

=== Theatre work ===
Meineck worked extensively in London theatre and founded Aquila Theatre in 1991. His stated aim with Aquila is to bring the greatest works to the greatest number and he has developed a sixty-seventy city American tour that brings classical drama to communities of all sizes across the USA. He also developed regular seasons Off-Broadway in New York City and has produced classical drama at venues such as Carnegie Hall, Lincoln Center, the Ancient Stadium at Delphi, and the Brooklyn Academy of Music. He has directed and/or produced over fifty stage productions including Agamemnon (1991 and 2004 with Olympia Dukakis), Ajax (1992), Wasps (1994), Coriolanus (1995), The Iliad Book One (1999 and 2005), Comedy of Errors (1999, 2003, and 2007), The Invisible Man (2005), Much Ado About Nothing (2001 and 2006), Romeo and Juliet (2007), Prometheus Bound (2007), Catch-22 (2008), An Enemy of the People (2009), Murder on the Nile (2016).

He is the director of Aquila Theatre's public programming and has implemented arts and humanities programs aimed at veteran and civilian dialogues, At-Risk students in Harlem and The Bronx, and underserved communities via public libraries. His public programs received a Chairman's Special Award from the National Endowment for the Humanities and have been presented at the Obama and Bush White Houses, the U.S. Supreme Court, U.S. Congress, Metropolitan Museum of Art, Federal Hall National Memorial and throughout the United States. He has testified before the US Congress on behalf on the National Endowment for the Humanities and Aquila's plays and projects have been performed at the Bush and Obama White Houses.

== Personal life ==
Meineck married Desiree Sanchez in 2004. He serves as a volunteer firefighter and EMT and Technical Rescue Special Operations Team member in New York.

== Awards ==
- 1999: USC Honors College Mortar Board Teaching Award
- 2000: Louis Galantiere Award for Oresteia, American Translators Association
- 2009: New York University Arts and Science Golden Dozen Teaching Award
- 2010: National Endowment for the Humanities Chairman's Special Award.
- 2011: American Philological Association Award for Outreach.

== Published works (books) ==
- Oresteia, with Helene P. Foley (Hackett Publishing Company, 1998)
- Aristophanes 1 : The Clouds, Wasps, Birds (Hackett, 1998)
- Oedipus Tyrannus with Paul Woodruff (Hackett, 2000)
- Clouds (Hackett, 2000)
- The trials of Socrates : six classic texts, with C D C Reeve and James Doyle (Hackett, 2002)
- Theban Plays with Paul Woodruff (Hackett, 2003)
- Four Tragedies: Electra, Philoctetes, Ajax, The Women of Trachis with Paul Woodruff (Hackett, 2007)
- The Electra Plays, with Paul Woodruff and Cecelia Eaton Luschnig (Hackett, 2009)
- Combat Trauma and The Ancient Greeks, with David Konstan, Palgrave MacMillan, 2014.
- Philoctetes, Hackett Publishing Company, 2014.
- Theatrocracy: Greek Drama, Cognition and the Imperative for Theatre, Routledge, 2017.
- "The Routledge Handbook of Classics and Cognitive Theory", Routledge, 2019.
- "Aristophanes' Frogs", Hackett Publishing Company, 2021.
- "Tony Stark, Odysseus and the Myths Behind Marvel: Ancient Heroes in the Modern World", William Morrow/Harper Collins 2026.
- "Performing Catharsis: Enacting an Ancient Therapy", Routledge 2026.

== Selected chapters and journal articles ==
- "Forsaking the Fidelity Discourse". in Liapis, V. and Sidiropoulou, A. eds., Adapting Greek Tragedy: Contemporary Contexts for Ancient Texts. Cambridge University Press 2020.
- "Masks". In The Routledge Companion to Health Humanities (pp. 292–295). Routledge, 2020.
- "The Warrior Chorus program. THE ROUTLEDGE COMPANION TO HEALTH HUMANITIES, p.54, 2020,
- "Post-conflict resolution and the health humanities: The Warrior Chorus program". In The Routledge Companion to Health Humanities (pp. 54–59). Routledge, 2020,
- "Classics". In The Routledge Companion to Health Humanities (pp. 267–270). Routledge, 2020,
- "The Remains of Ancient Action: Understanding affect and empathy in Greek drama." In The Routledge Companion to Theatre, Performance, and Cognitive Science, pp. 66–74. Routledge, 2018.
- “The Greek Mask as Material Engagement Mind Tool” in A History of Distributed Cognition Vol. 1., Miranda Anderson and Douglas Cairns (eds.), Edinburgh

University Press 2017

- “Thebes as High Collateral Damage Target: Moral Accountability for Killing in Seven Against Thebes” in Aeschylus and War: Comparative Perspectives on Seven Against Thebes, Isabelle Torrance (Ed.), Routledge, 2017.
- “Cognitive Theory and Aeschylus: Translating Beyond the Lexicon” in The Reception of Aeschylus’ Plays Through Shifting Models and Frontiers, Stratos E.

Constantinidis (ed.), Brill 2016.

- "Greek drama in North America" in The Encyclopedia on the Reception of Ancient Greek Drama, Betine Van Zyl Smit (ed.), Wiley Blackwell, 2016.
- “Combat Trauma and the Tragic Stage: “Restoration” by Cultural Catharsis” in Caston. V., and Weinecke S. (eds.) Our Ancient Wars, University of Michigan Press, 2016.
- Foreword for Aeschylus’ The Seven, translated by Jonathan Tipton, Flood Editions, 2015.
- “The Thorniest Problem and the Greatest Opportunity: Directors on Directing the Greek Chorus. Chapter in Choral Mediations in Greek Tragedy, Renauld Gagné, Marianne Hopman (eds.) Cambridge University Press, 2013.
- "The Encyclopedia of Greek Tragedy", Hanna Roismann (ed.). Wiley- Blackwell, 2013

Entries: Dwellings Furniture Masks Staging of Euripides Staging of Modern Productions Stage Set Stage Vehicles Statues Theatre Architecture Theatrical Space

- “Under Athena’s Gaze: The topography of opsis in Aeschylus’ Eumenides” in Performance in Greek and Roman Drama, George W.M. Harrison & Vayos Liapis

(eds.) Brill, 2013.

- "A great ox is standing on my tongue" in Out of Silence: Censorship in American Theater, Caridad Svich (ed.), Eye Corner Press, 2012.
- "Aeschylus’ Eumenides and Aristophanes’ Clouds" in Readings in Classical Political Thought, P. T. Steinberger (ed.) Hackett Publishing, 2000
