= Catch as Catch Can =

Catch as catch can may refer to:

- Catch wrestling, also known as Catch As Catch Can Wrestling
- Catch as Catch Can (album), a 1983 album by Kim Wilde
- Catch as Catch Can: The Collected Stories and Other Writings, by Joseph Heller
- Catch-As-Catch-Can (1927 film), an American film directed by Charles Hutchison
- Catch as Catch Can (1937 film), a British film starring James Mason
- Catch as Catch Can (1967 film), an Italian film
- "Catch as Catch Can", an episode of the TV series WordGirl

== See also ==
- Catch as Cash Can, an episode of DuckTales
- Catch as Cats Can, a 1947 animated cartoon featuring caricatures of Frank Sinatra and Bing Crosby
