= Speed Vogel =

American painter

Irving "Speed" Vogel (March 3, 1918 – April 14, 2008) was an American sculptor, painter, and co-author, along with Joseph Heller, of the best-selling memoir, No Laughing Matter.

He was born in New York City and was the fourth of five children of his father Julius, who was a builder. He was educated at West Virginia University and attended pre-med classes at New York University but, with the beginning of World War II, started working as a shipbuilder. Vogel started his own textile business, Ria Herlinger Fabrics, with his first wife. Later, he became a furniture producer and left this business at a relatively early age when he retired. After retirement, he dedicated himself to painting and sculpting.

A textile businessman and associate of Gwathmey Siegel, he was also a member of the "Gourmet Club," an assemblage of writers, artists and show business people (which included Mel Brooks and Mario Puzo, among others), who gathered weekly from the 1960s to the 1980s to eat and talk at Chinese restaurants in New York City.

In the 1960s, Vogel met Joseph Heller, best known for his novel Catch-22, and they became good friends. In 1982, Heller was diagnosed with Guillain–Barré syndrome, which provokes paralysis. Vogel moved into Heller's house to help him recover. They alternatively wrote the chapters in their best-seller No Laughing Matter, which was published in 1986. The book was on the New York Times best-seller list for four weeks.

He had five children from his three marriages. Vogel died of natural causes at his home in Sag Harbor, New York. He was 90.
