= No Laughing Matter =

No Laughing Matter may refer to:

- No Laughing Matter (book), an autobiographical work by Joseph Heller about his Guillain–Barré syndrome
- "No Laughing Matter", an episode from season nine of the M*A*S*H TV series
- "No Laughing Matter" (Garfield and Friends), an episode from the second season of Garfield and Friends
- "No Laughing Matter", a season 2 episode of The Loud House
