= Catch-22 (play) =

- Original language: English
- Written by: Joseph Heller
- Characters: John Yossarian; Chaplain Tappman; Milo Minderbinder; Captain Black; Doc Daneeka; McWatt
- Genre: Satire, Drama
- Setting: Italy

Premiere
- Date: 1971
- Place: United States

Catch-22 is a satirical play by the American author Joseph Heller, first produced in 1971 and based on his 1961 novel of the same name.

== Plot ==
The story follows Captain John Yossarian, a U.S. Army Air Forces B-25 bombardier, and a number of other characters. Most events occur while the airmen of the Fighting 256th (or "two to the fighting eighth power") Squadron are based on the island of Pianosa, west of Italy. Many events in the story are repeatedly described from differing points of view, so the reader learns more about the event from each iteration. Furthermore, the events are referred to as if the reader already knows all about them. The pacing of Catch-22 is frenetic, its tenor intellectual, and its humor largely absurd, though interspersed with moments of grisly realism.

== Production history ==
Heller adapted his book for the stage in 1971, condensing its 500 pages and 50 named characters into two hours of stage time for a cast of nine. The existence of the author's adaptation means it is almost impossible for others to get adapting rights, and, in order to stage Catch-22, Heller's version has to be used.

Until recently, the adaptation had had only limited success and had never been performed on Broadway as originally intended. However, Aquila Theatre produced a stage adaptation of Catch-22 directed by Peter Meineck and based on Heller's own 1971 version. This production toured the United States in 2007-2008, and a production began in New York City in November at the Lucille Lortel Theatre, opening on November 23, 2008.

A section based on events in Chapter 8 of the book Catch-22 was removed from the play to shorten its running time, and published as separate short one-act play, Clevinger's Trial, which has been produced occasionally.
