= Face of a Hero =

1950 novel by Louis Falstein

- First edition
- Author: Louis Falstein
- Language: English
- Publisher: Harcourt, Brace
- Publication date: 1950
- Publication place: United States
- Media type: Print (hardcover)
- Pages: 312 pp
- OCLC: 1690364

Face of a Hero is a novel written by American writer Louis Falstein and published in 1950. Though out of print for a long time, interest in this narrative, dealing with the war experience of a B-24 tail gunner in Southern Europe during the Second World War was rekindled when it was suggested that it inspired Joseph Heller while writing Catch-22, his well-known war novel.

== Plot ==
The novel is told by a first-person narrator, a 36-year-old American airman of Jewish descent, Ben Isaacs, who had worked as a teacher before volunteering for the Air Force. He has been assigned to the new crew of a B-24 Liberator heavy bomber, called "Flying Foxhole", as tail gunner, and sent to Mandia, an air base in Apulia, southern Italy, in the summer of 1944. Isaacs is frightened by his first bomb run, which is against the well-defended industrial area of Wiener Neustadt in Austria. He feels alienated from his crew because he is older than them, and also because he is the only Jew on the bomber. He manages to get accustomed to the terrifying flights over Nazi-occupied Europe, and to establish some camaraderie with the rest of the crew.

The life of the American airmen is described in detail, and Falstein focuses on the relations with the "natives", that is, the Italian people of Apulia, hindered by the linguistic barrier, and the sometimes uneasy relations between airmen from different parts of the United States and different ethnic backgrounds (one of the gunners, Cosmo Fidanza, is the son of an Italian immigrant coming from Bari, the capital of the region). The novel also analyses the psychological burden put on the airmen by the repeated stress of the bomb runs, which leads to alcohol abuse and brings some of them (such as Cosmo) to the verge of breakdown.

=== Crew of the "Flying Foxhole" ===
- 1st Lt. Albert Pennington Jr aka "Big Wheel", pilot - later replaced by 2nd Lt. George "Casey Jones" Petersen
- Lt. Chet Kowalski, co-pilot - replaced by Lt. Oscar Schiller
- Lt. Andy Kyle, navigator
- Dick Martin, bombardier
- Cosmo Fidanza, ball turret gunner - replaced by Charley Couch
- Ben Isaacs, tail gunner
- Jack Dula (called "Dooley"), flight-engineer
- Leo Trent, waist-gunner
- Billy Poat, radio-gunner
- Mel Ginn, nose gunner

== Controversy about Catch-22 ==
In April 1998, Lewis Pollock, a London bibliophile, wrote to The Sunday Times asking how "characters, personality traits, eccentricities, physical descriptions, personnel injuries and incidents" depicted in Catch-22 could be so similar to those in Louis Falstein's Face of a Hero (published in the United Kingdom in 1951 as The Sky is a Lonely Place), and wondering whether this could be a case of plagiarism, inasmuch as Heller wrote the first chapter of Catch-22 (1953) while he was a student at Oxford, when Falstein's novel had already been available for two years. The Times noticed that there are similarities between the two books: "both have central characters who are using their wits to escape the aerial carnage; both are haunted by an omnipresent injured airman, invisible inside a white body cast". Heller said that he had never read Falstein's novel or heard of him and said, "My book came out in 1961[;] I find it funny that nobody else has noticed any similarities, including Falstein himself, who died just last year".

1. "Heller introduces the soldier in white who "was encased from head to toe in plaster and gauze" in chapter one. He continues, He had two useless legs and two useless arms and had been smuggled into the ward at night. Later in his book, Falstein also has a soldier in white who looked entombed in the cast, like an Egyptian mummy. This invalid is the crew's new pilot, wounded in action. In Catch-22 the figure is as mysterious and as metaphorical as the Unknown Soldier".

2. In Falstein's book a character sleeps with five cats. In Heller's book, Hungry Joe dreamed that Huple's cat was sleeping on his face, suffocating him, and when he woke up, Huple's cat was sleeping on his face.

3. Falstein's Isaacs and Heller's Yossarian take extra flak jackets into combat as did many flight crews.

4. A holiday party ends in gunfire in both books.

5. There is a rape scene with some similarity in both books.

Falstein and Heller flew bomber missions in southern Italy and Corsica during the Second World War, so it is understandable that their stories might have similarities.

There are also remarkable differences in the two writers' approach to their war experience. Falstein uses a more traditional narrative style, with a linear plot and well-written prose aiming at a realistic description of events and the narrator's feelings, while Heller adopts a fragmented non-linear plot and deliberately repetitive prose whose obsessive rhythm underscores the absurdity of his characters' predicament. Several scenes of Heller's novel are surrealistic, while Falstein always strives to achieve verisimilitude.

Because of the controversy, Falstein's novel was reprinted in March 1999 by Steerforth Press.
