= Portrait of an Artist, as an Old Man =

2000 novel by Joseph Heller

- First edition cover
- Author: Joseph Heller
- Publisher: Simon & Schuster
- Publication date: June 12, 2000
- Pages: 224
- ISBN: 0-7432-0200-7

Portrait of an Artist, as an Old Man is a novel by American writer Joseph Heller, published posthumously in 2000. It is his seventh novel. His final work, it depicts an elderly author as he tries to write a novel that is as successful as his earlier work, mirroring Heller's own career after the success of Catch-22.

== Plot ==
The story is of Eugene Pota, a prominent writer who, in his old age, is struggling for that last piece of fiction that could be his magnum opus, or at least on par with his earlier writings. Littered throughout the novel are many of Pota's ideas and drafts of possible stories, such as the sexual biography of his wife, or of Hera's trouble with Zeus.

== Reception ==
Critical reception to the novel was mixed. Michiko Kakutani, chief book critic for The New York Times, judged that "skills Heller did possess in abundance at the height of his career are also sorely lacking in this novel", and called it "a sad coda to a distinguished career." Tim Adams, writing for The Guardian, was more positive, calling it a "moderate success" and describing it as a "caustic self-parody".
