= Picture This (novel) =

1988 novel by Joseph Heller

- First edition
- Author: Joseph Heller
- Language: English
- Genre: Historical novel
- Publisher: Putnam
- Publication date: 1988
- Publication place: United States
- Media type: Print (Hardcover and Paperback)
- Pages: 352 p.
- ISBN: 0-399-13355-0
- OCLC: 17648856
- Dewey Decimal: 813/.54 19
- LC Class: PS3558.E476 P5 1988

Picture This is a 1988 novel from Joseph Heller, the satiric author of the acclaimed Catch-22. It is his fifth novel.

== Plot ==
The novel is an eclectic historical journey across multiple periods of history, all connected by a single painting: Rembrandt van Rijn's Aristotle Contemplating a Bust of Homer. The work jumps from the golden age of Athens, to 17th Century Holland, to the rise of the American Empire; hopscotching from Aristotle, to Rembrandt, to Socrates, and back to Heller and Jimmy Carter. It examines fundamental dichotomies in human existence under the guise of satire.

== Major themes ==
Heller concludes that we do not learn from history (and in fact so much of history may be nonfactual that learning may be impossible). Being a pessimist chronicler of the American Century, his main unspoken theme is of course parallels between the onetime Hellenic overlord respective the onetime ruler of the seas, and his home country.

This is most apparent in his treatment of the peak and downfall of Athens, when after the victory over Persia, Athens formed the Delian League, and got embroiled in the Peloponnesian War. Heller describes a beacon of democracy that destroys its own greatest advances or transforms them into tools of abuse, turns on its own allies just to demonstrate its power, and loses to weaker enemies due to self-deception.
