= Aquila Theatre =

The Aquila Theatre was founded in London in 1991 by Peter Meineck and has been based in New York City since 1999. Aquila's mission is to bring the greatest theatrical works to the greatest number and present a regular season of plays in New York and at international festivals. Education programming is an important component of Aquila's mission. The Shakespeare Leaders is a bold and innovative program in Harlem, through which students learn and perform Shakespeare. Aquila provides access for people in under-served urban and rural communities, touring around seventy American towns and cities a year. Aquila is a 501(c)(3) not-for-profit organisation.

== Past productions ==
Wuthering Heights, A Female Philoctetes, Twelfth Night, Fahrenheit 451, Herakles, Cyrano de Bergerac, Taming of the Shrew, Macbeth, The Importance of Being Earnest, Six Characters in Search of an Author, A Midsummer Night's Dream, As You Like It, An Enemy of the People, The Iliad, The Comedy of Errors, Catch-22, Julius Caesar, Prometheus Bound with David Oyelowo, Romeo & Juliet, The Canterbury Tales, Much Ado About Nothing, Hamlet, The Strange Case of Dr. Jekyll & Mr. Hyde, H G Wells' The Invisible Man, with choreographer Doug Varone, Twelfth Night, A Very Naughty Greek Play, Oedipus at Colonus, with Bill Pullman, The Man Who Would Be King, Othello (2004), Agamemnon, with Olympia Dukakis, The Importance of Being Earnest, A Midsummer Night's Dream, The Tempest, The Wrath of Achilles, Cyrano de Bergerac, King Lear, Oedipus the King, The Odyssey, The Birds, Macbeth, The Wasps, Coriolanus, Ajax, The Frogs, and The Clouds.

== New York season ==
Aquila recently presented A Female Philoctetes, a new play based on Sophocles' classic Philoctetes at Brooklyn Academy of Music Fisher's Hillman Studio. Previous presentations include Herakles at Brooklyn Academy of Music's Fisher, Joseph Heller's Catch-22, Homer's Iliad at the Lucille Lortel Theatre and a New Translations Reading Series exploring the works of contemporary American translators.

== Educational initiatives ==
Aquila is the professional company in residence at the Center for Ancient Studies at New York University and a NYC Board of Education vendor for Arts Education Services. While touring, Aquila presents special school performances, talk-backs, master classes, workshops, and on-site school visits, reaching 15,000–20,000 middle and high school students. In 2006, Aquila developed the Shakespeare Leaders program with support from the Charles Hayden Foundation. Aquila's Young Audience company recently produced special education programs, in conjunction with the Lincoln Center Institute for Arts & Education, at schools in the New York City metropolitan area.

== Collaborations ==
Aquila works with artists from many other disciplines such as film, TV, opera, classical music and dance, including Olympia Dukakis, Bill Pullman, Mikis Theodorakis, Peter Tiboris, Doug Varone, Ralph Farris and David Oyelowo.
