= Clevinger's Trial =

1973 short dark comedy play

Clevinger's Trial is a 1973 short dark comedy play in one act by Joseph Heller.

Clevinger's Trial is based on Chapter 8 of Heller's 1961 novel Catch-22. It is excerpted from the 1971 play Catch-22, being cut from the original version of Catch-22 to shorten that play's running time and published as a separate one-act play, running about 15 minutes.

The play is a satire of institutional justice. The action, which is a close copy of the same scene in the novel Catch-22, concerns a kangaroo court court-martial of air cadet Clevinger on various nonsensical charges. Lieutenant Scheisskopf (English: Shithead) is both prosecutor and defender, and also one of the judges and Clevinger's commanding officer. During the trial, Scheisskopf rises in rank while almost everyone else present (including the court stenographer) is found guilty of something and sentenced to punishment.

Clevinger's Trial was produced in London in 1974, and in 1993 by the Griffin Theatre Company of Chicago, where critic Jack Helbig decried the short running time as the "worst deal in Chicago late-night theater... no sooner do we become adjusted to Heller's satirical-absurdist universe with its thinly veiled attacks on cold-war paranoia than the play's over."
