= No Laughing Matter (book) =

- First edition
- Author: Joseph Heller & Speed Vogel
- Language: English
- Genre: Autobiography
- Publisher: G. P. Putnam's Sons
- Publication date: 1986
- Publication place: United States
- Media type: Print (Hardback)
- Pages: 335 pp
- ISBN: 978-0-7432-4717-7
- OCLC: 57666812

No Laughing Matter is a 1986 book co-authored by Joseph Heller and Speed Vogel. The book covers Heller's struggle with Guillain–Barré syndrome from 1981 to 1982, as well as the experience of Vogel, Heller's longtime friend, helping with Heller's rehabilitation and serving as his public face during that time. Heller and Vogel wrote alternating chapters.

== History ==
On Sunday, December 13, 1981, Heller was diagnosed with Guillain–Barré syndrome, a debilitating syndrome that was to leave him temporarily paralyzed. He was admitted to the Intensive Care Unit of Mount Sinai Hospital the same day, and remained there, bedridden, until his condition had improved enough to permit his transfer to the Rusk Institute of Rehabilitation Medicine in January 1982.

The book reveals the assistance and companionship Heller received during this period from some of his prominent friends—Mel Brooks, Mario Puzo, Dustin Hoffman and George Mandel among them.

Heller eventually made a substantial recovery. In 1984, he divorced his wife of 35 years, Shirley, to marry Valerie Humphries, the nurse who had helped him to recover.

Speed Vogel writes of helping Heller, his friend for twenty years, through his rehabilitation. The pair write alternating chapters, which chronicle Vogel's rise through society as he stands in for Heller, even traveling to the Cannes Film Festival, while at the same time Heller is becoming more helpless.

Although Heller's disease is debilitating, he uses humor and avoids self-pity in this work.

Heller does regret letting an insurance policy lapse, resulting in out-of-pocket expenses of around $120,000 in medical costs.
