= Catch as Catch Can: The Collected Stories and Other Writings =

2003 collection of writings by Joseph Heller

- First edition (publ. Simon & Schuster)
- Editor: Matthew J. Bruccoli and Park Bucker
- Author: Joseph Heller
- Genre: Short story collection
- Publisher: Simon & Schuster
- Publication date: January 1, 2003
- ISBN: 978-0-743-24374-2

Catch As Catch Can: The Collected Stories and Other Writings is a 2003 collection of writings by Joseph Heller, author of Catch-22.

== List of writings ==
=== Previously published stories ===
- "I Don't Love You Any More" (1945)
- "Bookies, Beware!" (1947)
- "Lot's Wife" (1948)
- "Castle of Snow" (1948)
- "Girl from Greenwich" (1948)
- "A Man Named Flute" (1948)
- "Nothing to Be Done" (1948)
- "World Full of Great Cities" (1955)
- "MacAdam's Log" (1959)
- "Love, Dad" (1969)
- "Yossarian Survives" (1987)
- "Catch-23" (1990)
- "The Day Bush Left" (1990)
- "The Principal of Rivington Street" (2011)

=== Previously unpublished stories ===
- "To Laugh in the Morning"
- "A Day in the Country"
- "From Dawn to Dusk"
- "The Death of the Dying Swan"
- "The Sound of Asthma"

=== Play ===
- "Clevinger's Trial" (1973)

=== Essays on Catch-22 ===
- "Catch-22 Revisited" (1967)
- "Joseph Heller Talks About Catch-22" (1972)
- "Reeling In Catch-22" (1977)
- "I Am the Bombardier!" (1995)
