= Joseph Heller =

American writer (1923–1999)

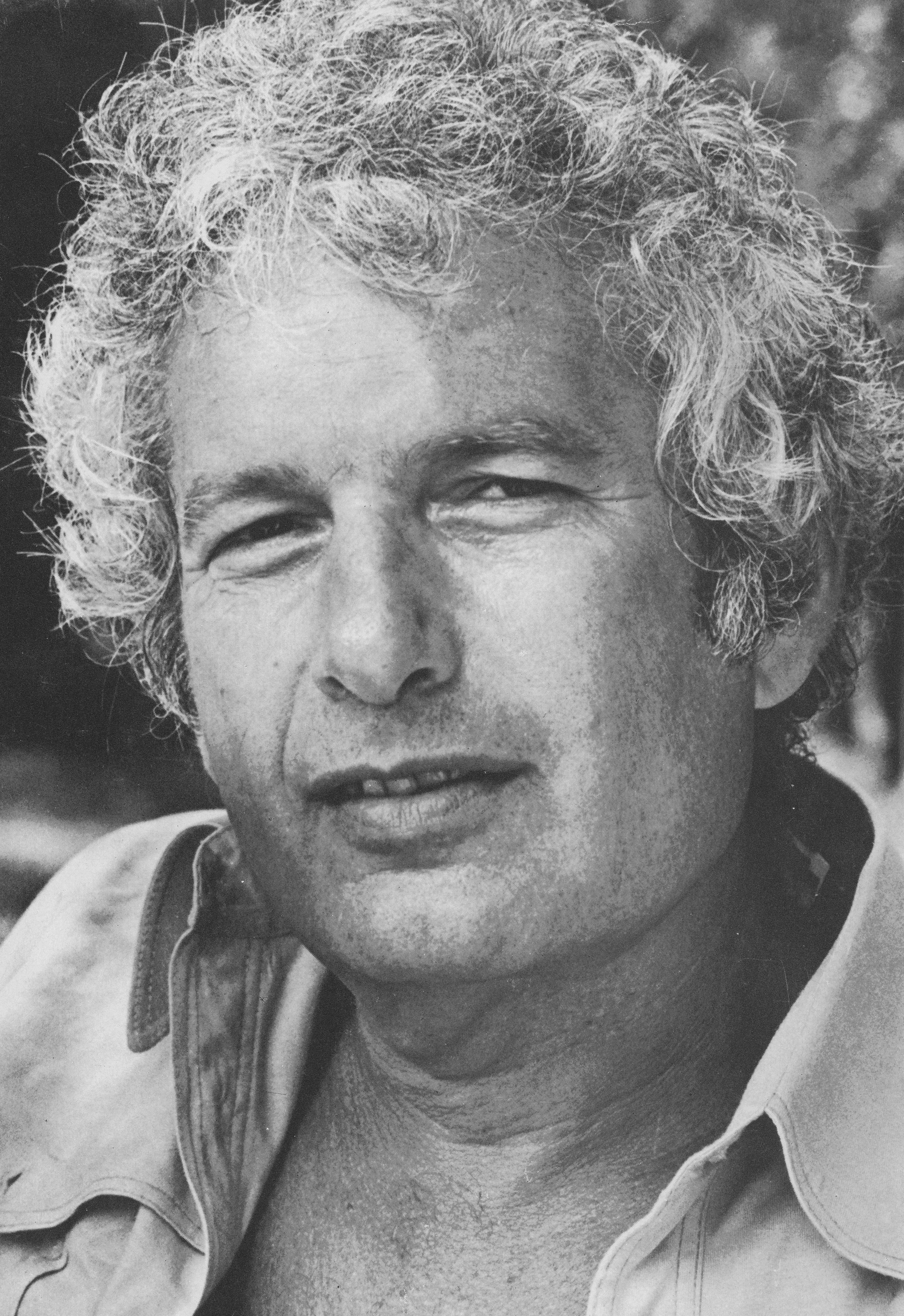
- Heller c. 1979
- Born: May 1, 1923; New York City, U.S.
- Died: December 12, 1999 (aged 76); East Hampton, New York, U.S.
- Resting place: Cedar Lawn Cemetery; East Hampton, New York, U.S.
- Education: New York University (BA); Columbia University (MA)
- Occupation: Writer
- Spouse(s): Shirley Held (m. 1945; div. 1984) Valerie Humphries (m. 1989)
- Children: 2
- Writing career
- Genres: Satire, black comedy
- Notable works: Catch-22, Something Happened

Signature
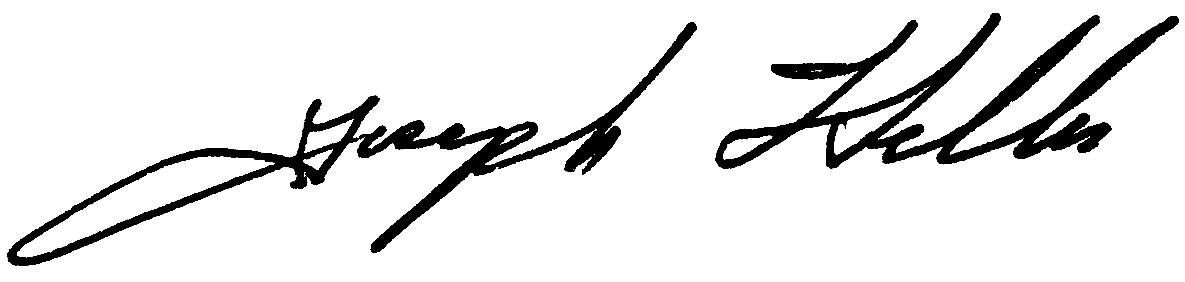

Joseph Heller (May 1, 1923 – December 12, 1999) was an American author of novels, short stories, plays, and screenplays. His best-known work is his debut novel Catch-22 (1961), a satire on war and bureaucracy, whose title has become a synonym for an absurd or contradictory choice. He was nominated for the Nobel Prize in Literature twice, in 1972 and 1975.

== Early life ==
Heller was born on May 1, 1923, in Coney Island in Brooklyn, New York City, the son of poor Jewish parents, Lena and Isaac Donald Heller from Russia. As a teenager, he wrote a story about the Soviet invasion of Finland and sent it to the New York Daily News, which rejected it. After graduating from Abraham Lincoln High School in 1941, Heller spent the next year working as a blacksmith's apprentice, a messenger boy, and a filing clerk.

In 1942, at age 19, he joined the U.S. Army Air Corps. Two years later he was sent to the Italian Front, where he flew 60 combat missions as a B-25 bombardier. His unit was the 488th Bombardment Squadron, 340th Bomb Group, 12th Air Force. Heller later remembered the war as "fun in the beginning ... You got the feeling that there was something glorious about it." On his return home he "felt like a hero ... People think it quite remarkable that I was in combat in an airplane and I flew sixty missions even though I tell them that the missions were largely milk runs."

After the war, Heller studied English at the University of Southern California and then New York University on the G.I. Bill, graduating from the latter institution in 1948. In 1949, he received his M.A. in English from Columbia University. Following his graduation from Columbia, he spent a year as a Fulbright scholar in St Catherine's Society, Oxford before teaching English composition at Pennsylvania State University for two years (1950–52). He then briefly worked for Time Inc., before taking a job as a copywriter at a small advertising agency, where he worked alongside future novelist Mary Higgins Clark. At home, Heller wrote. He was first published in 1948, when The Atlantic ran one of his short stories. The story nearly won the "Atlantic First".

== Career ==
=== Catch-22 ===
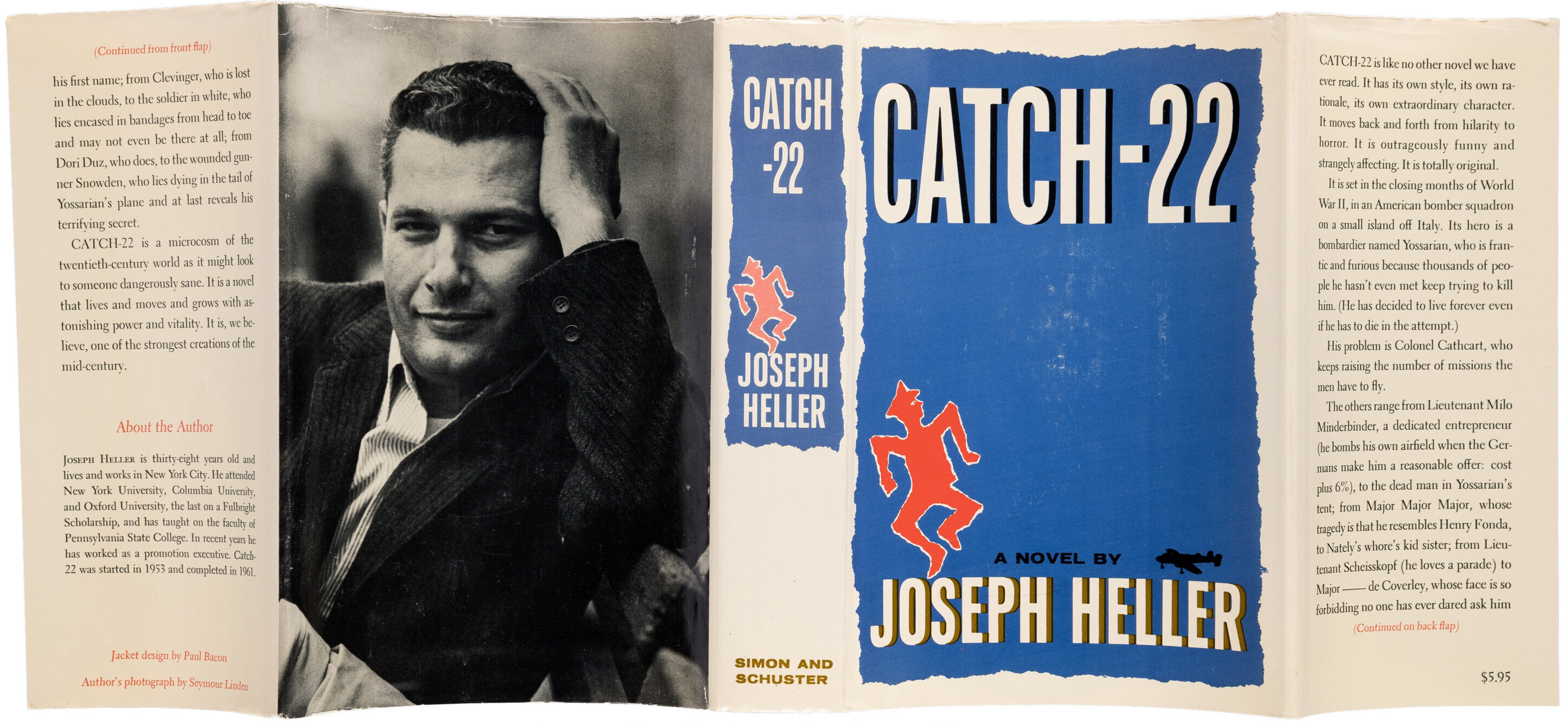
Catch-22 dust jacket, first edition (1961)

While sitting at home one morning in 1953, Heller thought of the lines, "It was love at first sight. The first time he saw the chaplain, [Yossarian] fell madly in love with him." Within the next day, he began to envision the story that could result from this beginning, and invented the characters, the plot, and the tone that the story would eventually take. Within a week, he had finished the first chapter and sent it to his agent. He did not do any more writing for the next year, as he planned the rest of the story. The initial chapter was published in 1955 as "Catch-18", in Issue 7 of New World Writing.

Although he originally intended the story to be no longer than a novelette, Heller was able to add enough substance to the plot that he felt it could become his first novel. When he was one-third done with the work, his agent, Candida Donadio, sent it to publishers. Heller was not particularly attached to the work, and decided that he would not finish it if publishers were not interested. The work was soon purchased by Simon & Schuster, which gave him US$750 and promised him an additional $750 when the full manuscript was delivered. Heller missed his deadline by four to five years, but, after eight years of thought, delivered the novel to his publisher.

The finished novel describes the wartime experiences of Army Air Corps Captain John Yossarian. Yossarian devises multiple strategies to avoid combat missions, but the military bureaucracy is always able to find a way to make him stay. As Heller observed, "Everyone in my book accuses everyone else of being crazy. Frankly, I think the whole society is nuts – and the question is: What does a sane man do in an insane society?"

Just before publication in 1961, the novel's title was changed to Catch-22 to avoid confusion with Leon Uris' new novel, Mila 18. The novel was published in hardback in 1961 to mixed reviews, with the Chicago Sun-Times calling it "the best American novel in years", while other critics derided it as "disorganized, unreadable, and crass". It sold only 30,000 hardback copies in the United States in its first year of publication. Reaction was very different in the UK, where, within one week of its publication, the novel was number one on the bestseller lists. In the years after its release in paperback in October 1962, however, Catch-22 caught the imaginations of many baby boomers, who identified with the novel's anti-war sentiments. The book went on to sell 10 million copies in the United States. The novel's title became a standard term in English and other languages for a dilemma with no easy way out. Now considered a classic, the book was listed at number 7 on Modern Library's list of the top 100 novels of the century. The United States Air Force Academy uses the novel to "help prospective officers recognize the dehumanizing aspects of bureaucracy."

The movie rights to the novel were purchased in 1962, and, combined with his royalties, made Heller a millionaire. The film, which was directed by Mike Nichols and starred Alan Arkin, Jon Voight, Art Garfunkel and Orson Welles, was not released until 1970.

In April 1998, Lewis Pollock wrote to The Sunday Times for clarification as to "the amazing similarity of characters, personality traits, eccentricities, physical descriptions, personnel injuries and incidents" in Catch-22 and a novel published in England in 1951. The book that spawned the request was written by Louis Falstein and titled The Sky Is a Lonely Place in Britain and Face of a Hero in the United States. Falstein's novel was available two years before Heller wrote the first chapter of Catch-22 (1953). The Times stated: "Both have central characters who are using their wits to escape the aerial carnage; both are haunted by an omnipresent injured airman, invisible inside a white body cast". Stating he had never read Falstein's novel, or heard of him, Heller said: "My book came out in 1961[;] I find it funny that nobody else has noticed any similarities, including Falstein himself, who died just last year".

=== Other works ===
Heller's other works are mostly modern satire which center on the lives of members of the middle class.

Shortly after Catch-22 was published, Heller thought of an idea for his next novel, which would become Something Happened, but did not act on it for two years. In the meantime he focused on scripts, completing the final screenplay for the movie adaptation of Helen Gurley Brown's Sex and the Single Girl, as well as a television comedy script that eventually aired as part of McHale's Navy.

In 1967, Heller wrote a play called We Bombed in New Haven. He completed the play in only six weeks, but spent a great deal of time working with the producers as it was brought to the stage. It delivered an anti-war message while discussing the Vietnam War. It was originally produced by the Repertory Company of the Yale Drama School, with Stacy Keach in the starring role. After a slight revision, it was published by Alfred A. Knopf and then debuted on Broadway, starring Jason Robards.

Heller's follow-up novel, Something Happened, was finally published in 1974. Critics were enthusiastic about the book, and both its hardcover and paperback editions reached number one on the New York Times bestseller list. Heller wrote another five novels, each of which took him several years to complete. One of them, Closing Time, revisited many of the characters from Catch-22 as they adjusted to postwar New York. All of the novels sold respectably well, but could not duplicate the success of his first novel. In 1993, Heller told The Times "[w]hen I read something saying I've not done anything as good as Catch-22 I'm tempted to reply, 'Who has?'."

Heller's final novel, Portrait of an Artist, as an Old Man (a play on Portrait of the Artist, as a Young Man by James Joyce) is a metafictional and semi-autobiographical work that follows an aging artist who struggles to write one final great book to match the success of his earlier work. Through the novel, "Pota" experiments with various story ideas and genres, none of which seem to satisfy him. It is often interpreted as Heller's meditation on his own career, particularly the outsized shadow cast by his debut novel Catch-22. It was published posthumously.

=== Work process ===
Heller did not begin work on a story until he had envisioned both a first and last line. The first sentence usually appeared to him "independent of any conscious preparation." In most cases, the sentence did not inspire a second sentence. At times, he would be able to write several pages before giving up on that hook. Usually, within an hour or so of receiving his inspiration, Heller would have mapped out a basic plot and characters for the story. When he was ready to begin writing, he focused on one paragraph at a time, until he had three or four handwritten pages, which he then spent several hours reworking.

Heller maintained that he did not "have a philosophy of life, or a need to organize its progression. My books are not constructed to 'say anything.'" Only when he was almost one-third finished with the novel would he gain a clear vision of what it should be about. At that point, with the idea solidified, he would rewrite all that he had finished and then continue to the end of the story. The finished version of the novel would often not begin or end with the sentences he had originally envisioned, although he usually tried to include the original opening sentence somewhere in the text.

== Personal life ==
He was married to Shirley Held from 1945 to 1981 and they had two children, Erica (born 1952) and Theodore (born 1956).

In 1987 he married Valerie Humphries, formerly one of his nurses when he had Guillain–Barré syndrome.

== Later teaching career ==
After the publication of Catch-22, Heller resumed a part-time academic career as an adjunct professor of creative writing at Yale University and the University of Pennsylvania. In the 1970s, Heller taught creative writing as a distinguished professor at the City College of New York.

== Illness ==
On Sunday, December 13, 1981, Heller was diagnosed with Guillain–Barré syndrome, a debilitating syndrome that left him temporarily paralyzed. He was admitted to the Intensive Care Unit of Mount Sinai Medical Hospital the same day, and remained there, bedridden, until his condition had improved enough to permit his transfer to the Rusk Institute of Rehabilitation Medicine on January 26, 1982. His illness and recovery are recounted at great length in the autobiographical No Laughing Matter, which contains alternating chapters by Heller and his good friend Speed Vogel. The book describes the assistance and companionship Heller received during this period from a number of his prominent friends—Mel Brooks, Mario Puzo, Dustin Hoffman, and George Mandel among them.

== Later years ==
Heller returned to St. Catherine's as a visiting Fellow, for a term, in 1991 and was appointed an Honorary Fellow of the college. In 1998, he released a memoir, Now and Then: From Coney Island to Here, in which he relived his childhood as the son of a deliveryman and offered some details about the inspirations for Catch-22.

Heller was an agnostic.

He died of a heart attack at his home in East Hampton, on Long Island, in December 1999, shortly after the completion of his final novel, Portrait of an Artist, as an Old Man. On hearing of Heller's death, his friend Kurt Vonnegut said, "Oh, God, how terrible. This is a calamity for American literature."

== Works ==
=== Novels ===
- Catch-22 (1961)
- Something Happened (1974)
- Good as Gold (1979)
- God Knows (1984)
- Picture This (1988)
- Closing Time (1994)
- Portrait of an Artist, as an Old Man (2000, posthumous)

=== Short stories ===
- “Love, Dad” (1969)
- “Yossarian Survives” (1987)
- "The Day Bush Left" (1990)
- Catch as Catch Can: The Collected Stories and Other Writings (2003, posthumous)
- "Almost Like Christmas" (2013, posthumous)

=== Plays ===
- We Bombed in New Haven (1967)
- Catch-22 (1973)
- Clevinger's Trial (1973)

=== Screenplays ===
- Sex and the Single Girl (1964)
- Casino Royale (1967) (uncredited)
- Dirty Dingus Magee (1970)

=== Teleplay ===
- McHale's Navy, episode four, "PT 73, Where Are You?" (1962)

=== Autobiographies ===
- No Laughing Matter (1986)
- Now and Then (1998)
