= Something Happened =

1974 novel by Joseph Heller

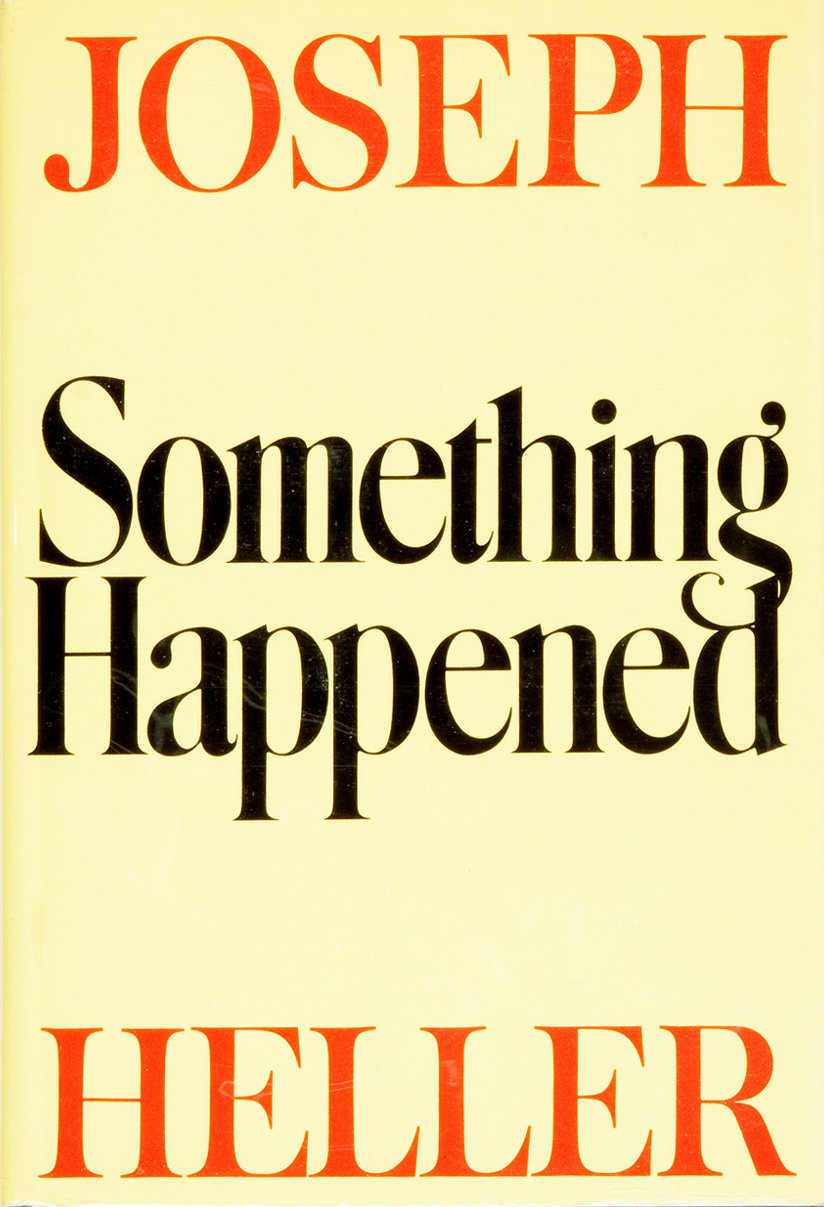
- First edition
- Author: Joseph Heller
- Cover artist: Paul Bacon
- Language: English
- Publisher: Alfred A. Knopf
- Publication date: September 1974
- Publication place: United States
- Media type: Print (Hardback & Paperback)
- ISBN: 0-394-46568-7
- OCLC: 902893
- Dewey Decimal: 813/.5/4
- LC Class: PZ4.H47665 So PS3558.E476

Something Happened is Joseph Heller's second novel (published in 1974, thirteen years after Catch-22). Its main character and narrator is Bob Slocum, a businessman who engages in a stream of consciousness narrative about his job, his family, his childhood, his sexual escapades, and his own psyche. Although Something Happened failed to achieve the level of renown that Catch-22 did, it has since developed a cult following, with some considering it one of Heller's finest works.

== Plot ==
Something Happened is narrated by Bob Slocum, a mid-level corporate executive working in a large American company unnamed in the book but later revealed in a 1974 Kurt Vonnegut book review to be known simply as "Time, Incorporated". The novel is structured as an extended, first-person interior monologue, and not very traditional in form. While there is a throughline concerning Slocum’s anticipation of a potential promotion, the bulk of the narrative is composed of disjointed reflections on various aspects of his life, ranging from early childhood memories to observations about his workplace, family, and psychological state.

The narrative unfolds in a non-linear fashion, with Slocum recounting anecdotes and impressions from different periods of his life without a consistent chronology or clear connection between them. Much of the text consists of his internal commentary on the banality and to a lesser extent cruelty of corporate life, which he portrays as emotionally barren and politically treacherous. He reflects obsessively on his colleagues and superiors, often with suspicion, resentment, or fear, and exhibits a constant low-grade anxiety about his professional standing. Although pretty successful, he remains deeply insecure, uncertain of how he is perceived, and distrustful of nearly everyone around him. He repeats through the novel his fear of asphyxiation.

Personally, Slocum is emotionally disconnected from his wife and has a doting, but ambiguous relationship with his three children. He describes his wife as still quite attractive, but a regular drinker. His daughter and he bicker often, and he doesn't believe his wife when she tells him that she wants to talk to him. He identifies closely with his fearful middle son, and hates his youngest son, who has an intellectual disability. He uses prostitutes often. He revisits episodes from his childhood and adolescence, portraying a strained relationship with his family.

As the narrative advances, Slocum’s grasp on reality begins to deteriorate. He increasingly questions the accuracy of his own memories and perceptions, sometimes recalling events incorrectly or realizing that he may have imagined them entirely. He experiences hallucinations and episodes of disorientation, leading him to worry about the state of his mental health. These elements introduce the possibility that some or all of the events recounted in the novel may be unreliable, positioning Slocum as a deeply untrustworthy narrator.

The novel concludes with his son being hit by a car and Bob Slocum, in panic, hugging him to his death. Later, it is revealed that the son only had minor, unimportant wounds, and Slocum squeezing the boy so tightly caused him to die of asphyxiation. This is the Something that happened. On the last few pages, Slocum is described as a decisive and commanding executive at his new job, while all self-reflection disappears entirely.

== Themes ==
Heller's Something Happened shows the dehumanizing effects of the corporate world on employees due to the pressures of success. Bob Slocum slowly falls into a state of madness and the inability to feel genuine connections with people around him. This stems from the pressures put on employees to have financial success and not focus on their own well-being “what we do see is Slocum’s dissipation of energy, the internality of a psychological gestalt generated by fear, and the subtle logic of psychological domination” (Glass). Heller captures the other side of the corporate lifestyle and critiques the problem America faces in this unfair system. Direct effects of this that we see through Bob Slocum is in his relationships with co-workers, as he believes they are solely a component of the system built on power and control. Slocum is also affected outside of work, as his relationship with his wife and children diminishes due to the psychological toll that his job puts upon him.

== Reception ==
Something Happened has frequently been criticized as overlong, rambling, and deeply unhappy. These sentiments are echoed in a review of the novel by fellow writer and humorist Kurt Vonnegut, but are countered with praise for the novel's prose and the meticulous patience Heller took in the creation of the novel, stating, "Is this book any good? Yes. It is splendidly put together and hypnotic to read. It is as clear and hard-edged as a cut diamond. Mr. Heller's concentration and patience are so evident on every page that one can only say that 'Something Happened' is at all points precisely what he hoped it would be." In a contemporary write-up for Kirkus Reviews, the reviewer stated that "there is none of the rogue absurdism or imaginative verve" of Heller's previous novel, but praised the book's "bravura, expertise and cumulative hook".

Something Happened has since garnered a small base of devoted fans. In 2015, Carmen Petaccio referred to it as the "most criminally overlooked great novel of the past half century [...] one of the most pleasurable, engrossing, and in retrospect moving American novels ever written." Naturi Thomas-Millard called it the "best book you've never read"; while agreeing that it is overlong, she billed it as "an invaluable study in how to portray the horror of everyday life." Novelist Jonathan Franzen prefers Something Happened to Catch-22, and Christopher Buckley referred to the work as "dark and brilliant". Comedian Richard Lewis claims he "happily lost most of [his] hope" after reading the novel.
