= God Knows (novel) =

1984 tragicomedic novel written by Joseph Heller

- First edition cover (Knopf)
- Author: Joseph Heller
- Publisher: Alfred A. Knopf
- Publication date: October 8, 1984
- Pages: 373
- ISBN: 0-684-84125-8

God Knows is a 1984 tragicomedy novel written by American writer Joseph Heller; it is his fourth novel.

== Plot ==
It is narrated by the Biblical King David of Israel, and purports to be his deathbed memoirs; however, this David does not recount his life in a straightforward fashion, and the storyline is often fractured. Indeed, it is possible to read the book as Heller's meditation upon his own mortality, and an exploration of the Jewish view of family, life, death, etc.

All of the major touchstones of King David's life are in place: his childhood herding sheep, the prophet Samuel, Goliath, King Saul, Jonathan (and homosexual innuendoes), Bathsheba and Uriah, the Psalms, the treachery of Absalom, Solomon, etc.

At some points, David betrays knowledge of the future (he mentions Michelangelo's David, saying it is ironic that a King of the Jews should stand there uncircumcised), and even of heaven (Moses sits on a rock in the afterworld, working on his stutter) – we are left to guess whether or not this stems from his special relationship with God, as no answers are forthcoming.

== Reception ==
The book was a commercial success: The Times of London reported in late 1985 that it had remained high in the bestseller lists since publication the previous year.

Favorable reviews quoted in the paperback edition (published by Black Swan in 1985) declared that 'Mr Heller is dancing at the top of his form again… original, sad, wildly funny and filled with roaring' (Mordecai Richler, New York Times Book Review) and that ‘the book is worth the price of admission for the first few pages alone’ (Martin Amis, The Observer).

On the other hand Kirkus assessed Heller's character/history/theology inventions and deemed them "undeveloped, with the Borscht Belt rhythms too relentless to allow for depth or nuance. And the entire vaudeville enterprise eventually seems wilted, formula-creased." However, the magazine praised the author's efforts of paying attention to the scriptures calling them "remarkable."
