= Bombardier (aircrew) =

Bomb targeter on military planes

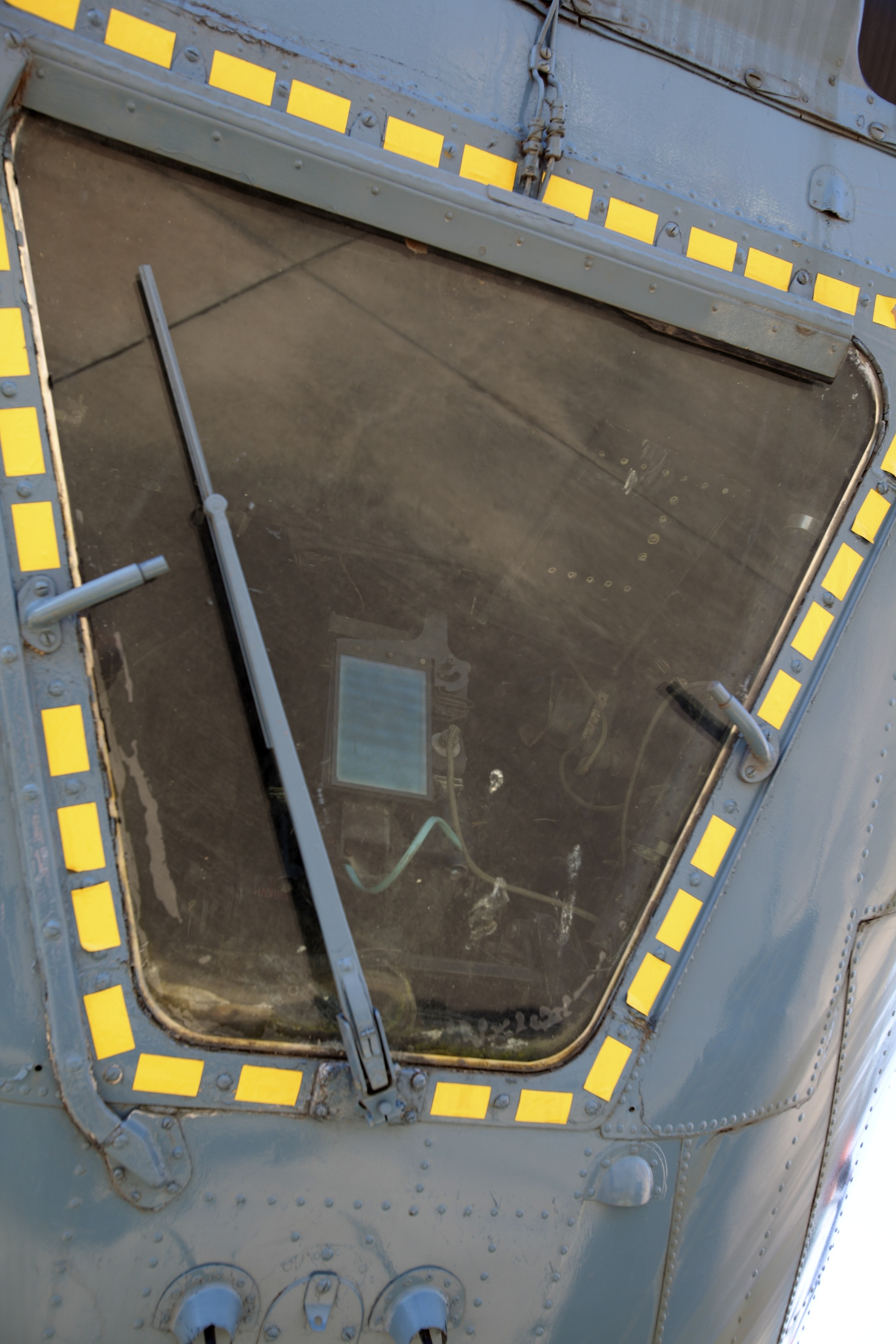
The bomb-aimer's window on a South African Air Force Avro Shackleton maritime patrol / bomber aircraft

A bombardier or bomb aimer is the crew member of a bomber aircraft responsible for the targeting of aerial bombs. "Bomb aimer" was the preferred term in the military forces of the Commonwealth, while "bombardier" (from the French word for "bomb thrower" and similar in meaning to "grenadier") was the equivalent position in the United States Armed Forces.

In many planes, the bombardier took control of the airplane during the bombing run, using a device such as the Norden bombsight which was connected to the autopilot of the plane. Often stationed in the extreme front of the aircraft, on the way to the target and after releasing the bombs, he could also serve as the front gunner in aircraft that had a front turret.

In the latter part of the 20th century, the title of bombardier fell into disuse, due largely to changes in technology, emanating from the replacement of this manual function with the development of computerized technology and smart bombs, that has given rise to terms like weapon systems officer or combat systems officer to describe the modern role. The equivalent in the US Navy and US Marine Corps is the naval flight officer.

In the United States, the position of bombardier was originally held by a sergeant, but they were commissioned as officers in 1941. In the Commonwealth, a bomb aimer could be an officer or (more frequently) a senior non-commissioned officer (sergeant or flight sergeant) or warrant officer; like wireless operators, air engineers and air gunners, all officer bomb aimers were commissioned from the ranks after non-commissioned aircrew service, unlike pilots and navigators who could also join directly as commissioned officers.

During World War II, US Army Air Forces bombardiers were recognized with the award of the Bombardier Badge. They were selected during training for their sense of timing and manual dexterity. With the establishment of an independent US Air Force in 1947, USAF bombardiers were awarded the wings known as the Navigator badge, now known as the Combat Systems Officer badge. Commonwealth bomb aimers wore a single-wing aircrew brevet with the letter "B".

The aircraft of the United Kingdom's V bomber force carried two navigators, one of whom acted as bomb aimer, although having the official title of "navigator radar".
