= Catch-22 =

1961 novel by Joseph Heller

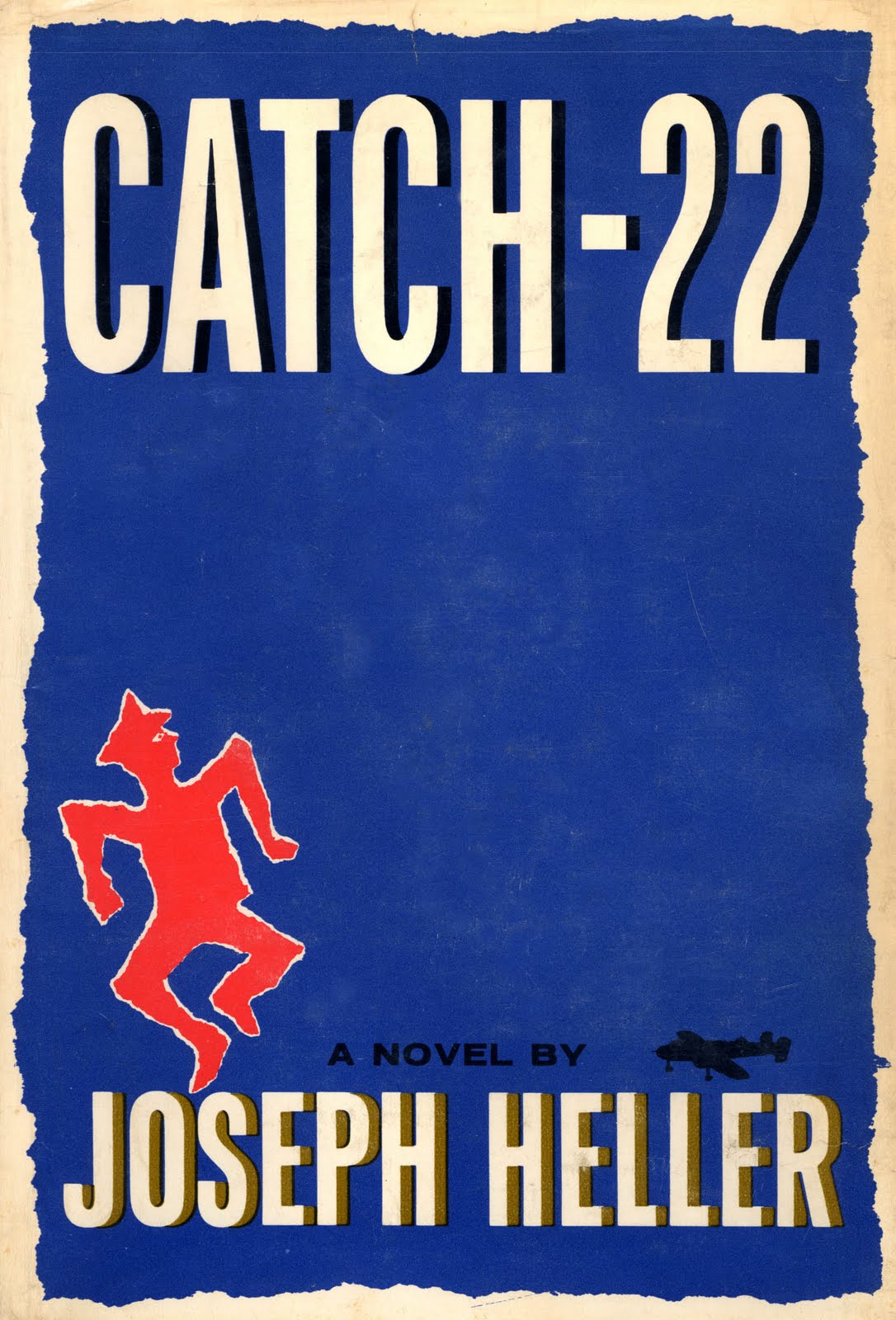
- First edition cover
- Author: Joseph Heller
- Cover artist: Paul Bacon
- Language: English
- Genre: Dark comedy, absurdist fiction, satire, war fiction, historical fiction
- Publisher: Simon & Schuster
- Publication date: October 10, 1961
- Publication place: United States
- Media type: Print (hardback)
- Pages: 453 (1st edition hardback)
- ISBN: 0-671-12805-1
- OCLC: 35231812
- Dewey Decimal: 813/.54 22
- LC Class: PS3558.E476 C3 2004
- Followed by: Closing Time (1994)

Catch-22 is a satirical war novel by American author Joseph Heller. It is his debut novel. He began writing it in 1953, and the book was first published in 1961. Often cited as one of the most significant novels of the 20th century, it uses a distinctive non-chronological third-person omniscient narration, describing events from the points of view of different characters. The separate storylines are out of sequence so the timeline develops along with the plot. The novel satirizes military bureaucracy and greed.

The novel is set during World War II, from 1942 to 1944. It mainly follows the life of antihero Captain John Yossarian, a U.S. Army Air Forces B-25 bombardier of Assyrian heritage. Most of the events in the book occur while the fictional 256th US Army Air Squadron is based on the island of Pianosa, in the Mediterranean Sea west of the Italian mainland, although it also includes episodes from basic training at Lowry Field in Colorado and Air Corps training at Santa Ana Army Air Base in California. The novel examines the absurdity of war and military life through the experiences of Yossarian and his cohorts, who attempt to maintain their sanity while fulfilling their service requirements so that they may return home.

The book was made into a film adaptation in 1970, directed by Mike Nichols, and a miniseries in 2019, produced by George Clooney. In 1994, Heller published a sequel to the novel titled Closing Time.

== Synopsis ==
The main character, USAAF Captain John Yossarian, is introduced in the setting of a military hospital where he has retreated under the guise of a chronic liver condition to avoid flying further combat missions. He has grown disillusioned with the war effort and distrustful of his commanding officers. Throughout the novel, the commanding officers show extreme disregard for the lives of their troops and are all too willing to sacrifice their men to further their own ends. In particular, Yossarian's commander, Colonel Cathcart, volunteers his unit to fly dangerous missions and forces his men to fly more combat missions than any other unit, constantly raising the number of missions necessary to complete a tour of duty so that the men can never return home, because he wishes to be seen as brave by his superiors even though he has only ever flown one combat mission. After flying forty-four combat missions, Yossarian is traumatized by aerial combat and witnessing the deaths of his friends; he is terrified of being killed in action during each mission, but still succeeds in flying twenty-seven more missions over the course of the novel, totaling seventy-one by the end. As the novel progresses, Yossarian's moral character and courage emerge more clearly, in contrast to his seeming selfishness and cowardice when first introduced. He is shown to be an honest, loyal, and able flyer who has been pushed to desperation by the selfishness and cowardice of the authorities responsible for him, especially doctors and military leaders.

The development of the novel can be split into sections:

- The first (chapters 1–11) broadly follows the story fragmented between characters, but in a single chronological time in 1944.
- The second (chapters 12–20) flashes back to focus primarily on the "Great Big Siege of Bologna" before once again jumping to the third part.
- The third (chapter 21–25) is the chronological present of 1944.
- The fourth (chapters 26–28) flashes back to the origins and growth of Milo's syndicate.
- The fifth part (chapters 28–32) returns again to the narrative present and maintains the tone of the previous four.
- The sixth and final part (chapter 32 and on) remains in the story's present, but takes a much darker turn and emphasizes the darkness and brutality of war and life in general.

For most of the book, the reader is cushioned from directly experiencing the full horror of war, but it is implied by the extreme trauma and fear that afflicts the airmen. In the final section, these events are laid bare. The horror begins with a pointless attack on an undefended Italian mountain village, with the succeeding chapters incorporating depictions of despair (Doc Daneeka and the chaplain), disappearance in combat (Orr and Clevinger), disappearance caused by the army (Dunbar) and death of most of Yossarian's friends (Nately, McWatt, Kid Sampson, Dobbs, Chief White Halfoat and Hungry Joe), culminating in the horrors of Chapter 39, in particular Aarfy's rape and murder of the innocent young woman Michaela. In Chapter 41 the full details of the death of Snowden are finally revealed.

Nevertheless, the novel ends on an upbeat note with Yossarian learning of Orr's miraculous escape to Sweden via rowing after purposefully crashing his plane and Yossarian's pledge to follow him there.

== Style ==
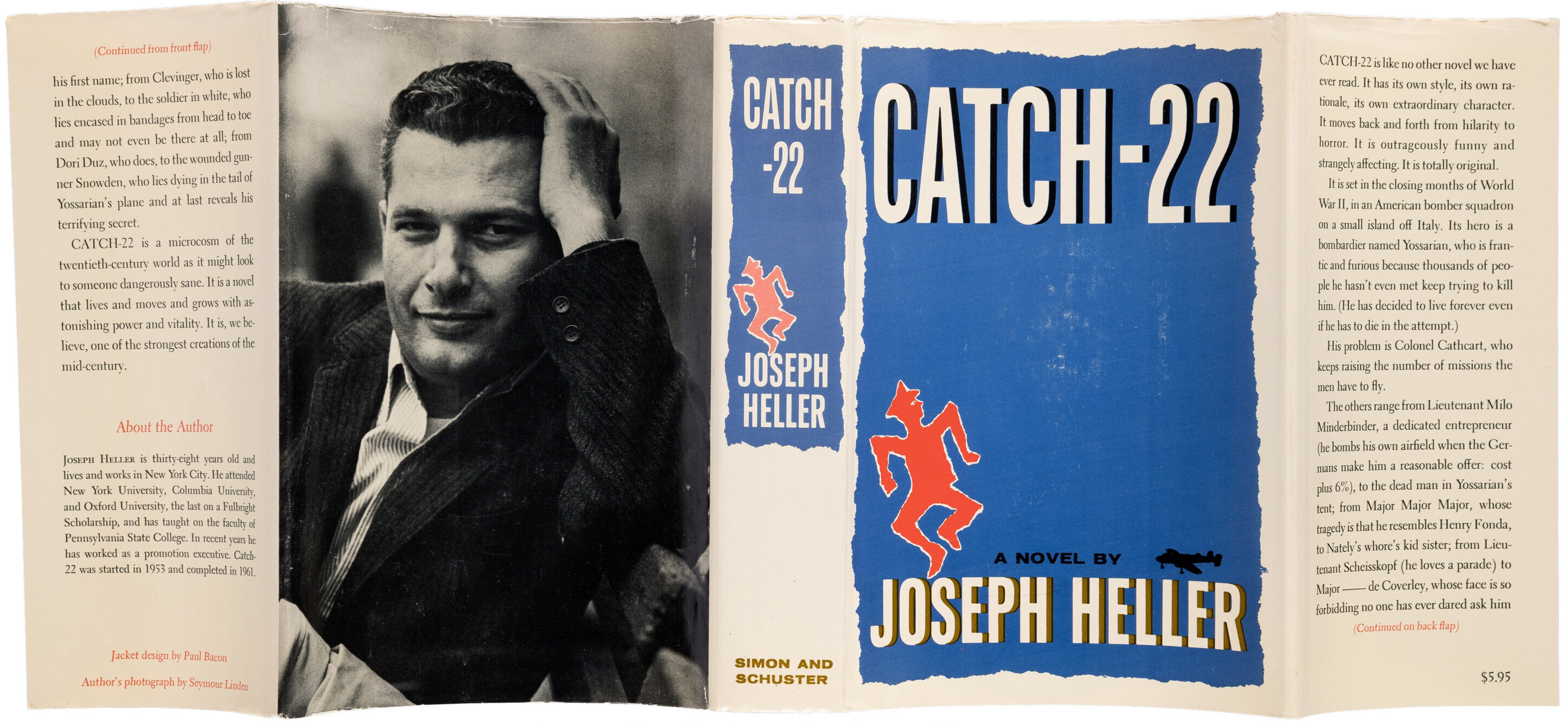
Catch-22 dust jacket, first edition (1961)

Many events in the book are repeatedly described from differing points of view, so the reader learns more about each event from each iteration, with the new information often completing a joke, the setup of which was told several chapters previously. The narrative's events are out of sequence, but events are referred to as if the reader is already familiar with them so that the reader must ultimately piece together a timeline of events. Specific words, phrases, and questions are also repeated frequently, generally to comic effect.

Much of Heller's prose in Catch-22 is circular and repetitive, exemplifying in its form the structure of a Catch-22. Circular reasoning is widely used by some characters to justify their actions and opinions. Heller revels in paradox. For example: "The Texan turned out to be good-natured, generous and likable. In three days no one could stand him," and "The case against Clevinger was open and shut. The only thing missing was something to charge him with." This atmosphere of apparently logical irrationality pervades the book. This style is also recognizable regarding how exactly Clevinger's trial would be executed by Lieutenant Scheisskopf: "As a member of the Action Board, Lieutenant Scheisskopf was one of the judges who would weigh the merits of the case against Clevinger as presented by the prosecutor. Lieutenant Scheisskopf was also the prosecutor. Clevinger had an officer defending him. The officer defending him was Lieutenant Scheisskopf."

While a few characters are most prominent, especially Yossarian and the Chaplain, the majority of named characters are described in detail with fleshed out or multidimensional personas to the extent that there are few if any "minor characters". There are no traditional heroes in the novel, reflecting the underlying commentary that war has no heroes, only victims.

Although its nonchronological structure may at first seem random, Catch-22 is highly structured. It is founded on a structure of free association; ideas run into one another through seemingly random connections. For example, Chapter 1, titled "The Texan", ends with "everybody but the CID man, who had caught a cold from the fighter captain and come down with pneumonia." Chapter 2, titled "Clevinger", begins with "In a way, the CID man was pretty lucky because outside the hospital the war was still going on." The CID man connects the two chapters like a free association bridge and eventually Chapter 2 flows from the CID man to Clevinger through more free association links.

As Heller utilizes an episodic structure for most of the novel, many chapters may appear to be a disjointed series of events with little or no connection with each other. However, individual chapters often deal with thematically unique ideas, such as Chapter 11 (“Captain Black”) which parodies Red Scare-era McCarthyism, and Chapter 18 (“The Soldier Who Saw Everything Twice”) which explores theological concepts of mortality.

== Themes ==
=== Paradox ===
Yossarian comes to fear his commanding officers more than he fears the Germans attempting to shoot him down and he feels that "they" are "out to get him." The reason Yossarian fears his commanders more than the enemy is that as he flies more missions, Colonel Cathcart increases the number of required combat missions before a soldier may return home; he reaches the magic number only to have it retroactively raised. He comes to despair of ever getting home and is greatly relieved when he is sent to the hospital for a condition that is almost jaundice. In Yossarian's words:

The enemy is anybody who's going to get you killed, no matter which side he's on, and that includes Colonel Cathcart. And don't you forget that, because the longer you remember it, the longer you might live.

=== Tragedy and farce ===
Much of the farce in the novel is fueled by intentional and unintentional miscommunication, occasionally leading to tragic consequences. For example, Cathcart's desire to become a general is thwarted by ex-P.F.C. Wintergreen sabotaging his correspondence. Major Major's and Yossarian's mis-censoring of correspondence is blamed on the Chaplain, who is threatened with imprisonment as a result.

=== Theodicy ===
Yossarian questions the idea that God is all-powerful, all-good, and all knowing. The narrator seems to believe that God, if not evil, is incompetent. In chapter 18, Yossarian states that he "believes in the God he doesn't believe in", this version of God having created Hitler, the war, and all the failures of human life and society, as exemplified in the following passage:

"And don't tell me God works in mysterious ways", Yossarian continued, hurtling over her objections. "There's nothing so mysterious about it. He's not working at all. He's playing or else He's forgotten all about us. That's the kind of God you people talk about – a country bumpkin, a clumsy, bungling, brainless, conceited, uncouth hayseed. Good God, how much reverence can you have for a Supreme Being who finds it necessary to include such phenomena as phlegm and tooth decay in His divine system of creation? What in the world was running through that warped, evil, scatological mind of His when He robbed old people of the power to control their bowel movements? Why in the world did he ever create pain? ... Oh, He was really being charitable to us when He gave us pain! Why couldn't He have used a doorbell instead to notify us, or one of His celestial choirs? Or a system of blue-and-red neon tubes right in the middle of each person's forehead. Any jukebox manufacturer worth his salt could have done that. Why couldn't He? ... What a colossal, immortal blunderer! When you consider the opportunity and power He had to really do a job, and then look at the stupid, ugly little mess He made of it instead, His sheer incompetence is almost staggering. ..."

Later Heller writes of Yossarian wandering through a war-torn Italian city (Chapter 39):

"Yossarian quickened his pace to get away, almost ran. The night was filled with horrors, and he thought he knew how Christ must have felt as he walked through the world, like a psychiatrist through a ward full of nuts, like a victim through a prison full of thieves. What a welcome sight a leper must have been. At the next corner a man was beating a small boy brutally in the midst of an immobile crowd of adult spectators who made no effort to intervene ..."

=== Military–industrial complex ===
While the military's enemies are Germans, none appear in the story as enemy combatants. This ironic situation is epitomized in one of the few appearances of German personnel in the novel, who act as pilots employed by the squadron's mess officer, Milo Minderbinder, to bomb the American encampment on Pianosa. This predicament indicates a tension between traditional motives for violence and those of the modern economic machine, which seems to generate violence simply as another means to profit, quite independent of geographical or ideological constraints, thus creating a military–industrial complex. Heller emphasizes the danger of profit-seeking by portraying Milo without "evil intent". Milo's actions are portrayed as the result of greed, not malice.

== Characters ==
The novel has over 50 named characters, many of whom have titular chapters dedicated to expanding on their personalities or motivations.

== Influences ==
Heller wanted to be a writer from an early age. His experiences as a bombardier during World War II inspired Catch-22; Heller later said that he "never had a bad officer". In a 1977 essay on Catch-22, Heller stated that the "antiwar and antigovernment feelings in the book" were a product of the Korean War and the 1950s rather than World War II itself. Heller's criticisms are not intended for World War II but for the Cold War and McCarthyism.

The influence of the 1950s on Catch-22 is evident through Heller's extensive use of anachronism. Though the novel is ostensibly set in World War II, Heller intentionally included anachronisms like loyalty oaths and computers (IBM machines) to situate the novel in the context of the 1950s. Many of the characters are based on or connected to individuals from the 1950s:

- Milo Minderbinder's maxim "What's good for M&M Enterprises is good for the country" alludes to the former president of General Motors Charles Erwin Wilson's 1953 statement before the Senate: "What's good for General Motors is good for the country."
- The question of "Who promoted Major Major?" alludes to Joseph McCarthy's questioning of the promotion of Major Peress, an army dentist who refused to sign loyalty oaths.

Czech writer Arnošt Lustig recounts in his book 3x18 that Joseph Heller told him that he would never have written Catch-22 had he not first read The Good Soldier Švejk by Jaroslav Hašek.

In 1998, some critics raised the possibility that Heller's book had questionable similarities to Louis Falstein's 1950 novel, Face of a Hero. Falstein never raised the issue between Catch-22's publication and his death in 1995 and Heller claimed never to have been aware of Falstein's novel. Heller said that the novel had been influenced by Céline, Waugh and Nabokov. Many of the similarities have been stated to be attributable to the authors' experiences, both having served as U.S. Army Air Forces aircrew in Italy in World War II. However, their themes and styles are different.

== Concept ==
A "Catch-22" is "a problem for which the only solution is denied by a circumstance inherent in the problem or by a rule". For example, losing something is typically a conventional problem; to solve it, one looks for the lost item until one finds it. But if the thing lost is one's glasses, one cannot see to look for them – a Catch-22. The term "Catch-22" is also used more broadly to mean a tricky problem or a no-win or absurd situation.

In the book, Catch-22 is a military rule typifying bureaucratic operation and reasoning. The rule is not stated in a precise form, but the principal example in the book fits the definition above: If one is crazy, one does not have to fly missions; and one must be crazy to fly. However, whereas one has to apply to be excused, the very plea for discharge is itself an evidence of a sound mind, therefore halting the possibility of being excused on the grounds of insanity. Either for not applying to be excused, or for applying and being (inevitably) refused, one will always be obliged to the war. The narrator explains:

There was only one catch and that was Catch-22, which specified that a concern for one's safety in the face of dangers that were real and immediate was the process of a rational mind. Orr was crazy and could be grounded. All he had to do was ask; and as soon as he did, he would no longer be crazy and would have to fly more missions. Orr would be crazy to fly more missions and sane if he didn't, but if he were sane he had to fly them. If he flew them he was crazy and didn't have to, but if he didn't want to he was sane and had to. Yossarian was moved very deeply by the absolute simplicity of this clause of Catch-22 and let out a respectful whistle. (p. 56, ch. 5)

Other forms of Catch-22 are invoked throughout the novel to justify various bureaucratic actions. At one point, victims of harassment by military police quote the MPs' explanation of one of Catch-22's provisions: "Catch-22 states that agents enforcing Catch-22 need not prove that Catch-22 actually contains whatever provision the accused violator is accused of violating." Another character explains: "Catch-22 says they have a right to do anything we can't stop them from doing."

Yossarian comes to realize that Catch-22 does not actually exist, but because the powers that be claim it does, and the world believes it does, it nevertheless has potent effects. Indeed, because it does not exist, there is no way it can be repealed, undone, overthrown, or denounced. The combination of force with specious and spurious legalistic justification is one of the book's primary motifs.

The motif of bureaucratic absurdity is further explored in 1994's Closing Time, Heller's sequel to Catch-22. This darker, slower-paced, apocalyptic novel explores the pre- and post-war lives of some of the major characters in Catch-22, with particular emphasis on the relationship between Yossarian and tail gunner Sammy Singer.

== Literary allusions ==
Catch-22 contains allusions to many works of literature. Howard Jacobson, in his 2004 introduction to the Vintage Classics publication, wrote that the novel was "positioned teasingly ... between literature and literature's opposites – between Shakespeare and Rabelais and Dickens and Dostoevsky and Gogol and Céline and the Absurdists and of course Kafka on the one hand, and on the other vaudeville and slapstick and Bilko and Abbott and Costello and Tom and Jerry and the Goons (if Heller had ever heard of the Goons)." One critic argues that it is Kafka's influence that can be seen most strongly in the novel: "Like Kafka's heroes, Yossarian is riddled with anxiety and caught in an inexorable nightmare – in his case created by Colonel Cathcart and the inevitability of his raising the number of missions he has to fly."

== Historical context ==
The idea for Catch-22 was based on Joseph Heller's personal experience in World War II. The feelings that Yossarian and the other bomber crew felt were taken directly from problems he suffered while on duty. Heller flew 60 bombing missions from May to October in 1944. Heller was able to make it out of the war, but it took until 1953 before he could start writing about it. For this reason, the book contains references to post-World War II phenomena like IBM computers and loyalty oaths. The war experience turned Heller into a "tortured, funny, deeply peculiar human being".

After publication in 1961, Catch-22 became very popular among teenagers at the time. Catch-22 seemed to embody the feelings that young people had toward the Vietnam War. A common joke was that every student who went off to college at the time took along a copy of Catch-22. The popularity of the book created a cult following, which led to more than eight million copies being sold in the United States. On October 26, 1986, professor and author John W. Aldridge wrote a piece in The New York Times celebrating the 25th anniversary of the publishing of Catch-22. He commented that Heller's book presaged the chaos in the world that was to come:

The comic fable that ends in horror has become more and more clearly a reflection of the altogether uncomic and horrifying realities of the world in which we live and hope to survive.

== Title ==
The title refers to a fictional bureaucratic stipulation that embodies illogical and immoral reasoning. The idea being that if one pleads insanity to stop flying missions with a high mortality rate, one is in fact sane; however, one must be insane to keep flying those exact missions. The opening chapter of the novel was first published, in 1955, by New World Writing as Catch-18, but Heller's agent, Candida Donadio, asked him to change the title, to avert its confusion with Leon Uris's recently published Mila 18. The implications in Judaism of the number 18 – which refers to chai, meaning "alive", in Gematria – were relevant to Heller's somewhat greater emphasis on Jewish themes in early drafts of his novel. Heller's daughter Erica wrote that the Simon & Schuster editor, Robert Gottlieb, was the person who came up with the number 22, and Gottlieb himself stated that he did in the documentary Turn Every Page: The Adventures of Robert Caro and Robert Gottlieb.

Parallels among a number of character exchanges in the novel suggested the doubled-one title of Catch-11, but the 1960 release of Ocean's Eleven eliminated that. Catch-17 was rejected so as not to be confused with the World War II film Stalag 17, as was Catch-14, apparently because the publisher did not believe that 14 was a "funny number". Eventually, the title came to be Catch-22, which, like 11, has a duplicated digit, with the 2 also referring to a number of déjà vu-like events common in the novel.

== Publication and movie rights ==
Catch-22 was sold to Simon & Schuster, where it had been championed by editor Robert Gottlieb, who, along with Nina Bourne, edited and oversaw the marketing of the book. Gottlieb was a strong advocate for the book along with Peter Schwed and Justin Kaplan. Henry Simon, a vice president at Simon & Schuster, found it repetitive and offensive. The editorial board decided to contract the book when Heller agreed to revisions; he signed for US$1,500 in 1961 (equivalent to about $16,200 in 2025).

Officially published on October 10, 1961, the hardcover sold for $5.95. The book was not a best-seller in hardcover in the United States. Though twelve thousand copies were sold by Thanksgiving, it never entered The New York Times Best Seller list. It received good notices and was nominated for the National Book Award in March 1962, though Walker Percy's The Moviegoer won. Catch-22 went through four printings in hardcover but sold well on only the East Coast. The book never established itself nationally until it was published in paperback for 75 cents.

Upon publication in Great Britain, the book became the No. 1 best-seller. Don Fine of Dell Paperbacks bought the paperback reprint rights to Catch-22 for $32,000. Between the paperback's release in September 1962 and April 1963, it sold 1.1 million copies.

In August 1962, Donadio brokered the sale of movie rights to Columbia Pictures for $100,000 plus $25,000 to write a treatment or a first draft of a screenplay.

== Reception ==
The initial reviews of the book ranged from very positive to very negative. There were positive reviews from The Nation ("the best novel to come out in years"), the New York Herald Tribune ("A wild, moving, shocking, hilarious, raging, exhilarating, giant roller-coaster of a book") and The New York Times ("A dazzling performance that will outrage nearly as many readers as it delights"). On the other hand, The New Yorker disliked it ("doesn't even seem to be written; instead, it gives the impression of having been shouted onto paper", "what remains is a debris of sour jokes"), and a second review from the New York Times also disliked it ("repetitive and monotonous. Or one can say that it is too short because none of its many interesting characters and actions is given enough play to become a controlling interest"). One commentator of Catch-22 recognized that "many early audiences liked the book for just the same reasons that caused others to hate it". The book eventually gained a cult following, especially among teenagers and college students. Heller later remarked that in 1962, after appearing on the Today show he went out drinking with the host at the time, John Chancellor, who handed him stickers that Chancellor had got privately printed reading "YOSSARIAN LIVES". Heller also said that Chancellor had been secretly putting them on the walls of the corridors and executive bathrooms in the NBC building.

Although the novel won no awards upon release, it has remained in print and is seen as one of the most significant American novels of the 20th century. Scholar and fellow World War II veteran Hugh Nibley said it was the most accurate book he ever read about the military. As of 2016 over ten million copies have been sold.

Although he continued writing, including a sequel novel Closing Time, Heller's later works were inevitably overshadowed by the success of Catch-22. When asked by critics why he had never managed to write another novel as good as his first, Heller would retort with a smile, "Who has?"

=== Challenges ===
Catch-22 has landed on the list of the American Library Association's banned and challenged classics.

In 1972, the Strongsville City School District school board removed Catch-22, as well as two books by Kurt Vonnegut, from school libraries and the curriculum. Five families sued the school board. The Sixth Circuit Court of Appeals rejected the claim, stating that school boards had the right to control the curriculum. The decision was overturned on appeal in 1976 in Minarcini v. Strongsville City School District. The court wrote, "A library is a storehouse of knowledge. Here we are concerned with the right of students to receive information which they and their teachers desire them to have." In 1982, the U.S. Supreme Court employed a similar rationale in its decision in Island Trees School District v. Pico on the removal of library books.

Because the book refers to some women as "whores", it was challenged at the Dallas, Texas, Independent School District (1974) and Snoqualmie, Washington (1979).

== Rankings ==
External videos
- "50th Anniversary of Joseph Heller's Catch-22" – Lesley Stahl moderating a panel made up of Christopher Buckley, Robert Gottlieb, Mike Nichols, and Scott Shepherd, October 18, 2011, C-SPAN

- The Modern Library ranked Catch-22 as the 7th (by review panel) and 12th (by public) greatest English-language novel of the 20th century.
- The Radcliffe Publishing Course ranked Catch-22 as number 15 of the 20th century's top 100 novels.
- The Observer listed Catch-22 as one of the 100 greatest novels of all time.
- Time puts Catch-22 in the top 100 English-language modern novels (1923 onwards, unranked).
- The Big Read by the BBC ranked Catch-22 as number 11 on a web poll of the UK's best-loved book.

== Adaptations ==
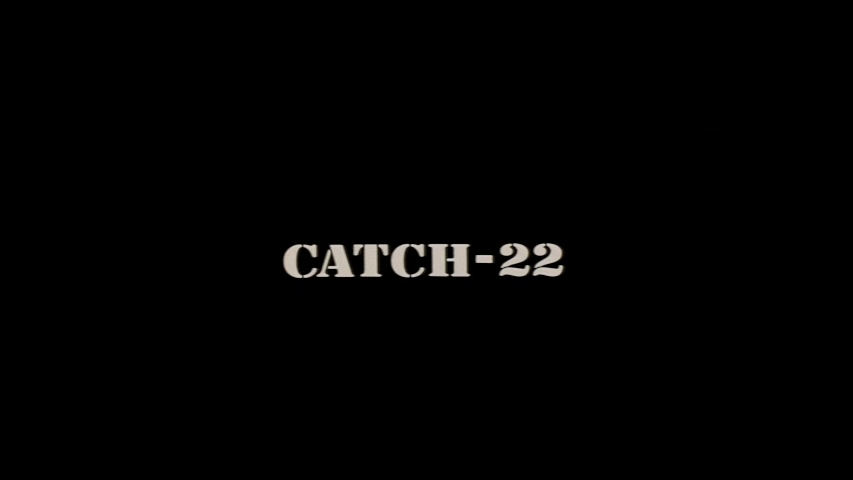
Opening title of the film adaptation

- Catch-22 was adapted into a feature film of the same name in 1970, directed by Mike Nichols. Alan Arkin portrayed Capt. Yossarian, with an ensemble cast including Art Garfunkel as Nately, Jon Voight as Milo Minderbinder, Orson Welles as General Dreedle, and Martin Balsam as Colonel Cathcart, amongst many others.
- A pilot for a comedy series based upon Catch-22 was made and televised in 1973, with Richard Dreyfuss in the starring role of Yossarian.
- Catch-22 play: Aquila Theatre produced a stage adaptation of Catch-22, based on Heller's 1971 stage adaptation. It was directed by Peter Meineck. This production toured the United States in 2007/8 with a Bexhill on Sea production in the fall of 2008.
- A six-episode miniseries produced by, and co-starring, George Clooney was picked up by Hulu for a straight-to-series order. It streamed on May 17, 2019. It was also broadcast by Channel 4 in the United Kingdom. Christopher Abbott portrayed Yossarian, with Kyle Chandler as Cathcart, Hugh Laurie as Major —— de Coverley, and Clooney as Major Scheisskopf.

== Selected releases ==
This list covers the first and most recent printed publications by the original publisher Simon & Schuster as well as all other formats. Other print publishers include Dell, Corgi, Vintage, Black Swan, Éditions Grasset, and Wahlström & Widstrand.

The original manuscript is held by Brandeis University.

- Heller, Joseph (June 1961) [1961]. Catch-22 (hardback). New York: Simon & Schuster. ISBN 0-684-83339-5. OCLC 35231812.
- Heller, Joseph (1961). Catch-22 (advance paperback with signed bookplate). Simon & Schuster. ISBN 0-440-51120-8.
- Heller, Joseph (1978). Catch-22 (signed limited edition leatherbound). Franklin Library. ISBN 0-8124-1717-8.
- Heller, Joseph (September 1996). Catch-22 (paperback). Simon & Schuster. ISBN 0-684-83339-5.
- Heller, Joseph (October 1999). Catch-22 (hardback). Simon & Schuster. ISBN 0-684-86513-0.
- Heller, Joseph (1980). Catch-22 (unabridged audio cassette). reader Wolfram Kandinsky. Books On Tape. ISBN 0-7366-8962-1.
- Heller, Joseph (1984). Catch-22 (audio cassette). Caedmon Audio. ISBN 0-694-50253-7.
- Heller, Joseph (1990). Catch-22 (unabridged audio CD). reader Jim Weiss. Books On Tape. ISBN 0-7366-9085-9.
- Heller, Joseph (1994). Catch-22 (abridged edition audio cassette). reader Alan Arkin. DH Audio. ISBN 0-88646-125-1.
- Heller, Joseph (2007). Catch-22 (unabridged audio CD). reader Jay O. Sanders. Caedmon. ISBN 978-0-06-126246-3.
- Heller, Joseph (2008). Catch-22 (unabridged audio CD). reader Trevor White. Hachette Audio. ISBN 978-1-4055-0387-7.

== See also ==
- Antinomy
- Morton's fork
