= Van Zorn =

1914 comedy play by Edwin Arlington Robinson

Van Zorn is a comedy of New York City artist life written in 1914 by Edwin Arlington Robinson. It is one of Robinson's two published plays, published just before his volume of poems The Man Against the Sky. As of 1920, Van Zorn's only public performances was a 1917 run given in a Brooklyn hall by a semi-professional company. It has not fared so well in the hundred years since.

Van Zorn is about a fatalist who, attempting to play the part of destiny in a love affair, runs counter to a man with a destiny better than his own.

== Plot ==
The wealthy title character arrives in Greenwich Village after travels abroad. Van Zorn finds out that the painter Weldon Farnham, his best friend, is engaged to marry Villa Vannevar. Van Zorn has met Villa Vannevar once, and the play implies without stating outright that he is in love with her. He looks at the portraits Farnham has painted of Vannevar and believes that Farnham does not really know her, and is marrying her for her beauty. Van Zorn also finds out that George Lucas is in love with Vannevar, but that a previous relationship between the two ended in their separation by Vannevar's aunt. Van Zorn has strong powers of intuition, and realizes that Lucas will kill himself if Vannevar marries Farnham. He succeeds in convincing Lucas to give up alcohol and not to kill himself, and Vannevar to break off the engagement and marry Lucas instead; Van Zorn thus sacrifices his own happiness for that of others.

== Evaluations ==
A reviewer in The New York Times of November 15, 1914, upon the publication of the play, opined:

... it is to be noted with regret that so interesting a poet as Mr. Robinson should in the dramatic form be so halting in his utterance. His play is tantalizing. It has all the puckered brow and portentous manner of hidden meaning – but the meaning remains hidden even after a most attentive and respectful perusal.

There is all the suggestion of an effort at symbolism which may be and doubtless has been defined as the art of revelation by conceallment. But it is difficult to finish Mr. Robinson's comedy without reaching the conclusion that the conceallment here is due to inarticulateness. To read Van Zorn is to experience the baffling sensation of watching a play from the backdrop instead of from the first row in the orchestra. It is rather too bad to have to depend on the snapping of an ivory paper cutter in a character's fingers for a signal that a poignant moment is at hand. What you hear and see you seem to get by chance. At all events, it is not enough. Van Zorn lacks substance not because it is trivial but because – literally – it is not all there.

Edith J. R. Isaacs in The Encyclopedia Americana gives the following evaluation of the play:

Van Zorn is not, like so many poets' plays, a chamber drama. It is distinctly a play for the theater, a play of ideas such as would have found a ready welcome all over the continent. It is one of a limited number of good acting plays, which are literary as well, written by Americans. Van Zorn is a comedy of character ... The theme and the treatment are both unusual, the dialogue is brilliant and the characters, especially the men, are not theatrical types but thoroughly real people. Anyone familiar with Mr. Robinson's poetry would recognize in Van Zorn the author of “Richard Cory" and "Flammonde," his philosophy and his technique – especially his bold elisions – but no more disturbingly than he would recognise the dramatist in "Merlin" or "Ben Jonson Entertains a Man From Stratford." Van Zorn may be classed among important American plays even if it remains a play without a stage history.
