= The Man Who Died Twice =

The Man Who Died Twice may refer to:

== Literature ==
- "The Man Who Died Twice" (poem), a 1924 narrative poem by Edwin Arlington Robinson; winner of the 1925 Pulitzer Prize for Poetry
- "The Man Who Died Twice" (1927), a short story by Frank Belknap Long
- The Man Who Died Twice (1941), a novel by Sydney Horler
- The Man Who Died Twice (1951), a novel by George Harmon Coxe
- The Man Who Died Twice (1968), a novel by Lois Paxton
- The Man Who Died Twice (1976), a novel by Samuel Anthony Peeples
- The Man Who Died Twice (novel), a 2021 novel by Richard Osman

== Film and television ==
- The Man Who Died Twice (film), a 1958 American crime drama film directed by Joseph Kane

=== Television episodes ===
- "The Man Who Died Twice", Cannon season 5, episode 6 (1975)
- "The Man Who Died Twice (Part 1)", Case Closed season 26, episode 17 (2016)
- "The Man Who Died Twice (Part 2)", Case Closed season 26, episode 18 (2016)
- "The Man Who Died Twice", Death Valley Days season 12, episode 6 (1963)
- "The Man Who Died Twice", Scarecrow and Mrs. King season 4, episode 9 (1986)
- "The Man Who Died Twice", The Great Detective season 2, episode 7 (1980)
- "The Man Who Died Twice", The Third Man season 1, episode 2 (1959)

== See also ==
- The Man Who Died, the alternative title of The Escaped Cock, a 1929 short novel by D. H. Lawrence
