= Reuben Bright =

Sonnet by Edwin Arlington Robinson

Reuben Bright

Because he was a butcher and thereby
Did earn an honest living (and did right),
I would not have you think that Reuben Bright
Was any more a brute than you or I;
For when they told him that his wife must die
He stared at them, and shook with grief and fright,
And cried like a great baby half that night,
And made the women cry to see him cry.

And after she was dead, and he had paid
The singers and the sexton and the rest,
He packed a lot of things that she had made
Most mournfully away in an old chest
Of hers, and put some chopped-up cedar boughs
In with them, and tore down the slaughter-house.

"Reuben Bright" is a (modified) Petrarchan sonnet written by American poet Edwin Arlington Robinson, early in his career, and published in Children of the Night (1897). The poem acquired some fame as teaching material for English teachers.

== Form and summary ==
"Reuben Bright" is a sonnet with decasyllabic lines of iambic pentameter. Its structure is that of the Petrarchan sonnet according to Stephen Regan; its rhyme scheme is ABBA ABBA CDCD EE. In other words, the octet has two quatrains of enclosed rhyme, and the sestet has a quatrain of alternating rhyme and a concluding couplet.

The poem tells of a butcher, Reuben Bright, who might be supposed to be rough and unfeeling because of his profession, but when news is brought that his wife is to die, he cries like a baby. When she dies, he packs up all the articles she handcrafted in a chest and adds cedar boughs (a "traditional symbol of death") and then destroys the slaughter house. One critic said the poem shows "a man's devotion to his wife". Like many of Robinson's narrative sonnets, "Reuben Bright" has a "characteristic signature: usually a bizarre or extraordinary story", according to Donald Hall, who also noted that in its first printing the last line was altered significantly by a typo: the poem had been printed with the last line saying "tore down to the slaughter house".

== Critical appreciation ==
Robinson wrote "Reuben Bright" around the same time as "Richard Cory". David Perkins, in his A History of Modern Poetry (first published 1976), called some of those early poems including "Reuben Bright" and "Richard Cory" "revolutionary", with narrative elements of prose fiction brought into a lyric poetry written about realistic subject matter in vernacular language. Stephen Regan likewise notes the "plain-speaking, intimately conversational idiom". The poem's value, he argues, lies in the tension between that "matter-of-fact" language (and the close tonal connection between, for instance, "Bright" and "brute") and the psychological depths Robinson hints at, opened by the butcher's "capacity for deep feeling". Robinson critic Warner Berthoff had said that "Robinson is the poet of casualties; of broken lives and exhausted consciences", and Regan saw Reuben Bright as the best example of this quality.

Unlike a regular sonnet of this form whose dramatic turn can be expected to come between the octet and the sestet, "Reuben Bright" has no such dramatic change in "mood or attitude", just a narrative development. An ironic twist does not come until the last line, which, as Milton R. Stern noted, is a device frequently found in Robinson's poetry. Poet and critic Donald Hall also commented on the structure, and did note a kind of conclusion at the end of the octave: "Robinson's octave ends with wild grief; but the active imagination of the sestet is his genius--the cow-killer converted".

== Use in teaching literature ==
Milton Stern, writing in 1957, considered the sonnet to be an excellent poem to teach poetry to students who might have gotten jaded with traditional sonnets, and are challenged to try and figure out how the shocking ending results from the death of Bright's wife. That the poem does all this with rather ordinary language and without traditional poetic elements is important as well: "the student can more easily see that poetry does speak to our own human condition". According to Stern, "Robinson constantly takes 'little' people, 'ordinary' people, who lead the 'usual' life of all of us, and finds therein the dramatic, the poetic, and the human". In an article published two years after, Stern again suggested "Reuben Bright", along with a few other Robinson poems, as very useful "Poems for Teaching".

Martha Fisher, in a discussion of the process-intervention model in teaching literature, mentioned "Reuben Bright" (and "Richard Cory") as a narrative poem that students could be asked to rewrite as a short story or a play.
