= Richard Cory (disambiguation) =

Richard Cory may refer to:

- "Richard Cory", a poem by Edwin Arlington Robinson
- Richard Cory (song), a song by Simon and Garfunkel, based on the poem
- Richard Corey, American bullfighter

== See also ==
- Richard Cory-Wright
- Cory (surname)
