= Children of the Night (poetry collection) =

The Children of the Night: A Book of Poems
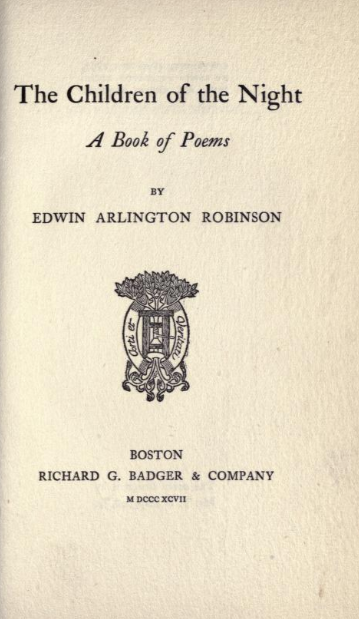
- Title page for The Children of the Night (1897)
- Author: Edwin Arlington Robinson
- Language: English
- Genre: Poetry
- Publication date: 1897
- Publication place: United States
- Media type: Print

The Children of the Night: A Book of Poems was the second volume of poetry published by the American poet Edwin Arlington Robinson. While the volume was weakly received, President Theodore Roosevelt's son Kermit introduced the work to his father who, knowing his straits, secured Robinson a job at the NY Customs Office.

== Content ==
Notable poems include "John Evereldown", "Richard Cory", "Reuben Bright", and "Luke Havergal" which was included in Harold Bloom's Best Poems of the English Language.
