= Miniver Cheevy =

1910 poem by Edwin Arlington Robinson

Miniver Cheevy

Miniver Cheevy, child of scorn,
Grew lean while he assailed the seasons;
He wept that he was ever born,
And he had reasons.

Miniver loved the days of old
When swords were bright and steeds were prancing;
The vision of a warrior bold
Would set him dancing.

Miniver sighed for what was not,
And dreamed, and rested from his labors;
He dreamed of Thebes and Camelot,
And Priam's neighbors.

Miniver mourned the ripe renown
That made so many a name so fragrant;
He mourned Romance, now on the town,
And Art, a vagrant.

Miniver loved the Medici,
Albeit he had never seen one;
He would have sinned incessantly
Could he have been one.

Miniver cursed the commonplace
And eyed a khaki suit with loathing;
He missed the medieval grace
Of iron clothing.

Miniver scorned the gold he sought,
But sore annoyed was he without it;
Miniver thought, and thought, and thought,
And thought about it.

Miniver Cheevy, born too late,
Scratched his head and kept on thinking;
Miniver coughed, and called it fate,
And kept on drinking.

"Miniver Cheevy" is a narrative poem written by Edwin Arlington Robinson, published in The Town down the River in 1910. The poem (written in quatrains of iambic tetrameter for three lines, followed by a catalectic line of only three iambs), relates the story of a hopeless romantic who spends his days thinking about what might have been if only he had been born in a nobler and more romantic era.

Some scholars suggest that the character of Miniver is meant to be Robinson's self-aware skewering of his own sense of being an anachronism or throwback, but others add that Miniver represents a critique of the general culture of Robinson's time. Regardless, the character portrait is similar to Robinson's Richard Cory, a deeply discontented individual unable to fit in with society and bent on self-destruction. Robinson's preoccupation with such characters is one of the reasons he was called "America's poet laureate of unhappiness."

== References in popular culture ==
- In Woody Allen's 2011 film Midnight in Paris, the lead character Gil is compared to Miniver Cheevy by a condescending friend of his fiancée.
- In Joseph Heller's Catch-22, Major Major Major Major is also compared with Miniver Cheevy because of his late birth.
- Helene Hanff compared herself to Miniver Cheevy, in her 1970 book 84, Charing Cross Road.
