= Case Closed season 27 =

Season of television series

Case Closed
- Season 27
- The cover of the first DVD compilation for season twenty-seven of Detective Conan released by Shogakukan
- No. of episodes: 41

Release
- Original network: NNS (ytv)
- Original release: April 29, 2017 – March 24, 2018

Season chronology
- ← Previous; Season 26 Next → Season 28

The twenty-seventh season of the Case Closed anime was directed by Yasuichiro Yamamoto and produced by TMS Entertainment and Yomiuri Telecasting Corporation. The series is based on Gosho Aoyama's Case Closed manga series. In Japan, the series is titled Detective Conan (名探偵コナン, Meitantei Conan) but was changed due to legal issues with the title Detective Conan. The episodes' plot follows Conan Edogawa's daily adventures.

The episodes use seven pieces of theme music: three openings and four endings. The first opening theme is Ikusen no Meikyuu de Ikusen no Nazo wo Toite (幾千の迷宮で 幾千の謎を解い, lit."Solving Thousands of Mysteries at Thousands of Labyrinths") by Breakerz which was used until episode 868. The second opening theme is Lie, Lie, Lie, by Maki Ohguro used for episodes 869 – 886. The third opening theme is Everything OK!! by Cellchrome and starts at episode 887. The first ending theme is YESTERDAY LOVE by Mai Kuraki which was used until episode 864. The second ending theme is Yume Monogatari (夢物語, lit."Dream Story") by Breakerz and starts at episode 865 and was used until episode 875. The third ending theme is Togetsukyō ~Kimi Omou~ (渡月橋 〜君 想ふ〜, lit."Togetsu Bridge ~Thinking About You~") by Mai Kuraki and starts at episode 876 and was used until episode 886. (This is also used for film 21: The Crimson Love Letter.) The fourth ending theme is Kamikaze Express (神風エクスプレス, lit."The Divine Wind Express") by Takuto with Miyakawa-kun and starts at episode 887.

The season initially ran from April 29, 2017, through March 24, 2018, on Nippon Television Network System in Japan. The season was later collected and released in ten DVD compilations by Shogakukan between January 25, 2019, and November 22, 2019, in Japan. Crunchyroll began simulcasting the series in October 2014, starting with episode 754.

== Episode list ==
No.	No. in season	Title	Directed by	Written by	Original air date
857	1	"The Shifting Mystery of Beika City (Part One)"; Transliteration: "Beika-chō Niten-santen Misuterī (Zenpen)" (Japanese: 米花町二転三転ミステリー（前編）)	Takanori Yano	Nobuo Ogizawa	April 29, 2017
The body of neighborhood nuisance Tatsuya Amagi is found in the park of a high-class neighborhood. He was stabbed numerous times by an awl-like weapon. Next to the body is the bloodstained medical examination card of neighborhood association president Hikoichi Bando. The police headed to Bando's home to question him but discover Bando has been poisoned with a combination of liquor and pesticides, and right to his body is a bloodstained awl.
858	2	"The Shifting Mystery of Beika City (Part Two)"; Transliteration: "Beika-chō Niten-santen Misuterī (Kōhen)" (Japanese: 米花町二転三転ミステリー（後編）)	Minoru Tozawa	Nobuo Ogizawa	May 6, 2017
A piece of evidence being discovered at Bando's home leads to college professor Yosuke Chino becoming the prime suspect. However, Conan realizes something is off about the case and reasons that the real killer framed Chino. Conan discovers an important clue at a café and realizes what really happened and the identity of the real killer.
859	3	"The Dark Mountain Route"; Transliteration: "Kurayami no Sangaku Rūto" (Japanese: 暗闇の山岳ルート)	Yoko Fukushima	Koshiro Mikami	May 13, 2017
While hiking, Conan and his friends meet four campers who have gathered to commemorate the death of their friend Motoki, who accidentally fell to his death three years ago. Takemi Yamakura, one of the campers, is found murdered the next morning at the bottom of a cliff. Suspicion falls on weather station employee Taro Hayashida but something about the case bothers Conan.
860	4	"The Security System's Pitfall"; Transliteration: "Bōhan Shisutemu no Otoshiana" (Japanese: 防犯システムの落とし穴)	Koichiro Kuroda	Junichi Iioka Yuki Notsuka	May 20, 2017
Kogoro is hired by Junko Miyoshi to catch a thief. While working the case, the body of Junko's neighbor Naotsugu Kitagami is discovered in the parking lot behind her apartment building. Kogoro believes Kitagami got drunk and accidentally fell from his apartment balcony. Inspector Megure and the police investigate the room and Conan finds it strange that Kitagami left his front door unlocked when his apartment was fully equipped with anti-theft devices. Conan questions Ryosuke Sawada, the resident of number 604 directly below Kitagami's and believes Kitagami's death was not an accident.
861	5	"Just Like a 17-Year-Old Crime Scene (Part One)"; Transliteration: "Jūnananen-mae to Onaji Genba (Zenpen)" (Japanese: 17年前と同じ現場（前編）)	Nobuharu Kamanaka	N/A	June 3, 2017
Real estate company president Kunihisa Hiyama is found murdered while holding a pair of scissors invented by Dr. Agasa. Conan and Subaru Okiya accompany Agasa to the crime scene. The man who discovered the body is former candy shop owner Kazunori Senba. Agasa suspects Senba is the murderer but it was impossible for Senba to have entered the house with a weapon. The current case closely resembles a 17-year-old case in several ways, such as the victim was holding on to a scissors and the sink was left running at the crime scene. Conan and Okiya watch as Senba recreates the steps he took when he discovered the body and notice several contradictions.
862	6	"Just Like a 17-Year-Old Crime Scene (Part Two)"; Transliteration: "Jūnananen-mae to Onaji Genba (Kōhen)" (Japanese: 17年前と同じ現場（後編）)	Akira Yoshimura	N/A	June 10, 2017
Conan and Subaru deduced that the culprit was Senba who made a blackjack using a sock and a heavy iron ball as a murder weapon. He then threw it along with the colored ball on the victim's roof to confuse Hiyama's bodyguards. Senba confessed that he committed the crime for revenge. He discovered that Hiyama planned the accident so that he can persuade his wife to sell him their land, where their candy shop was built, without his authorization. Before the episode end, Conan and Subaru rearranged the dying message left by Haneda Koji 17 years ago and soon discovered that "U MASCARA" actually means "ASACA RUM".
863	7	"The Spirit Detective's Murder (Part One)"; Transliteration: "Reikon Tantei Satsugai Jiken (Zenpen)" (Japanese: 霊魂探偵殺害事件（前編）)	Takanori Yano	N/A	June 17, 2017
Kogoro received a call from Hotta Gaito, a spirit detective who is going to summon the spirit of Haneda Koji. Kogoro and Conan met Kokuri Senpei, the Toto TV director at the hotel lobby and discovered Gaito dead on his bed. Kogoro saw a figure flew to the nearest balcony and decided to check if there were casualties in the next room and found out that Masumi Sera is the one living next door. Conan investigated the balcony and saw a car parked directly below the victim's balcony. He decided to take a picture of the car and under the victim's balcony not knowing that Mary Sera is hiding there. Conan left the room without realizing that his voice-changer bow tie had fallen from his pants and was picked up by Mary.
864	8	"The Spirit Detective's Murder (Part Two)"; Transliteration: "Reikon Tantei Satsugai Jiken (Kōhen)" (Japanese: 霊魂探偵殺害事件（後編）)	Minoru Tozawa	N/A	June 24, 2017
Conan realized the trick that the culprit used. He was about to explain his deduction when he noticed that his bow tie was missing. Kogoro started talking which startled Conan and he noticed that the voice was coming from the smartphone placed at the back of Kogoro's neck. It was revealed that Mary is using the bow tie and pointed out that the culprit is Senpei. He ran to the next room through the balcony in an attempt to escape but was later found by Conan to be lying unconscious. Before the episode end, Mary warned Sera to keep her guard up around Conan as he's nothing like the boy they met 10 years ago.
865	9	"The Foul-Mouthed Myna Bird"; Transliteration: "Kuchi no Warui Kyūkanchō" (Japanese: 口の悪い九官鳥)	Makiko Hayase	Masaki Tsuji	July 8, 2017
One afternoon, Conan, Genta and Mitsuhiko were playing soccer when a man screamed from a neighboring house. The victim was Naoko Kokubo who owned a myna bird. Conan found out the trick behind the murder, put Kogoro to sleep and revealed the murderer.
866	10	"The Traitor's Stage (Part One)"; Transliteration: "Uragiri no Sutēji (Zenpen)" (Japanese: 裏切りのステージ（前編）)	Nobuharu Kamanaka	N/A	July 15, 2017
The episode started with Zero who was running up the stairs and found his friend shot by Akai Shuichi who said 'Traitor will be punished'. Back to the present, Vermouth asked Bourbon to investigate something before it becomes public and destroy it if necessary. Ran, Conan, Subaru and Sonoko are cleaning Shinichi's house when Sonoko mentioned that an album titled "ASACA" will be released by a musician named Hado Rokumichi who wrote the lyrics 17 years ago. The four went to watch Rokumichi's rehearsal but was forbidden to enter. They then met Vermouth, disguised as Azusa, and Amuro. While everyone's busy, two guards who was about to conduct a fire inspection, found Rokumichi's corpse hanging on the stage. Vermouth asked Amuro about Subaru and Amuro saw Subaru wrote using his left-hand when he saw him using his right-hand previously [refer to Scarlet Pursuit episode].
867	11	"The Traitor's Stage (Part Two)"; Transliteration: "Uragiri no Sutēji (Kōhen)" (Japanese: 裏切りのステージ（後編）)	Nobuharu Kamanaka	N/A	July 22, 2017
Akai and Amuro reminisce their past with Scotch and Vermouth noticed that Amuro keeps on staring at Subaru. Meanwhile, Ran wonders why Azusa called her 'Angel' and remembered a woman who used the same name when she went to save Haibara [refer to episode 433-434]. Amuro and Subaru showed Inspector Megure and Takagi the trick and explained that the victim committed suicide, and Enjo Kanae made the crime scene look like he was murdered. Before the episode ended, it was revealed that Akai attempted to stop Scotch from committing suicide but Scotch chose to kill himself when he heard the sound of footsteps approaching which was misinterpreted by Zero when he arrived.
868	12	"The Whistling Bookstore"; Transliteration: "Kiteki no Kikoeru Koshoten" (Japanese: 汽笛の聞こえる古書店)	Koichiro Kuroda	Junichi Iioka Yuki Notsuka	July 29, 2017
The Detective Boys helped Tamaki Yujiro to bring the books he bought to his bookstore and as a goodwill, he offered to give them books for free. Tamaki Ichiro came to the store and argued with his father about his run down business and due to frustration, he knocked down one of the old bookshelf. When the Detective Boys passed by the bookstore, they saw the unconscious owner under the fallen bookshelves. Fortunately, Yujiro was doing fine at the hospital and he told the kids that he decided to close the bookstore. Conan revealed that it was Ichiko who caused the accident at the bookstore. He told them that he did it in order to stop his father from working and later turned himself to the police. Before the episode end, the old bookstore became a book café which was decided by Yujiro, Ichiko and his girlfriend.
869	13	"Conan Disappears Over a Cliff (Part One)"; Transliteration: "Dangai ni Kieta Conan (Zenpen)" (Japanese: 断崖に消えたコナン（前編）)	Akira Yoshimura	Junichi Miyashita	August 5, 2017
The episode started with the robbery of the group known as Zorro who murdered three residents of the home they broke into before burning it down. Professor Agasa and the Detective Boys went to a villa owned by Agasa's acquaintance but saw Isehara Yuji, injured by a crossbow, lying unconscious on the ground. Conan found Isehara's family photo and decided to give it back to him when he noticed a very suspicious man wearing military boots. Ran found out that the robbery took place near the villas where the kids are staying so she decided to follow them along with Kogoro. Conan set off by himself to investigate and he found a house where all bandits are gathered to kill Isehara. Conan managed to rescued him. The two ran through the woods as they're being pursued by the bandits but found themselves trapped on a cliff. Haibara and the detective boys happened to be on the other side and saw Isehara and Conan caught in the crossfire and then felling off the cliff. Ran and Kogoro met Agasa at the villa and he broke the news to them.
870	14	"Conan Disappears Over a Cliff (Part Two)"; Transliteration: "Dangai ni Kieta Conan (Kōhen)" (Japanese: 断崖に消えたコナン（後編）)	Takanori Yano	Junichi Miyashita	August 12, 2017
Kogoro asked the police to search the ocean immediately to look for Conan and Isehara but they failed to find them as the water is deep and fast. Believing that Conan is still alive, Haibara set off to find him. Conan and Isehara survived the cliff while Zorro and his men, assumed that Isehara is dead, planned to attack a jewellery exhibition that night. Haibara, with the help of Conan, was able to locate the two of them. Isehara then confirmed that the bandits' next target is Beika City Central Event Hall. The three robbers arrived at the location but found Conan waiting for them instead as the event got cancelled. The gang was surrounded by the police which led to their arrest. Conan later revealed through Agasa's voice, that the woman and the baby in the picture were not Isehara's. It was photo shopped to make Zorro believe that Isehara has a weakness but he is actually planning to steal the money from the gang and transferred the money to his account overseas.
871	15	"The Nobunaga 450 Case"; Transliteration: "Nobunaga Yon-gō-maru Jiken" (Japanese: ノブナガ四五〇事件)	Minoru Tozawa	Junichi Miyashita	September 2, 2017
The detective boys along with Professor Agasa arrived at Gifu Station to commemorate the 450th anniversary of General Oda Nobunaga's entry into the Gifu Castle. As they begin to sightseeing the city, Mitsuhiko and the rest watched a local hero show who called themselves Nobuna Gaizers. After the show, Mitsuhiko went back alone to get the heroes' signatures but ended up missing. They contacted the police and it is revealed that the Nobuna Gaizers are missing as well. Meanwhile at the Gifu City History Museum, a miniature solid gold Oda Nobunaga Statue, a golden tile and some ancient manuscripts got stolen. The CCTV show that the Nobuna Gaizers are the ones who robbed the museum. Conan began to investigate the case.
872	16	"Conan and Heiji's Nue Legend (Roar Chapter)"; Transliteration: "Conan to Heiji no Nue Densetsu (Nakigoe-hen)" (Japanese: コナンと平次の鵺伝説（鳴声編）)	Yoko Fukushima	N/A	September 9, 2017
At Cafe Poirot, Azusa reveals that she must have a doppelganger because she wasn't at the concert hall. Everyone began to wonder who the doppelgänger was (refer to ep 866-867). Heiji receives a letter from Densuke Takekuma, the mayor of Yadori village, saying he got a hint about the Takugawa's hidden treasure and is asking for help to unearth it. Heiji plans to confess to Kazuha at Kurogane Lake. Conan and his crew tag along and are taken by Densuke to a rundown hotel that was once popular but declined due to a cave-in incident that killed a foreign miner Charles Abel. At the hotel, the group meets a reporter named Hajime Tsurumi, an author named Fumie Masuko, historian Yasukatsu Someji and archeologist Michiki Tanzawa. A dog appears and takes a liking to Hajime but he doesn't like dogs. They discuss Charles's incident; he was still alive when found but couldn't speak due to his injuries, he wrote "nue" on a sheet of paper, horrifying his rescuers. Densuke wants to bring business back his town by recording their treasure hunt. At night, as everyone is preparing for bed, a nue appears from the flames of a fire, ripping a sign as it leaves. Conan and Heiji give chase and discover blood on the ground. They follow it into the forest and find Someji violently slashed across his back, dead.
873	17	"Conan and Heiji's Nue Legend (Scratch Chapter)"; Transliteration: "Conan to Heiji no Nue Densetsu (Tsumeato-hen)" (Japanese: コナンと平次の鵺伝説（爪跡編）)	Hiroya Saito	N/A	September 16, 2017
Someji's brutal murder is investigated.Among the visitors were Tanzawa Michiki the archaeologist, Masuko Fumie, an art school graduate who is knowledgeable about Japanese monsters, Someji the deceased documentary reporter/historian knowledgeable about Tokugawa's buried treasure and Hajime, a fledgling reporter who travels across the country for monster stories. Heiji was invited as a last minute resort because Kogoro and Kudo Shinichi are unavailable. Flames suddenly combust, a nue is heard screaming and Tanzawa is found dead from poison. Two sting marks are discovered under his chin. Densuke recalls a drop of water falling on his cheek the same moment Tanzawa was killed. Inspector Yokomizo Sango of Shizuoka Police arrives and sends in the Shizuoka Prefectural Military Self Defense Force to immobilize the area. Fumie denies involvement in the murders and Hajime was too far away from the scene of the crime.
874	18	"Conan and Heiji's Nue Legend (Resolution Chapter)"; Transliteration: "Conan to Heiji no Nue Densetsu (Kaiketsu-hen)" (Japanese: コナンと平次の鵺伝説（解決編）)	Nobuharu Kamanaka	N/A	September 23, 2017
Conan and Heiji realised that the dog barked when he heard nue's cry but when the monster appeared, it didn't barked at all. Kazuha and Ran brought all the items Heiji requested and they found an old photo of the excavation team from sixteen years ago. Conan and Heiji revealed that they are going to summon the Nue monster once again. Heiji and Conan begin to reveal the tricks the murderer used. The murderer is the author, Fumie Masuko. She killed the two men because they left the excavation team and her husband Charles to die. Charles had found a tetsuno (metal) hairpin and meant to ask the team what it was in Hiragana, but the ink bled through and they misunderstand the word to be the English alphabet n-u-e instead. Hajime Tsurumi is also revealed to be Masuko's son though she denied it. Heiji bring Kazuha to Kurogane Lake. As the morning sun turned the lake gold, Heiji realised the treasure the poem was talking about is actually about the beauty of Kurogane lake. As Heiji was about to confess to Kazuha, he got interrupted by the Self Defense Force who arrived to capture Nue. Ooka Momiji makes her first appearance in the end.
875	19	"The Mysterious Prophetic Buddha"; Transliteration: "Fushigi na Yochi Butsuzō" (Japanese: 不思議な予知仏像)	Koichiro Kuroda	Toyoto Kogiso	September 30, 2017
Kogoro, bring along Ran and Conan, is requested to investigate a Buddha statue rumored to have moved on its own. He meets Eikyo Fukuhara, his family (wife Masako, daughter Yuka, and son Eizen) and Buddhist trainee Junko Wakuda. After dinner, Eikyo leaves to go pray and is later found dead with a knife in his neck. Kogoro, after finding clues thanks to Conan, declares Junko to be the killer after he attempted to scare Eikyo. Junko confesses but Conan isn't satisfied. After finding rice powder near the victim, Kogoro is tranquilized and Conan reveals Masako to be the real killer. She discovered Junko's scare tactic had failed, stabbed her husband to death and framed Junko for the murder. Masako confesses stating Eikyo's rude and cruel treatment to his family as her motive and has a sense of relief now that he is dead. She maniacally laughs over her actions as she is arrested.
876	20	"The Mechanical Eyewitness"; Transliteration: "Kikai-jikake no Mokugekisha" (Japanese: 機械じかけの目撃者)	Akira Yoshimura	Hiro Masaki	October 7, 2017
Kogoro, Ran and Conan arrived at Kusumi Machinery to conduct investigation as the President Kusumi Kyoichi suspect his workers of stealing components and leaking information to his rival company. At night, there is a sudden gas leak and Tanizaki Takeshi is killed. Conan tranquilized Kogoro and use the victim's robot mouse to solve the case.
877	21	"A Pair of Crossing Fates"; Transliteration: "Kōsa-suru Unmei no Futari" (Japanese: 交差する運命の二人)	Takanori Yano	Nobuo Ogizawa	October 14, 2017
The episode started with a robbery taking place in an old woman's house at Oku-Beika. As the robber who is wearing a red jacket begin to escape, he knock over Genta who is blocking his way. The robber collided with another man and both of them roll down the hill. The detective boys decided to caught the robber. Meanwhile, a man wearing a red jacket went to the police claiming he can't remember who he is. So what really happened??
878	22	"The Blind Spot in the Changing Room (Part One)"; Transliteration: "Shichakushitsu no Shikaku (Zenpen)" (Japanese: 試着室の死角（前編）)	Minoru Tozawa	N/A	October 28, 2017
At a department store, Ran, Sonoko and Sera decide to try on swimsuits to go to the pool. Sera purposely choose a swimsuit similar to what she wore 10 years ago, to make Conan remember her. Conan did recall some memories but still can't remember exactly where he met Sera before. At Simusa, Sashihara Ritsuko is found dead at their changing room. She left a dying message with lipstick on her right thumb and her left thumb and index finger sticking out.
879	23	"The Blind Spot in the Changing Room (Part Two)"; Transliteration: "Shichakushitsu no Shikaku (Kōhen)" (Japanese: 試着室の死角（後編）)	Hiroya Saito	N/A	November 4, 2017
The investigation of the murder continue. After discussion, the police and suspects realised there is another customer as their white sandal was outside the right changing room. Detective Takagi asked the three suspects to draw out the white sandals. Conan and Sera managed to figure out who the true culprit was. As different countries use their fingers to count differently and through the different terms Sera used to describe sports and her table manner, Conan realised she studied in England and not in America. With the clue "England", Conan finally remember where he met Sera before.
880	24	"The Detective Boys and the Haunted House"; Transliteration: "Tantei-dan to Yūrei Yakata" (Japanese: 探偵団と幽霊館)	Hiroaki Takagi	Toyoto Kogiso	November 11, 2017
The Detective boys who went for camping ended up at a mansion to avoid the rain. Strange things has been happening at the mansion lately and according to the master Otaguro Nobuteru, the mansion is haunted by a yellowish white ghost. The ghost is apparently the master's wife who died two months ago. As the detective boys begin to investigate, they saw a wheelchair moving on its own, a woman voice replying to Otaguro san and the door opening by itself. Conan begin to investigate and solve the case.
881	25	"The Magician of the Waves (Part One)"; Transliteration: "Sazanami no Mahōtsukai (Zenpen)" (Japanese: さざ波の魔法使い（前編）)	Nobuharu Kamanaka	N/A	November 18, 2017
As Conan finally remember Sera (ep 878-879), he begin to recall from 10 years ago. At the beach, young Sera meet her oldest brother Akai Shuichi for the first time. Akai and his mother Mary got into a fight as he wanted to join the FBI to investigate the truth about his father's case. Young Shinichi met the Akai family for the first time and mistaken Akai Shuichi as a circus pierrot because his eye injury look like a tear makeup. As Akai clear up the misunderstanding, Shinichi introduce himself as Sherlock Holmes's apprentice. Young Shinichi, Ran and Sera met for the first time. A car flew off from the cliff and sunk into the ocean. Akai Shuichi begin to investigate and request Shinichi to help him with the case.
882	26	"The Magician of the Waves (Part Two)"; Transliteration: "Sazanami no Mahōtsukai (Kōhen)" (Japanese: さざ波の魔法使い（後編）)	Akira Yoshimura	N/A	November 25, 2017
Akai revealed that the people involved in the car accident are actually robbers that steal branded watches. The driver died from the accident while his accomplice escape from the car and blended into the crowd. Yukiko called Yusaku to talk about the case. Akai figure out who the culprit is based on the suspects' attire while Yusaku and Shinichi figure out based on their watches. Only the culprit's watch displayed 10:10 which is generally what the watches in stores are displayed so that customers can clearly see the brand of the watches. Mary realised Shuichi is really similar to her husband Akai Tsutomu and finally agree to him joining the FBI. Sera think Shinichi is a magician as he keep making her brother laugh, something she hasn't being successful with. Conan finally remember Sera and he begin to suspect that she wore the similar swimsuit to make him remember. Conan also begin to suspect that Sera knew his true identity. He connected the dot and realised Shukichi is her second older brother and the Sister From Another Domain must be her mother Mary, who also shrunk from taking the APTX 4869.
883	27	"The Pop-up Book Bomber (Part One)"; Transliteration: "Ehon Kara Tobidasu Bakudanma (Zenpen)" (Japanese: 絵本から飛び出す爆弾魔（前編）)	Koichiro Kuroda	Junichi Miyashita	December 2, 2017
The episode started with Kogoro running toward Kanematsu Park and request the crowd to run away as he has a bomb with him. Five hours ago, a bomb exploded at Pachinko Parlor Sandcastle. Meanwhile at Mori Agency, Kogoro received a pop up storybook called "Grandpa Tick Tock and the Three Clocks" by Imai Kenichi and a smartphone through delivery. Kogoro, Ran and Conan realised that the book and smartphone contain hints about the next bombing location. The police managed to identify the suspect, Hirukawa Takuji as his fingerprints were discovered at the bomb site. They managed to find the second bomb and the bomber request Kogoro to deliver the bomb to the park before time runs out. After finding the correct park from three different location, Kogoro threw the bomb into the sewage and it didn't explode. However the bomber inform them the game isn't over yet. Using the book, they found out they had to "deliver the final bomb to the middle of the 7" leaving the group to wonder what is the middle of 7 is.
884	28	"The Pop-up Book Bomber (Part Two)"; Transliteration: "Ehon Kara Tobidasu Bakudanma (Kōhen)" (Japanese: 絵本から飛び出す爆弾魔（後編）)	Takanori Yano	Junichi Miyashita	December 9, 2017
The police department begin to find locations related to the number 7. They found three bombs at three different locations. However all 3 turn out to be fakes. Meanwhile the suspect disguise as a policeman, cause a Megrez Security vehicle to explode using the second bomb that flow down the sewage. The vehicle have a picture of Ursa Major printed on it, Conan and Ran realised it is the Big Dipper and the Center star is Megrez, the middle of 7. The police received an anonymous tip stating the address of the bomber hideout, requesting them to arrest him. Conan figure out the case and tranqulized Kogoro to solve it.
885	29	"Solving Mysteries at the Poirot Café (Part One)"; Transliteration: "Nazotoki wa Kissa Poirot de (Zenpen)" (Japanese: 謎解きは喫茶ポアロで（前編）)	Minoru Tozawa	N/A	December 16, 2017
Heiji and Kazuha arrived at Mori Agency to see the light illumination at Kinza Block 4. While the girls stay at Mori Agency to cook dinner for Kogoro, the boys decided to head to Cafe Poirot to wait for them. Heiji plan to confess to Kazuha but that day is Friday the 13th, an unlucky day. Heiji met Amuro Tooru for the first time and asked Conan who he is but Amuro requested Conan to keep his identity a secret. At the table next to Heiji and Conan, the Beika University Drama Club members gather to celebrate one of their members Yui's birthday. When they try to charge their laptop, a blackout occur and Anzai Tengo is stabbed. There is also another mysterious patron who called himself Wada Shinichi.
886	30	"Solving Mysteries at the Poirot Café (Part Two)"; Transliteration: "Nazotoki wa Kissa Poirot de (Kōhen)" (Japanese: 謎解きは喫茶ポアロで（後編）)	Hiroya Saito	N/A	December 23, 2017
Wada Shinichi recite the One Hundred Poems by One Hundred Poets as a hint to help Conan and Heiji solve the case. Kazuha and Ran went to see the light illumination. As Kazuha is feeling sad without Heiji by her side, Ran decide to act like Heiji and confess to her to cheer her up. Kazuha thanked Ran for her efforts. The case has been solved however Heiji failed to confess to Kazuha once again as they have to rush to take the train back home. Detective Takagi discovered that the mysterious man Wada Shinichi has disappeared. Ran explained that Wada Shinichi may have been a fake name as that was Watson's Japanese name in Meiji Era. Wada Shinichi is revealed to be Iori Muga, Otsuka Momiji's Family Butler.
887	31	"Kaito Kid and the Trick Box (Part One)"; Transliteration: "Kaitō Kiddo no Karakuribako (Zenpen)" (Japanese: 怪盗キッドの絡繰箱（前編）)	Hiroaki Takagi	N/A	January 6, 2018
Tomoyose Kimika, an old lady wanted to open a trick box called "Mokujin" left by her recently decreased husband. This box is made by mid-19th century tinkerer, Samizu Kichiemon. The old lady claimed that the world 's largest moonstone "Luna Memoria" is inside the box. As Okiya Subaru exit the house after overhearing Conan and Haibara's conversation, he realised he is being photographed in secret. The group gathered in Suzuki Library to try and open the box while Kaito Kid try to get in by disguising as one of them in order to steal the jewel. The group have to find the instruction paper to open the box which is hidden among the ten thousand of books in the library. Conan sense Kaito Kid's presence and wonder who he is disguising as.
888	32	"Kaito Kid and the Trick Box (Part Two)"; Transliteration: "Kaitō Kiddo no Karakuribako (Kōhen)" (Japanese: 怪盗キッドの絡繰箱（後編）)	Yoshitaka Nagaoka	N/A	January 13, 2018
Conan continue to wonder who did Kaito Kid disguise himself into. Ran climb up a chair in order to reach a book she is interested in. As she is trying to reach it, Conan blushed as he could almost see her underwear. Haibara accuse him of being a huge pervert. Through the various clues Tomoyose Kimika san talk about, Conan is able to figure out where the instruction paper is at. A blackout suddenly occur and Kaito Kid seem to have open the box and steal its content. Tomoyose Kimika decided that Kaito Kid can have the moonstone while she value the exchange diary even more. Conan find the real Kaito Kid hiding in the restroom and figure out he didn't open the box yet. Kaito Kid explained that he already stolen the moonstone once before and only came here to accept the challenge. As Kaito Kid is ready to leave, he realised the door is being blocked by Okiya Subaru who requested him to return the photograph he took. Kaito Kid cause a blackout once again, left his phone and disappear.
889	33	"The New Teacher's Skeleton Case (Part One)"; Transliteration: "Shinnin Kyōshi no Gaikotsu Jiken (Zenpen)" (Japanese: 新任教師の骸骨事件（前編）)	Akira Yoshimura	N/A	January 20, 2018
Wakasa Rumi is introduced. She will be acting as an assistant homeroom teacher for Conan's class. Conan thought it is unusual to get assistant this late in the year. Wakasa Rumi sensei appeared to be clumsy and timid. Wakasa Sensei, Conan and the detective boys went to the old storage to get some lime. In there, they discovered a 10 year old skeleton in the basement. The skeleton is seen holding a strange string with Chinese characters on it. Wakasa sensei "accidentally" ripped off a schedule giving Conan a hint to solve the case.
890	34	"The New Teacher's Skeleton Case (Part Two)"; Transliteration: "Shinnin Kyōshi no Gaikotsu Jiken (Kōhen)" (Japanese: 新任教師の骸骨事件（後編）)	Mamiko Sekiya	N/A	January 27, 2018
Thanks to Wakasa sensei's clue, Conan realised the code is link to the schedule but he didn't manage to solve the code entirely. The news of a skeleton and the code being discovered was all over the news online. After school, Wakasa sensei approach the detective boys once again to get the lime from the old storage. The detective boys discovered the storage room has been ransacked and it seem like the culprit is looking for something. Wakasa sensei give further hint and Conan finally figure out the code. He realised the code is connected to the robbery case 10 years ago. At night, Conan and the detective boys set a trap to lead the robbers into the basement. Inspector Shiratori appear to arrest them however one of the thief is still outside and attacked Shiratori. The robbers ordered the detective boys to go into the basement. Once they are in, Wakasa sensei pretended to fall and knock one of the robbers unconscious. She displayed amazing fighting skills, unlike her timid and clumsy self. She took out 3 men by herself and when Conan and the detective boys finally got out of the basement, she pretended to wildly swing her weapon and state that it was pure luck that the men got knocked out.
891	35	"Bakumatsu Revolution Mystery Tour (Yamaguchi Arc)"; Transliteration: "Bakumatsu Ishin Misuterī Tsuā (Yamaguchi-hen)" (Japanese: 幕末維新ミステリーツアー（山口編）)	Koichiro Kuroda	Toshimichi Okawa	February 3, 2018
Kogoro, Ran and Conan travel to the Yamaguchi Prefecture as Korogo received a letter from a mysterious person named Kurataya Komakichi who wanted to give him a family treasure. They meet Natsume Asuka, a news site reporter. When Kogoro told her that he is meeting Kurataya Komakichi, she inform the police and Korogo got arrested. It turned out Kurataya Komakichi is the suspect in an armed robbery a year ago who has stolen millions of yen worth of Kiecho coins. After getting released, Asuka San explained the situation to Kogoro and he decided to take on the case. While investigating, Kogoro is almost shot by the culprit but Conan managed to save him.
892	36	"Bakumatsu Revolution Mystery Tour (Hagi Arc)"; Transliteration: "Bakumatsu Ishin Misuterī Tsuā (Hagi-hen)" (Japanese: 幕末維新ミステリーツアー（萩編）)	Hiroya Saito	Toshimichi Okawa	February 10, 2018
After the shooting occurred, Kogoro informed the police for investigation. The police wanted to protect Kogoro but he escape instead. Asuka san get kidnapped by the culprit and left her phone behind. She ended up on a conveyor belt, sending her to a burning furnace, Conan managed to save her in time. Meanwhile Kogoro went to Shizuki Park in attempt to find Asuka san. The culprit try to shoot Kogoro through the bushes but the police manage to protect him. Conan and Kogoro figure out the culprit and solve the case.
893	37	"The Mystery of the Michelin Starred Restaurant"; Transliteration: "Hoshitsuki Resutoran no Nazo" (Japanese: 星付きレストランの謎)	Takanori Yano	Junichi Miyashita	February 24, 2018
Kogoro, Ran and Conan arrived at Cucina Eigo Restaurant. Once they are inside, they find the restaurant's setting similar to the mystery of Mary Celeste. It is a famous 19th century unsolved case happened on a ship. A crew of ten people disappeared into thin air and the ship was found adrift. All five guests are also missing from their seats. They found the chef Kichiishi Eigo collapsed on the floor, head wounded and the word "curse" pinned on the door using a knife. They then discovered five set of footprints and shoes leading to the lake. Police arrived and Kichiishi Eigo shared that there were five guests from a company called Onda Trading. As they are investigating, the chef Kichiishi Eigo suddenly disappear and seem to walk into the lake like the five other customers. Conan begin to investigate and solve the case.
894	38	"The Tokyo-Style Detective Show Next Door (Part One)"; Transliteration: "Tonari no Edomae Suiri Shō (Zenpen)" (Japanese: となりの江戸前推理ショー（前編）)	Minoru Tozawa	N/A	March 3, 2018
Kogoro, Ran and Conan are watching horse racing at Mouri Detective Agency. Kogoro lost all of his bettings on the horse race and say it is his unlucky day. Conan notice one of his betting ticket, the Pirate's Spirit from race 9 won and Kogoro win one million yen. He decided to celebrate by having sushi at Beika Irohazushi next door for dinner. At Beika Irohazushi, Wakita Kanenori, a cook with a wounded eye is introduced. He say he is a drifter and not the type of guy to settle down in one place. Conan recalled that Rum injured an eye in some accident and one of Rum's eye is an artificial one. When Conan ask him about his eye, Wakita Kanenori say its a real mess and offered to show him his eye. Conan declined the offer. Wakita ask Kogoro about the cases he solved as he love mysteries since he was little. Three other patrons appeared in the store and ordered sushi. A woman called Hijirisawa Suzuyo appeared and claimed that her pouch is stolen. She managed to find her pouch in the restroom but her ticket that worth a million yen is missing.
895	39	"The Tokyo-Style Detective Show Next Door (Part Two)"; Transliteration: "Tonari no Edomae Suiri Shō (Kōhen)" (Japanese: となりの江戸前推理ショー（後編）)	Hiroaki Takagi	N/A	March 10, 2018
Wakita Kanenori and Conan begin to investigate on the case. Wakita Kanenori make a deduction on the culprit however it turn out to be wrong. Ran decide to confess to the lady about the ticket but it turn out the lady lose a different ticket and not the one Kogoro has. As everyone is leaving, Conan tranquilized Kogoro and solve the case. After the case, Wakita Kanenori request to be Kogoro's apprentice. Kogoro agreed after he was given a discount on his sushi. Sadly, Kogoro turn in his ticket to the police.
896	40	"The Woman With White Hands (Part One)"; Transliteration: "Shiroi Te no Onna (Zenpen)" (Japanese: 白い手の女（前編）)	Nobuharu Kamanaka	N/A	March 17, 2018
At an apartment that Wakasa sensei is staying at, she overheard a couple arguing. Her neighbour Banno Teigo wanted to break up with his girlfriend however she demanded money from him. Meanwhile at school, Conan is rehearsing for a play. Conan recalled playing the same role of "Ikkyu-san" when he was in his third year of grade school. He received acting tips from his mother Yukiko and script adjustment from his father Yusaku. When Wakasa sensei try to change a bucket of black water, she fall down and as a result the tiger painting of a folding screen got damaged. Conan and the detective boys decide to go to Wakasa sensei's house to repaint the painting. As they reached her apartment, they saw a yellow haired woman pressing the door bell of Banno's apartment repeatedly before leaving. After they finished the painting, loud music was heard from the neighbour apartment. Genta went to complain, find the door unlocked and discover the couple collapsed on the floor. Banno san woke up however his girlfriend ended up dead. He say that a strange woman zapped him and she apparently wrote "I love you" in red on his right cheek. Conan smell make up on Genta's hand and concluded the culprit is Banno Teigo.
897	41	"The Woman With White Hands (Part Two)"; Transliteration: "Shiroi Te no Onna (Kōhen)" (Japanese: 白い手の女（後編）)	Akira Yoshimura	N/A	March 24, 2018
Conan became suspicious of Wakasa after finding a receipt she purchase just that morning. Even though Conan knew the culprit is Banno Teigo, he still haven't figure out the trick he used to write the words on his face. After realising he overthink things, Conan solved the trick the culprit used. However, Banno Teigo got angry and attempt to escape. Wakasa sensei protected the detective boys, pretend to fall down while tripping him and knock him out cold. Outside, the reporters took picture of Wakasa sensei, Ayumi, Genta and Mitsuhiko and reported the case online and in newspaper. Hyoue Kuroda and Wakita Kanenori are seen watching the news closely.

== Home media release ==
Shogakukan/Being (Japan, Region 2 DVD)
Volume	Episodes^{Jp.}	Release date	Ref.
Volume 1	857-858, 860, 865	January 25, 2019	
Volume 2	861-864	February 22, 2019	
Volume 3	866-867, 869-870	March 22, 2019	
Volume 4	871-874	April 26, 2019	
Volume 5	868, 875-877	May 24, 2019	
Volume 6	878-879, 881-882	June 21, 2019	
Volume 7	883-886	July 26, 2019	
Volume 8	887-890	August 23, 2019	
Volume 9	891-892, 894-895	September 20, 2019	
Volume 10	880, 893, 896-897	November 22, 2019	
