= Edwin Arlington Robinson House =

Historic house in Maine, United States

- U.S. National Register of Historic Places
- U.S. National Historic Landmark
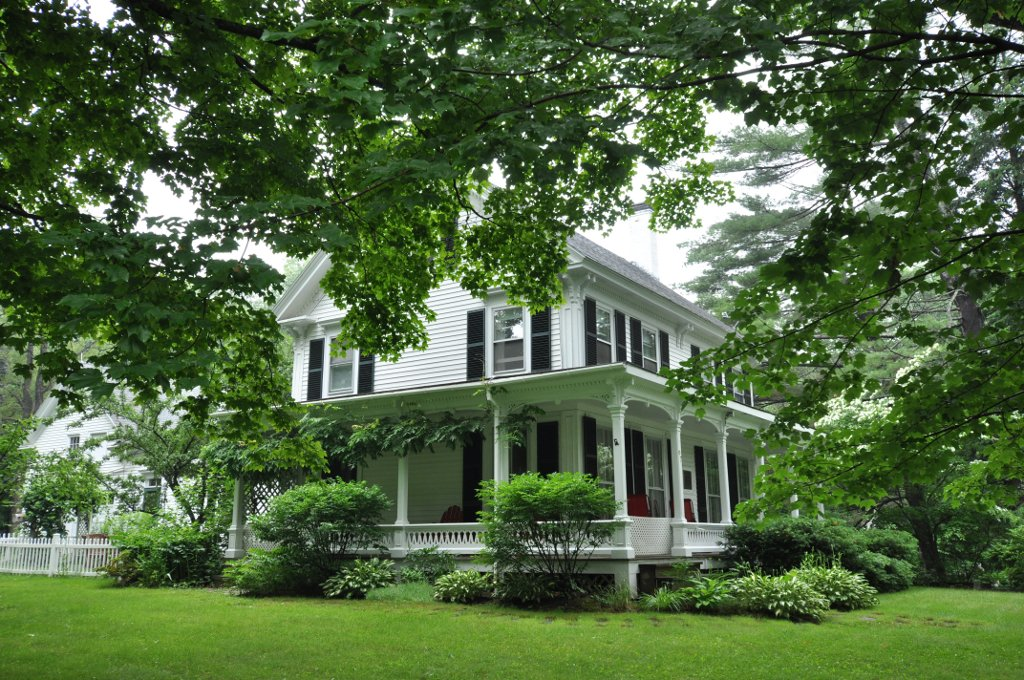

- Location within Maine Location within the United States
- Interactive map showing the location for Edwin Arlington Robinson House
- Location: Gardiner, Maine
- Coordinates: 44°13′20″N 69°46′25″W
- Area: less than one acre
- NRHP reference No.: 71000070

Significant dates
- Added to NRHP: November 11, 1971
- Designated NHL: November 11, 1971

The Edwin Arlington Robinson House is an historic house at 67 Lincoln Avenue in Gardiner, Maine. A two-story wood-frame house, it was designated a National Historic Landmark in 1971 for its association with Edwin Arlington Robinson (1869–1935) one the United States' leading poets of the late 19th and early 20th centuries.

== Description and history ==
The Robinson House is set on the west side of Lincoln Street, just north of its junction with Danforth Street in a residential area south of Gardiner's central business district. It is a 2 1/2-story wood-frame structure, with a side-gable roof, two interior chimneys, and clapboard siding. A single-story porch, supported by square posts with decorative sawn arched woodwork between, wraps around the (east-facing) front and left side. The front is five bays wide, with a center entrance flanked by full-length sash windows, with four shorter sash windows on the second level. A two-story bay window projects to the north, and a 1 1/2-story ell extends to the rear of the house.

The first floor of the house is divided into two double parlors by a central staircase, with the dining room and kitchen in the ell. The second floor is divided into bedrooms, one of which has been converted into a bathroom, with a small study at the north side bay window that was used by Robinson for his writing. His bedroom was a small chamber located just to the west of the staircase. The attic space has been finished in the 20th century with a bedroom and bathroom.

Robinson's parents moved into this house in 1870, when he was about one year old. He grew up in this house, leaving in 1891 to attend Harvard College. He studied there for two years as a special student, and returned here in 1893. By this time he had already begun writing poetry, and had apparently decided to make it his profession. His first work, The Torrent and the Night Before, was published in 1896, the year he moved out of the house, ultimately dividing his time between Gardiner, New York City, Boston, and the MacDowell Colony in New Hampshire. The house remained in the family until 1903, and is still privately owned.

== Significance ==
Robinson was a leading American poet of the late 19th and early 20th centuries, and was honored with three Pulitzer Prizes for his work. His work was appreciated by Theodore Roosevelt, who acquired for him a sinecure posting at the custom house in New York. Robinson's work was a study of the human condition, often quite dark, but with revealing aspects of light. In addition to his early works, he also won acclaim for his 1916 The Man Against the Sky. Robinson died in New York in 1935, and is buried in the cemetery behind this house.

== See also ==
- List of National Historic Landmarks in Maine
- National Register of Historic Places listings in Kennebec County, Maine
