= Case Closed season 26 =

Season of television series

Case Closed
- Season 26
- The cover of the first DVD compilation for season twenty-six of Detective Conan released by Shogakukan
- No. of episodes: 39

Release
- Original network: NNS (ytv)
- Original release: May 21, 2016 – April 22, 2017

Season chronology
- ← Previous; Season 25 Next → Season 27

The twenty-sixth season of the Case Closed anime was directed by Yasuichiro Yamamoto and produced by TMS Entertainment and Yomiuri Telecasting Corporation. The series is based on Gosho Aoyama's Case Closed manga series. In Japan, the series is titled Detective Conan (名探偵コナン, Meitantei Conan) but was changed due to legal issues with the title Detective Conan. The episodes' plot follows Conan Edogawa's daily adventures.

The episodes use five pieces of theme music: two openings and three endings. The first opening theme is Sekai wa Anata no Iro ni Naru (世界はあなたの色になる, lit."The World Will Become Your Color") by B'z which was used until episode 844. (This is also used for film 20: The Darkest Nightmare.) The second opening theme is Ikusen no Meikyuu de Ikusen no Nazo wo Toite (幾千の迷宮で 幾千の謎を解い, lit."Solving Thousands of Mysteries at Thousands of Labyrinths") by Breakerz and starts at episode 845. The first ending theme is Futari no Byōshin (ふたりの秒針, lit."The Clock's Second Hand") by Takuto which was used until episode 826. The second ending theme is SAWAGE☆LIFE by Mai Kuraki and starts at episode 827 and was used until episode 842. The third ending theme is YESTERDAY LOVE by Mai Kuraki and starts at episode 843.

The season initially ran from May 21, 2016, through April 22, 2017, on Nippon Television Network System in Japan. The season was later collected and released in ten DVD compilations by Shogakukan between January 26, 2019, and November 23, 2019, in Japan. Crunchyroll began simulcasting the series in October 2014, starting with episode 754.

== Episode list ==
No.	No. in season	Title	Directed by	Written by	Original air date
818	1	"Kogoro's Pursuit of Rage (Part 1)"; Transliteration: "Kogorō, Ikari no Daitsuiseki (Zenpen)" (Japanese: 小五郎、怒りの大追跡（前編）)	Akira Yoshimura	Toshimichi Okawa	May 21, 2016
Ran attends a concert of Risa Purple, a rising idol. Kogoro is also acting as her bodyguard. However, before the performance can start, Ran is mistaken for Risa and is kidnapped. Things take a turn for the worse when the kidnappers find out their mistake and try to bury Ran alive to cover their tracks.
819	2	"Kogoro's Pursuit of Rage (Part 2)"; Transliteration: "Kogorō, Ikari no Daitsuiseki (Kōhen)" (Japanese: 小五郎、怒りの大追跡（後編）)	Takanori Yano	Toshimichi Okawa	May 28, 2016
Conan and Kogoro set a trap for the culprit and the real culprit behind the kidnapping is captured and Ran is rescued and rushed to the hospital.
820	3	"The Seven People in the Waiting Room"; Transliteration: "Machiaishitsu no Nana-nin" (Japanese: 待合室の7人)	Minoru Tozawa	Junichi Miyashita	June 4, 2016
Seven people, including Kogoro, Ran and Conan, are caught in a typhoon and forced to take shelter in a train station, along with the station master and his assistant. Kogoro receives a warning that a murder will occur. The murder occurs in the middle of the night, with no one knowing who the murderer is. Will Conan figure out the culprit before a second murder occurs?
821	4	"The Hidden Secret of Dongaraji Temple"; Transliteration: "Dongara-ji ga Kakusu Himitsu" (Japanese: 曇柄寺が隠す秘密)	Yoko Fukushima	Nobuo Ogizawa	June 11, 2016
Conan and Kogoro follow different tracks which finally leads them to detectives Takagi and Chiba, who are out searching for the man who committed a 30 million yen robbery from a bank.
822	5	"The Suspects Are a Passionate Couple (Part 1)"; Transliteration: "Yōgisha wa Netsuai Kappuru (Zenpen)" (Japanese: 容疑者は熱愛カップル（前編）)	Yoshitaka Fujimoto	N/A	June 18, 2016
A rumor is floating around that Yoko Okino and soccer star Ryusuke Higo are dating when they are seen together. Yoko fan Kogoro, Conan, and Higo fan Haibara decide to investigate if the news is true. They end up in an Italian restaurant belonging to Higo's former teammate, Teiya Asuka, who is discovered in a storeroom with his throat cut.
823	6	"The Suspects Are a Passionate Couple (Part 2)"; Transliteration: "Yōgisha wa Netsuai Kappuru (Kōhen)" (Japanese: 容疑者は熱愛カップル（後編）)	Toshio Kiuchi	N/A	June 25, 2016
Everyone seems to be a suspect. Conan continues his investigation and discovers how the murder was done and who did it.
824	7	"The Detective Boys Get Out of the Rain"; Transliteration: "Shōnen Tantei-dan no Amayadori" (Japanese: 少年探偵団の雨宿り)	Koichiro Kuroda	Tatsuro Inamoto	July 9, 2016
The Detective Boys take shelter from rain in a house filled with toys. As Genta is struggling to go to the toilet, they ask the two men in the house to let them in for a bit. It turns out that all is not as it seems, when they hear a woman shout out for help from within the house.
825	8	"The Tidal Park Comeback Case"; Transliteration: "Shioiri Kōen Gyakuten Jiken" (Japanese: 潮入り公園逆転事件)	Akira Yoshimura	Hiro Masaki	July 16, 2016
Conan, Ran and Mouri visit a tidal park in Chiba Prefecture. Kogoro is about to take them to a seafood restaurant for dinner when they discover a body on a flood bridge.
826	9	"The Beauty, The Lies, and The Secrets"; Transliteration: "Bijo to Uso to Himitsu" (Japanese: 美女とウソと秘密)	Takanori Yano	Toshimichi Okawa	July 23, 2016
Conan, Kogoro and Ran come across the scene of an accident. A man named Takeshi Yaginuma fell to his death from the staircase of a parking structure. On top of the stairs is Misaki Takizawa, who claims Yaginuma attacked her and accidentally fell. During the investigation, it is discovered Yaginuma is a criminal who broke into Misaki's home and murdered her husband, Akira, and stole 100 million yen worth of precious jewels. Kogoro believes Yaginuma attacked Misaki to silence her, but Conan suspects there's something wrong with Misaki's testimony.
827	10	"Ramen So Good, It's to Die For 2 (Part 1)"; Transliteration: "Shinu Hodo Umai Rāmen 2 (Zenpen)" (Japanese: 死ぬほど美味いラーメン2（前編）)	Minoru Tozawa	N/A	July 30, 2016
Conan, Ran, and Sonoko are taken to Sera's regular ramen spot, Ramen Ogura, where a murder previously occurred. Inside they find regulars Shono Yuna, Mizushina Sosuke, and Nakanishi Osamu eating. Conan finds the great quantities of condiments and seasoning they put in the food strange. After they leave, employee Sayo reveals a robbery-murder occurred in the neighborhood a few days earlier. The police chased the culprit into the restaurant, and the customers present at the time were Shono, Mizushina and Nakanishi.
828	11	"Ramen So Good, It's to Die For 2 (Part 2)"; Transliteration: "Shinu Hodo Umai Rāmen 2 (Kōhen)" (Japanese: 死ぬほど美味いラーメン2（後編）)	Makiko Hayase	N/A	August 6, 2016
The police have narrowed the suspects down to three regulars of the shop: Shono, Mizushina and Nakanishi. After the incident, Yumi ran into her ex-boyfriend Haneda, who says he heard a strange noise every time the culprit took a step. Upon hearing Haneda's story, Conan realizes something. He and Sera solve the mystery behind the reason the culprit was swinging a hose around after committing the crime, determine the reason the culprit continued to visit the shop, and close in on the truth.
829	12	"The Mysterious Boy"; Transliteration: "Fushigi na Shōnen" (Japanese: 不思議な少年)	Tetsuaki Mita	Takahiro Okura	August 13, 2016
When Conan and his friends hear that a UFO has been spotted near Kometo Bridge, they go to observe it but discover a body and a boomerang. Conan realizes the truth behind the UFO sighting.
830	13	"A Cottage Surrounded By Zombies (Part 1)"; Transliteration: "Zombi ga Kakomu Bessō (Zenpen)" (Japanese: ゾンビが囲む別荘（前編）)	Koichiro Kuroda	N/A	September 3, 2016
When Kogoro, Conan, and Ran go to the cottage where a zombie movie was filmed, they encounter Heiji and Kazuha there. Later, a movie crew arrives to shoot a trailer for the sequel to the zombie movie. While filming, producer Takashi Harawaki goes missing, and the others search for him in the cottage. Conan and Heiji discover Harawaki's body.
831	14	"A Cottage Surrounded By Zombies (Part 2)"; Transliteration: "Zombi ga Kakomu Bessō (Chūhen)" (Japanese: ゾンビが囲む別荘 （中編）)	Hiroshi Akiyama	N/A	September 10, 2016
Conan and his friends discover Harawaki's body at the filming location of a zombie movie. On his smartphone is a video of Harawaki drinking hydrocyanic acid. Because only Harawaki was able to drive and there is no cell phone service at the cottage, they are unable to call the police. That night, the bedridden Kogoro tells Ran and Kazuha that zombies have surrounded the cottage. The girls do not believe him, but then they are attacked.
832	15	"A Cottage Surrounded By Zombies (Part 3)"; Transliteration: "Zombi ga Kakomu Bessō (Kōhen)" (Japanese: ゾンビが囲む別荘（後編）)	Akira Yoshimura	N/A	September 17, 2016
Camerawoman Kyoko Ejiri is found dead. On her smart phone is a video in which a zombified Harawaki bites Kyoko on the neck, and Harawaki's body has disappeared from the other room. Conan and Heiji believe this case and the one from eight years ago may be related. Gunma police Inspector Yamamura begins his own investigation, while Conan and Heiji close in on the truth.
833	16	"The Great Detective's Weakness"; Transliteration: "Meitantei ni Jakuten Ari" (Japanese: 名探偵に弱点あり)	Takanori Yano	Junichi Miyashita	September 24, 2016
Kogoro inadvertently gets caught up in a bank robbery and chases an armed robber onto a building rooftop. Kogoro, who has a fear of heights, enters a state of shock and loses the robber. The police eventually arrest the robber, but the robber tossed the gun while fleeing. Two days later, Taizo Sakaki, a futures trader accused of fraud, is shot in the shoulder and leg by a person riding a motorcycle. The gun used in the incident is the same one thrown away by the robber. Kogoro determines the identity of the individual who picked up the missing gun, but the case is not over yet.
834	17	"The Man Who Died Twice (Part 1)"; Transliteration: "Nido Shinda Otoko (Zenpen)" (Japanese: 二度死んだ男（前編）)	Minoru Tozawa	Nobuo Ogizawa	October 1, 2016
Kogoro and Conan witness secretary Shinkai stabbing moneylender Takarada with a chef's knife. However, Takarada had been murdered two hours earlier. Kogoro believes Shinkai stabbed Takarada without realizing he was already dead. Kogoro had been summoned to the apartment by Takarada to discuss a murder threat he received in the mail. Inspector Megure reasons that one of Takarada's financial victims killed him for revenge, and Shinkai testifies that he stabbed Takarada to prevent said victim from becoming a murderer. Megure also suspects one of Takarada's family members may have committed the crime and questions his wife, Mika, and younger brother, Koji.
835	18	"The Man Who Died Twice (Part 2)"; Transliteration: "Nido Shinda Otoko (Kōhen)" (Japanese: 二度死んだ男（後編）)	Yoko Fukushima	Nobuo Ogizawa	October 8, 2016
Takarada's wife, Mika, has no alibi, and she becomes the prime suspect in the strangling when material evidence is discovered, meaning Koji will inherit Takarada's fortune. Conan suspects Koji set up Mika and questions him, but it becomes clear that Koji has an alibi. Conan goes over the facts again and gradually closes in on the truth.
836	19	"The Unfriendly Girls Band (Part 1)"; Transliteration: "Naka no Warui Gāruzu Bando (Zenpen)" (Japanese: 仲の悪いガールズバンド（前編）)	Nobuharu Kamanaka	N/A	October 15, 2016
Conan, Sonoko, Ran, and two friends decide to go to a recording studio to record some songs. They meet the members of a girl's band, who are arguing about their upcoming performance. The drummer is later found strangled in the studio. Three of her band members are suspected of killing her, but when the police cannot find the string used to kill her, the investigation encounters some trouble.
837	20	"The Unfriendly Girls Band (Part 2)"; Transliteration: "Naka no Warui Gāruzu Bando (Kōhen)" (Japanese: 仲の悪いガールズバンド（後編）)	Koichiro Kuroda	N/A	October 22, 2016
Inspector Megure learns the drummer often fought with other bands and believes someone else may have committed the murder. After listening to the stories of the three surviving band members, Conan checks the video of the band practicing. He realizes why the string-like weapon used to kill the victim has not been found in the studio and determines the identity of the killer and the surprising trick that was used.
838	21	"Mysterious Case in a Hot Air Balloon"; Transliteration: "Funwari Kikyū de Kaijiken" (Japanese: ふんわり気球で怪事件)	Tetsuaki Mita	Toyoto Kogiso	November 5, 2016
The Suzuki Corporation holds a hot balloon competition, and Sonoko, Ran and Conan take part in it. During the race, reigning champion Shingo Mizuguchi's balloon collides with Akihiro Okuda's and begins falling. As the balloon descends, his wife, Arisa Mizuguchi, falls to her death. Because Mizuguchi and Okuda fought before the race, the police suspect Okuda deliberately crashed into Mizuguchi's balloon. Okuda insists it was an accident but based on the condition of Okuda's balloon, Conan determines it was not an accident but a murder.
839	22	"You Can Hear the Tengu's Voice"; Transliteration: "Tengu no Koe ga Kikoeru" (Japanese: 天狗の声が聞こえる)	Takanori Yano	Hiro Masaki	November 12, 2016
While hiking, Kogoro, Conan, and Ran hear the moaning voice of the tengu, a mythical dog-like creature. After staying the night at a guest house at the bottom of the mountain, they decide to visit the tengu's cave, one of the town's historic sites. Inside the cave, Conan discovers a body wearing a tengu mask hanging from the shrine. The body belongs to Mayor Shoji Mayama. Kogoro determines the death is a suicide based on the absence of anyone else in the cave, but Conan feels there's something off about the body and crime scene.
840	23	"The Last Gift"; Transliteration: "Saigo no Okurimono" (Japanese: 最後の贈り物)	Minoru Tozawa	Nobuo Ogizawa	November 19, 2016
Officer worker Junko Hirose is arrested for a murder that took place in Tonkoro City. Junko confesses she was being blackmailed by the victim, Masaru Katsui, and killed him because she could not take it anymore. However, Kogoro saw Junko in Beika City at the time of the murder. Because Tonkoro City and Beika City are an hour's drive apart, Kogoro explains to Inspector Megure that it was impossible for Junko to commit the crime. Her alibi verified, Junko is released. However, a dissatisfied Conan, Kogoro and Ran question Junko's coworker and ex-boyfriend as they close in on the truth.
841	24	"The Rainy Bus Stop"; Transliteration: "Ame no Basusutoppu" (Japanese: 雨のバス停)	Akira Yoshimura	Junichi Iioka Yuki Notsuka	November 26, 2016
While walking home in the rain, Kogoro and Conan come across a car accident with Toshiaki Kikuchi unconscious in the driver's seat. In front of his car is the deceased Naohiro Tsutsumi. Kikuchi is shocked when he comes to and sees Tsutsumi's body, as he was a former coworker. Kikuchi testifies that a man with an umbrella suddenly jumped into the intersection and he could not stop his car in time. Tsutsumi's will is found in his jacket pocket.
842	25	"Turning Point on a Driving Date"; Transliteration: "Doraibu Dēto no Wakaremichi" (Japanese: ドライブデートの別れ道)	Makiko Hayase	Nobuo Ogizawa	December 10, 2016
Six months earlier, Remi Kirisaki hanged herself in her apartment and her neighbor, Kei Nakanishi, blamed herself for being unable to prevent it. Now, Kei has moved and is working at her uncle's resort inn. Kei is showing Kogoro and Conan around the area. Remi used fake names to flee from debt collectors, but Conan finds it strange that she used her real name to rent an apartment just before she died. He notices a few other strange things about the story as well.
843	26	"The Detective Boys in a Grove (Part 1)"; Transliteration: "Tantei-dan wa Yabu no Naka (Zenpen)" (Japanese: 探偵団はヤブの中（前編）)	Koichiro Kuroda	N/A	December 17, 2016
The Detective Boys and Professor Agasa go to a restaurant at the Beika Department Store. In the stairwell, they witness Ujiyasu Hosogoe, the head chef, being stabbed in the stomach by a disgruntled customer. Conan calls Genta, Mitsuhiko and Ayumi to let them know the culprit escaped down a different stairway. Genta, Mitsuhiko, and Ayumi all saw the culprit, but each of their accounts is totally different from the others. Determining the culprit's identity will be rather difficult.
844	27	"The Detective Boys in a Grove (Part 2)"; Transliteration: "Tantei-dan wa Yabu no Naka (Kōhen)" (Japanese: 探偵団はヤブの中（後編）)	Nobuharu Kamanaka	N/A	December 24, 2016
Inspector Megure questions Genta, Ayumi and Mitsuhiko about the culprit, but their testimonies of who they saw are very different. The Detective Boys visit the department store's various floors to determine why they saw different culprits.
845	28	"Conan Cornered in the Darkness (Part 1)"; Transliteration: "Zettai Zetsumei Kurayami no Conan (Zenpen)" (Japanese: 絶体絶命暗闇のコナン（前編）)	Takanori Yano	Junichi Miyashita	January 7, 2017
Conan witnesses a figure breaking open a safe inside a building, but he is attacked by the culprit and imprisoned inside a rectangular box. Meanwhile, Kogoro is hired to find the thief who stole the will of Karabashi Group chairman Gotaro Karabashi. Conan manages to get in touch with the Detective Boys using his badge, but he soon finds himself cornered in a desperate situation.
846	29	"Conan Cornered in the Darkness (Part 2)"; Transliteration: "Zettai Zetsumei Kurayami no Conan (Kōhen)" (Japanese: 絶体絶命暗闇のコナン（後編）)	Minoru Tozawa	Junichi Miyashita	January 14, 2017
Mitsuhiko hears about the case Kogoro has been hired to investigate and deduces that it must be related to the burglary Conan witnessed. Ai and the others realize that Conan is inside Gotaro's coffin, but the hearse is already on its way to the crematorium.
847	30	"Chiba's Difficult UFO Case (Part 1)"; Transliteration: "Chiba no Yūfō Nanjiken (Zenpen)" (Japanese: 千葉のUFO難事件（前編）)	Akira Yoshimura	N/A	January 28, 2017
Detective Chiba is investigating a strange case that took place three months earlier. Magazine editor Kyogo Nakatsu was suffocated to death and pressed face-first into a patch of concrete at Haido High School. The prime suspect is UFO fanatic Yusuke Kuchiki, who testifies that an alien flew down in a UFO and murdered Nakatsu while floating mid-air, and a security camera captured a mysterious shadow.
848	31	"Chiba's Difficult UFO Case (Part 2)"; Transliteration: "Chiba no Yūfō Nanjiken (Kōhen)" (Japanese: 千葉のUFO難事件（後編）)	Koichiro Kuroda	N/A	February 4, 2017
Conan visits Yusuke Kuchiki's house with Detective Chiba and Kogoro to question him. While there, Conan discovers something in the room and realizes the reason behind Kuchiki's strange actions. Later, Conan confirms the appearance of the UFO. Having closed in on the truth, Conan gathers everyone to conduct an experiment.
849	32	"The Marriage Registration's Password (Part 1)"; Transliteration: "Kon'intodoke no Pasuwādo (Zenpen)" (Japanese: 婚姻届のパスワード（前編）)	Tetsuaki Mita	N/A	February 11, 2017
When police Officer Yumi Miyamoto sees a news story about the shogi championship match, she learns for the first time that Haneda is a professional shogi player. Several years earlier, Yumi received an envelope from Haneda and was instructed not to open it until he had acquired "all seven." Haneda has now won all seven major shogi titles. Detective Sato reasons that the envelope's contents must be a marriage registration, but Yumi threw out the magazine she kept the envelope in that morning. They immediately head to the dump site, but the magazine is gone. Conan and the Detective Boys attempt to help Yumi find the envelope.
850	33	"The Marriage Registration's Password (Part 2)"; Transliteration: "Kon'intodoke no Pasuwādo (Kōhen)" (Japanese: 婚姻届のパスワード（後編）)	Nobuharu Kamanaka	N/A	February 18, 2017
Building manager Koroku Hachitsuka hides the envelope containing a marriage registration form Haneda gave to Yumi and locks his computer with an eight-digit password. The location of the envelope will be revealed when the password is entered. Believing the solution may require more than one sheet of paper, Conan and his friends decide to search the room for the other sheet. During their search, Yumi notices the code sheet is a copy and not the original. This clue leads Conan to the solution.
851	34	"The Descent Into Hell Tour of Love (Beppu Chapter)"; Transliteration: "Koi no Jigoku-meguri Tsuā (Beppu-hen)" (Japanese: 恋の地獄めぐりツアー（別府編）)	Takanori Yano	Toshimichi Okawa	March 4, 2017
Kogoro takes Conan and Ran to the Beppu hot springs in Oita Prefecture. Kogoro's true purpose is to find Manami Nakadai, the missing daughter of Nakadai Electric's president. It's highly probable that Manami came to Beppu to see her ex-boyfriend, Hiroyuki Hayami. Kogoro is able to find Manami, but she is then kidnapped. Meanwhile, Detective Miwako Sato and the police are pursuing an armed robber in Oita Prefecture.
852	35	"The Descent Into Hell Tour of Love (Oita Chapter)"; Transliteration: "Koi no Jigoku-meguri Tsuā (Ōita-hen)" (Japanese: 恋の地獄めぐりツアー（大分編）)	Minoru Tozawa	Toshimichi Okawa	March 11, 2017
Manami is kidnapped, and the bag containing the 100 million yen in ransom money is carried away by Ryuji Ogikubo using a drone. Detectives Sato and Takagi are also pursuing Ogikubo as the suspect in an armed robbery. Ogikubo takes Sato hostage and heads for the hot springs, where he plans to meet up with his accomplice and split the ransom money. The detectives arrest Ogikubo, but the 100 million yen inside the bag has disappeared. Conan pursues Manami and Ogikubo's accomplice in order to solve the case.
853	36	"Memories from Sakura Class (Ran GIRL)"; Transliteration: "Sakura-gumi no Omoide (Ran Gāru)" (Japanese: サクラ組の思い出（蘭GIRL）)	Yasuichiro Yamamoto	N/A	March 18, 2017
While Conan walks with Ran, Sonoko and Sera along a cherry blossom-lined road, Ran recalls how she met Kudo Shinichi. Thirteen years ago, Ran was being bullied by some boys in her kindergarten class. She was approached by Shinichi, who had just joined the school. Shinichi suspects something is up when he notices teacher Ronsuke Efune staring at Ran the whole time. Later, he's suspicious when Efune shows favoritism to Ran. Efune explains each of his actions, but Shinichi suspects Efune is plotting something.
854	37	"Memories from Sakura Class (Shinichi BOY)"; Transliteration: "Sakura-gumi no Omoide (Shin'ichi Bōi)" (Japanese: サクラ組の思い出（新一BOY）)	Yasuichiro Yamamoto	N/A	March 25, 2017
Shinichi tells his parents about Ronsuke Efune's suspicious behavior toward Ran. The next day, Efune takes the children to the park far away from the kindergarten. Yusaku Kudo goes to check on the children while dressed in disguise and witnesses the driver of a parked van taking photos of the children. Yusaku learns Efune's wife is staying at the hospital next to the park and begins to unravel Efune's plot.
855	38	"The Mystery of the Vanished Black Belt"; Transliteration: "Kieta Kuroobi no Nazo" (Japanese: 消えた黒帯の謎)	Akira Yoshimura	Takahiro Okura	April 15, 2017
Conan and Sonoko visit a dojo in Osaka to see Sonoko's long-distance boyfriend, Makoto Kyogoku. However, Kyogoku is accused of stealing an important black belt from the dojo's display case.
856	39	"The Socialite Couple's Secret"; Transliteration: "Serebu Fūfu no Himitsu" (Japanese: セレブ夫婦の秘密)	Koichiro Kuroda	Junichi Iioka Yuki Notsuka	April 22, 2017
Kogoro and Conan investigate the deaths of wealthy day trader Seiichi Maehara and his wife, Saki. Inspector Megure deduces that Saki pretended to be a robber and murdered Maehara, but made a mistake while disguising herself as a victim and suffocated herself. However, Conan notices something strange about the crime scene.

== Home media release ==
Shogakukan/Being (Japan, Region 2 DVD)
Volume	Episodes^{Jp.}	Release date	Ref.
Volume 1	818-821	January 26, 2019	
Volume 2	822-825	February 23, 2019	
Volume 3	826-829	March 23, 2019	
Volume 4	830-833	April 27, 2019	
Volume 5	834-837	May 25, 2019	
Volume 6	838-841	June 22, 2019	
Volume 7	842-844, 855	July 27, 2019	
Volume 8	845-848	August 24, 2019	
Volume 9	849-852	September 21, 2019	
Volume 10	853-856, 859	November 23, 2019	
