= The Man Who Died Twice (poem) =

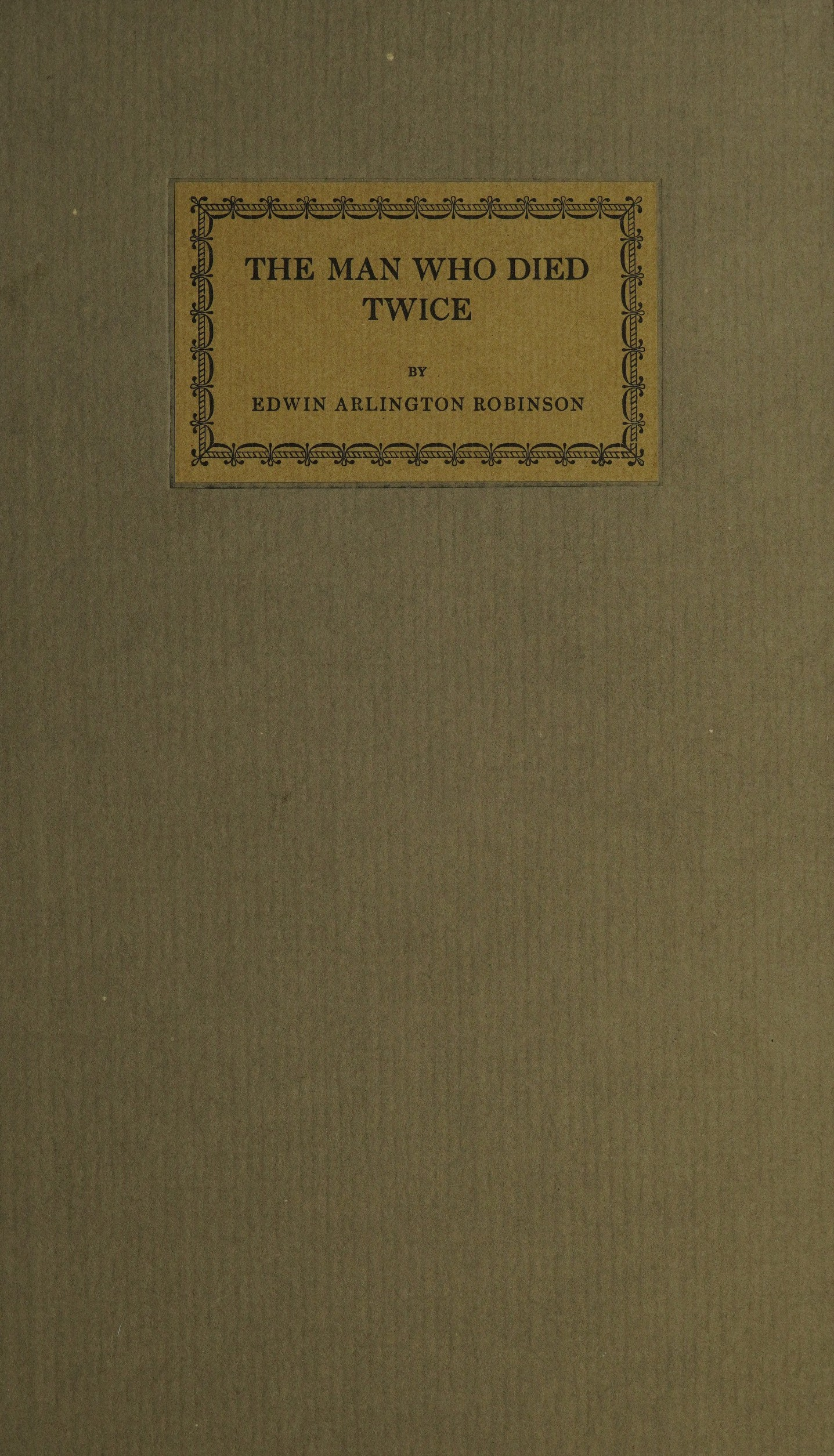
Cover of the 1st edition, published by The Macmillan Company

The Man Who Died Twice is a narrative poem by Edwin Arlington Robinson that was first published in 1924.

The poem is written in blank verse. Its hero is the unfulfilled musician Fernando Nash.

It was awarded the Pulitzer Prize for Poetry in 1925.
