= Merlin (Robinson poem) =

1917 poem by Edwin Arlington Robinson

Merlin is a dramatic narrative poem by Edwin Arlington Robinson, written in 1917.

== Description ==
Edith J. R. Isaac’s critical analysis of “Merlin” reads as follows:

The poem is entirely modern in its spirit and treatment, with lines like these that mark its date:

... Time swings
A mighty scythe, and some day all your peace
Goes down before its edge like so much clover.

In Robinson's poem, King Arthur and his knights are not romantic heroes, as other poets have made them, not "our conception of what knighthood should be"; they are a modern poet's conception of what leaders of men always and universally are – king, warrior, lover, fool; Arthur, Gawaine, Lancelot, Dagonet. Nor is Robinson's Merlin like Tennyson's – a magician in his dotage falling a victim to the wiles of a false woman. He is a prophet whose "memories go forward"; he is a man "Who saw himself, A sight no other man has ever seen," and he follows Vivian, "a woman who is worth a grave," because Fate wills it so. In Merlin, Robinson revivifies, not the age of chivalry, but our own time, our own double world of hope and of reality, with its loves, faith, fears, wars and failures. The philosophy of the poem, that faith and creative love will someday save the world, is a lustrous background for the story: "The torch of woman, who, together with the light That Galahad found, is yet to light the world." As a tale Merlin is vivid and compelling, with scenes, like that of Merlin's first meeting with Vivian and his final parting, which rival the best in drama for beauty and intensity.

== Synopsis ==
Dagonet and Gawaine converse at Merlin’s Rock; among other things, they discuss how Merlin, who has been living in Brocéliande with Vivian, is rumored to have returned to Camelot. Bedivere, Lamorak, and Kay discuss current events in Camelot. Arthur and Merlin have a long discussion, which brings Arthur no peace, and he requests that Dagonet play a song, but Dagonet is too depressed to sing. Merlin returns to Vivian. The poem then flashes backward ten years to the beginning and development of Merlin and Vivian’s relationship up to Dagonet’s arrival to summon Merlin back to court, which narrowly precedes the first scene. It then flashes past the already-related events to those following Merlin’s return from Camelot. His sojourn there, brief though it was, has changed him and leaves a widening gap between him and Vivian. Merlin realizes that he has grown old and leaves again. In Camelot, much has changed: Lancelot’s rescue of Guinevere from being burned as an adulteress entailed slaying many knights, including two of Gawaine’s brothers, which has made the formerly lighthearted Gawaine grow bitter and led him to seek vengeance. Dagonet, Bedivere, and Gawaine discuss current events. Gawaine and Bedivere depart, leaving Dagonet brooding at Merlin’s Rock. Merlin appears and the two have a long, philosophical discussion, then leave Camelot together.
