= Head Tide Historic District =

Historic district in Maine, United States

- U.S. National Register of Historic Places
- U.S. Historic district
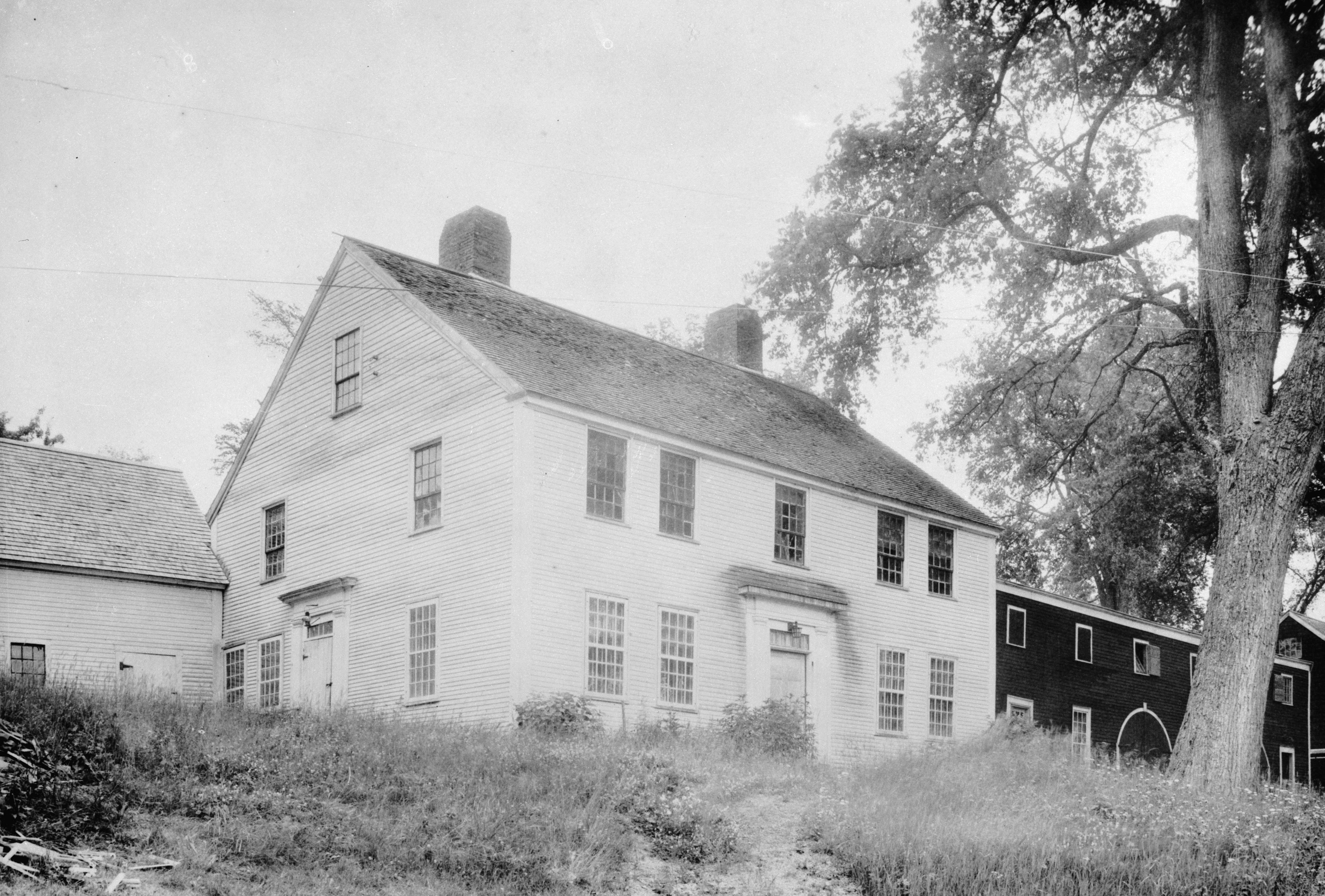
- The Jeremiah Jewett House, c. 1940

- Location within Maine Location within the United States
- Location: Both sides of Sheepscot River, Alna, Maine
- Coordinates: 44°6′53″N 69°37′28″W
- Area: 60 acres (24 ha)
- Built: 1787
- Architectural style: Greek Revival, Federal, Gothic Revival
- NRHP reference No.: 74000320
- Added to NRHP: November 19, 1974

The Head Tide Historic District encompasses a formerly industrial, now rural village at the head of tide of the Sheepscot River in Alna, Maine. The area had been industrially active since the mid-18th century, but its mills declined and were all destroyed by 1949, leaving a predominantly residential area with a number of houses dating mainly to the period before 1860. The district was listed on the National Register of Historic Places in 1974.

== Description and history ==
Head Tide Village is located in northern Alna, and is centered on a stretch of Head Tide Road spanning the Sheepscot River between Maine State Route 218 and Maine State Route 194. The majority of the village's buildings are on the east side of the river, but its major public buildings, the 1838 Head Tide Church and the old schoolhouse, are on the west side. Just east of the bridge stands the former Jewett General Store building (1884). The river banks on both sides are in some places lined with the foundational remnants of the village's industrial past, most below the dam (first built 1760) a short distance upstream from the bridge. There is a house whose property borders the Shepscot built in 1787, known as the Spring House, because the spring that used to supply the community with fresh water exists under the Kitchen in the house. A well in its front yard can still be used to draw water.

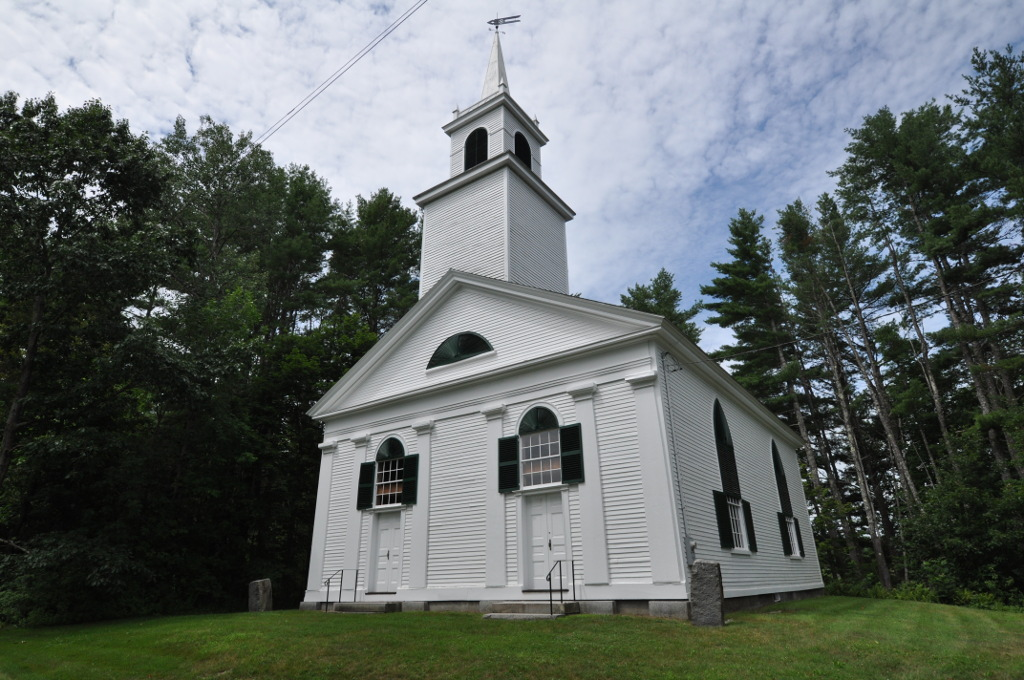
The Head Tide Church

Settlement along the Sheepscot River by colonial settlers began in a significant way only with the end of hostilities with Native Americans in 1760. In that year, Lincoln County was established, and in 1761 Doctor Silvester Gardiner acquired a land grant that included the Head Tide area. One of his early land sales was to David Nelson, who built the first dam. Originally part of Newcastle, the village was substantial enough to be set off in 1794 as New Milford (after the large number of mills at Head Tide), later renamed Alna. In the early 19th century the village had six water wheels powering lumber, grist, and textile processing operations, and the village was the town's economic center.

Advances in technology, and the area's remote location, worked against it in the late 19th century. In 1896 a spring freshet destroyed the mills on one side of the river, and a fire destroyed those on the other side in 1924. Only one mill was rebuilt after these events, and it was torn down in 1949.

== See also ==
- National Register of Historic Places listings in Lincoln County, Maine
