= Edwin Arlington Robinson =

American poet and playwright (1869–1935)

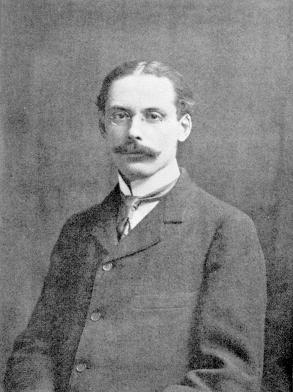
- Born: December 22, 1869; Head Tide, Maine, U.S.
- Died: April 6, 1935 (aged 65); New York City, New York, U.S.
- Education: Harvard University
- Occupations: Poet; playwright
- Partner: Elizabeth Sparhawk-Jones
- Relatives: David S. Nivison (grandnephew)
- Writing career
- Period: 1896–1935
- Notable awards: Pulitzer Prize for Poetry (1922; 1925; 1928)

Edwin Arlington Robinson (December 22, 1869 – April 6, 1935) was an American poet and playwright. Robinson won the Pulitzer Prize for Poetry on three occasions and was nominated for the Nobel Prize in Literature four times.

== Early life ==
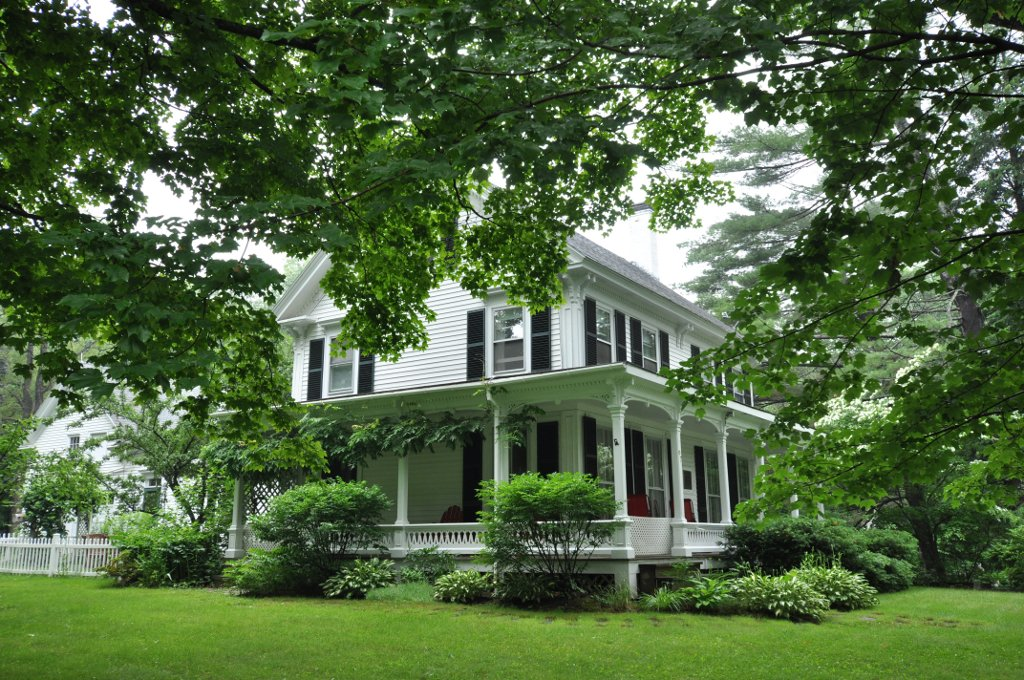
The Edwin Arlington Robinson House in Gardiner, Maine

Robinson was born in Head Tide, Maine, on December 22, 1869. His parents were Edward and Mary (née Palmer). They had wanted a girl, and did not name him until he was six months old, when they visited a holiday resort—at which point other vacationers decided that he should have a name, and selected the name "Edwin" from a hat containing a random set of boy's names. The man who drew the name was from Arlington, Massachusetts, so "Arlington" was used for his middle name. Throughout his life, he hated not only his given name but also his family's habit of calling him "Win". As an adult, he always used the signature "E. A."

Robinson's family moved to Gardiner, Maine, in 1870. He later described his childhood as "stark and unhappy". Robinson first studied at Mrs. Morrell's School in Gardiner and later attended public schools, graduating from Gardiner High School.

Robinson's early struggles led many of his poems to have a dark pessimism and his stories to deal with "an American dream gone awry." His eldest brother, Dean, was a doctor and had become addicted to laudanum while self-medicating for neuralgia. The middle brother, Herman, a handsome and charismatic man, married the woman Edwin loved, Emma Löehen Shepherd. Emma thought highly of Edwin and encouraged his poetry, but he was deemed too young to be in realistic competition for her hand, which didn't keep him from being agitated deeply by witnessing what he considered her being deceived by Herman's charm and choosing shallowness over depth. The marriage was a great blow to Edwin's pride, and during the wedding ceremony, on February 12, 1890, the despondent poet stayed home and wrote a poem of protest, "Cortège", the title of which refers to the train that took the newly married couple out of town to their new life in St. Louis, Missouri. Herman suffered multiple business failures, becoming an alcoholic, and ended up estranged from his wife and children. Herman died impoverished in 1909 of tuberculosis at Boston City Hospital. Robinson's poem Richard Cory was thought by his sister-in-law Emma to refer to her husband.

== Education at Harvard University ==
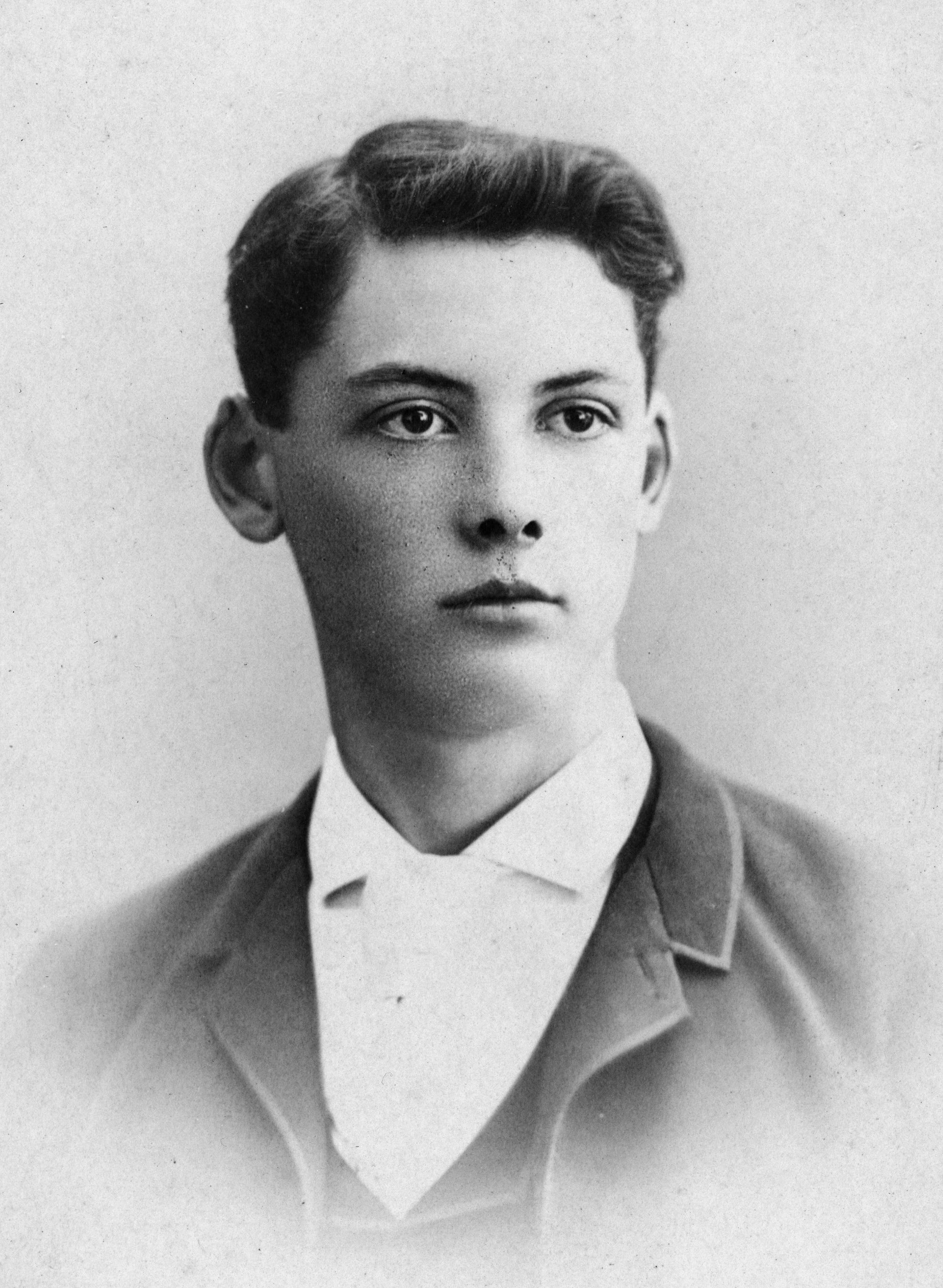
Robinson in 1888; taken when he graduated from Gardiner High School

In 1891, at the age of 21, Robinson entered Harvard University as a special student where he took classes in English, French, and Shakespeare; as well as one on Anglo-Saxon that he later dropped. He did not aim to get all A's; as he wrote his friend Harry Smith, "B, and in that vicinity, is a very comfortable and safe place to hang."

Robinson's real desire was to get published in one of the Harvard literary journals. Within the first fortnight of being there, The Harvard Advocate published Robinson's "Ballade of a Ship." He was even invited to meet with the editors, but when he returned, he complained to his friend Mowry Saben, "I sat there among them, unable to say a word."

Robinson's father died after his first year at Harvard. He returned to Harvard for a second year, but it was to be his last one as a student there. Though short, Robinson's stay in Cambridge included some of his most cherished experiences, and there he made his most lasting friendships. He wrote his friend Harry Smith on June 21, 1893:

I suppose this is the last letter I shall ever write you from Harvard. The thought seems a little queer, but it cannot be otherwise. Sometimes I try to imagine the state my mind would be in had I never come here, but I cannot. I feel that I have got comparatively little from my two years, but still, more than I could get in Gardiner if I lived a century.

By mid-1893, Robinson had returned to Gardiner, where he made plans to start writing seriously. In October he wrote his friend Gledhill:

Writing has been my dream ever since I was old enough to lay a plan for an air castle. Now for the first time I seem to have something like a favorable opportunity and this winter I shall make a beginning.

== Career ==
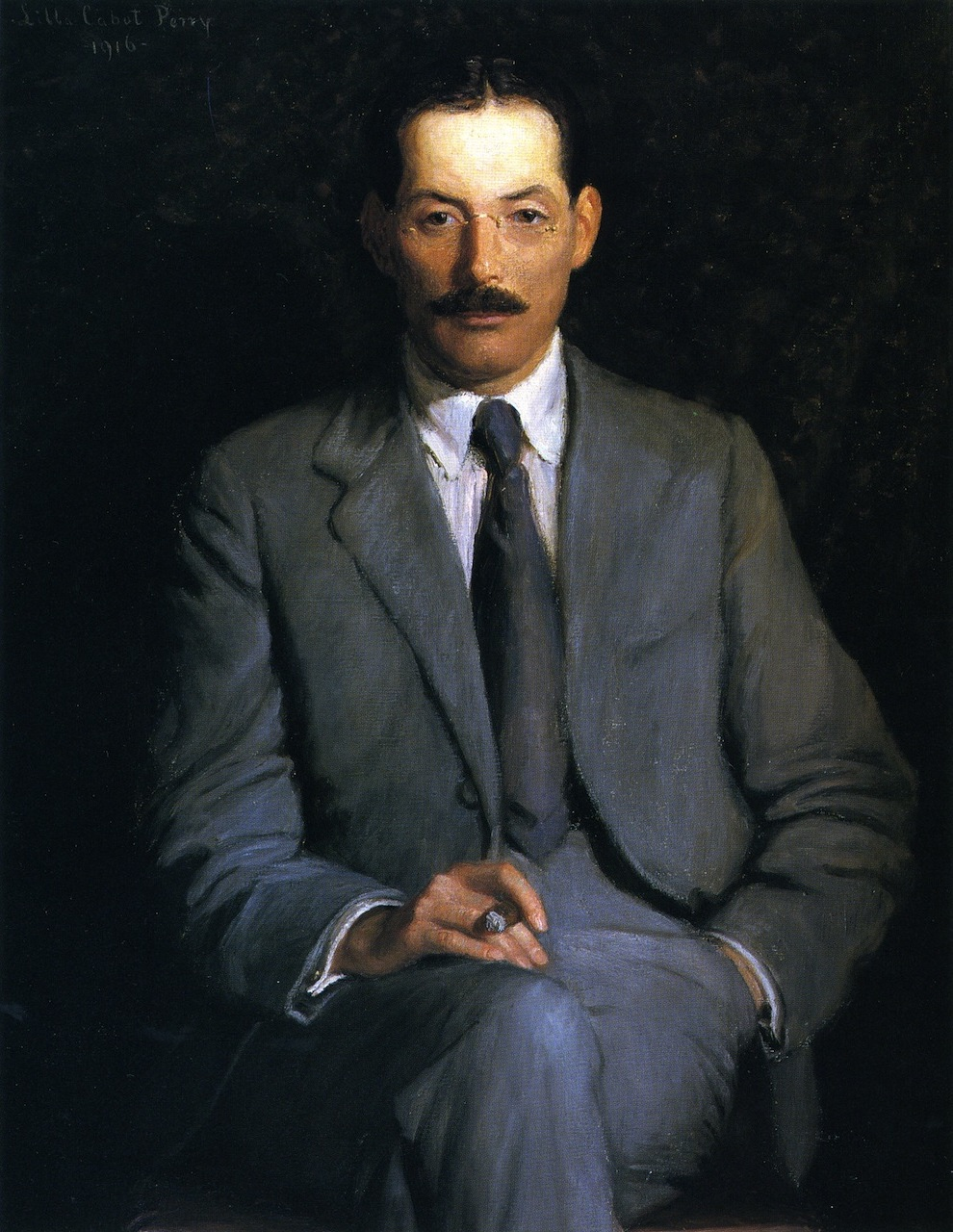
1916 portrait by Lilla Carbot Perry

With his father gone, Robinson became the man of the household. He tried farming and developed a close relationship with his sister-in-law Emma Robinson, who after her husband Herman's death, moved back to Gardiner with her children. She twice rejected marriage proposals from Robinson, after which he permanently left Gardiner. He moved to New York, where he lived as an impoverished poet while cultivating friendships with other writers, artists, and intellectuals. In 1896, he self-published his first book, The Torrent and the Night Before, paying 100 dollars for 500 copies. Robinson meant it as a surprise for his mother. Days before the copies arrived, his mother died of diphtheria. His eldest brother, Dean, died of a drug overdose in 1899.

Robinson's second volume, Children of The Night, published in 1897, had a somewhat wider circulation. Its readers included President Theodore Roosevelt's son Kermit, who had received a copy from his teacher, who happened to be a friend of Robinson. Kermit then recommended it to his father, who, impressed by the poems and aware of Robinson's straits, invited Robinson to join him for dinner at the White House (though Robinson declined due to his lacking "suitable clothes") and in 1905 offered the writer a sinecure at the New York Customs Office. According to Edmund Morris, author of Theodore Rex, a tacit condition of his employment was that, in exchange for his desk and two thousand dollars a year, he should work "with a view to helping American letters", rather than the receipts of the United States Treasury. Robinson remained in the job until Roosevelt left office. In 1913, Robinson lived on Lighthouse Hill, Staten Island.

Gradually his literary successes began to mount. He won the Pulitzer Prize three times in 1922, 1925 and 1928, and was elected a member of the American Academy of Arts and Letters in 1927. He was later described by the poet Michael Schmidt as "more artful than Hardy and more coy than Frost and a brilliant sonneteer".

== Tilbury ==
Tilbury Town is a fictional American town which is the location for many works by Robinson. The small New England village was modeled after Gardiner, Maine, where Robinson grew up. Tilbury Town is the setting of “Richard Cory”, “Mr. Flood’s Party”, and “Luke Havergall”, all of which are included in the Columbia Anthology of the 500 most anthologized poems in the English language. Most of Robinson's non-Arthurian characters only appear in one poem; however, four residents of Tilbury Town—Calverly, Clavering, Leffingwell, and Lingard—are mentioned in at least three poems each.

== Personal life ==
Robinson never married. During his period of studying at Harvard, he was described by his friend Mowry Saben as someone attracted to both men and women, but too repressed "to indulge himself in either direction". During the last 20 years of his life he became a regular summer resident at the MacDowell Colony in New Hampshire, where several women made him the object of their devoted attention. Robinson and artist Elizabeth Sparhawk-Jones visited MacDowell at the same times over a cumulative total of ten years. They had a romantic relationship in which she was in love with him, devoted to him and understood him, and was relaxed in her approach with him; he called her Sparhawk and was courteous towards her. They had a relationship that the poet D. H. Tracy described as "courtly, quiet, and intense". She described him as a charming, sensitive, and emotionally grounded man with high moral values.

== Death and legacy ==
Robinson died of cancer on April 6, 1935, in the New York Hospital (now the Weill Cornell Medical Center) in New York City; he was buried at Oak Grove Cemetery in Gardiner, Maine. When Robinson died, Sparhawk-Jones attended his vigil and later painted several works in his memory. The same month, a memorial ceremony was held at Gardiner High School, Robinson's old school. In October of the same year, a monument was erected in Gardiner Common through the efforts of Robinson's friend and mentor Laura E. Richards, who raised the money for the monument from across the country; the Boston architect Henry R. Shepley provided the design, Richards wrote the inscription and Robinson's biographer, Herman Hagedorn, was the keynote speaker.

Robinson's childhood home in Gardiner was designated a National Historic Landmark in 1971. Robinson's grandnephew David S. Nivison, a noted expert on Chinese philosophy and Chinese history, was a trustee of Robinson's estate.

== Selected works ==
=== Poetry ===
- The Torrent; and The Night Before (1896), including "Luke Havergal"
- Children of The Night (1897), including "Kosmos" (1895) and "Richard Cory"
- Captain Craig and Other Poems (1902)
- The Town Down the River (1910), including "Miniver Cheevy"
- The Man Against the Sky (1916)
- Merlin (1917)
- The Three Taverns (1920)
- Lancelot (1920)
- Avon's Harvest (1921), including "Ben Trovato"
- Collected Poems (1921), Pulitzer Prize winner
- Roman Bartholow (1923)
- The Man Who Died Twice (1924), Pulitzer Prize winner
- Dionysus in Doubt (1925), including "Haunted House" and "Karma"
- Tristram (1927), Pulitzer Prize winner
- Fortunatus (1928)
- Sonnets, 1889–1917 (1928)
- Cavender's House (1929)
- Collected Poems (1929)
- Modred (1929)
- The Glory of the Nightingales (1930)
- Matthias at the Door (1931)
- Selected Poems (1931)
- Nicodemus: A Book of Poems (1932)
- Talifer (1933)
- Amaranth (1934)
- King Jasper (1935)
- A Happy Man

=== Plays ===
- Van Zorn (1914)
- The Porcupine (1915)

=== Letters ===
- Selected Letters (1940)
- Untriangulated Stars: Letters to Harry de Forest Smith 1890–1905 (1947)
- Edwin Arlington Robinson's Letters to Edith Brower (1968)

=== Miscellany ===
- Uncollected Poems and Prose (1975)

== Bibliography ==
- Van Doren, Mark (2010). Edwin Arlington Robinson (Reprint ed.). Kessinger Publishing. ISBN 978-1-169-10983-4.
