= Richard Cory =

Poem by Edwin Arlington Robinson

Richard Cory

Whenever Richard Cory went down town,
We people on the pavement looked at him:
He was a gentleman from sole to crown,
Clean favored, and imperially slim.

And he was always quietly arrayed,
And he was always human when he talked;
But still he fluttered pulses when he said,
"Good-morning," and he glittered when he walked.

And he was rich – yes, richer than a king –
And admirably schooled in every grace:
In fine, we thought that he was everything
To make us wish that we were in his place.

So on we worked, and waited for the light,
And went without the meat, and cursed the bread;
And Richard Cory, one calm summer night,
Went home and put a bullet through his head.

"Richard Cory" is a narrative poem written by Edwin Arlington Robinson. It was first published in 1897, as part of The Children of the Night, having been completed in July of that year; and it remains one of Robinson's most popular and anthologized poems. The poem describes a man whose wealth and civility make him the envy of those acquainted with him; despite this, he ends up committing suicide.

The song "Richard Cory", written by Paul Simon and recorded by Simon & Garfunkel for their second studio album, Sounds of Silence, was based on this poem.

== Context ==
The composition of the poem occurred while the United States economy was still suffering from the severe depression of the Panic of 1893, during which people often subsisted on day-old bread, alluded to in the poem's focus on poverty and wealth, and foodstuffs.

Robinson wrote "Richard Cory" around the same time as "Reuben Bright". David Perkins, in his A History of Modern Poetry (first published 1976), called some of those early poems including "Reuben Bright" and "Richard Cory" "revolutionary", with narrative elements of prose fiction brought into a lyric poetry written about realistic subject matter in vernacular language.

== Adaptations ==
=== As music ===
The American composer Charles Naginski wrote the music to "Richard Cory", published 1940, included in Thomas Hampson's Album "I hear America singing" from 2001.

The poem was adapted by the folk duo Simon & Garfunkel for their song "Richard Cory". The Simon & Garfunkel version of the song's ending differs from the poem in that the speaker still wishes he "could be Richard Cory", even after Cory has killed himself.

Them (with Van Morrison) released their version of Simon's song as a single in 1966, which failed to make the charts.

American Utah-based Folk band The 3 D’s included a musical interpretation of the poem as the 8th track on their 1964 album “New Dimensions in Folk Songs”, a collection of poems set to original music.

Paul McCartney and Wings performed the Simon & Garfunkel adaptation on their album Wings over America.

The punk band The Menzingers wrote a song titled "Richard Corry" which was inspired by the poem. The difference in spelling from Cory to Corry is because the band has a personal friend whose last name is Corry.

The American composer John Woods Duke wrote Three Poems by Edwin Arlington Robinson, which includes the full text of the poem "Richard Cory".

Martini Ranch recorded a song based on the poem on their album Holy Cow.

Melbourne band Tiny Little Houses released a song titled "Richard Cory" based on the poem, in October 2020.

=== Other ===
A. R. Gurney wrote a play based on the poem, also titled Richard Cory. The play, which is presented with a nonlinear timeline, suggests the reasons Cory killed himself, including family problems and changing views on humanity. Ed Dixon wrote a musical adaptation of the Gurney play.

American humorist Garrison Keillor wrote a variation of the poem for the Introduction to his The Book of Guys (1993), which suggested that Cory's wife was the reason he killed himself.

The character Ben Nicholson, played by Paul Lambert misquotes the poem in the episode "The Case of the Envious Editor" of the CBS television series Perry Mason (1957–66) starring Raymond Burr.

Author George Flynn also directly references the original poem (and Simon and Garfunkel version) prominently in his novel Richard Cory Revisited as a thematic device.

Author David Foster Wallace wrote a short story titled Good Old Neon which both directly alludes to Richard Cory in its text and mirrors the plot of the poem.
