= The Divergent Series =

American film series

- Official film series logo
- Based on: Divergent series by Veronica Roth
- Produced by: Lucy Fisher; Douglas Wick; Pouya Shabazian
- Starring: Shailene Woodley; Theo James; Zoë Kravitz; Miles Teller; Ansel Elgort; Edward Perry; Maggie Q
- Production companies: Red Wagon Entertainment; Summit Entertainment
- Distributed by: Summit Entertainment; Lionsgate
- Release dates: March 21, 2014 (Divergent); March 20, 2015 (Insurgent); March 18, 2016 (Allegiant)
- Running time: 379 minutes (3 films)
- Country: United States
- Language: English
- Budget: $305 million (3 films)
- Box office: $765 million (3 films)

The Divergent Series is an American dystopian film series based on the Divergent novels by the American author Veronica Roth. Distributed by Summit Entertainment and Lionsgate Films, the series consists of three films set in a dystopian society: Divergent, Insurgent, and Allegiant. They have been produced by Lucy Fisher, Pouya Shabazian, and Douglas Wick.

The series stars Shailene Woodley and Theo James as lead characters Beatrice Prior (Tris) and Tobias Eaton (Four), respectively. The supporting cast includes Ansel Elgort, Zoë Kravitz, Maggie Q, and Miles Teller. Kate Winslet played the main antagonist in the first two films. The first film in the series was directed by Neil Burger, while the second and third films were directed by Robert Schwentke.

The Veronica Roth novels consist primarily of the trilogy of Divergent, Insurgent, and Allegiant. Development began in 2011 following Summit's acquisition of the film rights to the Divergent novel in partnership with production company Red Wagon Entertainment. The studios announced production on the sequel following the first film's strong performance in Thursday late-night screenings, where it grossed $4.9 million. They acquired film rights to the Allegiant novel in December 2013, deciding in April 2014 to split the third novel into a two-part film adaptation.

The first film, Divergent (2014), grossed $289 million worldwide, the second Insurgent (2015), grossed $297 million worldwide. Insurgent was also the first Divergent film to be released in IMAX 3D. The third installment, Allegiant (2016), grossed $179 million. The first three films of the series grossed a total of $765 million worldwide.

A fourth film, Ascendant, based on the latter half of the Allegiant novel, was initially planned for theatrical release but was redeveloped as a TV movie and a spinoff series before getting ultimately cancelled.

== Films ==
| Film | U.S. release date | Director | Screenwriter(s) | Producers |
|---|---|---|---|---|
| Divergent | March 21, 2014 | Neil Burger | Evan Daugherty & Vanessa Taylor | Douglas Wick, Lucy Fisher and Pouya Shahbazian |
| The Divergent Series: Insurgent | March 20, 2015 | Robert Schwentke | Brian Duffield and Akiva Goldsman and Mark Bomback | Douglas Wick, Lucy Fisher and Pouya Shahbazian |
| The Divergent Series: Allegiant | March 18, 2016 | Robert Schwentke | Noah Oppenheim and Adam Cooper & Bill Collage | Douglas Wick, Lucy Fisher and Pouya Shahbazian |

=== Divergent (2014) ===
In a world in which people are divided into distinct factions based on human virtues, Tris Prior is warned that she is Divergent and will never fit into any of the groups. When she discovers a conspiracy by a faction leader to destroy all Divergents, Tris must learn to trust the mysterious Four, and they must find out what makes being Divergent so dangerous before it is too late.

=== The Divergent Series: Insurgent (2015) ===
As they search for allies and answers in the wake of the uprising, Tris and Four are on the run. Hunted by Jeanine Matthews, the leader of the Erudite faction, Tris and Four race against time as they try to figure out what Abnegation sacrificed their lives to protect and the reason why the Erudite leaders will do anything to stop them. Haunted by her past choices but desperate to protect the people she loves, Tris faces one impossible challenge after another as she unlocks the truth about the past and, ultimately, the future of her world.

=== The Divergent Series: Allegiant (2016) ===
On December 16, 2013, Summit Entertainment announced that the film adaptation of Allegiant would be released on March 18, 2016. On April 11, 2014, Lionsgate announced that the film adaptation would be split into two films with the first part titled, The Divergent Series: Allegiant – Part 1. The film was then retitled as The Divergent Series: Allegiant, with the future Part 2 to be named as The Divergent Series: Ascendant, though the critical and box office disappointment of Allegiant would eventually lead to the cancellation of plans for Ascendant.

Tris must escape with Four and go beyond the wall enclosing Chicago. For the first time ever, they will leave the only city and family that they have ever known to find a peaceful solution for their embroiled city. Once outside, old discoveries are quickly rendered meaningless with the revelation of shocking new truths. Tris must quickly decide whom to trust as a ruthless battle ignites beyond the walls of Chicago. To survive, Tris is forced to solve dilemmas on courage, allegiance, sacrifice and love.

== Development ==
In March 2011, Summit Entertainment picked up the rights for Divergent with Douglas Wick and Lucy Fisher's production company Red Wagon Entertainment, while Lionsgate distributes the franchise. Neil Burger was announced as the director on August 23, 2012. Evan Daugherty, who co-wrote the screenplay with Vanessa Taylor, said, "I get hung up on the toughness of the movie but of equal importance is the love story between Tris and Four. It's inherently and inextricably linked to Tris' character journey. There will be plenty of sexual tension and chemistry, but it's important that all of that stuff doesn't just feel like it's thrown in, but that it all helps Tris grow as a character."

Daugherty further added, "It's tricky because the book is a very packed read with a lot of big ideas. So, distilling that into a cool, faithful two-hour movie is challenging. Not only do you have to establish five factions, but you have to acknowledge that there's a sixth entity, which is the divergent, and you also have the factionless. So there's a world that really has to be built out for the big screen... the movie is going to do it a little more efficiently." Author Veronica Roth said about script of the film, "Reading a script is a really interesting experience. I'd never read a script before. I was really impressed by how closely it stuck to the general plotline of the book."

Initially, the budget of the film was $40 million but later Lionsgate increased it to $80 million (which finally changed to $85 million) due to the success of The Hunger Games. Analyst Ben Mogil said, "Divergent is more similar to Hunger Games in that the company owns the underlying economics (i.e. production) and the budget (at $80[million]) is more manageable."

In December 2013, Summit Entertainment announced that a film adaptation of Insurgent, the second novel in the Divergent trilogy, would be released as The Divergent Series: Insurgent on March 20, 2015, as a sequel to the film adaptation of Divergent with Brian Duffield originally chosen to write the script for the film. On December 16, 2013, it was announced that Neil Burger, director of Divergent, would not return to direct Insurgent as he was still working on the first film. On February 13, 2014, it was announced that Robert Schwentke was offered the director position for the film, and Akiva Goldsman hired to re-write Duffield's script.

Also in December 2013, Summit Entertainment announced that the film adaptation of Allegiant, the third and final novel in the Divergent trilogy, would be released in March 2016, serving as the finale of the series, which at the time was planned as a trilogy, but on April 11, 2014, the studio decided to split the novel into a two-part film, much the like the Harry Potter, Twilight, and Hunger Games franchises did with the finales of their series. Lionsgate Motion Picture Group co-chairmen Rob Friedman and Patrick Wachsberger said in a statement that, "Veronica Roth brings her captivating story to a masterful conclusion in 'Allegiant,' a rich, action-packed book with material that is ideally suited to two strong and fulfilling movies. The storytelling arc and world of the characters lend themselves perfectly to two films, a storytelling strategy that has worked very well for us on the two Twilight Breaking Dawn films and about which we're tremendously enthusiastic for the two upcoming Mockingjay films of The Hunger Games franchise". Noah Oppenheim was announced as the screenwriter for the first part of the Allegiant adaptation on July 9, 2014. On December 5, 2014, it was announced that Robert Schwentke will return to direct Part 1. On September 10, 2015, it was announced that the two films would be re-titled, with Part 1 being renamed as The Divergent Series: Allegiant and Part 2 as The Divergent Series: Ascendant.

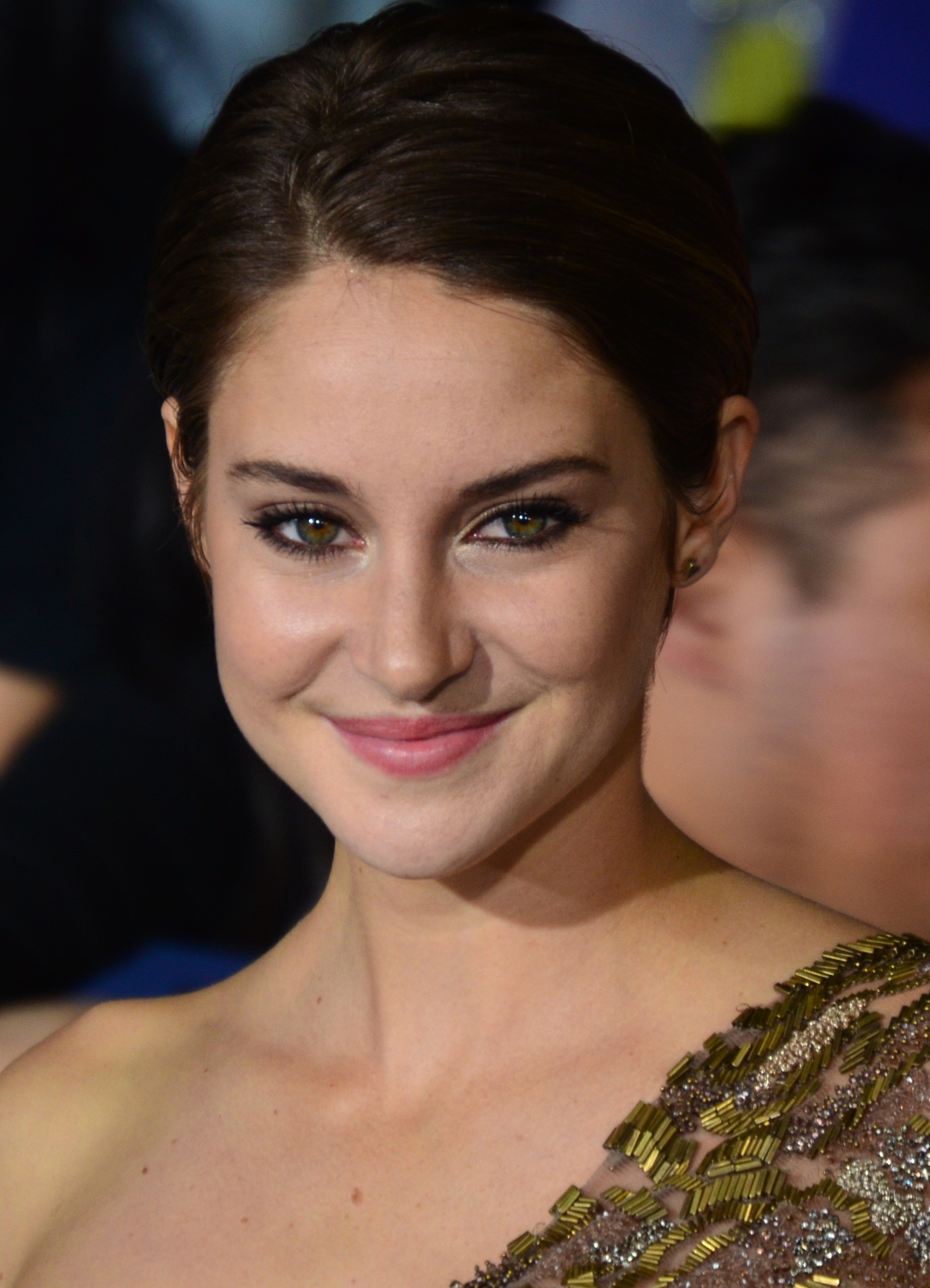
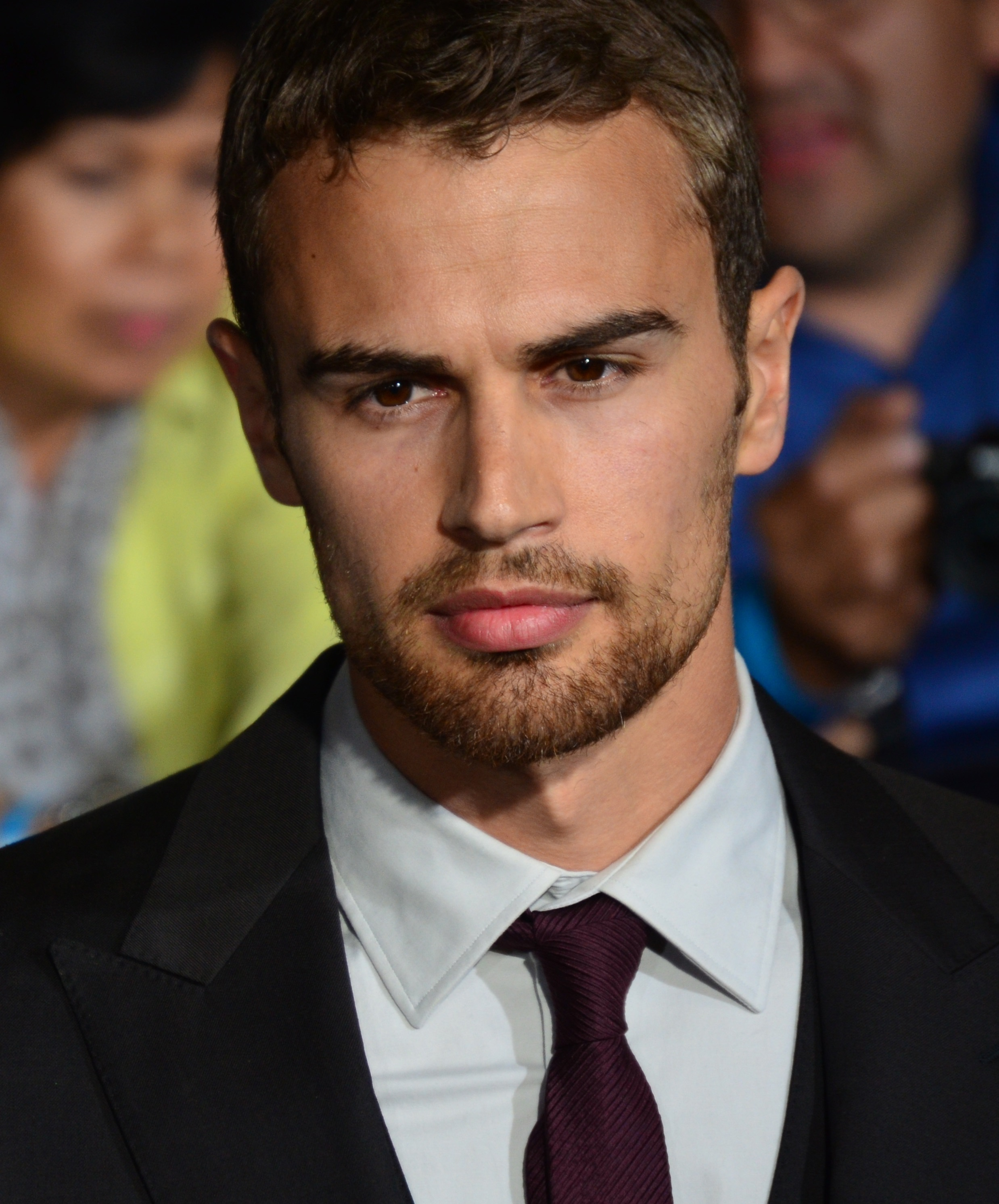
Shailene Woodley (left) and Theo James (right) at the Divergent Los Angeles premiere, March 18, 2014.

=== Casting the main roles ===
On October 22, 2012, it was announced that Shailene Woodley had landed the lead role of Beatrice "Tris" Prior. Lucas Till, Jack Reynor, Jeremy Irvine, Alex Pettyfer, Brenton Thwaites, Alexander Ludwig and Luke Bracey were all considered for the role of Tobias "Four" Eaton. On March 15, 2013, it was announced that Theo James had been cast as Four.

Though James was 10 years older than the character when cast, Roth praised his casting "I was sure within seconds: this was 'Four', no question. Theo is able to capture 'Four's' authority and strength, as well as his depth and sensitivity." She also mentions the chemistry between him and Shailene: "He is a perfect match for Shailene's incredibly strong presence as Tris. I'm thrilled!" The producers said about his casting: "We took our time to find the right actor to fill the role of Four, and Theo is definitely the perfect fit. Veronica has crafted a truly iconic character in Four and we cannot wait to begin production and bring him and this story to life for millions of fans around the world."

== Production ==
Filming for the franchise began on April 16, 2013. Lucy Fisher, Douglas Wick, and Pouya Shabazian have been producers for all films in the series. Veronica Roth and Neil Burger have acted as executive producers on the first two films. Summit Entertainment and Lionsgate collaborated on all three films. On April 11, 2014, the studio decided to split the final book, Allegiant, into two parts, much like Harry Potter and the Deathly Hallows – Parts 1 and 2, The Twilight Saga: Breaking Dawn – Parts 1 and 2, and The Hunger Games: Mockingjay – Parts 1 and 2.

=== Directors ===
Neil Burger directed the first film, Divergent, and was originally going to direct the sequel, The Divergent Series: Insurgent, but in December 2013 it was announced that Burger would not return, due to him still working on post-production work for the first film. Speaking on the subject the director stated, "There was no breathing room. They were like, 'We're holding to a March 2015 release date, and we have to start no later than May 2014.' It was a recipe for failure, at least with me on board. I wouldn't be able to do either thing right. I reluctantly let it go". In February 2014, it was confirmed that Robert Schwentke would direct the sequel instead. On December 5, 2014, it was announced that Schwentke would return for The Divergent Series: Allegiant.

=== Scripts ===
Snow White and the Huntsman screenwriter Evan Daugherty and Hope Springs screenwriter Vanessa Taylor co-wrote the screenplay for Divergent. During the time that Neil Burger was originally going to direct the sequel, Brian Duffield was recruited to write the screenplay for The Divergent Series: Insurgent, but after Burger dropped out of the film and Robert Schwentke took over as director, he brought in Akiva Goldsman and Mark Bomback to rewrite Duffield's script.

The two-part finale screenplay, The Divergent Series: Allegiant and Ascendant, was written by Noah Oppenheim, Adam Cooper, Bill Collage, and Stephen Chbosky.

=== Cast ===
On March 11, 2013, it was announced that the roles of Tori, Christina, and Caleb had gone to Maggie Q, Zoë Kravitz, and Ansel Elgort, respectively. Ray Stevenson, Jai Courtney and Aaron Eckhart were announced to be in talks to join the cast on March 15, 2013, Stevenson and Courtney joined the cast as Marcus Eaton and Eric, respectively. That same day, Miles Teller was cast as Peter. The studio's announcement included a bit of casting news: Mekhi Phifer will play Dauntless leader Max. Kate Winslet was announced to be in talks on January 24, 2013. Later it was confirmed that she would portray Jeanine Matthews.

Talking about playing the negative character for the first time, Winslet said, "I'm no idiot. The idea went through my head that I have never played a baddie before, I was almost kind of surprised." Since Winslet joined the filming late, she used that distance from her co-stars to appear aloof on the first day of her shoot. "I wanted to break it and say, 'It's OK, I'm really fun. I promise.' But I thought, just for today, I'd let them think that I am a complete bitch." On March 25, 2013, Ben Lamb was cast as Edward, Ben Lloyd-Hughes as Will, and Christian Madsen as Al. In April 2013, Ashley Judd and Tony Goldwyn joined the cast as Natalie and Andrew Prior, Beatrice's parents.

In 2014, the cast for the second film was announced. On May 12, 2014, it was announced that Octavia Spencer joined the cast as Amity representative Johanna Reyes. Late May 2014, Suki Waterhouse and Jonny Weston were cast as Marlene and Edgar respectively. Early June 2014, Stephanie Leigh Schlund announced that she was cast in the film as a member of the Amity, and Naomi Watts and Daniel Dae Kim joined the cast as Evelyn Johnson and Jack Kang. On June 9, 2014, Rosa Salazar joined the cast as Lynn. On June 10, 2014, Australian actor Keiynan Lonsdale joined the cast as Uriah. On June 11, 2014, Emjay Anthony joined the cast as Hector.

On April 28, 2015, it was reported that Golden Globe nominee Jeff Daniels joined the cast for Allegiant as David, the leader of the Bureau of Genetic Welfare. On May 1, 2015, it was announced that Bill Skarsgård had joined the cast as Matthew.

=== Filming ===
Principal photography of Divergent began on April 16, 2013, and concluded on July 16, 2013. Almost all of the filming took place in Chicago with reshoots taking place from January 24–26, 2014, in Los Angeles.

Principal photography for The Divergent Series: Insurgent began on May 27, 2014, in Atlanta, Georgia, and concluded on September 6, 2014. Filming took place at United States Penitentiary, Atlanta. A set was constructed for the Amity Compound at Serenbe Community South of Atlanta. In downtown Atlanta, a zip-line scene was filmed for which a set was constructed on the roof of Peachtree Center. For two days, production was moved to Chicago with scenes being filmed in Wells Street, Franklin Street, and Adams Street. Production was then moved back to Atlanta for reshoots.

Principal photography for The Divergent Series: Allegiant began in Atlanta on May 18, 2015, with filming concluding on August 23, 2015.

=== Music ===
Junkie XL scored the first film in the film series, Divergent, while Joseph Trapanese scored the second and third entries, Insurgent and Allegiant.

== Main cast and characters ==
| Character | Film | | |
| Character | Divergent | The Divergent Series: Insurgent | The Divergent Series: Allegiant |
|---|---|---|---|
| Beatrice "Tris" Prior | Shailene Woodley Elyse Cole^{Y} | Shailene Woodley | Shailene Woodley |
| Tobias "Four" Eaton | Theo James | Theo James | Theo James |
| Christina | Zoë Kravitz | Zoë Kravitz | Zoë Kravitz |
| Peter Hayes | Miles Teller | Miles Teller | Miles Teller |
| Caleb Prior | Ansel Elgort | Ansel Elgort | Ansel Elgort |
| Marcus Eaton | Ray Stevenson | Ray Stevenson | Ray Stevenson |
| Tori Wu | Maggie Q | Maggie Q | Maggie Q |
| Jeanine Matthews | Kate Winslet | Kate Winslet | |
| Natalie Prior | Ashley Judd | Ashley Judd | Ashley Judd |
| Eric Coulter | Jai Courtney | Jai Courtney | |
| Max | Mekhi Phifer | Mekhi Phifer | Mekhi Phifer |
| Will | Ben Lloyd-Hughes | Ben Lloyd-Hughes | |
| Andrew Prior | Tony Goldwyn | Tony Goldwyn | |
| Lauren | Justine Wachsberger | Justine Wachsberger | |
| Al | Christian Madsen | | |
| Molly Atwood | Amy Newbold | | |
| Edward | Ben Lamb | | |
| Evelyn Johnson-Eaton | | Naomi Watts | Naomi Watts |
| Johanna Reyes | | Octavia Spencer | Octavia Spencer |
| Uriah Pedrad | | Keiynan Lonsdale | Keiynan Lonsdale |
| Edgar | | Jonny Weston | Jonny Weston |
| Jack Kang | | Daniel Dae Kim | Daniel Dae Kim |
| Marlene | | Suki Waterhouse | |
| Lynn | | Rosa Salazar | |
| Hector | | Emjay Anthony | |
| Edith Prior | | Janet McTeer | |
| David | | | Jeff Daniels |
| Matthew | | | Bill Skarsgård |

== Additional crew and production details ==
| Title | Crew/Detail | | | | | |
| Title | Composer | Cinematographer | Editor(s) | Production companies | Distributing companies | Running time |
|---|---|---|---|---|---|---|
| Divergent | Junkie XL | Alwin H. Küchler | Nancy Richardson; Richard Francis-Bruce | Lionsgate Films; Summit Entertainment; Red Wagon Entertainment | Lionsgate | 139 minutes |
| The Divergent Series: Insurgent | Joseph Trapanese | Florian Ballhaus | Stuart Levy; Nancy Richardson | Lionsgate Films; Mandeville Films; Summit Entertainment; Red Wagon Entertainment | Lionsgate | 119 minutes |
| The Divergent Series: Allegiant | Joseph Trapanese | Florian Ballhaus | Stuart Levy | Lionsgate Films; Mandeville Films; Summit Entertainment; Red Wagon Entertainment | Lionsgate | 121 minutes |

== Reception ==
Though the first two films were commercially successful, the series as a whole has not been well received by critics. Each successive film release has been rated lower than the previous release on review aggregator websites. Negative reviews of the third novel Allegiant and the studios' decision to split it into two films have been blamed for the third film's lackluster performance at the box office.

=== Box office performance ===
| Film | U.S. release date | Box office gross | | | All-time ranking | | Budget | Ref. |
| Film | U.S. release date | U.S. and Canada | Other territories | Worldwide | U.S. and Canada | Worldwide | Budget | Ref. |
|---|---|---|---|---|---|---|---|---|
| Divergent | March 21, 2014 | $150,947,895 | $137,937,923 | $288,885,818 | 283 | 375 | $85 million | |
| The Divergent Series: Insurgent | March 20, 2015 | $130,179,072 | $167,097,257 | $297,276,329 | 392 | 372 | $110 million | |
| The Divergent Series: Allegiant | March 18, 2016 | $66,184,051 | $113,062,817 | $179,246,868 | 1,088 | 1,000+ | $110-142 million | |
| Total | | $347,311,018 | $418,097,997 | $765,409,015 | | | $305 million | |

=== Critical and public response ===
| Film | Rotten Tomatoes | Metacritic | CinemaScore |
|---|---|---|---|
| Divergent | 42% (237 reviews) | 48 (38 reviews) | A |
| The Divergent Series: Insurgent | 28% (208 reviews) | 42 (40 reviews) | A− |
| The Divergent Series: Allegiant | 11% (199 reviews) | 33 (33 reviews) | B |

== Cancelled projects ==
=== Cancelled fourth film ===
A fourth film was initially planned, with a March 2017 release, based on the latter half of the Allegiant book. The timing was changed to a June 2017 release, with Lee Toland Krieger then attached as the director. The film was subsequently cancelled, following the third film's poor box office run.

=== Cancelled television series ===
In July 2016, after the poor performance of the third film at the box office, the producers considered creating the fourth as a television film, which would add new characters to the story and possibly continue in a spinoff television series that would move beyond the books.

In September 2016, Shailene Woodley stated on Today that the decision of film or television had not been finalized and that it was "a limbo waiting game." In the same interview, Woodley spoke despairingly of the chances of her returning to the project in a television format, but she noted that she would be open to returning to it as a theatrical film. In February 2017, with the producers having confirmed that it would be a television project, Woodley was announced to have backed out of her starring role.

In August 2017, Starz and Lionsgate Television announced that they were beginning to develop the television series with the director Lee Toland Krieger and The Legend of Tarzan writer Adam Cozad remaining attached from the original project. In December 2018, Starz announced that it no longer sought to develop a television series and cited the lack of interest of the cast and the network executives, effectively ending the series on a cliffhanger.
