= Producers Guild of America =

Trade association in the United States

- Abbreviation: PGA
- Founded: May 16, 1950; 76 years ago
- Merger of: Screen Producers Guild; Television Producers Guild
- Type: Film trade association
- Tax ID no.: 95-1628346
- Legal status: 501(c)(6)
- Purpose: To represent, protect, and promote the interests of producers and the producing team in film, television, and emerging media.
- Headquarters: Los Angeles, California
- Coordinates: 34°02′21″N 118°26′20″W
- Presidents: Donald De Line, Stephanie Allain
- Chief Executive Officer: Susan Sprung
- Main organ: National Board of Directors
- Affiliations: Producers Guild of America Foundation _{(501(c)(3))}
- Revenue: $5,151,722 (2018)
- Expenses: $4,563,203 (2018)
- Employees: 42 (2017)
- Volunteers: 400 (2017)
- Website: www.producersguild.org

The Producers Guild of America (PGA) is a 501(c)(6) trade association representing the interests of television producers, film producers and emerging media producers in the United States. The PGA's membership includes over 8,400 members of the producing establishment worldwide.

The Producers Guild of America offers several benefits to its members, including seminars and mentoring programs, and entrance to special screenings of movies during Oscar season.

The PGA traces its roots back to the merger of the Screen Producers Guild and the Television Producers Guild in 1962, under Walter Mirisch's leadership. The organization's Golden Laurel Awards, later renamed the Producers Guild of America Awards, began in 1990 and became significant predictors of Oscar success.

Over time, the PGA expanded its influence, establishing councils for various production branches, regional chapters like PGA East in New York, and addressing emerging media with the New Media Council in 2002. In 2012, the organization introduced a certification mark allowing producers to signify their significant contributions to a production.

== History ==
The Producers Guild of America began as two separate organizations, with the Screen Producers Guild being formed on May 16, 1950. Its first president was William Perlberg. In 1957, television producers followed suit, forming the Television Producers Guild, with Ben Brady as its first president. These merged in 1962 to form the PGA under producer Walter Mirisch. Subsequent Presidents of the PGA have included Stanley Rubin, Leonard B. Stern, Kathleen Kennedy, Marshall Herskovitz, and the teams of Hawk Koch / Mark Gordon, and Gary Lucchesi / Lori McCreary.

The Golden Laurel Awards (subsequently renamed the Producers Guild of America Awards, a.k.a. PGA Awards) were first held in 1990, establishing the Guild Awards as one of the bellwethers for the Academy Awards. 20 of the 29 winners of the Producers Guild of America Award for Best Theatrical Motion Picture have gone on to win the Academy Award for Best Picture.

The Producers Guild of America's awards show was originally established in 1990 as the Golden Laurel Awards, created by PGA Treasurer Joel Freeman, Diane Robison, Terrie Frankel, Bernard Wiesen, and Charles B. FitzSimons with the support of Guild President Leonard B. Stern, in order to honor the visionaries who produce and execute motion picture and television product. The ceremony has been hosted each year by celebrity host/presenters, including Ronald Reagan, Ted Turner, Garry Marshall, Jack Lemmon, James Earl Jones, Grant Tinker, Michael Douglas, Walter Matthau, Shirley MacLaine, Marlo Thomas, Kevin Spacey, Mark Wahlberg, Kerry Washington, Anne Hathaway, Steve Carell, Neil Patrick Harris, and Jennifer Lawrence, among others.

In 2001, the Producers Guild of America merged with the American Association of Producers (AAP), enabling the Guild to represent all members of the producing team. Since that time, the Guild has been composed of three Councils: The Producers Council (representing producers, executive producers and co-producers), the AP Council (representing associate producers, production managers, production supervisors, segment and field producers, production coordinators, visual effects producers, and post-production staff) and the New Media Council.

In 2001, producers John Schwally, Nelle Nugent, and Steven Rosenbaum established the Producers Guild of America East Regional Chapter of the Guild, located in New York and servicing Guild members based on the East Coast. Since 2012, Peter Saraf has served as chair of the region.

In 2002, the Producers Guild established its New Media Council to recognize and represent producers working outside traditional television and film formats including, but not limited to, games (console, online and mobile), digital effects, digital animation, broadband and mobile storytelling, and more recently virtual reality, augmented reality and location-based attractions.

The PGA has an international committee aimed towards connecting producers across nations in creative industries. Founded by Stuart Levy, Nicholas de Wolff, and William Stuart, it is currently chaired by Gary Lucchesi and Sacha Ben Harroche.

Vance Van Petten served as the organization's National Executive Director from 2000 through 2021. Susan Sprung joined him in that position in 2019.

== The Producers Mark (p.g.a.) ==
In 2012, the Producers Guild introduced the "Producers Mark", a certification mark to feature film credits, allowing approved producers to add the lowercase initials p.g.a. following their "Produced By" credit.

Unlike other post-nominal letters that appear in motion picture credits (e.g., A.C.E., C.S.A.), the "Producers Mark" does not indicate membership in the Producers Guild. Rather, it certifies that the credited producer performed a major portion of the producing duties on a motion picture. The Mark is licensed for use in motion picture credits on a film-by-film basis. A producer's having received the Mark on a prior film has no impact on the decision to certify a current or future credit with the "Producers Mark".

During 2012 and 2013, Producers Guild of America Presidents Hawk Koch and Mark Gordon conducted negotiations and secured separate agreements with every major Hollywood studio requiring the studios to submit any films they developed and produced internally for "Producers Mark" certification. The first film to be released with the "Producers Mark" was The Magic of Belle Isle (which certified producers Lori McCreary, Alan Greisman, and Rob Reiner with the Mark), followed almost immediately thereafter by Lawless (which certified producers Lucy Fisher and Douglas Wick). Since that time, hundreds of motion pictures have had their credits certified via the "Producers Mark".

The Producers Guild determines which credited producers are eligible for certification via a thorough vetting process, requiring initial application from the film's owner/distributor and candid input from its producers, as well as numerous third party sources, which may include the film's director, writers, editors, cinematographer or other department heads. The Guild uses the same process to recommend which producers are eligible for producing honors and awards, including the Guild's "Darryl F. Zanuck Award" and the Academy Award for Best Picture given by the Academy of Motion Picture Arts and Sciences.

Any copyright owner of a film that has an established U.S. distributor may apply for the "Producers Mark", but application for and use of the "Producers Mark" by individual producers is purely voluntary.

== New Media Council ==
In 2002, the New Media Council was formed by the Producers Guild of America in order to recognize, represent, and protect producers working in digital and emerging media such as broadband and mobile entertainment, video games, digital visual effects, interactive television and DVDs. The PGA has announced its categorization of new media producers into five distinct fields: movie/video production, animated production, website production, interactive television production, and game production.

In January 2001, following a series of summits that brought together members of the New Media and traditional producing communities, producer Marc Levey spearheaded an initiative to revise the Producers Guild of America constitution to provide for the representation of New Media producers. This led to the formation of the New Media Council. Since its formation, the Council has sought to identify and address issues relevant to New Media and the PGA. These include how "New Media" should be defined and how the role of a New Media producer differs from or is similar to its counterpart in traditional media, recognizing that medium must serve the story and not the other way around.

On April 5, 2010, the Producers Guild of America Board of Directors officially approved its New Media Code of Credits, adding twenty-six major new credits to cover New Media producers. The code is significant in that it marks the first time the Producers Guild of America recognized New Media producer industry credits and responsibilities in Broadband, DVD/Blu-ray, Animation, Games (console and online), Mobile, Digital Visual Effects, iTV (interactive/enhanced Television), Special Venues, and Transmedia.

== Produced By ==
=== Produced By Conference ===
Since 2009, the Producers Guild has presented the "Produced By Conference", held annually in June on a studio lot in the Los Angeles area. In 2011, the Conference was held at Disney/ABC Studios. Each Conference offers a variety of educational sessions designed to promote the newest information about the state of the entertainment industry marketplace and allow experienced producers to share the benefit of their experience with emerging professionals. The "Produced By Conference" also offers a variety of other programs, including extensive vendor displays and technology demonstrations, numerous representatives of local, state and international film commissions, small-group Mentoring Roundtable discussions, and a variety of networking events, including the traditional Friday night Kick-Off Party.

Speakers at past conferences have included James Cameron, Clint Eastwood, Mark Cuban, Ted Turner, Gale Anne Hurd, Marshall Herskovitz, Mark Gordon, Hawk Koch, Alan Ball, Kathleen Kennedy, Matthew Weiner, Richard D. Zanuck, James L. Brooks, Douglas Wick, Lucy Fisher, Roger Corman, Norman Lear, Lawrence Gordon, Francis Ford Coppola, Seth Rogen, Kevin Smith, and Lauren Shuler Donner.

In 2011, the "Produced By Conference" was presented in association with AFCI Locations.

Since 2014, the Producers Guild of America has presented "Produced By: New York", a single-day conference event held annually in New York City. Speakers and guests at "Produced By: New York" have included Michael Moore, Alejandro González Iñárritu, Jake Gyllenhaal, Donna Gigliotti, James Schamus, Jenni Konner, Darren Aronofsky, Barbara Hall, and Cathy Schulman, among others.

=== Produced By magazine ===
Created by Vance Van Petton during his time serving as National Executive Director of the PGA, Produced By is an industry driven newsletter that highlights achievements in the producing field.

== Harvey Weinstein controversy ==
Harvey Weinstein is an American film producer, convicted sex offender, and member of the PGA until November 2017, when Weinstein faced sexual abuse allegations dating back to the late 1970s. By October, over 80 women had accused Weinstein of sexual harassment or assault. These accusations ignited the #MeToo movement on social media, leading to similar allegations against numerous influential figures globally, a phenomenon dubbed the "Weinstein effect".

=== Weinstein brothers awarded 2013 "Milestone Award" ===
Weinstein and his brother Bob were honored by the PGA during its 2013 awards ceremony. They were bestowed with the Milestone Award, the guild's most prestigious accolade.

=== Sexual abuse allegations ===
In October 2017, New York Times journalists Jodi Kantor and Megan Twohey exposed Weinstein's decades-long pattern of sexual harassment and settlements paid to actresses and employees. Their investigation, which took about five months, inspired Ronan Farrow, a correspondent for NBC News, to report on Weinstein in The New Yorker. Farrow revealed his earlier attempts to report on Weinstein's misconduct to NBC, suggesting the network faced pressure not to publish. Farrow's report included testimonies from executives and assistants who witnessed Weinstein's misconduct.

Since the initial reports in 2017, over 80 women have accused Weinstein of sexual harassment, assault, or rape. Led by Italian actress Asia Argento, a group of alleged victims released a list of over 100 instances of sexual abuse by Weinstein, spanning from 1980 to 2015, including eighteen allegations of rape. Weinstein allegedly lured young actresses or models into hotel rooms or offices under the guise of discussing their careers, then demanded massages or sex, often citing Gwyneth Paltrow as an example. Former colleagues claim that Weinstein's behavior was enabled by employees, associates, and agents who arranged these encounters, as well as by lawyers and publicists who silenced complaints with payments and threats. Bob Weinstein, also a member of the PGA and Harvey's brother, was reportedly involved in settlements with accusers, and Miramax employees felt the HR department prioritized Weinstein's protection over theirs.

=== PGA expulsion ===
The Producers Guild of America initiated proceedings to expel Weinstein in October 2017, after he was also expelled from other industry organizations, including the Academy of Motion Picture Arts and Sciences and the British Academy of Film and Television Arts. Before this could happen, The PGA announced on Monday, October 30, that Harvey Weinstein had resigned from the organization despite committees within the PGA starting proceedings to expel Weinstein on October 16.

The guild had voted on October 16 to initiate the process of expelling Harvey Weinstein, but his expulsion was not immediate due to the guild's bylaws, which mandated a termination process. According to the rules, members must be given 15 days' notice before disciplinary action is taken. However, the PGA was notified that instead of facing the guild's charges, Weinstein chose to resign his membership. In response, the guild issued a statement, declaring, "In light of Mr. Weinstein's widely reported behavior — with new reports continuing to surface even now — the Producers Guild's National Board has unanimously voted to impose a lifetime ban on Mr. Weinstein, permanently excluding him from PGA membership. This unprecedented action underscores the severity with which the Guild views the numerous reports of Mr. Weinstein's decades-long reprehensible conduct. Sexual harassment is no longer acceptable in our industry or among Producers Guild members. As previously announced, the PGA's Officers and National Board of Directors have established the Anti-Sexual Harassment Task Force, tasked specifically with researching and proposing meaningful and effective solutions to combat sexual harassment in the entertainment industry."

During the same meeting, the PGA's National Board — composed of 20 women and 18 men — also voted to establish a task force aimed at researching and addressing sexual harassment within the entertainment industry. Despite the widespread gender imbalance prevalent in Hollywood's craft guilds, with women significantly underrepresented across disciplines, 47% of the PGA's 8,100 members are women.

=== Anti-sexual harassment task force ===
During a special meeting on January 17, 2018, the PGA's board of directors unanimously approved its Anti-Sexual Harassment Guidelines. The guidelines include several specific recommendations, such as providing anti-sexual harassment training to all cast and crew members before production begins and before each season of ongoing series. Productions should designate at least two individuals, preferably of different genders, whom cast and crew can approach if they experience or witness harassment. Additionally, all meetings and casting sessions should take place in comfortable and safe environments.

In announcing the new guidelines, PGA presidents Gary Lucchesi and Lori McCreary emphasized the imperative to eradicate sexual harassment from the industry. They stated, "As producers, we play a vital role in fostering work environments founded on mutual respect, and it is our responsibility to drive cultural change and eliminate this abuse." While membership in the PGA is voluntary, the Anti-Sexual Harassment Guidelines are endorsed as best practices for members.

The guidelines outline definitions of sexual harassment and a hostile work environment, offer preventative measures for both on-set and off-set scenarios, and provide resources for those experiencing discomfort in their work environment. These proposals were crafted with input from Time's Up and were subsequently endorsed by the PGA's Anti-Sexual Harassment Task Force.

Lucchesi and McCreary expressed gratitude to Time's Up for their assistance in developing the protocols and affirmed the PGA's commitment to collaborate with them, as well as the industry-wide Commission led by Anita Hill and other community organizations, until sexual harassment is eradicated from the entertainment workplace.

In addition to implementing the guidelines, the PGA's Anti-Sexual Harassment Task Force is continuously reviewing tools for prevention, reporting, counseling, and protection. In its statement the PGA reaffirmed its dedication to establishing a Hollywood task force aimed at combating the pervasive harassment and abuse that the Weinstein scandal has brought to light. The statement emphasized, "Sexual harassment can no longer be tolerated in our industry or among Producers Guild members."

The anti-harassment program saw considerable progress in 2019, training 350 individuals in six months. The Independent Production Safety Initiative (IPSI), was established in late 2018. The IPSI program offers free training and legal advice to smaller productions lacking HR resources, funded by a 2 million dollar grant from CBS.

== Scott Rudin ==
In 2021, Scott Rudin, an American film, television and theatre producer, withdrew from his Broadway, film, and streaming endeavors after allegations of abusive behavior toward his employees surfaced in The Hollywood Reporter. As a consequence, his name was scrubbed from several forthcoming films, and his partnership with A24 studio was severed.

=== Anti-harassment initiative ===
The PGA broadened its Independent Production Safety Initiative to incorporate anti-bullying training, aiming to eradicate workplace violence and aggression, in response to he allegations against Rudin. In addition to this expansion, the guild established a task force to address these issues within its membership and the wider entertainment industry, affirming its dedication to collaborating with other organizations to combat such behavior.

In a statement, the PGA expressed deep concern over ongoing allegations of workplace harassment and abuse in the industry, pledging solidarity with those who spoke out against such violence and intimidation. The guild emphasized the collective responsibility to foster a more equitable and safe environment for all industry participants. Subsequently, Actors’ Equity Association urged The Broadway League to publicly address the accusations against Rudin, noting the PGA's statement and questioning the League's silence on the matter.

Actor's Equity Association Executive Director Mary McColl expressed concern over the Broadway League's lack of action following allegations against Rudin. Equity emphasizes the importance of a safe workplace and encourages reporting of bullying, discrimination, or safety issues, offering an anonymous hotline for members. Despite none of the individuals mentioned in the allegations being Equity members, the union remains committed to workplace safety for all. The Hollywood Reporter's article on April 7, 2018, alleged workplace abuse by Rudin, prompting a joint statement condemning harassment from Equity, IATSE, and SAG-AFTRA on April 12. Equity publicly requested Rudin release staff from NDAs on April 17 after private discussions with other unions and the Broadway League. Members experiencing or witnessing bullying, harassment, or intimidation can utilize Equity's anonymous hotline for assistance.

== Producers Guild of America Awards ==
In 1990, the inaugural Golden Laurel Awards were hosted by the Producers Guild, an initiative spearheaded by PGA Treasurer Joel Freeman and endorsed by Guild President Leonard Stern. These awards aimed to celebrate the visionaries behind the creation and execution of motion picture and television content. Later, in 2002, the ceremony underwent a name change to become the Producers Guild of America Awards.

=== Film Awards ===
- Darryl F. Zanuck Award for Outstanding Producer of Theatrical Motion Pictures
- Outstanding Producer of Documentary Motion Picture
- Outstanding Producer of Animated Theatrical Motion Pictures
- Norman Felton Award for Outstanding Producer of Episodic Television - Drama
- Danny Thomas Award for Outstanding Producer of Episodic Television - Comedy
- David L. Wolper Award for Outstanding Producer of Limited Series Television
- Outstanding Producer of Televised or Streamed Motion Pictures
- Outstanding Producer of Non-Fiction Television
- Outstanding Producer of Live Entertainment & Talk Television
- Outstanding Producer of Game & Competition Television
- The Award for Outstanding Short-Form Program
- The Award for Outstanding Sports Program
- The Award for Outstanding Children's Program
- The PGA Innovation Award
  - The award recognizes exceptional innovations in virtual reality (VR), augmented reality (AR), experiential, and other forms of interactive or immersive media.

=== Honorary Awards ===
- David O. Selznick Achievement Award in Theatrical Motion Pictures
  - This award acknowledges a producer or producing team for their exceptional contributions to the world of motion pictures.
- Milestone Award
  - The Guild established the Milestone Award Dinner to honor individuals or teams whose historic contributions have significantly impacted the motion picture industry. This award stands as the Guild's highest honor, recognizing outstanding contributions to entertainment.
- Norman Lear Achievement Award in Television
  - Recognizing excellence in television, this award celebrates the outstanding body of work of a producer or producing team.
- Visionary Award
  - The Producers Guild Visionary Award celebrates producers in television, film, or emerging media whose unique storytelling or performances uplift and inspire our culture.
- Stanley Kramer Award
  - Presented to outstanding contributions in film, television, or related fields, this award recognizes individuals or entities whose work sheds light on important social issues in an accessible and thought-provoking manner.

=== Stanley Kramer Award ===
Since 2002, this award has been given for films that "illuminate provocative social issues". The latest honoree is Chinonye Chukwu's film Till, produced by Keith Beauchamp, Barbara Broccoli, Whoopi Goldberg, Thomas Levine, Michael Reilly, and Frederick Zollo.

=== Film winners ===
==== 2024 winners ====
- Theatrical Motion Picture

* Oppenheimer

Emma Thomas, Charles Roven, and Christopher Nolan

- Animated Motion Picture

* Spider-Man: Across the Spider-Verse

Avi Arad, Amy Pascal, Phil Lord, Christopher Miller, and Christina Steinberg

- Documentary Theatrical Motion Picture

* American Symphony

Lauren Domino, Matthew Heineman, and Joedan Okun

=== Television winners ===
==== 2024 winners ====
- Comedy Series

* The Bear

Josh Senior, Joanna Calo, Christopher Storer, Matty Matheson, Cooper Wehde, Rene Gube, and Tyson Bidner

- Drama Series

* Succession

Jesse Armstrong, Adam McKay, Will Ferrell, Frank Rich, Kevin Messick, Mark Mylod, Jane Tranter, Tony Roche, Scott Ferguson, Jon Brown, Lucy Prebble, Will Tracy, Georgia Pritchett, Ted Cohen, Dara Schnapper, Susan Soon He Stanton, Gabrielle Mahon, and Francesca Gardiner

- Limited or Anthology Series

* Beef

Lee Sung Jin, Steven Yeun, Ali Wong, Jake Schreier, Ravi Nandan, Alli Reich, Carrie Kemper, Jes Anderson, Savey Cathey, Inman Young, Matthew Medlin, Alex Russell, and Alice Ju

== The Charles B. FitzSimons Honorary Lifetime Membership Award ==
For "outstanding contribution and enduring dedication to the Producers Guild of America".

- 1991: Charles B. FitzSimons
- 1992: Stanley Rubin
- 1993: Leonard B. Stern
- 1994: Bob Finkel
- 1995: Joel Freeman
- 1996: Robert B. Radnitz
- 1997: Norman Felton
- 1999: Charles W. Fries
- 2000: Diane L. Robison
- 2001: George Sunga
- 2002: Marian Rees
- 2003: Hawk Koch
- 2004: Debra Hill
- 2006: Kathleen Kennedy
- 2007: Gale Anne Hurd
- 2008: David V. Picker
- 2009: Tim Gibbons
- 2010: Marshall Herskovitz
- 2011: Dorothea Petrie
- 2012: Fred Baron
- 2013: Carole Beams
- 2014: Mark Gordon

== The AP Council Commitment Award ==
The "AP Council Commitment Award" is given to a Producers Guild of America member who, in the opinion of the AP Council Board of Delegates, has made extraordinary and long-standing contributions to the Guild as a member of the AP Council. The award is presented to recipients at the Guild's annual general membership meeting.

- 2004: Susan Sherayko
- 2006: Erin O'Malley
- 2007: Victoria Slater
- 2008: Pixie Wespiser
- 2009: Carole Beams
- 2010: Rachel Klein
- 2011: Kathleen Courtney
- 2012: Christina Lee Storm
- 2013: Jeffrey Lerner
- 2014: Kay Rothman
- 2017: Megan Mascena Gaspar
- 2019: Derek Bartholomaus

== The Marc A. Levey Distinguished Service Award ==
This Service Award was originally established in 2006 by the Producers Guild of America in order to recognize and honor any member who has distinguished herself or himself by exceptionally meritorious service to the Producers Guild and its New Media Council. The award is presented to recipients at the Guild's annual membership meeting and entitles recipients to join the Council's Leadership Roundtable.

Past recipients of this award include:

- 2006: James Fino, Cindy A. Pound, and Alison Savitch
- 2007: Iyan Bruce and Marc Scarpa
- 2008: Shawn Gold and Amy Jacobson Kurokawa
- 2009: Jeanette DePatie, Brandon Grande, and Chris Pfaff
- 2010: John Heinsen, Derek Hildebrant, and Chris Thomes
- 2011: Dina Benadon
- 2012: Felicia Wong
- 2013: Michael Palmieri
- 2014: Brian Seth Hurst
- 2015: Vicente Williams
- 2016: Caitlin Burns
- 2017: Emily Barclay Ford
- 2018: Renee Rosenfeld
- 2019: Kate McCallum
- 2020: John Canning
- 2021: Ed Lantz
- 2022: Charles Howard

=== History ===
The award's namesake, Marc Levey, an active member of the Guild since 1995, recognized that games and many other digital productions maintained budgets, timelines and revenues that rivaled those of television and film productions of the time. In 1999, Levey began to spearhead a three-year process within the Producers Guild to recognize, represent and protect the interests of producers working outside the "traditional" formats of television and film. Levey's vision and leadership resulted in the official amendment of the PGA's Constitution and the establishment of the Guild's New Media Council. In recognition of his efforts, the Guild officially established this annual service award in his name.

== Current board of directors ==
The Producer's Guild of America is overseen by a Board of Directors, who act as the organization's fiduciaries.

- Stephanie Allain, President
- Donald De Line, President
- Charles Roven, Vice President, Motion Pictures
- Lauren Shuler Donner, Vice President, Motion Pictures
- Mike Farah, Vice Presidents, Television
- Melvin Mar, Vice President, Television
- Steve Cainas, Vice President, Producing Team
- Donna Gigliotti, Vice President, Eastern Region Steering Group
- Yolanda T. Cochran, Treasurer
- Mike Jackson, Recording Secretary
- Gail Berman, President Emeritus
- Lucy Fisher, President Emeritus

== See also ==
- Alliance of Motion Picture and Television Producers
