= Divergent (film) =

2014 film by Neil Burger

- Theatrical release poster
- Directed by: Neil Burger
- Screenplay by: Evan Daugherty; Vanessa Taylor
- Based on: Divergent by Veronica Roth
- Produced by: Douglas Wick; Lucy Fisher; Pouya Shahbazian
- Starring: Shailene Woodley; Theo James; Ashley Judd; Jai Courtney; Ray Stevenson; Zoë Kravitz; Miles Teller; Tony Goldwyn; Maggie Q; Kate Winslet
- Cinematography: Alwin Küchler
- Edited by: Richard Francis-Bruce; Nancy Richardson
- Music by: Junkie XL
- Production companies: Summit Entertainment; Red Wagon Entertainment
- Distributed by: Lionsgate
- Release dates: March 18, 2014 (Los Angeles Premiere); March 21, 2014 (United States)
- Running time: 139 minutes
- Country: United States
- Language: English
- Budget: $85 million
- Box office: $288.9 million

Divergent is a 2014 American dystopian film directed by Neil Burger, based on the 2011 novel by Veronica Roth. The film is the first installment in The Divergent Series and was produced by Douglas Wick, Lucy Fisher, and Pouya Shahbazian, with a screenplay by Evan Daugherty and Vanessa Taylor. It stars Shailene Woodley, Theo James, Ashley Judd, Jai Courtney, Ray Stevenson, Zoë Kravitz, Miles Teller, Tony Goldwyn, Ansel Elgort, Maggie Q, and Kate Winslet. The story takes place in a dystopian and post-apocalyptic Chicago where people are divided into distinct factions based on human virtues. Beatrice Prior is warned that she is Divergent and thus will never fit into any one of the factions. Soon, she learns that a sinister plot is brewing in the seemingly perfect society.

Development of Divergent began in March 2011 when Summit Entertainment picked up the film rights to the novel with Douglas Wick and Lucy Fisher's production company Red Wagon Entertainment. Principal photography began April 16, 2013, and concluded on July 16, 2013, with re-shoots taking place from January 24–26, 2014. Production mostly took place in Chicago.

Divergent was released on March 21, 2014, in the United States. The film received mixed reviews: although its action sequences and performances, notably Woodley's, were praised, critics deemed its execution and handling of its themes to be generic and unoriginal, and compared it unfavorably to other young adult fiction adaptations. The film grossed $288.9 million worldwide against its budget of $85 million. It was released on DVD and Blu-ray on August 5, 2014.

A sequel, Insurgent, was released on March 20, 2015, in the United States and other countries. A third film, Allegiant, was released on March 18, 2016. A fourth and final film, Ascendant, was never produced.

== Plot ==
In a futuristic dystopian Chicago, society is divided into five factions: Abnegation (the selfless), Amity (the kind), Candor (the honest), Dauntless (the brave), and Erudite (the intelligent). The remaining population, the Factionless, holds no status or privilege as they primarily wander the streets. Upon turning 16, children undergo a serum-induced psychological aptitude test that reveals their best-suited faction, although they can choose any faction as their permanent group during the subsequent Choosing Ceremony.

Beatrice Prior lives in Abnegation, which runs the government. Her father, Andrew, and Abnegation's leader, Marcus Eaton, serve on the ruling council. When Beatrice is tested, her results show equal attributes of multiple factions: Abnegation, Erudite, and Dauntless, making her a Divergent. Her proctor Tori Wu, a Dauntless woman, records her results as Abnegation. She warns her to conceal her accurate results because Divergents can think independently and would threaten the existing social order.

The next day, Beatrice's brother Caleb chooses Erudite at the Choosing Ceremony, while she selects Dauntless. She meets Christina, Al, and Will, other faction transfers. Christina and Al are from Candor, and Will is from Erudite. Dauntless leader Eric Coulter warns the initiates that those who fail to meet the faction's high standards will become Factionless. Beatrice jumps from a tall building into a dark hole, landing in a net and gaining respect from Four, a transferred instructor. When asked her name, she chooses to change it to "Tris".

Tris initially struggles in Dauntless training and ranks far below the cutoff after the first evaluation, but with Four's help, she slowly improves. Eric then matches her against her nemesis, Candor transfer Peter Hayes, in a fight that ends with Tris' defeat and recovery in the infirmary.

Unwilling to miss the crucial Capture the Flag test, she leaves the infirmary, joins the other initiates, secures her team's victory, and makes the final cut. In the next training phase, the initiates confront their deepest fears in psychological simulations. Tris' divergence enables her to navigate the tests creatively, but Four cautions her to conceal her abilities and to approach the challenges as a typical Dauntless would.

Tris visits Caleb, who tells her that Erudite plans to overthrow Abnegation. When she returns, Al, Peter, and their fellow Candor transfer Drew attack her in an attempt to kill her, but Four rescues her. The next day, Al begs Tris to forgive him, but she refuses and calls him a coward. He later kills himself by jumping into "The Pit".

Four takes Tris into his fear simulations to prepare her for the final test. There, she learns that he is Tobias Eaton and that his father, Marcus, used to beat him as a child. He also reveals that he, too, is divergent. Tris then passes her test and officially joins Dauntless. The Dauntless recruits are injected with a serum from Erudite, supposedly for tracking but actually for mind control.

The next day, the Dauntless prepares to attack Abnegation under Erudite's orders. As the serum fails on Divergents, Tris must blend in to avoid suspicion as Coulter discovered a divergent in his ranks and killed him. She finds Four, who also pretends to be under control but actually did not take the serum. When the Dauntless raid Abnegation, they split from their group to find Beatrice's parents. However, Eric captures Four, realizing he's divergent, and orders Tris' execution. Her mother, Natalie, a former Dauntless, saves her but is later shot and killed during their escape.

Tris finds her father hiding with Caleb, Marcus, and several Abnegation members. The group sneaks into Erudites headquarters, where Tris encounters Peter and forces him to lead them to Erudite's control center. Her father sacrifices himself in a shootout, so Tris goes in alone to find Four, who is now under mind control.

Knowing Four's fears, Tris manages to wake him from the mind control, and both enter the central control room, where Erudite's leader, Jeanine Matthews, has Dauntless prepared to execute nearly the entire Abnegation faction. Tris uses a sample of the mind control serum on Jeanine to force her to erase the program, ruining her plot. The group escapes the compound and boards a train.

== Cast ==
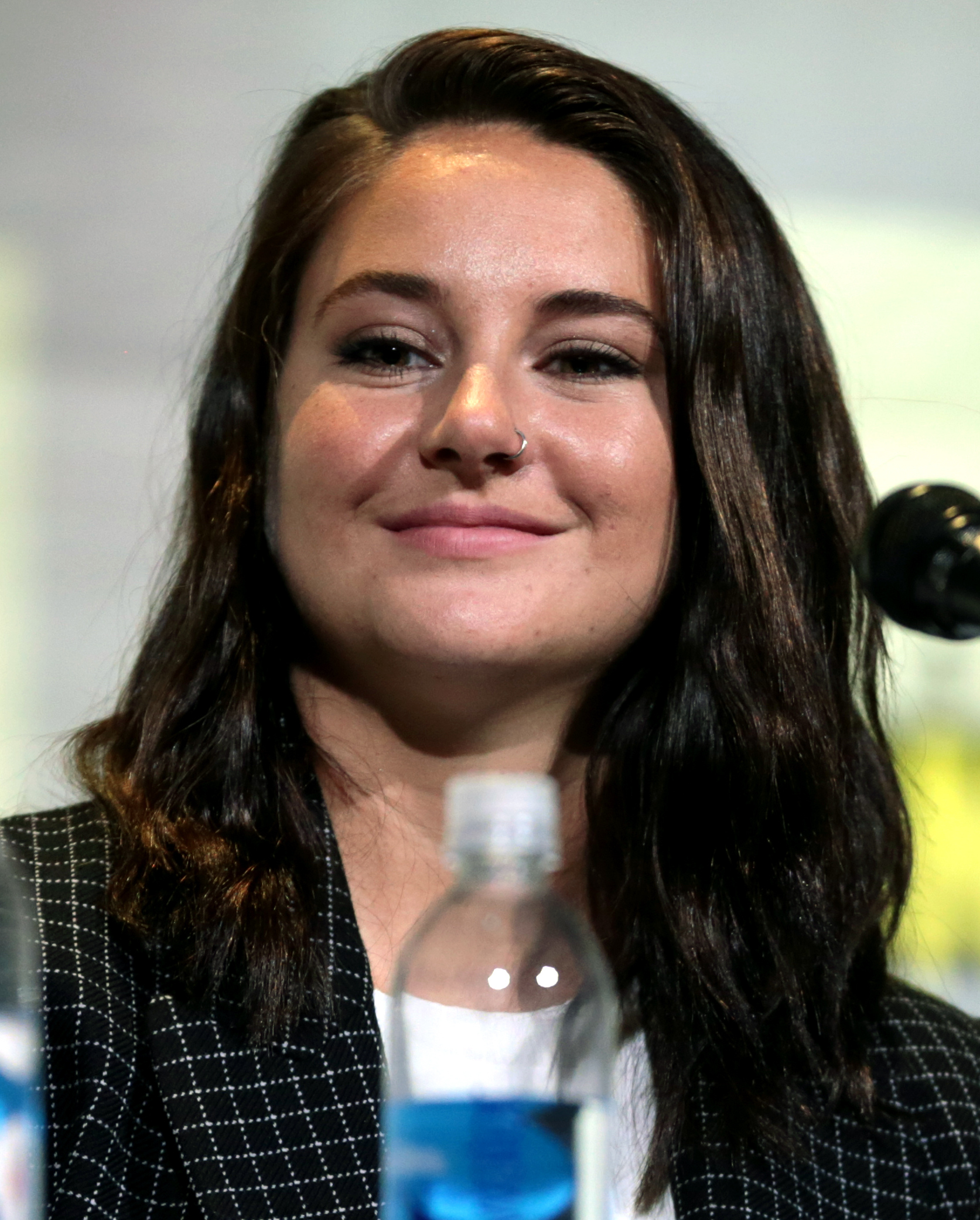
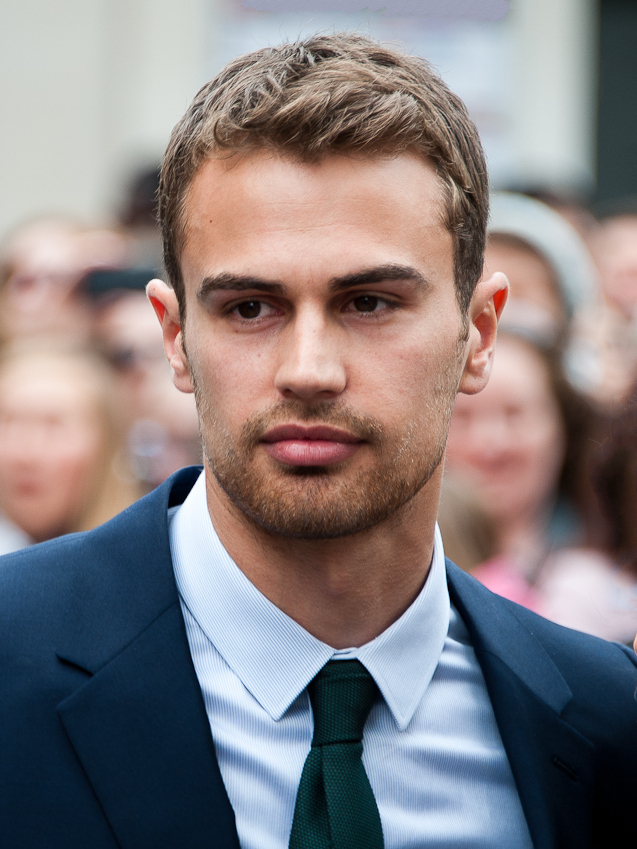
Shailene Woodley (left) and Theo James (right), who play the lead roles in the film
- Shailene Woodley as Beatrice "Tris" Prior, a 16-year-old girl formerly of Abnegation who joins Dauntless
  - Elyse Cole as 10 year old Tris
- Theo James as Tobias "Four" Eaton, a Dauntless instructor who becomes Tris's boyfriend
- Ashley Judd as Natalie Prior, Tris's mother
- Jai Courtney as Eric Coulter, the ruthless leader of Dauntless
- Ray Stevenson as Marcus Eaton, the city council leader of Abnegation and Four's father
- Zoë Kravitz as Christina, a new member of Dauntless and a friend of Tris
- Miles Teller as Peter Hayes, a member of Dauntless who was an original member of Candor
- Tony Goldwyn as Andrew Prior, Tris's father and a member of Abnegation
- Ansel Elgort as Caleb Prior, Tris's brother who is a member of Erudite
- Maggie Q as Tori Wu, Tris's test administrator
- Mekhi Phifer as Max
- Kate Winslet as Jeanine Matthews, the leader of Erudite faction
- Ben Lloyd-Hughes as Will
- Christian Madsen as Albert
- Amy Newbold as Molly Atwood

== Production ==
=== Pre-production ===
In March 2011, Summit Entertainment picked up the rights for Divergent with Douglas Wick and Lucy Fisher's production company Red Wagon Entertainment. Neil Burger was announced as the director on August 23, 2012. Evan Daugherty, who co-wrote the screenplay with Vanessa Taylor, said, "I get hung up on the toughness of the movie but of equal importance is the love story between Tris and Four. It's inherently and inextricably linked to Tris's character journey. There will be plenty of sexual tension and chemistry, but it's important that all of that stuff doesn't just feel like it's thrown in, but that it all helps Tris grow as a character."

Daugherty further added, "It's tricky because the book is a very packed read with a lot of big ideas. So, distilling that into a cool, faithful two-hour movie is challenging. Not only do you have to establish five factions, but you have to acknowledge that there's a sixth entity, which is the divergent, and you also have the factionless. So there's a world that really has to be built out for the big screen... the movie is going to do it a little more efficiently." Author Veronica Roth said about script of the film, "Reading a script is a really interesting experience. I'd never read a script before. I was really impressed by how closely it stuck to the general plot line of the book."

Initially, the budget of the film was $40 million but Lionsgate later increased it to $80 million (which finally changed to $85 million) due to the success of The Hunger Games. Analyst Ben Mogil said, "Divergent is more similar to Hunger Games in that the company owns the underlying economics (i.e. production) and the budget (at $80[million]) is more manageable."

=== Casting ===
On October 22, 2012, it was announced that Shailene Woodley had landed the lead role of Beatrice "Tris" Prior. Lucas Till, Jack Reynor, Jeremy Irvine, Alex Pettyfer, Brenton Thwaites, Alexander Ludwig and Luke Bracey were all considered for the role of Tobias "Four" Eaton. On March 15, 2013, it was announced that Theo James had been cast as Four.

Although James was 10 years older than his character when cast, Roth praised his casting: "I was sure within seconds: this was 'Four', no question. Theo is able to capture 'Four's' authority and strength, as well as his depth and sensitivity." She also mentions the chemistry between him and Shailene: "He is a perfect match for Shailene's incredibly strong presence as Tris. I'm thrilled!" The producers said about his casting: "We took our time to find the right actor to fill the role of Four, and Theo is definitely the perfect fit. Veronica has crafted a truly iconic character in Four and we cannot wait to begin production and bring him and this story to life for millions of fans around the world."

On March 11, 2013, it was announced that the roles of Tori, Christina, and Caleb had gone to Maggie Q, Zoë Kravitz, and Ansel Elgort respectively. Ray Stevenson, Jai Courtney and Aaron Eckhart were announced to be in talks to join the cast on March 15, 2013. Stevenson and Courtney joined the cast as Marcus Eaton and Eric. That same day, Miles Teller was cast as Peter. Kate Winslet was announced to be in talks on January 24, 2013. Later, it was confirmed that she would portray Jeanine Matthews.

Talking about playing the negative character for the first time, Winslet said, "I'm no idiot. The idea went through my head that I have never played a baddie before, I was almost kind of surprised." Since Winslet joined filming late, she used that distance from her co-stars to appear aloof on the first day of her shoot. "I wanted to break it and say, 'It's OK, I'm really fun. I promise.' But I thought, just for today, I'd let them think that I am a complete bitch."

Winslet was five months pregnant during the shooting of the film and her pregnancy was concealed using various props. According to Burger, "We had to be very strategic in the way that we shot her. She always had some sort of file or case in her hand that was sort of protecting, you know, her bump." On March 25, 2013, Ben Lamb was cast as Edward, Ben Lloyd-Hughes as Will, and Christian Madsen as Al. In April 2013, Ashley Judd and Tony Goldwyn joined the cast as Natalie and Andrew Prior, Beatrice's parents.

=== Filming ===
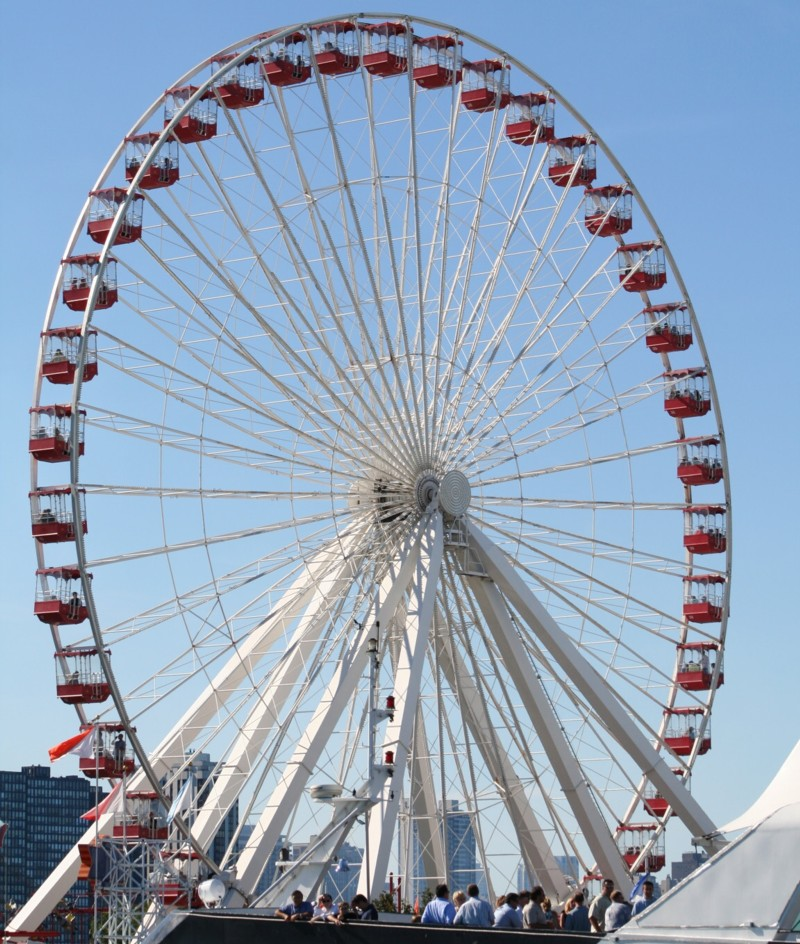
The Ferris wheel scene in Divergent was filmed at Navy Pier.

Filming began in Chicago on April 16, 2013, and concluded on July 16, 2013. Virtually all production photography took place in Chicago; many of the interior locations were filmed at Cinespace Chicago Film Studios. Scenes for the "choosing ceremony" were shot at Seventeenth Church of Christ, Scientist on East Wacker in downtown Chicago, with outdoor shots taken at Pioneer Court. Filming also took place at the Navy Pier Ferris Wheel; the entire area was treated with dirt and rust to appear more dystopian. Additional scenes were shot at 57th Street and Ellis Avenue near the University of Chicago, at Federal Street where fake L tracks were constructed and at Michigan Avenue. Scenes were also filmed in the University of Chicago's Joe and Rika Mansueto Library.

For the Abnegation sector, the production team constructed the set on Wells Street in downtown Chicago. In late June, filming took place at 1500 S Western Avenue and 600 S. Wells Street, Chicago. In the last schedule, filming moved to the Chicago River and continued at Lake Street Bridge, Wacker Drive and LaSalle Street Bridge. Filming wrapped on July 16, 2013. On January 24, 2014, additional filming began in Los Angeles, finishing two days later, which officially became the last day of shooting.

=== Post-production ===
Post-production work began after filming wrapped. On July 18, Summit and Lionsgate issued a joint statement announcing the film would be released in IMAX format: "We're delighted to continue our successful collaboration with IMAX, with whom we have already partnered on the global blockbuster Hunger Games and Twilight Saga franchises, and we're especially pleased that we can introduce our newest young adult franchise, Divergent, to the movie going public in the premium IMAX format that celebrates its status as a special and memorable event."

== Music ==
The score for Divergent was composed by Junkie XL and executive produced by his longtime mentor Hans Zimmer, featuring vocal contributions from Ellie Goulding on four of the tracks as "the inner voice of [...] Tris". Goulding's "Beating Heart" was also included in the film as original soundtrack and later the assisting video was also released from her YouTube channel. "Dead in the Water" and other songs from her 2012 album, Halcyon, were also included on the soundtrack. Randall Poster served as the film's music supervisor. The original soundtrack was released on March 11, 2014, while the original score of the film was released on March 18, 2014, by Interscope Records.

== Distribution ==
=== Marketing ===
The first image of Shailene Woodley as Beatrice "Tris" Prior was revealed by Entertainment Weekly on April 24, 2013. A few seconds of sneak preview film footage was shown at the 2013 Cannes Film Festival. On June 7, Entertainment Weekly released a still of Theo James (Four) showing the Dauntless initiates around their new headquarters. The magazine released several more stills on July 19. On July 16, USA Today released the first image of Kate Winslet as Jeanine Matthews.

On July 18, 2013, Summit held a sold-out San Diego Comic-Con panel in Hall H. Shailene Woodley, Theo James, Maggie Q, Zoe Kravitz, Ansel Elgort, Ben Lloyd-Hughes, Amy Newbold, Miles Teller, Christian Madsen, director Neil Burger, and author Veronica Roth attended the panel and answered fan questions, along with the showing of exclusive film clips.

On August 22, 2013, a sneak peek of the first teaser trailer was released by MTV. The full teaser was released on August 25, 2013, during the pre-show of the MTV Video Music Awards. Two official posters featuring Woodley and James as Tris and Four and highlighting their tattoos were released on September 23, 2013. Neil Burger released the full official trailer on November 13, 2013. On February 4, 2014, Shailene Woodley and Theo James released the final trailer for the film during their appearance on Jimmy Kimmel Live!.

The marketing campaign for the film cost at least $50 million.

=== Release ===
On its first day of advance ticket sales, the film sold half of its tickets.

=== Home media ===
Divergent was released on DVD and Blu-ray on August 5, 2014. Prior to its DVD release, a deleted scene from the film featuring Miles Teller as Peter Hayes and Ben Lamb as Edward was released July 30, 2014.

== Reception ==
=== Box office ===
Divergent grossed $150.9 million in North America, and $137.9 million in other countries, for a worldwide total of $288.9 million. Factoring in all revenues and expenses, Deadline Hollywood estimated that the film made a profit of $71.87 million.

On its opening weekend, the film attained the No. 1 spot in domestic and worldwide box office rankings by Rentrak. The film grossed $4.9 million in late night screenings, on Thursday March 20, 2014. On its opening day, the film grossed $22.8 million in the United States (including the Thursday night gross). Divergent accumulated $54,607,747 from 3,936 theaters at an average of $13,873 per theater, on its opening weekend in the United States and Canada and grossed $1.7 million internationally from four territories, with a worldwide total of $56,307,747.

=== Critical response ===
Divergent received mixed reviews from critics. Review aggregator Rotten Tomatoes gives the film an approval rating of 41% based on 238 reviews, with an average rating of 5.40/10. The site's critical consensus reads, "With an adherence to YA formula that undercuts its individualistic message, Divergent opens its planned trilogy in disappointingly predictable fashion." Metacritic gives the film a score of 48 out of 100, based on 38 critics, indicating "mixed or average" reviews. Audiences surveyed by CinemaScore gave it a grade of "A". The survey group was 69% female, and half was over 25.

The main criticisms of the film were its generic execution and predictable plot. Bruce Diones of The New Yorker called it "barely diverting", and Jordan Adler of We Got This Covered said it was a "plodding and generic dystopian drama". Several critics have compared the film unfavorably with other young adult fiction adaptations such as Harry Potter and, predominantly, The Hunger Games. Andrew Barker of Variety said, "Unlike the Harry Potter series' tangible, fully dimensional Hogwarts or The Hunger Games' colorfully variegated districts, Divergent's vision of new Chicago doesn't have much to distinguish it from a standard-issue post-apocalyptic pic." Peter Travers of Rolling Stone wrote that, "At least The Hunger Games spawned two terrific movies and a breakthrough star in Jennifer Lawrence. Onscreen, Divergent ignites only indifference."

Peter Debruge of Variety considered it a much better adaptation writing that, "[although] it shares a fair amount of DNA in common with The Hunger Games, it ranks as far superior". According to Todd Gilchrist of The Playlist, "Woodley makes for more than uncertain enough of a hero to add detail and meaning to the implosion of this world", adding that "there's little artifice to her performance, and the mundane honesty of her reactions create a believability that the world would otherwise lack." About James's performance, Gilchrist adds that he "manages the considerable accomplishment of seeming like a real grown-up man" and that he "makes the character's transformation from hardass to collaborator seem natural, if inevitable". Drew McWeeny at HitFix said, "it helps that [they] got Woodley and James in the leads. [Woodley's] like a walking empathy battery, wide-open emotionally, easy to read and enormously appealing", also adding that James is "incredibly natural onscreen".

Andrew Osmond of SFX magazine was more receptive to the film, calling it "an often entertaining, and sometimes very interesting, piece of teen SF". Orlando Weekly's Sam Allard gave the film a 3/5 rating, praising Shailene Woodley's performance by saying she "rescues and then raises up a film that could have been an utter disaster". Christy Lemire of RogerEbert.com agreed with this sentiment, writing, "the performances—namely from stars Shailene Woodley and Theo James and Kate Winslet in a juicy supporting role—always make the movie watchable and often quite engaging".

Michael O'Sullivan of The Washington Post felt that the film surpassed its source material, feeling that "it's rare that a movie is as good as the book on which it's based. It's even more unusual when it's better." Leigh Paatsch of the Herald Sun dubbed the film a "solid first-up effort for the Divergent franchise", and Margaret Pomeranz of At the Movies gave praise to director Neil Burger, stating that he "handles the action with aplomb".

The Playlist's Todd Gilchrist gave it a mixed review saying that it has "great ideas ... and some terrific character work, but it's given such uneven attention, alternately languished upon and glossed over". IGN's Matt Patches gave it 5.8 out of 10, citing its similarities to other young adult films and contrived Dauntless plot line. He praised lead actors Theo James and Shailene Woodley's performances, judging that they "add personality and physicality to the limp script they're acting out". Scott Mendelson of Forbes magazine echoed these sentiments, arguing that despite Woodley's excellent performance, "the generic story reduced a large portion of the mythology to irrelevancy". Mendelson believed that the film would please the novel's fanbase.

=== Accolades ===
Award	Category	Nominee(s)	Result
MTV Movie Awards	Favorite Character	Beatrice "Tris" Prior	Won
Teen Choice Awards	Choice Movie: Action	Divergent	Won
Teen Choice Awards	Choice Movie Actor: Action	Theo James	Won
Teen Choice Awards	Choice Movie Actress: Action	Shailene Woodley	Won
Teen Choice Awards	Choice Movie: Villain	Kate Winslet	Nominated
Teen Choice Awards	Choice Movie: Breakout Star	Theo James	Nominated
Visual Effects Society Awards	Outstanding Supporting Visual Effects in a Photoreal/Live Action Feature Motion Picture	Jim Berney, Greg Baxter, Matt Dessero	Nominated
Young Hollywood Awards	Fan Favorite Actor – Male	Theo James	Nominated
Young Hollywood Awards	Fan Favorite Actor – Female	Shailene Woodley	Nominated
Young Hollywood Awards	Best On-Screen Couple	Shailene Woodley and Theo James	Nominated
Young Hollywood Awards	Best Cast Chemistry – Film	Divergent	Nominated
Young Hollywood Awards	Favorite Flick	Divergent	Nominated
Broadcast Film Critics Association Award	Best Actress in an Action Movie	Shailene Woodley	Nominated
People's Choice Awards	Favorite Action Movie	Divergent	Won
People's Choice Awards	Favorite Action Movie Actress	Shailene Woodley	Nominated
People's Choice Awards	Favorite Movie Duo	Shailene Woodley and Theo James	Won

== Franchise ==
=== Sequels ===
On May 7, 2013, Summit Entertainment revealed that a sequel based on Insurgent was in the works. Brian Duffield, writer of Jane Got a Gun, was hired to write the script. The sequel was released on March 20, 2015. The third film, based on the novel Allegiant, was initially announced as a single film scheduled for release on March 18, 2016. In December 2013, it was announced that Neil Burger will not return to direct the sequel, due to him still working on the first film. On February 11, 2014, it was announced that Robert Schwentke would take Burger's place for the next installment. Principal photography for The Divergent Series: Insurgent began in Atlanta on May 27, 2014, and concluded on September 6, 2014.

On April 11, 2014, Summit Entertainment announced that the third film would split into two films titled The Divergent Series: Allegiant – Part 1 and The Divergent Series: Allegiant – Part 2, with Part 1 scheduled to be released on March 18, 2016, and Part 2 scheduled to be released on June 9, 2017. On December 5, 2014, it was announced that Robert Schwentke would return to direct Part 1. On September 10, 2015, it was announced that the two films would be re-titled, with Part 1 being renamed as Allegiant and Part 2 as Ascendant.

On February 8, 2016, it was reported that Robert Schwentke, who directed both Insurgent and Allegiant, would not return to direct for the final film. Lee Toland Krieger was to replace Schwentke as the director of the film. A theatrical release for Ascendant was later cancelled in favor of developing a television film and spinoff series for Starz. Star Shailene Woodley refused to be part of this TV adaptation which violated her contract which specified that the project had to be a theatrical film release. Sources close to the production have said that, due to the COVID-19 outbreak and waning network interest in the project, it is uncertain if the series will ever be completed.

== See also ==
- The Giver (film)
- The Hunger Games (film)

== Readings ==
- Divergent: production notes, tour // Summit Entertainment (copy of pdf)
