= The Divergent Series: Insurgent =

2015 film by Robert Schwentke

- Theatrical release poster
- Directed by: Robert Schwentke
- Written by: Brian Duffield; Akiva Goldsman; Mark Bomback
- Based on: Insurgent by Veronica Roth
- Produced by: Douglas Wick; Lucy Fisher; Pouya Shabazian
- Starring: Shailene Woodley; Octavia Spencer; Kate Winslet; Jai Courtney; Ray Stevenson; Zoë Kravitz; Miles Teller; Ansel Elgort; Maggie Q; Naomi Watts
- Cinematography: Florian Ballhaus
- Edited by: Nancy Richardson; Stuart Levy
- Music by: Joseph Trapanese
- Production companies: Summit Entertainment; Red Wagon Entertainment; Mandeville Films
- Distributed by: Lionsgate
- Release dates: March 11, 2015 (London); March 20, 2015 (United States)
- Running time: 119 minutes
- Country: United States
- Language: English
- Budget: $110 million
- Box office: $297.3 million

The Divergent Series: Insurgent (simply known as Insurgent) is a 2015 American dystopian film directed by Robert Schwentke, based on the 2012 novel Insurgent, the second book in the Divergent trilogy by Veronica Roth. It is the sequel to the 2014 film Divergent and the second installment in The Divergent Series, produced by Lucy Fisher, Pouya Shabazian and Douglas Wick, with a screenplay by Brian Duffield, Akiva Goldsman and Mark Bomback. Schwentke took over from Neil Burger as director, with Burger serving as the executive producer of the film. Along with the first film's returning cast, led by Shailene Woodley and Theo James, the sequel features supporting actors Octavia Spencer, Kate Winslet, Naomi Watts, Suki Waterhouse, Rosa Salazar, Daniel Dae Kim, Jonny Weston, Emjay Anthony, and Keiynan Lonsdale.

The plot of Insurgent takes place five days after the previous installment and continues to follow Dauntless soldier Tris Prior; Tris and Four, her Dauntless instructor, are on the run after evading a coup from Erudite faction leader Jeanine and the rest of her faction. The faction system in post-apocalyptic Chicago is crumbling, and everyone is desperate for power — and answers. Filming began on May 27, 2014, in Atlanta, Georgia, before concluding on September 6, 2014.

The Divergent Series: Insurgent was released on March 20, 2015 by Lionsgate Films under its Summit Entertainment label, in the United States in the IMAX 3D format as well as regular 3D and 2D. Critical reaction to the film was mixed. Some considered the film to be an improvement over its predecessor, with the visual style, action sequences, and Woodley's performance being singled out for praise; criticism focused on the film's storyline and derivative nature. The film was a commercial success, grossing $52.2 million in its opening weekend and reaching the number one spot at the box-office. During its release in theaters, the film earned $297.3 million worldwide, becoming the highest-grossing film in the series.

A sequel, Allegiant, was released on March 18, 2016.

== Plot ==
Five days after the assault on the Abnegation faction by the Erudite leader Jeanine and her mind-controlled Dauntless soldiers, (Note: As depicted in Divergent (film) (2014)) Jeanine has declared martial law, insisting the Divergents and their allies are the enemies.

Among the Abnegation wreckage, the Dauntless leaders Max and Eric recover a box with all five faction symbols on its sides. Jeanine presumes it contains data from the city's founders and the means to end the Divergence problem. Since only Divergents can open the box, she orders that all of them be captured.

Divergent Beatrice "Tris" Prior, her boyfriend Four, brother Caleb, and Dauntless troublemaker Peter hide in the Amity compound led by Johanna Reyes. Eric tests the occupants for Divergence. Peter reveals their location as the others escape on a train to Factionless territory. Four discloses to the Factionless that his real name is Tobias Eaton, son of leader Evelyn, whom he resents for leaving him with abusive father Marcus. At the Factionless compound, Evelyn proposes a Dauntless-Factionless alliance against Erudite, but Four declines.

The following day, the three leave for Candor to meet up with the remaining Dauntless who were given shelter there, including Tori and Tris's best friend, Christina. During the trek, a disheartened Caleb splits from the group. Upon arrival, Tris and Four are arrested and brought before Candor leader Jack Kang, who intends to deliver them to Jeanine. However, Four pleads for a trial using Candor's truth serum. The serum reveals the real events, and they are absolved, but Tris tearfully admits to killing Christina's lover, Will, which angers her.

The Dauntless, aligned with Jeanine, attacks Candor, injuring many with metal disks. Max and Eric capture Tris, revealing that she has a Divergent reading of 100%, making her ideal to open the box. Four saves Tris and kills Eric. Meanwhile, Jeanine, frustrated by the failed Divergent subjects in the simulations, is approached by Peter, who suggests exploiting Tris's selfless Abnegation upbringing to reach her.

Back at the Factionless base, Four reluctantly agrees with Evelyn that war is inevitable. Jeanine activates the disks, a mind control device that causes Christina and her friends, Marlene and Hector, to walk robotically towards a ledge and ask for Tris's surrender. Tris and Tori manage to grab Christina and Hector in time, but Marlene plunges to her death. Overcome by guilt, Tris decides to turn herself over to Jeanine.

At the Erudite headquarters, Tris threatens to kill herself rather than comply, but she is stopped by the presence of Caleb, who is fully committed to Erudite. Tris agrees to undergo the trials if the suicides cease. Under Jeanine, Caleb, and Peter's watch, Tris overcomes the first four simulations before she requires rest.

The next day, after discovering that Four was captured while he tried to rescue her, Tris fails the Amity trial, and her vital signs cease, shocking Jeanine. Peter takes her body to Four, reveals he faked her death, and assists him in overpowering the guards. Tris is now determined to unveil the box's message, so with Peter's help, they return to the simulation room. She successfully opens the box in front of everyone. A hologram explains that the walled city and the faction system were part of an experiment, with the Divergents as its ultimate goal. The world is waiting outside for them to rejoin it.

Realizing she has lost, Jeanine orders the box buried and Four and Tris executed. However, the Factionless burst in, incapacitate Max, and rescue them. Jeanine and Caleb are arrested, and the message is broadcast citywide. Celebrated as a hero, Tris is eager to explore the outside world. In her cell, Jeanine wonders about life beyond the wall. Evelyn tells her she will never know and kills her.

== Cast ==
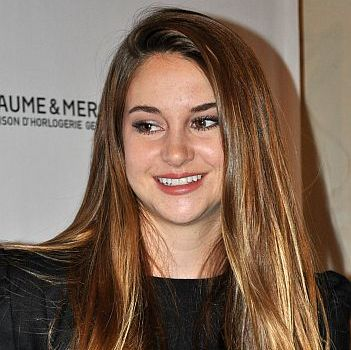
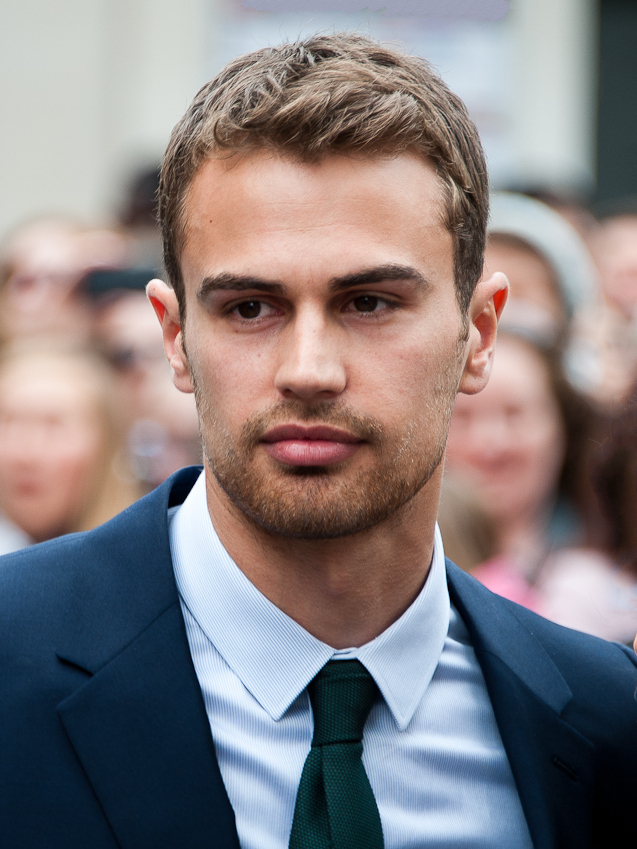
Shailene Woodley (left) and Theo James (right), who play the lead roles in the film
- Shailene Woodley as Beatrice "Tris" Prior, a 17-year old Divergent fugitive on the run
- Theo James as Tobias "Four" Eaton, a Divergent, former Dauntless member, and boyfriend of Tris
- Kate Winslet as Jeanine Matthews, the cruel leader of Erudite who has the Divergents hunted down
- Miles Teller as Peter Hayes
- Ansel Elgort as Caleb Prior, Tris' brother who sides with Jeanine
- Jai Courtney as Eric Coulter, the ruthless leader of Dauntless and one of Jeanine's right-hand men
- Octavia Spencer as Johanna Reyes, the leader of Amity
- Ray Stevenson as Marcus Eaton, the leader of Abnegation and Four's abusive father
- Zoë Kravitz as Christina, Tris' best friend and a former Dauntless member
- Maggie Q as Tori Wu
- Mekhi Phifer as Max
- Janet McTeer as Edith Prior, the ancestor of Tris' father Andrew who appears in a holographic message
- Daniel Dae Kim as Jack Kang, the leader of Candor
- Naomi Watts as Evelyn Johnson-Eaton, the leader of Factionless and the mother of Four
- Emjay Anthony as Hector
- Keiynan Lonsdale as Uriah Pedrad
- Rosa Salazar as Lynn
- Suki Waterhouse as Marlene
- Jonny Weston as Edgar
- Tony Goldwyn as Andrew Prior, Tris' deceased father who is in Jeanine's simulation Tris undergoes
- Ashley Judd as Natalie Prior, Tris' deceased mother who is in Jeanine's simulation Tris undergoes

== Production ==
=== Pre-production ===
In December 2013, Summit Entertainment announced that a film adaptation of Insurgent would be released as The Divergent Series: Insurgent on March 20, 2015, as a sequel to the film adaptation of Divergent with Brian Duffield originally chosen to write the script for the film. On December 16, 2013, it was announced that Neil Burger, director of Divergent, would not return to direct Insurgent, due to him still working on the first film. On February 13, 2014, it was announced that Robert Schwentke was offered the director position for the film and that Akiva Goldsman had been hired to re-write Duffield's script.

=== Casting ===
In March 2014, it was confirmed that Shailene Woodley, Theo James, Jai Courtney, Ansel Elgort, Ray Stevenson, Zoë Kravitz, Miles Teller, Maggie Q, Mekhi Phifer, and Kate Winslet would reprise their roles from Divergent. Additionally, Ashley Judd, whose character died in the previous film, joined the cast for flashback and dream scenes involving her character. Woodley, who was filming The Fault in Our Stars at the time, cut her hair in order to appear in both films.

On May 12, 2014, it was announced that Octavia Spencer joined the cast as Amity representative Johanna Reyes. Late May 2014, Suki Waterhouse and Jonny Weston were cast as Marlene and Edgar, respectively. The character of Edgar does not appear in the Divergent trilogy; Weston later confirmed that the character is a member of factionless. Early June 2014, Stephanie Leigh Schlund announced that she was cast in the film as a member of the Amity, although she did not appear in the finished film. Naomi Watts and Daniel Dae Kim joined the cast as Evelyn Johnson and Jack Kang. On June 9, 2014, Rosa Salazar joined the cast as Lynn. On June 10, 2014, Australian actor Keiynan Lonsdale joined the cast as Uriah. On June 11, 2014, Emjay Anthony joined the cast as Hector.

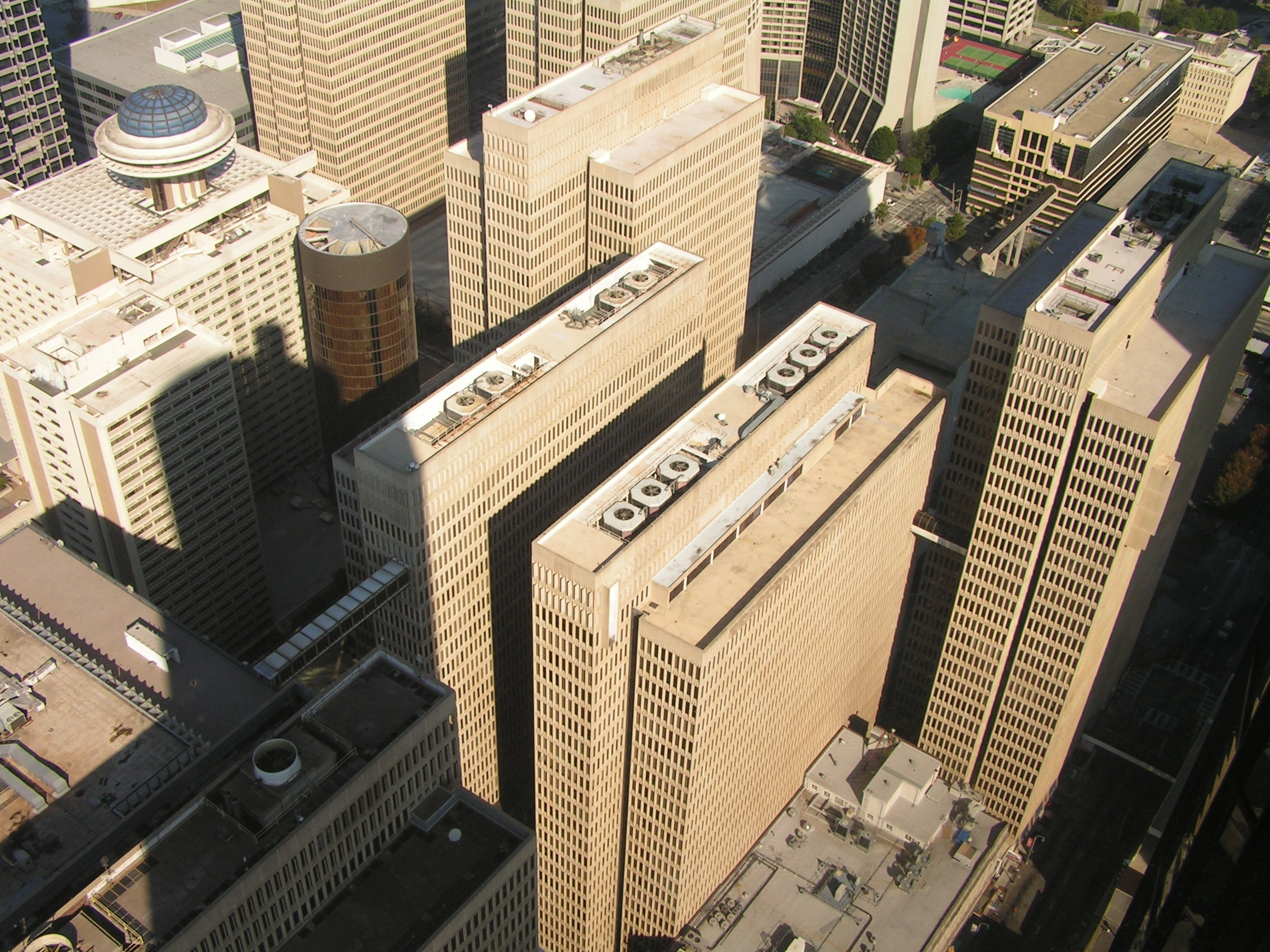
The zip-line scene in Insurgent was filmed at the roof of Peachtree Center.

=== Filming ===
Filming began in Atlanta on May 27, 2014, and concluded on September 6, 2014. Filming took place at the United States Penitentiary, Atlanta. For the Amity Compound, a set was constructed at Serenbe Community south of Atlanta. From June 11–24, 2014, filming took place at Peachtree Street, downtown Atlanta including a zip-line scene for which a set was constructed on the roof of Peachtree Center. On June 27, scenes were shot at the Archives Building in Atlanta. From July 12–13, 2014, production took place in Chicago with scenes being filmed at Wells Street, Franklin Street, Adams Street, Van Buren Street and helicopter shots at the Chicago Loop. Ashley Judd filmed her scenes along with Woodley in late June 2014. Additional interior and exterior shots of the High Museum in Atlanta were used as well.

In late August to early September, filming again moved to Atlanta. From August 28–29 and September 2–6, 2014, more scenes were filmed at the Archives Building in Atlanta. Some scenes were re-shot including the train sequence, which was filmed in Fulton County, Georgia on September 3, 2014. A few scenes were re-shot in Atlanta from December 17–21, 2014.

== Music ==
In November 2014, it was announced that composer Joseph Trapanese would score the film. Instead of a song-based soundtrack, the film relied on the score, which is darker and more intense than the first one. The Divergent Series: Insurgent – Original Motion Picture Soundtrack album was released March 17, 2015. The first single, "Holes in the Sky" by M83 featuring Haim, was released on March 2, 2015.

== Release ==
The Divergent Series: Insurgent was released on March 20, 2015, in the United States in 2D, Digital 3D, RealD 3D, and IMAX 3D. It is the first film of the series to be released in 3D formats and the second film in the franchise to be released in IMAX following the first film.

=== Marketing ===
On October 22, 2014, after a few clues were given on the official Instagram page, www.thedivergentseries.com was launched. On October 28, 2014, 3D interactive character posters of Ansel Elgort as Caleb Prior, Maggie Q as Tori, Keiynan Lonsdale as Uriah Pedrad, Mekhi Phifer as Max, Miles Teller as Peter Hayes, Zoë Kravitz as Christina, Theo James as Tobias "Four" Eaton, and Shailene Woodley as Beatrice "Tris" Prior were released by various media sites.

The teaser trailer for The Divergent Series: Insurgent officially debuted online through the film's official YouTube account on November 12, 2014. The official full-length trailer premiered on December 12, 2014. On January 22, 2015, another five 3D interactive character posters were released, featuring Woodley, James, Kate Winslet, Octavia Spencer and Naomi Watts. The first clip from the film was released on February 18, 2015, and a second clip was released three days later. The final trailer was released on February 24, 2015.

=== Home video ===
The Divergent Series: Insurgent was released on Digital HD on July 21, 2015, and on August 4, 2015, on 3D/Blu-ray/DVD.

== Reception ==
=== Box office ===
Insurgent earned $130.2 million in North America, and $166.8 million in other territories, for a worldwide total of $297 million. Insurgent made less in North America in comparison to Divergent with $130 million over $150 million but more worldwide with $297 million over $288 million partially due to a 3D conversion.

The Divergent Series: Insurgent earned $4.1 million from Thursday late night shows, which is lower than its predecessor's $4.9 million late night gross. It opened Friday, March 20, 2015, across 3,875 theaters, and earned $21.3 million, which was lower than its predecessor's opening day of $22.8 million. In total, it earned $52,263,680 for its debut weekend, finishing first at the box office, of which $3.6 million (7% of the total gross) came from 356 IMAX theaters. This was about the same opening gross as the first film, which made $54.6 million on the same weekend the year before.

Insurgent was released in a total of 82 countries internationally. Outside the US and Canada, Insurgent opened Thursday, March 19, 2015, in 52 countries earning $8.2 million, where it debuted at number one in 49 of the 52 countries. It opened in 20 more countries on March 21, for a total of 72 countries, earning $39.7 million in two days. Through Sunday, March 22, it earned an opening-weekend total of $48.3 million from 76 countries, where it debuted at No. 1 in 63 countries as well as topping the overseas box office for one weekend.

Its largest openings occurred in France ($6 million), the UK, Ireland and Malta ($4.4 million), Brazil ($4.2 million), Mexico ($3.7 million) and Australia ($3.2 million). In China, the film opened during the Dragon Boat Festival holiday weekend on June 19–21, 2015 and grossed $9.14 million in three days (Friday-Sunday) and $11.7 million in four days (Friday-Monday), which nearly equals the entire run of Divergent in the market ($12.4 million). It debuted at third place behind Jurassic World and SPL II: A Time For Consequences. France is the biggest market in terms of total earnings with $16.9 million followed by Brazil ($12.3 million), the United Kingdom and Ireland ($11.9 million) and Russia ($9.5 million).

=== Critical response ===
On review aggregator Rotten Tomatoes the film has a rating of 29%, based on 207 reviews, with an average rating of 5.00/10. The website's critical consensus reads, "Shailene Woodley gives it her all, but Insurgent is still a resounding step back for a franchise struggling to distinguish itself from the dystopian YA crowd." On Metacritic, the film has a weighted average score of 42 out of 100, based on 40 critics, indicating "mixed or average" reviews. Audience polled by CinemaScore, gave the film a grade "A−" on an A+ to F scale.

Many critics praised Shailene Woodley's performance, as well as some of the main cast. Writing for New England Movies Weekly Daniel M. Kimmel said, "Woodley does solid work here as she's done elsewhere, and continues to be someone to watch." Susan Wloszczyna of RogerEbert.com wrote, "Woodley herself almost single-handedly saves these films from being just another overwrought dystopian nightmare." Some critics have considered the film to be an improvement over its predecessor, with Kevin P. Sullivan of Entertainment Weekly writing that, "Taken for what it is, Insurgent is a vast improvement over the franchise's first installment, mostly thanks to expansion in two arenas: budget and scope," and Kenneth Turan of the Los Angeles Times calling it "A more effective, adult-friendly film than its predecessor." However, Insurgent still received a considerable amount of negative criticism; Richard Corliss of Time said that "With its repeat itinerary, Insurgent is less a sequel than a remake. The movie has an ordinary middle-chapter scenario, and less The Empire Strikes Back than Attack of the Clones." Joe Morgenstern of The Wall Street Journal felt that "Insurgent opens new horizons of repetitiveness, dramatic shapelessness, self-seriousness and a generalized oppressiveness."

Tom Russo of The Boston Globe gave the film a positive review, calling it "a sequel that sticks to more routine territory of action, angst, and dystopian gloom — mostly a sound approach, thanks to the consistent strength of franchise lead Shailene Woodley and a mix of intended and inadvertent surprises." Tom Long of The Detroit News gave the film a B− and wrote, "The action sequences are well done, some of the visuals are spectacular, and at its heart Insurgent is wrestling with some very basic questions about ambition and human interaction." Charles Koplinski of the Illinois Times called it, "Smart, Slick and Superior to its predecessor," and Rich Cline of Contactmusic.com called it "A sharp improvement on the original," and wrote "this second entry in The Divergent Series has a much stronger sense of its premise and characters."

Mara Reinstein of Us Weekly gave it a 2/4, saying that there are "Trainloads of action abound (literally), but it's essentially generic combat." Claudia Puig of USA Today judged, "This second installment, based on Veronica Roth's series of YA novels, feels cobbled together and less focused than 2014's Divergent, and lacks tension and excitement." Michael O'Sullivan of The Washington Post criticized the supporting characters writing that, "many of the other characters here are, by definition, one-dimensional." Sheri Linden of The Hollywood Reporter said, "Even with breathless chases, strong design components and dazzling effects, the story's organizing principle — the faction system that divides society into five groups based on personality — grows less compelling as Insurgent proceeds."

=== Accolades ===
Award	Category	Recipient(s)	Result	Ref.
MTV Movie Awards	Best Hero	Shailene Woodley	Nominated	
Teen Choice Awards	Choice Movie: Action		Nominated	
Teen Choice Awards	Choice Movie Actor: Action	Ansel Elgort	Nominated	
Teen Choice Awards	Choice Movie Actor: Action	Theo James	Nominated	
Teen Choice Awards	Choice Movie Actress: Action	Shailene Woodley	Won	
Teen Choice Awards	Choice Movie: Villain	Kate Winslet	Nominated	
Teen Choice Awards	Choice Movie: Liplock	Shailene Woodley and Theo James	Won	
Teen Choice Awards	Choice Movie: Scene Stealer	Miles Teller	Nominated	
People's Choice Awards	Favorite Action Movie		Nominated	
People's Choice Awards	Favorite Action Movie Actress	Shailene Woodley	Won	

== Sequel ==
On April 11, 2014, Summit Entertainment announced that a two-part film based on the final book in the Divergent trilogy, Allegiant, would be made. The first part, The Divergent Series: Allegiant, would be due for release on March 18, 2016, while the second part, The Divergent Series: Ascendant, would be released on June 9, 2017. Shailene Woodley, Theo James, and Naomi Watts would reprise their roles. On December 5, 2014, it was announced that Robert Schwentke would return to direct Part 1. Principal photography for Allegiant began in Atlanta on May 18, 2015, and concluded on August 23, 2015. On September 10, 2015, it was announced that the two films would be re-titled, with Part 1 being renamed as The Divergent Series: Allegiant and Part 2 as The Divergent Series: Ascendant. On February 29, 2016, it was announced that Lee Toland Krieger will serve as the director for Ascendant after Robert Schwentke backed out. On July 20, 2016, it was announced that Ascendant was put on hold due to Lionsgate's decision to release it as a TV movie, mainly due to the third movie Allegiant underperforming. In December 2018, it was announced that the television movie was cancelled due to the lack of interest of the cast and network executives.
