= RV (film) =

2006 film by Barry Sonnenfeld

- Theatrical release poster
- Directed by: Barry Sonnenfeld
- Written by: Geoff Rodkey
- Produced by: Lucy Fisher; Douglas Wick
- Starring: Robin Williams; Jeff Daniels; Cheryl Hines; Kristin Chenoweth; Joanna "JoJo" Levesque; Josh Hutcherson
- Cinematography: Fred Murphy
- Edited by: Kevin Tent
- Music by: James Newton Howard
- Production companies: Columbia Pictures; Relativity Media; Intermedia; Red Wagon Entertainment
- Distributed by: Sony Pictures Releasing
- Release date: April 28, 2006
- Running time: 99 minutes
- Countries: Germany; United States
- Language: English
- Budget: $50 million
- Box office: $87.5 million

RV (also known as RV - Runaway Vacation or Runaway Vacation) is a 2006 road comedy film directed by Barry Sonnenfeld, produced by Lucy Fisher and Douglas Wick, written by Geoff Rodkey and starring Robin Williams, with Jeff Daniels, Cheryl Hines, Kristin Chenoweth, Will Arnett, Joanna "JoJo" Levesque, and Josh Hutcherson. It follows a beverage company executive and his dysfunctional family who rent an RV for a road trip from Los Angeles to the Colorado Rockies, where they ultimately have to contend with a bizarre community of campers.

The film was produced by Columbia Pictures, Relativity Media, Intermedia and Red Wagon Entertainment. It was released in the United States by Sony Pictures Releasing on April 28, 2006, and was negatively received by critics, but grossed $87.5 million worldwide against a $50 million budget.

== Plot ==
Bob Munro, an executive at the large soda company Pure Vibe, struggles with the whims of his self-absorbed boss Todd Mallory. His family — materialistic wife Jamie and their teenage children, sharp-tongued Cassie and self-confident Carl — are also demanding, and he had promised them a vacation in Hawaii. During an event Todd hosted, Cassie's friend Gretchen insults Todd and stains his suit with a soda. Todd, who sought to acquire the Alpine Soda company in Boulder, Colorado, blames Bob for the incident and threatens to fire him if he does not promote the takeover. Todd's demand forces the Munros to cancel their vacation. Bob, concealing the real reason for not going to Hawaii, rents an RV and tells his family that they are traveling to the Rockies; he plans to make a detour in Colorado to secretly attend the meeting in Boulder.

The trip is marked by numerous mishaps. Bob's inexperience in handling the large vehicle results in him colliding with various obstacles and damaging the parking brake. During a stopover in Nevada, he must fix an unsavory clog in the toilet tank. The family also fumigates the RV with stink bombs to drive out intrusive raccoons. During the trip, the Munros have several encounters with the Gornickes, a good-natured but exhausting family who live in their own RV, consisting of dad Travis, mobile sales rep and cosmetologist mom Mary Jo, and their three children, Earl, Moon, and Billy.

As they approach Colorado, Carl tries playing basketball with some older boys, but Bob makes it awkward and embarrasses him. The two go for a walk in the woods and somehow bond over the future of Carl's heavyweight career. Later, the Munros reconnect as a family and enjoy the beauty of their surroundings. Nearing Boulder, Bob fakes an upset stomach and sends the rest of the family on a hike before meeting with the Alpine Soda owners. The meeting is promising, but on the way back, Bob gets stuck in a traffic jam, forcing him to take the RV through a treacherous four-wheel-drive trail; he returns to his family with a badly battered vehicle.

Todd calls Bob and demands that he return the next day to repeat the presentation to the entire Alpine Soda staff. However, the RV's parking brake fails again and sends it rolling into a mountain lake. Bob is forced to confess the true purpose of the trip to his family, explaining that he fears losing his job and their standard of living. Taken aback, the family refuses to accompany him, leaving him to make his way to the meeting alone on a bike recovered from the RV. The Gornickes appear and pick up the Munros. Along the way, the two families bond; Bob spots them together from a distance on the road. Deciding his family is more important than his job, he catches up to them and reconciles with everyone. In return, the Gornickes drive him the rest of the way to the meeting.

At the Alpine Soda headquarters, Bob begins to pitch the takeover to the staff; halfway through, he has an epiphany and encourages their independence, aware that Todd would ruin the brand. In retaliation, Todd fires Bob; Carl angrily throws to the ground and tackles him, making him a hero. Then Bob retorts that he quits anyway. On their way home in the sodden and battered RV, the Munros are stopped by a police officer on behalf of the Alpine Soda owners, who offer Bob a job overseeing their company's expansion. The RV's parking brake fails again, flattening the police car and the Alpine Soda company owners' car.

During the credits, the two families are shown dancing and singing along to "Route 66".

== Cast ==
- Robin Williams as Robert "Bob" Munro, an executive at Pure Vibe
- Jeff Daniels as Travis Gornicke, the patriarch of the Gornicke family
- Cheryl Hines as Jamie Munro, Bob's wife
- Kristin Chenoweth as Mary Jo Gornicke, Travis's wife
- Joanna "JoJo" Levesque as Cassie Munro, Bob and Jamie's 15-year-old daughter
  - Erika-Shaye Gair as 5-year-old Cassie Munro
- Josh Hutcherson as Carl Munro, Bob and Jamie's 12-year-old son
  - Catherine Rose Young as baby Carl Munro (uncredited)
- Will Arnett as Todd Mallory, the CEO of Pure Vibe and Bob's self-absorbed boss
- Hunter Parrish as Earl Gornicke, Travis and Mary Jo's 18-year old teenage son
- Brendan Fletcher as Howie, an incompetent man who helps Bob with his RV's clogged bilge system
- Rob LaBelle as Larry Moiphine, the co-owner of Alpine Soda and Garry's younger brother
- Brian Markinson as Garry Moiphine, the co-owner of Alpine Soda and Larry's older brother
- Chloe Sonnenfeld as Moon Gornicke, Travis and Mary Jo's 12-year-old daughter
- Alex Ferris as Billy Gornicke, Travis and Mary Jo's 8-year-old son
- Tony Hale as Frank, Bob's co-worker at Pure Vibe
- Brian Howe as Marty, a hitchhiking guitarist
- Richard Cox as Laird, a Pure Vibe worker who Todd is training to succeed Bob
- Veronika Sztopa as Gretchen, Cassie's militaristic friend
- Kirsten Alter as Tammy
- Matthew Gray Gubler as Joseph "Joe Joe", an incompetent man who helps Bob with his RV's clogged bilge system
- Stephen E. Miller as Organ Stew Guy
- Malcolm Scott as Kenny
- Deborah DeMille as an RV Dump Lady
- Chad Krowchuk as a Scruffy Teenager
- Ty Olsson as a Diablo Pass Officer
- Bruce McFee as Sam, a police officer at Independence Pass who is enlisted by the Moiphine brothers to help catch up to the Munros
- Giacomo Baessato, Justin Chartier, and Andrew Botz as Hip Hop Wannabes who Bob catches picking on Carl
- Barry Sonnenfeld as Irv, a dodgy RV dealer
- Diane Michelle as the voice of the RV GPS (uncredited)

== Production ==
The film began principal photography in the Vancouver area and southern Alberta on May 25, 2005, and finished filming the following August.

== Soundtrack ==
The score was written by James Newton Howard and features several members of Lyle Lovett's band: Matt Rollings (keyboards), Russ Kunkel (drums), Ray Herndon (guitar), Viktor Krauss (bass) and Buck Reid (pedal steel). Alvin Chea, vocalist from Take 6, provided solo vocals. Additional music was provided by Stuart Michael Thomas and Blake Neely. Several songs were featured prominently in the film, including "GTO", "Route 66", "Cherry Bomb" and "Stand by Your Man".

== Release ==
RV was theatrically released in North America on April 28, 2006, by Columbia Pictures. The film was also released on UMD, DVD and Blu-ray on August 15, 2006, by Sony Pictures Home Entertainment.

The film grossed $71.7 million in North America and $15.8 million in other territories, for a total gross of $87.5 million, against a production budget of $50 million. In its opening weekend, it finished number one at the box office, with $16.4 million in 3,639 theaters.

== Reception ==
=== Critical response ===
On Rotten Tomatoes, the film has an approval percentage of 23% based on 121 reviews, with the critics consensus reading: "An unoriginal and only occasionally funny family road-trip movie, RV is a mediocre effort that not even the charisma of Robin Williams can save." On Metacritic, the film has a score of 33 out of 100 based on 28 critic reviews, meaning "Generally Unfavorable". Audiences polled by CinemaScore gave the film an average grade of "B+" on an A+ to F scale.

Justin Chang of Variety said, "RV works up an ingratiating sweetness that partially compensates for its blunt predictability and meager laughs."

Roger Ebert, writing for the Chicago Sun-Times, gave the film two stars out of four. He wrote, "There is nothing I much disliked but little to really recommend."

=== Accolades ===
Award	Category	Nominee	Result
Golden Raspberry Award	Worst Excuse for Family Entertainment		Won
Golden Raspberry Award	Worst Supporting Actress	Kristin Chenoweth	Nominated
Young Artist Award	Best Performance in a Feature Film - Leading Young Actor	Josh Hutcherson	Nominated

== See also ==
- The Long Long Trailer
