= Lucy Fisher =

American film producer

- Born: October 2, 1949 (age 77); Englewood, New Jersey, U.S.
- Education: Harvard University (1971)
- Occupation: Film producer
- Years active: 2002–present
- Spouse: Douglas Wick (m. 1986)
- Children: 3

Lucy Fisher (born October 2, 1949) is an American film producer. She was previously Vice Chairman of the Columbia TriStar Motion Picture Group at Sony Studios, Executive Vice President of Worldwide Production at Warner Brothers, Head of Production at Zoetrope Studios and Vice President of Production at Twentieth Century Fox. She was described by actor Jack Nicholson as "this casually brilliant vice chairperson of Sony Pictures. The executive that no one flees at parties."

Along with her partner and husband Douglas Wick, she is co-head of Red Wagon Entertainment. Fisher and Red Wagon's most recent production was The Divergent Series, based on Veronica Roth's New York Times bestselling books. Divergent starred a cast of stellar newcomers including Shailene Woodley, Theo James, Miles Teller and Ansel Elgort, as well as Oscar-winner Kate Winslet. It was followed by the sequels Insurgent and Allegiant, which also stars Naomi Watts and Jeff Daniels. Previously, Fisher and Wick produced The Great Gatsby, which won two Academy Awards, was directed by Baz Luhrmann and starred Leonardo DiCaprio, as well as Memoirs of a Geisha, which won three Academy Awards.

== Early life and career ==
Fisher grew up in Englewood, New Jersey. Fisher graduated from Dwight-Englewood School in 1967 and received the school's Distinguished Alumni Award in 1997. She attended Harvard University (1971) where she graduated cum laude with a degree in English. After graduation, Fisher moved to Los Angeles, where she began her career as a freelance script reader at United Artists. Fisher continued to work her way up the ladder, as an executive story editor for MGM, and as a vice president at 20th Century Fox, before being hand-picked as head of production by Francis Ford Coppola for his Zoetrope Studios.

In 1981, Fisher began a 14-year tenure at Warner Brothers as executive vice president of Worldwide Production, where she developed and supervised a diverse range of films, including Twilight Zone: The Movie, The Fugitive, The Color Purple, Gremlins, The Goonies, Malcolm X, Space Jam, Empire of the Sun, The Outsiders, The Bridges of Madison County, The Secret Garden, and The Witches of Eastwick. In 1995, Fisher joined Sony and moved to Columbia TriStar, where she worked as vice chairman During Fisher¹s tenure as vice chairman at Sony, the studio broke all-time industry records for biggest domestic and worldwide grosses with films she supervised, which included Men in Black, My Best Friend's Wedding, Air Force One, Jerry Maguire, As Good As It Gets, and Stuart Little.

In 2000, Fisher announced she would be leaving Sony to join her husband, Doug Wick, as co-head of their production company, Red Wagon Entertainment. Together, they produced a wide range of critically acclaimed and popular movies, including Jarhead, Peter Pan, RV, Stuart Little 2, and Lawless.

In June 2018 she was named co-president of the Producers Guild of America, alongside Gail Berman.

== Personal life ==
Fisher's boyfriend, musician and television host Peter Ivers was murdered in downtown Los Angeles in early 1983. Fisher has been married to producer Douglas Wick since 1986. They have three daughters: Sarah Wick, Julia Wick and Tessa Wick.

== Philanthropy and causes ==
In addition to her work in the film industry, Fisher has been involved with several philanthropical causes. Fisher served as a member of the Harvard Board of Overseers, and as Vice Chairman of the Overseers' Executive Committee, as well as an advisor to the Harvard Office of the Arts. Fisher also founded the Peter Ivers Artist in Residency at Harvard, which has funded burgeoning artists since 1983. After their youngest daughter Tessa was diagnosed with juvenile diabetes, Fisher and Wick co-founded CuresNow, an organization that promotes regenerative medicine and stem cell research. Fisher was a co-chair of the California Stem Cell Research and Cures Act (Proposition 71), which legislation passed by a wide margin in 2004. The successful stem cell initiative now awards $3 billion for stem cell research in California. Fisher is widely considered a pioneer for women and working mothers in the entertainment industry. She was the driving force behind the on-site Warner Bros. Studio Children's Center, which has since provided care for over 2000 children and served as a prototype for day care centers at other studios.

== Awards ==
Fisher's awards include the Crystal Award from Women in Film, the Hollywood Award for Outstanding Achievement in Producing, The Hollywood Film Festival 'Producer of the Year' Award, Producers Guild of America's Award, the John Harvard Award, Premiere Magazine's Icon Award, the Friends of Cancer Research Advocacy's 'Lifetime Achievement Award', and the David O. Selznick Achievement Award in Theatrical Motion Pictures. She has also been listed as one of Fortune magazine's 50 Most Powerful Women in American Business.

== Filmography ==
She was a producer in all films unless otherwise noted.

=== Film ===
Year	Film	Credit	Award	Notes
2002	Stuart Little 2			
2003	Peter Pan			
2004	Win a Date with Tad Hamilton!			
2005	Bewitched			
2005	Stuart Little 3: Call of the Wild			Direct-to-video
2005	Jarhead			
2005	Memoirs of a Geisha		Six Academy Award Nominations, three wins	
2006	RV			
2006	Hollow Man 2	Executive producer		Direct-to-video
2012	Lawless			
2013	The Great Gatsby		2 Academy Awards	
2014	Divergent			
2015	The Divergent Series: Insurgent			
2016	The Divergent Series: Allegiant			
2020	The Craft: Legacy			
2024	Gladiator II			

=== Television ===
Year	Title	Credit
2003	Stuart Little	Executive producer
2021–23	Joe Pickett	Executive producer
