= Keiynan Lonsdale =

Australian actor and singer

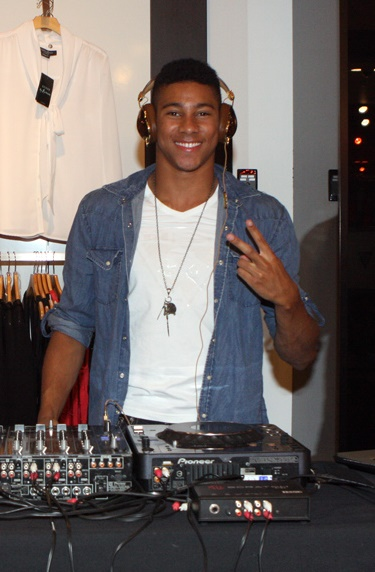
- Lonsdale at CLEO Bachelors in 2012
- Born: 19 December 1991 (age 34); Australia
- Occupations: Actor; dancer; singer-songwriter
- Years active: 2007–present
- Musical career
- Genres: Hip hop; pop; R&B

Keiynan Lonsdale (/ˈkiːnən/ KEE-nən; born 19 December 1991) is an Australian actor, dancer, and singer-songwriter. He is known for roles such as Oliver Lloyd in the ABC series Dance Academy (2012–2013), Wally West / Kid Flash in the CW series The Flash (2015–2023) and Legends of Tomorrow (2017–2018), and Abraham "Bram" Greenfeld in the film Love, Simon (2018). His other films include The Divergent Series: Insurgent (2015) and The Finest Hours (2016). Lonsdale has also worked as an MTV VJ and released original music recordings, including a studio album in 2020.

== Early life ==
Keiynan Lonsdale was born on 19 December 1991 in Australia. He is of Nigerian, Irish, and Danish descent, and has 11 siblings.

== Career ==
=== Acting ===
Lonsdale's first acting job was at age 16, with a dancing part in the film Razzle Dazzle: A Journey into Dance (2007). The following year, he appeared in an episode of the Australian medical drama series All Saints. He was also a recurring cast member on the Australian teen drama series Dance Academy's second season (2012) in the role of Oliver Lloyd, being added-on as a regular character for the show's third, and final, season.

He then played a supporting role as Uriah Pedrad in The Divergent Series: Insurgent (2015), the second film in the series, later briefly reprising the role in The Divergent Series: Allegiant (2016). In 2016, his single "Higher" was included on Connor Franta's curated album Common Culture, volume 5. He then appeared in the historical drama The Finest Hours (2016) as Eldon Hanon, the youngest sailor involved in a rescue-at-sea in 1952.

In 2015, Lonsdale auditioned for the role of Jefferson Jackson for The CW's Arrow, but the role was given to Franz Drameh. Instead, he was cast as Wally West (the previously unknown son of Joe West) on CW's The Flash and became a regular supporting character on season two, and as Kid Flash on season three. In 2017, the character left The Flash and debuted on season three of Legends of Tomorrow. That year, Lonsdale also appeared in an episode of Supergirl.

In 2018, Lonsdale played Bram in the film Love, Simon, based on Becky Albertalli's novel Simon vs. the Homo Sapiens Agenda, about a teenage boy who struggles to come out. Lonsdale later said the role helped him come to terms with his own sexuality. The film received positive reviews from critics, and was dubbed historically significant, as it was the first film ever released by a major studio to focus on a gay teenage romance.

In 2019, Lonsdale starred in Camila Cabello's music video for "Liar".

On 19 June 2025, Lonsdale was announced in the cast for a yet to be titled Postcard Bandit series for Foxtel. RUN premiered in Australia on Binge on 1 January 2026, with Lonsdale playing Detective Gary Porter in pursuit of the infamous 'Postcard Bandit'.

=== Music ===
After Dance Academy in 2012, Lonsdale was a VJ on MTV Australia and New Zealand for just under three years. He recorded and released a single on iTunes, "One and Only", in 2014.

He has released several singles, including "Higher" (2015), "Good Life" (2017), "Kiss the Boy" (2018), "Preach" (2018), and "Rainbow Dragon" (2019). He released "Lonely Point of View" in 2023.

Lonsdale's music covers a variety of genres, including pop, and R&B

== Personal life ==
In 2017, Lonsdale came out on Instagram saying "I like girls, & I like guys", not identifying with a specific term or sexuality label. He later came out as gay in a 2022 interview with BuzzFeed.

== Discography ==
=== Studio albums ===
Title	Album details
Rainbow Boy	Released: 29 May 2020; Format: Digital download, streaming
Heart Defence Mixtape	Released: 8 December 2023; Format: Digital download, streaming

=== Extended plays ===
Title	EP details
Higher Vol. 1	Released: 6 October 2015; Format: Digital download
3rd Eye (with Intyce and Invadea)	Released: 19 December 2021; Label: InvadeAvision; Format: Digital download, streaming

=== Singles ===
List of singles, showing year released and album name
Title	Year	Album
"One and Only"	2014	Non-album single
"Higher"	2015	Higher Vol. 1
"Good Life"	2017	Non-album singles
"Kiss the Boy"	2018	Non-album singles
"Preach"	2018	Non-album singles
"Rainbow Dragon"	2019	Rainbow Boy
"Gay Street Fighter"	2020	Rainbow Boy
"See You There" (with Castelle)	2020	Non-album single
"Rhythm & Music"	2021	Rainbow Boy
"Gods of the Disco"	2021	Non-album singles
"Better" (with Gimme Gimme)	2022	Non-album singles
"Lonely Point of View"	2022	Non-album singles
"Lessons"	2023	Heart Defence Mixtape
"Come Papi"	2023	Heart Defence Mixtape

== Filmography ==
Film
Year	Title	Role	Notes
2007	Razzle Dazzle: A Journey into Dance	Miss Elizabeth's Dance Troupe	
2015	The Divergent Series: Insurgent	Uriah Pedrad	
2016	The Finest Hours	Eldon Hanon	
2016	The Divergent Series: Allegiant	Uriah Pedrad	
2017	Dance Academy: The Movie	Oliver Lloyd	
2017	Like. Share. Follow.	Garrett	
2018	Love, Simon	Bram Greenfeld	
2020	Work It	Julliard Pembroke	
2022	My Fake Boyfriend	Drew	
2026	War Machine	60	
TBA	Weetzie Bat	Duck	

Television
Year	Title	Role	Network	Notes
2008	All Saints	Corey	Seven Network	Episode: "Sons and Lovers"
2012–2013	Dance Academy	Oliver Lloyd	ABC1	Recurring role (season 2); main role (season 3)
2015–2018, 2020, 2023	The Flash	Wally West / Kid Flash	The CW	Main role (seasons 2–4), special guest star (season 5–6, 9); 46 episodes
2017–2018	Legends of Tomorrow	Wally West / Kid Flash	The CW	Main cast (season 3); 9 episodes
2017	Supergirl	Wally West / Kid Flash	The CW	Episode: "Crisis on Earth-X, Part 1"
2018	RuPaul's Drag Race: All Stars 4	Self	VH1	Guest Judge; episode: "Snatch Game of Love"
2020	Love, Victor	Bram Greenfeld	Hulu	Guest star
2020	Equal	Bayard Rustin	HBO Max	Docuseries
2021	Eden	Cam	Stan	Main role
2022	Step Up	Tal Baker	Starz	Main cast (season 3)
2023	RuPaul's Drag Race Down Under	Self	Stan / TVNZ+	Guest Judge; Episode: "Snatch Game"
2024	Swift Street	Tom	SBS	TV series: 8 episodes
2026	RUN	Detective Gary Porter	Foxtel / Binge	TV series
2026	Drag Race Down Under vs. the World	Self	Stan	Guest Judge; Episode: "Rappin’ Roast"

== Awards and nominations ==
Year	Award	Category	Nominated work	Result	Ref.
2018	MTV Movie & TV Awards	Best Kiss (shared with Nick Robinson)	Love, Simon	Won	
2018	Teen Choice Awards	Choice Movie Ship (shared with Nick Robinson)	Love, Simon	Nominated	
2021	GLAAD Media Awards	Outstanding Breakthrough Music Artist	Rainbow Boy	Nominated	
