= Douglas Wick =

American film producer

- Born: United States
- Other names: Douglas Z. Wick; Doug Wick
- Occupation: Film producer
- Years active: 1979–present
- Spouse: Lucy Fisher (m. 1986)
- Children: 3

Douglas Wick is an American film producer whose work includes producing Gladiator, Stuart Little, and Memoirs of a Geisha.

== Life and career ==
Wick is the son of actress Mary Jane (Woods) and United States Information Agency director Charles Z. Wick. Following his cum laude graduation from Yale University, where he was a member of Wolf's Head Society, Douglas Wick began work for filmmaker Alan J. Pakula as his "coffee boy". In 1979, Wick would get his first film credit when he served as associate producer on Pakula's film Starting Over. Wick's first solo producing job came on the 1988 film Working Girl. His next film, Wolf, would reunite Wick with Mike Nichols, who directed Working Girl, before he went on to produce the 1996 film The Craft. The year of 1999 saw Wick produce both the critical-hit Girl, Interrupted and the box-office hit Stuart Little. The following year brought with it Wick's biggest success to date, Gladiator. This film would net Wick an Academy Award, a Golden Globe, and a BAFTA Award all for "Best Picture". Also in 2000 Wick produced the Sci Fi hit Hollow Man. In the next few years Wick would produce Spy Game, Peter Pan (the first live action version of the J.M. Barrie classic tale), a successful Stuart Little sequel Stuart Little 2, and Win a Date with Tad Hamilton!. In 2005, Wick produced two more critical hits, Jarhead and Memoirs of a Geisha as well as two lesser successes Bewitched and another Stuart Little sequel Stuart Little 3: Call of the Wild. Wick produced the moderate success of RV and a Hollow Man sequel Hollow Man 2 in 2006.

Wick and Red Wagon's most recent production was The Divergent Series, based on Veronica Roth's New York Times bestselling books. Divergent starred a cast of newcomers including Shailene Woodley, Theo James, Justin Marasigan, Miles Teller, and Ansel Elgort, as well as Oscar winner Kate Winslet. It was followed by the sequels Insurgent and Allegiant, which also stars Naomi Watts and Jeff Daniels. Previously, Fisher and Wick produced The Great Gatsby, directed by Baz Luhrmann and starring Leonardo DiCaprio, Tobey Maguire, and Carey Mulligan.

Wick has been married to Lucy Fisher since 1986, and together they have three daughters. Wick is also best friends with bluegrass musician Dave Rawlings and frequently visits him at his home in Nashville.

=== Red Wagon Entertainment ===
Red Wagon Entertainment
- Type: Private
- Industry: Entertainment
- Founded: 1990; 36 years ago
- Founder: Douglas Wick
- Headquarters: 8931 Ellis Avenue, Los Angeles, California, United States
- Key people: Douglas Wick; Lucy Fisher
- Products: Motion pictures
- Website: RedWagonEnt.com

Douglas Wick is the founder of Red Wagon Entertainment and Red Wagon Productions. The company was formed in 1990 with a first-look deal at Columbia Pictures, to develop film projects. In 1993, the deal was extended. In 2000, he expanded the company to bring in Lucy Fisher, his partner and wife. Red Wagon Productions has been the production company on fifteen of the films Wick has produced, including: Wolf, The Craft, Girl, Interrupted; Spy Game; and Memoirs of a Geisha.

== Filmography ==
He was a producer in all films unless otherwise noted.

=== Film ===
Year	Film	Credit	Notes
1979	Starting Over	Associate producer	
1988	Working Girl		
1994	Wolf		
1996	The Craft		
1998	Hush		
1999	Stuart Little		
1999	Girl, Interrupted		
2000	Gladiator		
2000	Hollow Man		
2001	Spy Game		
2002	Stuart Little 2		
2003	Peter Pan		
2004	Win a Date with Tad Hamilton!		
2005	Bewitched		
2005	Stuart Little 3: Call of the Wild		Direct-to-video
2005	Jarhead		
2005	Memoirs of a Geisha		
2006	RV		
2006	Hollow Man 2	Executive producer	Direct-to-video
2012	Lawless		
2013	The Great Gatsby		
2014	Divergent		
2015	The Divergent Series: Insurgent		
2016	The Divergent Series: Allegiant		
2020	The Craft: Legacy		
2024	Gladiator II		

As writer

Year	Film	Notes
2002	Stuart Little 2	
2005	Stuart Little 3: Call of the Wild	Direct-to-video

Miscellaneous crew

Year	Film	Role
1978	Comes a Horseman	Assistant to director

Thanks

Year	Film	Role
2010	How Do You Know	Special thanks
2019	Lost Holiday	Special thanks

=== Television ===
Year	Title	Credit
2003	Stuart Little	Executive producer
2021–2023	Joe Pickett	Executive producer

== Awards ==
Academy Awards

- Best Picture
  - 2000 Gladiator

Golden Globes

- Best Picture
  - 1988 Working Girl
  - 2000 Gladiator

BAFTA Awards

- Best Film
  - 2000 Gladiator

PGA Golden Laurel Awards

- Motion Picture Producer of the Year Award
  - 2000

NATO ShoWest Producer of the Year

- 2002
