= Emjay Anthony =

American actor and model

- Born: Emjay Anthony Salazar; June 1, 2003 (age 23); Clearwater, Florida, U.S.
- Occupations: Actor; model
- Years active: 2009–present

Emjay Anthony Salazar (born June 1, 2003) is an American actor and model. His major films include It's Complicated, Chef, Krampus, Replicas, and Bad Moms.

== Early life ==
Emjay Anthony Salazar was born on June 1, 2003, in Clearwater Beach, Florida, to parents Michael and Trisha Salazar. He has an older sister named Sage. He modeled as a young child and made his acting debut in a Werther's candy commercial at the age of four. When he was 5, he and his family relocated to California.

== Career ==
In 2009 Anthony made his film debut in It's Complicated starring Meryl Streep and Alec Baldwin. He returned to his school studies for a year and a half and then resumed auditioning for commercials and television films.

His breakout role was in the 2014 film Chef, as Percy, the son of the protagonist, chef Carl Casper.

After a break from acting, Anthony played a recurring role as Zeke Breem in Seasons 2 & 3 of Physical. In 2024, he played Dylan Campbell in the series Hysteria!

As of 2025, Anthony’s project Jilliahsmen Trinity: 2.9 - A.R.M is on development in a post-production.

== Filmography ==
Film
Year	Title	Role	Notes
2009	It's Complicated	Pedro Adler	
2013	No Ordinary Hero: The SuperDeafy Movie	Dean	
2014	Chef	Percy	
2015	The Divergent Series: Insurgent	Hector	
2015	Incarnate	Jake Ember	
2015	Krampus	Max Engel	
2016	Donald Trump's The Art of the Deal: The Movie	Kid 1	
2016	The Jungle Book	Wolf Pup (voice)	
2016	Bad Moms	Dylan Mitchell	
2017	A Bad Moms Christmas	Dylan Mitchell	
2018	Replicas	Matt Foster	
2023	The Kiss List	Liam	
TBA	Jilliahsmen Trinity: 2.9 - A.R.M †	TBA	Post-production
Television
Year	Title	Role	Notes
2012	Applebaum	Leo	TV movie
2012	Grey's Anatomy	Oliver Lefkowitz	Episode: "Run, Baby, Run"
2013	The Mentalist	Marvin Pettigrew	Episode: "Little Red Corvette"
2014	Rake	Adam Leon	6 episodes
N/A	Members Only	Evan	Cancelled
2020	Council of Dads	Theo Perry	Main role
2022-2023	Physical	Zeke Breem	Recurring role; seasons 2 and 3
2024	Hysteria!	Dylan Campbell	
