= The Divergent Series: Allegiant =

2016 film by Robert Schwentke

- Theatrical release poster
- Directed by: Robert Schwentke
- Screenplay by: Noah Oppenheim; Adam Cooper; Bill Collage
- Based on: Allegiant by Veronica Roth
- Produced by: Lucy Fisher; Pouya Shahbazian; Douglas Wick
- Starring: Shailene Woodley; Theo James; Jeff Daniels; Miles Teller; Ansel Elgort; Zoë Kravitz; Maggie Q; Ray Stevenson; Bill Skarsgård; Octavia Spencer; Naomi Watts
- Cinematography: Florian Ballhaus
- Edited by: Stuart Levy
- Music by: Joseph Trapanese
- Production companies: Summit Entertainment; Red Wagon Entertainment; Mandeville Films
- Distributed by: Lionsgate
- Release dates: March 8, 2016 (Bangkok); March 18, 2016 (United States)
- Running time: 121 minutes
- Country: United States
- Language: English
- Budget: $110–142 million
- Box office: $179 million

The Divergent Series: Allegiant (simply known as Allegiant) is a 2016 American dystopian film directed by Robert Schwentke with a screenplay by Bill Collage, Adam Cooper, and Noah Oppenheim. It is the third and final film in The Divergent Series. It was set to be the first of two cinematic parts based on the 2013 novel Allegiant of the Divergent trilogy by Veronica Roth (the second cinematic part was to be named Ascendant).

The film stars Shailene Woodley, Theo James, Jeff Daniels, Miles Teller, Ansel Elgort, Zoë Kravitz, Maggie Q, Ray Stevenson, Bill Skarsgård, Octavia Spencer, and Naomi Watts. Set in a post-apocalyptic and dystopian Chicago, the story follows Tris Prior, her boyfriend Four, and their small group of friends escaping over the wall that encloses the city. Once outside, they discover new truths that will shift their alliances and introduce new threats.

Principal photography primarily took place in Atlanta, Georgia, from May 2015 until August that same year. The film was initially titled The Divergent Series: Allegiant – Part 1. In September 2015, Part 1 was renamed Allegiant and Part 2 was renamed Ascendant. Allegiant was released on March 18, 2016 by Lionsgate under the Summit Entertainment label in theaters and IMAX. The film received generally negative reviews from critics, who criticized the visual effects, lack of originality, character development and the decision to split the film into two parts. The film was a box-office disappointment, grossing $179 million worldwide against its estimated budget of $110–142 million, making it the lowest-grossing film in The Divergent Series. Following budget cuts, a theatrical release of Ascendant was dropped in favor of reconfiguring the project as a TV film for Starz, to be followed by a spinoff series. Both projects were later canceled, effectively ending the franchise.

== Plot ==
Evelyn seals Chicago's wall and puts Jeanine's supporters on trial for plotting a coup. (Note: As depicted in The Divergent Series: Insurgent (2015)) Johanna rejects her rule and joins the newly formed Allegiants. Tris and Four rescue Caleb and escape over the wall into the wastelands with Tori, Christina, and Peter, pursued by Factionless guards led by Edgar, who kills Tori. The fugitives are rescued from Edgar by technologically advanced soldiers who take them to the Bureau of Genetic Welfare, a facility concealed behind a cloaking shield. Its leader, David, explains that attempts to eliminate human flaws through genetic engineering led to the devastating Purity Wars. The Bureau subsequently established experiments in isolated cities, including Chicago, to produce genetically pure individuals. Tris is the first to achieve the desired result.

While Caleb and Peter monitor Chicago, Christina and Four undergo military training. David shows Tris her mother's memories, revealing that she volunteered for the Chicago experiment after being rescued as a child. Learning of growing violence between the Allegiants and Factionless, Tris agrees to cooperate with David if he persuades the Bureau's council to intervene. During a mission to a wasteland settlement, Four discovers that the Bureau kidnaps children and erases their memories. He warns Tris, but she chooses to accompany David to the council while Four returns to Chicago. En route, Matthew reveals that David has ordered Four's death. Four kills his escorts, but their transport crashes. Matthew helps him escape through the cloaking shield and returns to warn Tris.

Tris tells the council that the Bureau's distinction between genetically pure and damaged people as no better than Chicago's faction system. She learns that David controls the Chicago experiment and intends to restore the factions. Breaking with him, she escapes with Caleb and Christina in David's hovercar, aided by Nita. Meanwhile, Four is captured by the Factionless and confronts Evelyn over the escalating violence. As the Allegiants attack Chicago, David recruits Peter to persuade Evelyn to release amnesia gas that will erase the population's memories and end the conflict. Evelyn agrees, but Four, Tris, and Christina reach the vault before the gas can be released. Four persuades his mother to abandon the plan, prompting Peter to shoot her in the leg. When gas begins flooding the vault, Peter realizes David has betrayed him and opens the doors, allowing the others to stop its release before fleeing.

Tris and Caleb destroy the gas distribution system and she broadcasts from atop the Erudite building, exposing the Bureau and revealing that Chicago was an experiment in genetic purity. As she declares the city free of the Bureau's control, Caleb detonates explosives aboard David's returning hovercar, disabling the cloaking shield and exposing the Bureau to the world.

== Cast ==
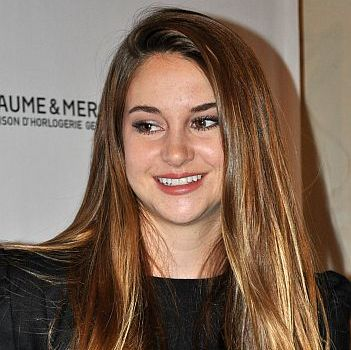
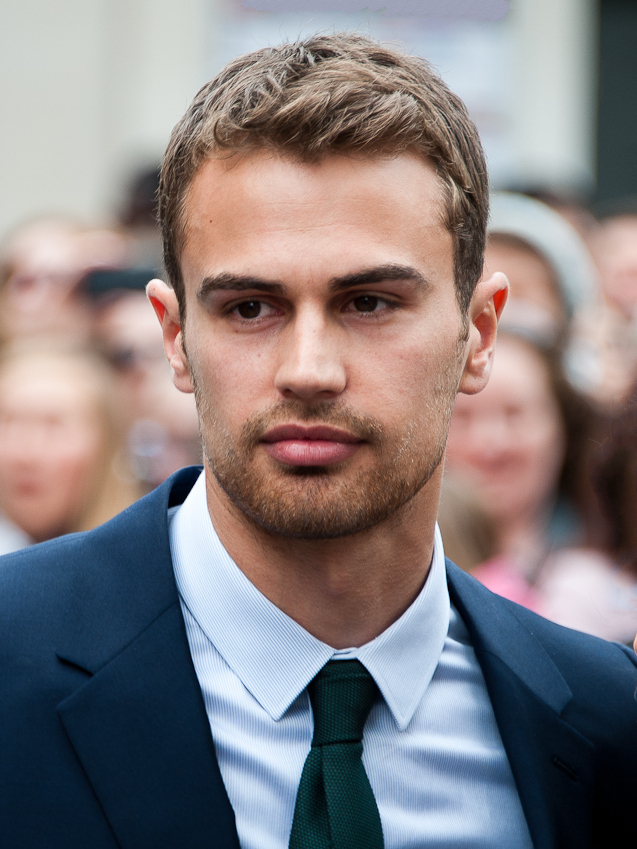
Shailene Woodley and Theo James play the lead roles in the film
- Shailene Woodley as Tris, a Divergent and former Dauntless member
- Theo James as Four, a former Dauntless instructor and Tris' boyfriend
- Jeff Daniels as David, head of the Bureau of Genetic Welfare, an advanced city formed outside of Chicago
- Miles Teller as Peter
- Ansel Elgort as Caleb, Tris' brother
- Zoë Kravitz as Christina, Tris' best friend
- Maggie Q as Tori, former Dauntless
- Ray Stevenson as Marcus
- Mekhi Phifer as Max, former Dauntless Leader
- Daniel Dae Kim as Jack Kang
- Bill Skarsgård as Matthew, a member of the Bureau of Genetic Welfare who later sides with Tris and Four
- Octavia Spencer as Johanna, former Amity Leader
- Naomi Watts as Evelyn, Four's mother and the leader of Factionless
- Rebecca Pidgeon as Sarah
- Xander Berkeley as Phillip
- Keiynan Lonsdale as Uriah
- Jonny Weston as Edgar, Evelyn's Factionless second in command
- Nadia Hilker as Nita
- Andy Bean as Romit
- Zeeko Zaki as Factionless Squad Leader

== Production ==
=== Development ===
Initially intended as a single film based on Allegiant, the producers of The Divergent Series later decided to adapt the novel into two films, similar to what has been done with other young adult novel series adapted into films. The two proposed films were originally titled Allegiant — Part One and Allegiant — Part Two; this was later dropped in favor of assigning the films unique names (Allegiant and Ascendant, respectively).

By March 2015, all of the series cast members had confirmed their involvement, with newcomers Jeff Daniels and Bill Skarsgård added to the cast that April and May, respectively.

=== Filming ===
Filming began on May 18, 2015, in Atlanta, Georgia, and concluded on August 23, 2015. From June 11 to June 23, filming took place at the Lindale Mill in Lindale, Georgia, where the set was being built in late May.

=== Music ===
In December 2015, it was confirmed that Joseph Trapanese would return to compose the score for the film. The first track for the Allegiant soundtrack, "Scars", written by Tove Lo, Jakob Jerlström, Ludvig Söderberg, and performed by Tove Lo, was released as a single on February 19, 2016.

Track listing
No.	Title	Length
1.	"Scars (Tove Lo)"	3:39
2.	"Beyond The Wall"	3:48
3.	"The Council"	2:41
4.	"Making The Escape"	3:33
5.	"Over The Wall"	5:04
6.	"Chase Through Fringe"	1:19
7.	"Plasma Globes"	1:53
8.	"The Bureau"	3:20
9.	"The Elevator"	2:42
10.	"Memory Band"	4:26
11.	"Tent City"	3:50
12.	"Finding Tris"	7:50
13.	"Ship Crash"	1:26
14.	"Finding Four"	3:45
15.	"Return To Chicago"	3:55
16.	"Serum Released"	2:21
17.	"Saving Chicago"	3:47
Total length:		59:19

=== Promotion ===
A teaser trailer was released on September 15, 2015, followed by a full-length trailer two months later, on November 12, 2015. Another full-length trailer was released on January 22, 2016.

== Reception ==
=== Box office ===
Allegiant grossed $66.2 million in North America and $113.1 million in other territories for a worldwide total of $179 million.

In the United States and Canada, the film was projected to gross around $28–30 million in its opening weekend from 3,740 theaters, which would make it the lowest opening among the franchise. It earned the lowest previews among the series, with $2.35 million from 2,800 theaters. On its opening day, it made $11.9 million (including previews), down 43.6% from Insurgent, becoming the first film in the series to fail to open with over $20 million. Scott Mendelson of Forbes compared the decline in opening day to the third installment of The Chronicles of Narnia film series, Voyage of the Dawn Treader, which had a similar amount of drop. In comparison, the third Hunger Games film, Mockingjay – Part 1, fell only 21% from its previous film. In its opening weekend, the film grossed $29 million from 3,740 theaters, finishing second at the box office behind Zootopia. It was the first film of the franchise not to finish in first at the box office, and its opening was 46% below Divergent's and 44% behind Insurgent's. Lionsgate president of domestic distribution Richard Fay labeled the opening "pretty solid". As a result of the poor opening, Lionsgate's stock fell the next day, on Monday. Due to Allegiant's poor box-office resulting in Lionsgate's stock declining 3.3% by 72 cents to $21.13 in trading, Moody's Investors Service lowered Lionsgate's Speculative Grade Liquidity rating from SGL-2 to SGL-3.

The Divergent Series: Allegiant also struggled internationally where Lionsgate does not have operations in most countries and sells distribution rights to partners. It opened in 45 international markets a week ahead of its US debut, from March 9, and will receive a scattered release worldwide. Unlike its predecessor Insurgent, Lionsgate decided not to have a day and date release for Allegiant, instead intending to take advantage of various school holidays in international markets, and at the same time avoid competition with Walt Disney's animated Zootopia. Allegiant took the top spot in its opening day in France, Italy, Belgium, the Netherlands and Sweden. In its opening weekend, it earned $25.2 million from over 7,000 screens in 45 countries. It added 32 markets in its second weekend, earning a total of $22 million from 77 countries, which is down 13%. The top openings were in France ($5 million), Brazil ($2.7 million), the United Kingdom and Ireland ($2.6 million), Mexico ($2.5 million). In the United Kingdom, it posted the lowest opening in the series, opening at No. 2 behind Kung Fu Panda 3 including previews, which is 37% behind the opening of Insurgent. It had a very unsuccessful opening in South Korea with $523,000 from 392 screens. In China, it opened in third place behind The Angry Birds Movie and Captain America: Civil War with $10.8 million. As a result, it helped the film cross the $100 million mark internationally and immediately became the film's second biggest market behind Italy only. In terms of total earnings, its largest markets are China ($18.7 million), France ($15.1 million), followed by Brazil ($6.9 million), the U.K. ($6.5 million), Russia ($6 million) and Spain ($5.1 million).

Due to its underperformance, The Hollywood Reporter called it "the second big-budget miss for Lionsgate this year after Gods of Egypt". Many critics have blamed the underperformance of the film on Lionsgate's decision to split the last novel into two pictures. Due to the box office struggles of Allegiant, Lionsgate had planned to wrap up the film series with a television movie with a prospective television series spinoff. Made on a total budget of $183.6 million, including net production budget, advertising and promotion costs, and domestic home entertainment costs, Deadline Hollywood projected the film to make a mere profit of $3.5 million should it earn a net total of $187.1 million from various platforms (including theatrical revenues, TV rights and DVD sales). By comparison, Divergent made a net profit of $71.8 million and Insurgent $30.6 million. By contrast, The Hollywood Reporter estimated the film lost the studio around $50 million, when factoring together all expenses and revenues.

=== Critical response ===
The Divergent Series: Allegiant was met with negative responses by critics, who criticized the lack of originality, character advancements, visual effects and the decision to split the film into two parts. On Rotten Tomatoes, the film has a rating of 11%, based on 195 reviews, with an average rating of 4.10/10. The site's critical consensus reads, "Allegiant improves on previous entries in The Divergent Series on a few superficial levels, but they aren't enough to counteract a sense of growing boredom with a franchise that's gone on too long." Metacritic gives the film a score of 33 out of 100, based on 33 critics, indicating "generally unfavorable reviews". Audiences polled by CinemaScore gave the film an average grade of "B" on an A+ to F scale.

Writing for IGN, Max Nicholson, awarded Allegiant a 4/10, stating that "Allegiant is a prime example of everything that's wrong with modern YA sequels. Instead of embracing or building upon its core themes and constructs, it tears them all down with a wrecking ball of CGI and nonsensical storytelling". Peter Travers of Rolling Stone gave the film a 1/4 stars, stating that "The Divergent Series: Allegiant is another one of those cynical Hollywood cash grabs that takes the third book in bestselling juvie-lit trilogy (see Twilight and The Hunger Games) and stretches that last book into two movies so audiences are tricked into paying twice for egregiously padded piffle".

==== Cast and crew response ====
Shailene Woodley expressed disappointment with the quality of Allegiant, claiming that she almost quit acting following the decline of the franchise; co-star Zoë Kravitz voiced similar concerns about the direction of Allegiant and the direction of the series as a whole, saying, "I think as we went on, the story really kinda got lost and nobody really knew what we were doing anymore".

Producer Neil Burger (who directed the first film in the franchise) criticized Lionsgate's decision to split the film into two parts.

=== Accolades ===
Award	Category	Recipient(s)	Result	Ref.
37th Golden Raspberry Awards	Worst Actress	Naomi Watts	Nominated	
37th Golden Raspberry Awards	Worst Actress	Shailene Woodley	Nominated	
Hollywood Music in Media Awards	Best Song – Sci-Fi/Fantasy Film	"Scars" – Tove Lo	Nominated	
2016 Teen Choice Awards	Choice Movie: Action	The Divergent Series: Allegiant	Nominated	
2016 Teen Choice Awards	Choice Movie Actor: Action	Theo James	Nominated	
2016 Teen Choice Awards	Choice Movie Actress: Action	Shailene Woodley	Won	
2016 Teen Choice Awards	Choice Movie: Chemistry	Shailene Woodley & Theo James	Nominated	
2016 Teen Choice Awards	Choice Movie: Liplock	Shailene Woodley & Theo James	Won	
2016 Teen Choice Awards	Choice Movie: Scene Stealer	Miles Teller	Nominated	

== Future ==
=== Canceled fourth film ===
A theatrical sequel titled The Divergent Series: Ascendant, based on the latter half of the Allegiant book, was originally meant to wrap up the series and was originally set to be released on March 24, 2017, before being pushed back to June 9, 2017, with Lee Toland Krieger directing after Robert Schwentke backed out.

=== Canceled television series ===
In July 2016, after Allegiant underperformed at the box office, it was reported that Lionsgate would instead release Ascendant as a television film that would serve as a lead-in for a television spinoff series, in which both projects would add new characters to the story, moving beyond the books.

In September 2016, Shailene Woodley stated on Today that the film versus television decision was not finalized, and that it was "a limbo waiting game". In the same interview Woodley spoke despairingly of the chances of her returning to the project in a television format, although noting that she would be open to returning to it as a theatrical film. In February 2017, Woodley said she backed out of her starring role.

In August 2017, Starz and Lionsgate Television announced that they were beginning to develop the television series, with director Lee Toland Krieger and writer Adam Cozad remaining attached from the original project. In December 2018, Starz announced they were no longer seeking to develop a television series, citing the lack of interest from the cast and network executives.
