= List of Divergent characters =

This is a list of major and minor characters in the Divergent book trilogy and its subsequent film adaptation, The Divergent Series.

== Main characters ==
=== Tris Prior ===
Beatrice "Tris" Prior
- Divergent trilogy character
- First appearance: Divergent
- Last appearance: Allegiant
- Created by: Veronica Roth
- Portrayed by: Shailene Woodley; Elyse Cole (young)

In-universe information
- Gender: Female
- Family: Andrew Prior (father); Natalie Prior (mother); Caleb Prior
- Original faction: Abnegation
- Faction: Dauntless

Beatrice "Tris" Prior is the viewpoint character in Divergent and Insurgent, and shares the viewpoint character role in Allegiant with Tobias "Four" Eaton. Born in the Abnegation faction to Andrew and Natalie Prior, she describes herself as having pale blonde hair, wide gray-blue eyes, a long, thin nose and a short and skinny stature. She bears a tattoo of three ravens on her left collarbone leading down to her heart, each one representing one of her family members; she also has a Dauntless seal on her left shoulder and an Abnegation seal on her right shoulder.

In Divergent, 16-year-old Tris has to take the aptitude test to determine her future faction. Tori, her test administrator, tells her that she is "Divergent", that is, she has the aptitude to fit into multiple factions (Erudite, Abnegation and Dauntless), but is warned never to tell anyone that information, not even her family members. In the Choosing Ceremony, she transfers to Dauntless, and assumes a new moniker "Tris". She befriends fellow initiates Christina and Al, who are from Candor, and Will, an Erudite transfer. In the first initiation period, her performance in physical matches against top-ranked candidates such as Peter places her on the brink of being cut from the faction, but she then participates in a capture the flag event where she plays a major part in her team's victory. She has also stood up for the other initiates.

On visiting day, (Note: In the Divergent film, instead of a parent visitation, Tris's mother secretly meets her during a Dauntless distribution event.) her mother Natalie tells her to ask her brother to research the Erudite's simulation serum and warns her about how she is being watched, revealing she was originally a Dauntless. During the second initiation period, where the candidates are placed in a virtual reality simulation to see how they deal with their greatest fears (for Tris, it is being attacked by crows, which is symbolic of not having power or control; drowning, symbolic of being trapped and powerless, being tied and burned to death; intimacy, symbolic of Four wanting her for her body and not being able to trust him; and killing her family members, symbolic of watching her family die and being responsible for their death), Tris shows an uncanny ability to dismiss or clear the obstacles in record time. This draws Four's attention as he invites her to enter his fear simulation and gives her tips as to how to give a Dauntless-expected response.

After passing initiation, she discovers that Erudite plan to attack Abnegation. When a mind-controlling serum does not work on her, Jeanine Matthews, the Erudite leader orders Tris executed. (Note: In the Divergent film, when Tris is to be executed for betraying Dauntless, she is to be shot on site instead of placed in the water tank.) Tris is saved by her mother, but during their escape, she is forced to shoot Will, and her mother is killed. Reuniting with her father, Caleb and Marcus, they sneak into the Dauntless base, but her father is killed in battle. Tris confronts a mind-controlled Four but helps him break free of the mind control, and then stop Jeanine in time to release the Dauntless.

In Insurgent, Tris, Tobias, Marcus, Caleb, and Peter are fugitives hiding out in Amity sector. She overhears a conversation between the Amity leader, Johanna Reyes, and Marcus that Abnegation leaders died protecting a secret. When Erudite and Dauntless traitors arrive to capture them, they escape by jumping on a train to the factionless camp where they meet Tobias's mother. During a visit to Candor, she reveals that she had killed Will. She later surrenders herself to Erudite to save her Dauntless friends, where she finds out that her brother is working for Jeanine but is later able to escape with Tobias and Peter. She joins Marcus Eaton in order to obtain the information stolen by Erudite from Abnegation and transfer it to every faction. When Tobias finds out about this, he is shocked and angry at her, but they later reconcile and she hopes that they will have no secrets from each other.

In Allegiant, Tris frees Caleb before he is executed, although she still has not forgiven him for his betrayal. The two alongside Tobias, Christina, Peter, Tori, Uriah, and Cara, begin an expedition to the outskirts of Chicago and arrive at the Bureau of Genetic Welfare, a US government-sponsored agency that is behind the faction system. Tris meets with the Bureau leader, David, who gives her Natalie's journal. Tris becomes jealous of a Bureau staff, Nita, fearing that she will attract Tobias, but joins her during her attempt to overthrow the genetically pure Bureau leaders. Nevertheless, Tris saves David when she finds out that Nita wants the death serum, not the memory serum. Later, Tris learns that David wants to expose the memory serum on the whole population of Chicago to restart his experiment. She formulates a plan with Matthew, Nita, Caleb, and Cara, to stop him. Caleb volunteers to undergo the suicidal mission to expose the memory serum on the Bureau, but Tris replaces him because he only does so out of regret, and asks him to tell Tobias her final message: that she does not want to leave him. During the mission, Tris manages to repel the death serum by thinking of those who had died for her, but she is shot by David just as she is able to expose the memory serum. As she lays dying, she learns to forgive herself and others for all the things that she had done to get there and sees visions of her mother reaching out to her.

In the epilogue, set two and a half years afterward, it is revealed that Tris' body was cremated after her death. During a celebration of the Choosing Ceremony, Tobias spreads her ashes across Chicago while riding a zip line.

Shailene Woodley plays Beatrice "Tris" Prior in the 2014 Divergent, 2015 The Divergent Series: Insurgent, and 2016 The Divergent Series: Allegiant.

=== Tobias "Four" Eaton ===
Tobias "Four" Eaton
- The Divergent trilogy character
- First appearance: Divergent
- Last appearance: We Can Be Mended
- Created by: (Veronica Roth)
- Portrayed by: Theo James

In-universe information
- Gender: Male
- Family: Marcus Eaton (father); Evelyn Johnson-Eaton (mother)
- Original faction: Abnegation
- Faction: Dauntless

Tobias "Four" Eaton is a member of Dauntless and serves as the instructor to the initiates transferring into Dauntless. He was born in the Abnegation faction to Marcus Eaton and Evelyn Johnson. His mother supposedly died and left him with his abusive father, who would strike him with his belt. During his Choosing Ceremony, he chooses Dauntless as his faction to escape Marcus. He has dark blue eyes and dark brown hair with a scar on his chin and a few freckles on his nose. He has tattooed the symbol of each faction on his spine, starting from Dauntless at the top, then Abnegation, Candor, Erudite and Amity. He gets the nickname "Four" from his instructor Amar due to having only four fears: heights, shooting innocents, claustrophobia and his father, Marcus Eaton.

Four: A Divergent Story Collection, a short story collection in which he is the narrator tells the story of 16-year-old Tobias Eaton as he decides to escape from the abusive home with Marcus in Abnegation and joins the Dauntless faction. He befriends Dauntless-born initiates Zeke and Shauna and develops a rivalry with Eric, an Erudite transfer. Tobias learns that he is a Divergent when he manages to escape the simulation serum through unorthodox means. Amar, a fellow Divergent, warns him to lay low, a warning that proves right when he is found dead mysteriously. He learns about Erudite's plan to mind control Dauntless and begins spying on them. Max invites Tobias for an interview to become the future head of Dauntless, but he refuses, electing to become an instructor instead.

In Divergent, set two years after Four, Tobias meets Tris, who, like him, is an Abnegation transfer. The two slowly develop a relationship and Tobias helps Tris go through her initiation tests, advising her on how to pass the simulation serum through legitimate means, and protecting her from Eric's taunts and saving her when Al, Peter, and Drew try to kill her. In Free Four: Tobias Tells the Divergent Knife-Throwing Scene, it is revealed that Tobias had plans to leave Dauntless, but upon meeting Tris, he vows not to leave her side. Tobias and Tris are immune to the mind control serum used by Erudite to execute their plan of exterminating Abnegation, but Tobias is captured and injected with a serum that does work on Divergents. He is forced to attack Tris when she attempts to deactivate the serum, but is helped to break free when Tris tells him that she does not want to hurt him. Together with Tris, he deactivates the mind control serum before escaping towards the Amity sector alongside Caleb, Marcus, and Peter.

In Insurgent, Dauntless and Erudite traitors recognize him at Amity headquarters. During the fight he, Tris, Caleb and Susan manage to escape through boarding a train, which is full of factionless including former Dauntless Edward. They are led to the factionless headquarters, where Evelyn is waiting for them. She wants Four to convince other Dauntless to join the factionless. Going to Candor, Tobias and Tris are subjected to the truth serum, during which Tobias reveals that he joined Dauntless to escape his abusive father. He also finds out that Tris shot Will while he was under the influence of the mind control serum, which makes him angry because she did not reveal that information to him. Eric, along with other Dauntless traitors, attacks Candor but gets caught. Tobias, along with others, secretly observes a meeting between Candor representative Jack and Erudite representative Max, who wants Eric back but the meeting becomes unsuccessful as Max gets killed. During the secret meeting of Dauntless, Four, Tori and Harrison are selected as new leaders. They sentence Eric to death and Four executes him. He also makes an agreement with the factionless to destroy Erudite and establish a new government. Later they find out about a simulation that will kill Dauntless members until a Divergent is given to Erudite. As a result, Tris decides to sacrifice herself but he begs her not to. She agrees, but leaves for Erudite as he sleeps. He also surrenders himself to Erudite and later he and Tris escape the Erudite headquarters with the help of Peter. They arrive at Abnegation sector to meet the Dauntless and the factionless. He and Tris also admit their love to each other. Later, he is deeply shocked and hurt when he finds out that Tris aligned with his father Marcus, but they later reconcile.

In Allegiant, in which he serves as a co-viewpoint character, he alongside Tris, Caleb, Christina, Peter, Tori, Uriah, and Cara, are given the mission by the Allegiant to escape Chicago and find out about their surroundings. Arriving at the Bureau of Genetic Welfare, he is reunited with his long-thought-to-be-dead mentor, Amar. In the Bureau, he finds out that though he is a Divergent, he is not considered genetically pure like Tris, which greatly damages his pride. He becomes close to Nita, a genetically damaged Bureau member, and is convinced to take part in her rebellion against the GP leaders of the Bureau. Four is indirectly responsible for the explosion that causes Uriah's brain damage and eventual death, which he feels guilt for. After the rebellion, Four joins the team that consists of Christina, Peter, and Amar, to return to Chicago and prevent the war between the factionless and the Allegiant. He offers Evelyn a memory serum so she can be born anew and become his mother again. Evelyn embraces him yet does not drink the serum before announcing her intention to end the war. Four also gives Peter a memory serum, as per his wish to be reborn anew. When Four returns to the Bureau in triumph, he is informed by Cara that Tris has died during her attempt to expose the leaders with the memory serum. Angered, he blames Caleb, who delivers Tris' final words to him, and almost strangles the now-blank David. He undergoes a deep depression and almost injects himself with a memory serum, but is convinced otherwise by Christina, who states that he should not forget his memories with Tris. The two become best friends over their losses.

In the epilogue set two and a half years afterward, Four becomes an assistant council member of the new Chicago and moves to a new apartment as further away from his former home. He reunites with his mother, who has returned from her two years of self-exile. To celebrate Choosing Day, Four scatters Tris' ashes while riding a zipline with his friends, having come to accept her sacrifice and death. In the short story We Can Be Mended, set in the years after the epilogue, Four has begun to move on from Tris by dating Christina.

English actor Theo James plays Tobias "Four" Eaton in the 2014 Divergent, 2015 The Divergent Series: Insurgent, and 2016 The Divergent Series: Allegiant.

=== Caleb Prior ===
Caleb Prior
- The Divergent trilogy character
- First appearance: Divergent
- Last appearance: Allegiant
- Created by: Veronica Roth
- Portrayed by: Ansel Elgort

In-universe information
- Gender: Male
- Family: Andrew Prior (father); Natalie Prior (mother); Beatrice "Tris" Prior (sister)
- Original faction: Abnegation
- Faction: Erudite

Caleb Prior is a member of Erudite faction. He was born in Abnegation to Andrew and Natalie Prior. He is the older brother of Tris by less than a year, as the two take the Choosing Ceremony at the same time. He is described as having green eyes with hooked nose, dark hair and dimpled cheeks. He, like his sister, chooses a faction different from Abnegation, spreading rumors fueled by Erudite that their parents had abused them to the point that both choose to transfer.

In Divergent, during the choosing ceremony, Caleb chooses Erudite and fits well with other Erudite initiates. At the advice of their mother, Tris goes to the Erudite compound to meet and talk to Caleb about the simulation serum but he defends his faction. He also feels disappointed by knowing that Natalie went to visit Tris and not him. He is also shocked when he finds out that members of Abnegation are banned in the Erudite compound. Later, Caleb leaves Erudite after learning about their plan to use Dauntless to attack Abnegation. He joins the surviving Abnegation members along with his father and goes to Dauntless with him and Tris. After Tris and Four shut down the simulation of Erudite, he escapes with them on the train towards Amity.

In Insurgent, Caleb manages to escape with the others when Erudite and Dauntless traitors attack Amity and board a train. They meet the factionless at the train and arrive at said sector. He later leaves for the Abnegation sector with Susan. Caleb also appears at Candor with Marcus Eaton after Eric's attack on Candor but leaves again. When Tris surrenders herself to Jeanine to save Dauntless from simulation, she sees her brother at the Erudite headquarters and finds out that he was working for Jeanine all along. He was also the one responsible for transferring the information about Tris' aptitude test to her. During the invasion of Marcus's group at Erudite, Caleb tries to stop them but is knocked down by Marcus.

In Allegiant, with the takeover of Chicago by the factionless, Caleb is subjected to a trial for his treachery and is sentenced to death. He is rescued by Four as per Tris' wish, although she still has not forgiven him for his betrayal. Caleb participates in the escape from Chicago and arrives at the Bureau of Genetic Welfare, a compound responsible for monitoring the factions. Having to deal with Tris' ignorance, Caleb becomes close to Peter and spends his time reading the Bureau's extensive information, particularly regarding his genealogy. Later, when the group attempt to expose the memory serum on the Bureau members, Caleb volunteers himself on the suicide mission, tearfully asking his sister if it will make her forgive him for his actions. However, knowing that he only does so out of regret, Tris substitutes Caleb on the mission while telling him to pass her final message to Four: that she does not want to leave him. Tris, while managing to complete the task, dies in the process, meaning that Caleb has lost his entire family. Upon Four's return, Caleb does as his sister asked and passes her final message to Four, angering him.

Two and a half years later, Caleb has become one of the scientists working on the agricultural division of Chicago, along with Cara, and is also successful in mending his relationship with Four, although the latter purposefully stays away from him due to his reminding him of Tris. He also builds makeshift leg braces for Shauna, allowing her to walk again.

Ansel Elgort plays Caleb Prior in the 2014 Divergent, 2015 The Divergent Series: Insurgent, and 2016 The Divergent Series: Allegiant.

=== Marcus Eaton ===
Marcus Eaton
- The Divergent trilogy character
- First appearance: The Transfer
- Created by: Veronica Roth
- Portrayed by: Ray Stevenson

In-universe information
- Gender: Male
- Family: Tobias "Four" Eaton (son); Evelyn Johnson-Eaton (ex-wife)
- Original faction: Abnegation
- Faction: Abnegation

Marcus Eaton is one of the council members of Abnegation and is the only one out of these who remains alive after the attack of Dauntless controlled by Erudite through simulation. Born and raised in Abnegation, he is the husband of Evelyn Johnson and the father of Tobias "Four", both of whom he abused thoroughly, resulting in Evelyn leaving the family to become factionless and Four transferring to Dauntless the instant he had the choice, much to Marcus' shock as he wanted him to continue living in Abnegation. As revealed in Insurgent, Marcus is a Divergent, the realization of which is the catalyst for Tris in Allegiant into not buying the Bureau's propaganda of painting the genetically damaged as naturally retarded, as Marcus is genetically pure, yet he acts with so much ego that he might as well not be following the Bureau's logic. Marcus is a good friend of Tris' father, Andrew, who is also a council member of Abnegation. He is described to have been similar in appearance to his son - in particular, both of them have similar dark blue eyes.

In Divergent, the Erudite spread the news of Marcus' abusive nature that resulted in his son's transferring as a way for them to discredit Abnegation. After Tris and Four manage to stop the simulation serum on Dauntless, Marcus alongside them, Caleb, and Peter board the train towards Amity, surviving the Abnegation's massacre that claim the lives of his fellow council members, including Andrew and Mr. Black.

In Insurgent, Marcus arrives at the Amity sector and also reveals to the Amity leader Johanna that the Abnegation leaders died to protect a secret. He appears at Candor with Caleb after Eric's attack. Four attacks him in front of everyone as the Dauntless members are teasing him to be a coward due to his confession under the influence of the truth serum. Upon returning to the Abnegation sector to prepare for the war against Erudite, Marcus is kicked out by Evelyn from their house, stumbling upon Tris who is reminiscing her home before the war. He convinces her that Jeanine Matthews stole the information her parents and the other Abnegation leaders died to protect. He wants to share this information with the other factions as well. Marcus along with his group invade Erudite headquarters and knocks down Caleb Prior when he tries to stop them. The plan for exposing the information is ultimately successful, although Marcus himself is arrested by the factionless.

In Allegiant, Marcus is jailed for his disobedience to the factionless and is scheduled to have his hearing a few weeks afterward. During the case, Evelyn ultimately banishes Marcus from Chicago, instead of executing him. He meets up with Johanna, who decides to provide assistance through her band of Allegiant against the factionless, although she terminates their friendship due to the revelation of his abuses. The two stage terror attacks at some of the factionless' weapon barracks, but heed Evelyn's offer of a ceasefire, which requires Marcus to never attempt on leading Chicago's people again. Once Four says his final goodbye, Marcus departs and is never seen again.

Ray Stevenson plays Marcus Eaton in the 2014 Divergent, 2015 The Divergent Series: Insurgent, and 2016 The Divergent Series: Allegiant films. In the second film, Marcus' role is significantly downplayed from the book: he only appears in two cameos near the start and the end of the film before disappearing, in the process cutting his roles in visiting the Candor headquarters, reuniting with Evelyn, and assisting Tris during the insurgency against Erudite. In the third film, Evelyn gives him the memory serum gas to wipe his memory.

=== Jeanine Matthews ===
Jeanine Matthews
- The Divergent trilogy character
- First appearance: Divergent
- Last appearance: Insurgent
- Created by: Veronica Roth
- Portrayed by: Kate Winslet

In-universe information
- Gender: Female
- Original faction: Erudite
- Faction: Erudite

Jeanine Matthews appears in Divergent and Insurgent, serving as the main antagonist in both novels. She was born in, and chose, Erudite as her faction. Jeanine was a childhood friend of Tris' father, Andrew, but their relationship ended after he saw her subjecting a factionless into a simulation in cold blood. She was appointed as leader of Erudite solely based on her IQ score. She developed the Aptitude Test, which has to be taken before the Choosing Ceremony. She creates many articles about Abnegation based on lies and published in newspapers run by Erudite, to make people believe that they are not a selfless faction but rather greedy and selfish. A bespectacled woman, she has sharp, watery gray eyes with an attractive face, stretch marks on her knees, and her fingernails look to have been bitten raw.

In Divergent, she develops the serum to control Dauntless and make them kill Abnegation. When Tris and Four are caught, she injects Four with another serum that works on Divergent and sends him to the Control Room to oversee the attack and sentences Tris to death. Her plans are stopped when Tris escapes and breaks Four from his mind control, then injects the simulation serum on Jeanine herself to make her stop the Dauntless simulation.

In Insurgent, she sends Dauntless traitors and Erudite to hunt down the Divergents and bring them to Erudite headquarters for testing. She later creates another serum, which Eric injects into Dauntless during his attack at Candor. She sends Max to Candor to bring Eric, Divergent and those who are not injected with the serum but the mission becomes a failure as Max gets killed. When Tris surrenders herself to save the Dauntless injected with serum, she injects Tris with a terror-inducing drug so that Four will give up the locations of the factionless safe houses but remains unsuccessful up to the end as she cannot find a simulation to control Tris. Jeanine later orders for Tris's execution. When Dauntless and factionless attack Erudite compound, Tori corners her in her laboratory. Tori wants to avenge her brother, who was Divergent and was killed on Jeanine's order. Despite Tris's insistence that they need her alive to access the information, stolen from Abnegation, Tori stabs her with a knife, which kills her.

In Allegiant, it is revealed that Jeanine was carrying the legacy of her predecessor, Norton, who was explicitly genocidal on the Divergents. She also received the simulation serums for the Dauntless members from the Bureau of Genetic Welfare, although she herself resisted from expending their influence on the Chicago society whom she wanted to never discover the truth about the experiment.

Kate Winslet plays Jeanine Matthews in both the 2014 film adaptation of Divergent and its 2015 follow-up The Divergent Series: Insurgent. In the film series, Jeanine is not killed by Tori in her laboratory. Instead, she is taken for custody by Evelyn and her factionless subordinates first, then executed by Evelyn inside her prison.

=== Christina ===
Christina
- The Divergent trilogy character
- First appearance: Divergent
- Last appearance: Allegiant
- Created by: Veronica Roth
- Portrayed by: Zoë Kravitz

In-universe information
- Gender: Female
- Family: Stephanie (mother); Rose (sister)
- Original faction: Candor
- Faction: Dauntless

Christina is a member of Dauntless faction and friend of Tris. She was born in Candor but chooses Dauntless as her faction at the Choosing Ceremony. She is in relationship with Will which ends with his death. She has short black hair with dark brown skin and eyes. She along with Tris get a tattoo of the Dauntless seal.

In Divergent, Christina helps Tris on to the train and later they jump from the moving train together on the roof below. They become friends, with Christina helping Tris in her makeover. During the sparring in training activity, she pairs up against Molly, who brutally beats her up and in the end she forfeits the fight. Eric, not happy with her, leads her and other initiates to the Chasm. He shoves her towards the railing and orders her to climb over it and hang over the other side for five minutes - if she fails to do that she will have to leave Dauntless and become factionless. Despite her injuries, she manages to stay there for five minutes. The second time she fights, Will is placed against her to whom she also loses. During the game of Capture the Flag, she is picked by Four as one of his team members. Tris formulates the plan to capture the flag but Christina takes the flag and later apologizes to her. On Visiting Day, her mother and sister come to meet her. During the second stage of initiation involving simulations, it is revealed that she is afraid of moths. She also starts a relationship with Will before "the fear landscape" stage of initiation. She walks out on Tris when Tris comes out first among the transfers for their rankings for stage two and Peter accuses Tris for manipulating others but they reconcile after Peter's attack on Tris. She along with other Dauntless is put on mind control to attack Abnegation and wakes up when Tris and Four shut it down.

In Insurgent, she meets Tris at Candor not knowing that Tris killed Will. Under the influence of truth serum, Tris reveals the truth, causing Christina to distance herself from her. However, she is encouraged by Will's sister, Cara, to forgive Tris. Later, she and Tris manage to save Hector and Kee from their suicidal mind control imposed on them by Erudite, but fail to save Marlene. She goes with Tris and Marcus at Amity to inform their leader about the information stolen by Erudite and also invade Erudite compound, but becomes disabled after a fight.

In Allegiant, Christina escapes out of Chicago with Tris and the others, where they find the Bureau of Genetic Welfare. Along with Tobias, Peter and Amar, she goes into the city to inoculate its inhabitants against the memory serum, but gives a vial of the serum itself to Tobias to use on his mother or father in the hopes of stopping the conflict. After Tris's death at the hands of David, Christina manages to convince Tobias not to wipe his memory with the memory serum, and in the epilogue they are shown to be close friends. In the short story We Can Be Mended, Christina manages to move on from Will and is dating Four.

Zoë Kravitz plays Christina in the 2014 Divergent, 2015 The Divergent Series: Insurgent, and 2016 The Divergent Series: Allegiant.

=== Tori Wu ===
Tori Wu
- The Divergent trilogy character
- First appearance: Divergent
- Last appearance: Allegiant, Four: A Divergent Story Collection
- Created by: Veronica Roth
- Portrayed by: Maggie Q

In-universe information
- Gender: Female
- Family: George Wu (brother)
- Original faction: Erudite
- Faction: Dauntless

Tori Wu was born in Erudite and later chose Dauntless as her faction along with her brother George. Her brother was thought to be killed by Dauntless and Erudite, when they found out that he was Divergent, but later turns up alive in Allegiant. She administers the aptitude test for both Tris and Four. She is also one of the tattoo artists in the Dauntless compound and tattooed ravens on Tris's collarbone. Later in Insurgent, she becomes one of the leaders of Dauntless along with Four and Harrison. She is of Asian descent and has small black eyes and hair with a few streaks of gray. She has a tattoo of a black and white hawk with a red eye on her neck.

In The Transfer, Tori administers the aptitude test for Four and remains quiet about him being Divergent; she later becomes friends with him during his initiation at Dauntless.

In Divergent, she is the evaluator of Tris's test and warns her to keep quiet about being Divergent or her life will be in danger. After she manages to break through the simulation, she goes to Tori for answers. Tori reveals to her that Divergents are capable of shutting down and breaking through the simulation. She also reminds her to keep quiet about it by telling her about her brother. She, along with other Dauntless, attacks the Abnegation sector under the influence of serum and kills a man.

In Insurgent, Tori and Zeke arrive at the Candor sector in injured condition and it is revealed that they were working as spies among Erudite and Dauntless traitors but when their secret was revealed they escaped to Candor to join other Dauntless. She along with Four and Harrison are elected as new leaders of Dauntless and sentence Eric to death. During the attack on Erudite compound, Tori manages to corner Jeanine Matthews in her laboratory and kills her to avenge her brother, who was killed on Jeanine's orders. Later she calls Tris a traitor because Tris tried to stop her from killing Jeanine, so they could retrieve the information stolen from Abnegation.

In Allegiant, Tori is selected as one of the members of the expedition sent by the Allegiant to find more about the outside world. She is killed midway through, when a factionless opens fire on her. She dies right before she would have been reunited with George.

Maggie Q plays Tori in the 2014 Divergent, 2015 The Divergent Series: Insurgent, and The Divergent Series: Allegiant films. In the second film, Tori is not the one who kills Jeanine. In the Allegiant film, she is shot dead by Edgar while the group has climbed the top of the wall.

=== Eric Coulter ===
Eric Coulter
- The Divergent trilogy character
- First appearance: Divergent
- Last appearance: Insurgent, Four: A Divergent Story Collection
- Created by: Veronica Roth
- Portrayed by: Jai Courtney

In-universe information
- Gender: Male
- Former Faction: Erudite
- Faction: Dauntless

Eric was born in Erudite and transfers to Dauntless. In Divergent, he is one of the leaders of Dauntless, and is the youngest ever known. He is Four's rival as they were in the same year of initiation and Four was ranked first while he was second. Four also suspects him of being responsible for the death of Amar, who was their instructor and a Divergent (this is later proven wrong). He is described as tall with long dark colored hair and has numerous piercings. He has dull gray color eyes which appears cold and a loud and long evil laugh.

In Divergent, he appears as one of the leaders of Dauntless. He is cruel and harsh and takes pleasure from others' pain. He appears to pick heartlessness rather than continually thorough considering circumstances amid the session of Capture the Flag, though he loses when Four's group win. Later, when the Erudite begin their simulation on Dauntless, Eric assists them and takes glee on being apparently mind controlled, threatening him with a gun. Tris shoots him on the foot to save Four.

In Insurgent, he along with Erudite and Dauntless traitors attack Candor, to capture Abnegation survivors and Divergent for testing and also injects the Dauntless with another serum. Tris manages to subdue him after he executed a young Divergent and Eric is subsequently captured by Dauntless. When they find out that one of Erudite's peace conditions for Candor is to hand over Eric safely, the newly elected Dauntless leaders sentence him to death. He asks Four to be his executioner, who complies. Despite his taunting and casualness, even in the face of death, he cannot be brave.

Jai Courtney plays Eric in the 2014 Divergent and 2015 The Divergent Series: Insurgent films.

=== Peter Hayes ===
Peter
- The Divergent trilogy character
- First appearance: Divergent
- Last appearance: Allegiant
- Created by: Veronica Roth
- Portrayed by: Miles Teller

In-universe information
- Gender: Male
- Original faction: Candor
- Faction: Dauntless

Peter was born in Candor but chooses Dauntless as his faction. He is described as having an angelic face, dark green eyes, shiny dark hair and olive skin. His nose is long with a narrow bridge. Beneath his kind and innocent appearance however, he was violent, aggressive, ill-tempered, and cruel, which made him one of the key villainous characters of the Divergent series, and a mortal enemy of Tris Prior.

In Divergent, he first appears in the train with Christina and Tris and mocks Tris by calling her "Stiff". During the sparring in training, he beats Tris until she falls unconscious, but loses to Edward. Eric chooses him as his team member in the game of Capture the Flag. On the last day of their initiation's stage one, he along with Molly, Drew, and some others make fun of Tris's physique, when she heads back to the dorm to fetch her dress as her pants do not fit her anymore because of her new muscles. Peter yanks off her towel and they laugh and make fun of her. When stage one's results come out and Edward comes first followed by Peter, Peter in his jealousy stabs Edward in the eye with a butter knife that night. But Tris and Christina decide not to report him as they know that Dauntless will not do anything to Peter. When Tris comes first for the second stage of initiation, he does not take it well at all and turns Tris's friends against her by accusing her of manipulating others to seem weak and achieving better results. He then kidnaps Tris along with Al and Drew and hangs her over the chasm until Four comes to her rescue. He is one of the few people who are not under simulation controlled by Erudite because of his already violent nature and encounters Tris, Andrew, Caleb and others when they return to stop the simulation. After his arm gets shot by Tris, he agrees to help them stop the simulation if the party will take him with them to Amity due to his fear that he will get killed because of his knowledge of computers controlling the simulations.

In Insurgent, he appears at Amity with the others, still suffering from the bullet wound. Later he steals the Erudite disk from Tris's room but later gets caught and beaten up by Tris. During the Erudite and Dauntless traitors' attack on Amity, Tris saves his life. When Tris surrenders herself to Erudite, she finds out that after the attack on Amity, Peter has joined the Erudite and he is assigned as her guard. To make up for owing her his life, he fakes her death and helps her and Four escape from Erudite. He arrives at Abnegation where factionless and Dauntless are staying and Edward confronts him. He declines to join the others in their invasion at Erudite. In Allegiant, Peter participates in the escape from Chicago and arrives at the Bureau of Genetic Welfare. He joins the four-man team to save the people of Chicago from having their memories wiped by the Memory Serum. During the war, Four gives a memory serum to Peter to reset his memory when Peter states that he no longer wants to be mean and cruel and wants to change, showing that he does regret his cruel personality and actions.

In the epilogue it is revealed that Peter has moved to Milwaukee, which the Bureau formerly experimented on, and works in an office that transfers residences from Milwaukee to Chicago. In the aftermath of the serum, he retained some of his cruel and harsh traits, but not all of them, and he was still a good person after all. Four expresses in the epilogue that he still disliked Peter, but he no longer hated him like before.

Miles Teller plays Peter in the 2014 Divergent, 2015 The Divergent Series: Insurgent, and 2016 The Divergent Series: Allegiant. In the Allegiant film, Peter makes a deal with David to convince Evelyn to use the Memory Serum gas to erase the memories of everyone in Chicago. He also shoots Evelyn and returns to the Bureau.

=== Edward ===
Edward
- The Divergent trilogy character
- First appearance: Divergent
- Last appearance: Allegiant
- Created by: Veronica Roth
- Portrayed by: Ben Lamb

In-universe information
- Gender: Male
- Original faction: Erudite
- Faction: Factionless

Edward was born in Erudite but transfers into Dauntless. He is great in hand-to-hand combat, which he learned since he was ten and is often described as fast and athletic.

In Divergent, he appears as a Dauntless initiate. During the sparring training he beats Peter. When the results of stage one of initiation are announced, Edward is ranked first followed by Peter. Peter, out of anger and jealousy, along with Drew, stabs Edward in the eye with a butter knife. Tris comforts him until the nurse arrives just like her mother did to her once and also cleans his blood off the floor. After that he and his girlfriend, Myra, who transferred to Dauntless to be with him, leave Dauntless and become factionless. In Insurgent, he meets Tris, Four and others after their escape from Amity on the train. He leads them to factionless leader Evelyn Johnson-Eaton. It is revealed that he and Myra are no longer together due to his increasingly violent nature. He brutally beat up Molly and Drew when they tried to join the factionless division in which Edward is. He also hits Peter in the face, when he arrives at Abnegation sector with Tris and Four. During the attack on Erudite headquarters, he gets shot on the side. In Allegiant, he is shot to death in the beginning of the book, after trying to destroy the Choosing Ceremony's bowls.

Ben Lamb plays Edward in the 2014 Divergent film. The scene where Peter blinds him and him leaving Dauntless to become factionless is only retained in the deleted scenes. He also does not reprise the role in the sequels The Divergent Series: Insurgent and The Divergent Series: Allegiant, his role instead being replaced by a new character named Edgar, portrayed by Jonny Weston.

== Secondary characters by faction ==
=== Abnegation ===
Abnegation is one of the five factions in the world of Divergent. It is dedicated to selflessness and forgetting oneself for the sake of others. It was formed on the principle that selfishness and greed is the cause of human problems. Their chosen color is gray, as they all wear gray colored, loose fitting clothes. It is represented by gray stones at the Choosing Ceremony.

==== Natalie Prior ====
Natalie Prior
- The Divergent trilogy character
- First appearance: Divergent
- Last appearance: Allegiant
- Created by: Veronica Roth
- Portrayed by: Ashley Judd

In-universe information
- Gender: Female
- Family: Andrew Prior (husband); Beatrice Prior (daughter); Caleb Prior (son)
- Original faction: Dauntless
- Faction: Abnegation

Natalie Prior (née Wright) is the mother of Beatrice "Tris" and Caleb and wife of Andrew Prior. She is described as pretty, with blonde hair, and has pale green eyes with dimples on her cheeks. She was originally from Dauntless and is also a Divergent like her daughter. She explains to Tris that she was born to a Dauntless leader and that her own mother had advised her to transfer into another faction to protect her from being killed due to her status. This story, however, is only a cover-up, as Allegiant reveals that Natalie is not actually from Chicago at all, but instead from Milwaukee, another experimental city of the Bureau of Genetic Welfare. She escaped from that city at the age of 16, after her mother killed her father, and was taken up by the Bureau, whose leader, David, fell in love with her, in the fringes. Natalie was sent to Chicago to prevent Erudite from exterminating Divergents. The Bureau exposed the entire city on memory serum so they would not remember that Natalie was not there before and registered her as a 15-year-old so she could have time to adapt in Dauntless for a year. Though she originally planned to transfer to Erudite, she fell in love with Andrew Prior and the two transferred together to Abnegation. During her time in the city, she managed to save Divergents, including Amar and George, about to be executed by Erudite by secretly moving them to the Bureau.

In Divergent, she tells Tris that she loves and supports her no matter which faction she chooses. Her husband becomes disappointed when their children choose factions other than Abnegation, but she smiles at them and supports their decision. She comes to visit Tris on Visiting Day and after finding out her being Divergent, instructs her to visit her brother and talk to him about simulation serum. She also appears in Tris's Fear Landscape. When Jeanine sentences Tris to death, she comes to her rescue. She saves her from drowning in the tank and with her attempt to reach the sector where the surviving Abnegation are hiding. She dies protecting her daughter from a fatal shot.

Following her death, Tris still recounts her experiences with her mother while making many decisions. David gives her Natalie's diary during the first visit to the Bureau and she learns about her mother's true background. At the end of Allegiant, after Tris is mortally wounded by David, she has visions of her mother reaching her arms to her for an embrace before she dies.

Ashley Judd portrayed Natalie Prior in the 2014 Divergent, 2015 The Divergent Series: Insurgent, and 2016 The Divergent Series: Allegiant.

==== Andrew Prior ====
Andrew Prior
- The Divergent trilogy character
- First appearance: Divergent
- Last appearance: Allegiant
- Created by: Veronica Roth
- Portrayed by: Tony Goldwyn

In-universe information
- Gender: Male
- Family: Natalie Prior (wife); Beatrice "Tris" Prior (daughter); Caleb Prior (son)
- Original faction: Erudite
- Faction: Abnegation

Andrew Prior is the father of Beatrice and Caleb and husband of Natalie Prior. As revealed in Allegiant, David is a descendant of the brother of Edith Prior, one of the first settlers of the Chicago experiment, and his family was originally Abnegation, but as Andrew was born in Erudite it is apparent that they switched factions through generations. Andrew's parents were friendly with Jeanine Matthews but he chose Abnegation as his faction. He is one of the council members of Abnegation along with Marcus Eaton. He is described as having a hooked nose with black hair and is an affectionate and caring man.

In Divergent, he becomes angry when both his son and daughter do not choose Abnegation as their faction and does not visit Tris on Visiting Day as a result. He appears in Tris's fear landscape. Reuniting with his son and daughter during the attack of Dauntless (controlled by Erudite) at Abnegation, Andrew goes to the Dauntless headquarters with Tris and others and becomes upset with her when she shoots Peter. He dies due to a gunshot to the stomach from a Dauntless guard under simulation control.

Tony Goldwyn plays Andrew Prior in the 2014 Divergent and the 2015 The Divergent Series: Insurgent films.

==== Susan Black ====
Susan Black
- The Divergent trilogy character
- First appearance: Divergent
- Last appearance: Insurgent
- Created by: Veronica Roth

In-universe information
- Gender: Female
- Family: Mr. Black (father); Robert Black (brother)
- Original faction: Abnegation
- Faction: Abnegation

Susan Black is a member of Abnegation faction. She was born in Abnegation and her father is one of the council members of Abnegation. Susan is Tris's neighbor and grew up together until the choosing ceremony. Her brother Robert transfers to Amity during the Choosing Ceremony. She has blond hair.

In Divergent, she appears to have a crush on Caleb Prior, which he reciprocates. In Insurgent, she meets Tris, Caleb and Four at Amity, having survived the Dauntless attack on Abnegation. During the attack on Amity, she escapes with Tris, Four and Caleb and meets the factionless on the train. Later she and Caleb move towards the safe zone, where the surviving Abnegation are living.

Susan does not appear in the film series.

==== Mr. Black ====
Mr. Black
- The Divergent trilogy character
- First appearance: Divergent
- Last appearance: Insurgent (mentioned only)
- Created by: Veronica Roth

In-universe information
- Gender: Male
- Family: Susan Black (daughter); Robert Black (son)
- Original faction: Abnegation
- Faction: Abnegation

Mr. Black is one of the council members of Abnegation. He has a daughter, Susan Black, and a son, Robert Black. He is the neighbor of the Priors. He uses his car to work around the city and also drives his children to and from school every day. He occasionally offers to drive the Prior siblings as well, but they always politely turn down his offer as they would not want to inconvenience anyone.

In Divergent, he gets killed by the Dauntless during their attack on Abnegation sector.

==== Erin ====
Erin
- The Divergent trilogy character
- First appearance: Divergent
- Created by: Veronica Roth

In-universe information
- Gender: Female
- Faction: Abnegation

Erin is a member of Abnegation faction. She works with Natalie Prior and informs her about a student who got sick during the Aptitude Test.

==== Tessa ====
Tessa
- The Divergent trilogy character
- First appearance: Divergent
- Created by: Veronica Roth

In-universe information
- Gender: Female
- Faction: Abnegation

Tessa is a member of Abnegation faction. She is the wife of an Abnegation council member and lives down the street from the Prior family. She also arrives at the safe house during the attack on Abnegation.

=== Erudite ===
Erudite is one of five factions in the Divergent trilogy and is dedicated to knowledge, intelligence, curiosity, and astuteness. The Erudite symbol is 'The Curious Eye' and the element is water to show their elegance. Their chosen color is blue. It was formed on the principle that lack of knowledge and ignorance is the cause of human problems. Their leader is Jeanine Matthews.

==== Cara ====
Cara
- The Divergent trilogy character
- First appearance: Divergent (novel)
- Last appearance: Allegiant
- Created by: Veronica Roth

In-universe information
- Gender: Female
- Family: Will (brother)
- Original faction: Erudite
- Faction: Erudite

Cara is a member of Erudite. She was born in Erudite along with her younger brother, Will, who later transfers to Dauntless. She also worked with Jeanine to develop a longer-lasting serum before the latter became the leader of Erudite. She has golden hair and a crease between her eyebrows like her brother.

In Divergent, Cara comes to visit Will at Dauntless sector on Visiting Day and insults Tris and Natalie after finding out that they are from Abnegation. On her rudeness, Tris threatens to punch her, but Will defends his sister while Natalie pulls her daughter away.

In Insurgent, Cara arrives at Candor with Erudite and Dauntless traitors, but she and Fernando help the group of loyal Dauntless against them and Eric. She has changed her mind after watching an Abnegation woman get killed during a mission. Cara also comforts Christina about Will's death and explains to her that it was not Tris's fault and she had no other choice but to kill Will, who was completely under simulation control and who would have killed her. As she has become persona non grata in Erudite, Tris tells her to seek sanctuary in Amity. Later, she accompanies Tris and Marcus to infiltrate the Erudite headquarters.

In Allegiant, Cara becomes a co-leader of Allegiant, former faction members who rebel against the factionless to restore their old way of life. She participates in the escape from Chicago to discover more about their surroundings and arrives at the Bureau of Genetic Welfare. She stays at the compound while Four, Christina, Peter, and Amar go back to Chicago to save the citizens from the memory serum. Cara later informs Four of Tris' death while attempting to expose the memory serum on the Bureau members. In the epilogue, Cara is working as part of the agricultural sector of Chicago, which develops new methods of farming for the increased number of residents in the city. She is dating Matthew, as revealed in the We Can Be Mended short story.

Cara does not appear in the film series.

==== Fernando ====
Fernando
- The Divergent trilogy character
- First appearance: Insurgent
- Last appearance: Insurgent
- Created by: Veronica Roth

In-universe information
- Gender: Male
- Original faction: Erudite
- Faction: Erudite

Fernando is a member of Erudite faction. He and Cara switch their loyalties when they find out about Jeanine Matthews' plans. He describes Caleb Prior as brilliant, but one of those Erudites who completely believe whatever Jeanine Matthews said.

In Insurgent, he arrives with Cara and other Erudite at Candor, but both of them help Dauntless instead. They also show prototype gadgets to Dauntless and even lets Cara use a stunner on him. He later called Tris an insurgent and says that he enjoys categorization. He flirts with Christina when she calls him "Nando" but this upsets her as she is still mourning Will. During the invasion mission, he is the last person to climb the ladder as he was holding onto the other end for the others. He climbs slowly and in the middle his glasses fall down, the mind controlled Candor below fire and shoot him in his leg. He tells Christina and others not to waste time for him and complete their mission. Later it is implied that he is killed by Candor gunfire.

Fernando does not appear in the film series.

=== Dauntless ===
Dauntless is one of the five factions in the world of Divergent and it is dedicated to courage, bravery, and fearlessness. It was formed on the principle that cowardice and fear are the causes of human problems. Their chosen color is black, and all members wear black clothes. Most members also sport tattoos, piercings and unusual hair colors. Lit coal represents it at the Choosing Ceremony.

==== Will ====
Will
- The Divergent trilogy character
- First appearance: Divergent
- Last appearance: Allegiant(Mentioned Only)
- Created by: Veronica Roth
- Portrayed by: Ben Lloyd-Hughes

In-universe information
- Gender: Male
- Family: Cara (sister)
- Original faction: Erudite
- Faction: Dauntless

Will is a member of Dauntless faction. He was born in Erudite but later transfers to Dauntless. He is one of Tris's close friends during initiation. He has pale green eyes, blond shaggy hair and a crease between his eyebrows just like his sister Cara. He is in a relationship with Christina which ends with his death. He has memorized a map of the city and also read the manifestos of all of the different factions. He is the one who tells Tris of the phrase in the dauntless manifestos "We believe in ordinary acts of bravery and the courage that drives one person to stand up for another".

In Divergent, he, Tris, Christina, and Al form a tight friendship as fellow transfers in Dauntless, with Will eventually begin dating Christina. During the Visiting Day, his sister, Cara, comes to meet and on finding out that Tris and her mother are from Abnegation, she insults them. Will defends his sister when Tris threatens to punch her. During the sparring training Al knocks him out and in his next fight, he defeats Christina. During Capture the Flag, Four chooses him as one of his team members. He comes third for the first stage of initiation. He, Christina and Al do not like Tris's friendship with Dauntless-born initiates. He also calms down Tris when Molly told lies about Tris to an Erudite reporter. He also tells Tris that the simulations that they are in are not real but just in their minds, which helps her break through her simulation. He along with others walk out on Tris, after she comes in first the second stage of initiation and when Peter accused her of manipulating others to believe her to be weak and then snatching the victory right under their noses. After Peter, Al and Drew's attack on Tris, he along with Christina reconcile with her and is shocked to hear about Al's involvement in the attack. He along with most other Dauntless are controlled under the Erudite-developed simulation serum, which leads him to follow Tris. When she does not have any other choice, she has to shoot him in self-defense, which she regrets very much.

In Insurgent, Tris sees him during a fear simulation, in the defense room to the lab of Jeanine Matthews. She shoots him again in order to pass.

Ben Lloyd-Hughes plays Will in the 2014 Divergent and the 2015 The Divergent Series: Insurgent films.

==== Uriah Pedrad ====
Uriah Pedrad
- The Divergent trilogy character
- First appearance: Divergent
- Last appearance: Allegiant
- Created by: Veronica Roth
- Portrayed by: Keiynan Lonsdale

In-universe information
- Gender: Male
- Family: Unnamed (father); Hana (mother); Zeke (brother)
- Original faction: Dauntless
- Faction: Dauntless

Uriah Pedrad is a Dauntless-born member and a Divergent. He has an older brother Zeke, also in Dauntless. He is close friends with other Dauntless-born Marlene and Lynn and later starts a relationship with Marlene which ends with her death. He is also friends with Tris. He is described as tall and handsome and has black eyes with bronze skin. Against his skin his smile looks white. He also has a tattoo of a snake behind his ear, its tail curls around his earlobe and another tattoo right above the waistband of his pants.

In Divergent, he appears during the game of Capture the Flag and Four selects him in his team. Later on the train back to Dauntless, he makes acquaintances with Tris by squirting a paintball in her face and talks to her along with Marlene. He also invites Tris to join him and other Dauntless-born initiates for an initiation ritual and after that she becomes friend with Uriah and some other Dauntless-born initiates. Christina, Al, and Will do not take Tris's friendship with them well. He later invites Tris to training room to celebrate after she comes first in the second stage of initiation. He bets with Marlene to shoot a muffin off her head without her flinching, which they both win. He also argues with Will two times.

In Insurgent, he meets Tris and others at Candor with Marlene and Lynn. When Eric attacks Candor and release a new serum which does not affect Divergent, it does not knock out him like others and Tris finds out that he is Divergent like her. When Zeke and Tori return and reveal that they were actually spying on Erudite, he does not show surprise because he and Shauna already knew their plan. He and Marlene start flirting with each other, which irritates Lynn. At the Dauntless compound, she tells them to just come out with their relationship and in answer to her, Marlene kisses him. He becomes greatly depressed, when Marlene becomes the victim of the new serum of Jeanine Matthews (which Eric releases at Candor) by killing herself. He later strongly opposes the idea of surrendering any Divergent to Erudite for the safety of those who are containing the serum in their bodies. He escorts Tris down after Tori accuses her of being a traitor but does not act differently or negatively to her and tells her that he had to shoot many people to get inside the building. Lynn gets shot in the stomach and is carried to the floor he and Tris are in. He brings a doctor for her but could not save her. Before dying Lynn reveals to him that she was in love with Marlene.

In Allegiant, he is part of the group sent by the Allegiant to explore the fringes, alongside Tris, Four, Christina, Peter, Cara, and Tori, and arrives at the Bureau of Genetic Welfare. During Nita's rebellion, Uriah is seriously injured by a bomb and enters persistent vegetative state. Tobias, who set the bomb, blames himself for this as he previously promised Zeke that he would protect Uriah. The Bureau originally want to turn off his life support straight away but Christina pleads with them to extend it for four days, so Uriah's family can be informed. He dies towards the end of the book and his family (mother and his brother) are with him as he gets unplugged. Uriah's body is then cremated with his ashes scattered by Zeke and Hana down The Chasm, as the epilogue reveals.

Keiynan Lonsdale plays Uriah in the 2015 film The Divergent Series: Insurgent and the 2016 The Divergent Series: Allegiant. His role as one of Tris' closest friends is cut in the films, as is his love triangle with Lynn and Marlene.

==== Al ====
Al
- The Divergent trilogy character
- First appearance: Divergent
- Last appearance: Insurgent (mentioned only)
- Created by: Veronica Roth
- Portrayed by: Christian Madsen

In-universe information
- Gender: Male
- Family: Unnamed (father); Unnamed (mother)
- Original faction: Candor
- Faction: Dauntless

Al (full name: Albert) was born in Candor. He chooses Dauntless at the Choosing Ceremony. He does not like to hurt people but chooses Dauntless because he and his parents admire bravery. He is described as largest and broadest of all the initiates and a bit clumsy. His eyes are very dark brown in color with thick eyebrows and a kind face. He gets a tattoo of a spider on his arm during Dauntless initiation.

In Divergent, during his first night, he cries himself to sleep. He later becomes friends with Tris, Christina and Will. During the sparring training, he unwillingly defeats Will. Al helps Christina against Eric's orders, when Eric forces her to hang over the chasm. When sparring for the second time, he loses to Drew on purpose because he does not want to fight anymore and later he also is defeated in the same way by Christina. During the knife throwing activity, Al is the only initiate who has not hit the target, even after a half hour. Eric orders him to collect his knives while the other are still throwing, putting him in their line of fire. When Al refuses to do so, Eric makes him stand in front of the target while Four throws knives at him until he stops flinching, but Tris stands up for him and takes his place in front of the target. He does not show up to meet his parents during the Visiting Day even though they look for him. He also develops feelings for Tris. When she asks him why he is hiding from his parents, he tells her that he does not want to disappoint them. He makes a subtle move on her but she politely turns him down. Once the second stage of initiation starts he often cries during his sleep and wakes up screaming. He becomes sad and hurt after Tris's refusal and in his jealousy and anger he joins Peter. He along with Peter and Drew kidnaps and attacks Tris and hangs her over the chasm, but he and Peter run away when Four arrives. He deeply regrets what he did to Tris and apologizes to her but she refuses to forgive him. He commits suicide by throwing himself into the chasm. At his funeral, Eric calls his suicide courageous but Tris disagrees with him, as does Four.

Christian Madsen plays Al in the 2014 Divergent film.

==== Marlene ====
Marlene
- The Divergent trilogy character
- First appearance: Divergent
- Last appearance: Insurgent
- Created by: Veronica Roth
- Portrayed by: Suki Waterhouse

In-universe information
- Gender: Female
- Original faction: Dauntless
- Faction: Dauntless

Marlene is a Dauntless-born. She is close friends with other Dauntless-born Uriah and Lynn. She also starts a relationship with Uriah which ends with her death. She is also good friends with Tris. She is described as having a flirtatious smile.

In Divergent, she first appears during the game of Capture the Flag. She is in Four's team and tries to convince him to reveal a good place to hide the flag. She talks to Tris on the train back to Dauntless and compliments her on successful plan and her decision to climb Ferris wheel to find the other team's flag by calling it "Erudite-smart". She meets Tris again when Uriah invites Tris to join him and other Dauntless-born initiates for an initiation ritual and after that she becomes friend with them. She bets with Uriah to shoot a muffin off her head and she will not flinch as he shoots, which they both win while Lynn and Tris watch, but are caught in the act by Zeke and Four who kick them out of the room.

In Insurgent, she meets the other loyal Dauntless at Candor with Uriah and Lynn. During his attack on Candor, Eric releases new a serum which lasts longer and Marlene with others is affected by it. During this time she and Uriah start flirting with each other and when Lynn snaps at them for not admitting their relationship, she kisses Uriah and starts a relationship with him. But soon she along with Hector and Kee get under the simulation's control. She delivers the Erudite message that until a Divergent- Tris- is given to Erudite, more people will die every two days. After that she jumps off the roof and kills herself under the influence of the serum. Tori and Tris manage to save the other two, including Christina, before they jump. After the attack at Erudite headquarters, Lynn gets shot in the stomach and before dying reveals to Uriah and Tris that she was in love with Marlene.

Suki Waterhouse plays Marlene in the 2015 film The Divergent Series: Insurgent. In the film, Marlene's role as one of Tris' fellow initiates and love triangle with Uriah and Lynn are not mentioned, and she appears mainly during her suicide scene.

==== Lynn ====
Lynn
- The Divergent trilogy character
- First appearance: Divergent
- Last appearance: Insurgent
- Created by: Veronica Roth
- Portrayed by: Rosa Salazar

In-universe information
- Gender: Female
- Family: Unnamed (mother); Shauna (sister); Hector (brother)
- Original faction: Dauntless
- Faction: Dauntless

Lynn is a Dauntless-born. She is close friends with other Dauntless-born Uriah and Marlene. She is in love with Marlene but does not tell her. She initially is not very fond of Tris but later becomes good friends with her. She has an elder sister Shauna and a younger brother Hector. She initially has a shaved head but later her hair grows back. She has a ring in her eyebrow and her eyes are golden-brown color.

In Divergent, she first meets Tris when she steps on her foot. Later during the game of Capture the Flag, she is in Four's team along with Tris and others. She meets Tris again when Uriah invites Tris to join him and other Dauntless-born initiates for an initiation ritual. She also talks to her during Uriah and Marlene's bets to shoot a muffin off Marlene's head without her flinching.

In Insurgent, she meets other loyal Dauntless at Candor with Uriah and Marlene. She secretly observes along with Tris, Four and Shauna a meeting between Candor representative Jack and Max who comes as a representative of Erudite, he demands that Candor hand over Eric along with the Divergent, and those has not injected with the new serum injection. Lynn shoots Max in the chest and during the escape Shauna gets shot in the back and becomes paralyzed waist-down for which Shauna blames herself. She also snaps at Marlene and Uriah when they start flirting with each other because she loves Marlene but to her dismay they start a relationship. Later Marlene kills herself under the control of simulation but her brother Hector, along with Christina, get saved by Tris and Tori. She gets shot in the stomach during the attack at Erudite headquarters and before dying reveals to Uriah and Tris that she was in love with Marlene.

Rosa Salazar plays Lynn in the 2015 film The Divergent Series: Insurgent. Lynn's role as one of Tris' fellow initiates and love triangle go unmentioned in the film, though the film does briefly suggests her relationship with Marlene.

==== Max ====
Max
- The Divergent trilogy character
- First appearance: Divergent
- Last appearance: Insurgent
- Created by: Veronica Roth
- Portrayed by: Mekhi Phifer

In-universe information
- Gender: Male
- Original faction: Dauntless
- Faction: Dauntless

Max is a member of Dauntless faction. He was the Dauntless leader but later appointed Eric leader on Jeanine Matthews' orders. He wanted Four as the leader of Dauntless and offered him the position but Four turned down his offer. Under Eric's suggestion, he was also the one who changed the training methods of Dauntless, making them more brutal to test the strength of initiates. He has black eyes and gray hairs at his temples.

In Divergent, he first appears on the train roof at the beginning of Dauntless initiation and tells the initiates that they have to jump off the moving train on the roof to get at the Dauntless compound. He along with others watches the simulation initiation. He also does not get put under simulation control to attack Abnegation by Erudite. In Insurgent, he meets with Candor representative Jack as a representative of Erudite. He demands that Candor hand over Eric along with the Divergent, and those not injected with the new serum injection. Tris, Four, Lynn, and Shauna secretly observes the meeting but Tris realizes that Jeanine is near and telling Max what to say through an earpiece. As they try to search for Jeanine, Lynn moves away from them and shoots Max in the chest.

Mekhi Phifer plays Max in the 2014 Divergent, 2015 The Divergent Series: Insurgent, and 2016 The Divergent Series: Allegiant films. As Lynn's role is cut, instead of dying in Insurgent, Max dies in Allegiant, when he is captured by the factionless and becomes the first person to be executed for his crimes by Edgar.

==== Lauren ====
Lauren
- The Divergent trilogy character
- First appearance: Divergent
- Created by: Veronica Roth
- Portrayed by: Justine Wachsberger

In-universe information
- Gender: Female
- Original faction: Dauntless
- Faction: Dauntless

Lauren is a member of Dauntless faction. She serves as the instructor for Dauntless-born Initiates. She is described as having black hair. She has many piercings including a lip piercing, one in her ear from top to bottom and three silver rings through her right eyebrow.

In Divergent, she welcomes Tris along with Four after Tris lands at the Dauntless compound after jumping from the roof. During the second stage of initiation involving simulation, initiations have to pass through her "fear landscape" which consists of spiders, suffocation, walls that slowly close and trap you in, getting thrown out of Dauntless, bleeding uncontrollably, getting run over by a train, her father being killed, public humiliation, and kidnapping by men without faces.

Justine Wachsberger plays Lauren in the 2014 Divergent and the 2015 The Divergent Series: Insurgent films.

==== Zeke Pedrad ====
Ezekiel 'Zeke' Pedrad
- The Divergent trilogy character
- First appearance: The Transfer
- Created by: Veronica Roth

In-universe information
- Gender: Male
- Family: Unnamed (father); Hana (mother); Uriah (brother)
- Original faction: Dauntless
- Faction: Dauntless

Ezekiel "Zeke" Pedrad is a Dauntless-born member of Dauntless faction. He has a younger brother Uriah, also in Dauntless. He is friends with Four and Shauna. He and Uriah look completely different from each other except they have a similar skin color. He is slightly shorter than Uriah but faster and stronger than him.

In Four: A Divergent Collection, he is Four's fellow initiates and together with Shauna becomes one of his first real friends in his life. Four finds him as a fun, yet insensitive, person and generally enjoys his company. Zeke is totally oblivious to Shauna's crush on him and continues with his playboy attitude until she states her feelings sometime in the two-year-interim between "The Son" and "The Traitor", after which Four notes that the two are growing closer.

In Divergent, when Uriah invites Tris to join him and other Dauntless-born initiates for an initiation ritual, there she also meets Zeke who helps her and other with harnesses for ziplining off the Hancock Building. In Insurgent, he and Tori arrive at Candor and it is revealed that they were working as spies among Erudite and Dauntless traitors but when their secret was revealed they escape to Candor to join the other loyal Dauntless. Uriah and Shauna knew about their plan already. He also helps Shauna, when she gets paralyzed from the waist down from a gunshot wound. In Allegiant, he stays in the city to rebel against Evelyn and the Factionless. He and Hana are next to Uriah as the Bureau remove his life support at the end of the book. In the epilogue, Zeke is working as a police officer and, alongside Four, Christina, Caleb, Cara, and Matthew celebrate Choosing Day by riding a zipline. In We Can Be Mended, it is revealed that he and Shauna are expecting a child.

Zeke does not appear in the film adaptations.

==== Shauna ====
Shauna
- The Divergent trilogy character
- First appearance: Divergent
- Created by: Veronica Roth

In-universe information
- Gender: Female
- Family: Unnamed (mother); Lynn (sister); Hector (brother)
- Original faction: Dauntless
- Faction: Dauntless

Shauna is a Dauntless-born member of Dauntless faction. She is friends with Four and Zeke. She has a younger sister Lynn and a younger brother Hector. She was Four's fellow initiate. She does not trust Divergent because according to her they cannot be loyal to one faction due to their Divergence. According to Lynn, Shauna's opinion on Divergent comes from their mother.

In Four: A Divergent Collection, Shauna is one of Four's fellow initiates and becomes one of his closest friends. Four first learns about Dauntless' generally open lifestyle when Shauna casually embraces him as thanks for teaching her how to fight. She has a crush on Zeke, which he is totally oblivious with. She becomes glad when he breaks up with Maria and Four notes after the timeskip that the two are growing closer than before.

In Divergent, Shauna first meets Tris when Uriah invites Tris to join him and other Dauntless-born initiates for an initiation ritual by saying that Four talks about her. She later explains to Tris that she was in Four's initiate class and he taught her how to fight. In Insurgent, Shauna shares her opinion on Divergent when Dauntless find out that Erudite wants Divergent in exchange of peace. She secretly observes along with Tris, Four and Lynn a meeting between Candor representative Jack and Max who comes as a representative of Erudite. Lynn shoots Max in the chest and during the escape Shauna gets shot in the back and becomes paralyzed, after which she uses a wheelchair. Due to this, Shauna does not participate in the attack on the Erudite compound in search for information hidden away by Erudite. In the epilogue of Allegiant, it is revealed that Caleb makes her some leg braces in order to walk and function normally. By the events of We Can Be Mended, Shauna and Zeke are expecting a child.

Shauna does not appear in the film series.

==== Hector ====
Hector
- The Divergent trilogy character
- First appearance: Insurgent
- Created by: Veronica Roth
- Portrayed by: Emjay Anthony

In-universe information
- Gender: Male
- Family: Unnamed (mother); Shauna (sister); Lynn (sister)
- Faction: Dauntless

Hector is the youngest of three children with his older sisters, Shauna and Lynn. In Insurgent, Hector is present in Candor during a meeting with other Dauntless members and gets injected with a new serum released by Dauntless-traitor, Eric. The serum was developed by Erudite and allows them to control whoever is injected with it; they plan to make Dauntless members kill themselves every two days unless a Divergent is handed over. Under simulation, Hector, Marlene, and Kee attempt to jump off a building. He is saved by Tris and Christina, alongside Kee, though the two are unable to prevent Marlene from falling to her death.

Emjay Anthony plays Hector in the film The Divergent Series: Insurgent.

==== Harrison ====
Harrison
- The Divergent trilogy character
- First appearance: Insurgent
- Created by: Veronica Roth

In-universe information
- Gender: Male
- Faction: Dauntless

Harrison is the member of Dauntless faction.

In Insurgent, he becomes the leader of Dauntless along with Four and Tori. He is described as having a blond ponytail.

==== Bud ====
Bud
- The Divergent trilogy character
- First appearance: Divergent
- Created by: Veronica Roth

In-universe information
- Gender: Male
- Faction: Dauntless

Bud is one of the older members of Dauntless faction. He works in the Dauntless tattoo parlor with Tori.

In Divergent, he appears when Tris goes to meet Tori at the parlor but he does not notice Tris as he is drawing a tattoo of lion on a man's arm. In Insurgent, he volunteers to guard Jack Kang during his meeting with Erudite so that he can eavesdrop and collect information to share with other Dauntless. He is the first person who calls for Eric's execution. When the loyal Dauntless get back to their compound, he also hands out paintball guns to fire at the hidden cameras at Dauntless compound.

==== Gabe ====
Gabe
- The Divergent trilogy character
- First appearance: Divergent
- Created by: Veronica Roth

In-universe information
- Gender: Male
- Faction: Dauntless

Gabe is a member of Dauntless faction. He is described as having a metal ring between his nostrils.

In Divergent, he appears when Uriah invites Tris to join him and other Dauntless-born initiates for an initiation ritual.

==== Rita ====
Rita
- The Divergent trilogy character
- First appearance: Divergent
- Created by: Veronica Roth

In-universe information
- Gender: Female
- Family: Unnamed sister
- Original faction: Dauntless
- Faction: Dauntless

Rita is the Dauntless-born who later choose Dauntless as her faction.

In Divergent, she first appears when Tris sees her during the beginning of initiation on the train roof crying while a Dauntless boy holds her back because her sister fell down and died during the jump from the moving train and on to the roof.

==== Kee ====
Kee
- The Divergent trilogy character
- First appearance: Insurgent
- Last appearance: Insurgent
- Created by: Veronica Roth

In-universe information
- Gender: Female
- Faction: Dauntless

Kee is a member of Dauntless. She is described as looking no more than seven years of age.

In Insurgent, she is injected with the new serum developed by Erudite during the Dauntless meeting in Candor and under its influence attempts to commit suicide by jumping off a building. She is rescued by Tris and Christina, who also manage to save Hector, though the two are unable to stop Marlene in time before her death.

In The Divergent Series: Insurgent, Kee does not appear and her role as one of the mind-controlled Dauntless members is replaced by Christina (whose role in the book is in turn given to Tori).

==== Hana Pedrad ====
Hana Pedrad
- The Divergent trilogy character
- First appearance: Allegiant
- Last appearance: Allegiant
- Created by: Veronica Roth

In-universe information
- Gender: Female
- Family: Unnamed (husband); Zeke (son); Uriah (son)
- Original faction: Dauntless
- Faction: Dauntless

Hana Pedrad is a senior member of Dauntless and the mother of Uriah and Zeke. She is mentioned several times before her introduction as having to take care of the two boys alone after her husband died due to the pressure put on him by the Dauntless law to retire. Despite her short stature, Four describes her as having an immediate authority on people around her. In Allegiant, Four, Christina, Peter, and Amar personally visit her residence to inquire about Uriah's brain damage, to which Hana requests for her and Zeke be allowed to see him one last time before his life support is plugged off. She later scatters his ashes down The Chasm.

=== Candor ===
Candor is one of the five factions in the world of Divergent and it is dedicated to honesty. It was formed on the principle that dishonesty and deception is the cause of human problems. Their chosen color is black and white to represent that truth as black and white only. Glass represents it at the Choosing Ceremony.

==== Jack Kang ====
Jack Kang
- The Divergent trilogy character
- First appearance: Insurgent
- Created by: Veronica Roth
- Portrayed by: Daniel Dae Kim

In-universe information
- Gender: Male
- Faction: Candor

Jack Kang is the leader of Candor.

In Insurgent, he attempts to negotiate for peace with Erudite leader Jeanine, who sends Dauntless-traitor Max in her place. At the meeting, Max taunts him, explaining that Candor is a non-essential faction and thus has no bargaining power. He later acquiesces to Erudite's demands.

Daniel Dae Kim plays Jack Kang in the 2015 film The Divergent Series: Insurgent and the 2016 The Divergent Series: Allegiant.

==== James Tucker ====
James Tucker
- The Divergent trilogy character
- First appearance: Divergent
- Created by: Veronica Roth

In-universe information
- Gender: Male
- Original faction: Dauntless
- Faction: Candor

James Tucker was born in Dauntless but later chooses Candor as his faction. During the choosing ceremony in Divergent, he is the second person to choose a faction and is also the first transfer. He almost falls down on his way to the bowls at the ceremony.

==== Rose ====
Rose
- The Divergent trilogy character
- First appearance: Divergent
- Last appearance: Allegiant
- Created by: Veronica Roth

In-universe information
- Gender: Female
- Family: Stephanie (mother); Christina (sister)
- Faction: Candor

Rose is a young member of Candor and Christina's younger sister who has yet to receive her Aptitude Test.

Rose visits Christina during the Visiting Day together with her mother in Divergent. In Allegiant, Rose is present during the meeting of the Allegiant that Tris attends, in which she bluntly tells Tris that she murdered Christina's boyfriend, Will. Although Christina has already forgiven Tris, Rose is still skeptical, causing Christina to scold her while herding Tris away from her. Later, worrying that her family would forget her should the memory serum ever be spread, Christina decides to inject them with the memory antiserum, which she is successful with.

==== Bobby ====
Bobby
- The Divergent trilogy character
- First appearance: Insurgent
- Last appearance: Insurgent
- Created by: Veronica Roth

In-universe information
- Gender: Male
- Faction: Candor

Bobby is a young boy and a member of Candor. He is approximately ten years old. Bobby is also a Divergent, a fact not known prior to the Dauntless' infiltration of Candor, led by Eric, who releases a serum capable of incapacitating anyone who is not a Divergent. Bobby is one of the only three who remain conscious, alongside Tris and Uriah, but because of his mental immaturity that renders him useless for Jeanine's experiments, Eric executes him.

In The Divergent Series: Insurgent, Bobby's role is replaced by an unnamed Candor girl portrayed by Callie McClincy. Unlike Bobby's fate in the book, the girl is spared from Eric's execution thanks to Tris' intervention.

=== Amity ===
Amity is one of the five factions in the world of Divergent, and it is dedicated to peace. It was formed on the principle that war and fighting are the causes of human problems. Their chosen color is red, and they wear red and yellow color clothes. Soil represents it at the Choosing Ceremony.

==== Robert Black ====
Robert Black
- The Divergent trilogy character
- First appearance: Divergent
- Created by: Veronica Roth

In-universe information
- Gender: Male
- Family: Mr. Black (father); Susan Black (sister)
- Original faction: Abnegation
- Faction: Amity

Robert Black is a member of Amity faction. He was born in Abnegation sector to a council member. His family were the Priors' neighbors in Abnegation. He, along with his sister, Susan, grew up with Tris and Caleb. He is described as having curly blond hair, and his nose is wide at the tip and narrow at the bridge.

In Divergent, he meets Tris after the Choosing Ceremony, when she, along with the Dauntless, makes a trip to the fence and calls her by her real name, Beatrice. He along with other Amity members are delivering apples into the city. He hugs Tris and, after seeing the bruises on her face, tells her that Dauntless do not seem friendly. Molly, who spots them together, starts making fun of them. In Insurgent, Susan mentions him to Tris that she and Robert have grieved for their parents' deaths separately with their own factions. He later appears when Tris, Christina and Marcus ask Amity for help and he with other Amity and Abnegation members go to the Erudite compound to save defenseless and innocent Erudite members during the attack of Dauntless and factionless.

Both of the Black siblings do not appear in the film series.

==== Johanna Reyes ====
Johanna Reyes
- The Divergent trilogy character
- First appearance: Insurgent
- Created by: Veronica Roth
- Portrayed by: Octavia Spencer

In-universe information
- Gender: Female
- Original faction: Candor
- Faction: Amity

Johanna Reyes was born in Candor but later transfers to Amity. She serves as Amity's representative, since they do not believe in having a formal leader. She is described as having a long scar from her eye to her chin, causing blindness in one eye and also a lisp. She appears to be fond of Marcus Eaton.

In Insurgent, she lies to Erudite and Dauntless traitors during their attack on Amity to capture Abnegation survivors and loyal Dauntless by denying their presence at Amity. Before their invasion at the Erudite compound, Marcus, Tris and Christina asks Amity for help. She arranges a meeting and asks Amity members to reconsider their decision to remain neutral. She asserts that they must save the innocent Erudite during the attack or all their knowledge will be dead with them. When Amity members still do not change their decision then she says that she does not want Amity faction to be divided but she will go with Tris's group to protect innocent Erudite and those who want to can join her. Some Amity members join her including Robert Black. She is sent back to Amity by Tori after the attack on Erudite with an apparent message that Amity are not part of the new political system due to their neutrality during the war. She hints at the factionless' real motives before leaving.

In Allegiant, Johanna has become the co-leader of Allegiant, a rebel group determined to restore the faction system in Chicago. Her role in the group necessitates her to hold a gun at all times, which becomes one of the book's running gags, as others, even Evelyn, express their amazement that even an Amity would easily take up arms if necessary. During the war between Allegiant and the factionless, she and Marcus meet with Four and the now-changed Evelyn to stop the war altogether and free the society from confinement.

In the epilogue, Four states that Johanna is serving as one of Chicago's council members, with him serving as her protege.

Octavia Spencer plays Johanna Reyes in the 2015 film The Divergent Series: Insurgent, as well as the 2016 The Divergent Series: Allegiant.

==== Danielle Pohler ====
Danielle Pohler
- The Divergent trilogy character
- First appearance: Divergent
- Created by: Veronica Roth

In-universe information
- Gender: Female
- Original faction: Amity
- Faction: Unknown

Danielle Pohler is an Amity-born who stands to one side of Tris during the Choosing Ceremony. She is described by Tris as wearing a yellow dress and has red cheeks.

== Recurring characters ==
=== Factionless ===
Factionless is a term, referring to those who are not part of any faction. They either were born outside of the faction system, do not agree with the faction system, or were unable to complete their initiation into their chosen faction. They are the abjective, marginalized part of the faction society. According to Evelyn Johnson-Eaton, the factionless population is twice the size of the Dauntless population.

==== Evelyn Johnson-Eaton ====
Evelyn Johnson-Eaton
- The Divergent trilogy character
- First appearance: The Transfer
- Created by: Veronica Roth
- Portrayed by: Naomi Watts

In-universe information
- Gender: Female
- Family: Marcus Eaton (Former husband); Tobias "Four" Eaton (son)
- Original faction: Erudite
- Faction: Factionless

Evelyn Johnson-Eaton is the leader of the factionless. She is Tobias’s mother. She was born in Erudite but realizes that she is not smart enough for Erudite even before her initiation test. She chooses Abnegation as her faction and marries Marcus Eaton. During their marriage Marcus abuses her and eventually she had an affair and left their son with Marcus. Marcus fakes her death but she contacts Four after his transfer into Dauntless, according to Four their meeting was not a happy one. She and Tris do not see eye to eye and Tris does not trust her because she left Four with Marcus despite knowing his abusive nature. She is described as having dark hair and eyes, distinct olive skin, strong angular features and appears middle-aged. While Four physically resembles his father, he inherits his personality from Evelyn, including being a bit paranoid and highly aware as well as preferring to be left alone.

In Insurgent, Tris, Four, and several others board the Amity train to the factionless safe zone and have an audience with Evelyn. She convinces Four to make Dauntless join with the factionless to defeat Erudite and form a new government system. After the attack on Erudite, she deceives Four and the factionless take control of all weapons and announce the government of factionless. In Allegiant, Evelyn has become the new head of the Chicago society, disbanded the faction system, and forced all former faction members to operate under her command and live equally with the factionless. Her decision prompts the former faction members to form "Allegiant", a rebel group determined to restore their old way of life. During the war between Allegiant and the factionless, Four gives his mother the option to drink the memory serum, so she may be born anew and become his mother again. Realizing what she has done, Evelyn embraces Four yet does not drink the serum, then announces her intention to end the conflict.

In the epilogue, Evelyn returns from her two years of self-exile and reunites with her son, who happily embraces her.

Naomi Watts plays Evelyn in the 2015 film The Divergent Series: Insurgent and the 2016 The Divergent Series: Allegiant. In the Insurgent film, Evelyn, instead of Tori, is the one who ultimately kills Jeanine after the latter's arrest. In the Allegiant film, she is convinced by Peter to use the memory serum gas on her enemies. But Four tells her the memory serum gas will wipe the memories of everyone involved, including him, and he won't remember her as his mother. Evelyn changes her mind and tries to stop the gas, but is shot by Peter. But she survives and reconciles with her son and Tris.

==== Molly Atwood ====
Molly Atwood
- The Divergent trilogy character
- First appearance: Divergent
- Created by: Veronica Roth
- Portrayed by: Amy Newbold

In-universe information
- Gender: Female
- Original faction: Candor
- Faction: Factionless

Molly Atwood (alias The Tank) is factionless. She was born in Candor but chooses Dauntless as her faction. She is enemies with Tris and along with Peter and Drew, always taunts or make fun of her. She is described as having dark eyes and hair with light skin. She is also tall and has broad shoulders.

In Divergent, she fights Christina during the sparring training and brutally beats her up but during her second time, her opponent Edward defeats her. She makes fun of Tris and Robert Black and tells Tris that she should go back to Abnegation. Later she gets beat up by Tris until she is bloody. To take revenge on Tris, she tells lies to an Erudite reporter about Tris and her father Andrew. She becomes factionless due to her low ranking in initiation. In Insurgent, it is revealed that she and Drew tried to join the factionless division in which Edward is in, but Drew gets beat up by him.

Amy Newbold plays Molly Atwood in the 2014 Divergent film. She is not mentioned to have been expelled from Dauntless (though it is likely due to her extreme trauma over the second initiation test) and does not appear in the sequel.

==== Drew ====
Drew
- The Divergent trilogy character
- First appearance: Divergent
- Created by: Veronica Roth

In-universe information
- Gender: Male
- Original faction: Candor
- Faction: Factionless

Drew is factionless. He was born in Candor but chose Dauntless as his faction. According to Christina, he, Peter and Molly were inseparable since birth. He, along with Peter and Molly, are enemies with Tris. He has orange-red hair, which resembles the color of a carrot. He is built like a boulder but in height he is shorter than Peter and Molly. Also he laughs silently, which makes him look like he is in pain.

In Divergent, he along with Peter and Al kidnap Tris and try to kill her by hanging her over the chasm. He gets a low ranking in the final results of initiation and becomes factionless along with Molly. In Insurgent, it is revealed that he and Molly tried to join the factionless division in which Edward is in, but he gets beat up by Edward and barely makes it alive.

Drew does not appear in the film series.

==== Myra ====
Myra
- The Divergent trilogy character
- First appearance: Divergent
- Created by: Veronica Roth

In-universe information
- Gender: Female
- Original faction: Erudite
- Faction: Factionless

Myra was born in Erudite but chooses Dauntless as her faction along with her boyfriend Edward, although it is implied she does not actually have aptitude for Dauntless. She has mousy brown color hair.

In Divergent, she is shown as a weak fighter as she lost her fight against Will in three minutes, and also loses to Tris. After the results of stage one of initiation comes and Edward is announced first, he gets stabbed in the eye with knife by Peter in jealousy. After that, they leave Dauntless and become factionless. In Insurgent, it is revealed that when Edward almost kills Drew and Molly who try to join the factionless division in which he and Myra are, she ends her relationship with Edward by saying that she can not handle his increasing violence.

Myra does not appear in the film, as the subplot concerning Edward, his expulsion from Dauntless, and subsequently joining the factionless is cut.

=== Bureau of Genetic Welfare ===
The Bureau of Genetic Welfare is an organization set up by the US Government to monitor the genetically damaged people living in the experiments. They have large compounds at the edges of major metropolitan areas, such as Chicago, Milwaukee and Indianapolis.

==== David ====
David
- The Divergent trilogy character
- First appearance: Allegiant
- Last appearance: Allegiant
- Created by: Veronica Roth
- Portrayed by: Jeff Daniels

In-universe information
- Gender: Male

David is the leader of the Bureau of Genetic Welfare's experiment in Chicago. It is his goal to cure the United States from genetic damage caused during the Purity War, a series of battles after an attempt to rid society of its main issues. He appears in the novel Allegiant serving as the main antagonist. David is the one who found the then 16-year-old Natalie, Tris' mother, after she had escaped from her home, and allowed her to become a test subject of the experiment. He is secretly in love with her, but she instead married Andrew Prior upon entering Chicago. Tris initially finds David to be a nice man after he lets her read Natalie's journal. Later Tris saves David's life during the attack by Nita. As the violence increases inside the city and the Allegiant start to prepare for the fight against the Factionless, David tries to save his experiment and decides to use the memory serum on the people in the city to erase their memories completely and start the experiments again. He later shoots and kills Tris when she breaks into his lab to use the memory serum on the people of the Bureau to stop further genetic experiments and discrimination. Exposed to the serum, David loses his memories and does not remember his role in the experiments; because of this, he is spared from being strangled by Four who is angered by Tris' death.

Jeff Daniels plays David in the film The Divergent Series: Allegiant, in which he appears as the main antagonist. Due to the abrupt cancellation of the film franchise, his ultimate fate in the films is unknown.

==== Matthew ====
Matthew
- The Divergent trilogy character
- First appearance: Allegiant
- Last appearance: Allegiant
- Created by: Veronica Roth
- Portrayed by: Bill Skarsgård

In-universe information
- Gender: Male

Matthew lives in the Bureau of Genetic Welfare compound at the site of O'Hare International Airport. He is a scientist who does research on serums and monitors the Chicago experiment. Despite being genetically pure, he is sympathetic with the GD (genetically damaged) because he was once in love with a GD girl, but he could not pursue a relationship with her due to their status before she died. Due to this, Matthew assists the GD rebels, led by Nita, in the compound as he sees the injustices they face. He formulates the plan to send Caleb to release the memory serum on the compound that ultimately results in Tris's death. In the epilogue, Matthew is revealed to be working as a psychiatrist of Chicago, in which he permanently resides. In We Can Be Mended, Matthew is dating Cara, telling Four that he is planning to propose to her soon.

Bill Skarsgård plays Matthew in the film The Divergent Series: Allegiant.

==== Nita ====
Nita
- The Divergent trilogy character
- First appearance: Allegiant
- Last appearance: Allegiant
- Created by: Veronica Roth
- Portrayed by: Nadia Hilker

In-universe information
- Gender: Female

Juanita "Nita" is a GD member of support staff in the Bureau's compound near Chicago. She was originally from Indianapolis and became a test subject of the Bureau before being promoted as a staff. She is resentful towards the genetically pure leaders of the compound and plans the rebellion in which Uriah is fatally injured. Nita convinces Four to assist the rebellion. Tris considers her to be attractive and is worried that she is attempting to attract Tobias's attention. Tris joins the effort until Matthew tells her that, contrary to Nita's promises that they are seeking the memory serum, Nita actually wants the death serum.

During the attack, Nita interrogates David in an attempt to learn the code. David is seriously injured but is saved from Nita's growing rage when Tris appears and threatens to kill David. Later, Nita is arrested and put in prison, though she still gives information to Tris about the room containing the memory serum with the promise that she would be freed. This is ultimately fulfilled after Tris successfully spreads the memory serum throughout the Bureau.

Nadia Hilker plays Nita in the film The Divergent Series: Allegiant.

==== George Wu ====
George Wu
- The Divergent trilogy character
- First appearance: Divergent (mentioned only)
- Last appearance: Allegiant
- Created by: Veronica Roth

In-universe information
- Gender: Male
- Family: Tori Wu (sister)
- Original faction: Erudite
- Faction: Dauntless

George Wu was born in Erudite and later chose Dauntless as his faction along with his sister Tori. However, when Dauntless and Erudite found out that he was a Divergent, he was apparently killed, with his body found at the bottom of the Chasm. His apparent death was officially ruled as suicide but his sister Tori does not believe that, knowing her brother was happy and also dating a fellow initiate. Believing that George was killed because his divergence was discovered, she plans to exact revenge against Erudite, in particular Jeanine Matthews, for having executed her brother.

He is mentioned several times in Divergent as Tori recounts the experiences about her brother, warning Tris that she will be executed if the government discovers that she is a Divergent. In Insurgent, Tori once again recounts her brother's apparent death as she corners Jeanine in her laboratory. She stabs Jeanine with a knife and demands her to speak George's name before she dies, which she does.

In Allegiant, Tris and her group find out after they have escaped Chicago that George is actually alive and well, having been living with the Bureau of Genetic Welfare since his apparent death. Tragically, he does not reunite with his sister, who also takes part in the escape group but is killed moments before the group reaches the border of the city. George helps Four and his group to infiltrate Chicago so he and Christina can inject the memory antiserum for their and Uriah's families. In the epilogue, Four mentions that George is working as a police tutor, although he himself does not physically appear nor join the zipline play in commemoration of the Choosing Day.

George does not appear in the film series.

==== Amar ====
Amar
- The Divergent trilogy character
- First appearance: The Transfer
- Last appearance: Allegiant
- Created by: Veronica Roth

In-universe information
- Gender: Male
- Faction: Dauntless

Amar is a former Dauntless instructor for initiates outside of Dauntless. He was Four's instructor during the latter's initiation and, as revealed in The Transfer, was the one who gave him his nickname, with which he was commonly known thereafter, due to his record-breaking number of four fears, the fewest of them all. Amar was later discovered to be a Divergent and apparently killed, with his body found near the railroad tracks. Four suspects that Amar's death was caused by Eric. In Allegiant, it is revealed that along with George Wu and fellow former instructor Zoe, Amar is still alive, having been rescued by the Bureau of Genetic Welfare outside of Chicago. He is reunited with his protégé, Four, who is part of a seven-man group fleeing the city. Together with Christina, Four, and Peter, Amar participates in the mission to save the Chicago population from having their memory wiped by David. The epilogue reveals that Amar utilizes his Dauntless ability to become a police officer.

Amar does not appear in the film series.

=== Other ===
==== Edith Prior ====
Edith Prior
- The Divergent trilogy character
- First appearance: Insurgent
- Last appearance: Insurgent
- Created by: Veronica Roth
- Portrayed by: Janet McTeer

In-universe information
- Gender: Female
- Family: Unnamed (brother); Andrew Prior (descendant); Caleb Prior (descendant); Beatrice "Tris" Prior (descendant)
- Faction: Abnegation

Edith Prior, born Amanda Marie Ritter, was a researcher and volunteer for the faction system who appears at the end of Insurgent in the video retrieved by Four and Caleb. Edith was from Peoria according to her journal. Tris suspects that Edith was a product of a broken home, like her mother. Edith entered Chicago as an Abnegation member, although her surname suggests that her relatives did mutual transfer with Erudite, as Tris' father, Andrew, who is a seventh-generational descendant of Edith's brother, was born in Erudite.

In the video, Edith explains that the world had become corrupt and for this reason factions are established in Chicago. After that, the city was sealed from the rest of the world. She further explains the importance of Divergents and says that once they increase in number, then Amity will have to open the gates of the city and the people in Chicago will re-enter the world. She changed her birth name, Amanda Ritter, once she entered the Abnegation faction in Chicago. After her video ends, the room erupts into voices.

Janet McTeer plays Edith Prior in the 2015 The Divergent Series: Insurgent, as well as 2016 The Divergent Series: Allegiant through archival footage.
