= Allegiant (novel) =

2013 dystopian young adult novel by Veronica Roth

- Cover of first edition
- Author: Veronica Roth
- Cover artist: Joel Tippie
- Language: English
- Series: Divergent trilogy
- Genre: Dystopia, romance, young adult fiction
- Publisher: HarperCollins and Katherine Tegen Books
- Publication date: October 22, 2013
- Publication place: United States
- Media type: Print (hardcover)
- Pages: 526 pp (first edition)
- ISBN: 0-06-202406-X
- OCLC: 855550266
- LC Class: PZ7.R7375 Al 2013
- Preceded by: Insurgent
- Followed by: We Can Be Mended

Allegiant is a dystopian novel for young adults, written by the American author Veronica Roth and published by HarperCollins in October 2013. It completes the Divergent trilogy that Roth started with her debut novel Divergent in 2011. The book is written from the perspective of both Beatrice (Tris) and Tobias (Four). Following the revelations of the previous novel, they journey past the city's boundaries to discover what lies beyond.

Allegiant was published simultaneously by Katherine Tegen Books and HarperCollins Children's Books in the UK. Four weeks earlier, a free electronic companion book to the trilogy titled The World of Divergent: The Path to Allegiant was released online. The novel was to be adapted into a two-part film, the first part, The Divergent Series: Allegiant, was released on March 18, 2016, while the second part, called Ascendant, was planned to release in June 2017 but was redeveloped as a TV movie before getting ultimately canceled.

== Plot ==
A future dystopian Chicago has a society that defines its citizens by strict conformity to their social and personality-related affiliations with five different factions. That removes the threat of anyone exercising independent will and threatening the population's safety again by war or another human-created catastrophe. Those who fail the initiation of their particular faction are deemed Factionless and are treated as a lower class and a drain on society.

After the revelation about their city, Evelyn Johnson-Eaton becomes Chicago's leader, which forces all factions to live equally with the Factionless. Confessing their role in the insurgency, Beatrice "Tris" Prior, Christina, and Cara are pardoned. Tris learns from Tobias "Four" Eaton about the rebel "Allegiant," who work to restore the faction system. Several people are killed in a confrontation between faction members and the Factionless, including Evelyn's right-hand man, Edward. Tris is invited to a meeting with the Allegiant whose leaders, Cara and Johanna Reyes, plan to usurp Evelyn and send envoys outside the city. Tris is selected for the expedition, alongside Tobias, Cara, Christina, Peter Hayes, Uriah Pedrad, and Tori Wu. Tris asks Tobias to free her brother Caleb from execution and to bring him along on the journey. Tori is killed by the Factionless whilst fleeing the city, and the others escape and meet Tobias's mentor, Amar, who has long been presumed dead. They are taken to the Bureau of Genetic Welfare (a part of the US government) and its leader, David.

David explains that Chicago is walled off from the outside world in an experiment sanctioned by the US government to produce genetically-purer (GP) "Divergents" from the genetically-damaged (GD) population, the result of a failed attempt to correct human genes that led to the "Purity War." David gives Tris her mother Natalie's journal that details her life before Chicago. She was a refugee from Milwaukee who joined the Bureau and became a volunteer to stop Erudite's killing of Divergents. Those rescued included Amar and Tori's brother, George. Tobias learns he is not a true Divergent and joins GD Bureau member Juannita "Nita" in a rebellion against the GP staff. Tris is skeptical of the plan but jealous of Nita. The GP informant Matthew helps Nita access the Weapon Room and set off a bomb that causes Uriah to be brain-damaged. Tris stops Nita's rampage by holding David hostage before she wounds and arrests her.

Tris is appointed a council member and realizes that the Bureau supplied Erudite with the simulation serums that controlled Dauntless in the invasion of Abnegation. Security footage reveals that Marcus Eaton, who was banished by Evelyn, is working with Johanna to steal weapons from the Factionless, which Evelyn will counter by releasing the death serum. Tris learns that David intends to release serums that can erase the population's memories to save his experiment. She formulates a plan to release the memory serum on the Bureau while Tobias, Christina, and Peter, with Amar and George's help, return to Chicago with antiserums for Christina and Uriah's families.

Tobias, with his own plan to inject his mother with a memory serum, confronts her and asks her to avert the war in exchange for becoming his mother again. Evelyn agrees, negotiates peace with Johanna and Marcus, and exiles herself for two years, and Marcus vows never to lead Chicago. Tobias gives the memory serum to Peter, who takes it, intending to start anew.

Caleb volunteers to expose the memory serum, a suicide mission, but Tris replaces him. She successfully repels the death serum but is shot by David. Dying, Tris sees visions of her mother embracing her, before she succumbs to her wounds. Tobias, Christina, and Peter return to the Bureau and learn from Cara of Tris's death. In a deep depression, Tobias is about to drink the memory serum to erase his memories of Tris until Christina stops him. Uriah's brother, Ezekiel "Zeke", and his mother, Hana, are with Uriah as his life support is unplugged.

Two-and-a-half years later, Chicago is reopened and being rebuilt, and people co-exist regardless of gene purity. Tobias, now an assistant council member under Johanna, welcomes Evelyn back from her exile. To celebrate Choosing Day, he, Christina, Caleb, Zeke, Shauna, Cara, and Matthew ride a zip line from the Hancock Building, where Tobias scatters Tris's ashes and finally accepts her sacrifice.

== Background ==
=== Development ===
On July 18, 2013 at the San Diego Comic-Con panel for the film Divergent, Roth revealed that Allegiant is told from the points of view of both Tris and Four. About that, she said, "I tried repeatedly to write Allegiant in just Tris's voice, but it didn't work; her perspective, her way of seeing things, was a little too limited for the story I needed to tell, I wanted to do two things with it: A. let two characters experience different things, and B. let them react differently to the same things, so that I (and eventually, the reader) would get a better sense of the whole story, the whole picture."

She further said, "I've said before that I've always seen Four (increasingly, as the series goes on) as a plot-mover alongside Tris, so he was the obvious choice for the second POV (though not the only one I tried). Exploring him and his choices and his assumptions about the world was incredibly interesting to me."

=== Title ===
Roth said that she did not try to choose titles ending with "-ent" for all three books. She also said, "I did not go through other ideas. It was always Allegiant," which she defined as "One who is loyal or faithful to a particular cause or person."

== The World of Divergent: The Path to Allegiant ==
The World of Divergent: The Path to Allegiant
- Cover
- Author: Veronica Roth
- Cover artist: Joel Tippie
- Series: Divergent trilogy
- Genre: Science fiction, dystopia, romance, young adult fiction,
- Publisher: Katherine Tegen Books
- Publication date: September 24, 2013
- Publication place: United States
- Media type: e-Book (Kindle)
- Pages: 50
- ISBN: 9780062300805

The World of Divergent: The Path to Allegiant is a promotional electronic book by Roth that was released free of charge by HarperCollins on September 24, 2013. Published four weeks before Allegiant was released, it was intended to be a companion book to the Divergent trilogy. Roth continues to write related fiction, and The Path to Allegiant is a companion book to the entire Divergent universe in many respects. It contains an exclusive detailed description of Factions and their origin, the inspirations for the trilogy, a quiz on "Factions," and answers by Roth regarding the trilogy. The book also contained ten teasers from Allegiant.

== Critical reception ==
In a review for Entertainment Weekly, Hillary Busis gave the novel B+ and wrote that "If you've already been sucked into Roth's world, you'll appreciate the book's twisty plot—which provides needed context for the series' prefabricated society—and its chastely torrid Tris/Tobias love scenes." Publishers Weekly said in its review that "The alternating perspectives are bothersome at times, due to the similarity between Tris and Tobias's first-person narratives. However, for those who have faithfully followed these five factions, and especially the Dauntless duo who stole hearts two books ago, this final installment will capture and hold attention until the divisive final battle has been waged."

== Film adaptations ==
On December 16, 2013, Summit Entertainment announced that the film adaptation of Allegiant would be released on March 18, 2016. On April 11, 2014, Lionsgate announced that the film adaptation would be split into two films titled The Divergent Series: Allegiant and The Divergent Series: Ascendant. On July 9, 2014, Lionsgate recruited Noah Oppenheim to write the screenplay for Part 1. Shailene Woodley, Theo James, and Naomi Watts will reprise their roles. On December 5, 2014, it was announced that Robert Schwentke, who directed The Divergent Series: Insurgent, would return to direct Allegiant. Principal photography for The Divergent Series: Allegiant began in Atlanta on May 18, 2015. The film was released to generally negative reviews from critics, and was a box office disappointment, grossing only $179 million worldwide against a $142 million budget.

Ascendant was to have had a release date of June 9, 2017. After the poor performance of Allegiant at the box office, it was announced it would be created as a television film, followed by a television spinoff series. However, in February 2017, after it was announced that the fourth film would be a television project, Woodley backed out of her starring role.

In December 2018, both the TV movie and series were canceled.
