= Insurgent (novel) =

2012 science fiction young adult novel by Veronica Roth

- Cover of first edition
- Author: Veronica Roth
- Cover artist: Joel Tippie
- Language: English
- Series: Divergent trilogy
- Genre: Dystopia, romance, young adult fiction
- Publisher: Katherine Tegen Books
- Publication date: May 1, 2012
- Publication place: United States
- Media type: Print (hardcover)
- Pages: 525 (first ed.); 568 pp (collector's ed.)
- ISBN: 0-06-202404-3 (first) ISBN 0-06-223493-5 (coll.)
- OCLC: 794210765
- LC Class: PZ7.R7375 Ins 2012; PZ7.R7375 Ins 2012b
- Preceded by: Divergent
- Followed by: Allegiant

Insurgent is a 2012 dystopian young adult novel by American novelist Veronica Roth and the second book in the Divergent trilogy. As the sequel to the 2011 bestseller Divergent, it continues the story of Tris Prior and the post-apocalyptic version of Chicago. Following the events of the previous novel, a war now looms as conflict between the factions and their ideologies grows. While trying to save the people that she loves, Tris faces questions of grief, forgiveness, identity, loyalty, politics, and love.

The book was first published on May 1, 2012, by the HarperCollins imprints Katherine Tegen Books in the U.S. and HarperCollins Children's Books in the UK, and a "Collector's Edition" was published on October 30 in the United States. Insurgent received mostly positive reviews from critics, with reviewers praising Roth's writing.

A film adaptation of the novel was released on March 20, 2015.

== Background ==
The background to the story, revealed in the first novel of the trilogy, explains how Chicago in the post-apocalyptic future is now a society that defines its citizens by strict conformity to their social and personality affiliations with five different factions. That removes the threat of anyone exercising independent will and threatening the population's safety again by war or some other human-created catastrophe. The factions are Abnegation for the selfless, Amity for the peaceful, Candor for the honest, Dauntless for the brave, and Erudite for the intelligent. Those who are tested with equal aptitude for more than one faction are deemed "Divergent". Their capability for independent thought beyond the restrictive nature of the factions causes Divergents to be considered threats to the society and to be hunted and killed by the ruthless leader of Erudite to eliminate the "threat" of independent thinking. Factions are meant to be a lifetime allegiance, far more important than family, and "faction before blood" is a societal motto. Those who fail the initiation of their particular faction or subsequently leave it are "Factionless", a permanently-homeless group of outcasts that is deemed to be a drain on society.

== Plot ==
After the events of Divergent, Beatrice "Tris" Prior, Tobias "Four" Eaton, Caleb Prior, Peter Hayes, and Marcus Eaton seek refuge in the Amity sector. Tris overhears Marcus and Amity leader Johanna Reyes discuss the fact that the Abnegation leaders died to protect secret information. Erudite and the Dauntless traitors arrive to arrest the Divergents, but Tris flees with Four, Caleb, and Susan Black on a train to the Factionless sector. There, they meet Tobias' mother, Evelyn Johnson-Eaton, who tries to persuade her son to sway Dauntless into joining forces with the Factionless against Erudite.

While Caleb and Susan return to Abnegation, Tris and Tobias head to Candor headquarters, where the other Dauntless now reside. Under truth serums, Tobias confides his reasons for transferring to Dauntless, and Tris reveals her killing of Will in self-defense, which strains her relationship with her friend Christina. That night, the Dauntless traitors, led by Eric, arrive and shoot simulation serums into their fellow Dauntless and knock everyone unconscious except the Divergents: Tris, Uriah Pedrad, and several others. As Eric has just shot an eleven year old Divergent, Tris stabs him, just before the Dauntless attack Eric's supporters.

Tris, Tobias, Lynn, and Shauna spy on the discussion arranged by the Candor leader Jack Kang with Jeanine Matthews's representative and Dauntless traitor, Max. Lynn shoots and kills Max, and Shauna is rendered paraplegic by a nerve serum. To prevent Jeanine from holding another prisoner exchange, the Dauntless vote to execute Eric, which Tobias does without hesitation. To avoid being dependent on Candor, the Dauntless return to their own headquarters and disable most of the security cameras inside. However, Tris is alerted by Christina that one camera has caused three Dauntless members (Marlene, Hector, and Kee) to become simulated into attempting suicide unless a Divergent is handed over. They are unable to save Marlene.

Tris surrenders to Erudite and is placed in a cell by Peter and, to her shock, Caleb, both of whom are working with Jeanine. Tobias follows and is captured but not before he convinces Dauntless to ally with the Factionless, with their insurgency arranged to occur over several days. After unsuccessful simulation tests, Jeanine orders Tris' execution, but Peter swaps the lethal dose with a paralytic and frees Tobias, and the three escape to Abnegation. Tris meets with Marcus, who tells her that Jeanine has withheld Abnegation's secret. If the Factionless learned of it, it would certainly be destroyed.

Tris, Christina, and Marcus head for Amity to request Johanna's help. She, alongside several others including Susan's brother, Robert, choose to assist them, despite Amity's resistance. They are joined by Cara and another Erudite renegade, Fernando, who act as navigators. The "Insurgents" infiltrate Erudite headquarters. Fernando is killed, but they manage to access Jeanine's laboratory. Inside, Tris faces down simulations before she confronts Jeanine, who is cornered by Tori Wu. Tori kills Jeanine and then brands Tris a traitor. The invasion of Erudite over, Tris learns of the casualties, including Lynn, and the fact that the Factionless have taken all weapons to rule in Jeanine's place. Tris is handcuffed, alongside Christina, Marcus, and the other Insurgents, but manages to pass the information to Tobias, which he and Caleb share through the computers. A secret video, narrated by Edith Prior, from "an organization fighting for peace," reveals that the world had become corrupt, and the city was sealed to allow the Divergents to increase, and Amity was then to open the fence forever and allow the population to re-enter the world. The room erupts into voices as the book ends.

== Setting ==
The setting is a dystopian Chicago in the far future in which Lake Michigan has turned into a giant marsh. The Candor compound surrounds a ruined Merchandise Mart, called the "Merciless Mart" because of their unrelenting honesty. The Amity live on farms outside a fence that surrounds the city and keeps the other factions in; their central meeting area is a building with a great tree in the center. The Dauntless compound is the combination of a glass building and a deep cave underneath it and is nicknamed "The Pit." The Abnegation sector is a cookie-cutter neighborhood in which "everything looks alike." The Erudite compound is in a futuristic part of the city, including the former site of Grant Park (a sculpture resembling the famous "Cloud Gate" is mentioned in Divergent), and the buildings are very advanced.

== Paperback editions ==
In the US, the book was released in the paperback format on January 20, 2015. The standard retail version includes previously unreleased material (deleted scenes). There are also several retailer exclusive versions at Barnes & Noble, Books-A-Million, Target, and Walmart, each with different deleted scenes and questions and answers with the authors.

== Critical reception ==
Insurgent received mostly-positive reviews from critics. The trade publication Publishers Weekly received the novel enthusiastically: "Roth knows how to write. So even though this second book of the trilogy that began with Divergent feels like a necessary bridge between the haunting story she created in book one and the hinted-at chaos of book three, readers will be quick to forgive.... The author has a subtle way of pulling readers into a scene ('The outside air.... smells green, the way a leaf does when you tear it in half'), and the novel's love story, intricate plot, and unforgettable setting work in concert to deliver a novel that will rivet fans of the first book." Kirkus Reviews said, "The unrelenting suspense piles pursuit upon betrayal upon torture upon pitched battles; the violence is graphic, grisly and shockingly indiscriminate. The climactic reveal, hinting at the secret origins of their society, is neither surprising nor particularly plausible, but the frenzied response makes for another spectacular cliffhanger." Roth has admitted a number of continuity errors in Insurgent, an aftereffect of overlapping novel drafts.

=== Awards and nominations ===
Insurgent won Favorite Young Adult Fantasy & Science Fiction and Author of 2012 in the Goodreads Choice Awards. It was also nominated at Children's Choice Book Awards for Teen book of the year and Author of the year.

== Film adaptation ==
Summit Entertainment announced that a film adaptation of Insurgent would be released as The Divergent Series: Insurgent on March 20, 2015, as a sequel to the film adaptation of Divergent, with Brian Duffield originally chosen to write the script for the film. On December 16, 2013, it was announced that Neil Burger, the director of Divergent, would not return to direct Insurgent because he was still working on the first film. On February 13, 2014, it was announced that Robert Schwentke was offered the director position for the film and that Akiva Goldsman had been hired to rewrite Duffield's script. The Divergent Series: Insurgent began filming in Atlanta on May 27, 2014, and concluded on September 6, 2014.
