= Free Four: Tobias Tells the Divergent Knife-Throwing Scene =

2012 short story by Veronica Roth

- Cover
- Author: Veronica Roth
- Language: English
- Series: Divergent trilogy
- Genre: Science fiction, Young adult, dystopian, Romance
- Publisher: Katherine Tegen Books/HarperCollins
- Publication date: April 23, 2012
- Publication place: United States
- Media type: e-book
- Pages: 13
- ISBN: 9780062237422

"Free Four: Tobias Tells the Divergent Knife-Throwing Scene" is a short story, written by author Veronica Roth. The work retells the events of chapter thirteen of Divergent, but is written from the perspective of Tobias "Four" Eaton instead of Beatrice "Tris" Prior. It was released on April 23, 2012.

== Background ==
Roth wrote this short story to change the perception about Divergent story. Talking about why she chose Chapter 13 of the book, she said on her blog:

"It was hard for me to pick just the right one. I thought about the Ferris wheel scene, and I thought about the fear landscape scene, and both of those would have been good options. But I really wanted to choose something that would change our (I say "our" because it changed mine, too) perceptions about the story, and show how limited Tris's perspective really is, though she is a reliable and observant narrator. And the knife-throwing scene was perfect for that--once I started writing, I discovered all kinds of things about Four that I didn't know, and I knew this scene was The One."

== Reception ==
The short story received positive response. The book stop in its review said that "I thought that this book showed how limited Tris’ perspective actually is. It made me think about the whole Divergent series and what it would be like from other characters perspectives. It definitely changed my opinion about different events in the series, in a good way."
