= Divergent (novel series) =

Dystopian novel series by Veronica Roth

- Boxed set
- (in publication order); Divergent (2011); Insurgent (2012); Allegiant (2013); Four: A Divergent Collection (2014); We Can Be Mended: A Divergent Series Epilogue (2018)
- Author: Veronica Roth
- Country: United States
- Language: English
- Genre: Adventure; Science fiction Dystopian; Young adult fiction
- Publisher: Katherine Tegen Books
- Published: 2011–2013
- Media type: Print (hardcover and paperback)

Divergent, also known as The Divergent Series, is a series of young adult dystopian novels by American novelist Veronica Roth set in a post-apocalyptic dystopian Chicago. The trilogy consists of Divergent (2011), Insurgent (2012), and Allegiant (2013). A related book, Four (2014), presents a series of short stories told from the perspective of one of the trilogy's characters, the male love interest Tobias. A later short story, We Can Be Mended (2018), serves as an epilogue five years after the events of the trilogy, again from Tobias/Four's perspective.

The trilogy is set in the future in a dystopian society that is divided into five factions. The trilogy's society defines its members by their social and personality affiliations, with the five different factions removing the threat of anyone exercising independent will and threatening the population's safety. Beatrice Prior, who later changes her name to Tris, is born into Abnegation but transfers into Dauntless; she must figure out her secret life as a Divergent – those whose true nature includes aspects of all five factions – in danger of being killed if her true nature is discovered by the leaders of the Erudite and Dauntless factions.

== List of novels ==
#	Title	Pages	Chapters	Words	Audio	US release
1	Divergent	487	39	105,143	11h 12m	April 26, 2011
2	Insurgent	525	47	98,890	11h 24m	May 11, 2012
3	Allegiant	526	50	110,354	11h 52m	October 22, 2013
4	Four: A Divergent Collection	304	82	59,727	6h 33m	July 8, 2014
5	We Can Be Mended	29	1	6,000		January 9, 2018
	Total	1871	219	380,114	41h 1m	

=== Divergent ===
The first main installment in the series tells the story of Beatrice Prior, a teenager who lives in a post-apocalyptic Chicago in which society has been divided into five factions, each with a specialized social function: Abnegation (selflessness), Dauntless (bravery), Erudite (intelligence), Amity (peace), and Candor (honesty). Beatrice, a member of Abnegation, has her test results reveal she is Divergent—possessing traits of multiple factions—she is warned to keep it a secret, as Divergents are considered dangerous. She transfers to Dauntless at the age of 16, takes the new name Tris in the process, and forms a romantic relationship with Abnegation-born Tobias Eaton. Tris also faces brutal training, life-threatening challenges, and an unraveling conspiracy led by Erudite to overthrow the government. As war brews, Tris must decide where her loyalty lies while grappling with love, loss, and identity. In a society that demands conformity, Tris learns that being different may be the only way to survive—and fight back against a system built on control and fear.

=== Insurgent ===
The second main installment in the series is set immediately after the events of Divergent.

Tris, Tobias, and their allies begin rallying the favor of other factions and the Factionless, those who do not fit with the faction system, against the tyranny of the Erudite leader Jeanine Matthews, in order to save the Divergent. They struggle through hard times under the tyranny of Jeanine and the wants of Evelyn. Eventually, after winning, Evelyn takes over and the story continues in Allegiant.

=== Allegiant ===
The third and final main installment in the series takes place after the ending of Insurgent. Tris, Tobias, and their allies escape from a Chicago that is now dominated by the Factionless towards the fringes. They learn the real nature of Chicago's faction system and must then find a way to prevent a civil war from wreaking havoc on their hometown.

=== Four: A Divergent Collection ===
The anthology consists of five short stories previously released separately as e-books, in addition to three new ones. The book focuses on Tobias Eaton and is both a prequel and a retelling of certain events of the first book, Divergent.

=== We Can Be Mended: A Divergent Series Epilogue ===
The short story serves as an epilogue to the series. Taking place five years after the main trilogy, it focuses on Tobias and Christina as they slowly form a romantic relationship as a way to fill the void left behind by their dead lovers: Tris and Will.

This story was initially released as a bonus ebook available with pre-orders and day-of-publication purchases of Roth's 2017 novel, Carve the Mark. Its English language edition is still only available as an ebook.

=== The Sixth Faction: A Divergent AU (Alternate Universe) ===
The Sixth Faction is a young adult dystopian novel by Veronica Roth and the first book in a duology set in the Divergent universe. Announced at BookCon 2026, the novel presents an alternate-universe storyline in which protagonist Beatrice “Tris” Prior chooses a different faction during her Choosing Ceremony, leading to major changes in her fate. The story explores identity, choice, and societal structure within a reimagined narrative. The book released on October 6, 2026, with a sequel expected in 2027.

== Critical reception ==
The trilogy received positive reviews from critics. Critics praised Divergent for its plot and action, and Insurgent was praised for its writing and pace. Another critic said, "No one can argue that Divergent is not a fun, edge-of-your-seat read. It is easy to get submerged in, effortless to remain engaged in, and impossible not to enjoy even the slightest bit." Allegiant was praised for being "gripping" and for the love story, but was criticized for its ending and prose.

== Film adaptations ==
Summit Entertainment had bought the rights to film an adaptation of the novel and recruited Neil Burger to direct, with Shailene Woodley starring as Beatrice "Tris" Prior and Theo James as Tobias "Four" Eaton. Lionsgate and its subsidiary Summit Entertainment distributed the film. Kate Winslet was signed as Jeanine Matthews. Also recruited into the cast were Maggie Q as Tori, Zoe Kravitz as Christina, Ansel Elgort as Caleb, Miles Teller as Peter, Ashley Judd as Natalie Prior, Tony Goldwyn as Andrew Prior, and Jai Courtney as Eric. Divergent was released on March 21, 2014. Insurgent began filming in Atlanta on May 27, 2014 and was released on March 20, 2015. The adaptation of Allegiant was split into two parts; the first part, Allegiant, was released on March 18, 2016, while the second part, titled Ascendant, was originally planned to be released in June 2017. The big screen release of Ascendant was shelved due to the poor box office results of Allegiant. On July 20, 2016, it was announced that Ascendant would be released as a TV movie, but later scrapped.

== See also ==
- The Giver
