= Divergent (novel) =

2011 novel by Veronica Roth

- Cover of the first edition
- Author: Veronica Roth
- Cover artist: Joel Tippie (Note: According to ISFDB a 2011 Australian printing, with apparently identical cover, credits the jacket art and design to Joel Tippie. But it credits other components, too, and "the cover seems to be a happy new year collage of multiple images including the not-seemingly-credited skyline.")
- Language: English
- Series: Divergenttrilogy
- Genre: Dystopia, young adult fiction
- Publisher: Katherine Tegen Books
- Publication date: April 26, 2011
- Publication place: United States
- Media type: Print (hardcover), e-book, paperback
- Pages: 487 (first edition)
- ISBN: 0-06-202402-7
- OCLC: 769412945
- LC Class: PZ7.R7375 Di 2011
- Followed by: Insurgent

Divergent is the debut novel of American novelist Veronica Roth, published by HarperCollins Children's Books in 2011. The first in the Divergent series, a trilogy of young adult dystopian novels (plus a book of short stories), the novel is set in a post-apocalyptic Chicago, where society defines its citizens by their social and personality-related affiliation with one of five factions. This rigid system has removed the threat of anyone exercising independent will and re-threatening the population's safety. In the story, Beatrice Prior joins the ranks of the Dauntless faction and explores her new identity as "Tris". Underlying the action- and dystopian-focused main plot is a romantic subplot between Tris and "Four", one of her instructors in the Dauntless faction.

The novel has been compared to other dystopian young adult books of the 21st century such as The Hunger Games (2008) and The Maze Runner (2009) because of its similar themes and target audience. In particular, the novel explores themes common to young adult fiction such as adult authority and the transition from childhood to maturity. Motifs considered within the post-apocalyptic society include the place of violence and social structure. Its major plot device, the division of society into personality types, is one used in other science fiction works. Beyond its literary context, Roth's open declaration of her religion as a Christian has brought commentary from Christian communities both endorsing and challenging the novel.

Roth wrote Divergent while working on a creative writing degree at Northwestern University, and it was quickly purchased for publication alongside the subsequent books in the trilogy (published 2012 and 2013). Summit Entertainment purchased the media rights to the book in 2011 and subsequently produced a film adaptation, released March 21, 2014. The film generated nearly $290 million at the box office on a $88 million budget, but received mixed reviews from critics.

== Background and setting ==
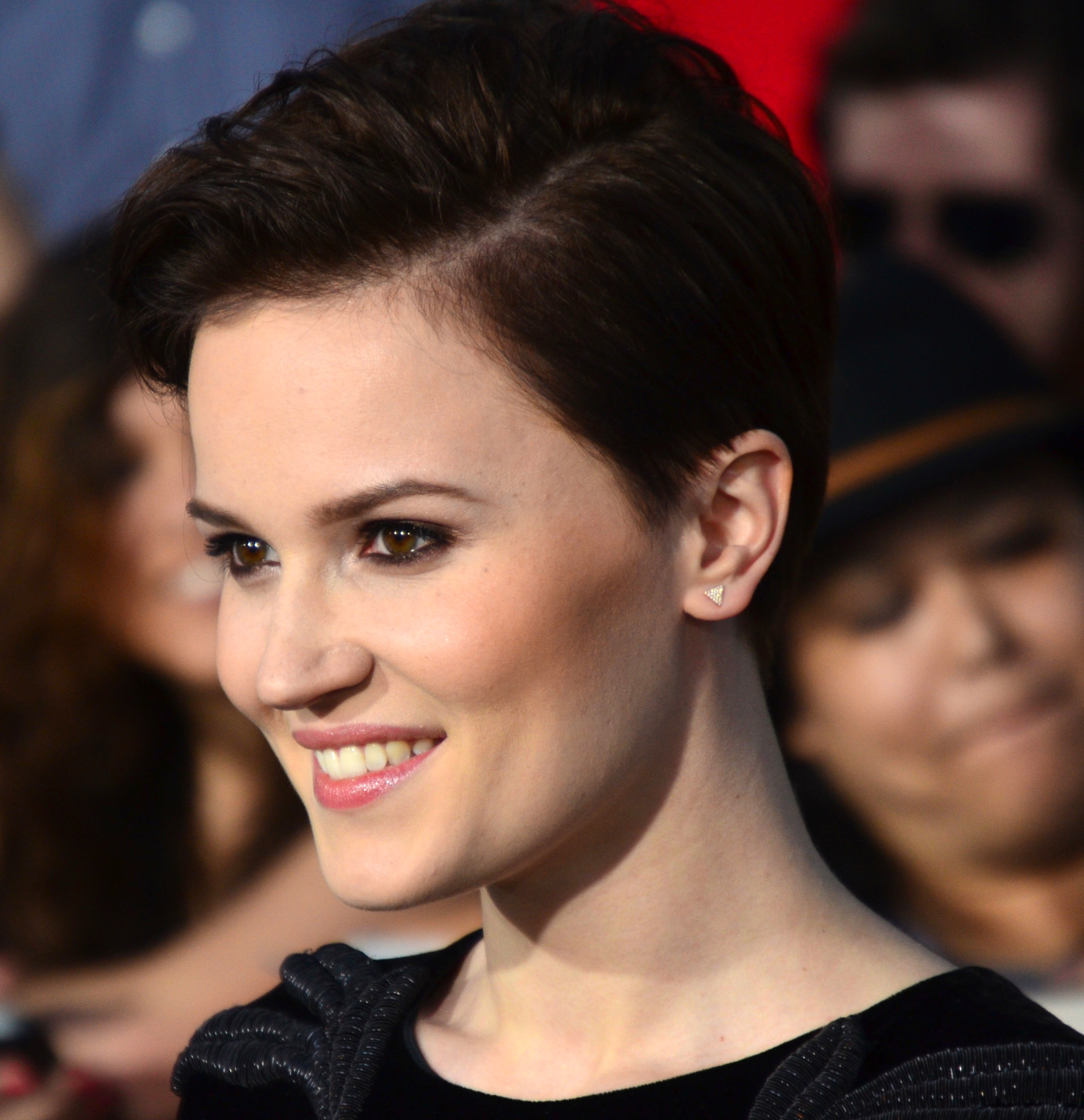
Roth (pictured) wrote the first draft of Divergent while she was on winter break from Northwestern University.

The novel is Roth's debut novel and was published a little over a year after Roth graduated with a bachelor's degree from the Creative Writing program at Northwestern University. Roth wrote the novel during her senior year winter break and sold movie rights to the novel before she had graduated. She had been working on the series from Four's point of view but decided that he was not the character she wanted for her series. Years later, she decided to pick up the novel from a different point of view. Roth wrote the series from Beatrice's point of view.

The novel is set in a post-apocalyptic Chicago. Roth indicated that she did not originally intend to use Chicago as the setting:

I wrote the rough draft and I felt like it needed a more grounded sense of place, and I looked at the city I had described, which is all these trains constantly moving, and this lake marsh, and these rivers. And I realized that it was Chicago already, and it was just because that's the city I've known and loved the longest.

== Plot ==
In a post-apocalyptic Chicago, people are divided into five factions: Abnegation, for people who are selfless; Amity, for those who are peaceful; Candor, for the honest; Dauntless, for the brave; and Erudite, for knowledge-seekers. All sixteen-year-olds are tested to determine which faction suits them best, but most end up selecting their own faction at the annual Choosing Ceremony. Those who do not pass their chosen faction's initiation become "Factionless" and live as outcasts, doing menial tasks.

Sixteen-year-old Beatrice Prior, a member of Abnegation, takes the standard test to help determine her best choice. Her inconclusive test results—Abnegation, Dauntless, and Erudite—mark her as "Divergent," and the test administrator, Tori, warns her never to tell anyone. Agonizing over her future, Beatrice leaves Abnegation, her original faction, and joins Dauntless. Her brother, Caleb, chooses Erudite, much to her and their parents' shock.

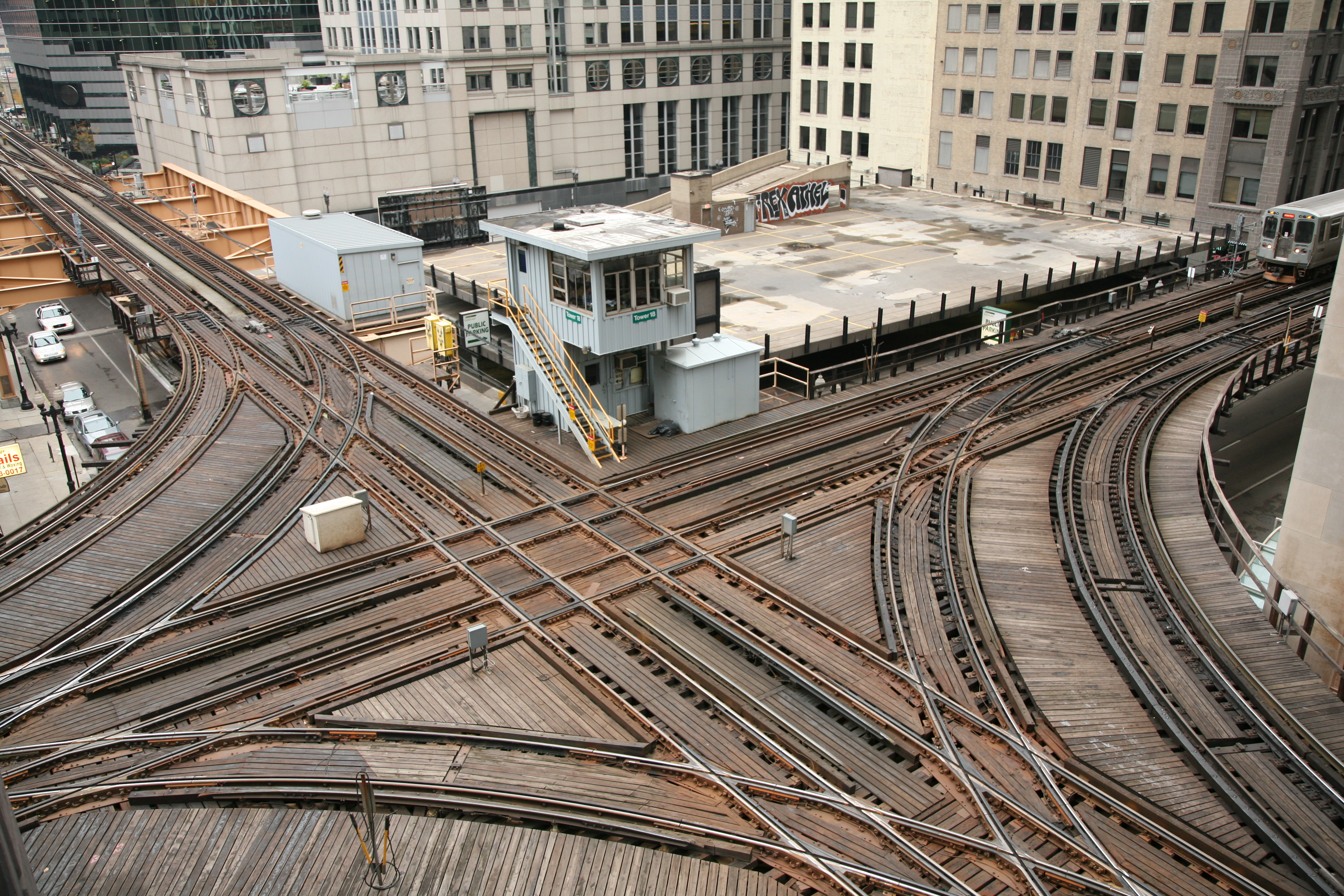
A junction on the Chicago "L", one of modern Chicago's train systems. The Dauntless demonstrate their fearlessness by jumping on and off moving trains throughout the novel.

The new Dauntless initiates jump onto a moving train to Dauntless headquarters and are instructed to jump off onto its roof. One initiate falls to her death, while another is too afraid to jump. Beatrice goes first when they are later ordered to jump off the roof into a dark hole. At the bottom is a net. She tells the instructor, Four, that her name is Tris. When eating later that evening, Four joins them. Tris is the only one brave enough to actually talk to him.

Four explains that only the top ten Dauntless initiates will stay; the rest will become Factionless. Tris befriends fellow initiates Christina, Will, and Al, but comes into conflict with others like Peter, Drew, and Molly.

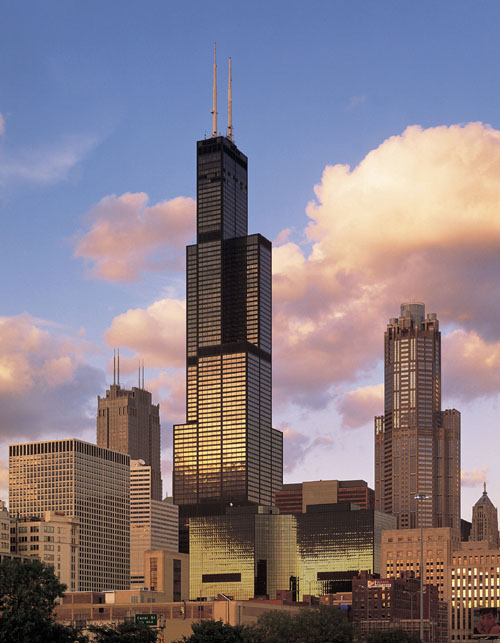
The Willis (or Sears) Tower, one of several landmarks Roth describes within post-apocalyptic Chicago, the novel's setting.

In the first initiation stage, they are trained in guns, knives, and hand-to-hand combat. Despite her lack of physical strength, Tris finishes in sixth place. A relationship develops between Tris and Four, while Peter pummels Tris in a fight. After the first-stage rankings are announced, the second-place Peter is suspected of stabbing the first-place Edward in the eye. Edward leaves to become Factionless, followed by his girlfriend Myra, and Peter takes his place at the top.

On Visiting Day, Tris' mother, Natalie, tells Tris to stay strong but not to bring too much attention to herself during training. Tris is suspicious of Natalie's knowledge of Dauntless initiation and reasons that she was a transfer from Dauntless into Abnegation.

Erudite stirs up dissent against Abnegation, which because of its selflessness holds most of the government positions, and accuses its leader, Marcus, of abusing his son. The rumors are fueled by the fact that Marcus's son, Tris, and Caleb all left Abnegation, which is also alleged to be hoarding supplies.

In the second stage, the initiates face their deepest fears in induced hallucinations. Tris's Divergent abilities give her an advantage and earn her the top rank. Peter, Molly, Al, and Drew attack her and nearly succeed in throwing her to her death, but Four intervenes. Al later begs Tris for forgiveness, but she rejects him. He is also near the bottom of the ranking, and dies hours later by suicide.

The final stage gathers the initiates' fears into a simulated "fear landscape" to test their acquired skills. Tris and Four grow closer, and he shows her his fear landscape. She discovers that he has only four fears, hence his nickname. In Four's final fear, Tris learns his real name, Tobias. She also finds out that Tobias's father, Marcus, was very abusive, proving claims about Marcus's neglect. Tobias uncover an Erudite plan to use Dauntless to stage an attack on Abnegation.

Tris overcomes her fear landscape, and is later ranked first at the initiation ceremony. She shares her feelings for Four. Nearly all of the Dauntless, including initiates but excluding complicit Dauntless, are injected with what Tris is told is a "tracking" serum. All of the Dauntless, get into lines, and allow Dauntless leaders to inject them with the "tracking" serum.

Tris soon wakes up to discover that all her friends are in a sleepwalking-like state where they move in unison, caused by the serum. She is the only one in her group that is not under the effect of it. Tris realizes the plan to attack Abnegation with Dauntless troops is underway. Tris and Tobias's Divergence leave them unaffected, and they escape to the Abnegation compound. Tris is shot, and they are captured. Jeanine Matthews, the Erudite leader and the attack's mastermind, injects Tobias with an experimental serum that overrides his Divergence, causing him to see his enemies as friends and vice versa. She then sends Four to oversee the attack from the Dauntless control room. Tris is almost drowned in a tank but is rescued by her mother, who reveals that she is also Divergent while helping Tris escape. Natalie sacrifices herself to let Tris reach the location where her father and brother are. Tris is then forced to kill her friend Will in an act of self-defense.

She finds her own father along with Tobias's father and explains the truth behind the attack. They fight their way to Dauntless headquarters, where Tris's father sacrifices himself to divert their pursuers. Tris is distraught but pushes on. The mind-controlled Four attacks Tris. Unwilling to kill him, Tris surrenders, which enables Four to break free of the serum's control. They shut down the Erudite controlling computer program and free the Dauntless. They board a train to the Amity sector to find the rest of the Abnegation survivors, who were headed to the Amity compound.

== Style ==
Many reviewers stated that the novel's writing style offers a distinctive, terse prose that creates a fast-paced reading experience. Susan Dominus, writing in The New York Times, described the style as "brisk pacing, lavish flights of imagination and writing that occasionally startles with fine detail." Abby Nolan, from The American Prospect, noted that Divergent follows the structural and stylistic patterns of The Hunger Games and Blood Red Road.

== Themes ==
=== Identity ===
As in other children's and young adult fiction, the novel probes placement of authority and identity within the youths' relationship to parents and other social forces. The critic Antero Garcia describes the thematic similarity between the dystopian novels as an interest in the "grasp of power between youth and adult authority" and compared the novel to Unwind by Neal Shusterman. In The New York Times, Susan Dominus stated that Divergent "explores a more common adolescent anxiety--the painful realization that coming into one's own sometimes means leaving family behind ideologically and physically." The Voice of Youth Advocates agreed and wrote that Divergent shows the pressure of "having to choose between following in your parents' footsteps or doing something new." The critic Antero Garcia compared the thematic interest in the characters being "forced into limiting constraints of identity and labor associated with their identity" to similar interest in forced identities and labor in the dystopian children's novels Matched by Allyson Braithwaite Condie and The Maze Runner by James Dashner.

=== Social structure and knowledge ===
The government division of a population into fragmented communities is a frequent device in young adult and children's fiction. YA novels such as Lois Lowry's The Giver, Monica Hughes’s The Dream Catcher, and Zilpha Snyder’s Green Sky Trilogy use that device to different ends. In her masters' thesis, Ashley Ann Haynes describes fractioning of societies in Divergent as a supporting comparison with Hunger Games. Unlike the latter, however, all can choose which faction to join if they follow the rules and pass the tests. According to Haynes, Divergent adds a new layer of complexity with its creation of an illusion of democracy for participants in its fractioned society, with the factions controlled by outside forces.

The basis of the social structure in Divergent is that each faction fulfils a role in society. Those who cannot contribute to society are cast aside to become "factionless" and are deprived of access to an identity and resources. In a journal article, Andrea Burgos-Mascarell compared the factionless to illegal immigrants, who do not have access to certain public services either. Both are marginalised from society because they are unable to contribute to it.

Some reviews criticized the lack of depth and realism of the social structures in the novel. Kirkus Reviews called the social structure a "preposterous premise." Booklist called the structure a "simplistic, color-coded world [that] stretches credibility on occasion." In a review for the University of Wisconsin-Whitewater's student newspaper Royal Purple News, Abrielle Backhaus notes how the "entire system seems insubstantial" and asks rhetorically, "How could it be possible for any individual, with his or her infinite emotions and experiences, to be condensed to one single quality to tolerate for the rest of their lives and to choose at the mere age of 16?" In an interview, Roth described the social structure to have expanded from her initial conception, and she added Candor to fill "a gap in the reasoning behind the world that needed to be filled."

The social structure most affects the novel's themes by socially dividing different knowledge types that characters can access. In her book chapter exploring how literacy in different knowledge types affects the series, Alice Curry described the factions and the character indoctrination in those factions as deliberately creating knowledge gaps between initiates to different factions. Because of the initiation process, the characters become illiterate in the knowledge that is valued by the other factions. Tris's "divergence" allows her to be successful because she can become literate in a broad set of knowledges and information types and so she becomes more admirable to the reader. Curry argues that Jeanine's leadership in Erudite represents an academic ivory tower that alienates other types of knowledge and so the book critiques academic learning in favor of the broader knowledge that is embodied by Tris. Curry compares the novel to Julie Bertagna's 2002 Exodus, describing both as using spaces and landscapes in which knowledge is learned, to critique "crumbling knowledge institutions," like academic spaces that "dissemble" knowledge instead of facilitating deeper holistic knowledge literacies that create "understanding."

=== Violence and fear ===
Like The Hunger Games, Divergent depicts considerable violence for a young adult novel. The Publishers Weekly review emphasized that stylistic choice, called it "edgy," and described the initiation rituals that Tris endures "as spellbinding as they are violent [requiring] sadistic tests of strength and courage." However, as Susan Dominus pointed out, the novel does not keep the violence at the forefront of reader experience. She wrote in The New York Times, "Terrible things happen to the people Tris loves, yet the characters absorb these events with disquieting ease. Here, somehow, the novel's flights from reality distance the reader from the emotional impact that might come in a more affecting realistic (or even fantasy) novel."

When describing her inspiration for the Dauntless training their initiates by exposing them to their fears, Roth, in an interview for the website "PopSugar," said that she was influenced by many sources, but the most important was her "Psych 101 my first year of college [where] I learned about exposure therapy, which is when they treat people with fear, like for anxiety. It exposes them repeatedly to what they're afraid of, and gradually you become less afraid of it, or have a healthy level of fear, and I thought of the Dauntless then, because they're conditioning perfectly normal people to get over perfectly rational fears."

Daniel Kraus's Booklist review of the novel described the intense psychological pressure as "akin to joining the marines" but also providing the "built-in tension" that makes the novel a compelling read.

=== Christianity ===
Though the novel does not maintain an overtly-Christian thematic interest, some readers place the novel's themes within that context because of Roth's professed religiosity. In the postscript "Acknowledgements," Roth emphasized her Christian faith: "Thank you, God, for your Son and for blessing me beyond comprehension." For some reviewers, this element of Roth's lifestyle is important to the novel's impact. For example, when reviewing the novel for the Christian ministry "Break Point," Sherry Early described Roth as "a Christian" and the novel setting as "post-feminist, maybe even Christian." She also said that though the novel is "not overtly Christian," it follows a "Christian point of view" because it "fight[s] against the restrictions placed upon her by a controlling and totalitarian state" and because "Tris must also explore the cracks and imperfections within her own psyche." K. B. Hoyle also acknowledges that the novel would have a "Christian message" in reviewing it for the Evangelical book review organization The Gospel Coalition. However, Hoyle criticized the novel for using profane terminology and for never "clarify[ing] what the practices are supposed to mean."

Reviewers outside the Christian community have also noticed the Christian context of the novel. In a review of the book and the first movie, David Edelstein observed the book's treatment of intellectuals as following a tendency in Christian culture to question genetic modification and the majority: the intellectual Erudite faction are largely depicted as control-hungry villains pitted against the Abnegation faction, which is depicted as righteous and merciful. He wrote, "The novelist, Veronica Roth, reserves her loathing for the 'Erudites', who spend their days in intellectual pursuit" and that the trend of intellectualism (thinking without feeling) "makes people apt to seize power and impose Maoist-like uniformity on entire populations — on pain of death."

== Reception ==
Divergent has received mostly positive reviews. In a review in The New York Times, Susan Dominus wrote that it was "rich in plot and imaginative details" but also that compared to other such books in the same genre as the Hunger Games trilogy, it did "not exactly distinguish itself." In a review for Entertainment Weekly, Breia Brissey said that it was "flimsier and less nuanced" than The Hunger Games but was good and gave it a B+ rating. Similarly, critiquing the "simplistic, color-coded world," Booklist reviewer Daniel Kraus still positively concluded that the novel was full of "gutsy action and romance" and called it a "spin on Brave New World." Kirkus said that it was "built with careful details and intriguing scope." Common Sense Media commented on the book's "deep messages about identity and controlling societies" and on the "unstoppable plot that's remarkably original." It was rated 5 out of 5 stars and given an age 13+ rating.

The book debuted at number six on The New York Times Children's Chapter Books Best Seller list on May 22, 2011, and remained on the list for 11 weeks. It also spent 39 weeks on the Children's Paperback list in 2012, reaching number one. The Times changed its Children's Best Seller lists in December 2012, eliminating the Children's Paperback list and recognizing "middle grade" and "young adult" books separately; Divergent continued its run on the new Young Adult Best Seller list. The novel stayed on the list for 47 weeks until November 3, 2013. According to Publishers Weekly, the combined three volumes of the Divergent series sold over 6.7 million copies in 2013 (three million hardcovers, 1.7 million paperbacks, and just under two million e-books). In the lead-up to the release of the film adaptation, Roth's novel topped USA Today's Best-Selling Books list in January 2014.

Divergent won Favorite book of 2011 in the Goodreads Readers Choice Awards, and won the senior category of the 2014 Young Reader's Choice Award. It was also number one in the Teens' Top Ten Vote, sponsored by YALSA.

== Film adaptation ==
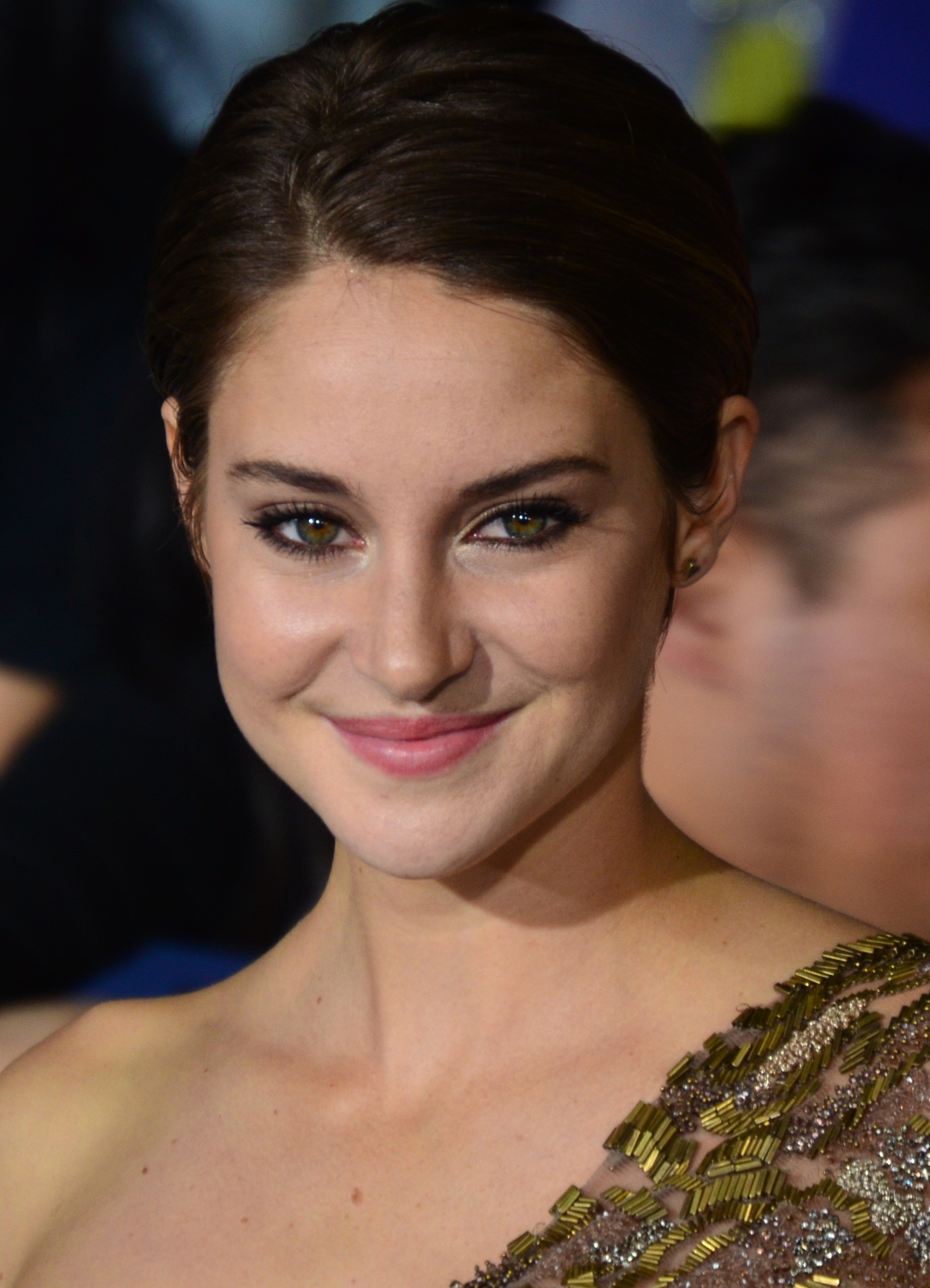
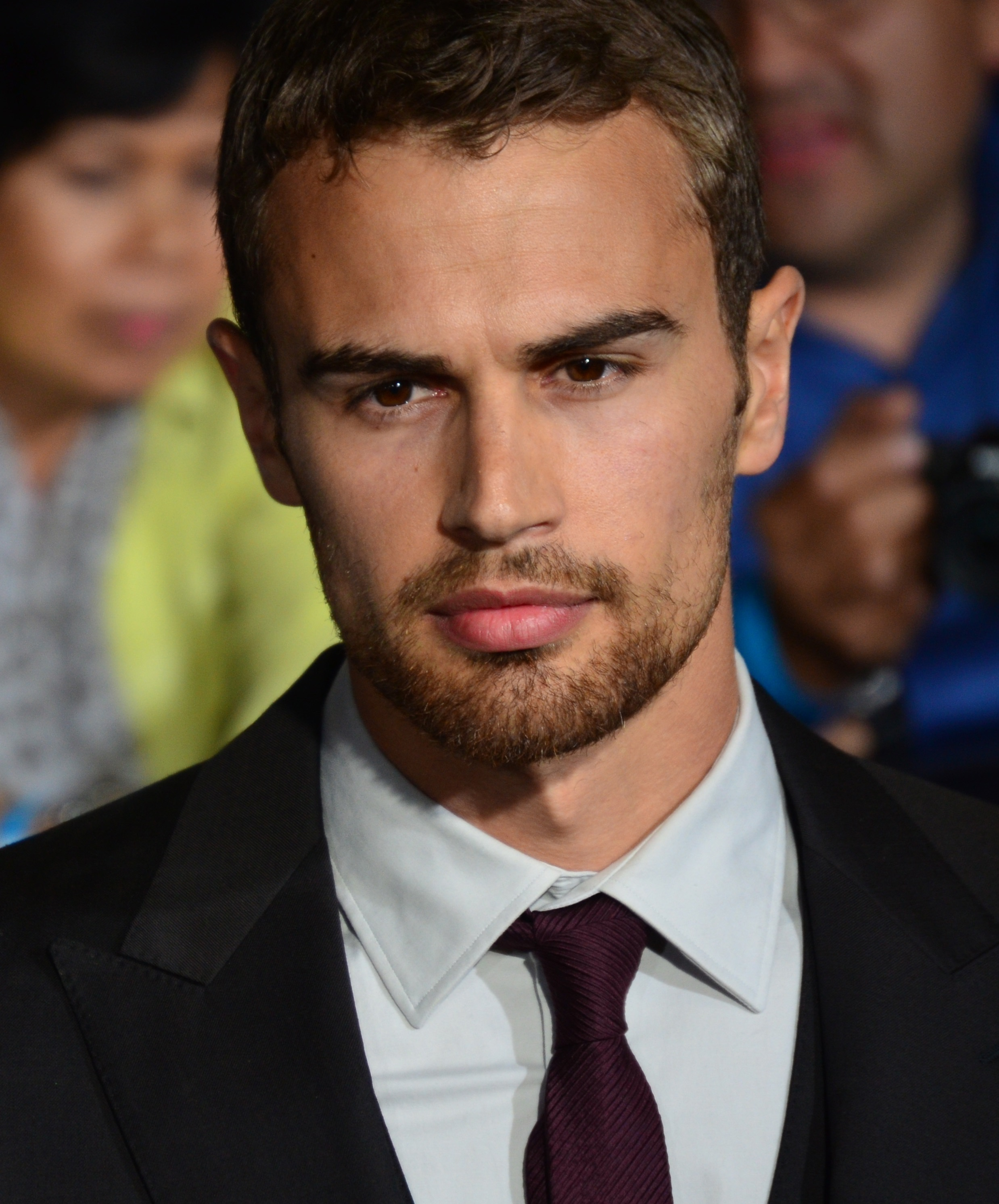
Shailene Woodley (left) and Theo James (right) play Tris and Four respectively in the film adaptation of the novel.

Summit Entertainment bought the rights to film an adaptation of the novel in 2011. Summit recruited Neil Burger to direct. Initially, Summit gave the film a budget of $40 million, but Lionsgate later increased it to $80 million, which was finally changed to $85 million because of the success of The Hunger Games.

Shailene Woodley was chosen to star as Beatrice "Tris" Prior. The role of Tobias "Four" Eaton eventually went to Theo James after an extensive search. Kate Winslet was signed as Jeanine Matthews. Also recruited into the cast were Maggie Q as Tori, Zoe Kravitz as Christina, Ansel Elgort as Caleb, Miles Teller as Peter, Ashley Judd as Natalie Prior, Tony Goldwyn as Andrew Prior, and Jai Courtney as Eric.

Filming began in Chicago on April 16, 2013, and concluded on July 16, with nearly all filming taking place in Chicago. The film was released March 21, 2014 and earned $150,947,895 in North America and $137,228,004 in other areas, for a worldwide total of $288,175,899. The critic aggregating sites Rotten Tomatoes and Metacritic both gave the films mixed reviews. However, the audience surveyor CinemaScore showed that audiences were very receptive to the film.
