= Vim and Vigor =

Vim and vigor is an irreversible binomial phrase, which includes the archaism / fossil word vim.

Vim and Vigor may refer to:

== Music ==
- Vim and Vigor, a 2014 album by Navarone (band)
- Vim and Vigor, a 2016 composition by Tom Brier
- "Vim and Vigor", in Music of Kingdom Hearts §§ Kingdom Hearts II Original Soundtrack and Kingdom Hearts Original Soundtrack Complete

== Other uses ==
- Vim and Vigor (Roth short story), in 2019 book The End and Other Beginnings by Veronica Roth
- Vim and Vigor, a competition category in the pageant in Smile (musical)

== See also ==
- Vim (disambiguation)
- Vigor (disambiguation)
- Full of Vim and Vigor (Chinese: 生龍活虎), a 1937 Chinese film directed by Xu Xinfu
- A Dame Full of Vim and Vigor: A Biography of Alice Middleton Boring, Biologist in China, a 1999 book by Marilyn Bailey Ogilvie
- Fifteen Songs of Vim and Vigor, a 1991 album by Tree Fort Angst
- The Vim and Vigour of Alvarius B and Cerberus Shoal, a 2003 music release by Cerberus Shoal and Alvarius B
