= The Voice of Holland season 10 =

Dutch reality singing competition

The Voice of Holland
- Season 10
- Hosted by: Martijn Krabbé; Chantal Janzen; Geraldine Kemper (backstage)
- Coaches: Anouk; Ali B Lil Kleine; Waylon
- Winner: Sophia Kruithof
- Winning coach: Anouk
- Runner-up: Stef Classens

Release
- Original network: RTL 4
- Original release: 8 November 2019 – 28 February 2020

Season chronology
- ← Previous; Season 9

The tenth season of the Dutch reality singing competition The Voice of Holland premiered on 8 November 2019 on RTL 4. Host Martijn Krabbé, as well as the four coaches from the previous season, Lil Kleine, Waylon, Ali B and Anouk all returned, while Wendy van Dijk left to move to SBS6 and was replaced by Chantal Janzen as a host with Krabbé, also Jamai Loman was replaced by Geraldine Kemper as a backstage host.

Sophia Kruithof won the competition from team Anouk and Anouk became the winning mentor for the second time.

== Coaches and hosts ==
The Voice of Holland season 10 coaches

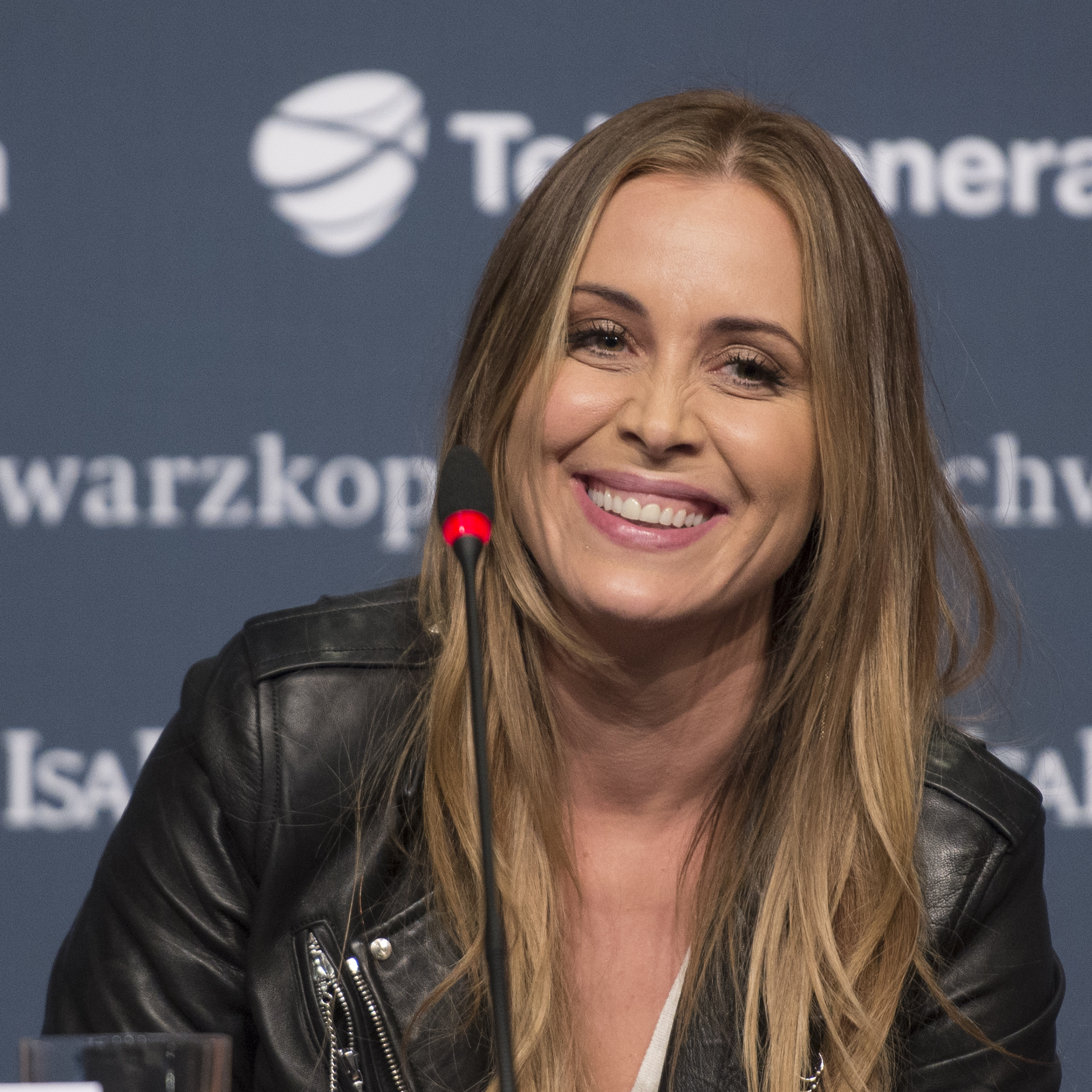
Anouk

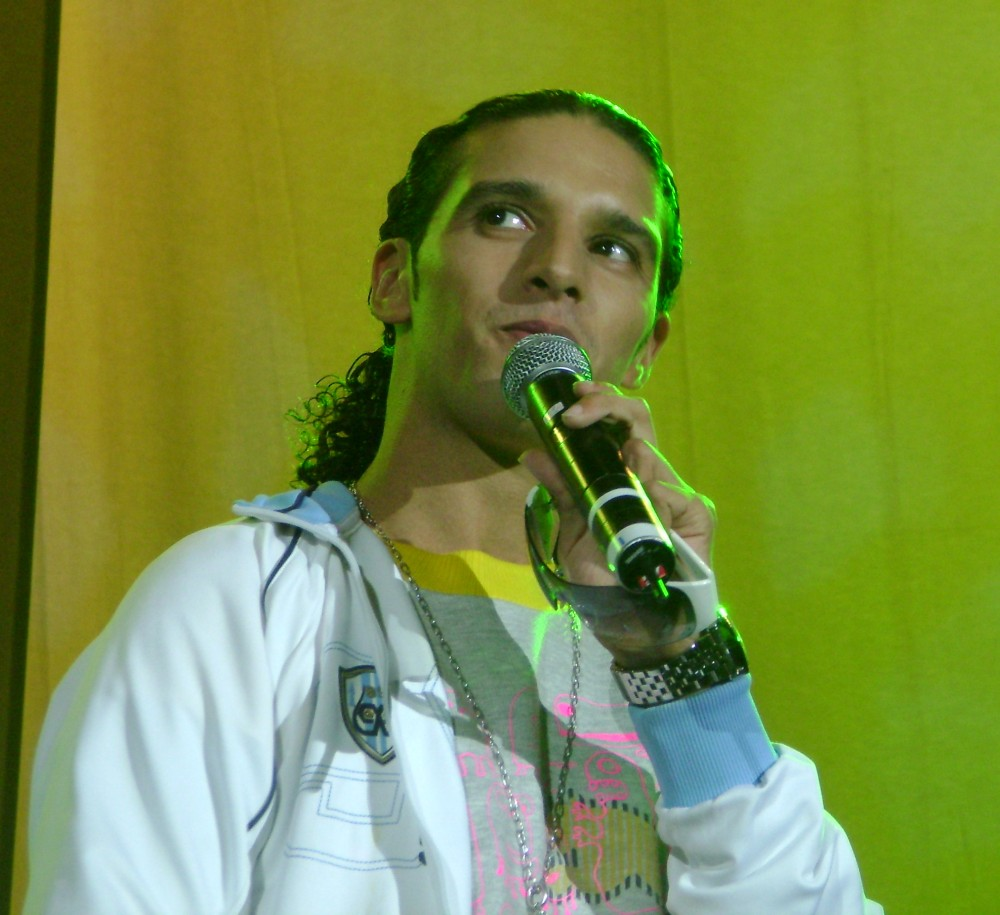
Ali B

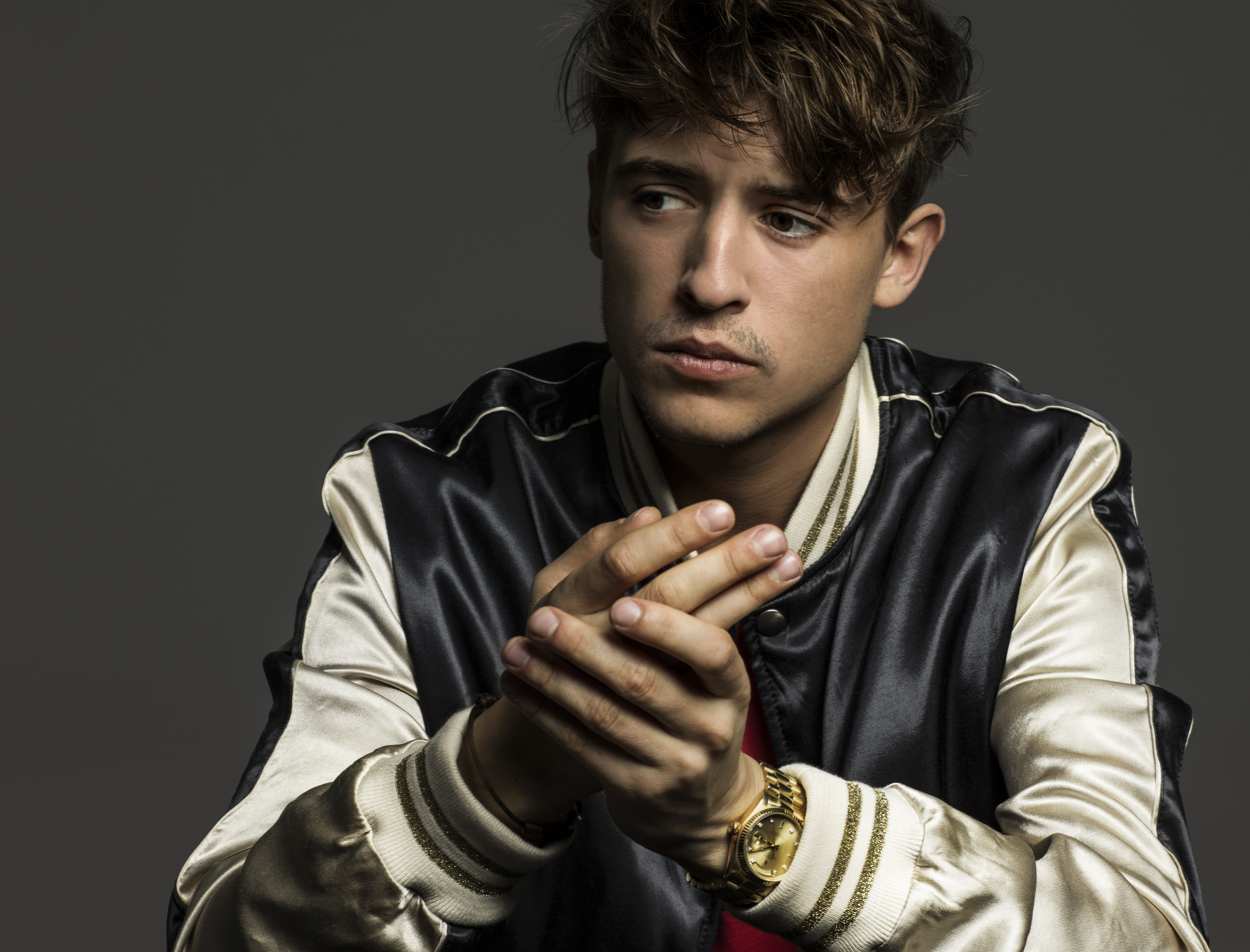
Lil' Kleine

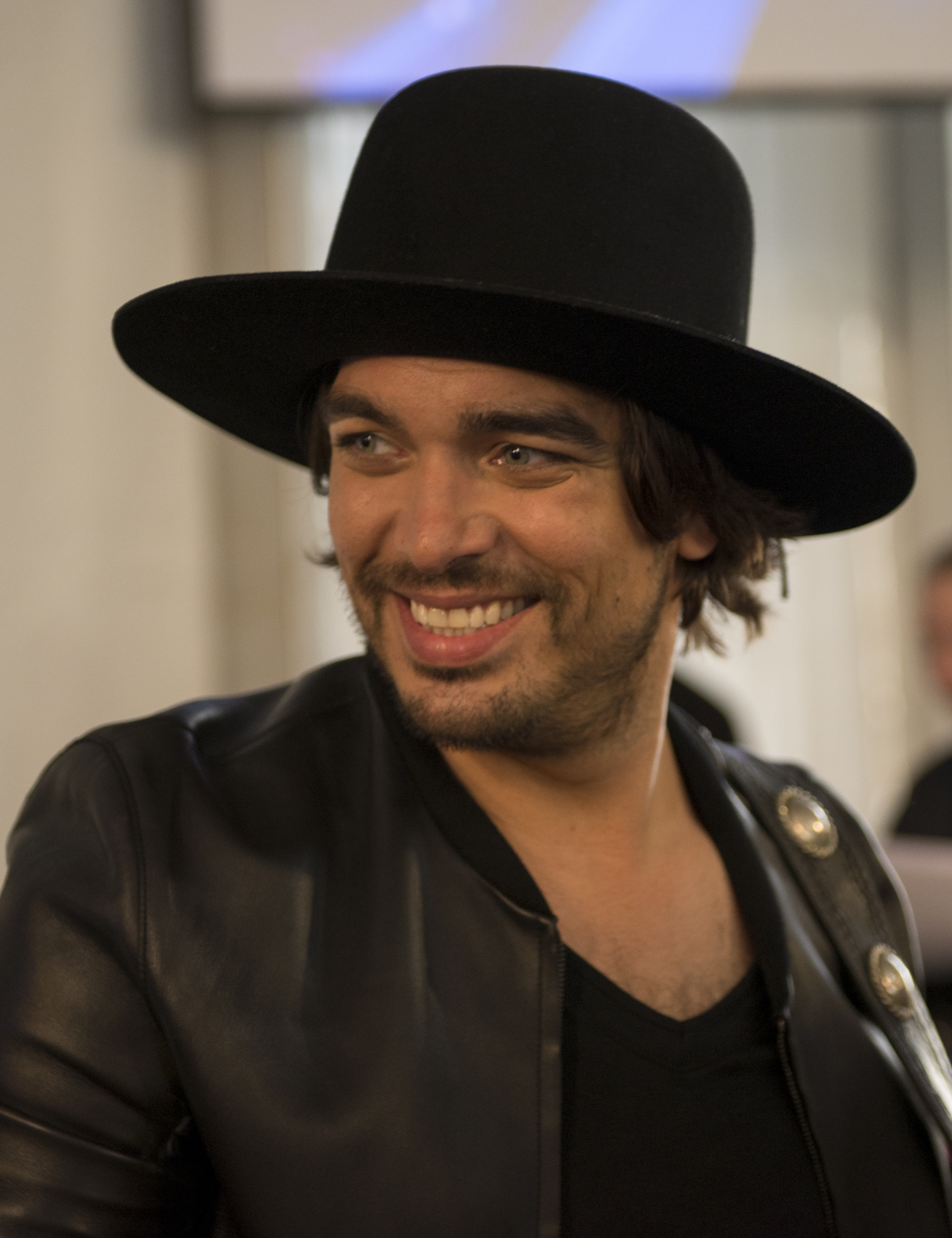
Waylon

In early 2019, Wendy van Dijk announced that she has moved from RTL 4 to SBS6 and therefore would not be able to return to the show as host. On 22 February 2019 it was announced Chantal Janzen will replace van Dijk as host for the tenth season. It has also been announced that Geraldine Kemper would replace Jamai Loman as backstage host. On 14 June 2019, it was announced via the show's broadcaster, RTL 4 and their Facebook page that Ali B, Waylon, Anouk and Lil' Kleine will all return for season 10.

== Teams ==
Color key

– Winner
– Runner-up
– Third place
– Fourth place

– Eliminated in the Live Shows
– Eliminated in the Knockout Rounds
– Artist was stolen by another coach (Name is struckthrough)
– Artist was stolen but was later switched with another artist and got eliminated
– Eliminated in the Battle Rounds

Coaches	Top 60 artists			
Lil' Kleine				
Lil' Kleine	Kes van den Broek	Danilo Kuiters	April Darby	Charine Eyny
Lil' Kleine	Anne Wilson	Lady Shaynah	Mitch Lodewick	Pilar Oreel
Lil' Kleine	Evelyn Van Den Elsen	~~Celine Dib~~	Esmée Smit	Richy Brown
Lil' Kleine	Aymar Torres	Jasmijn Hendriks	Marlane	Dion Metselaar
Lil' Kleine	Alisha			
Ali B				
Ali B	Daphne van Ditshuizen	Ayoub Maach	Fatimazohra	Sophie Mol
Ali B	Ravenna-Jade Caupain	Corleone	Brugklasbeatz	Dasilvian Bruce
Ali B	~~Kes van den Broek~~	Mitch Crown	Nigel Sean	Dalo
Ali B	Jeremy Garcia	Nelson Braveheart	Elroy & Rubenia	Rojay Griffith
Anouk				
Anouk	Sophia Kruithof	Sanne Huisman	C.J.	Fleur Raateland
Anouk	Zorah Lagerwerf	Ziggy Krassenberg	Noa Jansen	Celine Van Veldhoven
Anouk	~~Daphne van Ditshuizen~~	Meike Ubbink	Vivecka	Kaya van den Bosch
Anouk	Hiske Bongaarts	Jantien Volgers	Thysa de Bruijn	
Waylon				
Waylon	Stef Classens	Emma Boertien	Robin Buijs	Kirsten Fennis
Waylon	Pyro	Maaike de Groot	Céline Dib	Chendo Smit
Waylon	~~Zorah Lagerwerf~~	Hans Hannemann	Daredevils	Marlon Pichel
Waylon	Lars Koehoorn	Rick Lips	Julia Schutten	Britt Metten
Note: Italicized and capitalized names are stolen contestants (names struck through within former teams).

== Blind auditions ==
Color key

✔	Coach hit his/her "I WANT YOU" button
	Artist defaulted to this coach's team
	Artist elected to join this coach's team
	Artist eliminated with no coach pressing his or her "I WANT YOU" button

=== Episode 1 (November 8) ===
Order	Artist	Age	Song	Coaches' and contestants' choices			
Order	Artist	Age	Song	Lil' Kleine	Ali B	Anouk	Waylon
1	Emma Boertien	16	"My Way"	✔	✔	✔	✔
2	Daredevils	N/A	"Maniac"	—	✔	—	✔
3	Anne Wilson	24	"Jij Liet Me Vallen"	✔	✔	✔	✔
4	Valentine Florez	18	"Woman Like Me"	—	—	—	—
5	Maaike de Groot	22	"De Zee"	—	✔	—	✔
6	Dasilvian Bruce	27	"This Time"	✔	✔	✔	✔
7	Hiske Bongaarts	31	"Grenade"	✔	—	✔	—
8	Job Teunis	19	"You Let Me Walk Alone"	—	—	—	—
9	Aymar Torres	32	"Magalenha"/"Taki Taki"	✔	✔	✔	✔
10	Robin Buijs	19	"One and Only"	✔	✔	✔	✔

=== Episode 2 (November 15) ===
Order	Artist	Age	Song	Coaches' and contestants' choices			
Order	Artist	Age	Song	Lil' Kleine	Ali B	Anouk	Waylon
1	Meike Ubbink	19	"Alone"	✔	✔	✔	✔
2	Evelyn van den Elsen	27	"The Power of Love (Si Tu Eres Mi Hombre)"	✔	—	—	✔
3	Brugklasbeatz	N/A	"Too Lost in You"	✔	✔	✔	✔
4	Stan van Hoof	19	"Brabant"	—	—	—	—
5	Kirsten Fennis	29	"This Is Me"	—	✔	—	✔
6	Jeremy Garcia	22	"When I Was Your Man"	✔	✔	✔	✔
7	Sophia Kruithof	17	"Vincent"	✔	✔	✔	✔
8	Laurie Akkerman	24	"Without You"	—	—	—	—
9	Lars Koehoorn	21	"Love Runs Out"	—	—	—	✔
10	Charine Eyny	16	"Never Enough"	✔	✔	✔	✔
11	Ziggy Krassenberg	18	"Too Much Love Will Kill You"	✔	✔	✔	✔

=== Episode 3 (November 22) ===
Order	Artist	Age	Song	Coaches' and contestants' choices			
Order	Artist	Age	Song	Lil' Kleine	Ali B	Anouk	Waylon
1	Lady Shaynah	24	"How Will I Know"	✔	—	✔	✔
2	Fleur Raateland	19	"You Oughta Know"	✔	✔	✔	✔
3	Souhaila Boubkari	18	"Pour que tu m'aimes encore"	—	—	—	—
4	Hans Hannemann	34	"Me and Bobby McGee"	✔	✔	—	✔
5	Elroy & Rubenia	N/A	"Ain't No Mountain High Enough"	✔	✔	—	✔
6	Marlon Pichel	26	"With a Little Help From My Friends"	—	✔	—	✔
7	Kes van den Broek	18	"Breathin"	✔	✔	—	—
8	Mitch Crown	45	"All of Me"	—	✔	—	—
9	Eva van Beek	19	"Baby Love"	—	—	—	—
10	Esmée Smit	23	"Walk Me Home"	✔	✔	✔	✔
11	Ravenna-Jade Caupain	28	"A Change Is Gonna Come"	✔	✔	✔	✔

=== Episode 4 (November 29) ===
Order	Artist	Age	Song	Coaches' and contestants' choices			
Order	Artist	Age	Song	Lil' Kleine	Ali B	Anouk	Waylon
1	Sanne Huisman	23	"California Dreamin'"	✔	✔	✔	✔
2	Céline Dib	20	"Another Love"	✔	—	—	—
3	Pyro	N/A	"Where The Streets Have No Name"	—	✔	—	✔
4	Chiel Naber	32	"Binnen"	—	—	—	—
5	Marlane	24	"Als Je Zachtjes Zegt Ik Hou Van Jou"	✔	✔	—	—
6	April Darby	28	"You Don't Do It For Me Anymore"	✔	✔	✔	✔
7	Dalo	22	"Zij Was Van Mij"	—	✔	—	—
8	Nelson Braveheart	27	"X (EQUIS)"	✔	✔	—	—
9	Roos Klaassen	24	"Fix You"	—	—	—	—
10	Stef Classens	26	"Someone You Loved"	✔	✔	✔	✔
11	Vivecka	31	"All I Want"	✔	✔	✔	✔

=== Episode 5 (December 6) ===
Order	Artist	Age	Song	Coaches' and contestants' choices			
Order	Artist	Age	Song	Lil' Kleine	Ali B	Anouk	Waylon
1	Julia Schutten	19	"Sucker"	—	✔	—	✔
2	Tessa Bouwmeester	22	"Als Het Avond Is"	—	—	—	—
3	Nigel Sean	27	"Wereld Zonder Jou"	—	✔	✔	✔
4	Jasmijn Hendriks	19	"Idontwannabeyouanymore"	✔	—	—	—
5	Zorah Lagerwerf	18	"Always Remember Us This Way"	✔	✔	✔	✔
6	Roy van den Akker	38	"De Bestemming"	—	—	—	—
7	Richy Brown	37	"Feeling Good"	✔	✔	—	—
8	Noa Jansen	17	"Shallow"	✔	✔	✔	✔
9	Eva van der Meer	19	"Black Velvet"	—	—	—	—
10	Dion Metselaar	24	"The House of the Rising Sun"	✔	—	—	—
11	Thysa de Bruijn	20	"Girls Just Want to Have Fun"	✔	—	✔	—
12	Ayoub Maach	19	"Say Something"	✔	✔	✔	✔

=== Episode 6 (December 13) ===
Order	Artist	Age	Song	Coaches' and contestants' choices			
Order	Artist	Age	Song	Lil' Kleine	Ali B	Anouk	Waylon
1	Fatimazohra	25	"Let It Go"	✔	✔	✔	✔
2	Sophie Mol	24	"I'm Every Woman"	✔	✔	—	—
3	Wibrant Brontsema	22	"Onderweg"	—	—	—	—
4	Mitch Lodewick	20	"Shape of My Heart"	✔	—	—	—
5	Jantien Volgers	29	"Zeg Me Wie Je Ziet"	✔	✔	✔	✔
6	Rick Lips	18	"In My Blood"	—	✔	—	✔
7	Danilo Kuiters	21	"Waarom"	✔	✔	—	—
8	Britt Timmers	24	"Always"	—	—	—	—
9	Celine van Veldhoven	23	"Addicted to You"	✔	—	✔	—
10	Jonathan Vroege	25	"Sorry Seems To Be The Hardest Word"	—	—	—	—
11	C.J.	32	"Believe"	✔	—	✔	✔

=== Episode 7 (December 20) ===
Order	Artist	Age	Song	Coaches' and contestants' choices			
Order	Artist	Age	Song	Lil' Kleine	Ali B	Anouk	Waylon
1	Chendo Smit	21	"Dancing On My Own"	✔	✔	✔	✔
2	Alisha Ramcharan	23	"Eenzaam Zonder Jou"	✔	✔	—	—
3	Pilar Oreel	26	"Come Together"	✔	—	—	—
4	Leslie Weiss	24	"Don't Speak"	—	—	—	—
5	Daphne van Ditshuizen	20	"Beautiful Distraction"	✔	✔	✔	✔
6	Kiki Krijnen	18	"Youngblood"	—	—	—	—
7	Kaya van den Bosch	16	"Impossible"	—	—	✔	—
8	Rojay Griffith	45	"My Girl"	✔	✔	—	—
9	Daphne Maltha	27	"7 Rings"	—	—	—	—
10	Corleone	29	"Liefs uit Londen"	—	✔	—	—
11	Britt Metten	21	"Scared to Be Lonely"	—	✔	—	✔

== The Battle Rounds ==
Color key:

Artist won the Battle and advanced to the Knockout Rounds
Artist lost the Battle and was stolen by another coach, but was later switched with another artist and eliminated
Artist lost the Battle but was stolen by another coach and advanced to the Knockout Rounds
Artist lost the Battle and was eliminated

Episode	Coach	Order	Winner	Song	Loser	'Steal' result			
Episode	Coach	Order	Winner	Song	Loser	Lil Kleine	Ali B	Anouk	Waylon
Episode 8 (December 27)	Lil' Kleine	1	April Darby	"I Put A Spell On You"	Céline Dib	—N/a	✔	—	✔
Episode 8 (December 27)	Waylon	2	Kirsten Fennis	"Duurt Te Lang"	Britt Metten	—	—	—	—N/a
Episode 8 (December 27)	Ali B	3	Ravenna-Jade Caupain	"I Just Can't Stop Loving You"	Rojay Griffith	—	—N/a	—	—
Episode 8 (December 27)	Anouk	4	Noa Jansen	"No Air"	Kaya van den Bosch	—	✔	—N/a	—
Episode 8 (December 27)	Lil' Kleine	5	Anne Wilson	"De Vlieger"	Alisha	—N/a	—	—	—
Episode 8 (December 27)	Anouk	6	C.J.	"River Deep Mountain High"	Hiske Bongaarts	✔	—	—N/a	—
Episode 8 (December 27)	Waylon	7	Pyro	"American Woman / Are You Gonna Go My Way"	Daredevils	—	—	✔	—N/a
Episode 9 (January 3)	Ali B	1	Sophie Mol	"Faith"	Elroy & Rubenia	—	—N/a	—	—
Episode 9 (January 3)	Waylon	2	Stef Classens	"You Are the Reason"	Julia Schutten	—	—	—	—N/a
Episode 9 (January 3)	Lil' Kleine	3	Mitch Lodewick	"Chained To The Rhythm"	Dion Metselaar	—N/a	—	—	—
Episode 9 (January 3)	Anouk	4	Fleur Raateland	"People Help The People"	Thysa de Bruijn	—	—	—N/a	—
Episode 9 (January 3)	Ali B	5	Brugklasbeatz	"Despacito"	Nelson Braveheart	—	—N/a	—	—
Episode 9 (January 3)	Lil' Kleine	6	Danilo Kuiters	"Samen Zijn"	Marlane	—N/a	—	—	—
Episode 9 (January 3)	Anouk	7	Celine van Veldhoven	"Something's Got a Hold on Me"	Vivecka	—	✔	—N/a	—
Episode 10 (January 10)	Ali B	1	Fatimazohra	"Perfect"	Jeremy Garcia	—	—N/a	—	—
Episode 10 (January 10)	Waylon	2	Maaike de Groot	"Jackson"	Hans Hannemann	—	✔	—	—N/a
Episode 10 (January 10)	Lil' Kleine	3	Charine Eyny	"Versace on the Floor"	Jasmijn Hendriks	—N/a	—	—	—
Episode 10 (January 10)	Ali B	4	Corleone	"Rap Battle"	Dalo	—	—N/a	—	—
Episode 10 (January 10)	Ali B	4	Corleone	"Rap Battle"	Nigel Sean	—	—N/a	—	—
Episode 10 (January 10)	Anouk	5	Ziggy Krassenberg	"Losing My Religion"	Meike Ubbink	—	✔	—N/a	—
Episode 10 (January 10)	Waylon	6	Emma Boertien	"Somewhere Only We Know"	Zorah Lagerwerf	✔	✔	✔	—N/a
Episode 10 (January 10)	Lil' Kleine	7	Evelyn van den Elsen	"Livin' La Vida Loca"	Aymar Torres	—N/a	—	—	—
Episode 11 (January 17)	Lil' Kleine	1	Pilar Oreel	"Ain't That A Kick In The Head?"	Richy Brown	—N/a	—	—	—
Episode 11 (January 17)	Ali B	2	Ayoub Maach	"Menak Wla Meni/Verleden Tijd"	Kes van den Broek	✔	—N/a	—	✔
Episode 11 (January 17)	Waylon	3	Chendo Smit	"BLOW"	Rick Lips	—	—	—	—N/a
Episode 11 (January 17)	Waylon	3	Chendo Smit	"BLOW"	Lars Koehoorn	—	—	—	—N/a
Episode 11 (January 17)	Anouk	4	Sanne Huisman	"You Say"	Daphne van Ditshuizen	—	✔	—N/a	✔
Episode 11 (January 17)	Ali B	5	Dasilvian Bruce	"Niemand"	Mitch Crown	—	—N/a	—	—
Episode 11 (January 17)	Lil' Kleine	6	Lady Shaynah	"Domino"	Esmée Smit	—N/a	—	—	—
Episode 11 (January 17)	Anouk	7	Sophia Kruithof	"Hoe Het Danst"	Jantien Volgers	—	—	—N/a	—
Episode 11 (January 17)	Waylon	8	Robin Buijs	"Cry To Me"	Marlon Pichel	—	—	—	—N/a

== The Knockouts ==
This season, guest coaches were invited to substitute for two coaches whose teams did not perform during the episode. Each episode featured two guest coaches who sat in the red chair along with two regular coaches whose teams performed. Episode 12, which featured performances from team Waylon and team Lil Kleine, brought back former coaches Marco Borsato and Sanne Hans in the places of Ali B and Anouk. In episode 13, team Ali B and team Anouk performed for their coaches and guest coaches Angela Groothuizen and Ronnie Flex.

Color key
– Contestant was eliminated, either immediately (indicated by a "—" in the "Switched with" column) or switched with another contestant
– Contestant was not switched out and advanced to the Live Shows

Artists' performances
Episode	Coach	Order	Artist	Song	Result	Switched with
Episode 12 (January 24)	Waylon	1	Chendo Smit	"Hold Back The River"	Eliminated	—N/a
Episode 12 (January 24)	Waylon	2	Robin Buijs	"Need Your Love So Bad"	Advanced	—N/a
Episode 12 (January 24)	Waylon	3	PYRO	" When the Party's Over"	Eliminated	—N/a
Episode 12 (January 24)	Waylon	4	Céline Dib	"Liar"	Eliminated	Chendo Smit
Episode 12 (January 24)	Waylon	5	Stef Classens	"Love Someone"	Advanced	Céline Dib
Episode 12 (January 24)	Waylon	6	Maaike De Groot	"Mercy"	Eliminated	—
Episode 12 (January 24)	Waylon	7	Emma Boertien	"The Voice Within"	Advanced	PYRO
Episode 12 (January 24)	Waylon	8	Kirsten Fennis	"Stronger (What Doesn't Kill You)"	Eliminated	—
Episode 12 (January 24)	Lil' Kleine	1	Lady Shaynah	"NASA"	Eliminated	—N/a
Episode 12 (January 24)	Lil' Kleine	2	Danilo Kuiters	"'K Heb Je Lief"	Advanced	—N/a
Episode 12 (January 24)	Lil' Kleine	3	Evelyn van den Elsen	"Underneath Your Clothes"	Eliminated	—N/a
Episode 12 (January 24)	Lil' Kleine	4	Pilar Oreel	"I Say A Little Prayer"	Eliminated	—
Episode 12 (January 24)	Lil' Kleine	5	Mitch Lodewick	"There's Nothing Holding Me Back"	Eliminated	Pilar Oreel
Episode 12 (January 24)	Lil' Kleine	6	Charine Eyny	"Writing's On The Wall"	Eliminated	Mitch Lodewick
Episode 12 (January 24)	Lil' Kleine	7	April Darby	"Run To You"	Advanced	Lady Shaynah
Episode 12 (January 24)	Lil' Kleine	8	Anne Wilson	"Ik Voel Me Zo Verdomd Alleen"	Eliminated	—
Episode 12 (January 24)	Lil' Kleine	9	Kes van den Broek	"Hij Is Van Mij"	Advanced	Charine Eyny
Episode 13 (January 31)	Anouk	1	Celine Van Veldhoven	"Lost on You"	Eliminated	—N/a
Episode 13 (January 31)	Anouk	2	Sophia Kruithof	"Million Years Ago"	Advanced	—N/a
Episode 13 (January 31)	Anouk	3	Ziggy Krassenberg	"Before I Go"	Eliminated	—N/a
Episode 13 (January 31)	Anouk	4	Sanne Huisman	"Strong"	Advanced	Celine Van Veldhoven
Episode 13 (January 31)	Anouk	5	Noa Jansen	"Whataya Want From Me"	Eliminated	—
Episode 13 (January 31)	Anouk	6	Fleur Raateland	"Creep"	Eliminated	Ziggy Krassenberg
Episode 13 (January 31)	Anouk	7	Zorah Lagerwerf	"What About Us"	Eliminated	—
Episode 13 (January 31)	Anouk	8	C.J	"Don't Let Me Be Misunderstood"	Advanced	Fleur Raateland
Episode 13 (January 31)	Ali B	1	Brugklasbeatz	"Don't Phunk With My Heart"	Eliminated	—N/a
Episode 13 (January 31)	Ali B	2	Fatimazohra	"Dance Monkey"	Advanced	—N/a
Episode 13 (January 31)	Ali B	3	Ayoub Maach	"Halo"	Advanced	—N/a
Episode 13 (January 31)	Ali B	4	Dasilvian Bruce	"U Remind Me"	Eliminated	—
Episode 13 (January 31)	Ali B	5	Daphne Van Ditshuizen	"Gravity"	Advanced	Brugklasbeatz
Episode 13 (January 31)	Ali B	6	Corleone	"Reünie"	Eliminated	—
Episode 13 (January 31)	Ali B	7	Ravenna-Jane Caupain	"If I Were a Boy"	Eliminated	—
Episode 13 (January 31)	Ali B	8	Sophie Mol	"Higher Love"	Eliminated	—

== The Live Shows ==
Color key
– Artist wasn't chosen by the public nor by his/her coach and was eliminated
– Artist was voted through by public's vote
– Artist was voted through by coach's vote

=== Week 1 & 2: Top 12 (February 7 & 14) ===
This season, the first round of the Live shows is team-based for the first time since the fifth season. Two teams would perform during each live show, with one artist saved by the public, one saved by their coach, and the remaining one eliminated. The first night covers the six artists from coaches Lil' Kleine and Anouk, while the second night features performances from team Ali B and Waylon.

Episode	Order	Coach	Artist	Song	Result
Episode 14 (February 7)	1	Anouk	C.J.	"Set Fire To The Rain"	Eliminated
Episode 14 (February 7)	2	Anouk	Sanne Huisman	"River"	Coach's vote
Episode 14 (February 7)	3	Anouk	Sophia Kruithof	"Keep Your Head Up"	Public's vote
Episode 14 (February 7)	4	Lil' Kleine	April Darby	"Crazy in Love"	Eliminated
Episode 14 (February 7)	5	Lil' Kleine	Danilo Kuiters	"Zijn Het Je Ogen"	Coach's vote
Episode 14 (February 7)	6	Lil' Kleine	Kes van den Broek	"Let You Love Me"	Public's vote
Episode 15 (February 14)	1	Ali B	Ayoub Maach	"Angel"	Public's vote
Episode 15 (February 14)	2	Ali B	Fatimazohra	"Good As Hell"	Eliminated
Episode 15 (February 14)	3	Ali B	Daphne van Ditshuizen	"Miracle"	Coach's vote
Episode 15 (February 14)	4	Waylon	Robin Buijs	"Piece of My Heart"	Eliminated
Episode 15 (February 14)	5	Waylon	Emma Boertien	"Love of My Life"	Public's vote
Episode 15 (February 14)	6	Waylon	Stef Classens	"Used To Love"	Coach's vote

Non-competition performances
Order	Performer	Song
14.1	Duncan Laurence, April Darby and Sanne Huisman	"Love Don't Hate It"
14.2	Team Anouk	"Dream On"
14.3	Kensington	"Uncharted"
14.4	Team Lil' Kleine	"Kon Ik Maar Even Bij Je Zijn"
15.1	Dennis van Aarssen, Ayoub Maach and Stef Classens	"L-O-V-E"
15.2	Team Ali B	"I Don't Care"
15.3	Tina: The Musical	"Nutbush City Limits" / "Proud Mary"
15.4	Team Waylon	"Desperado"

=== Week 3: Crossbattles (February 21) ===
With the eliminations of Danilo Kuiters and Kes van den Broek, Lil Kleine had no more acts left on his team to compete, making it the second season in a row that he had lost his team prior to the final, the first time being the ninth season. Also, Daphne Van Ditshuizen was the second stolen artist to have ever made it to the finals in the show's history, the first one being Samantha Steenwijk on the eighth season. Also, both stolen artist originally came from Team Anouk.

Color key:

Artist won the Crossbattle and advanced to the Final
Artist lost the Crossbattle and was eliminated

Order	Crossbattle	Artist	Song	Song	Artist
1	Team Waylon vs. Team Ali B	Stef Classens	"I Can't Make You Love Me"	"Zina/Parijs"	Ayoub Maach
2	Team Ali B vs. Team Anouk	Daphne Van Ditshuizen	"Empire State of Mind"	"Lose You To Love Me"	Sanne Huisman
3	Team Anouk vs. Team Lil Kleine	Sophia Kruithof	"If You Go Away"	"Zij Maakt Het Verschil"	Danilo Kuiters
4	Team Lil Kleine vs. Team Waylon	Kes van den Broek	"The Climb"	"Don't Play That Song For Me"	Emma Boertien

=== Week 4: Final (February 28) ===
Coach	Artist	Order	Reprise song	Order	Duet song	Order	Single	Result
Ali B	Daphne van Ditshuizen	1	"Beautiful Distraction"	8	"Don't Start Now" (with Davina Michelle)	N/A (Already Eliminated		Fourth Place
Anouk	Sophia Kruithof	7	"Vincent"	2	"Lost Without You" (with Jacqueline Govaert)	10	Alaska	Winner
Waylon	Stef Classens	3	"Someone You Loved"	6	"Rewrite The Stars" (with Anne-Marie)	9	"Carried Away"	Runner-up
Waylon	Emma Boertien	5	"My Way"	4	"Islands In The Stream" (with Waylon)	N/A (Already Eliminated)		Third Place

Non-competition performances
Order	Performer	Song
16.1	Di-rect, Sanne Huisman en Stef Classens	"Times Are Changing"
16.2	Di-rect	Soldier On

== Elimination Charts ==
=== Overall ===
Color key
Artist's info

- Artist from Team Lil Kleine
- Artist from Team Ali B

- Artist from Team Anouk
- Artist from Team Waylon

Result details

- Winner
- Runner-up
- Third place
- Fourth place

- Saved by public vote
- Saved by his/her coach
- Artist was eliminated

Live show results per week
Artist	Week 1	Week 2	Week 3	Finals
Sophia Kruithof	Safe		Safe	Winner
Stef Classens		Safe	Safe	Runner-up
Emma Boertien		Safe	Safe	3rd Place
Daphne van Ditshuizen		Safe	Safe	4th Place
Kes van den Broek	Safe		Eliminated	Eliminated (Week 3)
Danilo Kuiters	Safe		Eliminated	Eliminated (Week 3)
Sanne Huisman	Safe		Eliminated	Eliminated (Week 3)
Ayoub Maach		Safe	Eliminated	Eliminated (Week 3)
Robin Buijs		Eliminated	Eliminated (Week 2)	
Fatimazohra		Eliminated	Eliminated (Week 2)	
April Darby	Eliminated	Eliminated (Week 1)		
C.J.	Eliminated	Eliminated (Week 1)		

=== Team ===
Color key
Artist's info

- Artist from Team Lil Kleine
- Artist from Team Ali B

- Artist from Team Anouk
- Artist from Team Waylon

Result details

- Winner
- Runner-up
- Third place
- Fourth place

- Artist was eliminated

Live show results per week
Artist	Week 1	Week 2	Week 3	Finals
Danilo Kuiters	Coach's save		Eliminated	
Kes van den Broek	Public's vote		Eliminated	
April Darby	Eliminated			
Daphne van Ditshuizen		Coach's save	Public's vote	Fourth Place
Ayoub Maach		Public's vote	Eliminated	
Fatimazohra		Eliminated		
Sophia Kruithof	Public's vote		Public's vote	Winner
Sanne Huisman	Coach's save		Eliminated	
C.J.	Eliminated			
Stef Classens		Coach's save	Public's vote	Runner-up
Emma Boertien		Public's vote	Public's vote	Third Place
Robin Buijs		Eliminated		

== Artists' appearances in other media ==
- Anne Wilson participated in The voice of Holland season 1 as a member of team Jeroen (with the name Anne Schellekens) and The voice of Holland season 4 as a member of team Ali B. She was eliminated in the Battle rounds. Next to that, she participated in Holland's got talent season 1.
- Robin Buijs participated in The voice Kids season 4 as a member of team Borsato, she became runner-up.
- Meike Ubbink participated in The voice Kids season 4 as a member of team Angela, she was eliminated in the Battle rounds.
- Stan van Hoof participated in The voice Kids season 4 as a member of team Borsato, he was eliminated in the Battle rounds.
- Ayoub Maach participated in The voice Kids season 3 as a member of team Borsato, he was the winner of that season.
- April Darby participated in the musical 'The Bodyguard'. She was the alternate Rachel Marron.
- Danilo Kuiters participated in The voice of Holland season 7, but no one turned for him during his blind audition.
- Mitch Lodewick participated in the Dutch Idols season 5, he didn't make it to the liveshows. He participated again in the Dutch Idols season 6 and he placed third.
- Ziggy Krassenberg participated in the Dutch Idols season 6, where he did not make it to the liveshows.
- Esmée Smit participated in the Dutch program Topper Gezocht, which she won and got a performance with De Toppers.
- Jasmijn Hendriks participated in the first season of the Dutch version of All Together Now, where she did not end on one of the three chairs.
- Lady Shaynah participated in the first season of the Dutch version of All Together Now, where she became second in her episode.
- Alisha Ramcharan participated in The voice of Holland season 6, but no one turned for her during her blind audition. Next to that, she participated in the first season of the Dutch version of All Together Now, where she became second in her episode.
- Rick Lips participated in the first season of the Dutch programme 'The Talent Project', where he became third.
- Céline Dib participated in The voice Kids season 2 as a part of team Borsato, where she was eliminated in the Battle rounds. She also participated in Holland's got talent season 9, as a duo with her father. Despite their golden buzzer, they were eliminated in the liveshows.
- Thysa de Bruijn participated in the Dutch Idols season 5, where she did not make it to the liveshows.
- Jeremy Garcia participated in the first season of the Dutch version of All Together Now, where he did not end on stage.
- Nigel Sean was one of the 100 judges in the first season of the Dutch version of All Together Now.
- Richy Brown participated in the Dutch X Factor season 1, where he became second.
- Roy van den Akker and Richy Brown were both part of the group LA: The Voices.
- in 2014, Stef Classens won the third season of De beste singer-songwriter van Nederland
- C.J.'s real name is Jordan Lee McGuire, a registered sex offender in the United States

== Ratings ==
Episode	Airdate	Total	Total with late watching
The Blind Auditions 1	November 8, 2019	1.960.000	2.308.000
The Blind Auditions 2	November 15, 2019	1.969.000	2.219.000
The Blind Auditions 3	November 22, 2019	1.983.000	2.179.000
The Blind Auditions 4	November 29, 2019	1.792.000	2.005.000
The Blind Auditions 5	December 6, 2019	1.891.000	2.081.000
The Blind Auditions 6	December 13, 2019	1.759.000	1.971.000
The Blind Auditions 7	December 20, 2019	1.749.000	2.051.000
The Battles 1	December 27, 2019	1.646.000	2.018.000
The Battles 2	January 3, 2020	1.667.000	1.900.000
The Battles 3	January 10, 2020	1.786.000	1.984.000
The Battles 4	January 17, 2020	1.707.000	1.937.000
The Knockouts 1	January 24, 2020	1.727.000	1.992.000
The Knockouts 2	January 31, 2020	1.656.000	1.834.000
Team Anouk & Lil' Kleine	February 7, 2020	1.705.000	1.930.000
Team Ali B & Waylon	February 14, 2020	1.672.000	1.800.000
Semifinals (top 8)	February 21, 2020	1.577.000	1.788.000
Finals (top 4)	February 28, 2020	1.830.000	2.040.000
