= Force 10 from Navarone =

Force 10 from Navarone may refer to:

- Force 10 from Navarone (novel), a 1968 novel by Alistair MacLean
- Force 10 from Navarone (film), a 1978 British film loosely based on the novel

== See also ==
- The Guns of Navarone (disambiguation)
