= The Voice of Holland season 9 =

Season of The Voice of Holland

The Voice of Holland
- Season 9
- Hosted by: Martijn Krabbé; Wendy van Dijk; Jamai Loman (backstage)
- Coaches: Lil Kleine; Anouk; Ali B Waylon
- Winner: Dennis Van Aarssen
- Winning coach: Waylon
- Runner-up: Navarone

Release
- Original network: RTL 4
- Original release: 2 November 2018 – 22 February 2019

Season chronology
- ← Previous; Season 8 Next → Season 10

The ninth season of the Dutch reality singing competition The Voice of Holland premiered on 2 November 2018 on RTL 4. Hosts Martijn Krabbé, Wendy van Dijk, and Jamai Loman as well as three season 8 coaches, Waylon, and Ali B and Anouk all returned, while Sanne Hans was replaced with Lil Kleine.

Dennis Van Aarssen won the competition from team Waylon and Waylon became the winning mentor for the second time.

== Coaches and hosts ==
The Voice of Holland season 9 coaches

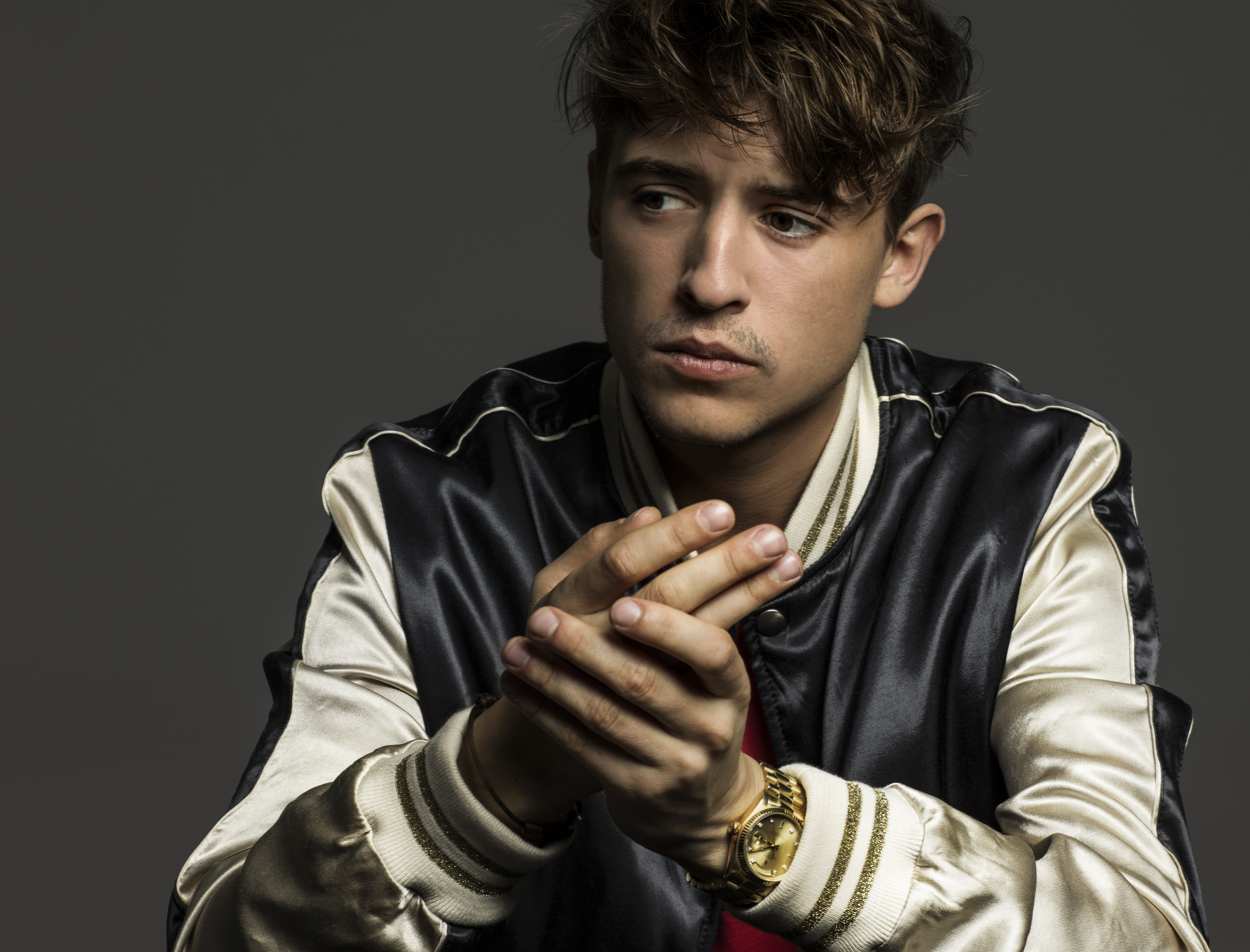
Lil' Kleine

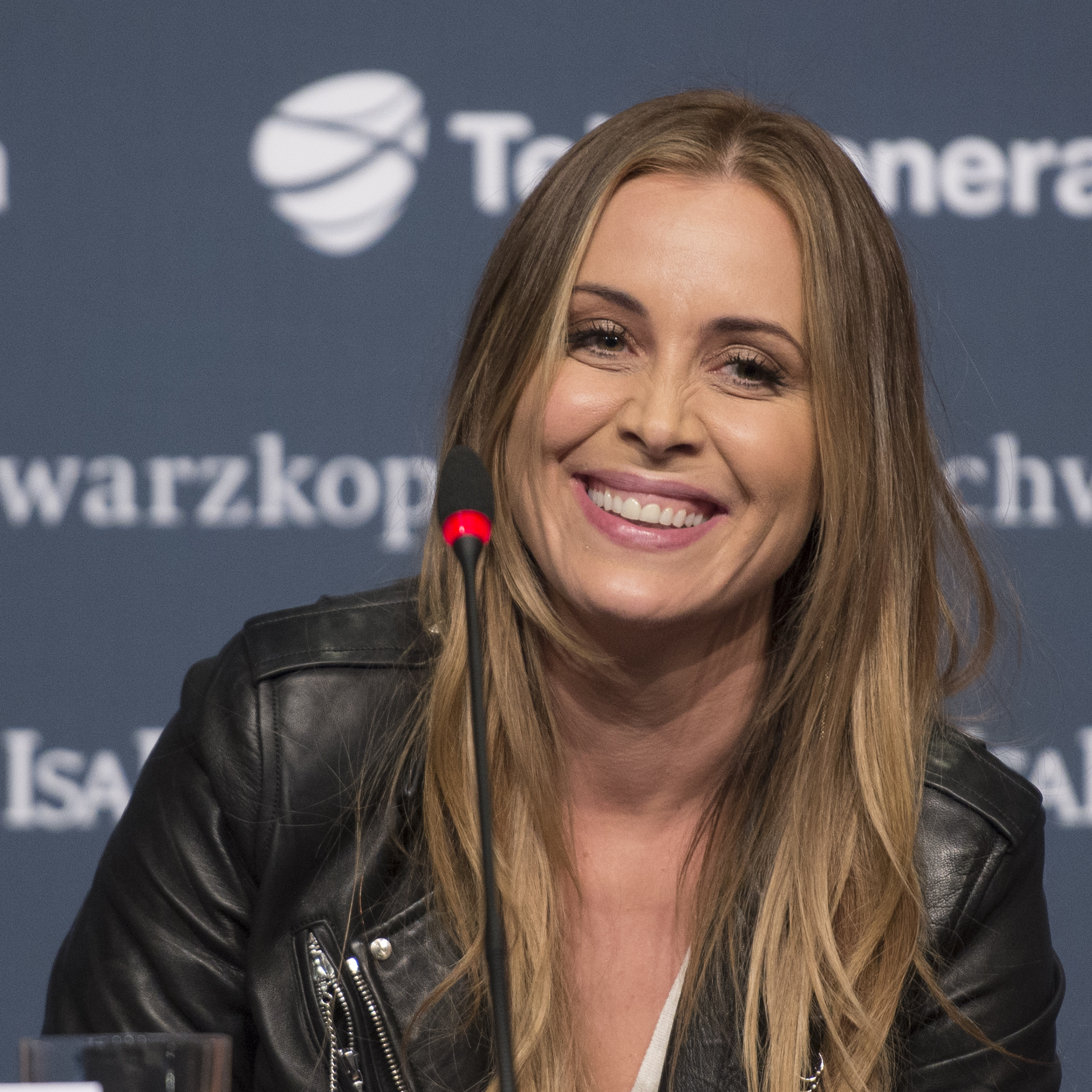
Anouk

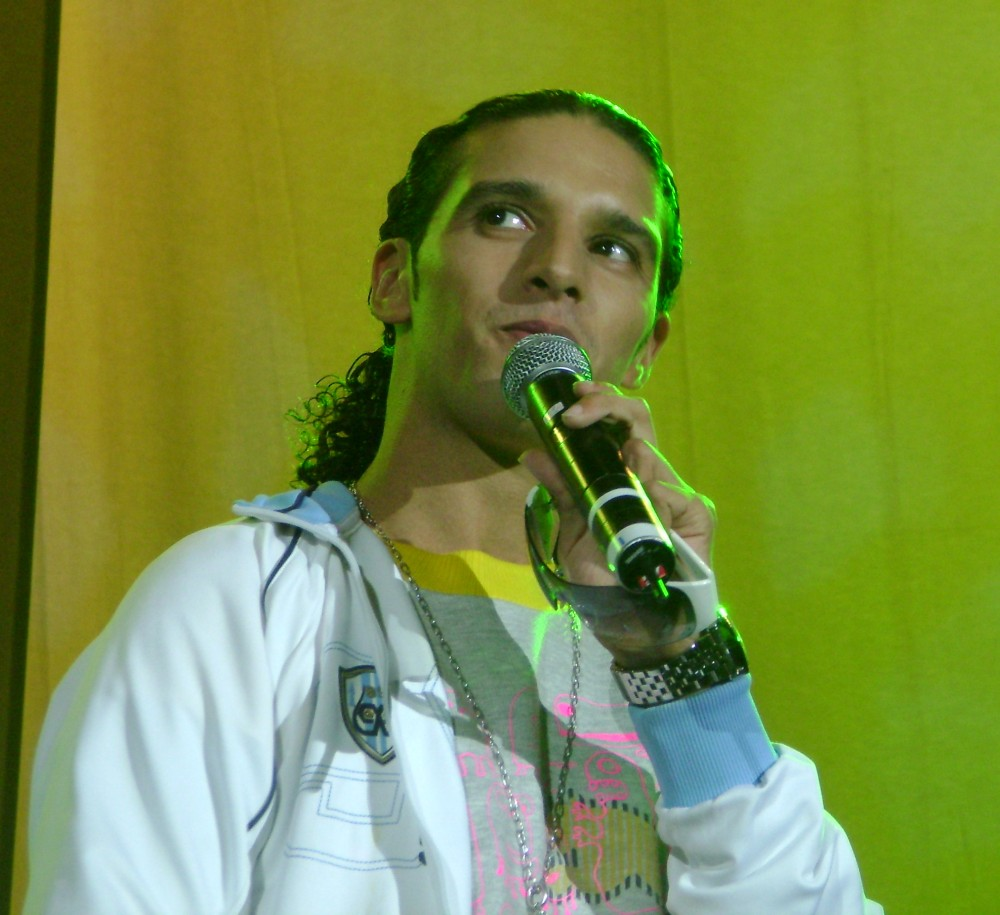
Ali B

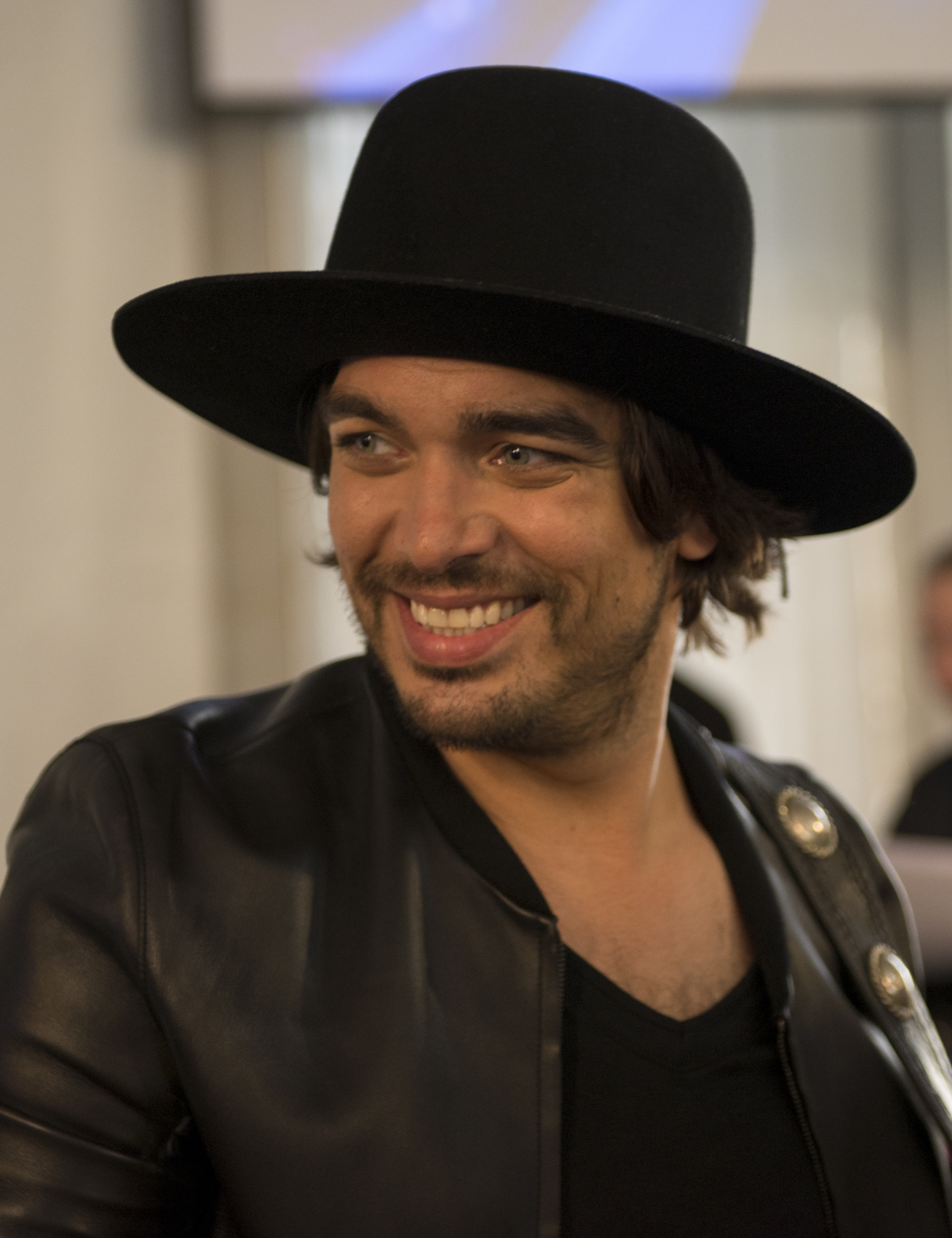
Waylon

During the Grand Finale of season 8 broadcast on February 16, 2018, it was announced that Sanne Hans would not be returning to the show for the ninth season and would be replaced by rapper Lil Kleine. Waylon, Ali B and Anouk returned as coaches while Martijn Krabbé, Wendy van Dijk, and Jamai Loman all returned as hosts.

== Teams ==
Color key

– Winner
– Runner-up
– Third place
– Fourth place
– Eliminated in the Live Shows

– Eliminated in the Knockout Rounds
– Eliminated in the Knockout Rounds, but got signed to a label
– Artist was stolen by another coach (name is struckthrough)
– Artist was stolen but was later switched with another artist and got eliminated
– Eliminated in the Battle Rounds

Coaches	Top 59 Artists				
Lil' Kleine					
Lil' Kleine	Quido Van de Graaf	Kimberly Fransens	Talita Blijd	Nika Pantovic	Sophie van der Stok
Lil' Kleine	Mentissa Aziza	Collin Hoeve	Veerle Barbé	Natascha Bessez	Norah Gaanderse
Lil' Kleine	LAURA	Ginger	Mariëlle Flens	Luigiano Paals	Chevelly Cooman
Lil' Kleine	Raffie van Maren				
Anouk					
Anouk	Navarone	Mikki van Wijk	Irene Dings	Cleo Vlogman	Mannus ter Avest
Anouk	Sanne Veltman	Jelle Glasbergen	Jackie Lou	~~Sanne de Winter~~	Iris Noëlle
Anouk	Ruben Anthony	Jet Van Der Steen	Billy Maluw	Sterre Tuijl	Lyall Silié
Ali B					
Ali B	Menno Aben	Sarah-Jane	Debrah Jade	Zoë Livay	Béla Becht
Ali B	Niels Hereijgers	Owen Playfair	Evelien van Buren	Hard2Get	Maya Shanti
Ali B	Kevin Storm	Walter De Kok	Wytse Visser	Amy Mielatz	JoHaLee
Ali B	Olorun	Earl Scott			
Waylon					
Waylon	Dennis Van Aarssen	Patricia Van Haastrecht	Bryan B	Sanne De Winter	Sascha van den Kerckhove
Waylon	Raigny Jozephia	Jade PraiZe	Luminize	~~Talita Blijd~~	~~Hard2Get~~
Waylon	~~Jackie Lou~~	Xerxes Naseri	Yentl Pool	M'lissa	Nate James
Note: Italicized and capitalized names are stolen contestants (names struck through within former teams).

== Blind auditions ==
Color key

✔	Coach hit his/her "I WANT YOU" button
	Artist defaulted to this coach's team
	Artist elected to join this coach's team
	Artist eliminated with no coach pressing his or her "I WANT YOU" button

=== Episode 1 (November 2) ===
Order	Artist	Age	Song	Coaches' and contestants' choices			
Order	Artist	Age	Song	Lil' Kleine	Anouk	Ali B	Waylon
1	Dennis van Aarssen	24	"That's Life"	✔	✔	✔	✔
2	Jade PraiZe	28	"Love Runs Out"	✔	✔	—	✔
3	Ewald Gomes	27	"Ain't Nobody"	—	—	—	—
4	Navarone	N/A	"Whole Lotta Love"	✔	✔	✔	✔
5	Chevelly Cooman	17	"Ben"	✔	✔	✔	✔
6	Ginger	25	"Papa" (original song)/ "Treur Niet"	✔	—	✔	—
7	Anniek Lassche	29	"Jerusalem"	—	—	—	—
8	Maya Shanti	21	"Friends"	✔	—	✔	✔
9	Evelien van Buren	17	"Dear Future Husband"	✔	—	✔	✔
10	Talita Blijd	27	"Rise"	—	—	✔	✔
11	Menno Aben	18	"Make It Rain"	✔	✔	✔	✔

=== Episode 2 (November 9) ===
Order	Artist	Age	Song	Coaches' and contestants' choices			
Order	Artist	Age	Song	Lil' Kleine	Anouk	Ali B	Waylon
1	Sarah-Jane	32	"Nothing Compares 2 U"	✔	✔	✔	✔
2	Ruben Anthony	40	"Another Day"	✔	✔	✔	✔
3	Sanne Veltman	16	"Happier"	—	✔	—	—
4	Robert Lissone	34	"I'm Still Standing"	—	—	—	—
5	Natascha Bessez	30	"Finesse"	✔	—	—	—
6	Sanne de Winter	34	"All I Ask"	✔	✔	✔	✔
7	Hard2Get	N/A	"Treat You Better"	—	—	✔	✔
8	Bo Neeleman	27	"Dance With Somebody"	—	—	—	—
9	Quido van de Graaf	27	"Wat Is Dan Liefde"	✔	—	✔	✔
10	Nikki Wennekes	27	"How Come You Don't Call Me"	—	—	—	—
11	Xerxes Naseri	24	"Margherita"	—	—	✔	✔
12	Patricia van Haastrecht	29	"Rise Up"	✔	✔	✔	✔

=== Episode 3 (November 16) ===
Order	Artist	Age	Song	Coaches' and contestants' choices			
Order	Artist	Age	Song	Lil' Kleine	Anouk	Ali B	Waylon
1	M'lissa	21	"Feel It Still"	✔	✔	✔	✔
2	JoHaLee	35	"Leef"	✔	—	✔	—
3	Sascha van den Kerckhove	19	"She's Out of My Life"	✔	—	✔	✔
4	James Stefano	32	"When You Love Someone"	—	—	—	—
5	Amy Mielatz	23	"Thinking of You"	✔	—	✔	—
6	Imgracia Nunnely	31	"Betekenis"	—	—	—	—
7	Cleo Vlogman	22	"Fine China	—	✔	✔	—
8	Kimberly Fransens	26	"My Heart Will Go On"	✔	✔	✔	✔
9	Moor Park	N/A	"Use Somebody"	—	—	—	—
10	Mariëlle Flens	24	"Ik Voel Me Zo Verdomd Alleen"	✔	—	✔	✔
11	Sophie van der Stok	25	"At Last"	✔	✔	✔	✔

=== Episode 4 (November 23) ===
Order	Artist	Age	Song	Coaches' and contestants' choices			
Order	Artist	Age	Song	Lil' Kleine	Anouk	Ali B	Waylon
1	Yentl Pool	31	"The Winner Takes It All"	✔	—	✔	✔
2	Béla Becht	25	"How Will I Know"	✔	—	✔	✔
3	Nika Pantovic	27	"Yesterday"	✔	—	✔	✔
4	Romy de Proost	19	"Havana"	—	—	—	—
5	Luminize	N/A	"Lady Marmalade"	—	—	✔	✔
6	Earl Scott	34	"Versace on the Floor"	✔	✔	✔	✔
7	Nathalie Blue	18	"Friends"	—	—	—	—
8	Raigny Jozephia	23	"Parijs"	—	✔	—	✔
9	Keje	23	"Kid K"	—	—	—	—
10	Billy Maluw	34	"A Change Is Gonna Come"	✔	✔	✔	—
11	Iris Noëlle	22	"Piece By Piece"	✔	✔	✔	✔

=== Episode 5 (November 30) ===
Order	Artist	Age	Song	Coaches' and contestants' choices			
Order	Artist	Age	Song	Lil' Kleine	Anouk	Ali B	Waylon
1	Jet van der Steen	16	"Turning Tables"	✔	✔	✔	✔
2	LAURA	23	"Komt Wel Goed Schatje" (original song)	✔	—	✔	—
3	Niels Hereijgers	35	"Leave a Light On"	✔	—	✔	✔
4	Kim Sandee	26	"Wolves"	—	—	—	—
5	Owen Playfair	20	"Human Nature"	✔	—	✔	—
6	Victoria Nicol	33	"Licence to Kill"	—	—	—	—
7	Zoë Livay	18	"Hometown Glory"	—	—	✔	—
8	Jackie Lou	21	"Imagine"	✔	—	✔	✔
9	Debrah Jade	27	"If I Ain't Got You"	✔	✔	✔	✔
10	Mattanja Joy Bradley	37	"Wake Me Up!"	—	—	—	—
11	Sterre Tuijl	21	"Jessie"	—	✔	✔	—
12	Lyall Silié	19	"Lay Me Down"	✔	✔	✔	✔

=== Episode 6 (December 7) ===
Order	Artist	Age	Song	Coaches' and contestants' choices			
Order	Artist	Age	Song	Lil' Kleine	Anouk	Ali B	Waylon
1	Bryan B	50	"When a Man Loves a Woman"	✔	✔	✔	✔
2	Mikki van Wijk	16	"In The Name Of Love"	—	✔	✔	✔
3	Henri Groenewold	50	"Terug Naar Jou" (original song)/"Back to Black"	—	—	—	—
4	Olorun	N/A	"Leun Op Mij"	—	—	✔	—
5	Raffie van Maren	19	"This Town"	✔	✔	—	✔
6	Romy Lammerts	16	"Too Good at Goodbyes"	—	—	—	—
7	Collin Hoeve	34	"#Addicted" (original song)	✔	—	—	—
8	Luigiano Paals	25	"Scared to Be Lonely"	✔	—	✔	—
9	Gabriëlle van den Broek	24	"Ciao Adios"	—	—	—	—
10	Walter de Kok	29	"Viva La Vida"	—	—	✔	—
11	Irene Dings	16	"Wings"	✔	✔	✔	✔

=== Episode 7 (December 14) ===
Order	Artist	Age	Song	Coaches' and contestants' choices			
Order	Artist	Age	Song	Lil' Kleine	Anouk	Ali B	Waylon
1	Veerle Barbé	23	"Unchain My Heart"	✔	—	—	—
2	Nate James	38	"Issues"	✔	✔	✔	✔
3	Megan Roele	22	"Big Yellow Taxi"	—	—	—	—
4	Mentissa Aziza	19	"Perfect"	✔	—	—	—
5	Mannus ter Avest	18	"Sorry"	—	✔	✔	—
6	Goldie Kedde	22	"Altijd Wel Iemand"	—	—	—	—
7	Wytse Visser	25	"Stuck in the Middle with You"	—	—	✔	—
8	Jelle Glasbergen	22	"Dancing On My Own"	✔	✔	✔	✔
9	Sharon Buitenhuis	22	"Love You More"	—	—	—	—
10	Norah Gaanderse	25	"A Woman's Worth"	✔	—	—	—
11	Kevin Storm	26	"Unknown (To You)"	✔	—	✔	✔

== The Battle Rounds ==
The non-stop steal is implemented again in this season. For this round, Anouk, Ali B, and Lil' Kleine switched chair positions to Lil' Kleine, Anouk, and Ali B, respectively.

Color key:

Artist won the Battle and advanced to the Knockout Rounds
Artist lost the Battle and was stolen by another coach, but was later switched with another artist and eliminated
Artist lost the Battle but was stolen by another coach and advanced to the Knockout Rounds
Artist lost the Battle and was eliminated

Episode	Coach	Order	Winner	Song	Loser	'Steal' result			
Episode	Coach	Order	Winner	Song	Loser	Anouk	Ali B	Lil Kleine	Waylon
Episode 8 (December 21)	Ali B	1	Sarah-Jane	"Crazy"	Kevin Storm	✔	—N/a	✔	✔
Episode 8 (December 21)	Lil Kleine	2	Kimberly Fransens	"God is a Woman"	Natascha Bessez	—	✔	—N/a	—
Episode 8 (December 21)	Anouk	3	Mannus ter Avest	"Seven Nation Army"	Ruben Anthony	—N/a	—	✔	—
Episode 8 (December 21)	Waylon	4	Sascha van den Kerckhove	"Too Good at Goodbyes"	M'lissa	✔	✔	✔	—N/a
Episode 8 (December 21)	Ali B	5	Zoë Livay	"The Middle"	Maya Shanti	✔	—N/a	—	—
Episode 8 (December 21)	Lil Kleine	6	Nika Pantovic	"Skin"	Raffie van Maren	—	—	—N/a	—
Episode 8 (December 21)	Waylon	7	Patricia van Haastrecht	"It's All Coming Back To Me Now"	Talita Blijd	—	✔	✔	—N/a
Episode 9 (December 28)	Anouk	1	Mikki Van Wijk	"One"	Lyall Silié	—N/a	—	—	—
Episode 9 (December 28)	Waylon	2	Jade PraiZe	"Blank Space"	Yentl Pool	—	✔	—	—N/a
Episode 9 (December 28)	Lil Kleine	3	Sophie Van der Stok	"When I Was Your Man"	Luigiano Paals	—	—	—N/a	—
Episode 9 (December 28)	Ali B	4	Owen Playfair	"Am I Wrong"	Olorun	—	—N/a	—	—
Episode 9 (December 28)	Anouk	5	Jelle Glasbergen	"Eenzaam Zonder Jou"	Iris Noëlle	—N/a	—	—	✔
Episode 9 (December 28)	Lil Kleine	6	Mentissa Aziza	"Stuck"	Chevelly Cooman	—	—	—N/a	—
Episode 9 (December 28)	Waylon	7	Raigny Jozephia	"Never Nooit Meer"	Xerxes Naseri	—	✔	—	—N/a
Episode 9 (December 28)	Ali B	8	Menno Aben	"What About Us"	Earl Scott	—	—N/a	—	—
Episode 10 (January 4)	Waylon	1	Luminize	"Runaway Baby"	Hard2Get	—	✔	—	—N/a
Episode 10 (January 4)	Anouk	2	Sanne Veltman	"Can't Fight the Moonlight"	Sterre Tuijl	—N/a	—	—	—
Episode 10 (January 4)	Ali B	3	Debrah Jade	"No Tears Left To Cry"	Amy Mielatz	—	—N/a	—	—
Episode 10 (January 4)	Anouk	4	Cleo Vlogman	"Attention"	Billy Maluw	—N/a	—	—	—
Episode 10 (January 4)	Lil Kleine	5	Quido Van De Graaf	"Kleine Jongen"	Ginger	—	—	—N/a	—
Episode 10 (January 4)	Lil Kleine	5	Quido Van De Graaf	"Kleine Jongen"	Mariëlle Flens	—	—	—N/a	—
Episode 10 (January 4)	Ali B	6	Evelien van Buren	"Wat Zou Je Doen"	JoHaLee	—	—N/a	—	—
Episode 10 (January 4)	Waylon	7	Bryan B	"I Knew You Were Waiting For Me"	Nate James	—	—	—	—N/a
Episode 11 (January 11)	Waylon	1	Dennis van Aarssen	"The Lady Is a Tramp"	Jackie Lou	✔	—	—	—N/a
Episode 11 (January 11)	Lil Kleine	2	Veerle Barbé	"Fighter"	Norah Gaanderse	—	—	—N/a	—
Episode 11 (January 11)	Ali B	3	Niels Hereijgers	"Youngblood"	Wytse Visser	—	—N/a	—	—
Episode 11 (January 11)	Anouk	4	Irene Dings	"You Know I'm No Good"	Jet van der Steen	—N/a	—	—	—
Episode 11 (January 11)	Lil Kleine	5	Collin Hoeve	"Hurt Somebody"	LAURA	—	—	—N/a	—
Episode 11 (January 11)	Ali B	6	Béla Becht	"Kiss From A Rose"	Walter De Kok	—	—N/a	—	—
Episode 11 (January 11)	Anouk	7	Navarone	"Respect"	Sanne de Winter	—N/a	✔	✔	✔

== The Knockouts ==
Color key
– Contestant was eliminated, either immediately (indicated by a "—" in the "Switched with" column) or switched with another contestant
– Contestant was not switched out and advanced to the Live Shows

Artists' performances
Episode	Coach	Order	Artist	Song	Result	Switched with
Episode 12 (January 18)	Anouk	1	Irene Dings	"My Immortal"	Advanced	—N/a
Episode 12 (January 18)	Anouk	2	Mannus Ter Avest	"Be Alright"	Elimiminated	—N/a
Episode 12 (January 18)	Anouk	3	Mikki Van Wijk	"Lief Zoals Je Bent"	Advanced	—N/a
Episode 12 (January 18)	Anouk	4	Sanne Veltman	"Valerie"	Eliminated	—
Episode 12 (January 18)	Anouk	5	Jelle Glasbergen	"Make It Rain"	Eliminated	Mannus Ter Avest
Episode 12 (January 18)	Anouk	6	Jackie Lou	"Proud Mary"	Eliminated	—
Episode 12 (January 18)	Anouk	7	Cleo Vlogman	"Strong"	Eliminated	—
Episode 12 (January 18)	Anouk	8	Navarone	"Chandelier"	Advanced	Jelle Glasbergen
Episode 12 (January 18)	Ali B	1	Hard2Get	"Shape of You" / "Energie"	Eliminated	—N/a
Episode 12 (January 18)	Ali B	2	Debrah Jade	"Clown"	Advanced	—N/a
Episode 12 (January 18)	Ali B	3	Niels Hereijgers	"Counting Stars"	Eliminated	—N/a
Episode 12 (January 18)	Ali B	4	Béla Becht	"Time After Time"	Eliminated	Niels Hereijgers
Episode 12 (January 18)	Ali B	5	Zoë Livay	"Verleden Tijd"	Eliminated	—
Episode 12 (January 18)	Ali B	6	Sarah-Jane	"Say Something"	Advanced	Béla Becht
Episode 12 (January 18)	Ali B	7	Owen Playfair	"Treasure"	Eliminated	—
Episode 12 (January 18)	Ali B	8	Menno Aben	"All My Friends"	Advanced	Hard2Get
Episode 12 (January 18)	Ali B	9	Evelien Van Buren	"Hero"	Eliminated	—
Episode 13 (January 25)	Lil Kleine	1	Kimberly Fransens	"Without You"	Advanced	—N/a
Episode 13 (January 25)	Lil Kleine	2	Collin Hoeve	"Butterfly"	Eliminated	—N/a
Episode 13 (January 25)	Lil Kleine	3	Talita Blijd	"Like I'm Gonna Lose You"	Advanced	—N/a
Episode 13 (January 25)	Lil Kleine	4	Veerle Barbé	"I Would Stay"	Eliminated	—
Episode 13 (January 25)	Lil Kleine	5	Nika Pantovic	"Shotgun"	Eliminated	Collin Hoeve
Episode 13 (January 25)	Lil Kleine	6	Mentissa Aziza	"Beneath Your Beautiful"	Eliminated	—
Episode 13 (January 25)	Lil Kleine	7	Sophie Van Der Stok	"Let's Hear It for the Boy"	Eliminated	—
Episode 13 (January 25)	Lil Kleine	8	Quido Van De Graaf	"Het Is Over"	Advanced	Nika Pantovic
Episode 13 (January 25)	Waylon	1	Luminize	"Hotter than Hell"	Eliminated	—N/a
Episode 13 (January 25)	Waylon	2	Sascha Van Der Kerckhove	"Altijd Wel Iemand"	Eliminated	—N/a
Episode 13 (January 25)	Waylon	3	Dennis Van Aarsen	"Mr. Bojangles"	Advanced	—N/a
Episode 13 (January 25)	Waylon	4	Jade PraiZe	"In My Blood"	Eliminated	—
Episode 13 (January 25)	Waylon	5	Sanne De Winter	"Leave the Light On"	Eliminated	Sascha Van Den Kerckhove
Episode 13 (January 25)	Waylon	6	Raigny Jozephia	"Liever Dan Lief"	Eliminated	Luminize
Episode 13 (January 25)	Waylon	7	Patricia Van Haastrecht	"Bleeding Love"	Advanced	Raigny Jozephia
Episode 13 (January 25)	Waylon	8	Bryan B	"Wake Me Up!"	Advanced	Sanne De Winter

== The Live Shows ==
Color key
– Artist had one of the six lowest scores and was eliminated
– Artist's score was among the top six, advancing them to the next Live round
– Artist was voted through by the public vote after having one of the lowest scores

=== Week 1: Top 12 (February 1) ===
Order	Coach	Artist	Song	Coaches' scores					Public vote score	Total score	Result
Order	Coach	Artist	Song	Anouk	Ali B	Lil Kleine	Waylon	Average score	Public vote score	Total score	Result
1	Ali B	Menno Aben	"It Will Rain"	8.0	7.5	7.0	7.5	7.50	6.69	14.19	Advanced
2	Waylon	Bryan B	"Relight My Fire"	7.5	7.0	7.0	7.5	7.25	6.24	13.49	Eliminated
3	Anouk	Irene Dings	"Another Love"	7.5	7.0	8.0	8.0	7.63	6.39	14.02	Advanced
4	Lil Kleine	Talita Blijd	"Like I Can"	6.5	7.5	8.0	8.0	7.50	6.66	14.16	Eliminated
5	Waylon	Dennis Van Aarsen	"Lost"	8.0	8.0	8.0	8.5	8.13	8.64	16.77	Advanced
6	Ali B	Debrah Jade	"Say My Name"	8.5	8.5	7.0	8.5	8.13	5.67	13.80	Eliminated
7	Lil Kleine	Quido Van De Graaf	"Ik Meen 'T"	8.5	7.0	10.0	7.5	8.25	8.02	16.27	Advanced
8	Anouk	Navarone	"Somebody To Love"	9.0	9.0	8.5	8.0	8.63	8.51	17.14	Advanced
9	Lil Kleine	Kimberly Fransens	"Afscheid"	9.0	8.0	8.5	9.0	8.63	8.26	16.89	Advanced
10	Anouk	Mikki Van Wijk	"I Kissed A Girl"	8.0	7.5	7.0	8.5	7.75	7.03	14.78	Advanced
11	Ali B	Sarah-Jane	"Don't Let Go (Love)"	8.5	9.5	8.5	7.5	8.50	8.34	16.84	Advanced
12	Waylon	Patricia Van Haastrecht	"This Is Me"	8.0	10.0	8.5	10.0	9.13	8.93	18.06	Advanced

Non-competition performances
Order	Performer	Song
1	Little Mix, Debrah Jade & Kimberly	"Woman Like Me"
2	Little Mix	"Think About Us"
3	Sanne De Winter	"I'll Never Love Again"

=== Week 2: Top 9 (February 8) ===
Order	Coach	Artist	Song	Coaches' scores					Public vote score	Total score	Result
Order	Coach	Artist	Song	Anouk	Ali B	Lil Kleine	Waylon	Average score	Public vote score	Total score	Result
1	Ali B	Sarah Jane	"Say My Name"	7.5	9.0	9.0	8.0	8.38	6.67	15.05	Eliminated
2	Anouk	Mikki Van Wijk	"Als Ze Er Niet Is"	8.5	7.5	8.0	9.0	8.25	7.24	15.49	Advanced
3	Waylon	Dennis Van Aarsen	"Modern World"	8.5	9.0	10.0	9.0	9.13	9.03	18.16	Advanced
4	Anouk	Irene Dings	"Don't Leave Me Alone"	8.5	7.0	8.5	9.0	8.25	6.83	15.08	Eliminated
5	Lil Kleine	Quido Van De Graaf	"Waarom Nou Jij"	7.0	8.5	10.0	8.5	8.50	7.19	15.69	Advanced
6	Anouk	Navarone	"I Still Haven't Found What I'm Looking For"	8.5	9.0	8.0	10.0	8.88	8.99	17.87	Advanced
7	Waylon	Patricia Van Haastrecht	"Sorry"	8.5	9.0	10.0	10.0	9.38	8.61	17.99	Advanced
8	Ali B	Menno Aben	"In My Blood"	7.0	8.5	8.0	8.5	8.00	7.51	15.51	Advanced
9	Lil Kleine	Kimberly Fransens	"Kon Ik Maar Even Bij Je Zijn"	8.0	8.0	9.0	8.0	8.25	7.06	15.31	Eliminated

Non-competition performances
Order	Performer	Song
1	Tom Walker, Menno And Merijn	"Leave a Light On"
2	Maan, Tabitha, Bizzey and KKA	"Hij Is Van Mij"

=== Week 3: Semi-Final - Top 6 (February 15) ===
Just like previous seasons, this week, after all six artists have performed their first songs, one was eliminated based on the ongoing public vote. A second artist was then eliminated after the top 5's second performances regardless of their teams, leaving four artists advanced to the finale. With the elimination of Quido, Lil Kleine had no more acts left on his team to compete.

Order	Coach	Artist	1st Song	Result	Order	2nd Song	Result
1	Waylon	Dennis van Aarssen	"New York, New York"	Public's Vote	9	"She"	Public's Vote
2	Anouk	Mikki van Wijk	"Be The One"	Public's Vote	7	"Omarm Me"	Eliminated
3	Ali B	Menno Aben	"I Don't Want to Miss a Thing"	Public's Vote	8	"Story of My Life"	Public's Vote
4	Anouk	Navarone	"Beat It"	Public's Vote	10	"Iris"	Public's Vote
5	Lil Kleine	Quido van de Graaf	"Uit M'n Bol"	Eliminated	N/A (Already eliminated)		
6	Waylon	Patricia van Haastrecht	"If I Could Turn Back Time"	Public's Vote	11	"Titanium"	Public's Vote

=== Week 4: Final (February 22) ===
Coach	Artist	Order	Reprise song	Order	Duet song	Order	Single	Result
Ali B	Menno Aben	1	"Make It Rain"	8	"Before I Go" (with Guy Sebastian)	N/A (Already Eliminated)		Fourth Place
Waylon	Dennis Van Aarssen	7	"That's Life"	2	"You Give Me Something" (with James Morrison)	10	"Modern World"	Winner
Anouk	Navarone	3	"Whole Lotta Love"	6	"Master Blaster (Jammin')" (with Shirma Rouse)	9	"Perfect Design" (Original Song)	Runner-up
Waylon	Patricia van Haastrecht	5	"Rise Up"	4	"Shallow" (with Waylon)	11	"I Will Go" (Original Song)	Third Place

Non-competition performances
Order	Performer	Song
1	The Top 4	"Freedom! '90"
2	Ava Max	"Sweet but Psycho"

== Elimination Chart ==
=== Overall ===
Color key
Artist's info

- Artist from Team Anouk
- Artist from Team Ali B
- Artist from Team Lil Kleine
- Artist from Team Waylon

Result details

- Winner
- Runner-up
- Third place
- Fourth place
- Artist had the highest combined score of the week
- Artist was either saved by the public vote or by the total score
- Artist was eliminated

Live show results per week
Artist	Week 1	Week 2	Week 3		Finals
Artist	Week 1	Week 2	Round 1	Round 2	Finals
Dennis Van Aarsen	Safe	Safe	Safe	Safe	Winner
Navarone	Safe	Safe	Safe	Safe	Runner-up
Patricia Van Haastrecht	Safe	Safe	Safe	Safe	3rd Place
Menno Aben	Safe	Safe	Safe	Safe	4th Place
Mikki van Wijk	Safe	Safe	Safe	Eliminated	
Quido van de Graaf	Safe	Safe	Eliminated		
Kimberly Fransens	Safe	Eliminated			
Irene Dings	Safe	Eliminated			
Sarah-Jane	Safe	Eliminated			
Debrah Jade	Eliminated				
Talita Blijd	Eliminated				
Bryan B	Eliminated				

=== Team ===
Color key
Artist's info

- Artist from Team Anouk
- Artist from Team Ali B
- Artist from Team Lil Kleine
- Artist from Team Waylon

Result details

- Winner
- Runner-up
- Third place
- Fourth place
- Artist had the highest combined score of the week
- Artist was eliminated

Live show results per week
Artist	Week 1	Week 2	Week 3		Finals
Artist	Week 1	Week 2	Round 1	Round 2	Finals
Navarone	Advanced	Advanced	Advanced	Advanced	Runner-up
Mikki van Wijk	Advanced	Advanced	Advanced	Eliminated	
Irene Dings	Advanced	Eliminated			
Menno Aben	Advanced	Advanced	Advanced	Advanced	Fourth Place
Sarah-Jane	Advanced	Eliminated			
Debrah Jade	Eliminated				
Quido van de Graaf	Advanced	Advanced	Eliminated		
Kimberly Fransens	Advanced	Eliminated			
Talita Blijd	Eliminated				
Dennis Van Aarsen	Advanced	Advanced	Advanced	Advanced	Winner
Patricia Van Haastrecht	Advanced	Advanced	Advanced	Advanced	Third Place
Bryan B	Eliminated				

== Artists' appearances in other media ==
- Chevelly Cooman auditioned for The voice of Holland season 8, but no chairs turned.
- Sanne Veltman participated in the sixth season of The Voice Kids. She made it until the Sing-Off round.
- Quido van de Graaf was a contestant of Bloed, Zweet en Tranen.
- Sascha van den Kerckhove was a contestant of Dutch Idols season 5.
- Amy Mielatz was a contestant of Dutch Idols season 6.
- Kimberly Fransens auditioned for The voice of Holland season 2. She became a member of team Angela Groothuizen and she was eliminated in The Battle Rounds. She also participated in the fifth season of Dutch Idols and she finished runner-up.
- Nathalie Blue auditioned for the eighth season of Holland's Got Talent.
- Billy Maluw participated in The voice of Holland season 1. He became a member of team Nick & Simon and he was eliminated in The Battle Rounds.
- Niels Hereijgers auditioned for The voice of Holland season 8, but no chairs turned.
- Bryan B auditioned for The voice of Holland season 2, but no chairs turned. He also participated in Dutch TV series 'The Winner Is' and he won the show.
- Jamal Bijnoe, part of Olorun, placed third in Dutch X Factor season 2.
- Raffie van Maren auditioned for the first season of The Voice Kids, but no chairs turned.
- Luigiano Paals was a contestant in Dutch X Factor season 2 and British X Factor season 8.
- Irene Dings participated in the second season of The Voice Kids as part of team Nick & Simon and finished runner-up.
- Nate James participated in The Voice UK season 2, where he became part of team Jessie J. He was eliminated during The Battle Rounds.
- Mentissa Aziza was announced the winner of Belgian Flemish version of The Voice Kids season one.
- Mannus ter Avest participated twice in The Voice Kids: in the first season in 2012 and in the fifth season in 2015. In both seasons, he was eliminated during The Battle Rounds.
- Wytse Visser participated in De beste singer-songwriter van Nederland season 3. He also participated in Belgian TV programme The Band, where he reached the final round.

== Ratings ==
Episode	Airdate	Total	Total with late watching
The Blind Auditions 1	November 2, 2018	1.946.000	2.319.000
The Blind Auditions 2	November 9, 2018	2.003.000	2.348.000
The Blind Auditions 3	November 16, 2018	1.660.000	1.951.000
The Blind Auditions 4	November 23, 2018	1.781.000	2.108.000
The Blind Auditions 5	November 30, 2018	1.972.000	2.289.000
The Blind Auditions 6	December 7, 2018	2.012.000	2.268.000
The Blind Auditions 7	December 14, 2018	1.744.000	1.958.000
The Battles 1	December 21, 2018	1.599.000	1.854.000
The Battles 2	December 28, 2018	1.719.000	1.964.000
The Battles 3	January 4, 2019	2.006.000	2.253.000
The Battles 4	January 11, 2019	2.020.000	2.286.000
The Knockouts 1	January 18, 2019	1.789.000	2.071.000
The Knockouts 2	January 25, 2019	2.010.000	2.183.000
Top 12	February 1, 2019	1.986.000	2.255.000
Top 9	February 8, 2019	2.031.000	2.254.000
Semifinals	February 15, 2019	1.620.000	
Finals	February 22, 2019	2.213.000	
