= Sophia Kruithof =

Dutch singer-songwriter

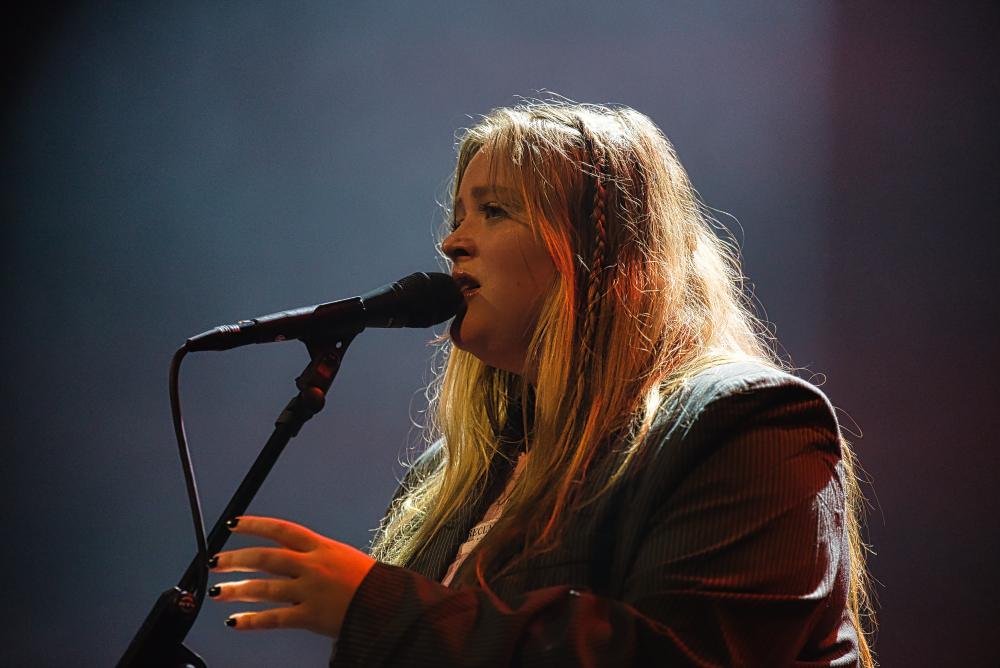
- Kruithof in 2023

Background information
- Born: 6 May 2002 (age 23); Netherlands
- Occupation: singer-songwriter
- Instruments: Vocals, guitar
- Years active: 2020–present
- Labels: 8ball Music

Sophia Kruithof (born 6 May 2002) is a Dutch singer-songwriter who won the 10th season of the Voice of Holland. During the finals she presented her self-written first single "Alaska".

Kruithof was one of the five finalists in the Dutch internal selection for the Eurovision Song Contest 2024, where Joost Klein was ultimately chosen.

== Discography ==
=== Singles ===
- "Alaska" (2020)
- "Where Everybody Knows Your Name" (2020)

Awards and achievements
Preceded by Dennis van Aarssen	Winner of The Voice of Holland; Season ten (2019–2020)	Succeeded by Dani van Velthoven
