= Veronica Roth =

American author (born 1988)

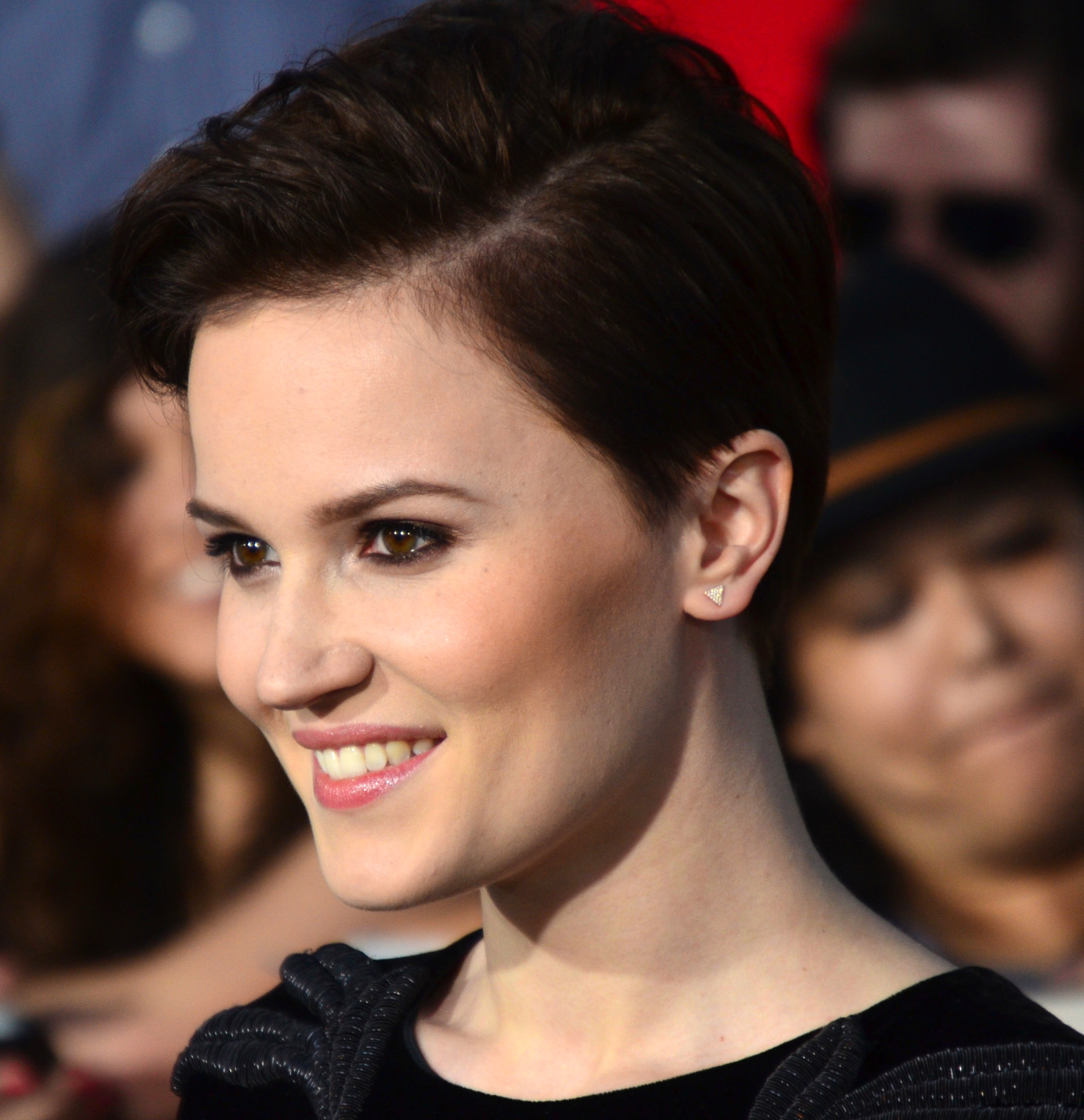
- Roth at the film premiere of Divergent in California on March 18, 2014
- Born: Veronica Anne Roth; August 19, 1988 (age 38); New York City, New York, U.S.
- Education: Northwestern University (2010)
- Occupations: Novelist, short story writer
- Spouse: Nelson Fitch (m. 2011)
- Writing career
- Period: 2011–present
- Genres: Young adult, dystopian fantasy, adventure
- Notable work: Divergent trilogy
- Website: www.veronicarothbooks.com

Signature
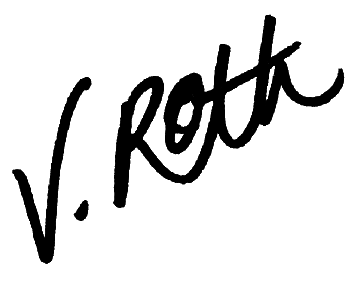

Veronica Anne Roth (born August 19, 1988) is an American novelist and short story writer, known for her bestselling Divergent trilogy which has sold more than 35 million copies worldwide.

== Personal and early life ==
Veronica Roth was born on August 19, 1988, in New York City, and was raised primarily in Barrington, Illinois. Her mother, Barbara Ross, is a painter who resides in Barrington. She is the youngest of three children. Her parents divorced when she was five years old, and her mother remarried to Frank Ross, a financial consultant for landscaping companies. Her brother and sister live in the Chicago area.

Roth is of German and Polish descent. She says of her father: "He had a job, and worked far away. Now I have a good relationship with my stepdad." Her maternal grandparents were concentration camp survivors, whose religious convictions pushed her mother away from religion. Roth learned about Christianity by attending a Christian Bible study during her high school years, and has since stayed with it.

Roth went to Grove Avenue Elementary School, Barrington Middle School (Prairie Campus), and Barrington High School. After one year at Carleton College, she transferred to Northwestern University for its creative writing program.

Roth married photographer Nelson Fitch in 2011. They reside in the Chicago area.

== Career ==
Roth wrote her first book, Divergent, while on winter break in her senior year at Northwestern University, and found an agent by the following March. Her career took off rapidly with the novel's success; the publishing rights sold before she graduated from college in 2010 and the film rights sold mid-March 2011, before the novel was printed in April 2011. Her first two novels sold over five million copies worldwide by fall 2013, just as the film based on the first novel was wrapping up.

Roth sold the film rights to The Divergent Series to Summit Entertainment. The filming of Divergent, the adaptation of the first book in the series, started in April 2013, and the film was released in March 2014. On March 21, 2014, Lionsgate officially greenlit the film adaptation of Insurgent. The film was released on March 20, 2015. On April 11, 2014, Summit Entertainment announced that the third book, Allegiant, would be split into two films, part 1 and part 2. Former Part 1 is called The Divergent Series: Allegiant, and was released on March 18, 2016, and former Part 2 is named The Divergent Series: Ascendant, and was scheduled to be released on March 24, 2017. The theatrical release for Ascendant was canceled in favor of it being a television film and spinoff series. The television film and spinoff series were later canceled.

Roth has written four short stories from character Tobias Eaton's point of view. "The Transfer" is the first. It recounts some of Tobias's life before Divergent. It was released on September 3, 2013. The second story is "The Initiate". The stories are sold separately as e-books and also bound together under the title Four: A Divergent Story Collection. The last of Tobias's stories are "The Son" and "The Traitor". The story collection was published in several forms in July 2014. The novella Free Four: Tobias Tells the Story is chapter 13 of Divergent from Tobias's point of view, and was released for Kindle in 2012 in the U.S. and in 2013 in the UK.

HarperCollins announced a two-book deal with Roth for publication of two young adult novels. The first book, Carve the Mark, was published on January 17, 2017 and the sequel, The Fates Divide, was released on April 10, 2018. An epilogue to Divergent, We Can Be Mended, was announced in December 2016. It could either be purchased independently or included as an extra with a Carve the Mark pre-order.

In October 2018, HarperCollins announced another two-book deal with Roth. The first is a collection of short stories titled The End and Other Beginnings that take place in a future with advanced technology. One of the stories in the collection, "Inertia", has been optioned for film adaptation by Fox 2000 Pictures.

John Joseph Adams Books acquired Roth's book Chosen Ones for publication on April 6, 2020. She later published the novels Poster Girl in 2022 and Arch-Conspirator in 2023, as well as the novellas When Among Crows and To Clutch a Razor in 2024 and 2025, respectively. In May 2026, she will release Seek the Traitor's Son, the first in an adult dystopian duology.

In April 2026, Roth announced at BookCon that she would return to the Divergent series with a new duology. The first book in this series, The Sixth Faction, will be published on October 6, 2026. At BookCon, Roth explained that The Sixth Faction is not a prequel, sequel, or spin-off but an alternate-universe reimagining of Divergent in which protagonist Tris Prior did not transfer to the Dauntless faction.

In an interview with Elle Magazine, Roth explained that she wanted to return to the world of Divergent in order to resolve her "negative feelings" around the series and the criticism it received. “In many ways, [The Sixth Faction] is the culmination of all the work I’ve done, not just on myself, but on my writing," she told Elle. "I put everything I learned into this.”

Roth will publish the sequel to The Sixth Faction on Feb. 2, 2027.

== Awards ==
- 2011 Goodreads Favorite Book for Divergent
- 2011 Goodreads Choice Award in Best Young Adult Fantasy (& Science Fiction) for Divergent
- 2012 Best Goodreads Author for Insurgent
- 2012 Goodreads Choice Award in Best Young Adult Fantasy (& Science Fiction) for Insurgent
- 2013 Goodreads Choice Award in Best Young Adult Fantasy (& Science Fiction) for Allegiant

== Works ==
=== The Divergent Series Trilogy ===
  - Divergent (2011)
  - Insurgent (2012)
  - Allegiant (2013)

==== Other Divergent related publications ====
  - "Free Four" (short story) (2012)
  - The World of Divergent: The Path to Allegiant (2013)
  - Four: A Divergent Collection (2014), serves as prequel to the trilogy
  - "We Can Be Mended" (short story) (2017)

=== The Sixth Faction Duology ===
- The Sixth Faction (2026)
- The Last Testimony (2027)

=== The Shards and Ashes anthology ===
  - "Hearken" (2013), a short story

=== The Carve the Mark duology ===
  - Carve the Mark (2017)
  - The Fates Divide (2018)

=== Curse Bearer series ===
- When Among Crows (2024)
- To Clutch a Razor (2025)

=== The Burning Empire series ===
- Seek the Traitor’s Son (2026)
- Curse the Left Hand (2027)

=== Standalone works ===
- The End and Other Beginnings: Stories from the Future (2019)
- Ark (2019)
- Chosen Ones (2020)
- Poster Girl (2022)
- Arch-Conspirator (2023)
- Void (2023)
