= The End and Other Beginnings =

- The cover art of The End and Other Beginnings
- Author: Veronica Roth
- Language: English
- Genre: Science fiction, short stories, young adult literature
- Publisher: HarperCollins
- Publication date: October 1, 2019
- Publication place: United States
- Media type: Print (hardcover), e-book
- Pages: 272
- ISBN: 978-0062796523

The End and Other Beginnings is a collection of science fiction short stories for young adults by Veronica Roth. The short stories include a tale of friendship and revenge, plus two of the stories are new additions to the Carve the Mark universe.

== Contents ==
The six stories are:

- Inertia
- The Spinners
- Hearken (previously published in an anthology, as were two others)
- Vim and Vigor
- Armored Ones (set in the Carve the Mark universe)
- The Transformationist (set in the Carve the Mark universe, on a new planet with new characters)

== Development of the book ==
On October 4, 2018, HarperCollins announced a two-book deal with Roth.

In an interview, Roth talked about how her writing has changed: "my process is different now, because I'm learning from each book. I do a lot more planning now, a lot more outlining, a lot more research. I know what questions to ask myself before I start. That's the thing about writing—you can learn a lot from reading, a lot from critique, but you learn the most from actually doing it."

== Reception ==
One reviewer stated, "Though they're all worlds that feel ripe for more storytelling and diving into, each novella has a complete arc."
