= Baby Love (disambiguation) =

"Baby Love" is a 1964 song recorded by the Supremes.

Baby Love may also refer to:

== Films ==
- Baby Love (1968 film), a 1968 film starring Linda Hayden, Ann Lynn, Keith Barron and Diana Dors
- Baby Love (1984 film), the fourth sequel to Lemon Popsicle, produced by Menahem Golan and Yoram Globus
- Baby Love (1995 film), a Philippine film directed by Peque Gallaga
- Baby Love (2008 film), French film

== Music ==
- "Baby Love", released in 1977 by Mother's Finest
- "Baby Love" (Regina song), a 1986 song by Regina, notably covered by Dannii Minogue in 1991
- "Baby Love", a song by Joan Osborne from her 2000 album Righteous Love
- "Baby Love", a song by Stephanie Mills from her 2004 album Born for This!
- "Baby Love/Yakusoku", a 2006 maxi-single, the soundtrack from the anime Kyo no Gononi
- Baby Love (album), a 2007 album by Humming Urban Stereo.
- "Baby Love" (Nicole Scherzinger song), a 2007 song by Nicole Scherzinger

== Other ==
- Baby Love (1981), the first novel by Joyce Maynard
- Baby Love (manga), a 1996–1999 manga by Ayumi Shiina
- Baby Love: Choosing Motherhood After a Lifetime of Ambivalence, a 2007 memoir by Rebecca Walker
- Walt "Baby" Love, radio personality and minister
- Baby Love, lead singer and rapper of Rock Steady Crew
- Walter Afanasieff a.k.a. "Baby Love", Russian-American songwriter and producer
- Baby Love, a 2022 young adult novel by Jacqueline Wilson
- "Baby Love" (The Apprentice), a 2009 television episode
