= The Guns of Navarone =

The Guns of Navarone or Navarone may refer to:

- The Guns of Navarone (novel), 1957 World War II-set novel by Alistair MacLean
- The Guns of Navarone (film), 1961 film based on MacLean's novel
- Guns of Navarone (song), film's theme song, covered by Jamaican ska group The Skatalites in 1965 and later covered by The Specials
- The Guns of Navarone (Behind Enemy Lines), an adventure for the role-playing game Behind Enemy Lines
- Navarone (video game), Japanese arcade video game released by Namco in 1980, loosely inspired by 1961 and 1978 films
- Navarone (band), Dutch rock band formed in 2008
- "Guns of Navarone", a 2021 song by Sean Paul

== People ==
- Navarone Foor (born 1992), Dutch professional footballer
- Navarone Garibaldi (born 1987), American musician

== See also ==
- Force 10 from Navarone (novel), 1968 novel by Alistair MacLean, sequel to The Guns of Navarone
- Force 10 from Navarone (film), released in 1978 and loosely based on MacLean's 1968 novel
- Navarrone, American historical novel by Helen R. Myers; winner of 1993 RITA Award#Contemporary Romance
