= Vim =

Vim may refer to:

== Arts and entertainment ==
- "Vim", a song by Machine Head on the album Through the Ashes of Empires

== Science and technology ==
- International vocabulary of metrology (VIM, for the French Vocabulaire international de métrologie)
- Verona integron-encoded metallo-β-lactamase (VIM), a type of Beta-lactamase enzyme
- Ventral intermediate nucleus (VIM), a precise area of the isothalamus, one of the brain's movement centers
- VIM gene, encodes Vimentin protein

== Computing ==
- Vendor Independent Messaging (VIM), an email API
- Virtualized Infrastructure Manager (VIM), a component of NFV-MANO network
- Vim (text editor)
- VIM-1, a single board computer

== Aviation and space ==
- Vickers VIM, an aircraft
- VIM Airlines, a former Russian airline
- Voyager Interstellar Mission (VIM), a space mission

== Organizations ==
- Vim (cleaning product)
- Vim Comedy Company, a movie studio
- Vim Records
