= Baby Love (novel) =

2022 novel by Jacqueline Wilson

- Author: Jacqueline Wilson
- Illustrator: Rachael Dean
- Language: English
- Genre: Children's novel and Young adult literature
- Publisher: Penguin Books
- Publication date: 17 March 2022
- Publication place: United Kingdom
- Media type: Print (hardback, Ebook & paperback) and audiobook
- Pages: 496
- ISBN: 978-0241567128

Baby Love is a 2022 young adult and children's novel, written by English novelist Jacqueline Wilson and illustrated by Rachael Dean. It was published by Penguin Books and originally released in hardcover in March 2022, with a paperback version being released the following year. Baby Love was aimed at readers older than the majority of Wilson's other novels and covers themes including teenage pregnancy, sex and sexual consent. The novel is set in the early 1960s and follows the 14-year-old Laura, who becomes pregnant after being sexually assaulted and is sent away to a Mother and Baby Home. Wilson drew on her own experiences of living in a girls' hostel in Scotland when she was 16. Baby Love received mostly positive reviews from critics, who praised Wilson's writing and her depiction of attitudes towards pregnant girls in the 1960s.

== Plot ==
In 1959, 14-year-old Laura lives with her parents, who have financial difficulties, and she has gained a scholarship to go to school. Laura loves her parents but feels unable to talk to them about many things and has lived a sheltered life. Nina, Laura's classmate, becomes friends with her and Laura begins loving spending time at Nina's house with Nina's family, which begins to cause conflict with Laura's own parents due to Laura's jealousy over Nina's family. When visiting a lido nearby, Nina and Laura pretend they are 16 when they meet two French older teenagers. Laura goes home with one of the men, 17-year-old Léon, who she likes, but he ends up raping her, and the lack of sex education she has received makes Laura unprepared for how to navigate what has happened. Laura is ashamed of this and then finds out she is pregnant, which she hides from her parents. Laura goes on holiday with her parents, where they encounter Suzanna, Laura's estranged maternal aunt. Laura's parents are outraged when they find out that she is pregnant, and she is sent away to Heathcote House, a Mother and Baby Home. Laura meets other girls who are pregnant, including Sarah, who was groomed by her teacher. Miss Andrews tries to force the girls into putting their babies up for adoption, but Laura is able to keep hers due to the help of Suzanna.

== Production ==
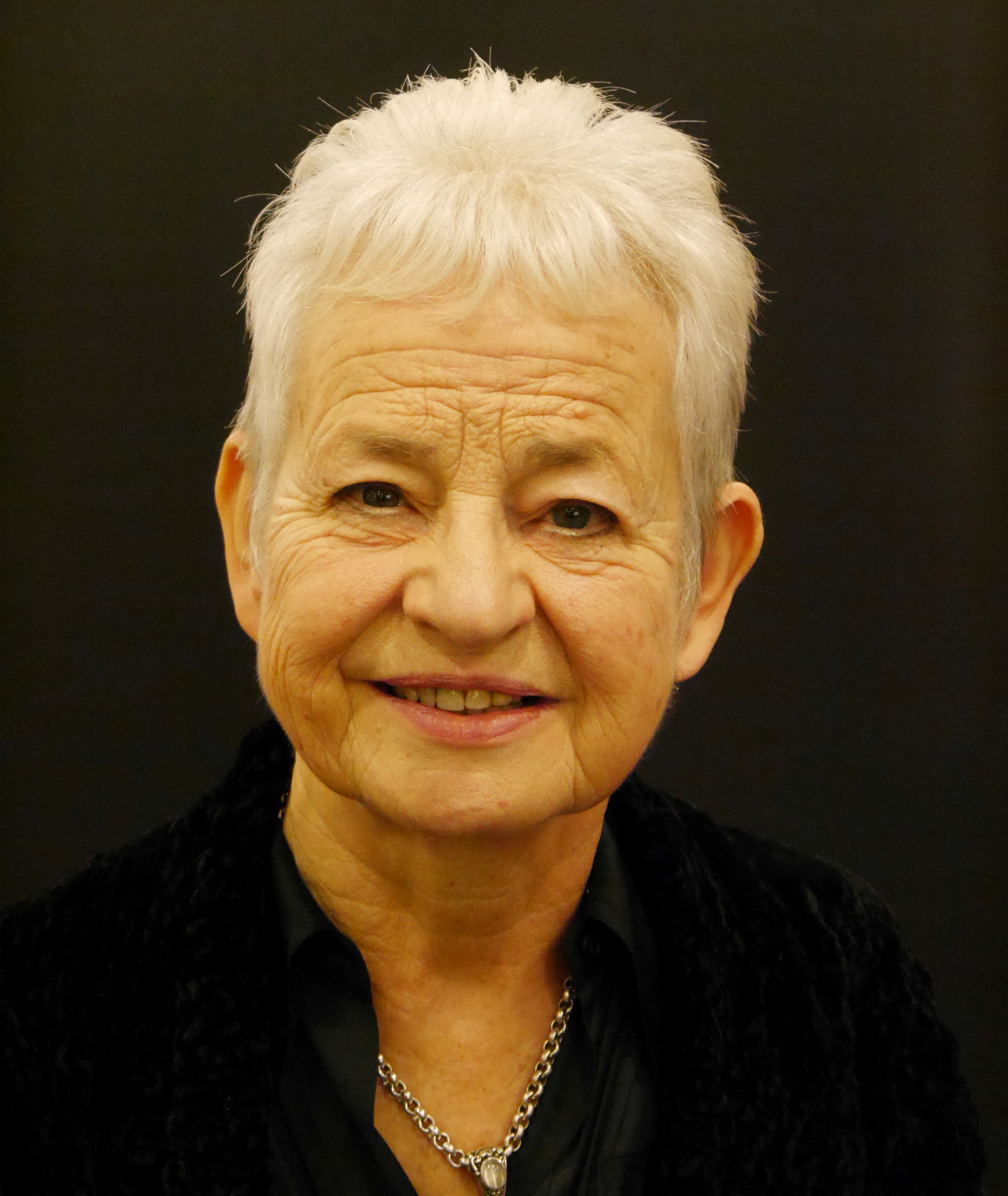
Baby Love is Jacqueline Wilson's 114th book.

Baby Love was written by Jacqueline Wilson and illustrated by Rachael Dean. The novel was announced in November 2021, when it was announced that Penguin Random House had signed Baby Love, which was deemed to be a "heartbreaking" young adult novel about teenage pregnancy, friendship and family. It was originally released in hardcover on 17 March 2022. A paperback version of the novel was released on 2 February 2023. Baby Love is the 114th novel that Wilson has written and is set in 1959 and the beginning of the 1960s. It is aimed at children aged 12 and over, which is older than Wilson's typical target demographic. The book's description says that it is unsuitable for younger readers and recommends it for fans of the novels Dear Nobody and Juno.

Baby Love covers themes such as teenage pregnancy, sex and sexual consent, and details the process of giving birth. The end of the book is followed by notes from the charities Schools Consent Project and Adoption UK for readers affected by the story. After leaving school at 16, Wilson moved to Dundee to write for the magazine Jackie and lived at Church of Scotland girls' hostel, which she decided would be the "perfect setting" for the Mother and Baby Home in Baby Love. Wilson spoke about the stigma of unmarried mothers becoming pregnant and being sent to Mother and Baby Homes in the 1960s, explaining, "There was such shame, and loving families would send their daughters away to these homes to have their babies so no-one would know ... Even then it just seemed dreadful and now looking back it seems almost barbaric." She noted how girls would be encouraged to never speak about the experience again after giving up their children again. The novel covered "difficult" topics, such as the beginning of the novel revealing that the narrator's two siblings died shortly after being born; Wilson was known for including difficult subjects in her previous novels as well, but said there were limits to what she would include and that she would be extremely cautious of including very violent or sexually explicit scenes.

== Reception ==
Baby Love was The Times' "Children's Book of the Week", with the reviewer Alex O'Connell noting he was "gripped" by the novel. Rosa Silverman from The Daily Telegraph noted that the idea of an unmarried pregnant woman being sent to a mother and baby home like the one in Baby Love would "strike modern young readers as cruel and strange". Baby Love was nominated for the Historical Association's "The Young Quills Awards for best historical fiction for young people" in the Young Adult (14+) category, and three young reviewers from the association all praised the novel and recommended it, although one thought that the book's pacing was too slow and required "another turn of events" to be "page-turning". All three readers found the novel to be emotional, and two noted how the plot taught them about how young pregnant women were treated in the 1960s.

Gemma E McLaughlin from The National praised Baby Love, writing that Wilson "is the kind of author you can come back to after years and be drawn in once again by each story". She praised the way that the 1960s setting was portrayed in a way that made it "easy to become immersed" in the narrator's world, and added that the way she was written "shows that many of the experiences of being a 14-year-old girl remain the same no matter the time period." McLaughlin explained, "Part of what makes this so compelling is that it is not all big moments for the plot and you truly grow to care about the main character through the more every-day moments of life dealing with family, friends and growing up." The reviewer also praised the importance of representing stories about consent and pregnancy options as she believed that conversations on those topics are "vital" despite attitudes being better towards them than they were in the novel's time setting. She added, "Wilson is a writer who will always stand out for her ability to discuss the sensitive topics young people need to hear about with warmth, understanding and honesty". She also called Laura's parents "loving but rarely open".

Rebecca Butler from Books for Keeps rated the book five stars and noted that the novel "depicts with clarity the distress of young mothers deprived of the chance to keep their babies, and the wall of social condemnation confronting these women. Once Laura becomes pregnant, society decides that she has deprived herself of every civil right." Butler believed that out of all the "varied" themes that Wilson had covered across her works, "none goes so directly to the heart of a corrupt and merciless society in the recent past", and believed that more traces of that prejudice exist in today's world than "we think". Butler added, "Given Wilson's immense talent to amuse, she deserves great credit for undertaking this much more sombre task." She also noted, "Of course once the pregnancy is known no more is heard of Léon". Furthermore, Butler called Laura's pregnancy a "deadly secret" and believed that Suzanna played a significant role in the novel.

Author Holly Bourne called Baby Love "heartbreaking but warm, unflinching yet somehow cosy", commenting that no one writes like Wilson and that she could not get the characters out of her mind; she added, "Wilson understands the complex interpersonal relationships of teenagers so well and writes with an unparalleled realness and rawness". Emily Whitehouse from Buzz Magazine believed that Baby Love could be the "toughest" of Wilson's novels to read, calling it an "an original piece whose characters will stick with you for a long time". Whitehouse called it a "well-paced, emotional and intermittently heartwarming journey" that taught the values of friendship, family, consent and sex education, and commented that the brief illustrations that appear at the beginning of the chapters remind readers that Laura is a teenager as "Laura's advanced literacy enables readers to forget her youth". She added, "Laura's defining quality is her love of literature: she mostly reads classics that have been left on her dad's coach, mirroring her reality. She's a unique girl with huge potential but is cast away to keep a secret."
