= Dennis van Aarssen =

Dutch singer (born 1994)

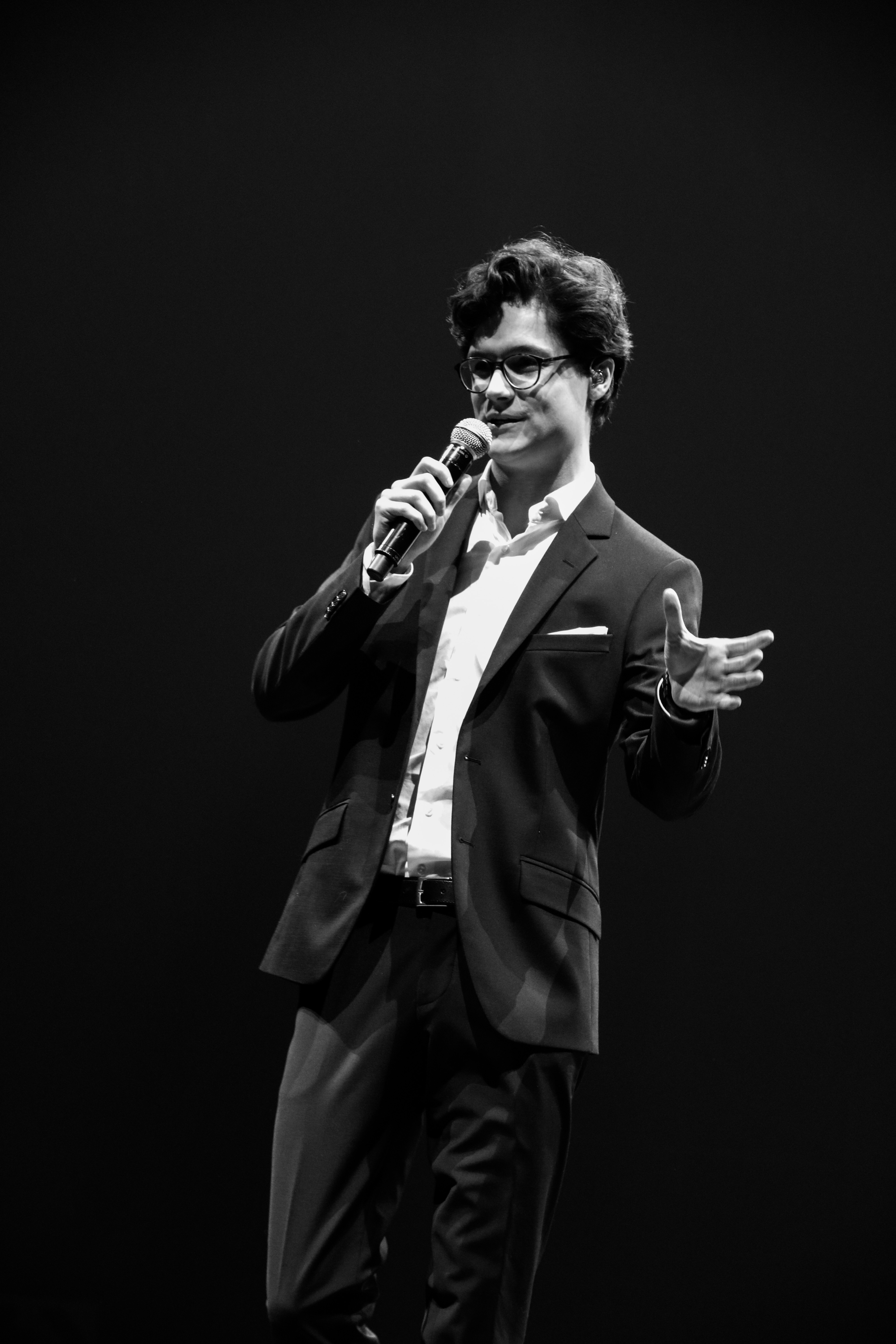
- Dennis van Aarssen during the VEED Awards in Amsterdam.

Background information
- Born: 2 June 1994 (age 32); Netherlands
- Genre: Jazz
- Occupation: Singer
- Instrument: Vocals
- Years active: 2018–present
- Label: 8ball Music
- Website: https://www.dennisvanaarssen.com

Dennis van Aarssen (born 2 June 1994) is a Dutch singer who won the 9th season of the Voice of Holland.

== Life and career ==
Dennis van Aarssen was born in The Netherlands. He developed a passion for swing and jazz and cited Robbie Williams’ album Swing When You’re Winning, which he first heard as a seven-year-old, as his early inspiration. Prior to entering The Voice of Holland, van Aarssen had a YouTube channel where he showcased his renditions of songs by Frank Sinatra, Sammy Davis Jr., and Michael Bublé, among others.

With a debut album that resulted in a gold record, a theater tour with 31 shows and 20,000 tickets sold, and an Edison Award, 'crooner' Dennis van Aarssen had the proverbial wind at his back. In March 2020, as a result of the COVID-19 pandemic, his trip to New York, the release of the deluxe version of his debut album was postponed, and performances at festivals were all cancelled. His autumn tour 'That's Life', a reprise of the successful first theater tour, was also postponed.

Van Aarssen began streaming 30-minute performances from the studio once a week for sixteen weeks. Jazzy swing, always with tracks from his favorite singers like Frank Sinatra. He also streamed two performances in Afas Live.

Over the pandemic, van Aarssen began writing original songs with René van Mierlo, guitarists Diggy Dex and Stef Bos, and producer Marcel Tegelaar, known for his work with Guus Meeuwis and Diggy Dex, among others. "In the summer of 2020 I had already taken a trip with the track 'Meet Me In Miami', produced by Marcel. I immediately clicked with René and Marcel and we started working on new material in April of this year. That new work was less suited to the big band genre, but I thought it was great. The final result is a summery EP with five electro swing tracks.”

In early 2020, van Aarssen began working on his second studio album How To Live over Zoom with Jeff Franzel, former pianist and songwriter of Frank Sinatra, and Maria Christensen, lyricist who wrote for Céline Dion and Jennifer Lopez. Dennis had already worked with this duo for his debut album. Eight new songs emerged from that session, four of which appear on the new album. In addition to two covers (Death of a Bachelor by Panic! at the Disco and Lonely Boy by The Black Keys), the album also featured originals.

In 2020, van Aarssen would be awarded an Edison Jazzism Audience Award for his album Forever You.

The album How To Live was recorded together with the DVA Bigband in the E-Sounds Studio in Weesp and produced by Paul Willemsen. The album released in November 2021, just after the start of the 'Swinging On A Star' theater tour that started in October.

== Discography ==
=== Solo albums ===
- Forever You (2019)
- How To Live (2021)
- Christmas When You're Here (2023)
- Souvenirs (2025)

=== Collaborative albums ===
- Just Call It Love (2024) (Note: Collaboration with Jeff Franzel.)

=== Singles ===
Title	Year	Album / EP
"Modern World" (Note: This is a cover or rendition. Van Aarssen releases covers and renditions prominently.)	2019	Non-album single
"Superhero"	2019	Non-album single
"That's Life"	2019	TVOH Live Ronde
"The Lady Is A Tramp" (Note: Collaboration with Jackie Lou as part of The Voice of Holland.)	2019	Non-album single
"Doing Alright"	2019	Forever You
"Christmas Afterparty"	2019	Non-album single
"Strawberry Moon"	2020	Forever You
"This Too Shall Pass"	2020	Non-album single
"Meet Me In Miami"	2020	Non-album single
"Learnin' The Blues (with Dennis van Aarssen)"	2020	Non-album single
"Baby It's Cold Outside"	2020	Non-album single
"Santa Claus Is Coming To Town"	2020	Non-album single
"Can't Leave Her Alone"	2021	How To Live
"Trip Around The Sun"	2021	How To Live
"Neon Lights"	2021	How To Live
"I Still Got It"	2021	How To Live
"Christmas Memories"	2021	Non-album single
"Have Yourself A Merry Little Christmas"	2021	Non-album single
"I Can't Make This Right"	2022	Non-album single
"Everytime When Christmas Comes Around"	2022	Christmas When You're Here
"(Will You Be) Gone By Christmas Night"	2022	Christmas When You're Here
"Until Next Christmas"	2023	Christmas When You're Here
"This Time Of Year"	2023	Christmas When You're Here
"Cloudy"	2024	Just Call It Love
"Waiting For Tonight"	2024	Just Call It Love

=== Collaborations with Black Tie Affair (Note: Black Tie Affair is a group van Aarssen himself is a part of, though the group releases their music as collaborations exclusively.) ===
Title	Year
"She Can Make The Rain Go"	2021
"Down Below"	2022
"Throwback"	2022
"Lifeline"	2023

== Notes ==
Awards and achievements
Preceded by Jim van der Zee	Winner of The Voice of Holland; Season nine (2018–2019)	Succeeded by Sophia Kruithof
