= Carve the Mark =

2017 novel by Veronica Roth

- The cover art of Carve the Mark
- Author: Veronica Roth
- Language: English
- Genre: Science fiction, space opera, young adult fiction
- Publisher: Katherine Tegen Books
- Publication date: January 17, 2017
- Publication place: United States
- Media type: Print (hardcover), e-book, paperback
- Pages: 480
- ISBN: 978-0062348630
- Followed by: The Fates Divide

Carve the Mark is a science fiction young adult novel. It is the fifth novel by Veronica Roth, published on January 17, 2017, by HarperCollins. The story follows Akos and Cyra, young people from opposing cultures whose fates are intertwined. Its sequel The Fates Divide was released on April 10, 2018.

== Setting ==
The characters of Carve the Mark live among nine planets. Each planet has different rules, governments, people, and language, although each planet lives in accordance with general, interplanetary rules each has agreed to. This general order is kept by the Assembly, composed of a leader and all Assembly associates who live on a large, travelling spaceship; recently, the Assembly's authority has come into question with some suspecting the Assembly of corruption and opposing some beliefs the nations have continued to honor for thousands of years. The names of the planets are: Othyr, Kollande, Ogra, Essander, Zold, Pitha, Trella, Tepes and Thuvhe/Urek.

The Shotet and Thuvhesit live on the same planet, Urek/Thuvhe, and have a long history of violence, blaming certain historical events on each other. The two peoples are separated by a large expanse of feathergrass, a tall grass that causes hallucinations. The Shotet call their planet Urek whereas the Thuvhesit call it Thuvhe, but the planet is universally recognized only as Thuvhe and the Thuvhesit are the only recognized people/nation of the planet, even though the Shotet have been vying for that privilege for many generations.

The people of Shotet live mostly in poverty, while their leader and higher class hoard all imports and dole them out selectively. The people of Shotet are very skilled in combat, in contrast to the Thuvhesit, who only possess a meager army of trained soldiers. At the time the story takes place, the Shotet are governed by the Noavek family, who are known for having a history of killing siblings and other family members, and the Shotet slowly go to ruin under their governing.

In their galaxy, there is a force called the current, which flows through every living being, and can be seen visibly as the "currentstream," manifesting as lights wrapped around the planets. Originally, the current was seen as holy and sacred to the people of the planets; though still revered by many, fewer and fewer carry on their worship of the current. Every person in the galaxy has a currentgift, which is a certain talent unique to them; their currentgift typically develops during puberty or times of dire need/extreme emotion.

The Shotet have several rituals unique to their culture. One is the ritual of carving a mark on their arm with a currentblade, a knife that harnesses the current, to symbolize a life. This can represent a life that they took, which is most often the case, or a loss they grieve, which is represented by through a diagonal hash through the original horizontal mark. Another important part of Shotet culture is the revelatory tongue, their term for the way their language is inherited, instead of learned like other languages.

== Plot ==
The story centers around two main characters: Cyra Noavek and Akos Kereseth. Cyra is the second child of the Noavek family, the ruling clan of the Shotet; her currentgift is pain, showing itself visibly in dark, shadowy tendrils that flow under her skin. Anyone who touches her skin experiences extreme pain, while she herself is constantly tortured by pain. As a child, she accidentally killed her mother with her powers during a fit. Afterwards, her father and brother Ryzek push her away, and she's largely raised by a maid. One year, her father does not return from the annual scavenging journey, and Ryzek is forced to rule in the wake of his presumed death. He manages to slightly improve the conditions of the Shotet, but forces Cyra to torture people for him, holding the threat of telling how their mother really died to the public over her head.

Akos Kereseth and his family of five live in a poorer community of Thuvhe. His mother is the current oracle, and this leads to Ryzek seeking out the Kereseth family, as he's searching for an oracle to try and control his future. He sends soldiers after Akos's mother and one of her sons, as one of them was fated to be the next oracle, and one day, after Akos and his siblings are sent home from school, they are ambushed by the soldiers, who kill their father and take the two boys. They discover that Eijeh is the next oracle and Akos possesses the revelatory tongue. During capture, Akos discovers his currentgift, the ability to interrupt, or stop, the current, which he uses to escape his restrain and kill one of the soldiers. However, he and his brother fail to escape and are brought to Ryzek.

Akos is taken to a boot camp for soldiers to train and begins to work his way up. Eventually, he becomes Cyra's personal pain-reliever, as he's able to stop the current under her skin and cease her pain. The two become close friends, and Akos teaches Cyra how to make a pain reliever that actually works and Cyra in return teaches him how to fight. Akos is planning on escaping and returning to Thuvhe, but refuses to leave without his brother.

After their capture and recruitment, Elijeh is tortured into forcing his currentgift to manifest. Upon it manifesting, Ryzek uses his currentgift to switch memories with Elijeh, hoping to gain Elijeh's ability to see into the future in the process; he theorizes that one's currentgift is part of who they are, and that by taking on aspects of Elijeh, he can gain Elijeh's currentgift. Elijeh begins to show similar traits to Ryzek and is always by his side as his ever-present adviser. Akos refuses to lose hope, however, and is determined to keep his promise to his father to bring Elijeh home.

Thanks to Akos, Cyra's perspective begins to change and she gets caught up with a secret group of Shotet rebels who disagree with the ruling Noavek family and plan on assassinating Ryzek. She turns her back on Ryzek and focuses on trying to get Akos safely home, believing Elijeh is a lost cause. However, the plan falls through and she and Akos are forced to torture each other to reveal information Ryzek wants. But Cyra learns how to control her currentgift, and kills herself momentarily in the process, therefore thwarting Ryzek. The rebels manage to get Akos out while he's unconscious and they take him to a hospital in Thuvhe, where he meets his childhood friend Ori and her twin sister, the Chancellor, Isae.

Ryzek releases the true story of how his mother died to the public, causing them to hate Cyra even more. He strips her of her title in a ritual called nemhalzak, where one's social status is lowered to the bottom of society, making it so that anyone can challenge them to a fight to the death. Cyra is challenged by a great number of people, and she defeats all of them, until Vas Kuzar, Ryzek's right-hand man who is unable to feel pain, challenges her and almost kills her, but Cyra is rescued just in time.

She, Akos, Isae, and the rebels make a plan to kill Ryzek, and rescue Ori, who'd been captured by Ryzek. Things don't go as planned, and they end up barely escaping the planet with a few prisoners and some dead, leaving Voa in total chaos.

== Development of the novel ==
On March 2, 2015, it was officially announced that Veronica Roth had reached a two-book deal with HarperCollins. On May 5, 2016, the title of the first book and the release date were revealed. Carve the Mark was published on January 17, 2017, by HarperCollins and its sequel “The Fates Divide” was released in 2018. HarperCollins described the books as being "in the vein of Star Wars, the story of a boy who forms an unlikely alliance with an enemy."

== Reception ==
Carve the Mark received mixed reviews. Brian Truitt of USA Today wrote that despite the "overwhelming amount of exposition" which opens the novel, the story "excels when settling into the core relationship between its two embattled leads." Kirkus Reviews said that though "the book is not without its flaws," it is "brimming with plot twists and highly likely to please Roth’s fans." Nivea Serreo of Entertainment Weekly gave the book a B. Carol Memmott of the Chicago Tribune said that though Roth has "built a stunning world," the lead characters' "perpetual grimness might make it hard for some readers to fully invest in cheering them on." Danielle Zimmerman of Hypable said the book was "an engaging sci-fi story."
