= Navarone (band) =

Dutch alternative rock band

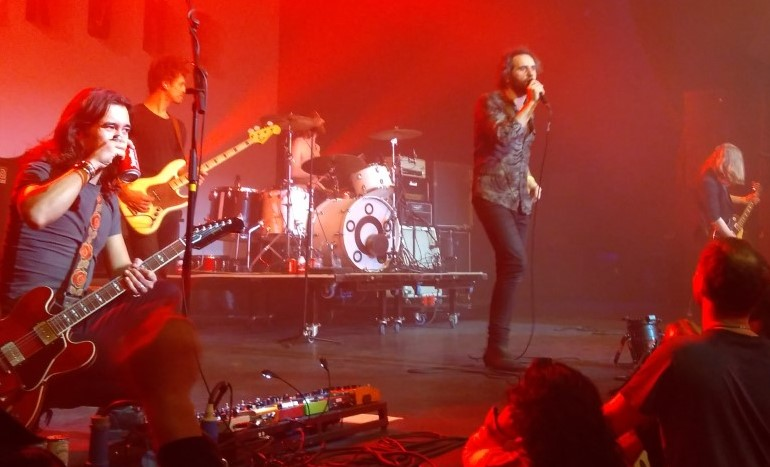
- Navarone performing live in December 2019

Background information
- Origin: Nijmegen, Netherlands
- Genres: Hard rock, alternative rock, progressive rock
- Years active: 2004–2024
- Members: Merijn van Haren; Kees Lewiszong; Bram Versteeg; Robin Assen; Roman Huijbreghs
- Website: www.navaronemusic.com

Navarone was a Dutch alternative rock band, formed in Nijmegen in 2008 and disbanded in 2024.

== Biography ==
Navarone originated as a musical project between lead singer Merijn van Haren and guitarist Kees Lewiszong. In their early years, still performing under the name Overthrow, they caught the attention of Golden Earring, eventually leading to a series of opening acts for their shows. Golden Earring's frontman Barry Hay came up with the idea of renaming their band to The Guns of Navarone. Even though the name was well received, the band thought the resemblance with the name Guns N' Roses was too close, so eventually they settled with the name Navarone.

Their first EP was recorded and released in 2009, which led them to the final round of The Next Best Band contest, airplay on 3FM in Rob Stenders' Indecent Proposal, a number-one notation on KX-Radio, and a series of live performances, including one on Paaspop. The band stayed under the radar for a period of two years as their band members were granted the opportunity to graduate and have their lead singer Merijn recover from a vocal issue. After a period of rest and a summer of rehearsal, they released their first album, A Darker Shade of White, in the summer of 2012.

In May 2014, the band released their second studio album, Vim and Vigor. The album was succeeded in November 2014 by the live album and DVD A Date at the Chapel, which documented two acoustic concerts of Navarone with a classical ensemble.

In 2018, the band competed in the ninth season of The Voice of Holland, turned all four chairs at their Blind auditions and selected Anouk as their coach. They eventually finished as runner-up overall and were the first band to compete as well as reach the finale in the history of the show.

They played their last show in January 2024 in Doornroosje, Nijmegen.

== Members ==
- Merijn van Haren (lead singer, 2004–2024)
- Kees Lewiszong (lead guitarist, 2004–2024)
- Bram Versteeg (bassist, 2005–2024)
- Robin Assen (drums, 2004–2024)
- Roman Huijbreghs (rhythm guitarist and vocals, 2004–2024)

== Discography ==
=== Studio albums ===
- A Darker Shade of White (2012)
- Vim and Vigor (2014)
- Oscilation (2017)
- Salvo (2018)
- V (2023)

=== Other releases ===
- Navarone - EP (2009)
- A Date at the Chapel - Live & DVD (2014)
- Loud and Clear - EP (2018)

=== Singles and promos ===
- Highland Bull (2012)
- December (2013)
- The Red Queen (2014)
- Smash 'n Grab (2014)
- Step by Step (2017)
- Soon I'll be Home (2018)
- Lonely Nights (2018)
- Loud and Clear (2018)
- Cerberus (2018)
- The Strong Survive (2018)
- Perfect Design (2019)
