= The Apprentice: Martha Stewart =

2005 reality television series

- Genre: Reality television
- Presented by: Martha Stewart
- Country of origin: United States
- Original language: English
- No. of seasons: 1
- No. of episodes: 13

Production
- Executive producers: Mark Burnett; Jay Bienstock; Donald Trump; Conrad Riggs; Kevin Harris
- Running time: 60 minutes
- Production company: Mark Burnett Productions

Original release
- Network: NBC
- Release: September 21 – December 21, 2005

The Apprentice: Martha Stewart is an American reality television series broadcast by NBC. Hosted by businesswoman Martha Stewart, the series premiered on September 21, 2005, and concluded with its thirteenth episode on December 21, 2005.

Tasks were centered on Stewart's areas of expertise: media, culinary arts, entertaining, decorating, crafts, design, merchandising, and style. The tone of the show was somewhat muted compared to the original, as Stewart brought her own sensibilities to the elimination process, often simply saying goodbye with her own catchphrase of "You just don't fit in", in contrast to original series host Donald Trump's catchphrase: "You're fired." She also wrote a cordial letter to the candidate who was fired; many times she took subtle jabs at the fired candidate and gave frank reasons for why the candidate did not succeed on the show. Several segments featuring Stewart were filmed at her home in Bedford, New York because at the time, she was serving the five-month house arrest portion of her ImClone scandal conviction.

Donald Trump, Mark Burnett and Jay Bienstock executive produced the show. Businessman Charles Koppelman and Stewart's daughter, Alexis Stewart accompanied the two teams during tasks and reported their observations to Stewart in the boardroom.

The two teams, Matchstick and Primarius, competed in 11 challenges. Overall, Primarius won eight, while Matchstick (candidates were reshuffled after Matchstick lost several times in a row) won only three.

The show's theme song is "Sweet Dreams (Are Made of This)" by Eurythmics. The logo is a businesswoman in a dress running with a bag instead of a businessman running with a briefcase. The background music is written by David Vanacore, Mark T, Williams, and Jeff Lippencott.

Despite the fairly big initial hype (Stewart was embroiled in a media firestorm over her criminal conviction), ratings for the spin-off were relatively weak. This show averaged only 7 million viewers, and garnered a mediocre 2.5 average in the very important demographic of 18- to 49-year-old viewers. However, this program aired against very tough competition, including ABC's massive hit Lost. After the second episode, the show was moved from the 8 p.m. time slot to the 9 p.m. slot, and in spite of facing Lost, saw a slight increase in ratings.

There have been numerous rumors thrown out as to why the show failed, including: "too much" Martha Stewart (her Martha daytime program and this prime time program), confusion between this version and Trump's version which airs the day after (on Thursday nights), apathy over reality shows in general, NBC's declining fortunes, fatigue with the Apprentice franchise itself, and weak casting, although some felt the cast was superior to Apprentice 4, which ran concurrently. Trump blamed the Martha series for the declining ratings of his own version, even though the ratings for his show began to fall over a year before Martha's version premiered. Stewart responded in turn that she was supposed to have "fired" Trump in the premiere episode, making her a successor to Trump rather than the host of a spin-off. In mid-November 2005, NBC announced that it would not bring back the show for a second season, although the network and Stewart claimed that the show was initially planned as a one-season endeavor.

Within a few years of the end of the series, three of the top runners-up (Bethenny, Marcela, and Leslie) were participating in other television ventures, with second-place finisher Bethenny Frankel parlaying her fame from the inaugural cast The Real Housewives of New York City into further reality shows, television hosting, books, and a successful business, Skinnygirl Cocktails. Fourth-place finisher Ryan Danz appeared on the 21st season of The Amazing Race alongside his girlfriend Abbie Ginsberg. They finished in 5th place. A third contestant, Shawn Killinger, would go on to be a popular on air host at QVC.

== Broadcast history ==
On November 14, 2005, NBC announced that the show would not return for a second season. However, the network claimed that it always intended to only produce one season of the show.

== Candidates ==
Candidate	Background	Original team	Age	Hometown	Result
Dawna Stone	Magazine Publisher	Primarius	37	St. Petersburg, Florida	Hired by Martha Stewart
Bethenny Frankel	Natural Foods Chef	Matchstick	34	New York City, New York	Sent home in the finale
Jim Bozzini	Ad Executive	Matchstick	36	Gilbertsville, Pennsylvania	Sent home in week 12
Ryan Danz	Recent Law Graduate	Primarius	28	Cardiff, California	Sent home in week 11
Marcela Valladolid	Cooking Instructor	Matchstick	27	Tijuana, Mexico	Sent home in week 11
Leslie Sanchez	Marketing Company Owner	Primarius	36	Alexandria, Virginia	Sent home in week 10
Amanda Hill	Attorney	Primarius	30	Austin, Texas	Sent home in week 9
Howie Greenspan	Fashion Company Owner	Primarius	33	Closter, New Jersey	Sent home in week 8
Carrie Gugger	Creative Director	Primarius	31	San Diego, California	Sent home in week 7
Sarah Brennan	Event Planner	Primarius	25	Washington, D.C.	Sent home in week 7
David Karandish	Internet Company Owner	Matchstick	22	Maplewood, Missouri	Sent home in week 6
Jennifer Le	Prosecutor	Primarius	32	Los Angeles, California	Sent home in week 5
Dawn Silvia	PR Consultant	Matchstick	33	Boston, Massachusetts	Sent home in week 4
Shawn Killinger	TV Newscaster	Matchstick	32	Grosse Pointe, Michigan	Sent home in week 3
Chuck Soldano	Interior Designer	Matchstick	38	Philadelphia, Pennsylvania	Sent home in week 2
Jeff Rudell	Creative Director	Matchstick	42	New York City, New York	Sent home in week 1

== Weekly results ==
Candidate	Original team	Week 4 team	Week 5 team	Week 8 team	Application result	Record as project manager
Dawna Stone	Primarius	Primarius	Matchstick	Primarius	Hired by Martha Stewart	3-0 (win in weeks 1, 7 & 10)
Bethenny Frankel	Matchstick	Matchstick	Primarius	Primarius	Sent home in the Series Finale	1-1 (win in week 11, loss in week 8)
Jim Bozzini	Matchstick	Matchstick	Primarius	Primarius	Sent home in week 12	2-0 (win in weeks 6 & 9)
Ryan Danz	Primarius	Primarius	Matchstick	Matchstick	Sent home in week 11	2-1 (win in weeks 5 & 8, loss in week 11)
Marcela Valladolid	Matchstick	Matchstick	Matchstick	Matchstick	Sent home in week 11	0-2 (loss in week 6 & 9)
Leslie Sanchez	Primarius	Matchstick	Matchstick	Matchstick	Sent home in week 10	0-2 (loss in weeks 4 & 10)
Amanda Hill	Primarius	Primarius	Matchstick	Matchstick	Sent home in week 9	1-0 (win in week 4)
Howie Greenspan	Primarius	Primarius	Primarius	Primarius	Sent home in week 8	1-0 (win in week 3)
Carrie Gugger	Primarius	Primarius	Primarius		Sent home in week 7	1-0 (win in week 2)
Sarah Brennan	Primarius	Primarius	Primarius		Sent home in week 7	0-1 (loss in week 7)
David Karandish	Matchstick	Matchstick	Matchstick		Sent home in week 6	0-1 (loss in week 3)
Jennifer Le	Primarius	Primarius	Primarius		Sent home in week 5	0-1 (loss in week 5)
Dawn Silvia	Matchstick	Matchstick			Sent home in week 4	
Shawn Killinger	Matchstick				Sent home in week 3	
Chuck Soldano	Matchstick				Sent home in week 2	0-1 (loss in week 2)
Jeff Rudell	Matchstick				Sent home in week 1	0-1 (loss in week 1)

Elimination chart
No.	Candidate	1	2	3	4	5	6	7	8	9	10	11	12	13
1	Dawna	WIN	IN	IN	IN	IN	IN	WIN	IN	IN	WIN	IN	IN	HIRED
2	Bethenny	IN	IN	BR	BR	IN	IN	BR	LOSE	IN	IN	WIN	IN	FIRED
3	Jim	BR	BR	BR	IN	BR	WIN	IN	BR	WIN	IN	IN	FIRED	
4	Ryan	IN	IN	IN	IN	WIN	IN	IN	WIN	BR	BR	FIRED		
5	Marcela	IN	IN	BR	IN	IN	LOSE	IN	IN	LOSE	BR	FIRED		
6	Leslie	IN	IN	IN	LOSE	IN	IN	IN	IN	IN	FIRED			
7	Amanda	IN	IN	IN	WIN	IN	IN	IN	IN	FIRED				
8	Howie	IN	IN	WIN	IN	IN	IN	BR	FIRED					
9	Carrie	IN	WIN	IN	IN	IN	IN	FIRED						
10	Sarah	IN	IN	IN	IN	IN	IN	FIRED						
11	David	IN	IN	LOSE	IN	IN	FIRED							
12	Jennifer	IN	IN	IN	IN	FIRED								
13	Dawn	BR	BR	BR	FIRED									
14	Shawn	IN	IN	FIRED										
15	Chuck	IN	FIRED											
16	Jeff	FIRED												

The candidate was hired and won the competition
The candidate won as project manager on his/her team
The candidate lost as project manager on his/her team
The candidate was on the winning team for this task / they passed the Interviews stage.
The candidate was on the losing team for this task.
The candidate was brought to the final boardroom
The candidate was sent home or fired
The candidate lost as project manager and was sent home or fired

== Episodes ==
=== Week 1: Once Upon a Time and Dream ===
- Airdate: September 21, 2005
- Hosting Company: Random House
- Pre-task: After being shown to the converted loft that would serve as the candidates' accommodation, the group was instructed to divide itself into two teams of eight. Since the gender split was 10–6 in favor of the women, the teams could not be divided along gender lines as was usually done on the original show, and the candidates eventually organized themselves into a "business" team (Primarius) and a "creative" team (Matchstick).
- Project: Teams had to design and write a children's book and read it to a group of first graders.
- Primarius project manager: Dawna
- Matchstick project manager: Jeff
- Winning team: Primarius
  - Reasons for win: Their book was entertaining, age-appropriate and near-unanimously preferred by the first graders, as well as Martha and the Random House executives.
  - Primarius's reward: A Japanese dinner with Martha
- Losing team: Matchstick
  - Reasons for loss: Though the story was fairly well-written and the illustration work was praised, the usage of rhyming verse was felt to have misfired badly, and the book was agreed to have been targeted at the wrong age range. The Random House executives said it would be more appropriate for fourth graders than first.
  - Sent to Conference Room: Jeff, Dawn, Jim
- Eliminated: Jeff Rudell, for taking over the entire project and not listening to his teammates. While Dawn was sharply criticized for bailing out of her original task of writing the book, Martha decided that since Jeff had decided to take on virtually the whole task after that happened, he deserved total blame for the loss.
  - Dismissal comment: "You just don't fit in."
  - Martha's letter: "Dear Jeffrey, I'm sorry that you are the first to go. Not to fail, but rather, not to fully succeed. You entered this serious endeavor, knowing that someone would have to leave after the first task. Unfortunately, it is you. Personally, it is hard to make such a judgment call. But it is part of this interview process. Good luck, travel safely, it was great to meet you. Cordially, Martha Stewart."
- Special notes:
  - As the series began, a possible conflict of interest arose, as Frankel used to be friends with Jennifer Koppelman-Hutt. Hutt is the daughter of Charles Koppelman, and is also Alexis Stewart's partner and co-host on a radio program broadcast through the Sirius Satellite Radio network. Koppelman and Alexis Stewart served as Martha's "eyes and ears," observing the performance of candidates during various tasks in the competition.

=== Week 2: Business Is Blooming ===
- Airdate: September 28, 2005
- Hosting Company: Martha Stewart Living Omnimedia
- Project: Teams had to sell flowers in high-end floral shops.
- Primarius project manager: Carrie
- Matchstick project manager: Chuck
- Winning team: Primarius
  - Reasons for win: The team hired a professional arranger to set up their shop. Despite trouble caused by the initially high prices, they ultimately managed to sell most of their stock after reducing their prices. Primarius made a profit of $1,866.
  - Primarius's reward: Volunteering with New York Cares (New York City's leading volunteer organization - www.nycares.org) to create a garden for a Community Center in the Chelsea neighborhood
- Losing team: Matchstick
  - Reasons for loss: Their mass-marketing strategy did not pay off, and they didn't sell nearly enough flowers to have a chance of victory. While their shop was well-decorated, their promotional scheme had a terrible idea of hiring the women selling flowers not only with their Dutch tacky outfits, but they were stood in the wrong corner of the street. They only had a profit of $969.
  - Sent to Conference Room: Chuck, Jim, Dawn
- Eliminated: Chuck Soldano, for poor leadership, threatening to quit during the task, and for essentially admitting that Martha should send him home.
  - Dismissal comment: "I wish you good luck and good-bye."
  - Martha's letter: "Dear Chuck, in a business like Martha Stewart Living Omnimedia, teams work in unison toward a common goal: success. The project can be simple or complex, but the team makes it happen. There was no teamwork here, and little leadership. I think you are creative, but easily flustered in a confusing situation. It is better that you leave now and concentrate on your strengths. Most cordially, Martha Stewart. Good luck, safe traveling."
- Special notes:
  - After being unable to control the team early in the task, Chuck attempted to quit both as project manager and from the show itself, which caused Jim to give him a pep talk and persuade him to continue. In the initial meeting with Martha, Chuck admitted early on that he was the most at fault for the loss and probably the person who should be sent home, though he made it clear that he didn't intend to actually quit.
  - There was an ugly dispute between Dawn and Jim during the task, which led to Chuck deciding to bring them into the Conference Room. Martha indicated that Bethenny and Shawn should have been brought back instead since they were responsible for the unsuccessful promotional scheme, though given Chuck's evident lack of desire to remain in the competition this may have been a deliberate choice on his part.
  - Following Chuck's dismissal, Martha warned Dawn and Jim that she could have easily sent either one (or both) of them home had it not been for Chuck declining to make any argument as to why he should stay, and that she expected more of them in the future.

=== Week 3: Bake It 'Til You Make It ===
- Airdate: October 5, 2005
- Hosting Company: Michael C. Fina
- Project: Teams had to design and sell a wedding cake.
- Primarius project manager: Howie
- Matchstick project manager: David
- Winning team: Primarius
  - Reasons for win: Their simple but elegant design appealed to potential customers at the wedding expo, and they sold five cakes for a total profit of $3,658.
  - Primarius's reward: Dinner at Jean-George with Donald and Melania Trump
- Losing team: Matchstick
  - Reasons for loss: Their unorthodox design with pink bows and an asymmetrical shape proved very difficult to sell, and ultimately ended with the team failing to sell a single cake, and needless to say, making no money whatsoever.
  - Sent to Conference Room: All of Matchstick. David initially wanted to bring back Dawn and Marcela, but Martha decided to override his decision and had the remaining team-members return to the Conference Room. Martha did not see Dawn as being responsible at all, and while she felt Marcela deserved some of the blame for her design decisions, she saw the sales team of Jim, Bethenny and Shawn as being more directly at fault.
- Eliminated: Shawn Killinger, for making no sales and for telling Charles that she deserved to be fired if her team lost. Martha was also unhappy with Shawn's "fake it 'til you make it" remark during the task and felt that Shawn wasn't in the process for the right reasons.
  - Dismissal comment: "I wish you well, but I'm going to have to say goodbye."
  - Martha's letter: "Dear Shawn, tonight I know was difficult for you. You have a career in television. You can develop your talent in the medium very well. You look good, you speak well, and you certainly are talkative. The culture at MSLO is very complex, and I want to stress again that what we do here has to be thorough, through and through. Beautiful from the inside-out, just like the wedding cake. You, as you build your career, will find your business lesson to be valid and true. Best of luck, Martha Stewart"
- Special notes:
  - Jim's wife gave birth to their second child during the course of the task. Jim speaks to her over the phone several times over the two days.
  - Martha expressed disappointment that the creative-minded Matchstick had not only lost three tasks in a row but hadn't even come close to defeating the corporate-focused Primarius in any of the tasks.
  - Following her dismissal, Martha expressed doubts that Shawn had ever had any real interest in becoming a business executive, and felt she was more interested in the fame that would go with starring in the show.

=== Week 4: Sweet Suite ===
- Airdate: October 12, 2005
- Hosting Company: Westin Hotels
- Project: Teams had to create a fantasy suite in a Westin Hotel.
- Primarius project manager: Amanda
- Matchstick project manager: Leslie
- Winning team: Primarius
  - Reasons for win: While the deciding factor was ultimately Matchstick's failure to finish their own room, the Westin executives and the focus group really liked the touches in Primarius's suite.
  - Primarius's reward: Enjoying the hotel suite that they had finished, with a surprise visit from Martha.
- Losing team: Matchstick
  - Reasons for loss: The executives really liked their theme, but the room was left unfinished. This was due to their sofa not arriving on time, which ultimately cost them the victory. Leslie and Bethenny blamed each other for this, with Leslie saying it was Bethenny's responsibility to order the furniture, and Bethenny accusing Leslie of taking too long to come up with a concept on the first day, causing the entire project to be rushed.
  - Sent to Conference Room: Leslie, Dawn, Bethenny
  - Firing verdict: As Leslie and Bethenny argued against each other over the sofa issue, Dawn spoke up and criticized Leslie's design decisions. Leslie angrily demanded to know why Dawn hadn't given her this feedback during the task, and Bethenny in turn called Dawn out for her lackluster efforts. While Dawn argued she did not make any critical mistakes that contributed to her team's four losses, Martha felt Dawn did nothing of significance to prevent them from losing.
- Eliminated: Dawn Silvia, for being brought back to the Conference Room four times in a row due to her awful attitude and work ethic, along with making a variety of excuses for being a poor contributor.
  - Dismissal comment: "You don't seem to be functioning as a member of the team, you just are not effective. So therefore Dawn, I'll say goodbye."
  - Martha's letter: "Dear Dawn, I'm sorry that you must leave the team Matchstick. But after four losses, it is clear that you are not making significant contributions to the group, and really don't fit the idea of a real employee of MSLO. We want you to succeed, and we certainly wish you well. Good luck and have a good trip home. Sincerely, Martha Stewart."
- Special note:
  - Due to Matchstick being three members down and no clear leader emerging in the group, Martha asked for a volunteer to move over from Primarius and lead the team, which Leslie volunteered to do.
  - In the Conference Room, Leslie repeatedly claimed that Matchstick would have won if the sofas had arrived on time. Martha pointed out that firstly that argument was irrelevant since Matchstick didn't win, and secondly that Leslie couldn't make that claim when she hadn't seen Primarius's suite.
  - Martha was disturbed by Matchstick's four straight losses and commented that she wanted them to succeed and that she would have do a reshuffling of epic proportions.

=== Week 5: Mixed Greens ===
- Airdate: October 19, 2005
- Hosting Company: Wishbone
- Project: Teams had to create a salad dressing and sell it at a Stew Leonard's supermarket.
- Primarius project manager: Jennifer
- Matchstick project manager: Ryan
- Winning team: Matchstick
  - Reasons for win: The team managed to sell almost their entire stock and won by just $20. Matchstick sold 453 bottles of $1,580.97 in profit.
  - Matchstick's reward: A trip on a Schooner around New York City.
- Losing team: Primarius
  - Reasons for loss: Despite a higher price, they sold 50 bottles less than Matchstick. Jennifer struggled to control her team and Jim's lewd remarks nearly got their display shut down altogether. Primarius only sold 391 bottles of $1,560.09 in profit.
  - Sent to Conference Room: Jennifer, Jim
- Eliminated: Jennifer Le, for her weak leadership and for not taking Jim off the task after his misconduct. Martha also found it hard to believe that a prosecutor would be scared of someone working for her.
  - Dismissal comment: "It's kind of obvious that you can't defend yourself. Jennifer, you're just not working for me."
  - Martha's letter: "Dear Jennifer, thank you for being an Apprentice candidate. I hope you found it an interesting diversion from your regular job. We're sorry that it didn't work out. We wish you well, travel safely. Cordially, Martha Stewart."
- Special notes:
  - In the prologue, Martha requested both teams to report back to the Conference Room. Martha asked Primarius who has not yet been a project leader. Martha selects Ryan to lead Matchstick and Jennifer was asked to lead Primarius. As Martha was discouraged that Matchstick had heavily lost four tasks in a row, she decided to reshuffle the teams. Ryan selects Dawna, Amanda, Leslie, David, and Marcela for Matchstick. Jennifer selects Howie, Sarah, Carrie, Bethenny, and Jim for Primarius.
  - Officially Amanda, Dawna, and Ryan are transferred to Matchstick. Bethenny and Jim are transferred to Primarius.
  - Sarah, Carrie, Howie, and Jennifer are still in their original team Primarius and David, Leslie, and Marcela are still in Matchstick.
  - Matchstick wins for the first time in the series, putting David and Marcela on the winning team for the first (and in David's case, only) time.
  - This is the first time a two-person boardroom takes place and it is the first time Martha chooses the final boardroom candidates instead of the project manager.
  - After Jennifer left, Charles and Alexis admitted they couldn't even remember what she'd done during any of the prior tasks. Consequently, Martha's letter to Jennifer ended up being by far the shortest one given to a departing candidate this season and said little beyond wishing her well in the future.
  - Wishbone debuted a new television commercial during this episode, featuring Charles and Alexis eating Wishbone salad dressing. In the ad, Alexis jokingly whispers to Charles that they can't let her mother know they're eating Wishbone dressing.

=== Week 6: Every Dog Has His Day ===
- Airdate: October 26, 2005
- Hosting Company: Purina Beneful
- Project: Teams had to create an auction package with various celebrities and then raise the most money during the auction.
- Primarius project manager: Jim
- Matchstick project manager: Marcela
- Winning team: Primarius
  - Reasons for win: Their celebrity experiences sold for generally very high prices. Primarius's revenue was $44,100.
  - Primarius's reward: No reward, as this was a charity event.
- Losing team: Matchstick
  - Reasons for loss: Despite the exceptionally high final bid for their Fran Drescher experience (which nearly won them the task single-handedly), their other items sold for much lower average prices than those of Primarius. Matchstick's revenue was $40,350.
  - Martha's thoughts: When asked who should be eliminated, half of them called out Marcela for being a weak PM and not making a single contribution to the negotiations, while the other half called out David for not only not contributing to the negotiations, but being young & inexperienced. Martha had enough evidence to claim David & Marcela as the weakest players on the team, and requested both to be sent back to the Conference Room.
  - Sent to Conference Room: Marcela, David
- Eliminated: David Karandish, for not contributing a lot on the task and for being too young and inexperienced. Martha could have eliminated Marcela for not only being a weak PM, but not actually taking the negotiations correctly. But in the end, David was sent home for being ineffective in the negotiations with Merv Griffin and for playing safe on all the tasks he performed, including a weak self-defense on why he's well-suited to be in the process than Marcela.
  - Dismissal comment: "Right now, I think you need a little more experience. You're not ready for an executive position. Goodbye."
  - Martha's letter: "Dear David, thank you for your effort and your good-natured smile. I'm afraid that for this position, you really need some more business experience. And if and when you are ready to seriously talk internet to my internet department, we'd love to accommodate you. I admire your entrepreneurial spirit, and I know you will be successful. Hope to see you again, Martha Stewart. Safe travels."
- Special notes:
  - Matchstick's celebrities included Chad Pennington, Fran Drescher, Bruce Vilanch, Jordan Allard, and Merv Griffin.
  - Primarius' celebrities included Paul & Amanda Sorvino, Susan Lucci, John Lithgow & Joanna Gleason, and Todd Oldham.
  - Martha once again chooses the boardroom candidates.
  - This was Bethenny and Jim's first win. All other candidates who were still in the game had at least one win.
  - The charity auction was first used on the sixth episode of The Apprentice season 1.
  - In her closing letter to David, Martha asked him to keep in touch with her. While she did not consider him executive material, she said that she was impressed by the ideas he had for her website, and indicated that she might be able to give him a different role at her company in the future.

=== Week 7: Swimming Against the Tide ===
- Airdate: November 2, 2005
- Hosting Company: Tide
- Project: Teams had to create a live/performing billboard showcasing the new Tide to Go pen.
- Primarius project manager: Sarah
- Matchstick project manager: Dawna
- Winning team: Matchstick
  - Reasons for win: Guest judge Peter Arnell really loved Matchstick's concept of creating an auto racing-themed character for the live billboard, feeling that the character was well-developed enough that Tide could have immediately employed it in their actual campaign.
  - Matchstick's reward: Breakfast at Martha Stewart's home in Bedford with Peter Arnell.
- Losing team: Primarius
  - Reasons for loss: Sarah did not pay attention to the task briefing and instead treated their event primarily as a promotional give-away, not giving any real thought to the live billboard performance until about an hour beforehand. As a result, the event consisted of nothing more than the team repeatedly chanting "It's time for Tide to Go!" on their mobile stage with a bunch of street performers performing wholly unrelated acts. Peter called this the "most pathetic" display he had ever seen, noting that it was the kind of presentation that could instantly destroy the reputation of a company, and whoever commissioned it.
  - Sent to Conference Room: Sarah, Carrie, Bethenny, and Howie. - Initially, all of Primarius were recalled to the Conference Room because of the massive failure of the task. However, Martha asked Sarah who she would send back to the apartment, and she selected Jim, who it was generally agreed had been the most effective member of the team.
- Eliminated: Martha fired more than one person for the first time. She fired Sarah Brennan and Carrie Gugger for the following reasons:
  - Sarah Brennan, for her lousy leadership ability, inability to control her team, especially considering that she was an event planner by profession, and for repeatedly ignoring the suggestions of her teammates despite not having any strong ideas herself.
  - Carrie Gugger, for being Sarah's second-in-command, for also failing to come up with a strategy despite her creative background, and for having gone under the radar since winning as project manager on the second task. While Martha held Sarah to be primarily accountable for the loss, she decided to also eliminate Carrie as punishment for the disastrous failure of the task.
  - Dismissal comment: "Sarah, Carrie... neither one of you fit in."
  - Martha's letter (to Sarah): "Dear Sarah, I think if you work on your leadership skills, you can have a very successful career. You're young, appealing, attractive, and smart. I look forward to hearing about your next steps in the world of business. Best Wishes, Martha Stewart."
  - Martha's letter (to Carrie): “Dear Carrie, it was a difficult decision to choose you over your team-mates. But I think that both you and Sarah failed your team in leadership and also ideas. I wish you well, and hope that you focus on a career that uses your other considerable talents. Best Wishes, Martha Stewart.”
- Special notes:
  - Martha eliminates two people for the first time in the history of the show.
  - This is the third occurrence of more than one person being fired or sent home on the Apprentice series. The first was Maria and Wes in the second season of Donald Trump's Apprentice. The second had ironically occurred the previous week when Josh, Jennifer M., James and Mark were all fired for mass incompetence in the worst managed task in the history of Trump's show. A few weeks later, once again on Trump's Apprentice, Trump fired Brian and Marshawn, and then a few weeks after that, Trump fired Felisha and Alla.
  - Martha thought that Primarius had the worst failure of this task of this history of this show. The previews for the episode had featured Ryan (of Matchstick) in spandex as superhero "Tide-to-Go Joe", mock-punching Marcela (dressed up as a ketchup stain), thus leading many viewers to assume that Matchstick failed miserably. As it turned out, Peter Arnell loved Matchstick's presentation.
  - Dawna is the first person to be project manager twice, as well as the first to win twice.
  - Tide debuted a new television commercial during the episode, featuring a drill sergeant brandishing the Tide-to-Go pen and offering a contest for free tickets to The Apprentice: Martha Stewart live finale.
  - Howie actually had the idea to do a boxing-related campaign as well, but Sarah ignored his suggestion, despite not having any other ideas at all by that point. Sarah and Carrie agreed to gang up on Howie in the Conference Room, but this tactic backfired when Charles reminded them that they had repeatedly shrugged off the ideas that he and Bethenny presented.
  - According to Martha, the whole team except Jim did a lousy job on this task. She did give a little credit to Bethenny and Howie, for at least trying to come up with ideas despite being blocked at every turn by Sarah, but warned them that she expected them both to step up and make a strong effort in the next task.

=== Week 8: Don't Touch That Dial ===
- Airdate: November 9, 2005
- Hosting Company: QVC
- Project: Teams had to sell items on QVC. Matchstick sold a Self-Retracting Hose and Primarius sold the Bonnaire cordless self inflater.
- Primarius project manager: Bethenny
- Matchstick project manager: Ryan
- Winning team: Matchstick
  - Reasons for win: While they sold fewer units, they got a higher price and a total profit of $14,295.71.
  - Matchstick's reward: A helicopter ride to East Hampton and a tour of one of Martha Stewart's homes with Kevin Sharkey.
- Losing team: Primarius
  - Reasons for loss: Although they sold more units than Matchstick, they struggled on their sales pitch on QVC. Jim had a good sales pitch, but kept talking over Dawna and didn't look at the camera. Much of this was blamed on Howie, who did a last minute swap with Jim in the directors' role, leaving both the men completely unprepared for their new positions. They ended up with total sales of $11,911.48.
  - Sent to Conference Room: Bethenny, Jim, Howie
  - Martha's thoughts: Martha questioned Bethenny's leadership quality in that she was unable to control her team. Bethenny sensed weakness that she recognized her liability. Martha was also concerned about Howie's contributions in this task and felt that he did not push his full passion throughout the entire process.
- Eliminated: Howie Greenspan, for not putting enough effort into his original co-hosting role with Dawna, which led to his last-minute swap with Jim and ultimately caused the task to fail.
  - Dismissal comment: "Howie, I just don't get what you would do in our kind of company."
  - Martha's letter: "Dear Howie, I know you are successful, and I think that if you do put the effort in your own, home-started business with your wife, it will burgeon and grow. You are proud of your customer base; continue to service it, and you will reap great rewards. Best wishes, it was nice to see you here, Martha Stewart."
- Special notes:
  - Due to having the best performance record, Dawna is transferred back to Primarius because Matchstick has 5 players and Primarius has 3 players. Martha decided that the remaining players on Primarius needed help from a strong candidate due to the magnitude of the previous task's failure.
  - There was tension between Dawna and her new teammates throughout the task, after an incident early on she openly accused them of spending too much time goofing around and suggested that was why the team kept losing. Despite the other Primarius members in turn accusing her of being stiff and humorless, Dawna ultimately felt vindicated by the result, as Howie's failure to make a serious effort on the first day ended up derailing the task.
  - After letting Dawna go, Bethenny said that she had made a mistake and felt that she should have brought Dawna back instead of Jim, but Martha told her it was irrelevant, as she wouldn't even have considered sending Dawna home had she been brought back, and also didn't have any major reason to eliminate Jim since he had at least made an effort on the task.
  - The QVC task was first seen in The Apprentice season 2 episode 5.
  - Ads for this episode zeroed in on Jim, calling him "the male Omarosa", a reference to controversial Apprentice personality Omarosa Manigault-Stallworth.

=== Week 9: The Coffee Achievers ===
- Airdate: November 16, 2005
- Hosting Company: Tassimo
- Project: Teams had to sell the Tassimo Coffee Maker.
- Primarius project manager: Jim
- Matchstick project manager: Marcela
- Winning team: Primarius
  - Reasons for win: Despite a slow start, their sales eventually picked up after a strong push by the promotional company that Dawna hired. The three remaining team members also proved very effective at selling the coffee makers. Primarius sold 36 coffee units for a total revenue of $6,621.
  - Primarius' reward: A plane ride to Bar Harbor, Maine and a tour of one of Martha Stewart's homes with her daughter Alexis.
- Losing team: Matchstick
  - Reasons for loss: Matchtstick showed subpar energy during sales. Marcela overrode Ryan's original plan of a celebrity endorsement from Vincent Pastore in favor of hiring a pastry chef to cook free pastries to go with the sample drinks. All this resulted in was a heavy footflow of people looking for snacks, and less sales. To make things worse, the coffee makers were priced far too high at $299. As a result, they only sold 9 coffee units for $1,891, losing by $4,730.
  - Sent to Conference Room: Marcela, Amanda, Ryan
  - Martha's thoughts: In the Conference Room, Martha, Charles, and Alexis criticized Matchstick for lacking the "fire in the belly" with no chemistry and less teamwork in this task. Amanda effectively sealed her fate early in the conference room when she admitted that she "didn't support" Marcela during the task. She later claimed that what she really meant was that she disagreed with the decisions that Marcela was making, but Martha accused Amanda of backtracking and told her that it was too late to take back her comments, right before sending her home.
- Eliminated: Amanda Hill, for being disloyal and unhelpful to Marcela, and failing to convince Martha that she was in the competition for the right reasons. Marcela was criticized for (again) being a mediocre PM, little respect to her team (especially when coming up with concepts of the promotional sales) and having no ability to control her team, but Amanda was sent home for not showing Martha that she's a team player.
  - Dismissal comment: "Team-work is one of the most important things, and for that reason, Amanda, I have to say good-bye."
  - Martha's letter: "Dear Amanda, you have certain talents that can be used in many ways. I do think that you should focus on those things that interest you. Gardening, marketing, etcetera. I hope you have as much passion for your garden as you expressed. It will bring you and your family much joy. It was a pleasure knowing you."
- Special notes:
  - Jim encouraged Marcela, who had said if she lost as PM twice she would be ready to go home, to fight against Ryan and Amanda because he claimed he was previously in the scapegoat position (although he himself had put Dawn in a scapegoat position in episode 2). In the following episode Jim said that he had been hoping to keep in Marcela at the expense of Ryan, who he viewed as (along with Dawna) his strongest competition, though was happy for Amanda to have gone home.
  - This was the first reward for Bethenny and Jim. Their sole previous task win, the charity auction, had no reward, as Martha felt giving to charity was reward enough.
  - Vincent Pastore, who was mentioned but not seen on this episode due to Marcela vetoing Ryan's plan for him to appear, would later be a contestant on The Celebrity Apprentice, as well as having a cameo in The Celebrity Apprentice 2.

=== Week 10: A Ridiculous Display ===
- Airdate: November 30, 2005
- Hosting Company: Buick
- Project: Teams had set up a showroom for the new Buick Lucerne.
- Primarius project manager: Dawna
- Matchstick project manager: Leslie
- Winning team: Primarius
  - Reasons for win: Their showroom was very elegant and professional looking by using an artwork gallery, and having the car as the central piece of the display. As a result, the Buick executives decided to adopt it for showrooms nationwide.
  - Primarius' reward: A dinner at the Four Seasons Hotel with Charles Koppelman, chairman of MSO, and Susan Lyne, president and chief executive officer.
- Losing team: Matchstick
  - Reasons for loss: Martha and the executives liked Ryan's concept of the car being invited to dinner (showing it was more than just a vehicle, and part of the family), but thought that the execution was awful. The table in the showroom looked more like a bed, and Leslie's editing of the advert Ryan made caused the message to be lost.
  - Sent to Conference Room: Leslie, Ryan, and Marcela
- Eliminated: Leslie Sanchez, for her bad record as PM of 0–2, her lack of creativity, and her bad execution of Ryan's concept.
  - Dismissal comment: "Thank you, Leslie, but we just don't need you."
  - Martha's letter: "Dear Leslie, you almost made it to the last task. However, your skills would be put to better use in a marketing or consulting company, not MSLO. Focus on what you do best, and I have no doubt you will continue to be successful. I wish you well, as does Charles, and we hope you travel safely. Good luck, Martha Stewart. P.S. Alexis sends her best also."
- Special notes:
  - With this Primarius victory, Dawna now has three wins as project manager, but more noteworthy is her spotless record. She only has been on a losing team twice, and neither time had she been brought back to the boardroom by the project manager.
  - While Leslie and Marcela initially seemed to agree to gang up on Ryan in the conference room, when Martha actually asked Leslie who should be sent home she replied that it should be Marcela. Marcela felt betrayed, as she specifically avoided bringing Leslie back in the previous episode due to their close friendship, which resulted in a major argument between the two.

=== Week 11: Final Approach ===
- Airdate: December 7, 2005
- Hosting Company: Song Airlines
- Project: Teams had create a thirty-second commercial for a $99 Song Airlines flight from New York's JFK to Los Angeles' LAX.
- Primarius project manager: Bethenny
- Matchstick project manager: Ryan
- Winning team: Primarius
  - Reasons for win: Their advert on the whole was very well executed, scoring an average of 4.2 from the focus group. As a result, the executives have decided to run Primarius's advert as a "real spot".
  - Primarius' reward: Horseback riding with Martha Stewart at her Bedford home and a game of Scrabble.
- Losing team: Matchstick
  - Reasons for loss: Their advert was extremely sloppy, and Ryan completely missed their target demographic, having come up with the concept before even speaking to the executives. Their advert had an average rating of just 2.8 from the surveys.
  - Sent to Conference Room: Ryan and Marcela
  - Eliminated: Both of them, for the following reasons:
    - Ryan Danz, for drinking during the task and producing an ad that was not only extremely poor in quality, but inappropriate for Song Airlines' target audience.
    - Marcela Valladolid, for her bad track record including a bad record as project manager of 0–2 and being on 3 wins and 8 losses, not contributing any ideas toward the advert, and admitting having effectively given up on the competition before the task even began.
  - Dismissal comment: "Neither one of you really fit in."
  - Martha's letter (to Marcela): "Dear Marcela, your passion for food for the Hispanic market in America, and your hard work, are qualities we admire at MSLO. I think you have the makings for a really good food editor, food maker and even television performer. Best wishes, Martha Stewart."
  - Martha's letter (to Ryan): "Dear Ryan, you have the desire to try new things, and a lot of self-confidence. I think you need more focus, possibly more education, business for example. And I know you will then be ready for a big challenge. Best wishes, Martha Stewart."
- Special notes:
  - This is the second time Martha sent home more than one candidate, six including Trump's multiple-firings throughout the history of The Apprentice.
  - Matchstick is "out of business", as both Marcela and Ryan were the last members of the group. Including Trump's Season 4, in which Capital Edge went out of business following the eliminations of both Felisha and Alla, there have been two instances where a company has been shut down simply because all of the remaining candidates were eliminated.
  - Martha was puzzled as to why Marcela didn't step up as project manager, given that she had failed twice while Ryan had already proved himself as a project manager with two victories. Marcela responded by saying that she thought she would be fired whether she or Ryan led the task and thus didn't see the point in stepping up to manage the team, and this admission was largely responsible for her being sent home.
  - Despite the overwhelmingly negative reaction to Ryan's leadership and the advert that he produced, Charles indicated that he was sorry to see Ryan go, and had seen potential in him earlier in the season.
  - Dawna is the only candidate entering the next task having not been to the final conference room. She leads the series with a corporate record of 9–2, and a PM record of 3–0.
  - This episode aired after Delta Air Lines, which owns and operates Song, announced would eradicate the Song brand name in May 2006, and incorporate its aircraft into Delta's main operations.

=== Week 12: The Interviews and the Ultimate Task ===
- Airdate: December 14, 2005
- Task: One-on-one interviews with four important executives from Martha Stewart Living, including some the candidates might recognize from their reward dinners.
- Result: Dawna got near-unanimous praise from all four interviewers with her excellent business & management competency, the only major criticisms being that they felt she was a little too conservative, and was telling them the answers she felt they wanted to hear. Bethenny also got generally very positive comments, and was praised for her energy, creativity and determination, though was criticized of lacking focus. Jim on the other hand got overwhelmingly negative feedback, for his bizarre and at times inappropriate interview responses, terrible attitude, and indirectly admitting that he saw the process as a game rather than a job interview, with all four interviewers agreeing that they would not employ him in any role.
- Eliminated: Jim Bozzini, for being a loose cannon, treating the entire process as a game, and at the recommendation of the four executives.
  - Dismissal comment: "The game is over, Jim. You are out of here."
  - Martha's letter: "Dear Jim, I know you surprised yourself in this competition. I am proud that you went from a badly-losing team to one of the final three. You certainly surprised many people, finally allowing your creativity to shine, and your lack of focus to diminish. You succeeded where many thought you might fail. My best wishes to your patient family; they will be happy to have you home. I hope to see you and hear from you in the future. Martha Stewart."
  - Final Two: Dawna and Bethenny
  - For the final task, Bethenny and Dawna had to select three of the 14 eliminated candidates since the stakes of the final task is abnormally high
- Final Project for Bethenny: Hold a Circus event for the Apple & Eve Circus in association with the Boys and Girls Clubs of America
  - Bethenny's Recruits: Ryan, Jim, and Carrie
- Final Project for Dawna: Liz Claiborne Fashion Show and Charity Event for Safe Horizon (an organization combating domestic violence)
  - Dawna's Recruits: Amanda, Howie, and Sarah
- Special notes:
  - There are no more teams or project managers—all candidates are now on their own.
  - The one-on-one interviews with the executives has always been an Apprentice Tradition.
  - This competition required an interview week because the remaining candidates went from five to three at the end of week 11, unlike Trump's season 4, which did not require an interview week because the remaining candidates went from four candidates to two at the end of week 11.
  - Martha agreed that the decision to eliminate Jim was so obvious that they didn't even ask him (nor Bethenny or Dawna) to justify staying in the show, and immediately sent him home upon calling the final three into the conference room.
  - After being announced as the final two, Bethenny and Dawna congratulated each other upon returning to the loft, and celebrated their coronation as finalists with champagne.
  - Both finalists also browsed a photo album containing pictures of the fourteen eliminated candidates.
  - Jim, although happy to work with Bethenny, was perplexed as to why she chose Carrie, with whom she argued in episode 7, and Ryan, with whom she never worked. Jim said that Bethenny had no friends and that's why she chose a rather odd group of people.
  - In pure Apprentice tradition, the first part of the final task ended with the final two facing conflicts that could lead to failure. In this case, Dawna thinks Howie could cost her the job, and Bethenny with numerous workers who have no tasks.

=== Week 13: Decision Time ===
- Airdate: December 21, 2005
- Setting: The studio in which Martha's daytime show, Martha takes place, live in The Apprentice tradition.
- Pre-Recorded Material: Conclusion of the final tasks
  - Bethenny's circus event was fun and successful, but Bethenny was a bit cold towards her teammates.
    - Bethenny's coldness was especially evident at the end of the task, when she left her teammates without saying much in the way of praise, in stark contrast to Dawna's emotional farewell to her team.
    - Martha was also concerned that Bethenny disregarded her subordinates and had a few rough edges, which jeopardized Bethenny's job application nearing the end of the finale.
  - Dawna's Liz Claiborne fashion show event went smoothly as well
    - The company's main concern was that the event brochures were rushed, after the Liz Claiborne executives made last-minute changes of the clothing-line and the show atmosphere; but ultimately none of Dawna's weaknesses affected her job application.
- Runner-up: Bethenny Frankel, for showing disrespect to her subordinates, being a show-off, and having excessive need to make physical impressions.
- Hired: Dawna Stone, for not only her outstanding PM record of 3-0 & track record of 9–2, but mainly her exemplary business experience and her competency in management. (Martha to Dawna: "I would like to offer you the job of being my apprentice.")
  - Dawna's Job: Development Director for MSLO's Body + Soul magazine, based in the Boston suburb of Watertown, Massachusetts.
- Special notes:
  - The Live Finale was only one hour long (as opposed to two for Donald Trump's Apprentice).
  - At the end of the show, champagne was passed around to the candidates in celebration of Dawna's coronation. However, Martha refused to offer any alcoholic beverage to Dawna herself, since she wanted Dawna to celebrate her coronation driving away in a new Buick Lucerne.

== Television syndication ==
- The Apprentice: Martha Stewart was shown in the United Kingdom on Discovery Home & Health (part of the Discovery Channel Network) Weekdays at 7pm.
