= MCF =

MCF can refer to:

== Transport and manufacturing ==
- Modern Coach Factory, Raebareli, an Indian rail manufacturer

== Science and technology ==
- Military-civil fusion, a Chinese economic strategy for technological dominance developed by Xi Jinping
- Magnetic confinement fusion, an approach to thermonuclear fusion that uses magnetic fields
- Muon-catalyzed fusion, an approach to nuclear fusion that uses muons
- Makes caterpillars floppy, a gene in the bacterium Photorhabdus luminescens
- Malignant catarrhal fever (Bovine malignant catarrhal fever), a disease of cattle and related species
- Master Control Facility, ISRO's communication satellite control centre
- Median cell fragility (Erythrocyte fragility), the NaCl concentration at which 50% of cells in a blood sample undergo lysis
- Methyl chloroform, 1,1,1-Trichloroethane
- Mille cubic feet (Mcf), 1000 cubic feet, unit of volume used in natural gas industry
- Modulation contrast function, a variant of the Optical transfer function, used in optical imaging analysis
- Multi-commodity flow problem, a flow network problem with multiple commodities between different source and sink nodes

== Culture and entertainment ==
- Magic Circle Festival, a German heavy metal music festival
- Málaga CF, a football club based in Málaga, Spain
- Real Madrid CF, a football club based in Madrid, Spain
- Malaysian Chess Federation, organization for chess players in Malaysia

== Business and finance ==
- Mangalore Chemicals & Fertilizers, an Indian fertilizer company
- Marginal cost of funds, an aspect of Excess burden of taxation
- MCF, ISO 4217 code for the Monégasque franc, the former currency of Monaco
- Modern Coach Factory, Raebareli, an Indian rail manufacturer

== Computing ==
- MacCentral Forum (1998-2008), a former on-line forum for Apple Macintosh users
- Meta Content Framework, a discontinued specification of a content format for structuring metadata about web sites
- Modular Crypt Format, a method of storing hashed passwords
- Multimedia Container Format, an unfinished digital media specification which was incorporated into Matroska
- Mystery Case Files, a video game series

== Other ==
- Malaysian Chess Federation, a sport organization in Malaysia
- Marine Commando Force, now MARCOS, the special forces unit of the Indian Navy
- Micro Complement fixation test, a high-sensitivity immunological medical test
- Muskegon Correctional Facility, a state prison in Michigan, United States
- Michael C. Fina, an American luxury-goods retailer
- Melamine faced chipboard, a form of Particle board, an engineered wood product
- Municipal Corporation of Faridabad, the city government of Faridabad, India
- Maître de conférences, a rank in French academia
- Mully Children's Family, a nonprofit organization for children in need
- Muslim Charities Forum, a religious organization based in the United Kingdom
