= Brian Koppelman =

American showrunner (born 1966)

- Born: Brian William Koppelman; April 27, 1966 (age 60); Roslyn Harbor, New York, U.S.
- Education: Tufts University (BA); Fordham University (JD)
- Occupations: Television and film writer, producer and director
- Spouse: Amy Levine
- Children: 2, including Sam
- Parent(s): Brenda "Bunny" Koppelman; Charles Koppelman
- Relatives: Jennifer Koppelman Hutt (sister)

Brian William Koppelman (born April 27, 1966) is an American television and film writer, producer and director. Koppelman is the co-writer of Ocean's Thirteen and Rounders, a producer of films including The Illusionist and The Lucky Ones, the director of films including Solitary Man and the documentary This Is What They Want for ESPN's 30 for 30 series, and the co-creator, showrunner, and executive producer of Showtime's Billions and Super Pumped: The Battle for Uber.

== Early life and education ==
Koppelman was born on April 27, 1966, in Roslyn Harbor, New York, the son of Brenda "Bunny" Koppelman and Charles Koppelman. Koppelman is Jewish. His father was a producer and media executive. Koppelman holds degrees from Tufts University and Fordham University School of Law.

== Career ==
He first started managing local Long Island bands as a teenager. He would also book bands at a local nightclub. Through booking acts, he came into contact with Eddie Murphy and helped arrange Murphy's first record deal. As a student at Tufts University, he discovered singer/songwriter Tracy Chapman and executive-produced her first album. He was later brought to Giant Records by president Irving Azoff. During his career, Koppelman was an A&R representative for music labels Elektra Records, Giant Records, SBK Records and EMI Records.

=== Film ===
In 1997, Koppelman wrote the original screenplay for Rounders with his writing partner, David Levien. Koppelman has described his approach to writing as a team as having only one rule: no video games in the office. In 2001, Koppelman wrote, produced, and directed his first film, Knockaround Guys, which film critic Roger Ebert gave 3 out of 4 stars. Since then, Koppelman has worked on a dozen films, including having written Ocean's Thirteen and directed an ESPN 30 for 30 documentary, This Is What They Want.

In 2009, Koppelman co-directed Solitary Man starring Michael Douglas. The film was included in both A. O. Scott's The New York Times "Year End Best" list, Roger Ebert's "Year End Best" list, and holds a "Fresh" rating of 81% at the review aggregator website Rotten Tomatoes.

=== Other writings and podcasts ===
Koppelman was a contributor and essayist at Grantland.com, a website that was dedicated to sports and pop culture. Additionally, since March 2014, Koppelman has hosted a weekly podcast, "The Moment", on ESPN Radio. In October, 2013, Koppelman received significant media attention for releasing a series of videos on the platform Vine in which he gives screenwriting advice in six seconds or less called "Six Second Screenwriting Lessons". His "Screenwriting, in Six Seconds or Less" Vine from July 31, 2014, generated over 15 million loops in less than nine days. He has also written a short story, "Wednesday is Viktor's", for the anthology Dark City Lights: New York Stories (Have a NYC), published in 2015. Koppelman has a chapter giving advice in Tim Ferriss' book Tools of Titans.

=== Television ===
Showtime's drama Billions, created by Koppelman with The New York Times columnist Andrew Ross Sorkin and writing partner David Levien, and starring Paul Giamatti and Damian Lewis, premiered to strong reviews in 2016. In 2025 Netflix ordered eight episodes of a casino-industry drama set in the 1990s, with Martin Scorsese executive producing and Koppelman and Levien attached as showrunners.

=== Lawsuits ===
Koppelman has been involved in several lawsuits regarding his work, namely Grosso v. Miramax Film Corp., Cayuga Nations v. Showtime Networks Inc., and Shull v. Sorkin. Both Grosso and Shull claimed that Koppelman stole their ideas and copyright work in his creation of Rounders and Billions respectively. All cases have since been dismissed. Shull's case was recently dismissed a second time.

=== Awards and recognition ===
In 2013, Tufts University awarded Koppelman its P.T. Barnum Award for success in Media/Arts. In 2014, Koppelman won an Emmy Award for his 30 for 30 documentary.

== Personal life ==
In 1992, Koppelman married novelist Amy Levine at the Central Synagogue in Manhattan. The couple have two children, including the journalist Sam Koppelman. His sister is Jennifer Koppelman Hutt, who hosts a Sirius Satellite Radio show called Just Jenny. Regarding religion, Koppelman describes himself as culturally Jewish, but from a philosophical standpoint he identifies himself as an atheist. Koppelman is a fan of the Knicks, Jets, and Yankees.

Of his five-year practice of Transcendental Meditation Koppelman said in 2016: "For me it was a way to control anxiety, and I found that the physical manifestations of anxiety just dissipated by about 85 or 90 percent ... So that was a gigantic life change, to not feel a fluttering stomach, to not get a stress headache and things like that."

== Filmography ==
=== Film ===
| Year | Title | Director | Writer | Producer | Notes |
|---|---|---|---|---|---|
| 1998 | Rounders | No | Yes | No | |
| 2001 | Knockaround Guys | Yes | Yes | Yes | Co-directed with David Levien |
| 2002 | Interview with the Assassin | No | No | Yes | |
| 2003 | Runaway Jury | No | Yes | No | |
| 2004 | Walking Tall | No | Yes | No | |
| 2006 | The Illusionist | No | No | Yes | |
| 2007 | Ocean's Thirteen | No | Yes | No | |
| 2007 | The Lucky Ones | No | No | Yes | |
| 2009 | Solitary Man | Yes | Yes | No | Co-directed with David Levien |
| 2009 | The Girlfriend Experience | No | Yes | No | |
| 2013 | Runner Runner | No | Yes | Yes | |
| 2015 | I Smile Back | No | No | Yes | |

=== Television ===
| Year | Title | Director | Writer | Producer | Notes |
|---|---|---|---|---|---|
| 2003 | The Street Lawyer | No | Yes | Yes | TV pilot |
| 2005 | Tilt | Yes | Yes | Yes | Co-creator |
| 2013 | This Is What They Want | Yes | No | No | |
| 2016 | Billions | No | Yes | Executive | Co-creator |
| 2022 | Super Pumped | No | Yes | Executive | Co-creator |

Actor

- Michael Clayton (2007)
- The Bear (2024–2026)

== Bibliography ==
- Koppelman, Brian (2015). "Wednesday is Viktor's". In Block, Lawrence (ed.). Dark city lights : New York stories. New York: Three Rooms Press.
- — (September 20, 2021). "We can make it work". Shouts & Murmurs. The New Yorker. 97 (29): 27.
