= Jennifer Hutt =

American radio and television host, author, and lawyer

Jenny Hutt
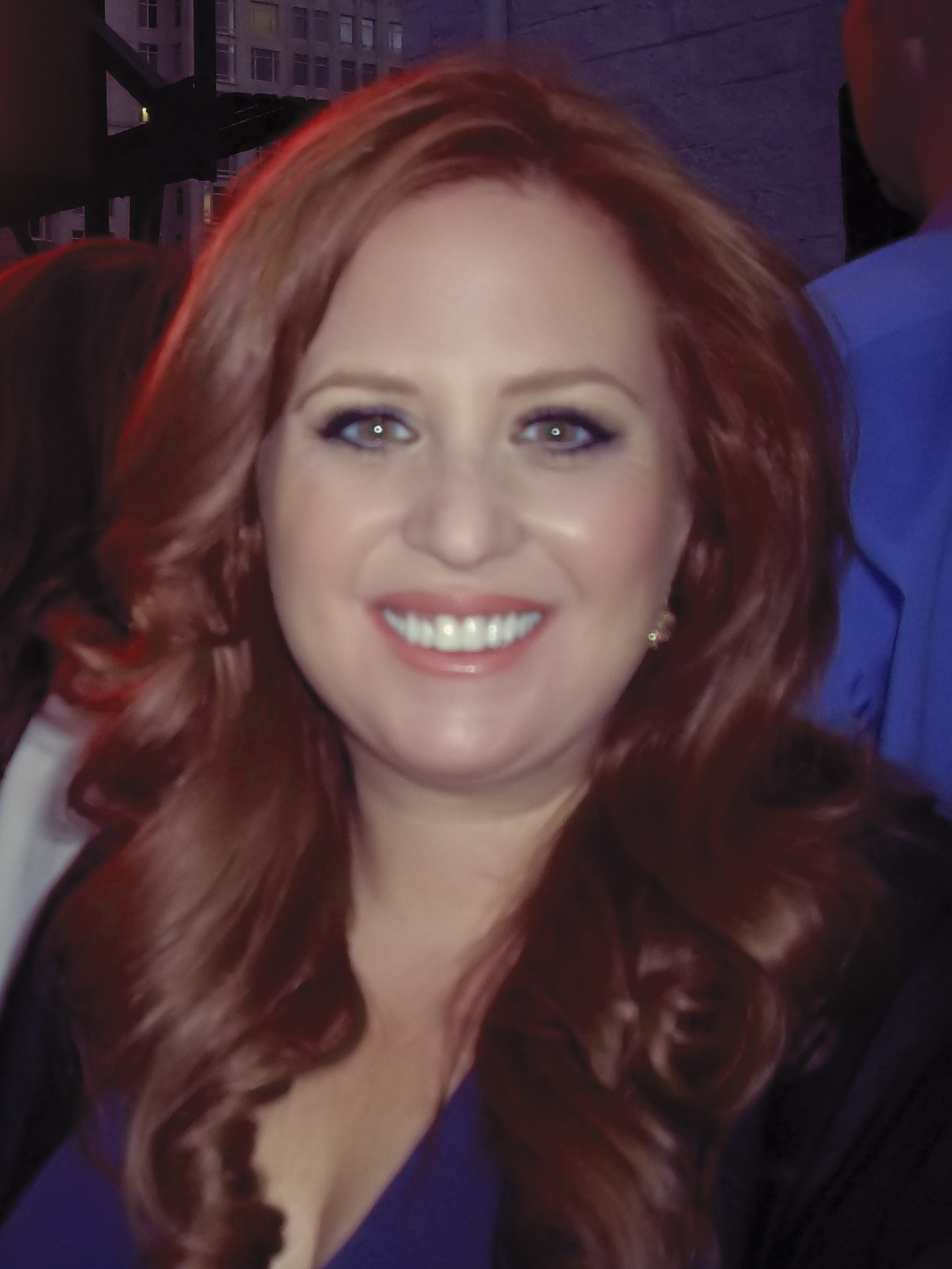
- Born: February 7, 1970 (age 56); Roslyn Harbor, New York
- Occupations: Television host radio host author lawyer
- Children: 2
- Relatives: Brian Koppelman (brother)
- Website: jenniferhutt.com

Jennifer Koppelman Hutt (born on February 7, 1970) is an American radio host, television host, author and lawyer.

== Early life and education ==
Hutt, the daughter of producer and media executive Charles Koppelman and Bunny Koppelman, was born in 1970 in Roslyn Harbor. She holds a baccalaureate degree from Tufts University and a J.D. degree from Hofstra University, and has been a licensed lawyer in the state of New York since 2000.

== Career ==
From 2005 to 2011, Hutt co-hosted Whatever with Alexis and Jennifer, a daily radio talk show on SiriusXM with Alexis Stewart. In September 2010, Whatever with Alexis and Jennifer became an hour-long television program on Hallmark Channel. Since 2012, Hutt has hosted her own radio show on SiriusXM called Just Jenny. In 2010 she began co-hosting the Jon Hein TV Show, also on SiriusXM.

Hutt has appeared on or hosted several television shows including HLN’s Showbiz Tonight, CNN Newsroom with Brooke Baldwin, and CBS's The Talk. For several months in 2013 and 2014, she co-hosted on HLN's Dr. Drew On Call.

In 2011, Hutt co-authored a book titled Whateverland with Alexis Stewart, daughter of Martha Stewart.

== Personal life ==
In 1997, Jennifer married Keith Hutt in New York. Her brother is Brian Koppelman, co-writer of Ocean's Thirteen and Rounders and her sister is Stacy Fritz.
