= Charles Koppelman =

American musician and businessman (1940–2022)

- Born: March 30, 1940; Brooklyn, New York, U.S.
- Died: November 25, 2022 (aged 82); Roslyn Harbor, New York, U.S.
- Occupation: Business executive
- Spouse(s): Brenda "Bunny" Koppelman (died 2008); Gerri Kyhill Koppelman (m. 2011)
- Children: 3, including Brian and Jennifer
- Relatives: Sam Koppelman (grandson)

Charles Koppelman (March 30, 1940 – November 25, 2022) was an American musician, music producer, and businessman. He held executive positions at EMI and Steve Madden, and was chairman of Martha Stewart Living Omnimedia. At the time of his death, he was the CEO of CAK Entertainment.

== Early life ==
Koppelman was born to a Jewish family, the son of Ruth and Irving Koppelman.

In 1921, his uncle Morris Koppelman patented an improved version of the egg carton made from cut, folded and glued cardboard and functions similar to today's egg cartons. The patent emphasized the ability for it to fold flat after use, which is a feature no longer considered important.

== Career ==
Koppelman broke into the music business as a member of the musical group the Ivy Three which had a Top 10 hit in 1960 titled "Yogi", after the cartoon Yogi Bear. Soon, Koppelman and bandmate and future business partner Don Rubin joined the songwriting staff of Aldon Music under CEO Don Kirshner, a group that included Carole King, Neil Sedaka, Barry Mann, and Cynthia Weil. When Columbia Pictures purchased Aldon Music, Koppelman was promoted to director of Screen Gems/Columbia Music, the new company that resulted from the merger. In 1965, with financial backing of his uncle, Leon Koppelman, Koppelman and Rubin left Columbia to form Koppelman/Rubin Associates, an entertainment company that signed the Lovin Spoonful the same year. In 1967, Koppelman/Rubin signed the Little Bits of Sound, a group from Long Island, New York with a psychedelic sound. In 1968, Commonwealth United purchased Koppelman/Rubin Associates and Koppelman and Rubin stayed on to run the music division. In 1968 they signed the psychedelic band the Rahgoos and famously made the band change its name to Gandalf. During the early 1970s, Koppelman moved on to CBS Records and held numerous positions, including Vice President/National Director of A&R where he signed acts including Billy Joel, Dave Mason, Janis Ian, Journey, and Phoebe Snow.

As head of A&R, Koppelman pronounced The Wild, the Innocent & The E Street Shuffle, the second album recorded by Bruce Springsteen in 1973, to be unreleasable. The musicianship, he said, was not good enough. He told Springsteen that if he did not re-record the album with musicians he approved, the company would not promote the album and predicted Springsteen's career would be derailed. According to Springsteen, who refused to change the record he delivered to CBS, not only did the company not promote the album, its representatives told radio stations to remove the recordings from their playlists.

By the mid-1970s, Koppelman had stepped up to Vice President/General Manager of worldwide publishing for CBS Records. In 1975, he formed The Entertainment Company with Martin Bandier and New York real estate developer and Bandier's father-in-law, Samuel LeFrak. The company independently administered and promoted song catalogs and produced music artists like Barbra Streisand, Dolly Parton, Diana Ross, the Four Tops, and Cher.

In the early 1980s, Koppelman's son Brian, then a student at Tufts University in Boston, discovered musician Tracy Chapman and brought her to his father who soon signed her to a record deal.

In 1986, Koppelman, Bandier, and Stephen C. Swid formed SBK Entertainment World, Inc., in order to buy the 250,000 titles owned by CBS Songs for $125 million, the highest price ever paid for a music publishing portfolio. SBK developed into the largest independent music publisher in the world and played a major role in the careers of artists like Michael Bolton, Robbie Robertson, New Kids on the Block, Grayson Hugh, Icehouse, Al B. Sure!, and Eric B. & Rakim.

In 1989, SBK Entertainment World, Inc. was sold to EMI Music for $300 million. As part of the deal, Koppelman and Bandier formed a partnership with EMI Music Worldwide to create their own record label, SBK Records. In addition, Koppelman took the positions of chairman and CEO of the new label and Chairman of EMI Music Publishing. Bandier received the posts of President and Chief Operating Officer of SBK Records and Vice Chairman of EMI Music Publishing. Only one year after SBK Records opened, they received their first platinum album with Technotronic's "Pump Up the Jam". SBK Records went on to sign artists Jesus Jones, Wilson Phillips, Waterfront, and Vanilla Ice, among others. In 1991, Koppelman and Bandier sold their share of SBK Records to EMI Music, making EMI the sole owner of the label. When EMI Music decided to consolidate its operations and formed EMI Records Group North America, Koppelman was subsequently appointed chairman and CEO. During his time at EMI, Koppelman played an integral role in the reunion of singer Frank Sinatra with Capitol Records, which spawned the five-million-selling album Duets. Koppelman served as CEO until 1997.

From 2000 to 2004 Koppelman was Chairman of Steve Madden, Ltd., and led the company while Madden didjail time for securities fraud.

In 2005, Koppelman was appointed Chairman of Martha Stewart Living Omnimedia. Koppelman also appeared as Martha Stewart's right-hand man on NBC's The Apprentice: Martha Stewart in 2005. He was de facto CEO of the company from 2008 to 2011 when he stepped down to expand his company, CAK Entertainment. Since 2010, Koppelman has been a director at Six Flags Entertainment Corporation and sat on the Board of Directors of Las Vegas Sands.

In June 2014, Koppelman was appointed Chairman of Medient Studios Inc., replacing Manu Kumaran.

== CAK Entertainment, Inc. ==
Koppelman founded CAK Entertainment in 1997. Along with general counsel David Fritz and Managing Director Stephanie Roberts, the company conducts marketing, brand development and advisory work for artists and companies including Marc Anthony and Jennifer Lopez (managing their apparel and lifestyle products line with Kohl's Department Stores), Adam Levine and Nicki Minaj (managing their apparel and lifestyle products lines with Kmart), country recording artist Clay Walker, car auctioneer, Barrett-Jackson, Claude Monet Monet's Palate, Martha Stewart Living Omnimedia and Freehand Music.

== Personal life ==
Koppelman was married twice. His first wife was Brenda "Bunny" Koppelman who was also Jewish; they had three children: Brian, Stacy and Jennifer. She died of pancreatic cancer in 2008. On October 29, 2011, he married Gerri Kyhill Koppelman.

His daughter, Jennifer Hutt is a radio personality who has hosted several radio shows including the popular Sirius Satellite Radio show Just Jenny.

His son, Brian Koppelman, is a screenwriter whose credits include Rounders and Ocean's Thirteen.

Koppelman died of cancer on November 25, 2022, at the age of 82.
