= David R. Wrone =

American academic, author and historian (born 1933)

David R. Wrone (born May 15, 1933) is an American academic, author and historian. He is a professor emeritus of history at the University of Wisconsin-Stevens Point and a specialist in the fields of Native American history and political assassinations, writing books and articles on the assassinations of Abraham Lincoln and John F. Kennedy.

== Biography ==
A native of Clinton, Illinois, Wrone graduated from Clinton High School in 1951. He attended the University of Illinois at Urbana–Champaign, earning his bachelor's degree and doctorate in American history. He was a history professor for 35 years at the University of Wisconsin-Stevens Point, and has been professor emeritus since retiring in 1993.

UW-Stevens Point honored Wrone with the "Excellence in Teaching Award" for 1969-1970 and the "Scholar Award" for 1993-1994.

Wrone is on the board of directors of the Assassination Archives and Research Center, an organization founded in 1984 to research and compile records related to political assassinations.

== Career ==
=== Native American history ===
In the course of his academic career, Wrone lectured, researched and wrote about Native American tribes. His research includes the treaty rights of the U.S.-Native American treaties, and on the Menominee nation and Stockbridge-Munsee Community of Wisconsin.

In 1973, he authored the book, Who's The Savage? A Documentary History of the Mistreatment of the Native North Americans.

At UW-Stevens Point, Wrone helped introduce Menominee language courses, the first instruction of the language at any university.

=== Study of JFK assassination ===
Wrone has devoted more than 40 years to researching the assassination of John F. Kennedy. He is a frequent author of book reviews on the assassination, and edited The Legal Proceedings of Harold Weisberg v. General Services Administration (1975), the court record on the lawsuit to obtain the executive session transcripts of the Warren Commission from January 20, 1964 and January 27, 1964. Wrone sued the United States government for records of Abraham Zapruder's 26-second film of Kennedy's assassination, in particular records relating to its acquisition and purchase.

Wrone taught a course on the subject at UW-Stevens Point, and in 1993 published the book, The Zapruder Film: Reframing JFK's Assassination, an in-depth analysis of the film. According to Wrone, the film proves that there was more than one gunman firing at Kennedy's motorcade. He was a research consultant and interviewee for the 1988 documentary Reasonable Doubt: The Single-Bullet Theory and the Assassination of John F. Kennedy.

He is a frequent critic of the Warren Commission and its subsequent report, which he believes was padded with useless information. Wrone said in 2013, “When you go through those 912 pages, you'll find that it tells you Lee Harvey Oswald in 1941 had a dog called 'Sunshine' and that his aunt worked in 1929 in Woolworths dime store in New Orleans. It also tells you that John Quincy Adams, President of the United States, liked to skinny dip in the Potomac River, and that President Chet Arthur liked to ride the streetcars. It also tells you many other interesting things that had no relationship whatsoever to the murder of President John F. Kennedy.”

Wrone has commented on Oliver Stone's 1991 film JFK by stating: "The film fails on logic, fails on fact." He described Stone's premise of a conspiracy involving the Central Intelligence Agency and a so-called military-industrial complex as "irrational". According to Wrone, other assassination films, including Executive Action and Interview with the Assassin, are "the commercial exploitation of a great tragedy". Regarding the latter film, he said: "The facts in Interview with the Assassin were so egregiously in error, I had to stop watching it."

He is one of several academic critics of Gerald Posner's well-known JFK assassination book Case Closed (1993), which Wrone blames for "massive numbers of factual errors" as well as off-base speculation. He also criticized pundit Bill O'Reilly's 2012 book, Killing Kennedy: The End of Camelot, calling it "one atrocious book."

=== The Zapruder Film ===
Wrone's 2003 book, The Zapruder Film: Reframing JFK's Assassination, provides a frame-by-frame analysis of Abraham Zapruder's 26-second film of Kennedy's assassination and various aspects of the film's history. The book also outlines Wrone's argument that shots were fired at Kennedy from three different angles, with none of them originating from Lee Harvey Oswald's position on the sixth floor of the Texas School Book Depository.

Addressing the issue that some believe the film to be a forgery, Michael L. Kurtz wrote that "...Wrone's lengthy and exhaustive study of the history of the Zapruder film argues persuasively for its authenticity." Reviewing the book for CNN, L.D. Meagher wrote: "Wrone writes carefully, building his analysis brick by brick. His prose is academic, which may be off-putting to the casual reader. But his research is quite thorough and his conclusions are compelling." A review in Publishers Weekly stated: "While Wrone's exhaustive consideration of the film itself quickly becomes tedious, he provides a few chapters that tell some intriguing stories" and "[a]side from these anecdotes, however, there is nothing new here, just reiteration of the scathing criticisms of the Warren Commission's conclusions." According to Kermit L. Hall: "The book treats what might be thought the perfect piece of evidence with far too much authority. What the Zapruder footage shows is that a man was killed before our eyes, but Wrone's efforts to determine the origin of the shots is, in the end, frustrating and ultimately problematical."

== Selected publications ==
- Newspapers of DeWitt County, 1854-1960: A Bibliography and Checklist. Springfield: Illinois State Library. OCLC 18688737.
- "The Assassination of John Fitzgerald Kennedy: An Annotated Bibliography." The Wisconsin Magazine of History, vol. 56, no. 1 (Autumn 1972), pp. 21–36. JSTOR 4634762.
- Who's The Savage? A Documentary History of the Mistreatment of the Native North Americans, with Russell S. Nelson. Fawcett (1973).
- The Freedom of Information Act and Political Assassination: The Legal Proceedings of Harold Weisberg v. General Services Administration. Steven's Point, Wis.: Foundation Press (1978). ISBN 978-0932310002.
- "Lincoln: Democracy's Touchstone." Journal of the Abraham Lincoln Association, vol. 1, no. 1 (1979), pp. 71-83.
- The Assassination of John F. Kennedy: A Comprehensive Historical and Legal Bibliography, 1963-1979. Westport, Conn.: Greenwood Press (1980). ISBN 0313212740.
- Two Assassinations: Abraham Lincoln and John F. Kennedy. Lincoln Fellowship of Wisconsin, 37th Meeting, Madison (1980).
- Introduction to The HSCA, the Zapruder Film, and the Single-Bullet Theory, by Raymond Marcus (1992), pp. i-iii.
- The Zapruder Film: Reframing the JFK Assassination. Lawrence, Kan.: University Press of Kansas (2003). ISBN 0700612912.
