= City of the Sun (Levien novel) =

2008 novel by David Levien

- Author: David Levien
- Language: English
- Genre: Crime, Suspense
- Publisher: Doubleday
- Publication date: 2008
- Publication place: United States
- Media type: Print (hardback & paperback)
- Pages: 320 (first edition, hardback)
- ISBN: 978-0-385-52366-0 (first edition, hardback)
- OCLC: 155755911
- Dewey Decimal: 813/.54 22
- LC Class: PS3562.E8887 C58 2008

City of the Sun is a 2008 crime/suspense novel by David Levien, published by Doubleday. An audiobook release, read by Scott Brick, was released that same year. Levien is currently working on a film script for the book.

== Plot summary ==
A 14-year-old boy is kidnapped on his usual newspaper round. His parents' relationship suffers through the unknowing of their child's fate. A former police officer, who lost his own son at a young age and who has issues with the police hierarchy, accepts the case.
