= Books: Feed Your Head =

Books: Feed Your Head was a campaign to promote reading aired by MTV in 1991. It consisted of a series of three 60 second PSA's in which contemporary actors read out snippets of literary works in order to entice the MTV audience into reading books. They were produced by Propaganda Films in conjunction with MTV.

The series was created and directed by Neil Burger and starred Sherilyn Fenn, Aidan Quinn and Timothy Hutton. Burger has stated the chosen actors reflected his 'edgy' sensibility. According to Abby Terkuhle, MTV's vice president, MTV were concerned that people are not reading as much as they should and could be. MTV therefore decided to cultivate interest in literacy by bringing to life some famous literary works. Terkuhle also states that it fits in with MTV's overall pro-social direction. "We've had public service campaigns on the environment, racism, literacy and registering to vote." Burger adds that the spots do not address illiteracy but aliteracy: "They're aimed at people who know how to read [but] who don't because they're too busy or they think that reading is boring. The idea behind the spots is that reading is as cool or as entertaining or as sexy or as fun or as weird or scary or whatever as their favorite TV show or favorite rock band."

== The promotional spots ==
Sherilyn Fenn (Twin Peaks) appeared in the most playful and risqué of the three scenarios, reading from Anaïs Nin's collection of erotica entitled Delta of Venus. A nervous Fenn here reads a naughty story to her older husband (?) in an effort to distract him, while her young lover slips out the bedroom window.

Aidan Quinn (Desperately Seeking Susan) recites the opening passages from Franz Kafka's The Metamorphosis as the camera follows him down a claustrophobic corridor. Behind a closed door the story's protagonist, Gregor, now a man-size cockroach, helplessly flails his spindly collection of legs.

Timothy Hutton (The Falcon and the Snowman) stars in the black-and-white spot for Chablis; a Donald Barthelme short story (featured in his Forty Stories collection) about an alcoholic. While flipping burgers for what seems to be a family BBQ he tells the tale of his loveless marriage and young child that will only acknowledge her mama.
