= Sam Koppelman =

American entrepreneur, author, and journalist

- Education: Harvard University (AB)
- Occupation: Journalist
- Known for: Mayday Health; Hunterbrook
- Parents: Brian Koppelman (father); Amy Koppelman (mother)
- Relatives: Charles Koppelman (grandfather)

Sam Hunter Koppelman is an American entrepreneur, author, speechwriter, and journalist. He is the co-founder of Mayday Health and Hunterbrook.

== Early life and education ==
Koppelman was born in New York City to television writer Brian Koppelman and author Amy Koppelman. He graduated from the Ethical Culture Fieldston School before attending Harvard University, where he obtained a degree in government in 2018.

== Career ==
After graduating from Harvard, Koppelman wrote speeches for Michael Bloomberg and worked full-time for Fenway Strategies, a communications firm founded by Jon Favreau that Koppelman joined while he was still a student. While at Fenway, Koppelman also co-wrote books with former U.S. attorney general Eric Holder and former U.S. solicitor general Neal Katyal including a New York Times bestseller. He worked for Joe Biden's 2020 campaign as a speechwriter. During the COVID-19 pandemic he wrote the newsletter Cooking in Quarantine before founding Mayday Health and Hunterbrook.

=== Mayday Health ===
After the Supreme Court's decision in Dobbs v. Jackson, Koppelman founded Mayday Health along with Leo Raisner and Nathaniel Horwitz, whom he met at The Harvard Crimson. The nonprofit provides information on abortion access in the United States.

=== Hunterbrook ===
In 2023, Koppelman and Horwitz co-founded Hunterbrook, an investigative journalism outlet and hedge fund. The newsroom's first investigation focused on alleged fraud at United Wholesale Mortgage. In September 2025, Koppelman appeared on Pablo Torre Finds Out and launched a podcast on Hunterbrook's investigations with Caroline Calloway.

== Personal life ==
Koppelman lives in the East Village. Koppelman previously dated actress Maude Apatow.

In 2014, correspondence leaked from the Sony Pictures hack revealed that Sony CEO Michael Lynton, then serving on the Harvard Board of Overseers, and Koppelman had discussed Koppelman's Harvard application, along with a letter of recommendation written by actor Matt Damon.
