= Mayday Health =

American organization to educate on abortion

- Formation: 2022
- Founders: Leo Raisner; Sam Koppelman; Nathaniel Horwitz
- Type: non-profit organization
- Headquarters: Massachusetts
- Website: www.mayday.health

Mayday Health is a 501(c)(3) non-profit organization that provides education about medication abortion and how to access it in the United States. It was founded in 2022 by Leo Raisner, Nathaniel Horwitz, and Sam Koppelman in response to the Dobbs v. Jackson (2022) court decision that limited access to abortion in many U.S. states. Mayday does not sell or distribute abortion pills. It was founded after the leak of the Dobbs v. Jackson decision that overturned Roe v. Wade (1973) and Planned Parenthood v. Casey (1992). The organization launched on the day of the Dobbs decision.

== Tactics ==
Mayday uses guerrilla tactics to raise awareness about abortion pills, in a break from traditional organizations like Planned Parenthood.

Mayday advocated in Massachusetts for a law to shield healthcare providers who mail abortion pills to patients in other states.

The mayday.health website is written at a fifth grade reading level. It is available in multiple languages. It does not track data from visitors.

In December 2022, Mayday published an undercover video filmed inside crisis pregnancy centers, arguing that the centers share false information with women seeking abortion.

During Women's History Month in March 2023, Mayday drove mobile billboards through 14 states with restrictions on abortion.

In June 2023, Mayday opened a pop-up "abortion store" art installation in Bastrop, Texas to show that free speech can be used to talk about access to abortion pills, even in ban states.

In August 2024, Mayday purchased 4 billboards in San Antonio, Texas that displayed the message: “Everything’s bigger in Texas: including our infant mortality rate.” The stated goal of the billboards was to raise public awareness of a new study published by Johns Hopkins Bloomberg School of Public Health indicating that the infant mortality rate rose 8% in Texas in the year after the Texas Heartbeat Act abortion ban was adopted in September 2021 while the rest of the country experienced a 2% increase. The researchers also found that the number of infants that died of birth defects in Texas increased by 23%, while the number decreased by 3% in the rest of the country.

In April 2025, Mayday drove a digital billboard truck across Tennessee, making stops at crisis pregnancy centers, and put up posters across Nashville, Dickson and Fairview. The following month, Mayday arranged for a plane to fly over Indianapolis Motor Speedway on May 23, May 24 and during the Indy 500 on May 25 carrying a banner with the message “Abortion pills by mail," emphasizing that Hoosiers can still get abortion pills by mail.

In June 2025, to mark three years since the Dobbs v. Jackson decision, Mayday took out ads in the hometown newspapers of each of the five Supreme Court justices who struck down Roe v. Wade.

== Social media ==
Mayday reached millions of people within 48 hours of its launch using viral infographics about how to access safe abortion pills by mail, starting with zero followers the day of the Dobbs v. Jackson decision.

Mayday has criticized Facebook and Instagram for restricting access to their platforms for health education information. When Spotify blocked Mayday ads about abortion pills, Mayday released a 119 hour "Spotify Rapist Playlist" of sexual predators hosted by the platform to pressure Spotify for policy changes.

== Legal disputes ==
In July 2022, Mayday put up three billboards in Jackson, Mississippi, that read: "Pregnant? You still have a choice."

Mayday received a subpoena from the state of Mississippi. Mayday rejected the subpoena, citing censorship of free speech. Mayday put up 20 additional billboards and ran a television ad in Mississippi.

Mayday was represented pro bono by the litigation firms Hogan Lovells, Davis Wright Tremaine and Morgan, Lewis & Bockius.

In October 2022, the University of Idaho advised students and professors to avoid speaking about abortion pills or contraception. Mayday ran a mobile billboard in Idaho with the same message as Mississippi.

In April 2023, the district court ruling in Alliance for Hippocratic Medicine v. FDA (2023) against approval of mifepristone referenced Mayday as a new organization that "focuses on those who live in states with abortion bans, giving users step-by-step instructions on how to set up temporary addresses in an abortion permissive state and forward the mail into the banned state." The Supreme Court of the United States unanimously ruled against the Alliance, reversing lower court decisions and restoring mifepristone's availability under current FDA rules.

In May 2026, Mayday Health and former South Dakota state legislator Nancy Turbak Berry sued Governor Larry Rhoden and Attorney General Marty Jackley, challenging a state law restricting the advertising of abortion pills on First Amendment grounds. In July 2026, a federal district court granted a preliminary injunction barring enforcement of the law against Mayday and Turbak Berry while the case proceeds, finding that they were likely to succeed on the merits of their First Amendment claim. The defendants appealed the ruling, and in September 2026 the district court denied their request to stay the preliminary injunction pending appeal.

== Leadership ==
In January 2023, Jennifer Lincoln, an OB/GYN and social media influencer, became Executive Director of Mayday. In January 2024, co-founder Leo Raisner transitioned to the role and Dr. Lincoln moved to the Board of Directors alongside co-founder and board chairman Nathaniel Horwitz.

== See also ==
- Dobbs v. Jackson – 2022 U.S. Supreme Court case on abortion
- Roe v. Wade – 1973 US Supreme Court decision on abortion, overruled 2022
- Planned Parenthood – US nonprofit reproductive health services organization
- Plan C – Non-profit medication abortion information provider
