= David Levien =

American screenwriter, director, producer, and novelist

- Born: December 9, 1967 (age 58); Great Neck, New York, United States
- Education: B.A., University of Michigan
- Occupations: Screenwriter, novelist, director, producer
- Spouse: Melissa Sandler Levien
- Children: 3
- Writing career
- Genres: Fiction, suspense
- Notable works: Billions, Rounders, Solitary Man

David Levien (born December 9, 1967) is an American screenwriter, director, producer, and novelist. He is co-creator, executive producer, and showrunner of Showtime's Billions, along with Brian Koppelman. Some of his credits include Ocean's Thirteen, Rounders, Solitary Man, The Illusionist, Runaway Jury, Tilt, and ESPN's 30 for 30 (This Is What They Want) for which he won a sports Emmy.

Levien is also the author of six novels, including four in the Frank Behr series. Some of his earlier works were published under D.J. Levien.

== Early life and education ==
Levien was born in Great Neck, New York. He met his lifelong writing partner and friend, Brian Koppelman, on a summer bus trip for teens when Levien was 14 years old. Levien is Jewish. He is a graduate of the University of Michigan. After school he moved to Los Angeles where he worked as a story editor for various agencies and production companies. Finding that editing the stories of the others impacted his writing, he quit and moved to Paris and then Argentina where he trained horses before returning to New York City where he reunited with Koppelman.

== Career ==
=== Film ===
In 1997, Levien wrote the original screenplay for Rounders with his writing partner, Brian Koppelman. In 2001, Levien and Koppelman wrote, produced, and directed the film Knockaround Guys, which film critic Roger Ebert gave 3 out of 4 stars. Levien and Koppelman also co-wrote the 2003 film Runaway Jury, which was nominated for the Edgar Award for Best Screenplay. In 2009, Levien and Koppelman co-directed Solitary Man starring Michael Douglas. The film was included in both A.O. Scott's The New York Times "Year End Best" list and Roger Ebert's "Year End Best" list. Other film credits include the third installment in the Ocean's franchise, 2007's Ocean's Thirteen, directed by Steven Soderbergh.

=== Novels ===
Levien has published six novels, including the literary novels Wormwood, Swagbelly, and the Frank Behr crime series, set in the Midwest and chronicling the fictional private investigator. The series includes City of the Sun, Where the Dead Lay, 13 Million Dollar Pop, and Signature Kill. The Behr books were nominated for the Hammett, Barry and Shamus awards. Sons of Spade named 13 Million Dollar Pop the best P.I. novel of 2011.

=== Short stories ===
In 2015, Levien published the short story "Knock Out Whist," which was nominated by Best American Mystery Stories 2016 as an honorable mention. His story "Einstein's Sabbath" was published in The Darkling Halls of Ivy anthology in 2020.

=== Television ===
Showtime's drama series, Billions, created by David Levien, Brian Koppelman, and Andrew Ross Sorkin, and starring Paul Giamatti and Damian Lewis, premiered in 2016.

== Filmography ==
=== Films ===
Year	Title	Director	Writer	Producer	Notes
1998	Rounders	No	Yes	No	Co-written with Brian Koppelman
2001	Knockaround Guys	Yes	Yes	Yes	Co-directed with Brian Koppelman
2003	Runaway Jury	No	Yes	No	Co-written with Brian Koppelman
2004	Walking Tall	No	Yes	No	
2007	Ocean's Thirteen	No	Yes	No	Co-Written with Brian Koppelman
2009	Solitary Man	Yes	No	No	Co-directed with Brian Koppelman
2009	The Girlfriend Experience	No	Yes	No	
2013	Runner Runner	No	Yes	Yes	

Producer only

- Interview with the Assassin (2002)
- The Illusionist (2006)
- The Lucky Ones (2007)
- I Smile Back (2015)

=== Television ===
Year	Title	Director	Writer	Producer	Notes
2003	The Street Lawyer	No	Yes	Yes	TV pilot
2005	Tilt	Yes	Yes	Yes	Co-creator
2016	Billions	No	Yes	Executive	Co-creator
2022	Super Pumped	No	Yes	Executive	Co-creator

== Novels ==
=== Frank Behr novels ===
- City of the Sun (2008)
- Where the Dead Lay (2009)
- Thirteen Million Dollar Pop (2011); released as The Contract outside the US (2012)
- Signature Kill (2014)

=== Standalone novels ===
- Wormwood (1999)
- Swagbelly: A Novel for Today's Gentleman (2003)

=== Short stories ===
- "Knock-out Whist" (2015)
- "Einstein's Sabbath" (2020)
