= Solitary Man (film) =

- Theatrical release poster
- Directed by: Brian Koppelman; David Levien
- Written by: Brian Koppelman
- Produced by: Moshe Diamant; Danny Dimbort; Joe Gatta; Jared Ian Goldman; Steven Soderbergh
- Starring: Michael Douglas; Jenna Fischer; Jesse Eisenberg; Mary-Louise Parker; Imogen Poots; Susan Sarandon; Danny DeVito
- Cinematography: Alwin H. Küchler
- Edited by: Tricia Cooke
- Music by: Michael Penn
- Distributed by: Millennium Films; Smartest Man Productions
- Release dates: September 2009 (TIFF); May 7, 2010 (United States)
- Running time: 90 minutes
- Country: United States
- Language: English
- Budget: $15 million
- Box office: $5.6 million

Solitary Man is a 2009 American comedy-drama film co-directed by Brian Koppelman and David Levien. The film stars Michael Douglas, Susan Sarandon, Jenna Fischer, Jesse Eisenberg, Mary-Louise Parker, and Danny DeVito. The film received generally positive reviews, though it grossed just $5.6 million against its $15 million budget.

== Plot ==
The film opens with 54-year-old Ben Kalmen (Michael Douglas), a very successful car dealer in the New York area, at his annual medical check-up; his doctor tells him he needs a CAT scan to get a better look at his heart, due to an "irregularity" in his EKG.

About six years later, Ben's fortunes have drastically changed. He is taking oral medications but never got the prescribed heart tests, and his lost sense of "immortality" has sent him on a self-destructive binge: habitual lying, illicit sexual affairs, divorce, and bad business decisions that nearly put him in prison. Ben is broke, borrowing money from his daughter Susan (Jenna Fischer), still unwilling to accept his age, ignoring his heart problem, and has a serial sexual appetite.

Ben, who cheated often on his wife Nancy Kalmen (Susan Sarandon), accompanies Allyson (Imogen Poots), the 18-year-old daughter of his girlfriend, Jordon Karsch (Mary-Louise Parker), to her college interview at a Boston college campus where Ben is an alumnus, having been a prominent donor during his more prosperous days. On campus, Ben meets an impressionable student named Daniel (Jesse Eisenberg) who appreciates his wisdom and advice. Later that night, Ben and Allyson sleep together.

Back in New York, Ben expresses a desire to continue the relationship, which Allyson dismisses as a one time experiment with an older man, in her words, crossing "the Daddy" fantasy off her "list". Frustrated with Ben and her own mother, Allyson dismissively tells her mother about the sexual encounter. Jordon is incensed and breaks off contact with Ben. She then withdraws the support Ben needs to open a new auto dealership. While he is discussing his overdue rent with his building manager (Lenny Venito), Susan appears and tells him he is no longer welcome in her family's life, citing a previous sexual encounter he had with one of her friends and his unreliability as a grandfather of her son.

Facing eviction, Ben asks his college friend Jimmy Marino (Danny DeVito) to give him a job at his campus diner. Allyson, now a student, discovers Ben working near her. Ben receives a call from Jordon demanding he leave town immediately, threatening to resort to physical force via Allyson's father's connections. At a college party cruising, Ben recognizes a customer from the diner, then makes a sexual advance toward Daniel's new girlfriend, Maureen (Olivia Thirlby). Shortly after the girl rebuffs him, he is severely beaten by an ex-police officer (Arthur J. Nascarella) sent by Allyson's father.

After discussing his view of life with Jimmy, Ben collapses and wakes up in a hospital with Susan at his bedside. Ben then leaves the hospital against medical advice. He apologizes to Daniel and discovers Nancy on the bench where they met. Nancy has learned of Ben's medical condition and appears to struggle with the fact that his illness has caused his self-destructive behavior. Ben tells Nancy that aging and the prospect of dying caused him to feel "invisible", so he decided to plunge into life with full gusto. She tells him that's no excuse, but understands and offers him a ride back to the city. The film ends with Nancy waiting in the car for his decision and a young woman walking by Ben, still sitting on the bench, in the opposite direction. Ben looks one way at Nancy, then the other way at the woman. The film ends with Ben standing and looking into the camera.

== Cast ==
- Michael Douglas as Ben Kalmen
- Mary-Louise Parker as Jordon Karsch
- Jenna Fischer as Susan Porter
- Imogen Poots as Allyson Karsch
- Susan Sarandon as Nancy Kalmen
- Danny DeVito as Jimmy Marino
- Jesse Eisenberg as Daniel Cheston
- Ben Shenkman as Peter Hartofilias
- David Costabile as Gary Porter
- Richard Schiff as Steve Heller
- Bruce Altman as Dr. Steinberg
- Olivia Thirlby as Maureen (uncredited)
- Arthur J. Nascarella as Nascarella
- Lenny Venito as Todd The Building Manager
- Douglas McGrath as Dean Edward Giletson
- Gillian Jacobs as Tall Girl

== Reception ==
As of January 2023, the film holds a 78% approval rating on the review aggregator website Rotten Tomatoes, based on 100 reviews, with an average rating of 6.80/10. The website's critics consensus reads: "Built around a singularly unpleasant main character, Solitary Man needed a flawless central performance to succeed -- and Michael Douglas delivers." Metacritic, which uses a weighted average, assigned the film a score of 69 out of 100, based on 31 critics, indicating "generally favorable" reviews. "Here is one of Michael Douglas' finest performances", wrote Roger Ebert of the Chicago Sun-Times and called it "a smart, effective film."

== Box office ==
Solitary Man has grossed $4,360,548 at the domestic box office and a worldwide total of $5,682,073.
