= Neil Burger =

American filmmaker

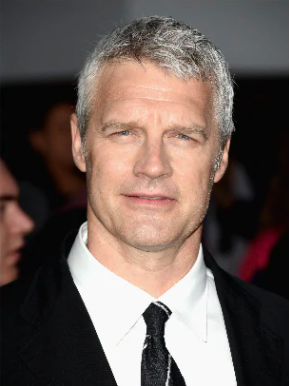
- Burger in June 2015
- Born: Neil Norman Burger; Greenwich, Connecticut, United States
- Occupations: Film director, writer, producer
- Years active: 1987-present
- Notable work: Interview with the Assassin, The Illusionist, Limitless, Divergent
- Spouse: Diana Warner Kellogg (m. 1997)

Neil Norman Burger is an American filmmaker. He is known for the fake-documentary Interview with the Assassin (2002), the period drama The Illusionist (2006), Limitless (2011), and the sci-fi action film Divergent (2014).

== Life and career ==
Burger was born in Greenwich, Connecticut. After graduating from Yale University with a degree in fine arts, he became involved with experimental film in the late 1980s and went on to direct music videos for such alternative artists as the Meat Puppets. He approached MTV about creating and directing a series of inspiring promotional announcements for what would be the MTV Books: Feed Your Head campaign against aliteracy. In association with Ridley Scott Associates, he directed commercials for companies including Mastercard, IBM and ESPN, and created a series of television spots for Amnesty International and their campaign for prisoners of conscience.

Burger made his directorial feature debut with Interview with the Assassin in 2002, which he also wrote. It won the Best Feature Film category at the Woodstock Film Festival and Avignon Film Festival, and was nominated for three Independent Spirit Awards, including Best First Film and Best First Screenplay.

Burger’s follow up feature was The Illusionist, starring Edward Norton and Paul Giamatti. His screenplay for the film was based on the short story "Eisenheim the Illusionist" by Steven Millhauser. It premiered at the 2006 Sundance Film Festival and opened the 2006 Seattle International Film Festival and the 2007 Deauville Film Festival. It was nominated for Best Screenplay at the 2007 Independent Spirit Awards and Best Cinematography at the 2007 Academy Awards.

Burger's additional credits include the 2007 post-Iraq War indie drama The Lucky Ones, starring Rachel McAdams, Tim Robbins, and Michael Peña; and Limitless (2011), starring Bradley Cooper and Robert De Niro, which opened at #1 at the box office and grossed over $160 million worldwide.

In 2014, Burger directed the film Divergent, based on the novel by Veronica Roth. Shailene Woodley starred alongside Theo James, Kate Winslet, Miles Teller, Ansel Elgort and Ashley Judd. Released by Lionsgate, it grossed over $280 million worldwide, making it Burger's most commercially successful film to date.

Following Divergent, Burger directed the first two episodes of Showtime’s Wall Street drama Billions, starring Paul Giamatti and Damian Lewis. He then served as an executive producer on CBS’s TV adaptation of Limitless. His additional credits include the Divergent series films Insurgent (2015) and Allegiant (2016).

Burger most recently directed The Upside, a remake of the French hit The Intouchables. Starring Bryan Cranston and Kevin Hart, it was theatrically released in January 2019.

Burger currently resides in New York City with his wife, architect Diana Kellogg, and their family.

== Filmography ==
=== Film ===
Year	Title	Director	Writer	Producer
2002	Interview with the Assassin	Yes	Yes	No
2006	The Illusionist	Yes	Yes	No
2008	The Lucky Ones	Yes	Yes	Yes
2011	Limitless	Yes	No	Executive
2014	Divergent	Yes	No	No
2017	The Upside	Yes	No	No
2021	Voyagers	Yes	Yes	Yes
2023	The Marsh King's Daughter	Yes	No	No
2025	Inheritance	Yes	Yes	Yes
TBA	Barracuda	Yes	No	No

Executive producer only

- The Divergent Series: Insurgent (2015)
- The Divergent Series: Allegiant (2016)
- All the Old Knives (2022)

=== Television ===
Year	Title	Director	Executive Producer	Notes
1991	Books: Feed Your Head	Yes	No	Miniseries
2015-2016	Limitless	No	Yes	
2016-2023	Billions	Yes	Yes	Directed 6 episodes
2025–present	The Agency	Yes	No	6 episodes
2025	Motorheads	Yes	Yes	2 episodes

TV movies

- The Asset (2012)
- The Jury (2016)
