= Hunterbrook =

American news outlet and investment firm

- Available in: English
- Headquarters: New York City
- Country of origin: United States
- Founders: Sam Koppelman; Nathaniel Horwitz
- CEO: Nathaniel Horwitz
- Key people: Fitzann Reid (General Counsel)
- Industry: Journalism
- Website: https://hntrbrk.com/
- Launched: 2024

Hunterbrook is an investigative news outlet and investment firm. It was founded by Sam Koppelman and Nathaniel Horwitz in 2023. Hunterbrook monetizes its reporting through financial trading and litigation.

The company established a newsroom, Hunterbrook Media, and an investment firm, Hunterbrook Capital. It also created a litigation business to partner with law firms on cases enabled by the newsroom's reporting.

Hunterbrook reporters conduct investigative research on companies. Prior to articles being published, Hunterbook Capital uses the research to place financial bets, often through short-selling, against the companies being investigated. Prominent examples of targeted companies include Dexcom, Ubiquiti and UWM.

== Organisation ==
Hunterbrook has the following affiliated parts:

- Hunterbrook Media - the organisations newsroom, which investigates companies using information it acquires.
- Hunterbrook Capital - an investment firm that trades based on the newsrooms reporting. It launched in 2023 and raised $100 million USD in April 2024.

Hunterbrook Capital pays for exclusive access to the newsroom's research. The group claims that neither entity provides investment advice, and that it discloses the positions the fund takes. Sam Koppelman is the editor for the newsroom's reporting.

The head of open-source intelligence is led by Blake Spendley, who formerly led investigations for the Center for Naval Analyses. Spendley operates the X account OSINTTechnical, which distributes Hunterbrook Media content.

== History ==
Hunterbrook was launched in 2024 by Koppelman, Horwitz, Fitzann Reid, and Emily Pate. Koppelman and Horwitz met at The Harvard Crimson, the undergraduate newspaper of Harvard University, and founded the 501(c)(3) non-profit organization Mayday Health before starting Hunterbrook.

The company's name is a portmanteau of Koppelman's middle name, Hunter, after the investigative journalist Hunter S. Thompson, and the last name of Horwitz's mother, the author and war journalist Geraldine Brooks.

Hunterbrook received $10 million in seed funding from David Fialkow, Peter Kolchinsky, Marc Lasry, and Emerson Collective in 2023. In 2025, it raised additional capital from the Ford Foundation and other investors at a $100 million valuation, double that of the seed round. Its board of advisors includes Paul Steiger, William Cohan, Daniel Okrent, Bethany McLean, and Matt Murray.

Hunterbrook has a unique arrangement, in which Hunterbrook Capital trades based on Hunterbrook Media's reporting. Hunterbrook Capital "takes both long and short positions on equities, plus invests in other asset classes like commodities and derivatives." Hunterbrook Capital launched in 2023, then raised $100 million in April 2024. To avoid regulatory issues, Hunterbrook Media does not rely on inside sources for reporting that Hunterbrook Capital trades on, and discloses positions at the fund related to articles. The Financial Times reported that Hunterbrook's fund generated a 16 per cent return during the first half of 2025.

Hunterbrook's first investigation focused on alleged fraud at United Wholesale Mortgage. Based on the same data identified by Hunterbrook, the Ohio Attorney General sued UWM, which also faces a national class action RICO lawsuit by Boies Schiller Flexner on behalf of homebuyers. UWM described the lawsuit as a "sham" and accused Hunterbrook of being behind it.

RV owners sued Winnebago Industries in a class action after Hunterbrook exposed a product defect. Winnebago called Hunterbrook's claims "baseless."

Hunterbrook compiled a report with the International Partnership for Human Rights and the Independent Anti-Corruption Commission revealing that components used to make Russian weaponry and used in attacks against Ukraine originate from American companies.

On June 21, 2025 Hunterbrook broke the news that B-2 stealth bombers had launched from an Air Force base in Missouri, indicating the US would join Israel’s bombardment of Iran.

Teradyne gained 6% when Hunterbrook's news room reported the company supplies robotic arms to Amazon and the fund disclosed a long position, the same day Goldman Sachs began coverage of the company with a 'Sell' rating. Later that month Teradyne gained 20% on earnings.

Dexcom fell 10% when Hunterbrook's news room alleged problems with the company's continuous glucose monitor and the fund disclosed a short position.

After the Trump Administration targeted a Federal Reserve governor and other political opponents for allegedly having more than one primary residence on their mortgage paperwork, ProPublica reported three Cabinet members have primary-residence mortgages on at least two properties according to real estate records and mortgage data from Hunterbrook.

== Reception and scrutiny ==
Hunterbrook's business model has attracted scrutiny. The Nieman Foundation for Journalism called Hunterbrook "one of the most unusual experiments in media ethics." It also said Hunterbrook's "reporting seems very strong, of the same caliber as what you'd find in top national business news outlets." Critics have argued that blurring the lines between reporting and revenue generation potentially violates longstanding journalistic norms.

In May 2024, Hunterbrook generated controversy after Semafor reported that Koppelman had invested in ZBiotics, which Semafor called a competitor to anti-hangover drink Safety Shot, the subject of a Hunterbrook investigation. Koppelman and the founder of ZBiotics argued that Safety Shot was not a competitor. The FDA investigated Safety Shot whose stock fell more than 50% after the company pivoted to buying a meme coin called Bonk.

The Bloomberg columnist Matt Levine proposed that "it could be in Hunterbrook’s long-term interest to invest in some investigations that are not actionable" if "those investigations build up audience and credibility for the news outlet," based on a Newsweek report on a Hunterbrook scoop about the Drake-Kendrick Lamar feud.

The House Committee on Energy and Commerce urged Cabinet members to investigate BrainCo citing Hunterbrook's reporting with Pablo Torre Finds Out and New York Times' The Athletic alleging the company's brain-computer interface technology was secretly funded by entities linked to the Chinese government for potential military use. The reporting claimed data included brainwaves from tennis star Jannik Sinner and racing driver Charles Leclerc.

Axios reported "there's certainly no guarantee of success, but the idea is intriguing," and "whether or not Hunterbrook's output is journalism is a mostly theological question."
