= The Lucky Ones (film) =

2008 film by Neil Burger

- Theatrical release poster
- Directed by: Neil Burger
- Written by: Neil Burger; Dirk Wittenborn
- Produced by: Neil Burger; Brian Koppelman; David Levien; Rick Schwartz
- Starring: Tim Robbins; Rachel McAdams; Michael Peña
- Cinematography: Declan Quinn
- Edited by: Naomi Geraghty
- Music by: Rolfe Kent
- Production companies: Koppelman & Levien Productions; Overnight Productions
- Distributed by: Lionsgate; Roadside Attractions (United States); QED International (Overseas)
- Release dates: November 21, 2007 (Austin Fantastic Film Fest); September 26, 2008 (United States)
- Running time: 113 minutes
- Country: United States
- Language: English
- Budget: $14 million
- Box office: $266,967

The Lucky Ones is a 2007 American comedy-drama directed by Neil Burger and stars Tim Robbins, Rachel McAdams and Michael Peña.

The screenplay by Burger and Dirk Wittenborn focuses on three United States Army soldiers who find themselves drawn together by unforeseen circumstances.

The film was released in the US on September 26, 2008, and was a box office bomb.

== Plot ==
Having completed his latest tour of duty, middle-aged SSG Fred Cheaver has retired from military service and is returning home to his wife and son in suburban St. Louis. PFC Colee Dunn and SSG T.K. Poole each have a thirty-day leave, and both are headed to Las Vegas. Colee plans to visit the family of her boyfriend, a soldier who was killed in action after saving her life, and T.K. wants to engage the services of a sex surrogate he hopes will cure the impotence he is experiencing as a result of a shrapnel injury before he reunites with his girlfriend.

Upon arrival at JFK, the three strangers discover all outbound flights have been canceled due to a lengthy blackout that ended just before their arrival. Rather than face a potentially long wait before normal flight schedules resume, they rent a minivan and drive westward.

Arriving home in St. Louis, Cheaver learns his wife Pat wants a divorce, and his son Scott has been accepted at Stanford University. Scott's scholarship will only cover part of his tuition and he needs to pay the $20,000 balance immediately to secure his place at the university.

Cheaver decides to visit his brother in Salt Lake City, but first drives Colee and T.K. to the airport so they can fly to Las Vegas. When they see how devastated he is, and fearing his state of mind will put him at risk on the open road, they decide to continue with him. As their journey progresses and they open themselves up to each other, the three gradually become closer and share unexpected adventures.

At a revival meeting conducted by Pastor Jerry Nolan, a member of the congregation invites them to a birthday party in his palatial home. They conflict with the man's adult children over the latter's anti-war sentiments and Cheaver is seduced by a guest who wants him to participate in a threesome with her and her husband Bob, but he abstains.

Later, Colee and T.K. leave Cheaver at a campsite while they go look for provisions. While driving, they are forced to flee an approaching tornado and take shelter in a culvert. As they cling closely to each other, T.K. discovers he might not need the sex surrogate after all.

Cheaver decides to bypass Salt Lake City and try his luck in the Las Vegas casinos. When Colee discovers that a guitar similar to the one she is returning to her boyfriend's parents recently sold at an online auction for $22,000, she is tempted to give it to Cheaver, but he encourages her to complete her mission.

Colee is welcomed warmly by her boyfriend's parents, Tom and Jeanie Klinger. However, she quickly discovers that not only nothing he had told her about himself and his past was true, but he has omitted some important details as well. Neither of the Klingers recognizes the guitar, supposedly a family heirloom, and living with them are Shannon and the baby she had after a one-night stand with their son.

His mother senses that Colee and her son must have been involved, but he had not been truthful about his life stateside. The Klingers invite her to spend the remainder of her leave with them. Disillusioned, Colee declines, but she asks to keep the guitar, and they readily agree.

Colee, Cheaver, and T.K. are reunited at the local police station. T.K. had confessed to a casino robbery Colee's boyfriend had claimed he committed before enlisting, to avoid returning to the Middle East by being sentenced to a prison term. His plan backfires when he learns the crime is yet another fabrication.

Colee insists Cheaver take the guitar but he tells her he already has the $20,000 he needs. His friends are stunned he won the money so quickly, but he confesses he received it as a bonus for re-enlisting. They go their separate ways, but weeks later meet again at the airport as they prepare to return to Iraq, each deployed to a different place.

== Cast ==
- Rachel McAdams as Private First Class Colee Dunn, USA
- Tim Robbins as Staff Sergeant Fred Cheaver, USA
- Michael Peña as Staff Sergeant T.K. Poole, USA
- Molly Hagan as Pat Cheaver
- Mark L. Young as Scott Cheaver
- Spencer Garrett as Pastor Jerry Nolan
- Howard Platt as Stan Tilson
- Arden Myrin as Barbara Tilson
- John Heard as Bob
- Jennifer Joan Taylor as Bob's Wife
- Katherine LaNasa as Janet
- Scott Jaeck as Guitar Store Owner
- John Diehl as Tom Klinger
- Annie Corley as Jeanie Klinger

== Production ==
Screenwriter/director Neil Burger said he decided to write his script after filming The Illusionist in Prague, where the Iraq War frequently was debated. He also drew inspiration from The Last Detail and its seriocomic mood, episodic structure, and such plot details as an odd religious detour and a meeting with prostitutes. In A Look Inside The Lucky Ones, a bonus feature included in the film's DVD release, he explained he intentionally avoided mentioning Iraq because he wanted the audience to concentrate on the heart of the characters rather than focus on the specific war they were fighting. The film, which takes no position on the war, is the first Iraq War-related Hollywood project the Army has supported by providing personnel and technical help.

Much of the film was shot on location in Illinois at sites including Alsip, Arlington Heights, Barrington, Bolingbrook, Chicago, Edwardsville, Naperville, Niles, O' Fallon and Park Ridge and Skokie. Other locations included Chesterfield and St. Louis in Missouri, Denver and Grand Junction in Colorado, and Las Vegas.

After seeing a rough cut of the film in September 2007, Lions Gate Entertainment executives considered rushing it into theaters to qualify for Academy Award consideration. But when the similarly war-themed films In the Valley of Elah, Rendition, and Lions for Lambs opened and failed to generate much box office revenue, the studio and Neil Burger decided to schedule it for Spring 2008.

When the film's future remained in limbo, producer Rick Schwartz acknowledged the difficulty in marketing a war-related film to an audience that recently had rejected three, although The Lucky Ones primarily is a road movie, and its sole combat scene lasts only forty seconds. "What should we do with this one?," Schwartz wondered. "Do you do a trailer that’s more light and comedic that hides the fact that it’s really about three soldiers, or do you try to stay as true to the spirit of the film as possible?" Burger considered either trimming the already short combat scene or removing it completely "to somehow mitigate or minimize the problem, or the perceived problem," but ultimately decided, "To not have the more serious scenes to balance out the humor feels somehow disrespectful to these characters."

The film premiered at ShoWest on March 10, 2008, and was shown at the Toronto International Film Festival and was the opening night film at the San Diego Film Festival before opening on 425 screens in the United States and Canada on September 26. It earned $183,088 on its opening weekend, ranking #33 at the box office.

== Critical reception ==
The Lucky Ones received negative reviews from critics. Review aggregation website Rotten Tomatoes gives the film a score of 37% based on reviews from 75 critics, with an average score of 5.03/10. The site's consensus states, "The Lucky Ones features heartfelt performances, but is undone by the plot's overwrought parade of coincidence and contrivance." On Metacritic, the film has a weighted average score of 53 out of 100, based on 25 critics, indicating "mixed or average reviews".

Laura Kern of The New York Times noted the film "has little interest in making bold pro- or antiwar proclamations. With a smooth, light touch (though not without bumps and awkward moments) it focuses instead on the idea that the present and the people who factor into it are all we really have. Aside from the opening, the only combat scenes to be found here are strictly domestic, and, in terms of its lead characters, internal . . . Their journey is jampacked with misadventures and personal epiphanies, some touching, others laughably contrived . . . But because the lead actors work so well together, adding depth and levels of vulnerability to fairly underwritten roles, the emotional consequences of the sense of displacement these 'lucky' characters — lucky to be alive, lucky to have met one another — must deal with always ring true."

Roger Ebert of the Chicago Sun-Times observed, "What makes "The Lucky Ones" so gratifying to me is anything but gravitas; these three characters are simply likable, warm, sincere, and often funny. The performances are so good, they carry the film right along . . . I believe audiences will be moved by the characters. I was."

Owen Gleiberman of Entertainment Weekly graded the film B− and noted, "It's all very facile — war's domestic fallout made into feel-good fodder — but The Lucky Ones isn't dull, and the actors do quite nicely, especially McAdams, who's feisty, gorgeous, and as mercurial as a mood ring."

Todd McCarthy of Variety thought, "It's hard to find the genuine heartfelt moments . . . under the clutter of narrative contrivances and coincidences . . . The daily life-and-death crises these characters faced in Iraq are replaced on their trip by the less dire but still pressing matters facing them at home, the subtext being that Iraq represents a distraction from domestic matters, which consequently suffer from neglect. There are moments when the sought-after poignancy born of this dilemma is felt, but they are all too fleeting and dominated by exaggerated dramatics and broad comedy, especially as they relate to intimate matters. The tone overall is ill-managed."

Ann Hornaday of The Washington Post said the film "is drenched not just in contrivance but condescension, for its protagonists and the clueless civilians they encounter. Surely all those constituencies deserve better."

Peter Hartlaub of the San Francisco Chronicle called it a "thoughtful portrait" but added, "As the film meanders, the powerful moments barely outnumber the ridiculous . . . When the movie works, it's a nice snapshot of space and time, which is aided by Burger's decision to film on location (with at least 30 percent of the film taking place inside the minivan). But he makes several wrong turns, starting with the sound. The musical score features jaunty, lighthearted piano tinkling and strings that should have been destined for a Grey's Anatomy spin-off, not material this serious. And the road noise coming from outside the minivan is a constant distraction. Although many of the developments feel novel and spontaneous [...] others challenge the audience to accept behavior and coincidences that often seem outlandish. Some of the scenes adopt the forced wackiness of an Arrested Development episode, and the final 15 minutes are particularly frustrating [...] All of the actors make the best of well-intentioned plot turns that often don't feel true. The Lucky Ones has plenty of heart and courage. If it only had a brain ..."

Marjorie Baumgarten of the Austin Chronicle rated the film 2½ out of four stars and commented, "So far, the box office has not been terribly kind to movies about the Iraq war or the soldiers who wage it. The Lucky Ones is not likely to alter that situation, although the solid threesome of actors at the film's core and the storyline set entirely on American soil may earn the film greater props from moviegoers than some of the previous films. In many ways, The Lucky Ones is a universal story about rudderless Americans, not just this particular pack of Army veterans. Yet, the story [...] contains too many coincidences and convergences to wholly ring true [...] Robbins is quietly effective as the elder of the bunch, while Peña shows us something of the growth of a cocky kid into sobering adulthood."

== Home media ==
The film was released on Region 1 DVD on January 27, 2009. It is in anamorphic widescreen format with an English audio track and English and Spanish subtitles. The sole bonus feature is A Look Inside The Lucky Ones, which includes interviews with cast and crew members.
