= Interview with the Assassin =

Interview With the Assassin
- DVD cover
- Directed by: Neil Burger
- Written by: Neil Burger
- Produced by: Brian Koppelman; David Levien
- Starring: Raymond J. Barry; Dylan Haggerty
- Cinematography: Richard Rutkowski
- Edited by: Brad Fuller
- Distributed by: Magnolia Pictures
- Release date: November 15, 2002
- Running time: 85 minutes
- Language: English
- Budget: $1 million
- Box office: $48,058

Interview with the Assassin is a 2002 American pseudo-documentary drama film directed by Neil Burger and starring Raymond J. Barry and Dylan Haggerty.

== Plot ==
An unemployed cameraman, Ron Kobeleski (Haggerty), is asked by his reclusive neighbor, a retired Marine named Walter Ohlinger (Barry) who has been diagnosed with terminal cancer, to document a startling confession: that he, not Lee Harvey Oswald, killed President John F. Kennedy in Dallas, Texas on November 22, 1963. A stunned Kobeleski learns that the conspiracy theory that says there was a second gunman on the grassy knoll is true — because he was that second gunman. To prove it, he shows Kobeleski a spent casing from the rifle he used.

A skeptical Kobeleski demands proof and follows Ohlinger as he attempts to prove his claims. He speaks to people who support Ohlinger's claims, but others, most notably his ex-wife, point to Ohlinger as a fraud and a lunatic.

The film ends with Walter Ohlinger's failed attempt to assassinate the present-day president. Kobeleski later shoots Ohlinger in self-defense at his own home. Ron Kobeleski is arrested and charged as an accomplice in the assassination attempt and sent to prison for 3 years. In a short interview with a reporter, he states, "telling his side of the story won't help him at all." The closing credits state that Kobeleski was killed in prison.

For the most part, "Interview with the Assassin" is filmed from Ron Kobeleski's perspective, as if he had shot it with his own camera. On a few occasions, the viewer sees Dylan Haggerty, the actor portraying him.

== Awards ==
Interview with the Assassin won three awards at The New York International Independent Film and Video Festival: Best Experimental Film, Best Director (Burger), and Best Actor (Barry).

== Reviews and commentary ==
Reviewing the film for NYT, Dave Kehr wrote that Interview with the Assassin "is a concise summary of every who-killed-Kennedy paranoid thriller ever made, reduced to two principal characters, a single camera and a running time of 88 minutes." Kehr praised Barry's portrayal of Ohlinger, describing him as "a performer who can dart between stentorian self-assurance and cringing pathos, maintaining his character's ambiguity until the final sequence of this resourceful and ingenious entertainment." According to The Inquirer's Steven Rea, the film "is a compelling, unsettling meditation on the nature of history, identity and truth"; he favorably reviewed Barry's performance as "chillingly good".

Patrick Z. McGavin for the Chicago Tribune stated "Interview With the Assassin is imbued with a sinister air of danger that unfortunately dissipates in the final moments." Calling Barry's performance "excellent", McGavin wrote: "He has an authoritative presence and a sense of mystery and danger, that like this movie, demands to be taken seriously." Owen Gleiberman of EW compared its cinematography to The Blair Witch Project and described it as "a verite enigma-thriller, the pieces of which are more gripping than the finished puzzle." Manohla Dargis in the LA Times complimented Burger's cinematography and his choice of Barry as Ohlinger, but said "it's too bad [Burger] didn't work harder at finding something more original with which to test his talent than the JFK assassination and the gimmick of the phony nonfiction film."

WaPo's Ann Hornaday wrote that the movie was filmed in "the deadpan mockumentary style familiar to fans of This Is Spinal Tap and The Blair Witch Project. The stylistic conceit is so hackneyed that even the most impeccable execution isn't enough to make it compelling." David Wrone, author of The Zapruder Film: Reframing JFK's Assassination, stated: "The facts in Interview with the Assassin were so egregiously in error, I had to stop watching it."

== See also ==
- Assassinations in fiction
- Assassination of John F. Kennedy in popular culture
