= Grosso v. Miramax Film Corp. =

- Court: United States Court of Appeals for the Ninth Circuit
- Full case name: Jeff Grosso v. Miramax Film Corp.
- Argued: April 7, 2003
- Decided: September 8, 2004
- Citation: 383 F.3d 965

Holding
- A screenwriter's claim for breach of implied contract is not preempted by Federal Copyright Law.

Court membership
- Judges sitting: Mary M. Schroeder, David R. Thompson, Susan P. Graber

Case opinions
- Majority: Schroeder, joined by a unanimous court

Laws applied
- Desney v. Wilder, 46 Cal.2d 715 (1956).

Grosso v. Miramax Film Corp., 383 F.3d 965 (9th Cir. 2004), was an entertainment law case in which the United States Court of Appeals for the Ninth Circuit held that a screenwriter's claim for breach of implied contract was not preempted by United States federal copyright law, because the screenwriter's claim alleged an extra element that transformed the action from one arising under the ambit of the federal copyright statute to one sounding in contract.

== Facts ==
Jeff Grosso, the author of a screenplay entitled "The Shell Game," claimed that Miramax stole the ideas and themes of his work when it made the movie "Rounders."

== Issue ==
Did the District Court properly dismiss Grosso's state law causes of action for breach of contract as preempted by the federal Copyright Act?

== Result ==
The Ninth Circuit found that the District Court erred in concluding that a screenwriter's claim for breach of implied contract was preempted by Federal Copyright Law. In so holding, the Court reasoned that Grosso's claim alleged an extra element that transformed the action from one arising under the ambit of the federal copyright statute to one sounding in contract. After remand to the California state courts, Grosso's implied contract claim was found to be without merit. Summary judgment was entered against Grosso. On appeal, the California Court of Appeal, Second Appellate District, affirmed the summary judgment, and awarded the defendants their costs of suit.
