= Jennifer Joan Taylor =

French-American actress

- Born: Paris, France
- Occupation: Actress
- Years active: 1979–present
- Spouse: Garry Henderson (m. 1979)
- Children: 2

Jennifer Joan Taylor is a French-American actress in film and television. She is best known for playing Police Detective Chris Egan in the American daytime television soap opera, The Edge of Night. She is sometimes credited as Jennifer Taylor.

== Early life ==
Taylor was born in Paris, France, but was raised in Rice Lake, Wisconsin. She graduated from Viterbo University in 1978 with a theater arts degree.

== Acting career ==
In 1979, Taylor began acting at the Guthrie Theatre in Minneapolis, MN. In 1983, Taylor began her television career by appearing in a Hellman's mayonnaise television commercial. In the spring of that year, she was cast as Police Detective Chris Egan in the American daytime television soap opera, The Edge of Night. Her first appearance on the soap was on May 25, 1983, and she played that role until the soap's final episode on December 28, 1984. In the fall of 1983, she played the part of a soap opera actress in an ABC Afterschool Special episode.

Taylor's first film role was in Fright Night Part 2 (1988), and she starred as Karen Webb in the American thriller film, The Crude Oasis (1995). She has had parts in a number of other films, including Casualties (1997), White Chicks, Incorporated (1998), The Weather Man (2005) and Derailed (2005).

From 2005 to 2006, Taylor played Becky in Prison Break, and in 2008 she appeared in the film, The Lucky Ones. More recently, she has been seen in numerous episodes of Empire (2015–17) and Chicago Fire (2014–2020).

== Personal life ==
Taylor has been married to Garry Henderson since 1979 and they have two children

== Partial filmography ==
Year	Title	Role	Notes
1983	ABC Afterschool Special	Soap Opera Actress	TV series (1 episode)
1983–84	The Edge of Night	Police Det. Chris Egan	TV series (55 episodes)
1986	Highway to Heaven	Secretary	TV series (1 episode)
1986	Tall Tales & Legends	Polly	TV series (1 episode)
1988	The Days and Nights of Molly Dodd	Customer	TV series (1 episode)
1988	Fright Night Part 2	Secretary/Receptionist	Film
1989	Newhart	Ellie	TV series (1 episode)
1990	The New Adam-12	Mrs Collins	TV series (1 episode)
1993	In the Company of Darkness	Mother	TV movie
1993	Missing Persons	Ilyse Atema	TV series (1 episode)
1995	The Crude Oasis	Karen Webb	Film
1997	Casualties	Teacher	Film
1997	Early Edition	Vivian Dankowski	TV series (1 episode)
1998	White Chicks, Incorporated	Spoogle Girl #9	Film
2001	The Misanthrope	School Teacher	Film
2005	The Weather Man	Register Worker	Film
2005	Derailed	Real Estate Agent	Film
2005–06	Prison Break	Becky	TV series (7 episodes)
2008	The Lucky Ones	Bob's Wife	Film
2015–17	Empire	Various	TV series (5 episodes)
2017	Chicago Justice	DeeDee Carter	TV series (1 episode)
2014–20	Chicago Fire	Various	TV series (2 episodes)
2020	I Used to Go Here	Hugo's mom	Film
