= Steven Bramson =

American composer

Steven "Steve" Bramson is an American composer who has been nominated for two Primetime Emmy Awards, and has won one Daytime Emmy Award and three ASCAP Awards. He has written music to George Lucas' Young Indiana Jones and the CBS series JAG. Bramson's music has been played in New York City, London and Vienna. He is currently writing a musical titled Shimmy. The lyrics are being credited to Pamela Phillips Oland. Although he once considered being an economist, Steve is also an excellent jazz pianist, who has backed up major jazz stars and once played in the Montreux Jazz Festival.

== Filmography ==
- In Enemy Hands
- Yogi the Easter Bear
- Adventures in Animation 3D
- Scooby-Doo on Zombie Island
- Casualties
- The Crude Oasis
- Don McKay
- Decoding Annie Parker
- Dominion

== Television credits ==
- Tiger Cruise
- Navy NCIS
- JAG
- The Young Indiana Jones Chronicles
- Love Can Be Murder
- Tiny Toon Adventures ("Psychic Fun-omenon Day", "Hero Hamton", "How Sweetie It Is", "Henny Youngman Day" and "The Horror of Slumber Party Mountain")
- Jake and the Fatman
- Journeyman
- The Nine

== Musicals ==
- Shimmy

== Theme park attractions ==
De la Terre à la Lune - the synchronized on-board audio theme used for the original version of Space Mountain in Disneyland Paris, named Space Mountain: De la Terre à la Lune from 1995 - 2005.
