= The Crude Oasis =

- Theatrical release poster
- Directed by: Alex Graves
- Written by: Alex Graves
- Produced by: Alex Graves
- Starring: Jennifer Taylor; Aaron Shields; Robert Peterson; Michael Sibay; Lynn Bieler; Roberta Eaton
- Cinematography: Steven Quale
- Edited by: Alex Graves
- Music by: Steven Bramson
- Production company: Bluestem Films
- Distributed by: Miramax Films
- Release date: July 7, 1995
- Running time: 81 minutes
- Country: United States
- Language: English

The Crude Oasis is a 1995 American drama film written and directed by Alex Graves. The film stars Jennifer Taylor, Aaron Shields, Robert Peterson, Michael Sibay, Lynn Bieler and Roberta Eaton. The film was released on July 7, 1995, by Miramax Films.

== Cast ==
- Jennifer Taylor as Karen Webb
- Aaron Shields as Harley Underwood
- Robert Peterson as Jim Webb
- Michael Sibay as The Lover
- Lynn Bieler as Stone
- Roberta Eaton as Cheri
