= Alexis Stewart =

American talk radio host (born 1965)

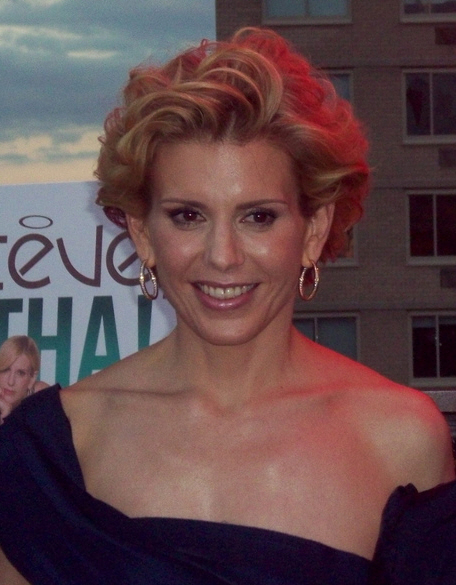
- Stewart at the Whatever, Martha premiere (2008)
- Born: Alexis Gilbert Stewart; September 27, 1965 (age 61); New York City, U.S.
- Education: Barnard College
- Occupations: Radio personality, television host
- Spouse: John Robert Cuti (m. 1997; div. 2004)
- Children: 2
- Mother: Martha Stewart

Alexis Gilbert Stewart (born September 27, 1965) is an American television and radio host presenter. She is the only child of Martha Stewart and her ex-husband Andrew Stewart. She was the co-host of Whatever with Alexis and Jennifer on Sirius Satellite Radio, and Whatever with Alexis and Jennifer on the Hallmark Channel alongside co-host Jennifer Hutt.

== Personal life ==
Stewart was born in Manhattan. She graduated from Putney School in Putney, Vermont, in 1983. She earned a bachelor's degree in English at Barnard College at Columbia University in 1987. Her mother, Martha Stewart, had also attended Barnard.

In 1997, Stewart married John Robert Cuti, a lawyer and former lead guitarist for The Inflatables. Cuti served as a trial lawyer during Martha Stewart's ImClone stock trading case, alongside her lead attorney Robert Morvillo. Stewart and Cuti separated before Martha Stewart was indicted in June 2003 but were not divorced until mid-2004, after the trial was over.

Stewart has a daughter Jude (b. 2011) and son Truman (b. 2012), both through gestational surrogacy. As of 2024, she lives in New York.

== Career ==
Stewart previously co-hosted Whatever with Alexis and Jennifer on Sirius Satellite Radio and as of September 13, 2010, also on television on the Hallmark Channel. Stewart and former radio partner Jennifer Hutt talked about topics ranging from pop culture to personal relationships. The show was billed as being about "whatever" the two women are thinking, reading, or hearing.

Stewart and Hutt's TV show, Whatever, Martha, premiered on the Fine Living Network on September 16, 2008. The second season premiered on September 23, 2009. On Whatever, Martha, Stewart and Hutt made fun of old Martha Stewart Living episodes and attempt to cook or create one of Martha Stewart's projects to see how difficult the projects are to complete. In one episode, Martha appears on the show and makes fun of herself and her guests.

The third season of Whatever with Alexis and Jennifer, which ran as Whatever, You're Wrong!, premiered on the Hallmark Channel on April 8, 2011. Whatever, Martha also premiered on the Hallmark Channel on April 8, 2011. On June 7, 2011, Stewart posted on her Whatever blog that her last day on Whatever would be that Friday, June 10.
