= Michael C. Fina =

Defunct American retailer

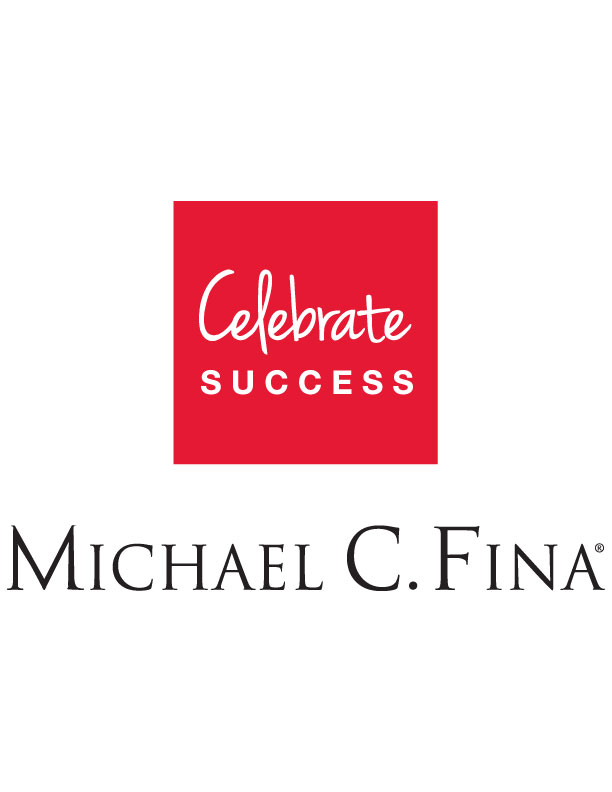
Michael C. Fina Recognition

Michael C. Fina was a family-owned fine goods retailer and worldwide employee recognition company, based and operated in New York City and known for its online store for bridal registries and home goods.

The company was last run by the third generation of the Fina family. Steven Fina was President and Chief Merchant of the retail division. Ashley Fina, was Owner and President, she also led Michael C. Fina Recognition, a separate business that existed under the Michael C. Fina brand.

== History ==
Michael C. Fina was founded by Michael Charles Fina and Rose Rosenblatt in 1935, Michael C. Fina opened on the fourth floor of 580 Fifth Avenue at 47th Street in Manhattan when Rosenblatt negotiated a partnership in exchange for investing in the company. The two later married and had two sons, George and Charles.

During the 1950s the company expanded into the retail market. Outgrowing the original fourth floor location at 580 Fifth Avenue, the company moved down two floors in the same building to the second floor location that would become the company's home for the next several decades. The second floor housed a larger showroom, a jewelry department, and a shipping department. During their years in this store, the phrase "Upstairs at Michael C. Fina" was coined.

They remained at 580 Fifth Ave. until 1998 before moving to 545 Fifth Avenue and ultimately 500 Park Avenue and their target market shifted from discounter to luxury as they changed locations.

Michael C. Fina was one of the first companies in New York City to enter the bridal registry business. At its peak the company registered over 10,000 brides per year.

=== Closure ===
In 2016, the company closed its physical store due to a drop in foot traffic and transformed into an online-only retailer partnering with Amazon and Zola. The company ceased operations in April 2019.

== Employee Recognition ==
Entering the recognition business in the 1960s, the Finas incorporated lifestyle gifts alongside more traditional recognition items such as tie tacks and desk clocks and by 2015 provided rewards to Fortune 1000 companies. In 2017, it was acquired by HALO Branded Solutions and became known as Michael C. Fina Recognition - A HALO Company.
