= Rounders (film) =

1998 American drama film by John Dahl

- Theatrical release poster
- Directed by: John Dahl
- Written by: David Levien; Brian Koppelman
- Produced by: Joel Stillerman; Ted Demme
- Starring: Matt Damon; Edward Norton; John Turturro; Famke Janssen; Gretchen Mol; John Malkovich; Martin Landau
- Cinematography: Jean-Yves Escoffier
- Edited by: Scott Chestnut
- Music by: Christopher Young
- Production company: Spanky Pictures
- Distributed by: Miramax Films
- Release dates: September 4, 1998 (Venice Film Festival); September 8, 1998 (Deauville Film Festival); September 11, 1998 (United States)
- Running time: 121 minutes
- Country: United States
- Language: English
- Budget: $12 million
- Box office: $22.9 million (United States)

Rounders is a 1998 American crime drama film about the underground world of high-stakes poker, directed by John Dahl and starring Matt Damon and Edward Norton. The story follows two friends who need to win at high-stakes poker to quickly pay off a large debt. The term "rounder" refers to a person traveling around from city to city seeking high-stakes card games.

Rounders premiered at the Venice Film Festival on September 4, 1998, and was theatrically released in the United States on September 11. It received mixed reviews from critics and was moderately successful at the box office, grossing $22.9 million against a $12 million budget. As a result of the poker boom in the early 2000s, the film gained a cult following. A novelization of the film was written by Kevin Canty and released by Hyperion Books.

== Plot ==
New York City law student and gifted poker player Mike McDermott dreams of winning the World Series of Poker. At an underground Texas hold 'em game run by Russian mobster Teddy "KGB", an overconfident Mike loses his entire $30,000 bankroll in a single hand. Shaken, he promises his girlfriend and fellow student Jo he has quit poker, and concentrates on law school. His mentor Joey Knish offers to stake him to rebuild his bankroll, but Mike declines and accepts a part-time job to make money.

Months pass and Mike stays true to his promise until his childhood friend, Lester "Worm" Murphy, is released from prison. While Mike is an honest player, Worm is a hustler and unapologetic cheat. To help Worm pay off a debt, Mike sets him up with games across town and reluctantly sits in on one, interfering with his studies and his relationship with Jo. Mike allows Worm to play on his credit at the Chesterfield Club. After being lent $2,000, Worm gets up to $10,000 and cashes out for the full amount, which starts a tab in Mike's name. Worm runs into Grama, a dangerous pimp, who reveals he is working for KGB and has bought Worm's debt, now totaling $25,000 with interest. Grama takes Worm's $10,000, threatening him to pay the rest. As Mike returns to his poker lifestyle and friends, Jo ends their relationship.

Mike learns from Petra at the Chesterfield that Worm has racked up a $7,000 debt in Mike's name. Worm tells Mike about Grama, but withholds the KGB connection. Mike vouches for Worm to Grama, but Worm and Grama insult each other and nearly come to blows. Grama gives them five days to pay the remaining $15,000. Mike decides to help Worm win the money by playing in several games in and around the city.

Mike wins $7,200 in three days, but still needs to more than double it in 48 hours. Worm drives Mike to Binghamton for a game hosted by New York state troopers, where he comes close to winning the $7,800 needed before Worm unexpectedly joins the game. Soon after, a trooper catches Worm base-dealing to help Mike; they are beaten up and relieved of their entire bankroll. Worm confesses that Grama is working for KGB and decides to flee; Mike returns to the city alone.

Mike asks Grama for more time, to no avail. He asks Knish for the money, but is refused out of principle. Knish chastises him for poor decisions, and Mike finally reveals why he took the ill-fated risk at KGB's club; he once beat poker legend Johnny Chan at a single hand in Atlantic City and thinks he can compete and possibly win the World Series of Poker. Desperate, Mike goes to his law professor, Petrovsky, who lends him $10,000. Mike challenges KGB to a second heads-up no-limit Texas hold 'em game for the remaining debt, with winner-take-all stakes, which KGB accepts. Mike beats KGB in the first session, winning $20,000. KGB offers to let Mike's winnings "ride" and continue the game, but Mike – with enough to pay off most of his debts – declines. As he is about to leave, KGB taunts that he is paying Mike with the money that he won from their previous game. Mike changes his mind and decides to continue playing.

Mike doubles the blinds at the risk of losing everything, and possibly his life, to KGB. As the night wears on, he spots KGB's tell and folds a crucial hand. Irate at missing a chance to bust Mike, KGB begins to play on "tilt". In the final hand, Mike baits a boastful KGB into going all-in and defeats him with a nut straight. KGB throws a tantrum at having been lured into a mistake. The rattled KGB calls off his goons and admits that Mike won fairly, allowing him to leave with his winnings.

With over $60,000, Mike settles Worm's $15,000 debt to Grama, the Chesterfield's $6,000 credit, and his professor's $10,000 loan, and restores his original bankroll of "three stacks of high society". He drops out of law school, bids Jo goodbye, and leaves for Las Vegas to play in the World Series of Poker.

== Cast ==
- Matt Damon as Mike McDermott
- Edward Norton as Lester "Worm" Murphy
- John Malkovich as Teddy "KGB"
- John Turturro as Joey Knish (Note: Turturro's character was based on underground poker player Joel "Bagels" Rosenberg)
- Famke Janssen as Petra
- Murphy Guyer as Sergeant Detweiler
- Michael Rispoli as Grama
- Martin Landau as Judge Abe Petrovsky
- Gretchen Mol as Jo
- Bill Yeagle as Russian Thug
- Melina Kanakaredes as Barbara
- Josh Mostel as Zagosh
- Tom Aldredge as Judge Marinacci
- Michael Lombard as District Attorney Shields
- Lenny Clarke as Savino
- Chris Messina as Higgins
- Goran Višnjić as Maurice
- David Zayas as Trooper Osborne
- Johnny Chan as himself
- Bill Camp as Eisenberg
- Josh Pais as Weitz
- Adam LeFevre as Sean Frye

== Production ==
Principal photography for Rounders began in December 1997. The start of the film's shooting coincided with the release of Damon's critically acclaimed film Good Will Hunting, which was released in December 1997 by Miramax, the same studio which would distribute Rounders. Shooting took place mostly in New York City. Exceptions include the law school scenes (filmed at Rutgers School of Law-Newark), East Jersey State Prison, seen from the outside at the beginning of the film, and the state trooper poker game and parking lot scenes (filmed at the B.P.O Elks Lodge in Ridgefield Park, New Jersey).

== Soundtrack ==
The soundtrack features the song "Baby, I'm a Big Star Now" by Counting Crows. The song plays during the end credits, and appeared as a bonus track in the UK version of the album Saturday Nights & Sunday Mornings.

== Reception ==
=== Box office ===
Rounders was released on September 11, 1998, in 2,176 theaters and grossed $8.5 million during its opening weekend. It went on to make $22.9 million domestically.

=== Critical response ===
On Rotten Tomatoes, the film has an approval rating of 64% based on 80 reviews, with an average score of 6.2/10. The site's critical consensus reads: "Richly atmospheric and colorful performances contributed to the movie's entertainment value." Metacritic gives the film a weighted average score of 53 out of 100 based on 32 reviews, indicating "mixed or average reviews". Audiences polled by CinemaScore gave the film an average grade of "B−" on an A+ to F scale.

Roger Ebert of the Chicago Sun-Times gave the film three stars out of four and wrote: "Rounders sometimes has a noir look but it never has a noir feel, because it's not about losers (or at least it doesn't admit it is). It's essentially a sports picture, in which the talented hero wins, loses, faces disaster, and then is paired off one last time against the champ." In her review for The New York Times, Janet Maslin wrote: "Though John Dahl's Rounders finally adds up to less than meets the eye, what does meet the eye (and ear) is mischievously entertaining." USA Today gave the film three out of four stars and wrote: "The card playing is well-staged, and even those who don't know a Texas hold-'em ('the Cadillac of poker') from a Texas hoedown will get a vicarious charge out of the action." Entertainment Weekly gave the film a "B" rating and Owen Gleiberman wrote, "Norton, cast in what might have once been the Sean Penn role (hideous shirts, screw-you attitude), gives Worm a shifty, amphetamine soul and a pleasing alacrity ... Norton's performance never really goes anywhere, but that's okay, since the story is just an excuse to lead the characters from one poker table to the next."

Peter Travers, in his review for Rolling Stone said of John Malkovich's performance: "Of course, no one could guess the extent to which Malkovich is now capable of chewing scenery. He surpasses even his eyeballrolling as Cyrus the Virus in Con Air. Munching Oreo cookies, splashing the pot with chips (a poker no-no) and speaking with a Russian accent that defies deciphering ("Ho-kay, Meester sum of a beech"), Malkovich soars so far over the top, he's passing Pluto." In his review for the San Francisco Chronicle, Mick LaSalle said of Damon's performance: "Mike should supply the drive the film otherwise lacks, and Damon doesn't. We might believe he can play cards, but we don't believe he needs to do it, in the way, say, that the 12-year-old Mozart needed to write symphonies. He's not consumed with genius. He's a nice guy with a skill." In his review for The Globe and Mail, Liam Lacey wrote: "The main problem with Rounders is that the movie never quite knows what it is about: What is the moral ante?"

Despite an unremarkable theatrical release, Rounders has a following, particularly among poker enthusiasts.

Some pro poker players credit the film for getting them into the game. The film drew in successful players such as Brian Rast, Hevad Khan, Gavin Griffin, and Dutch Boyd. Vanessa Rousso has said of the film's influence: "There have been lots of movies that have included poker, but only Rounders really captures the energy and tension in the game. And that's why it stands as the best poker movie ever made."

== Home media ==
In the United States, The film was released on VHS and DVD on February 9, 1999, by Buena Vista Home Entertainment (under the Miramax Home Entertainment banner). A U.S. LaserDisc release followed on February 23, 1999, with the film also being released on LaserDisc in Japan on November 26, 1999. Buena Vista Home Entertainment/Miramax Home Entertainment later released a collector's edition DVD on September 7, 2004.

In 2010, Miramax was sold by The Walt Disney Company, their owners since 1993. That same year, the studio was taken over by private equity firm Filmyard Holdings. Filmyard licensed the home media rights for several Miramax titles to Lionsgate, and on August 23, 2011, Lionsgate Home Entertainment released Rounders on Blu-ray, in addition to reissuing it on DVD on that date. Lionsgate released another Blu-ray of the film on October 1, 2013, with new artwork. In 2011, Filmyard Holdings licensed the Miramax library to streamer Netflix. This deal included Rounders, and ran for five years, eventually ending on June 1, 2016.

Filmyard Holdings sold Miramax to Qatari company beIN Media Group during March 2016. In April 2020, ViacomCBS (now known as Paramount Skydance) acquired the rights to Miramax's library, after buying a 49% stake in the studio from beIN. Rounders was one of the 700 titles they acquired in the deal, and since April 2020, the film has been distributed by Paramount Pictures. Paramount Home Entertainment reissued the film on Blu-ray on February 23, 2021, with this being one of many Miramax titles that they reissued around this time. The 2021 Blu-ray uses the same artwork as the 2013 Lionsgate Blu-ray, but adds Paramount's mountain logo to the packaging like with all of their other Miramax reissues. Rounders was later made available on Paramount's subscription streaming service Paramount+, in addition to being made available on their free streaming service Pluto TV.
