= Yellowstone (franchise) =

American media franchise

- The logo of Yellowstone (2018).
- Created by: Taylor Sheridan; John Linson
- Original work: Yellowstone (2018)
- Owners: MTV Entertainment Group (Skydance)

Films and television
- Television series: Yellowstone; 1883; 1923; Marshals; Dutton Ranch

Yellowstone, sometimes called the Duttonverse or spelled alternatively as the Dutton-verse, is an American media franchise created by Taylor Sheridan and John Linson, and owned by Skydance. It follows the Dutton family over the years, owners of the largest cattle ranch in Montana, the Yellowstone Dutton Ranch, and centers around the family drama at the ranch and the bordering Broken Rock Indian Reservation, Yellowstone National Park, and land developers.

The franchise began with the main series in 2018 on the cable channel Paramount Network. It has since spun-off into several further television series that include two prequel series and two sequel series, which are split across the streaming service Paramount+ and the broadcast network CBS, with further projects in development.

== Television series ==
Five television series make up the Yellowstone franchise: Yellowstone, 1883, 1923, Marshals, and Dutton Ranch. All series in total amount to 106 episodes across 11 seasons of television.

Series	Season	Episodes	Originally released			Showrunner	Status
Series	Season	Episodes	First released	Last released	Network	Showrunner	Status
Yellowstone	1	9	June 20, 2018	August 22, 2018	Paramount Network	Taylor Sheridan	Concluded
Yellowstone	2	10	June 19, 2019	August 28, 2019	Paramount Network	Taylor Sheridan	Concluded
Yellowstone	3	10	June 21, 2020	August 23, 2020	Paramount Network	Taylor Sheridan	Concluded
Yellowstone	4	10	November 7, 2021	January 2, 2022	Paramount Network	Taylor Sheridan	Concluded
Yellowstone	5	14	November 13, 2022	December 15, 2024	Paramount Network	Taylor Sheridan	Concluded
1883	1	10	December 19, 2021	February 27, 2022	Paramount+	Taylor Sheridan	Concluded
1923	1	8	December 18, 2022	February 26, 2023	Paramount+	Taylor Sheridan	Concluded
1923	2	8	February 23, 2025	April 6, 2025	Paramount+	Taylor Sheridan	Concluded
Marshals	1	13	March 1, 2026	May 24, 2026	CBS	Spencer Hudnut	Released
Marshals	2	20	October 4, 2026	TBA	CBS	Spencer Hudnut	Airing
Dutton Ranch	1	9	May 15, 2026	July 3, 2026	Paramount+	Chad Feehan	Released
Dutton Ranch	2	TBA	TBA	TBA	Paramount+	Benjamin Cavell	Pre-production

=== Yellowstone (2018–2024) ===
In 2013, having grown tired of acting, Taylor Sheridan began work on the series and writing screenplays. Having lived in the rural parts of states such as Texas and Wyoming, he set the series in Montana and went about writing the first scripts in Livingston. Sheridan originally wrote Yellowstone as a film, pitching it as "The Godfather in Montana". He initially pitched the series to HBO, but the network declined.

In May 2017, Paramount Network announced that it had greenlit its first scripted series, Yellowstone. Paramount issued a series order for a first season consisting of ten episodes. The series was set to be written, directed, and executive-produced by Sheridan. Other executive producers were to include John Linson, Art Linson, Harvey Weinstein, and David C. Glasser. Production companies involved with the series were set to consist of Linson Entertainment and The Weinstein Company.

In October 2017, it was announced that following reports of sexual abuse allegations against producer Harvey Weinstein, his name would be removed from the series' credits as would The Weinstein Company. In January 2018, Kevin Kay, president of Paramount Network, clarified during the annual Television Critics Association's winter press tour that Yellowstone will not have The Weinstein Company's credits or logo on them, even though that company was involved in production. He stated that their intent is to replace Weinstein Television with the company's new name in the show's credits when available. That same day, it was announced that the series would premiere on June 20, 2018.

In July 2018, it was announced that Paramount Network had renewed the series for a second season that was expected to premiere in 2019. In March 2019, it was announced that the second season would premiere on June 19, 2019. In June 2019, the series was renewed by Paramount for a third season, which premiered on June 21, 2020. In February 2020, Paramount Network renewed the series for a fourth season, ahead of the premiere of its third season. The fourth season premiered on November 7, 2021. In February 2022, Paramount Network renewed the series for a fifth season, which was split into two installments. The fifth season premiered on November 13, 2022. In May 2023, Paramount announced that Costner would be leaving the series at the end of Part 1 of Season 5. The second part of the fifth and final season premiered on November 10, 2024.

=== 1883 (2021–2022) ===
A prequel series, titled 1883 (also marketed on its Blu-ray and DVD release as 1883: A Yellowstone Origin Story) and set during that year, premiered on December 19, 2021, on Paramount+, and concluded after ten episodes on February 27, 2022. In February 2021, the series was announced as part of a five-year deal signed by Sheridan with ViacomCBS and MTV Entertainment Group, under its working title Y: 1883. It focuses on a generation of the Dutton family during the Old West as they undertake the arduous journey across the country before settling the land that would become the Yellowstone Ranch. The series stars Sam Elliott as Shea Brennan, Tim McGraw as James Dutton, Faith Hill as Margaret Dutton, and Isabel May as Elsa Dutton. James is the great-grandfather of John Dutton III. Flashbacks of both James and Margaret Dutton are featured during the fourth season of Yellowstone.

=== 1923 (2022–2025) ===
Another prequel series, titled 1923, and set during that year, was announced in February 2022 and premiered its first season on December 18, 2022, on Paramount+, and concluded on April 6, 2025, after two seasons consisting of sixteen episodes. Initially titled and set in the year 1932, its title and setting was changed to 1923 during development. Being a sequel to 1883, it focuses on a new generation of the Dutton family during the time of Western Expansion, Prohibition, and the Great Depression, which in Montana started a decade earlier. The series stars Helen Mirren as Cara Dutton, Harrison Ford as Jacob Dutton, Brandon Sklenar as Spencer Dutton, and Julia Schlaepfer as Alexandra. Jacob is the great-great-uncle of John Dutton III while Spencer is John's grandfather.

=== Marshals (2026–present) ===
In March 2025, a procedural spinoff series with Yellowstone series regular Luke Grimes set to reprise his role as Kayce Dutton was confirmed to be in active development for CBS. In May 2025, it was ordered to series with the working title Y: Marshals with Spencer Hudnut serving as showrunner and is set to premiere on March 1, 2026, as part of the CBS midseason lineup. In August 2025, Logan Marshall-Green joined the cast in a lead role. Gil Birmingham, Moses Brings Plenty, and Brecken Merrill were confirmed to reprise their respective roles as Thomas Rainwater, Mo, and Tate Dutton respectively while Arielle Kebbel, Ash Santos, Tatanka Means, and Brett Cullen round out the main cast. Filming of the series began in late 2025, taking place in Summit County, Utah, with $52 million designated for production. In January 2026, the title for the series was changed to Marshals.

=== Dutton Ranch (2026–present) ===
In August 2024, a spinoff series titled The Dutton Ranch with Yellowstone series regulars Kelly Reilly and Cole Hauser set to reprise their roles as Beth Dutton and Rip Wheeler was confirmed to be in development in place of a sixth season of Yellowstone. In July 2025, Finn Little was confirmed to reprise his role as Carter in the series. Chad Feehan served as showrunner for the first season. Production of the series began in August 2025, taking place in Ferris, Texas. In March 2026, it was announced that the series had been retitled to simply Dutton Ranch, and that the first season would consist of nine episodes. The series premiered on May 15, 2026. Benjamin Cavell replaced Feehan as showrunner for the second season.

=== In development ===
In February 2023, another prequel series, titled 1944 and set during that year, was reportedly in development. It would serve as a sequel to 1923 and be filmed in the Bitterroot Valley. In February 2026, the series was confirmed to still be in active development, with Paramount aiming for a late-2026 release date.

== Cast and characters ==
Cast and characters of the Yellowstone franchise
Character	Cast member	Series				
Character	Cast member	Yellowstone	1883	1923	Marshals	Dutton Ranch
Shea Brennan	Sam Elliott		Main			
Pete Calvin	Logan Marshall-Green				Main	
Colton	Noah Le Gros		Main			
Banner Creighton	Jerome Flynn			Main		
Andrea Cruz	Ash Santos				Main	
Zane Davis	Brian Geraghty			Main		
Alexandra Dutton	Julia Schlaepfer			Main		
Bethany "Beth" Dutton	Kelly Reilly	Main				Main
Cara Dutton	Helen Mirren			Main		
Elsa Dutton	Isabel May	Guest	Main	Main		
Jack Dutton	Darren Mann			Main		
Jacob Dutton	Harrison Ford			Main		
James Dillard Dutton	Tim McGraw	Guest	Main			
James Michael "Jamie" Dutton	Wes Bentley	Main				
John Dutton I	Jack Michael Duke	Guest				
John Dutton I	Audie Rick		Main			
John Dutton I	James Badge Dale			Guest		
John Dutton III	Kevin Costner	Main				
Kayce Dutton	Luke Grimes	Main			Main	
Margaret Dutton	Faith Hill	Guest	Main			
Monica Long Dutton	Kelsey Asbille	Main				
Spencer Dutton	Charlie Stover	Guest				
Spencer Dutton	Brandon Sklenar			Main		
Spencer Dutton	Gerard Sanders			Guest		
Tate Dutton	Brecken Merrill	Main			Main	
Emily	Kathryn Kelly	Main				
Ennis	Eric Nelsen		Main			
Carter Green	Finn Little	Main				Main
Jimmy Hurdstrom	Jefferson White	Main			Recurring	
Beulah Jackson	Annette Bening					Main
Oreana Jackson	Natalie Alyn Lind					Main
Rob-Will Jackson	Jai Courtney					Main
Joaquin Jackson-Reyes	Juan Pablo Raba					Main
Dan Jenkins	Danny Huston	Main				
Josef	Marc Rissmann		Main			
Miles Kittle	Tatanka Means				Main	
Colby Mayfield	Denim Richards	Main				
Everett McKinney	Ed Harris					Main
Mo	Mo Brings Plenty	Main			Main	
Zachariah Moss	Marc Menchaca					Main
Lynelle Perry	Wendy Moniz	Main				
Lloyd Pierce	Forrie J. Smith	Main				
Teonna Rainwater	Aminah Nieves			Main		
Thomas Rainwater	Gil Birmingham	Main			Main	
Azul Ramos	J.R. Villarreal					Main
Ryan	Ian Bohen	Main				
Belle Skinner	Arielle Kebbel				Main	
Elizabeth "Liz" Strafford	Michelle Randolph			Main		
Teeter	Jennifer Landon	Main				
Thomas	LaMonica Garrett		Main			
Rip Wheeler	Cole Hauser	Main				Main
Wade	James Landry Hébert		Main			
Walker	Ryan Bingham	Main				
Donald Whitfield	Timothy Dalton			Main		

== Reception ==
Critical response of Yellowstone series
Title	Season	Rotten Tomatoes	Metacritic
Yellowstone	1	56% (52 reviews)	54 (27 reviews)
Yellowstone	2	89% (9 reviews)	—N/a
Yellowstone	3	100% (7 reviews)	—N/a
Yellowstone	4	91% (11 reviews)	—N/a
Yellowstone	5	79% (62 reviews)	—N/a
1883	1	89% (27 reviews)	69 (12 reviews)
1923	1	88% (41 reviews)	67 (15 reviews)
1923	2	100% (20 reviews)	79 (6 reviews)
Marshals	1	48% (21 reviews)	57 (12 reviews)
Dutton Ranch	1	83% (24 reviews)	63 (19 reviews)

Following its premiere, the show was met with a mixed response from critics. Metacritic, which uses a weighted average, assigned the first season a score of 54 out of 100 based on 27 critics, indicating "mixed or average reviews". On the review aggregation website Rotten Tomatoes, the first season holds a 56% approval rating, with an average rating of 5.8/10 based on 52 reviews. The website's critical consensus of the first season reads, "Yellowstone proves too melodramatic to be taken seriously, diminishing the effects of the talented cast and beautiful backdrops."

The second season holds an approval rating of 89%, based on 9 reviews. The third season holds an approval rating of 100% based on reviews from 7 critics. The fourth season holds a 91% approval rating based on reviews from 11 critics. The critical consensus for that season reads, "Hitting its stride as a predictably unpredictable oat opera, Yellowstone continues to entertain with its tough-as-rawhide characters and modernized perspective on classic cowboy tropes." The fifth season earned an 84% approval rating based on 38 reviews. The critical consensus for that season reads, "Galloping into the arena of politics with a decidedly nonpartisan bent, Yellowstone enters uncertain territory but remains firmly in the saddle, with Kevin Costner's steadfast presence remaining an invaluable asset."

Viewership of the series has grown with subsequent seasons. The season 3 premiere attracted 7.6 million viewers, and the season 4 premiere tallied 12.7 million viewers. The season 5 premiere garnered 12.1 million viewers. The show has been called a "Heartland drama" and "red state" drama, a label which Sheridan himself disputes.

1883 received generally positive reviews from critics, with particular praise for its performances, cinematography, and realistic depiction of frontier life. On the review aggregator Rotten Tomatoes, the series holds an approval rating of 89% based on 27 reviews, with an average rating of 7.5/10. The website's critics consensus reads: "1883 can feel too overdetermined to be a properly rough-hewn Western, but viewers will want to saddle up for Sam Elliott's commanding star turn." Metacritic, which uses a weighted average, assigned the series a score of 69 out of 100 based on 12 critic reviews, indicating "generally favorable reviews".

In a review for Variety, Daniel D'Addario described 1883 as "stark and unsparing," noting that Taylor Sheridan "leans into misery with a near-perverse glee" in portraying the hardships of westward expansion. Angie Han of The Hollywood Reporter characterized the series as "grim, lyrical, and violent," and praised its production values and sense of scale, while acknowledging its slow pacing. Esquire called the show "a brutally somber and gorgeously shot tale of American beginnings," highlighting the strong emotional core provided by its lead characters.

Common Sense Media emphasized the show's unflinching violence and historical realism, noting that it presents "harsh truths about survival, racism, and the cost of manifest destiny." Decider lauded Elliott's performance, calling him the "emotional anchor" of the series, while Yahoo described his portrayal as "towering and tragic." Brian Tallerico of The Playlist wrote that the show is "unapologetically brutal," and commended its thematic consistency. The A.V. Club praised 1883 for attempting to "rip the rose-colored veneer off American mythology," though it noted that the series occasionally becomes overly self-serious.

In other reviews, The New York Times found the series "visually absorbing" and "emotionally sincere," while also critiquing its "relentless solemnity." CNN described the series as a "gritty, slow-burning Western" that rewards patient viewers with strong character development and high production standards. HistoryNet highlighted the show's attention to historical detail, stating that 1883 presents "a remarkably accurate, if dramatized, portrayal of 19th-century pioneer life."

On the review aggregation website Rotten Tomatoes, 1923 holds an 88% approval rating with an average rating of 7.0/10, based on 41 reviews by critics. The website's consensus reads, "Distinguished by the ineffable star power of Harrison Ford and Helen Mirren, 1923 is another solid if unrelentingly grim addition to Taylor Sheridan's Yellowstone universe." On Metacritic, which uses a weighted average, the series has received a score of 67 out of 100 based on 15 critic reviews, indicating "generally favorable reviews".

According to Paramount, the debut episode brought in 7.4 million viewers in both linear and streaming telecasts, making it Paramount+'s biggest debut ever.

== Cancelled and related or repurposed series ==
In February 2021, a spin-off series, titled 6666, was announced to be in development. It was planned to be set in the present day on the Four Sixes Ranch in Texas and premiere on Paramount Network. The 6666 Ranch is also featured during the fourth and fifth seasons of Yellowstone. In August 2026, Sheridan confirmed that the spin-off was no longer in development.

In May 2022, a spinoff titled 1883: The Bass Reeves Story was ordered to series. However, the series would later be retitled Lawmen: Bass Reeves and was confirmed to no longer be directly related to 1883, and instead was "set in the greater Duttonverse".

In May 2023, following the planned departure of Costner from Yellowstone during the fifth season, a sequel series with the working title 2024 was announced as being in development. In August 2024, it was announced that the series was tentatively retitled The Madison with Michelle Pfeiffer set to star. Production of the first season began in August 2024. The series premiered on March 14, 2026, and was renewed for a second season ahead of the series premiere. In February 2026 it was announced that The Madison would be a stand-alone series no longer set in the Yellowstone universe.

Those two shows, along with the Yellowstone franchise and Sheridan's Mayor of Kingstown, Tulsa King, Lioness, and Landman, are frequently referred to as the "Sheridan-verse".
