= 1923 (TV series) =

American neo-Western TV series by Taylor Sheridan

- Also known as: 1923: A Yellowstone Origin Story
- Genre: Neo-Western; Period drama
- Created by: Taylor Sheridan
- Based on: Yellowstone by: Taylor Sheridan; John Linson
- Written by: Taylor Sheridan
- Directed by: Ben Richardson; Guy Ferland
- Starring: Helen Mirren; Harrison Ford; Brandon Sklenar; Julia Schlaepfer; Jerome Flynn; Darren Mann; Isabel May; Brian Geraghty; Aminah Nieves; Michelle Randolph; Timothy Dalton
- Narrated by: Isabel May
- Composers: Brian Tyler; Breton Vivian
- Country of origin: United States
- Original language: English
- No. of seasons: 2
- No. of episodes: 16

Production
- Executive producers: Taylor Sheridan; John Linson; Art Linson; David C. Glasser; Ron Burkle; Bob Yari; Ben Richardson
- Cinematography: Corrin Hodgson; Ben Richardson; Robert McLachlan
- Editors: Chad Galster; Byron Smith; Christopher Gay; Brooke Rupe; Todd Desrosiers
- Running time: 48–112 minutes
- Production companies: 101 Studios; Linson Entertainment; Bosque Ranch Productions; MTV Entertainment Studios

Original release
- Network: Paramount+
- Release: December 18, 2022 – April 6, 2025

Related
- Yellowstone franchise

1923 is an American neo-Western television series created by Taylor Sheridan that premiered on December 18, 2022, on Paramount+. The series serves as a prequel to Yellowstone (2018–2024), a sequel to 1883 (2021–2022), and is the third television series in the Yellowstone franchise. It stars Helen Mirren, Harrison Ford, Brandon Sklenar, Julia Schlaepfer, Jerome Flynn, Darren Mann, Brian Geraghty, Aminah Nieves, Michelle Randolph, and Timothy Dalton in main roles while Isabel May reprises her role as narrator Elsa Dutton from 1883.

The second and final season premiered on February 23, 2025. The series concluded on April 6, 2025, after two seasons consisting of sixteen episodes.

== Plot ==
The series follows a generation of the Dutton family in 1923, during a time of various hardships including Prohibition, drought, and the early stages of the Great Depression, which affected Montana long before the Wall Street crash of 1929.

== Cast and characters ==
=== Main ===
- Helen Mirren as Cara Dutton, Matriarch of the Dutton family, wife of Jacob Dutton. Having no children, Jacob and Cara raised John Sr. and Spencer Dutton as their own.
- Harrison Ford as Jacob Dutton, Patriarch of the Dutton family, Cara's husband, and older brother of James Dutton (Tim McGraw in 1883).
- Brandon Sklenar as Spencer Dutton, the younger son of James and Margaret Dutton (Faith Hill in 1883). Spencer has witnessed the horrors of World War I and travels British Kenya in Africa tracking big game. Charlie Stover previously portrayed Spencer Dutton as a child during flashbacks set in 1893 in two episodes of the fourth season of Yellowstone. Gerard Sanders (guest season 2), portrays Spencer as an elderly man in a flashforward set in 1969.
- Julia Schlaepfer as Alexandra Dutton, a freethinking woman from the British upper class who encounters Spencer in Africa and later marries him.
- Jerome Flynn as Banner Creighton, a Scottish sheepherder and adversary of the Duttons.
- Darren Mann as Jack Dutton, John Dutton Sr.'s son and only child, James Dutton's grandson, and great-nephew to Jacob Dutton. He is a dedicated rancher who is deeply loyal to his family.
- Isabel May as Elsa Dutton, who serves as the main narrator in the series. May also portrayed Elsa Dutton in 1883.
- Brian Geraghty as Zane Davis, the fiercely loyal ranch foreman of the Dutton ranch.
- Aminah Nieves as Teonna Rainwater, a rebellious young Apsáalooke (Crow) woman who was taken from her family and placed in an American Indian boarding school for girls, which is funded by the United States federal government and run by the Catholic Church.
- Michelle Randolph as Elizabeth "Liz" Strafford, a capable young woman and Jack Dutton's fiancée.
- Timothy Dalton as Donald Whitfield, a powerful, wealthy business tycoon who is accustomed to getting what he wants.

=== Recurring ===
- Robert Patrick as Sheriff William McDowell, the sheriff of Gallatin County and a friend of the Duttons.
- Jennifer Ehle as Sister Mary (season 1), an abusive Irish Catholic nun who teaches at the American Indian boarding school, often coming into conflict with Teonna.
- Sebastian Roché as Father Jacques Renaud, a narcissistic French Roman Catholic priest and the sadistic headmaster of the American Indian boarding school.
- Marley Shelton as Emma Dutton (season 1), the wife of John Dutton Sr. and the mother of Jack Dutton.
- Leenah Robinson as Baapuxti (season 1), a student at the American Indian boarding school and Teonna's cousin.
- Caleb Martin as Dennis, a hired ranch hand working at the Dutton ranch.
- Brian Konowal as Clyde, a Scottish shepherd, a long-time associate of Creighton, and a former Chicago Police Department officer working as a spy for Whitfield.
- Michael Greyeyes as Hank Plenty Clouds (season 1), a Crow shepherd from the Broken Rock Reservation who encounters Teonna while she's on the run.
- Michael Spears as Runs His Horse (season 2; guest season 1), the chief of the Broken Rock Reservation, Teonna's father, and a neighbor to the Duttons.
- Jamie McShane as Marshal Nathan Kent (season 2; guest season 1), a ruthless U.S. Marshal who leads the search for Teonna.
- Cole Brings Plenty (Note: Cole Brings Plenty received an In Memoriam plaque at the beginning of the episode "The Killing Season" following his death in 2024.) (guest season 1) and Jeremy Gauna (season 2) as Pete Plenty Clouds, Hank's teenage son and a sheepherder.
- Joy Osmanski as Alice Davis (née Chow) (season 2; guest season 1), Zane's wife and mother of their two children, who are kept a secret due to anti-miscegenation laws.
- Jennifer Carpenter as Marshal Mamie Fossett (season 2), a U.S. Marshal based in Anadarko who seeks justice after Comanche villagers are killed in her territory.

=== Guest ===
- James Badge Dale as John Dutton Sr. (season 1), the elder son of James and Margaret Dutton, Jacob Dutton's eldest nephew and right-hand man. Audie Rick previously portrayed John Dutton as a child in 1883. Jack Michael Doke portrayed him as a teenager during flashbacks set in 1893 in two episodes of the fourth season of Yellowstone.
- Kerry O'Malley as Sister Alice (season 1), a cruel nun at the American Indian boarding school who takes advantage of those under her care.
- Tim DeKay as Bob Strafford (season 1), Elizabeth's rancher father and a neighbor to the Duttons.
- Nick Boraine as Richard Holland (season 1), the head of a safari tour group in Africa who hires Spencer to hunt man-eaters.
- Alexandra Grossi as Catherine Walsh (season 1), a wealthy British woman in Holland's tour group.
- Bruce Davison as Prince Arthur, Earl of Sussex (season 1), the father of Alexandra's former fiancé and member of the British royal family.
- Amelia Rico as Issaxche Rainwater (season 1), a Crow woman seeking to reunite with her granddaughter Teonna.
- Jo Ellen Pellman as Jennifer, a British socialite and Alexandra's best friend.
- Rafe Soule as Young Arthur (season 1), the son of Prince Arthur and Alexandra's former fiancé.
- Colin Moss as Charles Hardin (season 1), a Colonial British railroad construction supervisor in Tanganyika who hires Spencer to eliminate a man-eating hyena.
- Mark Daneri as Dr. Steven Miller, a physician and friend of the Duttons.
- Colt Brown as Alec, a Scottish shepherd and friend of Creighton.
- Sarah Randall Hunt as Ellie Creighton, Banner Creighton's wife and mother of his son.
- Jessalyn Gilsig as Beverly Strafford (season 1), Elizabeth's mother who is accustomed to city life.
- Peter Stormare as Lucca (season 1), a terminally ill tugboat captain based in Mombasa.
- Tanc Sade, Justin Zachary, and Walker Hare as Brother Cillian, Brother Liam, and Brother Romero (season 1), a trio of Catholic priests sent to track down Teonna.
- Joseph Mawle as Captain Shipley (season 1), the British sea captain of the S.S. Lambridge.
- Ross Crain as Marshal Thomas, a U.S. Marshal and Kent's partner.
- Currie Graham as Chadwick Benton (season 1), an attorney hired by Whitfield to represent Creighton.
- Cailyn Rice and Madison Elise Rogers as Christy and Lindy, a pair of prostitutes hired by Whitfield.
- Wallace Langham as Kyle Murphy (season 1), a loan officer in Bozeman who refuses to authorize a loan for Jacob.
- Damian O'Hare as Captain Hurley (season 1), the sea captain of the RMS Majestic.
- Patrick Burch as Roy Garrett, a judge in Bozeman who oversees Creighton's case.
- Andy Dispensa as Luca Maceo (season 2), an Italian sailor who befriends Spencer while on a ship bound for the United States.
- Gilles Marini as Salvatore "Sal" Maceo (season 2), an Italian gangster and Luca's cousin who runs a bootlegging operation out of Galveston.
- C. Thomas Howell as Anders (season 2), a Texan cowboy who encounters Runs His Horse and hires him to help herd cattle.
- Dougie Hall as Two Spears (season 2), a Comanche reservation officer working with Fossett.
- Brian Letscher as Dr. Shilling (season 2), a physician who administers medical examinations for newly arrived immigrants to the United States.
- Mike Mizwicki as Walter Ridding (season 2), an immigration officer based on Ellis Island.
- Damien Leake as Marvin (season 2), a map seller in New York City.
- James Healy Jr. as Sheriff Hastings (season 2), the sheriff of Fort Worth.
- Hayley McFarland as Mary (season 2), a single mother who shares a room with Alexandra while onboard a long-distance train bound west.
- Janet Montgomery as Hillary (season 2), Paul's wife and a British socialite who takes a liking to Alexandra.
- Augustus Prew as Paul (season 2), Hillary's husband and a wealthy British socialite.
- Chad Doreck as Bernard Anthony (season 2), an upper-class train passenger who sexually assaults Alexandra.
- Virginia Gardner as Mabel (season 2), a prostitute and acquaintance of Lindy.
- Damon Carney as Dr. Andrew Henderson (season 2), a well-educated doctor who treats Alexandra.
- Steve Brudniak as Judge Reading (season 2), a judge presiding over Teonna's trial

== Episodes ==
Season	Episodes	Originally released	
Season	Episodes	First released	Last released
1	8	December 18, 2022	February 26, 2023
2	8	February 23, 2025	April 6, 2025

=== Season 1 (2022–23) ===
No. overall	No. in season	Title	Directed by	Written by	Original release date
1	1	"1923"	Ben Richardson	Taylor Sheridan	December 18, 2022
In a flashforward, Cara Dutton hunts down a man for attacking the Dutton family, and kills him in a standoff. In Africa, her nephew Spencer, a big-game hunter for hire, shoots a rampaging lion, then travels to Nairobi where he is hired to kill a leopard in a safari camp. In Montana, Jacob Dutton and his men pause to observe the destruction of drought and locusts over the grasslands before riding into Bozeman. Jacob presides over a meeting of the Montana Livestock Association, ruling against Scottish ranchers, led by Banner Creighton, who are trespassing on cattle ranches to feed their starving sheep. Back at the Yellowstone ranch, young Jack Dutton is set to marry a neighbor, Elizabeth, but is called on to help run the cattle to higher ground, leaving Cara to smooth things over with the bride's family. In the hills, Jack encounters a herd of sheep, and gets shot at. At a Catholic-run Indian boarding school, Teonna Rainwater suffers physical and mental abuse at the hands of Sister Mary. She fights back, only to face the wrath of the headmaster Father Renaud, and further repercussions from the nuns.
2	2	"Nature's Empty Throne"	Ben Richardson	Taylor Sheridan	December 25, 2022
Jacob and the Yellowstone cowboys save Jack from the sheepherders. They hang five of them as justice for trespassing and for attacking Jack, although Banner manages to escape. Jacob orders the sheep to be driven down the mountainside and handed over to Native American riders to take to their struggling Reservation. Teonna continues to stand up to abuse at the hands of Sister Mary. Her grandmother Issaxche visits the superintendent of government boarding schools, seeking Teonna's custody. In Kenya, after killing a pair of leopards, Spencer meets a British woman named Alexandra, and the two become smitten with each other. She leaves her fiancé and joins Spencer as he heads off on his next assignment in the Serengeti.
3	3	"The War Has Come Home"	Ben Richardson	Taylor Sheridan	January 1, 2023
Jacob and his nephews return to the ranch. Banner stumbles his way back home and gathers the sheep herders to plot revenge against the Duttons. Jacob goes to town and speaks to the sheriff about the herders, while his family observes the modern trappings that Yellowstone National Park is bringing to Bozeman. On their way back to the ranch the next day, they are ambushed by the herders. John is killed, and Jacob and Elizabeth are seriously wounded. Reinforcements arrive and kill the herders, but Banner and several others escape. As the doctor tends to Jacob, Cara writes a letter, at Jacob's request, begging Spencer to come home to defend his family's land. In Africa, Spencer asks Alexandra to marry him and then saves her from a charging elephant and a pride of lions.
4	4	"War and the Turquoise Tide"	Ben Richardson	Taylor Sheridan	January 8, 2023
The fallout from the rifle ambush by the sheep farmers is severe. Jacob is bedridden, while Jack and Elizabeth face her mother's insistence that she move east. With so many of his allies dead, Banner meets with the mining magnate Donald Whitfield to gain support for his war against the Dutton family. Jacob counsels Cara to take over the ranch's affairs, but to leave the fighting for Spencer's return. Telling the group that Jacob has gone to Wyoming to hunt down cattle thieves, Cara represents him at a meeting of the livestock association and convinces the members to agree to Dutton's plan for a new police force. After incessant abuse from Sister Mary, Teonna finally kills her before fleeing the school. Spencer grows closer to his fiancée and receives Cara's letter that a range war is in progress.
5	5	"Ghost of Zebrina"	Guy Ferland	Taylor Sheridan	February 5, 2023
The Dutton ranch settles into a melancholy routine, and John's widow Emma takes her own life. In Africa, Spencer and his fiancée Alexandra begin the long journey to Montana. In Mombasa, hearing that travel by ocean liner would take months, Spencer signs on as a deckhand on a local tugboat that will get him to the Suez Canal, where he will arrange onward passage to America. Alerted that Sisters Mary and Alice have been murdered, Father Renaud brutally interrogates Baapuxti, then sends three priests after her cousin Teonna. In the Badlands, Teonna fends off a wolf and then encounters a Crow shepherd Hank who offers to help her. Banner attaches his fortunes to Whitfield's gold mining plans, as the cattle business declines. Having missed their wedding, Jack and Elizabeth say their vows alone on a hillside. Later, Elizabeth reveals she is pregnant. Jacob slowly recovers from his wounds. Alexandra insists on joining Spencer. On the way to the Suez Canal, their tug boat is struck by an abandoned French cargo ship and capsizes.
6	6	"One Ocean Closer to Destiny"	Guy Ferland	Taylor Sheridan	February 12, 2023
Spencer and Alexandra barely survive the tug boat capsizing in shark-infested waters and are eventually rescued by the S.S. Lambridge, which takes them to Marseille. Its captain agrees to marry them in international waters, offering his wife's ring for the ceremony. Back in Montana, Cara and Sheriff McDowell begin the process of hiring livestock agents. When Cara reluctantly admits that Jacob is alive and on the Dutton ranch, the sheriff visits and warns Jacob that he'll get to the bottom of the herder killings. Jacob's desire for revenge is overtaken by his realization of the mining magnate's intentions to squeeze the Duttons out, and he vows to stop the encroachment. Marshals raid Issaxche's home, killing her while searching for Teonna. Hank gives Teonna male clothing and the name Joe and burns her possessions from the school.
7	7	"The Rule of Five Hundred"	Ben Richardson	Taylor Sheridan	February 19, 2023
Jacob, Jack, and the ranch's posse go with Sheriff McDowell to arrest Banner at the luxurious home given to him by Whitfield. Surprised to see that Jacob is still alive, Banner promises that their war is not over. One of the recently-hired livestock agents informs Whitfield about the situation, who then sends his lawyer to help Banner. Runs His Horse, Teonna's father finds Issaxche dead in her cabin. As he finds the attacker's tracks, Hank's son Pete arrives to inform him that Teonna is in hiding in the Badlands. They end up in a bloody encounter with the priests sent to retrieve her. Two of the priests find Teonna, and Hank saves her, but he is killed. Spencer and Alexandra find themselves in Sicily, where they unexpectedly encounter Alexandra's former fiancé.
8	8	"Nothing Left to Lose"	Ben Richardson	Taylor Sheridan	February 26, 2023
After the priests do not return, Father Renaud and Marshall Kent search for Teonna. Runs His Horse and Pete Plenty Clouds find Teonna and take her south with them. Banner is released without bail, and he and Jacob again threaten each other. Alice, the wife of Dutton ranch foreman Zane, is arrested for miscegenation and Zane is beaten by police. Spencer and Alexandra board the SS Majestic bound for London. Alexandra's former fiancé Arthur angrily harasses the couple before challenging Spencer to a duel, which Spencer wins. However, Arthur attacks him and Spencer throws Arthur overboard in self-defense. Although Spencer is not charged, Arthur's father, the Earl of Sussex, orders the captain to remove him from the vessel at the nearest port. Alexandra learns her parents have arranged for her to return to London and that she cannot leave the ship. Seeing Spencer taken away, she declares she will find him in Bozeman, Montana. Back at the Dutton ranch, Whitfield arrives to announce that he has paid their property tax, and if they cannot pay him back by the end of the year, the deed for the land will default into his possession. Elizabeth suffers a miscarriage.

=== Season 2 (2025) ===
List of 1923 season 2 episodes
No. overall	No. in season	Title	Directed by	Written by	Original release date
9	1	"The Killing Season"	Ben Richardson	Taylor Sheridan	February 23, 2025
10	2	"The Rapist Is Winter"	Ben Richardson	Taylor Sheridan	March 2, 2025
11	3	"Wrap Thee in Terror"	Ben Richardson	Taylor Sheridan	March 9, 2025
12	4	"Journey the Rivers of Iron"	Ben Richardson	Taylor Sheridan	March 16, 2025
13	5	"Only Gunshots to Guide Us"	Ben Richardson	Taylor Sheridan	March 23, 2025
14	6	"The Mountain Teeth of Monsters"	Ben Richardson	Taylor Sheridan	March 30, 2025
15	7	"A Dream and a Memory"	Ben Richardson	Taylor Sheridan	April 6, 2025
16	8	"A Dream and a Memory"	Ben Richardson	Taylor Sheridan	April 6, 2025

== Production ==
=== Development ===
It was announced in February 2022 that a second Yellowstone prequel series had been ordered titled 1932 that would succeed the series 1883. In June, the series was renamed to 1923. In December 2022, Taylor Sheridan explained "No one has had the freedom I've had since Robert Evans ran Paramount," and discussed the 1923 production cost: "I would argue that 1883 was the most expensive first season of a TV show ever made. This was much more expensive. Much more expensive." The series was predicted to cost between $30–35 million per episode. The series was designed to run for two seasons with eight episodes each. In February 2023, the series was renewed for a second season.

=== Writing ===
To establish the continuity of the Dutton family saga that began with 1883, Sheridan continued to use the 1883 character Elsa Dutton, voiced by Isabel May, as the narrator for 1923.

=== Casting ===
In May 2022, Helen Mirren and Harrison Ford were cast to star in the series. They had previously starred together 36 years prior in The Mosquito Coast. Ford, as revealed in a February 2023 interview with James Hibberd of The Hollywood Reporter, took up the offer to play Jacob Dutton despite saying in 2002 that he worked only once a year, citing the COVID-19 pandemic and his commitments to the titular role of the long-delayed Indiana Jones and the Dial of Destiny as reasons why he had not done as much work as he wished and wanted to try new things. As with his role in Shrinking, Ford accepted the role before there was a script, trusting that Sheridan would deliver a good one. In a Deadline Hollywood interview, Sheridan explained he got Ford to fly down in his own plane to Sheridan's ranch, and told him "[the script] ain't written yet and you got to commit to it now. I need to know who I'm writing for... I poured about two bottles of wine down him. He said yes". Then Sheridan continued, "Then came Helen [Mirren], and same thing. Have a glass of wine".

In September 2022, Sebastian Roché, James Badge Dale, Darren Mann, Marley Shelton, Michelle Randolph, Brian Geraghty, Aminah Nieves, and Julia Schlaepfer were added to the cast.

=== Filming ===
Pre-production began in Butte, Montana in July 2022. Filming was scheduled to begin on August 22, also in Butte, since that city was the stand-in for Bozeman, Montana. Principal photography took place across Southwest Montana, with many Montana-set scenes shot in the same locations as Yellowstone. Additional scenes were filmed in Kenya, Malta, South Africa, and Tanzania. Some of the scenes set on the ocean liner, RMS Majestic, were filmed on the RMS Queen Mary, which is now a floating hotel docked in Long Beach, California.

Filming of the second season was delayed due to the 2023 Writers Guild of America strike and the 2023 SAG-AFTRA strike. Filming for the second season began in the Austin, Texas vicinity on July 8, 2024, and concluded on September 26, 2024. Production moved to Butte, Montana in October and continued until the end of November.

== Release ==
The first season of 1923 premiered on December 18, 2022, on Paramount+. The second season premiered on February 23, 2025.

== Reception ==
=== Critical response ===
On the review aggregation website Rotten Tomatoes, Season 1 of 1923 holds an 88% approval rating with an average rating of 7.0/10, based on 41 reviews by critics. The website's consensus reads, "Distinguished by the ineffable star power of Harrison Ford and Helen Mirren, 1923 is another solid if unrelentingly grim addition to Taylor Sheridan's Yellowstone universe." On Metacritic, which uses a weighted average, the first season holds a score of 67 out of 100 based on 15 critic reviews, indicating "generally favorable reviews".

On Rotten Tomatoes, Season 2 holds a score of 100% based on 20 reviews. On Metacritic, Season 2 holds a score of 79 out of 100 based on 6 reviews, also indicating "generally favorable reviews".

According to Paramount, the debut episode brought in 7.4 million viewers in both linear and streaming telecasts, making it Paramount+'s biggest debut ever.

=== Accolades ===
1923 has received several accolades and award nominations over the course of the series. The program as a whole as well as individual seasons have picked up Astra TV, Golden Globe, and Satellite award nominations. Ford, Mirren, and Nieves also gained nominations for their performances, with Mirren winning both Critics' Choice Super and Satellite awards. Ben Richardson has been nominated for both his direction and with Corrin Hodgson for their cinematography; the pair won a Camerimage Golden Frog Award. Production design has also been highlighted with several further nominations resulting from the show's costuming, sets, and locations, and other aspects such as Sheridan's writing and Tyler and Vivan's score. While 1923 has been nominated for Primetime Creative Arts Emmy Awards, the lack of awards at the primary awards show has been noted. The series was submitted and in consideration for some categories such as Outstanding Drama Series and Outstanding Lead Actor and Lead Actress in a Drama Series for Ford and Mirren's acting, although it was not chosen as a nominee, for which many outlets considered the series to have been "snubbed".
