= Dutton Ranch =

American television series

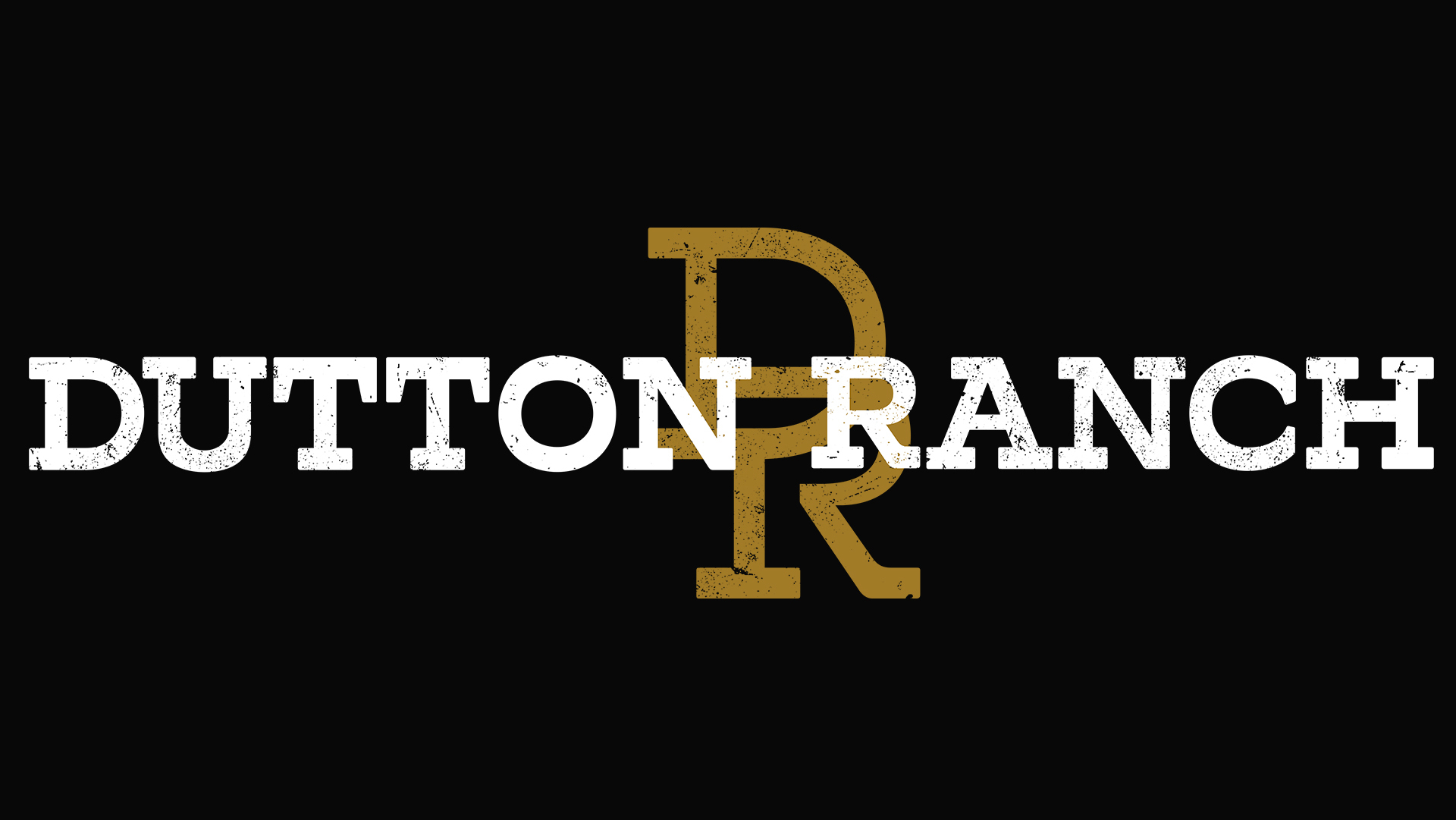
- Genre: Drama; Neo-Western
- Created by: Chad Feehan
- Based on: Characters by: Taylor Sheridan; John Linson
- Showrunner: Chad Feehan
- Starring: Kelly Reilly; Cole Hauser; Finn Little; Juan Pablo Raba; Jai Courtney; J. R. Villarreal; Marc Menchaca; Natalie Alyn Lind; Ed Harris; Annette Bening
- Music by: Brian Tyler & Breton Vivian
- Country of origin: United States
- Original language: English
- No. of seasons: 1
- No. of episodes: 9

Production
- Executive producers: Taylor Sheridan; David C. Glasser; John Linson; Art Linson; Ron Burkle; David Hutkin; Bob Yari; Chad Feehan; Christina Alexandra Voros; Michael Friedman; Cole Hauser; Kelly Reilly
- Running time: 41–59 minutes
- Production companies: Linson Entertainment; Bosque Ranch Productions; 101 Studios; Paramount Television Studios

Original release
- Network: Paramount+
- Release: May 15, 2026 – present

Related
- Yellowstone franchise

Dutton Ranch is an American television series created by Chad Feehan. The series serves as both a spin-off and sequel to Yellowstone (2018–2024) and is the fifth television series in the Yellowstone franchise. It stars Kelly Reilly and Cole Hauser reprising their roles from Yellowstone.

Dutton Ranch premiered on Paramount+ on May 15, 2026, and consists of nine episodes. Feehan departed his role as showrunner before the series' premiere. In June 2026, the series was renewed for a second season, for which Benjamin Cavell will serve as the showrunner.

== Plot ==
In the series, Rip Wheeler and Beth Dutton have moved to South Texas to build a new life for themselves, but this comes with some confrontation from the rival ranch.

== Cast and characters ==
=== Main ===
- Kelly Reilly as Beth Dutton, the only daughter of John Dutton and a well-educated, highly intelligent financier and a master manipulator. Reilly reprises her role from Yellowstone.
- Cole Hauser as Rip Wheeler, Beth's husband who was raised by her father and was the foreman and enforcer of the Yellowstone ranch in Montana. Hauser reprises his role from Yellowstone.
- Finn Little as Carter Green, Beth and Rip's adopted son. Little reprises his role from Yellowstone.
- Juan Pablo Raba as Joaquin “Kino” Jackson Reyes, Beulah Jackson's adopted son and the fixer in the family
- Jai Courtney as Rob-Will Jackson (Season 1), the reckless son of Beulah Jackson
- J. R. Villarreal as Azul Ramos, a ranch hand who works for Rip and Beth
- Marc Menchaca as Zachariah Moss, a ranch hand hired by Rip on Azul's recommendation after being released from prison
- Natalie Alyn Lind as Oreana Lynn Jackson, daughter of Rob-Will Jackson, granddaughter of Beulah Jackson, and Carter's love interest who is meant to inherit the 10 Petal Ranch
- Ed Harris as Everett McKinney, the local veterinarian in Rio Paloma and a Vietnam War Navy veteran
- Annette Bening as Beulah Jackson, the affluent owner of 10 Petal Ranch and the matriarch of the Jackson Family

=== Recurring ===
- Morgan Wade as Carol, a bartender at a local bar
- Berto Colón as Miguel, Beulah's bodyguard and head of security
- David DeLao as Claudio, a butcher who owns Carnes Del Arroyo Seco, whom Beth sought to butcher some cattle at a good rate rather than do business with Beulah
- Ray McKinnon as Dwight White, an old rancher who hired Carter to do some work on his property and keeps a pet leopard
- Josh Stewart as Sheriff Handy Wade, a local lawman in South Texas who keeps "the good, the bad, the ugly" in his back pocket to get what he needs
- Hart Denton as Chet Davis, a young and reckless ranch hand at 10 Petal who was made a foreman and a close friend to Rob-Will. He was later demoted then fired by Rip
- Sterlin English as Austin Lewis, a young ranch hand at 10 Petal who grows to be suspicious of the people he works for after his foreman and friend "disappears"
- Kyle Dondlinger as Hoyt Boone, Oreana's disrespectful cheating ex-boyfriend who is also a competitive steer wrestler
- Raoul Max Trujillo as Mariano Reyes, Joaquin's father and a former 10 Petal ranch hand that was a teenage Beulah's bodyguard. Now a Mexican drug cartel boss partnered with the Jacksons.
  - Bobby Soto as a young Mariano Reyes in flashbacks

== Episodes ==
No.	Title	Directed by	Written by	Original release date
1	"The Untold Want"	Christina Alexandra Voros	Chad Feehan	May 15, 2026
Months after a wildfire destroys their Montana ranch, Beth Dutton and Rip Wheeler begin rebuilding their lives on a new ranch in Rio Paloma, Texas, alongside their adopted son, Carter. While Carter returns to high school to complete his education, Rip oversees the ranch's cattle operations with ranch hand Azul, and Beth manages the business and finances. When affluent ranch and slaughterhouse owner Beulah Jackson attempts to pressure Beth into an exploitative cattle processing arrangement, Beth decides to take their business elsewhere. Meanwhile, Rip has an altercation with Beulah's volatile son, Rob-Will. Unknown to Rip, Rob-Will had murdered Wes, the Jackson ranch foreman, the previous night. Carter is arrested at a rodeo after defending a girl named Oreana from her aggressive boyfriend, and she later bails him out of jail. Beth also forms a connection with local veterinarian Everett McKinney after persuading him to save an injured horse rather than euthanize it. During a morning ride across the ranch, Rip discovers the partially buried body of Wes, the Jackson ranch foreman.
2	"Earn Another Day"	Christina Alexandra Voros	Jacob Forman	May 15, 2026
In a flashback, Beth and Rip purchase their Texas ranch from a widow who reveals that the Jackson family had long sought to acquire the property. In the present, Beulah learns that Wes' body has gone missing and that his wife has begun asking questions, prompting her to instruct her other son Joaquin to make the problem disappear. Rip hires a new ranch hand named Zachariah on Azul's recommendation. Meanwhile, Beth persuades Everett to connect her with an alternative cattle processor and later introduces him to Rip. Elsewhere, Carter spends time after school with the flirtatious Oreana, unaware that she is Beulah's granddaughter and Rob-Will's daughter. Later that night, Rip disposes of Wes' body in a condemned mineshaft.
3	"Act of God Business"	Greg Yaitanes	J. Todd Scott	May 22, 2026
Beth travels to Dallas carrying a freshly cut ribeye and an unconventional sales pitch. Back at the ranch, Rip and Everett discover that one of the calves has contracted foot-and-mouth disease, threatening both the herd and the ranch's future, prompting Rip to place the cattle under quarantine. Rip also defuses a dangerous confrontation after a figure from Zachariah's past arrives at the ranch seeking revenge. Beulah visits the home of Wes' widow, only to discover that she has fled. After skipping school, Carter spends the day with Oreana, including vandalizing her unfaithful boyfriend's truck. Later, Carter takes her back to the ranch where the two end up sleeping together. Upon returning home, Beth discovers that the disease has begun spreading through more of the cattle.
4	"Start with a Bullet"	Greg Yaitanes	Hilary Bettis	May 29, 2026
Beth walks in on Carter and Oreana and learns that Oreana is a Jackson. Beulah and Everett spend time together and lament their missed opportunity for romance. Rip and Beth make the difficult decision to put their entire herd down, and later they exact vengeance on the cattle broker who scammed them into buying a sick bull using forged vet documents. Carter returns home and becomes upset when he realizes that he'd been kept in the dark about their situation.
5	"Peaceful Find Peace"	Jessica Lowrey	KC Scott	June 5, 2026
To make ends meet, Rip begins working for Beulah as her new foreman. He soon fires Chet, a friend and accomplice of Rob-Will, and starts piecing together the events surrounding Wes' disappearance. Carter's new friendship with Dwight is cut tragically short when Sheriff Wade kills Dwight under a false guise of self-defense and later quietly threatens Carter into silence. Beth spends the day investigating Beulah's past before presenting her with an irresistible offer. Rob-Will is released from rehabilitation and meets with Chet. Beth and Rip agree that the Jackson family cannot be trusted.
6	"A Cowboy Saint"	Jessica Lowrey	Hayley Tibbenham	June 12, 2026
Rip brings Azul and Zachariah on as ranch hands at the 10 Petal, where morale improves significantly under his leadership. Beth makes a strong first impression in her new role. Rob-Will continues to lay low at Chet's home and acquires a cache of firearms. He later manipulates Chet into confronting Joaquin, and although Chet manages to shoot him in the hand, the ranch's bodyguard Miguel kills him before he can finish the job. Rip takes the wounded Joaquin to Everett for treatment but stops along the way and successfully intimidates him into revealing the truth about Wes' murder, including that Rob-Will is not expected to return. Over drinks, Beulah delivers a subtle warning to Beth by raising the subject of Jamie Dutton's disappearance.
7	"Den of Sin"	Phil Abraham	Chad Feehan & Jacob Forman	June 19, 2026
Everyone attends the 10 Petal's anniversary soirée, while the ranch hands celebrate separately at a bar under Miguel's watchful eye. Beulah plans to announce her retirement and name Joaquin as her successor, but Rob-Will unexpectedly arrives and privately threatens to kill Joaquin if she leaves the ranch to him. Carter and Oreana end their relationship on bad terms. During her speech, Beulah relents and names Rob-Will as heir to the ranch, leading Joaquin to storm out of the celebration. Heartbroken and intoxicated, Carter damages one of Beulah's prized possessions. During the ensuing commotion, Beulah clutches her shoulder in pain and collapses in front of the guests.
8	"Whiskey Limits"	Phil Abraham	Hilary Bettis & J. Todd Scott	June 26, 2026
Beulah is taken to the hospital, where she is diagnosed with a heart attack. Beth and Rip decide to stop treating Carter with kid gloves and begin training him to become the cowboy he wants to be, despite his hangover. After regaining consciousness, Beulah unsuccessfully tries to persuade Rob-Will and Joaquin to work together. Everett helps Beulah sneak out of the hospital after the two decide to pursue a relationship and takes her to his home. Carter reaches his breaking point after a grueling first day as a ranch hand and leaves the Dutton ranch to be alone. Austin, a disillusioned 10 Petal ranch hand, approaches Zachariah to establish trust before revealing the Jacksons' illegal activities to Beth and Rip, leading them to believe that the Jacksons were responsible for the FMD outbreak. Joaquin reconsiders his loyalty to Beulah and calls his father, asking for help.
9	"El Padrino"	Christina Alexandra Voros	Sean Conway and KC Scott & Hayley Tibbenham	July 3, 2026
Rip and Beth confirm Austin's claims about the Jacksons' criminal activities, while Rob-Will alerts Beulah to their discovery. After learning the truth about the drug-smuggling operation, Everett confronts Beulah and tells her to leave his house. Oreana discovers she is pregnant, reconciles with Carter, and convinces him to run away with her that evening. Mariano, Joaquin's father and the drug lord to whom Beulah is indebted, arrives in Rio Paloma and lays down his terms. Beulah attempts to justify her actions to Beth and Rip, but they send her away with the drugs loaded into her vehicle. Rob-Will tells Mariano that Beth and Rip are in possession of his drugs. After Rob-Will leaves, Mariano orders Joaquin to kill him. Everett joins Rip, Azul, and Zachariah at the ranch as Mariano's men launch an assault, but the attack is swiftly repelled, with Rip capturing the last surviving gunman for questioning. Unable to find Carter, Beth returns to the ranch as Rip and the ranch hands dispose of the bodies in the mineshaft. Oreana's plans to leave are derailed when Rob-Will is fatally shot downstairs by Joaquin. Mariano calls Beth to reveal that Carter has been abducted. Beth informs Rip and they resolve to confront Mariano.

== Production ==
=== Development ===
In August 2024, a spinoff series titled The Dutton Ranch with Yellowstone series regulars Kelly Reilly and Cole Hauser set to reprise their roles as Beth Dutton and Rip Wheeler was confirmed to be in development in place of a sixth season of Yellowstone. Chad Feehan served as showrunner for the first season. In March 2026, it was announced that the series had been retitled to simply Dutton Ranch, and that the first season would consist of nine episodes.

Prior to the series' premiere (but after production of the first season wrapped), the series' creator Chad Feehan departed the project, due to clashes between him, cast members, Taylor Sheridan, and the head of 101 Studios David C. Glasser.

In June 2026, Paramount+ renewed the series for a second season. In the same month, Benjamin Cavell joined as showrunner for the second season.

=== Casting ===
Kelly Reilly and Cole Hauser reprise their roles as Beth Dutton and Rip Wheeler. In July 2025, Finn Little was confirmed to reprise his role as Carter in the series. Annette Bening, Ed Harris, and Jai Courtney were also cast in main roles. Stephen Amell auditioned for the role that ended up being given to Courtney. In October 2025, it was announced that Natalie Alyn Lind, Marc Menchaca, Juan Pablo Raba, and J. R. Villarreal joined the main cast as Oreana, Zachariah, Joaquin, and Azul respectively. In April 2026, it was announced that country singer Morgan Wade had joined the series in a recurring role.

=== Filming ===
Production of the series began in August 2025, taking place in Ferris, Texas. Greg Yaitanes, Jessica Lowrey, Phil Abraham, and Christina Alexandra Voros served as directors, with Voros directing the season premiere and finale episodes.

== Release ==
Dutton Ranch premiered on Paramount+ on May 15, 2026. The series was also broadcast on Paramount Network.

== Reception ==
The review aggregator website Rotten Tomatoes holds an 89% approval rating based on 38 critic reviews, with an average of rated reviews of 6.6/10. The website's critics consensus reads: "Dutton Ranch takes what its predecessor perfected and carries the mantle well in a new town with the same well-worn trappings, perfectly dusted and ripe for entertaining."

Metacritic, which uses a weighted average, gave a score of 63 out of 100 based on 20 critics, indicating "generally favorable" reviews.

M.N. Miller of FandomWire noted: "Pulpy, brooding, and operatic, the latest crime saga in chaps is saddle-worn, volatile, and wildly entertaining, with plenty of dust on its boots and blood on its hands."
