= Aminah Nieves =

American actress (born 1995)

- Born: October 2, 1995 (age 30); Hammond, Indiana
- Occupation: Actress
- Years active: 2021–present

Aminah Nieves is an American actress from Hammond, Indiana, of Taino and Coahuiltecan descent. She is known for her breakthrough performance as Teonna Rainwater in the two seasons of Taylor Sheridan's television drama 1923 (2022–2023, 2025).

== Early life ==
From an early age, Nieves was drawn to performing, and for a time aspired to become a touring symphonic musician.

Nieves’ passion for acting took hold during high school, where a newly opened performing arts school in Hammond allowed her to be part of a theater production. Two months after graduating, she left for New York. For most of the following decade, she struggled to make her way, landing mostly uncredited supporting roles for four or five years.

At some point while living in New York, Nieves was working four jobs at once, trying to make rent. As an herbalist working on her own herbal shop and doing her own practice outside of that. She was also a doula and worked in a clothing store. However, none of that satisfied her, so she moved back home.

== Career ==
While living in New York she starred in a few short and indie films, such as Blueberry and Dogwood.

After moving back in with her parents with only $21 to her name, she remained committed to her craft. With the unwavering support of her manager and family, she took the leap to audition for 1923, despite initial fears about the heavy themes of the role. Her mother's encouragement to embrace the opportunity for the sake of their community played a pivotal role in her decision-making process.

Nieves' performance has not only garnered praise but has also sparked important conversations about the historical injustices faced by indigenous peoples. In an interview with Elle, Nieves said that "a lot of people don't know what happened or deny it happened; some people even think Native Americans don't exist anymore. That's why it's so important to portray our story as honestly as we can, especially on bigger platforms like this, so people can't run away from it anymore. They need to see it."

In May 2026, she was cast in season 2 of Task, an HBO crime drama created by Brad Ingelsby set in the working-class suburbs outside of Philadelphia.

== Filmography ==
=== Film ===
Key
†	Denotes films that have not yet been released

Year	Title	Role	Notes	Ref.
2021	Blueberry	Elsa	Short film	
2022	V/H/S/99	Charissa	segment "Shredding"	
2025	A House of Dynamite	Sergeant Mary Nolan		

=== Television ===
Year	Title	Role	Notes	Ref.
2022–2025	1923	Teonna Rainwater	Main role	
TBA	Task	Nataly Zamora	Recurring role	
