= Finn Little =

Australian actor

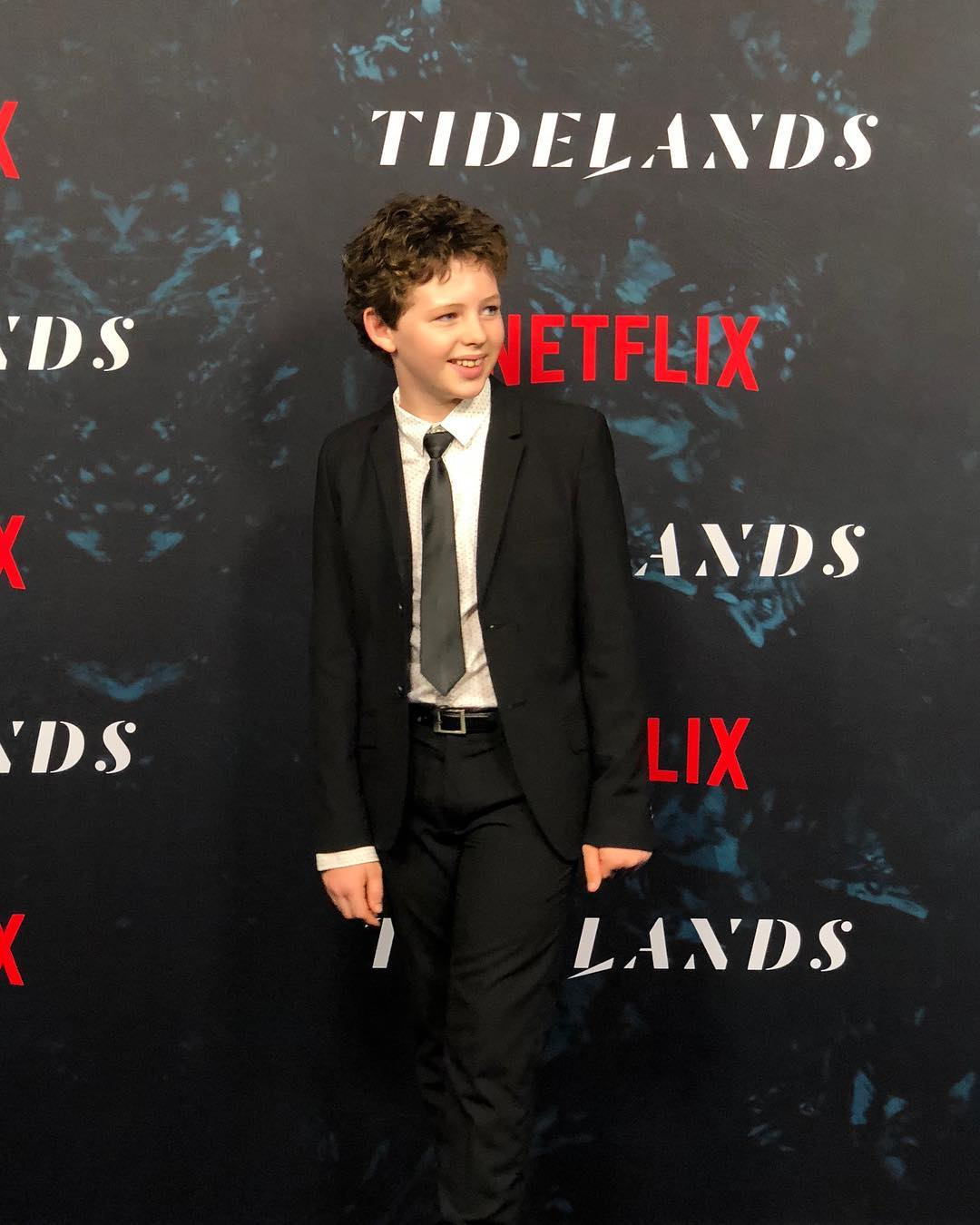
- Born: June 9, 2006 (age 20); Brisbane

Finn Little (born: June 9, 2006) is an Australian actor. He is best known for his role as Carter in Yellowstone and its spin-off Dutton Ranch.

== Biography ==
Little was born in Brisbane, Queensland, Australia in 2006. His younger sister Mackenzie Little is also an actress.

In 2019, he had a role alongside Geoffrey Rush as storm boy in the film Storm Boy.

In 2021, he acted alongside Angelina Jolie in Those Who Wish Me Dead, directed by Taylor Sheridan.

Sheridan who was impressed by Little, gave him a role in his series Yellowstone In 2021, when he started acting as Carter, a young boy who is taken in by Beth Dutton after his drug addict father passes away in a hospital.

In 2024, while his final year of high school, he had a role in the The Surfer, working opposite Nicolas Cage.

In 2026, he returned to his role in the Yellowstone spin-off Dutton Ranch alongside Kelly Reilly and Cole Hauser.

== Filmography ==
=== Film ===
| Year | Title | Role | Notes | Ref. |
|---|---|---|---|---|
| 2016 | Little Kingdom | Young Oliver | short | |
| 2019 | Storm Boy | Storm Boy | | |
| 2019 | Angel of Mine | Thomas | | |
| 2020 | 2067 | Young Ethan Whyte | | |
| 2021 | Those Who Wish Me Dead | Connor Casserly | | |
| 2024 | The Surfer | The Kid | | |

=== Television ===
| Year | Title | Role | Notes | Ref. |
|---|---|---|---|---|
| 2016 | Crafty Kingdom | Butterboy (voice) | | |
| 2018 | Tidelands | Gilles | 6 episodes | |
| 2019–2020 | Reckoning | Jake Serrato | 10 episodes | |
| 2021 | Harrow | Cooper Bryant | 1 episode | |
| 2021–2024 | Yellowstone | Carter Green | Seasons 4-5; 24 episodes | |
| 2026–present | Dutton Ranch | Carter Green | Main cast | |
