= Storm Boy (2019 film) =

2019 film by Shawn Seet

- Theatrical film poster
- Directed by: Shawn Seet
- Written by: Justin Monjo
- Based on: Storm Boy by Colin Thiele
- Produced by: Matthew Street; Michael Boughen
- Starring: Geoffrey Rush; Jai Courtney; Finn Little; Trevor Jamieson; Morgan Davies (Note: Credited as Morgana Davies); Erik Thomson
- Cinematography: Bruce Young
- Edited by: Denise Haratzis
- Music by: Alan John
- Production companies: Screen Australia; Ambience Entertainment; South Australian Film Corporation
- Distributed by: Sony Pictures Releasing
- Release date: 17 January 2019
- Running time: 99 minutes
- Country: Australia
- Language: English
- Box office: $4.2 million

Storm Boy is a 2019 Australian drama family film based on the 1964 novella by Colin Thiele of the same name. The adaptation was directed by Shawn Seet and stars Geoffrey Rush and Jai Courtney. Thiele's novel was previously adapted in 1976.

== Plot ==
Based on the book, Storm Boy follows a young boy growing up on a largely uninhabited coastline of Southern Australia. He rescues three orphan pelicans and forms a close bond with them.

== Cast ==
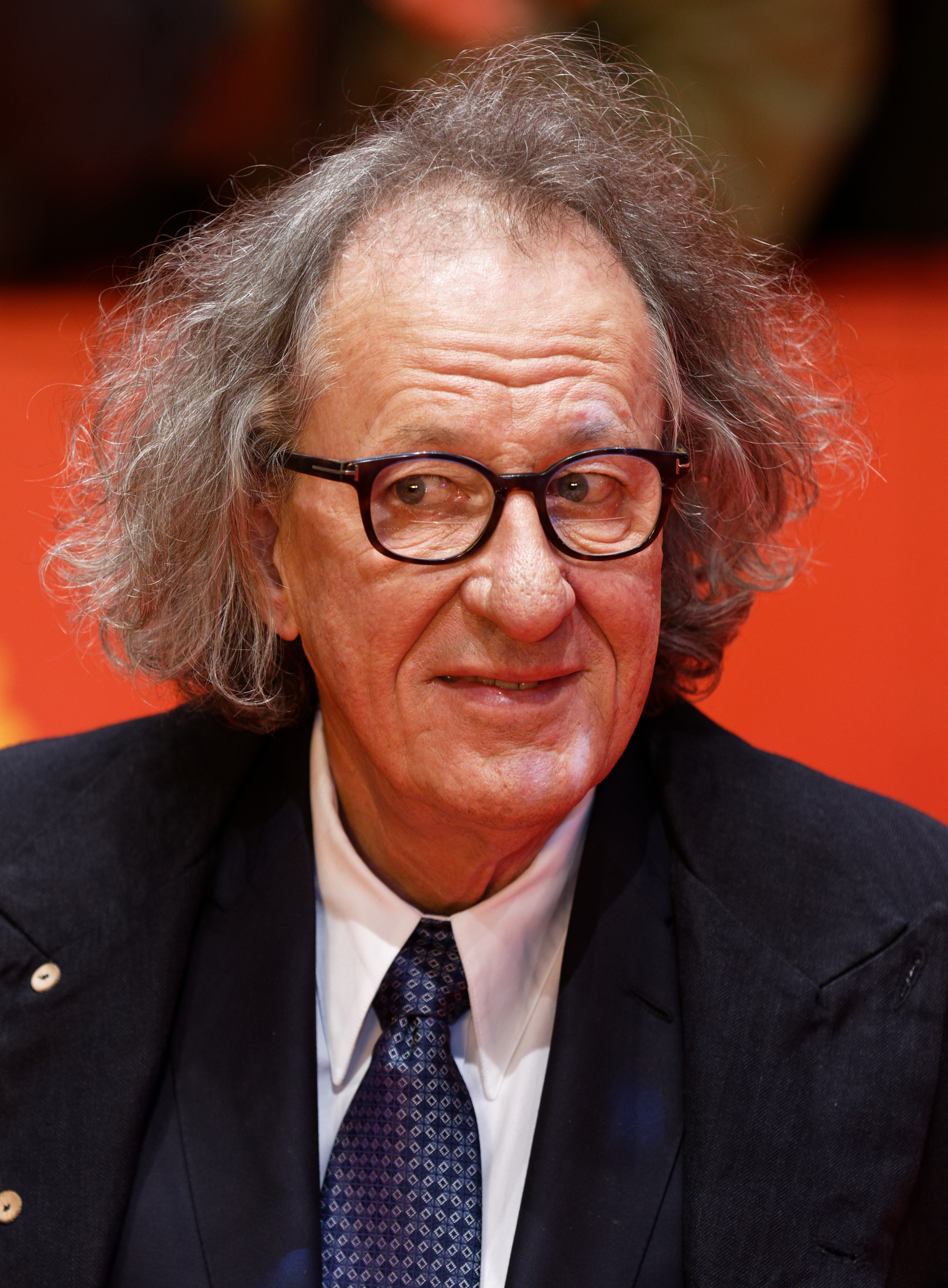
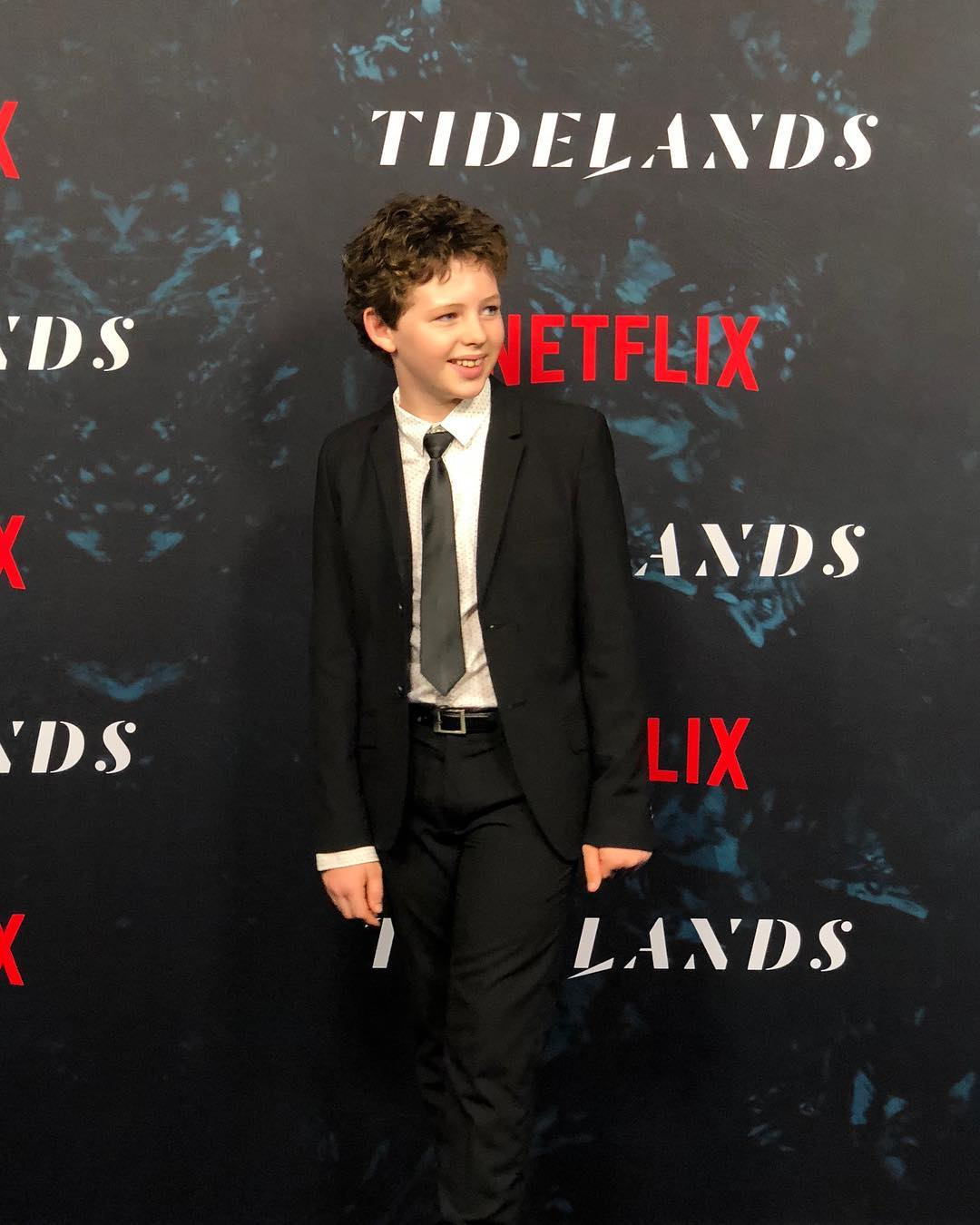
Geoffrey Rush (left) and Finn Little portrays as Michael "Storm Boy"
- Geoffrey Rush as Michael "Storm Boy" Kingley
  - Finn Little as Storm Boy
  - Edward Boehm as Young Storm Boy
- Jai Courtney as Tom "Hideaway Tom"
- Trevor Jamieson as Bill "Fingerbone Bill"
- Morgan Davies as Madeline
- Erik Thomson as Malcom Downer
- David Gulpilil as The Father of Fingerbone Bill
- Simone Annan as Murujuga Lawyer
- Thibul Nettle as Police Officer (as Stinga-T)
- Luca Asta Sardelis as Smirking Schoolgirl #1
- Georgina Giessauf as Smirking Schoolgirl #2
- Amélie Rickman as Smirking Schoolgirl #3
- David John Clark as Police Senior Constable
- Chantal Contouri as Julie Sims
- Martha Lott as Pearl
- Nick Launchbury as Reporter #1
- Emma Bargery as Reporter #2
- Miraede Bhatia-Williams as Mildew
- Brendan Cooney as Police Officer
- Caroline Mignone as Angela
- Anna Bampton as Jenny
- Rory Walker as Murray
- Lucy Cowan as Belle
- Niraj Pandya as Office Receptionist
- Brendan Rock as Hunter #1
- James Smith as Hunter #2
- Bradley Trent Williams as Jasper Davies
- Tim Whibley as Office Worker
- Paul Blackwell as Cal Evans
- Michelle Nightingale as Mrs. Marks
- Natasha Wanganeen as Susan Franklin

== Production ==
Storm Boy, an Ambience Entertainment production, was shot along the Coorong and in Adelaide, South Australia in July–August 2017. The Hudson Hornet used in the filming was supplied by a local South Australian car collector.

== Release ==
The film opened in theatres in Australia and New Zealand on 17 January 2019, in Poland on 19 January 2019 and in the United States on 5 April 2019.

=== Box office ===
The film was released in 320 theatres in Australia on 17 January 2019 but it grossed only $874,000 (USD) on its opening weekend. By the end of its theatrical run in Australia, it had earned a total of $3.5 million. The film also grossed just over $600,000 in Poland and New Zealand when it was released over 17–19 January 2019. The film was released in the United States & Territories on 5 April 2019 but only earned $71,000. The total box-office for Storm Boy was $4.2 million.

=== Critical response ===
On Rotten Tomatoes the film has an approval rating of 68% based on 41 reviews, with an average rating of 6.2/10. The site's critics consensus reads, "Storm Boy can't quite live up to the original, but this retelling of a beloved story retains enough of its classic source material's heart to remain worth a watch." On Metacritic, the film has a weighted average score of 67 out of 100 based on 7 critics, indicating "generally favorable reviews".

=== Awards ===
Award	Category	Subject	Result
Grand Prize	Best Film	Shawn Seet	Nominated
FCCA Awards	Best Original Score	Alan John	Nominated
SPA Award	Best Feature Film Production	Ambience Entertainment	Nominated
Children's Jury Main Prize	Best Children's Performance	Finn Little	Won
