= The Bard (film) =

- Directed by: Kevin Willmott
- Written by: Kevin Willmott; E. Paul Edwards
- Produced by: Kim Zubick; Lauren Vilchik; Roland Waddell; Ksana Golod; Paul Edwards
- Starring: David Gyasi
- Country: United States
- Language: English

The Bard is an upcoming historical drama film written by Kevin Willmott and E. Paul Edwards, directed by Willmott and starring David Gyasi. The film is based on the life of George Moses Horton.

== Cast ==
- David Gyasi as George Moses Horton
- Julia Schlaepfer
- Michael McElhatton
- David Strathairn
- Joseph Lee Anderson
- Jay R. Ferguson
- Adina Porter
- Dylan Arnold

== Production ==
In August 2025, it was announced that Gyasi was cast as Horton, with filming then occurring in North Carolina. Later that same month, it was announced that other actors, including Strathairn, were added to the cast.
