= Jai Courtney =

Australian actor (born 1986)

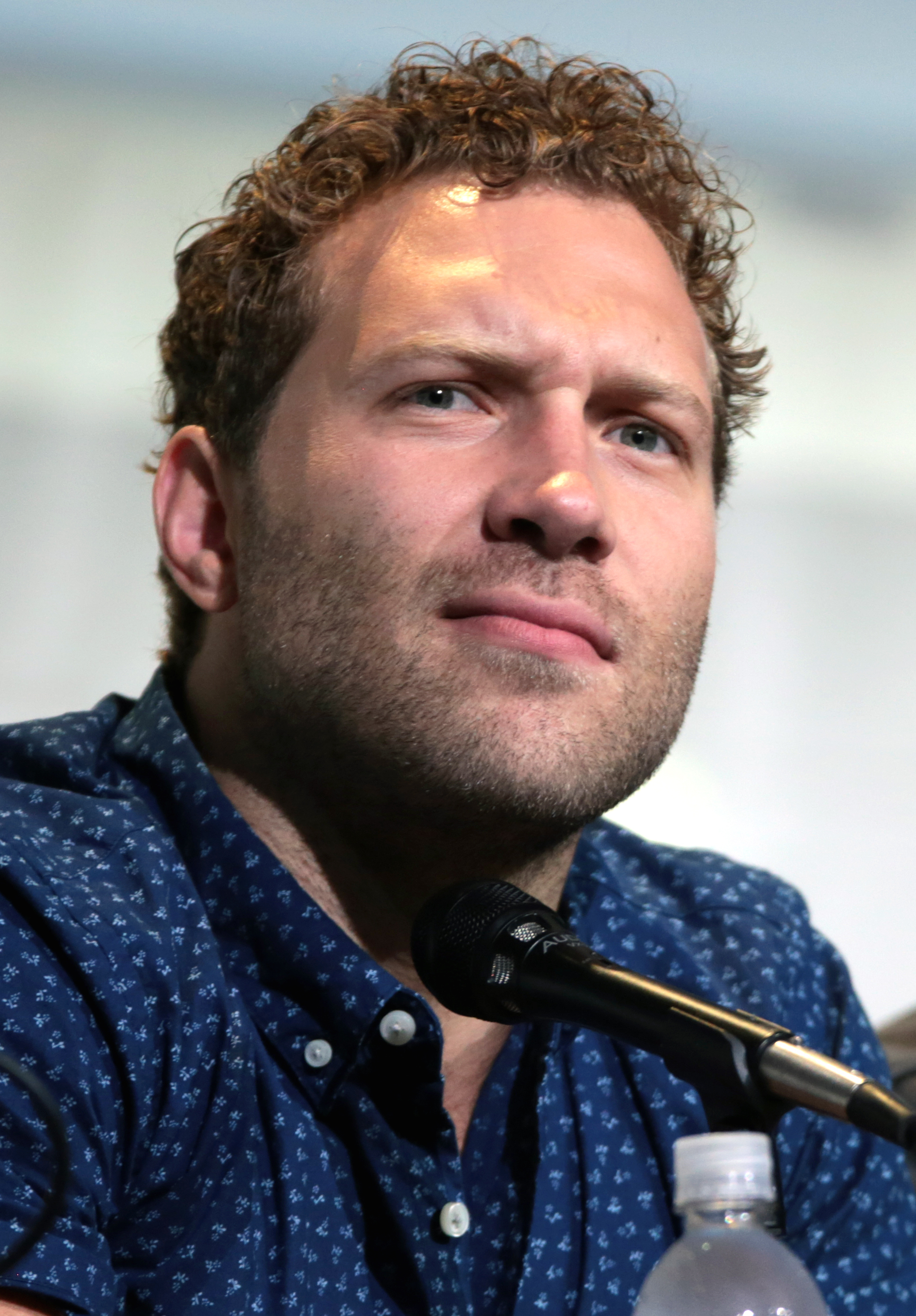
- Courtney in 2016
- Born: Jai Stephen Courtney; 15 March 1986 (age 40)
- Education: Western Australian Academy of Performing Arts, Edith Cowan University
- Occupation: Actor
- Years active: 2005–present
- Partner: Dina Shihabi
- Children: 1

Jai Stephen Courtney (/dʒaɪ/; born 15 March 1986) is an Australian actor. Courtney started his career as a teenager with small roles in film and television, and studied acting at the Western Australian Academy of Performing Arts. After early supporting roles in Hollywood projects, he gained recognition for playing Dauntless leader Eric Coulter in The Divergent Series (2014–2015), Kyle Reese in Terminator Genisys (2015), and supervillain Captain Boomerang in the DC Extended Universe films Suicide Squad (2016), and The Suicide Squad (2021). He played a corrupt debt collector, the main antagonist in the independent film Buffaloed (2019).

Courtney's other notable credits include the Hollywood films I, Frankenstein (2014), Unbroken (2014), and The Exception (2016); the Australian films Felony (2014), The Water Diviner (2014), Storm Boy (2019) and 100% Wolf (2020), and the television series Stateless (2020). He also appeared in The Terminal List (2022) and the 2023 American TV series Kaleidoscope. In 2025, he starred in the survival horror thriller Dangerous Animals.

On stage, he portrayed the title character in the Melbourne Theatre Company's production of Macbeth (2017). He also hosted the Australian reality competition series The Summit in 2023.

== Early life and education ==
Jai Stephen Courtney was born on 15 March 1986.

Courtney played rugby and participated in drama club at school. He attended Cherrybrook Technology High School and the Western Australian Academy of Performing Arts, graduating in 2008. While in college, Courtney took a ballet course and failed.

== Career ==
=== Early work (2005–2013) ===
Courtney's first role was in a 2005 short film titled Boys Grammar, which also starred Daniel Feuerriegel and Adam J. Yeend. In 2008, he played a role in the Australian series Packed to the Rafters, then a guest lead in the popular All Saints, the comedy feature To Hell & Bourke and several short films. In 2010, he played Varro in Spartacus: Blood and Sand for 10 episodes, before starring in Jack Reacher in 2012 with Tom Cruise and in A Good Day to Die Hard with Bruce Willis as John McClane's son, Jack. In 2014, he appeared in the films I, Frankenstein and Felony.

=== 2014–2020 ===
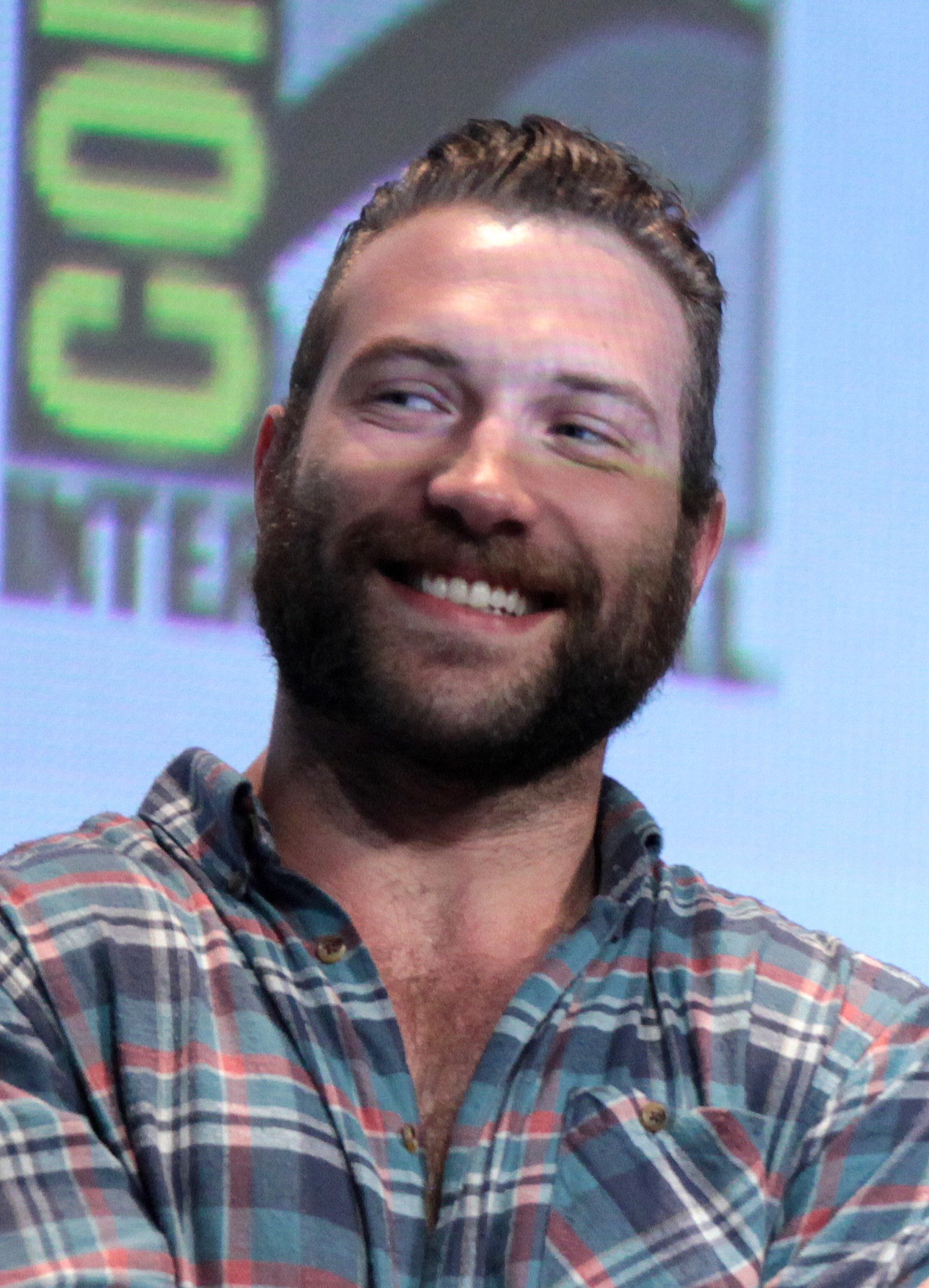
Courtney at the 2015 San Diego Comic-Con

Courtney played Eric, one of the leaders of the faction Dauntless, in the science fiction film Divergent (2014). Later that year, he starred in Unbroken, playing Hugh "Cup" Cuppernell, and The Water Diviner, playing Lt. Col. Hughes. Courtney reprised the role of Eric in Insurgent, a sequel to Divergent, which was released in March 2015. That same year, he played one of the leads, Kyle Reese, in the science fiction action film Terminator Genisys. He worked on Insurgent and Terminator Genisys simultaneously. Terminator Genisys garnered unfavourable reviews and performed poorly at the box office. In his review, Dan Jolin of Empire described Courtney as "too buff and bland" for the role of Reese.

In March 2015, Courtney signed on to play Captain Boomerang in the 2016 DC Extended Universe film Suicide Squad. Critics lambasted the film, with The Washington Post's Michael O'Sullivan writing Courtney "barely registers" in his role. Despite this, it had a commercially successful box office run. In 2017, Courtney starred as the titular character in Melbourne Theatre Company's production of Macbeth. Reviewing the play, Cameron Woodhead of The Sydney Morning Herald highlighted his "imperfect command of the verse". In 2019, Courtney played Wizz, a corrupt debt collector, in the independent crime comedy drama film Buffaloed, co-starring Zoey Deutch and Judy Greer. Released to generally positive reviews from critics, Courtney's performance also garnered praise, with Sheila O'Malley of RogerEbert.com saying he plays the character "with gorgeous sinister sleaze".

Courtney next played a corrupt FBI agent in the thriller film Honest Thief, which was released in October 2020. Alonso Duralde of TheWrap praised his effectiveness in the villainous role. Courtney reprised the role of Captain Boomerang in The Suicide Squad, a standalone sequel to Suicide Squad. The film was released in August 2021 to a positive critical reception.

=== 2022–present ===
Courtney stars in the 2022 action thriller film Black Site as well as the thriller series The Terminal List and Kaleidoscope (under the working title Jigsaw).

He stars in the debut feature film directed by Australian filmmaker Dario Russo, The Fox, which premiered at the 2025 Adelaide Film Festival. It also stars Emily Browning, Damon Herriman, and the voices of Sam Neill and Olivia Colman.

== Other activities ==
Courtney provided backing vocals on the Pinch Hitter song "All of a Sudden" from their debut album, When Friends Die in Accidents.

== Personal life ==
Courtney dated Australian actress Gemma Pranita for eight years before splitting in 2013. From 2015 to 2022, he dated Adelaide-born Mecki Dent.

Since 2022, he has been in a relationship with Saudi actress Dina Shihabi, with whom he has a daughter born in May 2023.

Courtney has a number of tattoos, including a rope, a skull, and a dog. His Suicide Squad co-star, Margot Robbie, gave him a tattoo of the abbreviation for Robbie's home state Queensland, QLD, after Courtney had lost a bet with her about a rugby league game. A former smoker, he said in 2019 he had quit years prior.

== Filmography ==
=== Film ===
Year	Title	Role	Notes
2009	Stone Bros.	Eric	
2012	Jack Reacher	Charlie	
2013	A Good Day to Die Hard	CIA Agent John "Jack" McClane Jr.	
2014	I, Frankenstein	Gideon	
2014	Divergent	Eric Coulter	
2014	Felony	Jim Melic	Nominated – Australian Film Critics Association Award for Best Actor in a Supporting Role; Nominated – Film Critics Circle of Australia Award for Best Actor - Supporting Role
2014	Unbroken	Hugh "Cup" Cuppernell	
2014	The Water Diviner	Lieutenant Colonel Cyril Hughes	
2015	The Divergent Series: Insurgent	Eric Coulter	
2015	Terminator Genisys	Kyle Reese	
2015	Man Down	Devin Roberts	
2016	Suicide Squad	George "Digger" Harkness / Captain Boomerang	
2016	The Exception	Captain Stefan Brandt	
2019	Storm Boy	Tom "Hideaway Tom"	
2019	Alita: Battle Angel	Jashugan	Uncredited
2019	Semper Fi	Officer Chris "Cal" Callahan	
2019	Buffaloed	"Wizz"	
2020	100% Wolf	Flasheart	Voice
2020	Honest Thief	Agent John Nivens	
2021	Jolt	Justin	
2021	The Suicide Squad	George "Digger" Harkness / Captain Boomerang	
2022	Black Site	Raymond Miller	
2023	Catching Dust	Clyde	
2024	Runt	Bryan Shearer	
2025	Dangerous Animals	Tucker	
2025	The Fox	Nick	Directed by Dario Russo; premieres 19 October 2025
2026	War Machine	Staff Sergeant 81's brother	
TBA	Protecting Jared		Filming

=== Television ===
Year	Title	Role	Notes
2008	All Saints	Harry Avent	2 episodes
2008–2009	Packed to the Rafters	Damian	2 episodes
2010	Spartacus: Blood and Sand	Varro	10 episodes
2017	Wet Hot American Summer: Ten Years Later	Garth MacArthur	4 episodes
2020	Stateless	Cam Sandford	6 episodes
2022	Love, Death & Robots	Spencer	Episode: "In Vaulted Halls Entombed"
2022	The Terminal List	Steve Horn	3 episodes
2023	Kaleidoscope	Bob Goodwin	Main role
2023	The Summit	Himself	Host
2025	American Primeval	Virgil Cutter	Miniseries
2026	Dutton Ranch	Rob-Will	9 episodes

=== Theatre ===
Year	Title	Role	Venue
2017	Macbeth	Macbeth	Melbourne Theatre Company
