= Christina Alexandra Voros =

American cinematographer (born 1977)

- Born: Christina Alexandra Voros; August 18, 1977 (age 48); Cambridge, Massachusetts, U.S.
- Education: Harvard University; New York University (MFA)
- Occupations: Cinematographer; director; producer
- Years active: 2005–present
- Spouse: Jason Owen (m. 2015)
- Website: christinavoros.com

Christina Alexandra Voros (born August 18, 1977) is an American cinematographer, director, and producer. She is best known for her work on the Western television series Yellowstone (2018–2024) and 1883 (2021–2022), the latter of which earned her a Primetime Emmy Award nomination.

== Early life and career ==
Voros was born to Hungarian refugees from Budapest who fled during the Hungarian Revolution of 1956; she herself has dual American-Hungarian citizenship. She was raised in Cambridge, Massachusetts, where she was a fencer in her youth. She studied at Harvard University and later received a graduate degree from New York University Tisch School of the Arts.

In 2021, she received the Patsy Montana Award from the National Cowgirl Museum and Hall of Fame.

== Personal life ==
Voros married Jason Owen, a film wrangler, in 2015. They live in Texas.

== Filmography ==
=== Film ===
Year	Title	Director	Cinematographer	Notes	Ref.
2007	The Ladies	Yes	Yes	Short film	
2009	The Feast of Stephen	No	Yes	Short film	
2010	127 Hours: An Extraordinary View	Yes	Yes	Short film	
2010	Saturday Night	No	Yes		
2011	The Broken Tower	No	Yes		
2011	Sal	No	Yes		
2012	The Letter	No	Yes		
2013	Kink	Yes	Yes		
2013	The Director: An Evolution in Three Acts	Yes	Yes		
2013	As I Lay Dying	No	Yes		
2013	Child of God	No	Yes		
2013	Chasing Tommy Ton	Yes	Yes	Short film	
2015	Anesthesia	No	Yes		
2017	Metamorphosis: Junior Year	No	Yes		
2017	Trouble	No	Yes		
2019	Ma	No	Yes		
2021	Breaking News in Yuba County	No	Yes		

=== Television ===
Year	Title	Director	Cinematographer	Notes	Ref.
2016	Mother, May I Sleep with Danger?	No	Yes	Television film	
2017	Queen Sugar	Yes	No		
2020–2024	Yellowstone	Yes	Yes	Also executive producer	
2020	Filthy Rich	Yes	Yes		
2021–2022	1883	Yes	Yes		
2021–2022	Big Sky	Yes	No		
2023	Lawmen: Bass Reeves	Yes	Yes	Also executive producer	
2026–present	The Madison	Yes	Yes	Also executive producer	
2026	Dutton Ranch	Yes	Yes	Also executive producer	
TBA	Frisco King	Yes	No	Also executive producer	

== Awards and nominations ==
Award	Year	Category	Nominated work	Result	Ref.
Babelgum Online Film Festival	2009	Best Documentary	The Ladies	Won	
GenArt Film Festival	2008	Best Short Film	The Ladies	Won	
Primetime Emmy Awards	2022	Outstanding Cinematography For A Limited Or Anthology Series Or Movie	1883 (for "Lightning Yellow Hair")	Nominated	
Seattle International Film Festival	2008	Short Film Competition Special Jury Award	The Ladies	Won	
Slamdance Film Festival	2008	Grand Jury Prize: Documentary Short	The Ladies	Won	
Western Heritage Awards	2025	Fictional Television Drama	Yellowstone (for "Desire Is All You Need")	Won	
Women's Image Network Awards	2022	Scripted Show Director	1883	Nominated	
