= Julia Schlaepfer =

American actress (born 1995)

- Born: Julia Nicole Schlaepfer; March 3, 1995 (age 31); Redmond, Washington, U.S.
- Education: Lakeside High School; New York University College of Arts and Science
- Occupation: Actress
- Years active: 2017–present

Julia Nicole Schlaepfer (born March 3, 1995) is an American actress, best known as Alice Charles in The Politician (2019–2020) and Alexandra Dutton in 1923 (2023–2025).

== Early life and career ==
Born on March 3, 1995, at the Group Health Eastside Hospital in Redmond, Washington, and raised in Woodinville and Bellevue, Schlaepfer is one of at least three children born to Lesli (née Boyer) and Phil Schlaepfer.

A ballerina with Seattle's Pacific Northwest Ballet for 12 years, Schlaepfer graduated in 2013 from Lakeside High School, whose drama teacher Alban Dennis she credits for having "got[ten] me into acting", adding, "I wouldn’t be here without him." She continued her studies at the Atlantic Acting School at New York University Tisch School of the Arts, and graduated in 2017 on the Dean’s List.

== Filmography ==
=== Television ===
Year	Title	Role	Notes
2017	Madam Secretary	Ashley Whittaker	1 episode
2018	Instinct	Maggie Fallon	1 episode
2019–2020	The Politician	Alice Charles	15 episodes
2022	American Horror Stories	Celeste	1 episode
2022–2025	1923	Alexandra Dutton	15 episodes

=== Film ===
Year	Title	Role	Notes
2018	Charlie Says	Sandra Good	
2022	The Sky Is Everywhere	Rachel Brazile	
2025	The Bard	Caroline Hentz	
TBA	Rooster		Post-production
