= Factions of Divergent =

Societal divisions in the Divergent fictional universe

In the Divergent book trilogy and film series, factions are societal divisions in a post-apocalyptic Chicago that classify citizens based on their aptitudes and values. The factions are Dauntless, Amity, Erudite, Abnegation, and Candor. Each faction was formed under the belief that one of its dedications will fix all the world's problems. On an appointed day every year, 16-year-olds select the faction to which they will devote the rest of their lives after they take a placement test by dropping their own blood into a substance.

- The Dauntless are the brave who believe cowardice is the source of humans' problems. They are the soldiers and police who protect the city. Their chosen color is black, their symbol is fire, and their substance in the Choosing Ceremony is lit coal.
- The Amity are the peaceful who believe war is the cause of humans' problems. They mainly work as farmers, but they can also be counselors and caretakers. Their chosen color is red (though they also wear yellow), their symbol is a tree, and their substance in the Choosing Ceremony is soil.
- The Erudite are the intelligent who believe ignorance is the cause of human problems. They make up the librarians, doctors, scientists, engineers, economists, and teachers. Their chosen color is blue, their symbol is an eye, and their substance in the Choosing Ceremony is water.
- The Abnegation are the selfless who believe greed is the source of all the world's problems. They are in charge of the government. Their chosen color is gray, their symbol is one hand reaching out to another, and their substance in the Choosing Ceremony are smooth gray stones.
- The Candor are the honest who believe deception is the cause of human problems. They are in charge of the law. Their chosen colors are black and white, their symbol is a set of unbalanced scales, and their substance in the Choosing Ceremony is glass.

In an interview, Veronica Roth describes the factions to have expanded from her initial conception when she did world building. She added Candor to fill "a gap in the reasoning behind the world that needed to be filled."

Many reviews for the Divergent novels criticize the social structures that create the factions within the novel. For example, the Kirkus Reviews on the first novel called the social structure a "preposterous premise."
