= Cole Hauser =

American actor (born 1975)

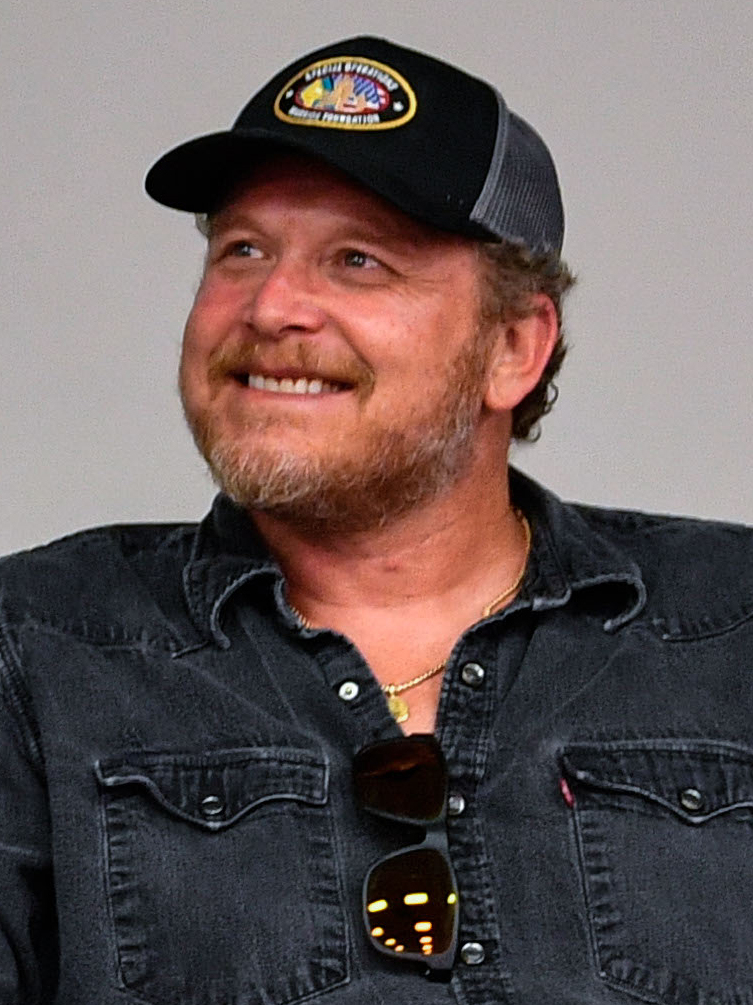
- Hauser in 2024
- Born: Cole Kenneth Hauser; March 22, 1975 (age 51); Santa Barbara, California, U.S.
- Occupation: Actor
- Years active: 1992–present
- Spouse: Cynthia Daniel (m. 2006)
- Children: 3
- Parents: Wings Hauser (father); Cass Warner Sperling (mother)
- Relatives: Dwight Hauser (paternal grandfather); Milton Sperling (maternal grandfather); Harry Warner (great-grandfather)

Cole Kenneth Hauser (born March 22, 1975) is an American actor. He is known for film roles in Higher Learning, School Ties, Dazed and Confused, Good Will Hunting, Pitch Black, Tigerland, Hart's War, Tears of the Sun, The Family that Preys, 2 Fast 2 Furious, The Cave, The Break-Up, A Good Day to Die Hard, Olympus Has Fallen, and Transcendence. He was nominated for the Independent Spirit Award for Best Supporting Male for his performance in Tigerland.

On television, he starred as Officer Randy Willitz on the police crime drama series High Incident, Ethan Kelly on the police drama Rogue, and as Rip Wheeler on the Paramount Network western drama series Yellowstone (2018-2024) and the Paramount+ series Dutton Ranch.

== Early life ==
Cole Hauser is the son of Cass Warner, who founded the film production company Warner Sisters, and actor Wings Hauser. His paternal grandfather was screenwriter Dwight Hauser. One of Cole's maternal great-grandfathers was film mogul Harry Warner, a founding partner of Warner Bros., and his maternal grandfather was Milton Sperling, a Hollywood screenwriter and independent film producer. Hauser's maternal grandmother, Betty Mae Warner, a painter, sculptor, political activist and gallery owner, was married to Stanley Sheinbaum, a political activist, economist, philanthropist, and a former Los Angeles Police Department commissioner. Hauser is of German and Irish descent on his father's side and Jewish on his mother's.

Hauser's parents divorced in 1977, when he was two years old. According to him, at roughly fifteen, he first met his father after the relocation-induced years of separation. His father took him in for a year and taught him about auditioning. Prior to that, his mother had moved Hauser and his half-brother and sisters from Santa Barbara to Oregon to Florida and then back to Santa Barbara within a 12-year span. At the time, he participated heavily in sports, but half-heartedly pursued school. He was admitted to the short-listed circle of talent at a talent summer camp in the Catskill Mountains-Stagedoor Manor Performing Arts Center, then won the leading role in the stage play Dark of the Moon, which earned him standing ovations. At 16 years old, he left high school to act.

== Career ==
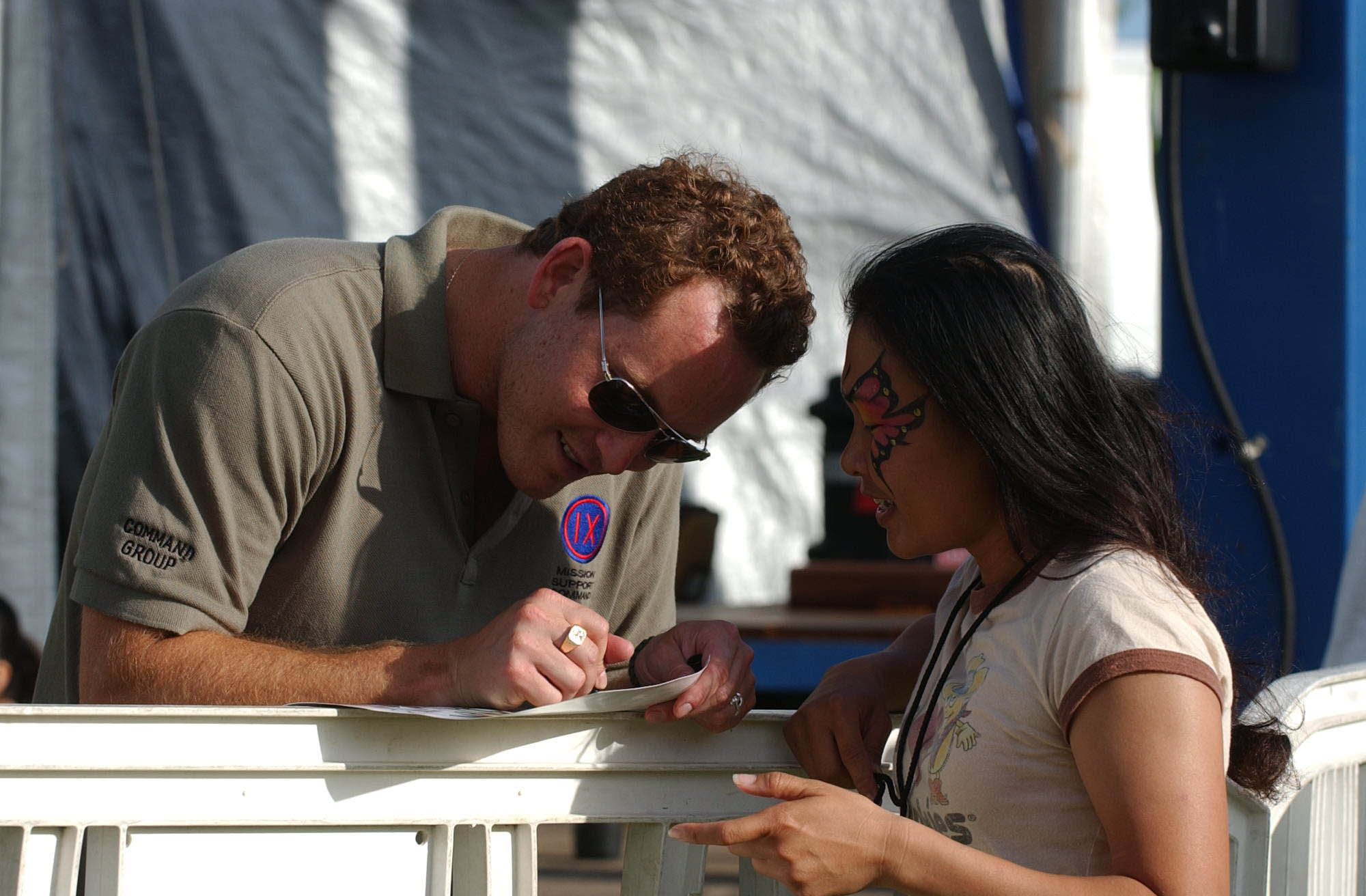
Hauser in 2008

Hauser made his film debut in School Ties (1992), which starred many young and up-and-coming actors such as Brendan Fraser, Matt Damon, Chris O'Donnell and Ben Affleck. A role in Richard Linklater's Dazed and Confused, also starring Affleck, came along subsequently. In 1995, Hauser played the role of the leader of the campus neo-Nazi skinheads in the John Singleton film Higher Learning. Hauser would later re-team with Affleck and Damon when they appeared together in Good Will Hunting (1997). In 2000 he played William J. Johns in Pitch Black and voiced the character in the prequel video game.

In 2002, he played a racist American prisoner-of-war in Hart's War with Bruce Willis and Colin Farrell. Then in 2003, he played a Navy SEAL in Tears of the Sun alongside Bruce Willis. He also appeared as a mob boss in 2 Fast 2 Furious. He has since had several leading roles in Hollywood films, including the Mel Gibson-produced Paparazzi and The Cave.

In 2007, he starred with Anthony Anderson in the FOX series K-Ville. The show was canceled after ten episodes. That same year, Hauser starred in The Stone Angel adapted from a novel by Margaret Laurence. The film played in various festival circles and had a limited release in Canadian theaters in May 2008. During that same year, Cole filmed other indie productions such as Like Dandelion Dust from a novel by Karen Kingsbury, Tyler Perry's The Family That Preys and the CBS television pilot The Tower.

He later played CIA Agent Mike Collins in A Good Day to Die Hard, Secret Service Special Agent Roma in Olympus Has Fallen, and Colonel Stevens in Transcendence.

He starred as Ethan Kelly on the police drama series Rogue and Rip Wheeler on the Paramount Network Western drama series Yellowstone.

== Personal life ==
Hauser is married to Cynthia Daniel, a photographer and actress. She is known for having played Elizabeth Wakefield in the 1990s television series Sweet Valley High, but is mostly retired from acting as an adult. Hauser and Daniel began dating in the 1990s and wed in 2006. They have three children.

== Filmography ==
=== Film ===
Year	Title	Role	Notes
1992	Frame-Up II: The Cover-Up	Cal	
1992	School Ties	Jack Connors	
1993	Dazed and Confused	Benny O'Donnell	
1994	Skins	Bentz	
1995	Higher Learning	Scott Moss	
1997	All Over Me	Mark	
1997	Good Will Hunting	Billy McBride	
1998	Scotch and Milk	Johnny	
1998	The Hi-Lo Country	Little Boy Matson	
2000	Pitch Black	William J. Johns	
2000	A Shot at Glory	Kelsey O'Brian	
2000	Tigerland	Staff Sergeant Cota	
2002	Hart's War	Staff Sergeant Vic W. Bedford	
2002	White Oleander	Ray Pruitt	
2003	Tears of the Sun	James "Red" Atkins	
2003	2 Fast 2 Furious	Carter Verone	
2004	Paparazzi	Bo Laramie	
2005	The Cave	Jack McAllister	
2005	Dirty	Lieutenant	
2006	The Break-Up	Lupus Grobowski	
2007	The Stone Angel	Young Bram Shipley	
2008	Tortured	Kevin Cole	
2008	The Family That Preys	William Cartwright	
2009	Like Dandelion Dust	Jack Campbell	
2010	Shadows of the White Nights	Borris	
2011	The Hit List	Allan Campbell	
2013	A Good Day to Die Hard	CIA Agent Mike Collins	
2013	Olympus Has Fallen	Secret Service Special Agent Roma	
2013	Assassins Run	Roman	aka White Swan
2014	Transcendence	Colonel Stevens	
2014	Jarhead 2: Field of Fire	Special Operations Senior Chief Fox	
2018	Acts of Violence	Deklan MacGregor	
2019	Running with the Devil	The Executioner	
2020	The Last Champion	John Wright	
2022	Panama	Becker	
2022	The Minute You Wake Up Dead	Russ Potter	
2023	The Ritual Killer	Detective Lucas Boyd	
2023	Dead Man's Hand	Roy McCutheon	

=== Television ===
Year	Title	Role	Notes
1993	A Matter of Justice	Private Ralph G. "Rocky" Jackson	Television film (NBC)
1996	High Incident	Officer Randy Willitz	Main role
2004	ER	Steve Curtis	4 episodes (season 10)
2006	Damages	Jack Shale	Unsold television pilot (FOX)
2007–2008	K-Ville	Trevor Cobb	Main role
2008	The Tower	Sean Castleman	Unsold television pilot (CBS)
2009	Washington Field	SSA Raymond Stone	Television film (CBS)
2010	Chase	Jimmy Godfrey	Main role
2014–2017	Rogue	Ethan Kelly	Main role (seasons 2–4)
2015	The Lizzie Borden Chronicles	Charles Siringo	Main role
2018–2024	Yellowstone	Rip Wheeler	Main role
2026	Dutton Ranch	Rip Wheeler	Main role

=== Video game ===
- The Chronicles of Riddick: Escape from Butcher Bay (2004), as William J. Johns (voice role)

== Awards and nominations ==
Year	Award	Category	Work	Result	Ref
2001	Independent Spirit Award	Best Supporting Male	Tigerland	Nominated	
2003	Young Hollywood Awards	Breakthrough Performance – Male	Himself	Won	
2024	Screen Actors Guild Awards	Outstanding Performance by an Ensemble in a Drama Series	Yellowstone	Nominated	
