= Taylor Sheridan =

American television writer and producer (born 1970)

- Born: Sheridan Taylor Gibler Jr. May 21, 1970 (age 56); Chapel Hill, North Carolina, U.S.
- Education: Texas State University (dropped out, and later awarded honorary doctorate)
- Occupations: Writer; producer; director; actor
- Years active: 1995–present
- Spouse: Nicole Muirbrook (m. 2013)
- Children: 1

Sheridan Taylor Gibler Jr. (born May 21, 1970), known professionally as Taylor Sheridan, is an American writer, producer, director, and actor. He is best known as the co-creator of the television series Yellowstone and creator of its prequels 1883 (2021) and 1923 (2022).

Sheridan has written several films, including the screenplay for Sicario (2015), for which he was nominated for the Writers Guild of America Award for Best Original Screenplay. He was nominated for the Academy Award for Best Original Screenplay for Hell or High Water (2016), which was nominated for three other Oscars, including Best Picture. Sheridan also wrote and directed the 2017 neo-Western crime film Wind River and wrote the 2018 sequel to Sicario.

Sheridan got his start portraying Danny Boyd in Veronica Mars (2005–2007) as well as portraying David Hale in the FX television series Sons of Anarchy. He has since created several series for Paramount+, including the crime thriller Mayor of Kingstown, the crime drama Tulsa King (which he co-writes with Terence Winter), the espionage thriller Lioness and the drama Landman.

In 2021, Sheridan was inducted into the Texas Cowboy Hall of Fame. In 2024, Sheridan was inducted into the Texas Business Hall of Fame. He is an honorary graduate of Texas Christian University. He was also awarded an honorary doctorate by Texas State University.

== Early life and education ==
Sheridan was born in Chapel Hill, North Carolina. Several news articles have reported that he grew up on a ranch in Cranfills Gap, Texas, but he was raised in Fort Worth, Texas, the son of a cardiologist. His cowboy identity comes from his mother, who was originally from Waco and loved visiting her grandparents' ranch in that area. When Sheridan was eight years old, his mother insisted on buying a ranch in Cranfills Gap so that her children would "learn firsthand about the peaceful feeling of freedom in nature". Sheridan learned how to be a cowboy during his family's frequent visits to the Cranfills Gap ranch when he was growing up in the late 1980s. Meanwhile, he attended and graduated from R. L. Paschal High School, where he was "the rare weekend wrangler who was also a theater kid".

Sheridan attended Louisiana State University in the fall of 1987 where he was a member of Kappa Sigma Fraternity before transferring to Texas State University as a Theater Arts major but dropped out after his junior year. He later moved to Austin, where he supported himself by mowing lawns and painting houses. While looking for jobs in a shopping mall, Sheridan met a talent scout, who offered him the chance to go to Chicago and pursue an acting career. He later lived in New York City and Los Angeles during his time as an actor.

== Career ==
Sheridan began his career in acting, appearing in small films and in recurring roles in television series like Veronica Mars, Walker, Texas Ranger, and most notably as David Hale in Sons of Anarchy. He made the transition into screenwriting after he turned 40. His first film as a screenwriter was Sicario, directed by Denis Villeneuve. It revolves around Kate Macer (Emily Blunt), an FBI agent who is enlisted to a government task force to bring down the leader of a powerful and brutal Mexican drug cartel. It also starred Josh Brolin and Benicio del Toro. The film received critical acclaim, with a 92% approval rating on Rotten Tomatoes, and received a number of nominations, including a Writers Guild of America Award nomination for Best Original Screenplay for Sheridan.

Sheridan wrote Comancheria after Sicario. Comancheria sold first but was stuck in development for quite a few years, appearing on the Black List survey of most liked screenplays not yet produced in 2012. It was later retitled Hell or High Water and was released in August 2016, starring Jeff Bridges, Chris Pine and Ben Foster, and again received critical acclaim. For his screenplay, Sheridan received a large amount of awards attention, earning BAFTA, Golden Globe Award, and Academy Award nominations.

The low-budget horror film Vile is credited as Sheridan's first film, but he does not consider the film his directorial debut, stating in a 2017 Rotten Tomatoes interview:

I would say this [Wind River] is my feature debut. A friend of mine raised – I don't know what he raised – 20 grand or something, and cast his buddies, and wrote this bad horror movie, that I told him not to direct. He was going to direct it and produce it, and he started and freaked out, and called and said, "Can you help me?" I said, "Yeah, I'll try." I kind of kept the ship pointed straight, and they went off and edited, and did what they did. I think it's generous to call me the director. I think he was try [sic] to say thank you, in some way. It was an excellent opportunity to point a camera and learn some lessons that actually benefited me on Wind River.

His second feature as director, and third as screenwriter, Wind River, starring Jeremy Renner and Elizabeth Olsen, premiered at the Sundance Film Festival in January 2017. The film follows an FBI agent (Olsen) and a veteran game tracker (Renner) investigating a murder that occurred on a Native American reservation. The Weinstein Company had acquired the distribution rights during the 2016 Cannes Film Festival, but dropped the film prior to the Sundance premiere. However, the company later finalized its deal to distribute it. Wind River was widely released in the United States on August 18, 2017, following a brief limited release. Following Sicario and Hell or High Water, Wind River is the third installment of Sheridan's trilogy of "the modern-day American frontier".

On September 15, 2016, Deadline reported that Sheridan had been set by Sony Pictures and Escape Artists to script the American remake of the Matthias Schoenaerts drama-thriller film Disorder, a 2015 French film directed by Alice Winocour. Escape Artists' Todd Black, Jason Blumenthal, Steve Tisch and Tony Shaw were scheduled to produce the remake and David Beaubaire to oversee it for the studio. James Mangold was going to direct.

In 2017, Sheridan created the television series Yellowstone, starring Kevin Costner, which aired on Paramount Network for five seasons, beginning June 20, 2018. Spinoffs include 1883 and 1923 on Paramount+.

Sheridan wrote the sequel to Sicario, titled Sicario: Day of the Soldado, which was directed by Stefano Sollima and released in 2018. More recently, his overall deal with ViacomCBS was renewed.

In May 2019, it was announced Warner Bros. Pictures and New Line Cinema acquired distribution rights to the film Those Who Wish Me Dead with Sheridan as director. The film had a theatrical debut internationally in South Korea on May 5, 2021. In the United States, it was released on May 14, 2021.

Owing partly to the success of the Yellowstone franchise, Sheridan expanded with the subsequent TV productions Tulsa King starring Sylvester Stallone, which has been renewed through season 4, and Landman starring Billy Bob Thornton.

On June 23, 2025, Paulynne, Inc., which owns and controls all of famed broadcaster Paul Harvey's intellectual property, sued Paramount Global in New York federal court. The company sued Paramount for using a 90 second audio clip from The Rest of the Story in Landman without permission. Paramount used a segment about rising gas prices from Harvey's 2009 "Gas Crisis" episode in the opening of the Season 1 finale. The lawsuit accused Paramount of failing to obtain permission to use the clip as well as editing the clip to change Harvey's viewpoint with regard to government fossil-fuel policies and his interest in alternative fuels.

On June 5, 2025, it was announced that NOLA King, a spin-off series of Tulsa King, was in the works at Paramount+. The series will be set in New Orleans and will star Samuel L. Jackson in a similar role as the one Stallone plays in Tulsa King. Jackson appeared in the third season of Tulsa King.

On February 24, 2026, it was reported by The Hollywood Reporter that Paramount+ had announced that the spinoff was moving away from New Orleans in favor of Texas and the name of the show changed to Frisco King instead of NOLA King. In addition, it was announced that Sheridan had been tapped to write all eight episodes of the first season.

On October 28, 2025, it was reported that Sheridan had signed a five-year overall deal with NBCUniversal, which will take effect after his current deals with Paramount expire in March 2026 for film, and 2028 for television. The deal was described as being a "coup" for the company, coming shortly after Skydance Media completed its acquisition of Paramount; CEO David Ellison had previously praised Sheridan as being a "singular genius", and had hoped that he would "call Paramount his home for as long as he wants to be telling stories."

On June 23, 2026, Sheridan co-wrote a book with former convict Tom Nelson entitled How to Not Die in Prison.

== Style ==
As an actor, Sheridan explained that the amount of expositional dialogue he read for television caused him to form an "allergy to exposition" in his writing. He has also said that he looks for "absurdly simple" plots to focus solely on character. He has cited the Coen brothers, Cormac McCarthy, and Larry McMurtry as influential to his writing.

Sheridan's popular TV shows such as Landman have widely been described as "conservative", "red-state entertainment" and "Make America Great Again propaganda". Sheridan has publicly contested these characterizations of his style noting in an interview with the The Atlantic "I just sit back laughing. I’m like, ‘Really?". Critics note a more complex blend of some progressive and traditional conservative themes in his shows.

== Personal life ==
Sheridan has been married to actress and model Nicole Muirbrook since 2013. The pair have a son. They currently reside in Weatherford, Texas. Their son, Augustus Sheridan, named after the lead character of Lonesome Dove, was born on September 23, 2010, as Taylor Sheridan writes in his Preface to the 2010 edition of Lonesome Dove.

In May 2021, a buyer group represented by Sheridan purchased the 350,000-acre 6666 Ranch in west Texas. In 2025, Sheridan bought Cattlemen's Steak House in Fort Worth, Texas, with two business partners.

== Filmography ==
Key
†	Denotes works that have not yet been released

=== Film ===
Year	Title	Director	Writer	Producer
2011	Vile	Yes	No	No
2015	Sicario	No	Yes	No
2016	Hell or High Water	No	Yes	No
2017	Wind River	Yes	Yes	No
2018	Sicario: Day of the Soldado	No	Yes	No
2021	Without Remorse	No	Yes	No
2021	Those Who Wish Me Dead	Yes	Yes	Yes
2023	Finestkind	No	No	Yes
2027	F.A.S.T. †	No	Yes	Yes

=== Television ===
Key
†	Denotes television productions that have not yet been released

Year	Title	Creator	Director	Writer	Executive producer
2018–2024	Yellowstone	Yes	Yes	Yes	Yes
2019–present	The Last Cowboy	Yes	No	No	Yes
2021–2022	1883	Yes	Yes	Yes	Yes
2021–present	Mayor of Kingstown	Yes	Yes	Yes	Yes
2022–2025	1923	Yes	No	Yes	Yes
2022–present	Tulsa King	Yes	No	Yes	Yes
2023	Lawmen: Bass Reeves	No	No	No	Yes
2023–present	Lioness	Yes	Yes	Yes	Yes
2024–present	Landman	Yes	Yes	Yes	Yes
2025	The Road	Yes	No	No	Yes
2026–present	Marshals	No	No	No	Yes
2026–present	The Madison	Yes	No	Yes	Yes
2026–present	Dutton Ranch	No	No	No	Yes
2026	Frisco King †	Yes	No	Yes	Yes

=== Acting roles ===
==== Film ====
Year	Title	Role	Notes
2003	White Rush	Tug / Douglas	
2016	Hell or High Water	Cowboy	Cameo
2018	12 Strong	Brian	

==== Television ====
Year	Title	Role	Notes
1995	Walker, Texas Ranger	Vernon	Episode: "War Zone"
1996	Her Costly Affair	Chris	Television film
1997	Dr. Quinn, Medicine Woman	Corporal Winters	Episode: "A Matter of Conscience"
1999	Party of Five	Counterguy	Episode: "Haunted"
2000	Time of Your Life	Connor	Episode: "The Time They Decided to Date"
2001	V.I.P.	Dave	Episode: "A.I. Highrise"
2002	Strong Medicine	Tucker	Episode: "Positive"
2003	The Guardian	Tim Dohanic	Episode: "Back in the Ring"
2003	10-8: Officers on Duty	Shooter	Episode: "Brothers in Arms"
2004	Star Trek: Enterprise	Jareb	Episode: "Chosen Realm"
2004	NYPD Blue	Tim Lewis	Episode: "Old Yeller"
2005	CSI: NY	Joel Banks	Episode: "Supply & Demand"
2005	CSI: Crime Scene Investigation	Evan Peters	Episode: "Secrets and Flies"
2005–2007	Veronica Mars	Danny Boyd	5 episodes
2008–2010	Sons of Anarchy	Deputy David Hale	21 episodes
2011	NCIS: Los Angeles	Navy Captain Jennings	Episode: "Enemy Within"
2018–2024	Yellowstone	Travis Wheatley	12 episodes
2022	1883	Charles Goodnight	2 episodes
2024	Lioness	Cody Spears	3 episodes

== Awards and nominations ==
Year	Title	Awards/Nominations
2015	Sicario	Nominated – Writers Guild of America Award for Best Original Screenplay
2016	Hell or High Water	Nominated – Academy Award for Best Original Screenplay; Nominated – BAFTA Award for Best Original Screenplay; Nominated – Critics' Choice Movie Award for Best Screenplay; Nominated – Golden Globe Award for Best Screenplay; Nominated – Independent Spirit Award for Best Screenplay; Nominated – Gotham Independent Film Award for Best Screenplay; Nominated – Saturn Award for Best Writing; Nominated – Writers Guild of America Award for Best Original Screenplay; Nominated – AACTA International Award for Best Screenplay
2017	Wind River	Nominated – Directors Guild of America Award for Outstanding First-Time Feature Film
2022	Yellowstone	Nominated – Screen Actors Guild Award for Outstanding Performance by an Ensemble in a Drama Series; Nominated – Producers Guild of America Award for Best Episodic Drama
2022	1883	Nominated – Writers Guild of America Award for Television: Episodic Drama
2023	Lioness	Nominated – 2023 Asia Contents Awards & Global OTT Awards for Best Writer
