= David C. Glasser =

American film executive and producer

David C. Glasser is a film executive and producer. He was founder of Cutting Edge Entertainment, president of the Weinstein Company and Harvey Weinstein's right-hand man before becoming CEO of 101 Studios after the Weinstein brothers’ downfall for rape and sexual misconduct.

== History ==
Glasser began his career in film production in the 1990s, initially through Cutting Edge Entertainment, which produced independent films like One Eyed King. He later co-founded Splendid Pictures in partnership with a German media company and SP along with Paramount Pictures released Narc. In 2008, he joined TWC, eventually rising to COO as Harvey Weinstein's right-hand man and playing a major role in the company's international sales and distribution. He briefly left in 2015 but soon returned, staying until the company's collapse in 2018. He later started 101 Studios with David Hutkin.

== Legal and controversies ==
Glasser's career has been overshadowed by multiple lawsuits and controversies. In the 1990s, Glasser's company was reportedly used to launder money from a stock manipulation scheme tied to Roy Ageloff and the Genovese crime family, Ageloff was later convicted of racketeering. Over two decades, state and federal tax authorities filed liens against him, amounting to millions of dollars.

Amid TWC's implosion due to Harvey Weinstein's sexual misconduct scandal, Glasser was criticized for his proximity to Weinstein and perceived failure to address a toxic workplace culture while serving in his position in charge of the human resources department. His attempt to become the CEO of a restructured TWC was blocked by the attorney general of New York , leading to Glasser's dismissal in 2018. Glasser faced numerous lawsuits throughout his career including a notable case involving actor Alec Baldwin over unpaid fees and a $5 million judgment in a loan dispute.
