= List of Yellowstone characters =

Yellowstone is an American neo-Western drama television series created by Taylor Sheridan and John Linson. It premiered June 20, 2018 on Paramount Network and ended on December 15, 2024. The series follows many conflicts over borders and control of the Yellowstone Ranch, a huge cattle ranch; it is surrounded by the Broken Rock Indian reservation, Yellowstone National Park, and rival land developers.

== Cast overview ==
Key
Main cast (receives star billing)
Recurring cast (guest appearances in two or more episodes)
Guest cast (appearing in one episode or credited as co-starring)

=== Main cast ===
Actor	Character	Seasons				
Actor	Character	1	2	3	4	5
Kevin Costner	John Dutton III	Main (Note: In seasons one, two, and five, John Dutton III is played by actor Josh Lucas in flashbacks.)	Main	Main	Main	Main
Luke Grimes	Kayce Dutton	Main (Note: In seasons one and two, Kayce Dutton is played by guest actor Rhys Alterman in flashbacks.)	Main	Main	Main	Main
Kelly Reilly	Bethany "Beth" Dutton	Main (Note: In seasons one through three and season five, Beth Dutton is played by actress Kylie Rogers in flashbacks.)	Main	Main	Main	Main
Wes Bentley	James Michael "Jamie" Dutton	Main (Note: In seasons one through three, Jamie Dutton is played by guest actor Dalton Baker in flashbacks.)	Main	Main	Main	Main
Cole Hauser	Rip Wheeler	Main (Note: In seasons one through three and season five, Rip Wheeler is played by actor Kyle Red Silverstein in flashbacks.)	Main	Main	Main	Main
Kelsey Asbille	Monica Long Dutton	Main	Main	Main	Main	Main
Brecken Merrill	Tate Dutton	Main	Main	Main	Main	Main
Jefferson White	Jimmy Hurdstrom	Main	Main	Main	Main	Main
Danny Huston	Dan Jenkins	Main	Main			
Gil Birmingham	Chief Thomas Rainwater	Main	Main	Main	Main	Main
Forrie J. Smith	Lloyd Pierce	Recurring	Recurring	Main	Main	Main
Denim Richards	Colby Mayfield	Recurring	Recurring	Main	Main	Main
Ian Bohen	Ryan	Recurring	Recurring	Recurring	Main	Main
Ryan Bingham	Walker	Recurring	Recurring	Recurring	Main	Main
Finn Little	Carter				Main	Main
Wendy Moniz	Governor Lynelle Perry	Recurring	Guest	Recurring	Guest	Main
Jennifer Landon	Teeter			Recurring	Recurring	Main
Kathryn Kelly	Emily				Recurring	Main
Mo Brings Plenty	Mo	Recurring	Recurring	Recurring	Recurring	Main

=== Recurring cast ===
Actor	Character	Seasons				
Actor	Character	1	2	3	4	5
Michael Nouri	Bob Schwartz	Recurring	Recurring	Recurring	Recurring	
Atticus Todd	Ben Waters	Recurring	Recurring	Recurring		
Rudy Ramos	Felix Long	Recurring	Guest		Guest	Guest
Tokala Black Elk	Sam Stands Alone	Recurring				
Luke Peckinpah	Fred Meyers	Recurring				
Walter C. Taylor III	Emmett Walsh	Recurring		Guest	Guest	Recurring
David Cleveland Brown	Jason	Recurring	Recurring			
Timothy Carhart	Mike Stewart	Recurring	Guest	Recurring		
Fredric Lehne	Carl Reynolds	Recurring				
Robert Mirabal	Principal Littlefield	Recurring				
Heather Hemmens	Melody Prescott	Recurring				
Katherine Cunningham	Christina	Recurring	Recurring		Recurring	Guest
Michaela Conlin	Sarah Nguyen	Recurring	Guest			
Hugh Dillon	Sheriff Donnie Haskell	Recurring	Guest	Recurring	Guest	
Jake Ream	Jake	Guest	Recurring	Recurring	Recurring	Recurring
Tanaya Beatty	Avery	Guest	Recurring		Recurring	
Steven Williams	Cowboy		Recurring			
Neal McDonough	Malcolm Beck		Recurring			
Terry Serpico	Teal Beck		Recurring			
Kelly Rohrbach	Cassidy Reid		Recurring			
Martin Sensmeier	Martin		Recurring			
James Jordan	Steve Hendon		Recurring	Recurring	Recurring	Guest
Lane Garrison	Ray		Recurring			
Gabriel "Gator" Guilbeau	Gator		Recurring	Guest	Recurring	Recurring
Wolé Parks	Torry		Recurring			
Ethan Lee	Ethan			Recurring	Recurring	Recurring
Josh Holloway	Roarke Morris			Recurring	Guest	
John Emmet Tracy	Ellis Steele			Recurring	Recurring	Recurring
Q'orianka Kilcher	Angela Blue Thunder			Recurring		Recurring
Boots Southerland	Wade Morrow			Recurring		
Brent Walker	Clint Morrow			Recurring		
Karen Pittman	Willa Hayes			Recurring		
Eden Brolin	Mia			Recurring	Recurring	
Hassie Harrison	Laramie			Recurring	Recurring	Recurring
Taylor Sheridan	Travis Wheatley	Guest	Guest		Recurring	Recurring
Maria Julian	Kate			Guest	Recurring	Recurring
Will Patton	Garrett Randall			Guest	Recurring	
Jacki Weaver	Caroline Warner				Recurring	Recurring
Jerynce Brings Plenty	Jerynce				Recurring	Guest
Piper Perabo	Summer Higgins				Recurring	Recurring
Kai Caster	Rowdy					Recurring
Lainey Wilson	Abby					Recurring
Dawn Olivieri	Sarah Atwood					Recurring
Lilli Kay	Clara Brewer					Recurring
Matt Gerald	Grant Horton					Recurring
Rory Cochrane	Kevin Dillard					Recurring

== Main characters ==
- Kevin Costner as John Dutton III, a widowed fifth-generation patriarch of the Dutton family who owned and operated the Yellowstone Dutton Ranch, the largest contiguous ranch in the United States, and also served as Montana Livestock Commissioner. As the series progressed, he was continually challenged by those seeking to take control of the ranch's land. At the beginning of the fifth season, he becomes the Governor of Montana and later gives ownership of the ranch to his youngest son, Kayce. At the beginning of Part 2 of the fifth season, he is killed by hitmen hired by Sarah Atwood.
  - Josh Lucas portrays a young John Dutton in the 1990s. (recurring seasons 1, 5; guest season 2).
- Luke Grimes as Kayce John Dutton, a former US Navy SEAL, Livestock Agent (later Commissioner), and John and Evelyn's youngest son. He initially lived on the Broken Rock Indian Reservation with his Native American wife and son, before moving back to the Yellowstone Ranch with them. In the fifth season, Kayce inherited the ranch but couldn’t afford to pay the inheritance tax to keep the land. To preserve the Dutton’s legacy, Kayce sold it to the Broken Rock Indian Reservation. He and his family still own a little piece of the land called East Camp. He later became a U.S. Marshal.
  - Rhys Alterman portrays a young Kayce Dutton in the 1990s. (guest seasons 1–2)
- Kelly Reilly as Bethany "Beth" Dutton, a financier and John and Evelyn's only daughter. Although well-educated, highly intelligent, and a master manipulator, Beth is bitter, abrasive, amoral, sadistic, volatile, selfish, and emotionally unstable. She was loyal and extremely protective of her father, and after an on-again, off-again relationship with Rip Wheeler, they eventually get married. She and Rip take Carter in as their son and begin a new life on another ranch.
  - Kylie Rogers portrays a young Beth Dutton in the 1990s. (recurring season 5; guest seasons 1–3)
- Wes Bentley as James Michael "Jamie" Dutton, an aspiring politician and John and Evelyn's adopted son. As an infant, he was adopted after his biological father murdered his mother and went to prison. Once completely loyal to his father and family, their irrational intolerance and mistreatment of him eventually drives him to follow his own path. He has a mutually hateful relationship with his sister, Beth, due to young Jamie taking young Beth to have her womb cut out of her while Beth believed she was only getting an abortion. In the third season, he becomes the Attorney General of Montana. With his former assistant, he has a son named after him. Jamie later teams with Sarah Atwood and begins to plan to take the ranch by forcing the Duttons to sell.
  - Dalton Baker portrays a young Jamie Dutton in the 1990s. (guest seasons 1–3)
- Cole Hauser as Rip Wheeler, the ranch foreman at the Yellowstone Dutton Ranch and John's right-hand man and enforcer. Rip has worked on the ranch for many years and is fiercely loyal to John. He was taken in by the Duttons as a young runaway after killing his father, who murdered his mother and brother. Rip has had an on-again, off-again relationship with Beth since they were teenagers, until they eventually get married.
  - Kyle Red Silverstein portrays a young Rip Wheeler in the 1990s. (recurring season 5; guest seasons 1–3).
- Kelsey Asbille as Monica Long Dutton, Kayce's Native American wife and John's daughter-in-law. She is initially a teacher at a local school on the Broken Rock Indian Reservation and later becomes a professor at Montana State University in Bozeman.
- Brecken Merrill as Tate Dutton, Kayce and Monica's son and John's only biological grandchild, and heir to the Yellowstone Dutton Ranch.
- Jefferson White as Jimmy Hurdstrom, a ranch hand at Yellowstone and an amateur bronc rider. In the fourth season, he leaves Yellowstone to join the 6666 Ranch.
- Danny Huston as Dan Jenkins (seasons 1–2), a billionaire land developer from California whose main goal is to take the Yellowstone Ranch from John and his family along with Chief Rainwater but the three join forces against the Beck brothers in the second season.
- Gil Birmingham as Chief Thomas Rainwater, the chief of the Broken Rock Indian Reservation who neighbors the Yellowstone Ranch. He seeks to reclaim the land that the Yellowstone Ranch is built on from the Duttons that he believes was stolen from the Native Americans who originally inhabited it.
- Forrie J. Smith as Lloyd Pierce (seasons 3–5; recurring seasons 1–2), the longest serving ranch hand who has worked with John on the Yellowstone Ranch for decades.
  - Smith's son, Forrest Smith (also known as Forrest Wilder), portrays a younger Lloyd Pierce in season 2 and 5 flashback scenes.
- Denim Richards as Colby Mayfield (seasons 3–5; recurring seasons 1–2), a ranch hand at Yellowstone and Teeter's boyfriend.
- Ian Bohen as Ryan (seasons 4–5; recurring seasons 1–3), a ranch hand at Yellowstone and a Montana Livestock Agent.
- Ryan Bingham as Walker (seasons 4–5; recurring seasons 1–3), a musician and former convict recruited as a ranch hand at Yellowstone by Rip Wheeler.
- Finn Little as Carter Green (seasons 4–5), a troubled teenager and orphan who is taken in by Beth Dutton and becomes a ranch hand at Yellowstone.
- Wendy Moniz as Senator Lynelle Perry (season 5; recurring seasons 1, 3; guest seasons 2, 4), the former Governor of Montana and John's love interest. At the beginning of the fifth season, she becomes the U.S. Senator for Montana.
- Jennifer Landon as Teeter (season 5; recurring seasons 3–4), a tough-talking ranch hand from Texas and Colby's girlfriend.
- Kathryn Kelly as Emily (season 5; recurring season 4), the chief vet technician for the 6666 Ranch and Jimmy's fiancée.
- Mo Brings Plenty as Mo (season 5; recurring seasons 1–4), Chief Rainwater's personal driver and bodyguard.

== Recurring characters ==
- Michael Nouri as Bob Schwartz (seasons 1–4), the CEO at the financial firm Schwartz & Meyer, where Beth Dutton is a partner.
- Atticus Todd as Ben Waters (seasons 1–3), a tribal police officer.
- Rudy Ramos as Felix Long (season 1; guest seasons 2, 4–5), Monica's grandfather, and Tate's great-grandfather.
- Tokala Black Elk as Sam Stands Alone (season 1), a friend of the Long family.
- Luke Peckinpah as Fred Meyers (season 1), a ranch hand at Yellowstone.
- Walter C. Taylor III as Emmett Walsh (seasons 1, 5; guest seasons 3–4), an experienced elderly rancher and the chairman of the Stock Growers Association.
- David Cleveland Brown as Jason (seasons 1–2), Beth Dutton's assistant.
- Timothy Carhart as Mike Stewart (seasons 1, 3; guest season 2), the former attorney general for Montana.
- Fredric Lehne as Carl Reynolds (season 1), a close friend of John Dutton.
- Robert Mirabal as Principal Littlefield (season 1), a tribal school principal at Heartsong Middle School.
- Heather Hemmens as Melody Prescott (season 1), Dan Jenkins's real estate assistant.
- Katherine Cunningham as Christina (seasons 1–2, 4; guest season 5), Jamie Dutton's assistant during his political campaign for attorney general who later gives birth to his son.
- Michaela Conlin as Sarah Nguyen (season 1; guest season 2), an investigative reporter drawn to John Dutton and his family.
- Hugh Dillon as Sheriff Donnie Haskell (seasons 2, 4; guest seasons 1, 3) the Sheriff of Park County, Montana.
- Jake Ream as Jake (seasons 2–5; guest season 1), a bespectacled ranch hand at Yellowstone.
- Tanaya Beatty as Avery (seasons 2, 4; guest season 1), a former stripper recruited by Rip as a ranch hand at Yellowstone.
- Steven Williams as "Cowboy" (season 2), a veteran cowboy whose real name is unknown.
- Neal McDonough as Malcolm Beck (season 2), a rival businessman and nemesis to John Dutton.
- Terry Serpico as Teal Beck (season 2), Malcolm's brother and business partner.
- Kelly Rohrbach as Cassidy Reid (season 2), a prosecutor, and former rodeo queen.
- Martin Sensmeier as Martin (season 2), Monica's physical therapist. Sensmeier also portrays Sam in 1883.
- James Jordan as Steve Hendon (seasons 2–4; guest season 5), a livestock agent who works with Kayce. Jordan also portrays Cookie in 1883.
- Lane Garrison as Ray (season 2), a meth dealer and old friend of Jimmy.
- Ryan Dorsey as Blake (season 2), a meth dealer who works with Ray.
- Gabriel "Gator" Guilbeau as Gator (seasons 2, 4–5; guest season 3), the personal chef for the Dutton family. Guilbeau, a real-life chef specializing in Cajun cuisine, is also the craft services manager and head chef for the production of Yellowstone.
- Wolé Parks as Torry (season 2), the head of security for Dan Jenkins.
- Ethan Lee as Ethan (seasons 3–5), a newly hired ranch hand at Yellowstone.
- Josh Holloway as Roarke Morris (season 3; guest season 4), a rancher and stockholder for Market Equities, who seek to claim Yellowstone for real estate.
- John Emmet Tracy as Ellis Steele (seasons 3–5), a real estate representative for Market Equities.
- Q'orianka Kilcher as Angela Blue Thunder (seasons 3, 5), a tribal lawyer working with Chief Rainwater.
- Boots Southerland as Wade Morrow (season 3), a neighbouring rancher to Yellowstone.
- Brent Walker as Clint Morrow (season 3), Wade's son and a ranch hand.
- Karen Pittman as Willa Hayes (season 3), the former CEO of Market Equities.
- Eden Brolin as Mia (seasons 3–4), a barrel racer and Jimmy's ex-girlfriend.
- Hassie Harrison as Laramie (seasons 3–5), a barrel racer, Mia's friend, and Walker's girlfriend.
- Taylor Sheridan as Travis Wheatly (seasons 4–5; guest seasons 1–2), a horse trader and an acquaintance of John Dutton. Sheridan is the co-creator of Yellowstone and also portrays Charles Goodnight in 1883.
- Maria Julian as Kate (seasons 4–5; guest season 3), Jamie Dutton's assistant after becoming the Attorney General of Montana.
- Will Patton as Garrett Randall (season 4; guest season 3), Jamie's biological father.
- Jacki Weaver as Caroline Warner (seasons 4–5), the chairperson for the board of directors for Market Equities who hopes to build an airport and ski resort on Yellowstone.
- Jerynce Brings Plenty as Jerynce (season 4; guest season 5), Mo's teenage son.
- Piper Perabo as Summer Higgins (seasons 4–5), an animal rights activist who befriends John despite their contrasting viewpoints. She later serves as his environmental advisor and becomes his love interest.
- Kai Caster as Rowdy (season 5), the ranch foreman at Yellowstone in the 1990s.
- Lainey Wilson as Abby (season 5), a country music singer who befriends Ryan.
- Dawn Olivieri as Sarah Atwood (season 5), a business heavy hitter for Market Equities brought in to bring ruin to the Duttons. Olivieri also portrays Claire Dutton in 1883.
- Lilli Kay as Clara Brewer (season 5), John Dutton's assistant after becoming the Governor of Montana.
- Matt Gerald as Grant Horton (season 5), a hitman hired by Sarah Atwood to assassinate John Dutton.
- Rory Cochrane as Kevin Dillard (season 5), the lead detective investigating John Dutton's death.

== Guest characters ==
- Dave Annable as Lee Dutton, John Dutton's oldest son, head of security at Yellowstone, and a sworn agent of the Montana Livestock Commission. ("Daybreak", "Resurrection Day" and "Grass on the Streets and Weeds on the Rooftops")
  - Kip Denton portrays a young Lee Dutton ("Blood the Boy")
- Jeremiah Bitsui as Robert Long, a US Army veteran, Monica's brother and Tate's uncle. ("Daybreak")
- Morningstar Angeline as Samantha Long, Robert's wife, and Monica's sister-in-law. ("Daybreak" and "No Good Horses")
- Stanley Peternel as Dirk Hurdstrom, Jimmy's grandfather and only living relative. ("Daybreak", "Only Devils Left" and "Enemies by Monday")
- Gretchen Mol as Evelyn Dutton, the late wife of John Dutton and mother to Lee, Jamie, Beth, and Kayce, who died in a horseriding accident in 1997. ("No Good Horses" and "A Monster is Among Us")
- Geno Segers as Danny Trudeau, a man searching for his missing daughter, Daisy. ("No Good Horses")
- Rob Kirkland as Watch Commander / Sheriff Ramsey, a Watch Commander of Park County, Montana who is later promoted to Sheriff. ("Enemies by Monday", "No Such Thing as Fair" and "Tall Drink of Water")
- Dabney Coleman as John Dutton II, John's father. ("Sins of the Father")
- Barry Corbin as Ross, an elderly cowboy at the 6666 Ranch. ("Under a Blanket of Red")
- Tim McGraw as James Dillard Dutton, the great-grandfather of John Dutton III. McGraw reprises his role in 1883. ("Half the Money" and "No Kindness for the Coward")
- Faith Hill as Margaret Dutton, the great-grandmother of John Dutton III. Hill reprises her role in 1883. ("No Kindness for the Coward")
- Billy Klapper as himself, appearing in his workshop in Pampa, Texas, where Rip Wheeler picks up a bit ordered by Lloyd. The episode ends with a tribute reading "In Loving Memory of Billy Klapper", following his death in 2024. ("Desire Is All You Need")
- Vinessa Shaw as Dr. Janice Everly, the state medical examiner for Montana. ("Three Fifty-Three")
- Gareth Williams as Steven Rawlings, the Lt. Governor of Montana who after John Dutton's death becomes the Governor of Montana. ("Three Fifty-Three")
