= Marshals (TV series) =

American television series

- Promotional title card
- Also known as: Y: Marshals
- Genre: Drama; Neo-Western; Police procedural
- Created by: Spencer Hudnut
- Based on: Characters by: Taylor Sheridan; John Linson
- Showrunner: Spencer Hudnut
- Starring: Luke Grimes; Logan Marshall-Green; Arielle Kebbel; Ash Santos; Tatanka Means; Brecken Merrill; Mo Brings Plenty; Gil Birmingham
- Music by: Brian Tyler; Breton Vivian
- Country of origin: United States
- Original language: English
- No. of seasons: 2
- No. of episodes: 19

Production
- Executive producers: Greg Yaitanes; Luke Grimes; Michael Friedman; Ron Burkle; David Hutkin; Bob Yari; Spencer Hudnut; John Linson; Art Linson; David C. Glasser; Taylor Sheridan
- Producer: Sandra Nebel
- Cinematography: Christopher Faloona
- Editor: Amy Fleming
- Running time: 42–43 minutes
- Production companies: Paramount Television Studios; 101 Studios; Bosque Ranch Productions; Linson Entertainment
- Budget: $52 million

Original release
- Network: CBS
- Release: March 1, 2026 – present

Related
- Yellowstone franchise

Marshals is an American neo-Western and police procedural television series created by Spencer Hudnut. The series serves as both a spin-off and sequel to Yellowstone (2018–2024) and is the fourth television series in the Yellowstone franchise. It stars Luke Grimes, Brecken Merrill, Mo Brings Plenty, and Gil Birmingham reprising their roles from Yellowstone, with Logan Marshall-Green, Arielle Kebbel, Ash Santos, and Tatanka Means also starring.

Marshals premiered on CBS on March 1, 2026. In March 2026, the series was renewed for a second season which premiered on October 4, 2026. The show was nominated for Best Broadcast Network Drama Ensemble at the 6th Astra TV Awards.

== Premise ==
Marshals follows former U.S. Navy SEAL and current rancher Kayce Dutton, who is grieving the death of his wife, Monica, and adjusting to raising their son, Tate, alone. He soon joins an elite and specalized U.S. Marshals unit, under the wing and leadership of Pete "Cal" Calvin, tasked with protecting Montana.

== Cast and characters ==
=== Main ===
- Luke Grimes as Deputy U.S. Marshal Kayce Dutton, the youngest son of John Dutton, and a rancher and former US Navy SEAL
- Logan Marshall-Green as Supervisory Deputy U.S. Marshal Pete "Cal" Calvin, the chief of the Marshals team. Calvin is a former US Navy SEAL Senior Chief and Kayce's former team leader, who joined the U.S. Marshals Service to break away from bad habits and adapt to life after the SEAL Teams.
- Arielle Kebbel as Deputy U.S. Marshal Isabel "Belle" Turek-Skinner, a member of the team and former ATF agent, specialized in ballistics and weapons and a compulsive gambler who is deeply in debt.
- Ash Santos as Deputy U.S. Marshal Andrea Cruz, who was a Deputy who was initially assigned to a team in Washington D.C. before being reluctantly transferred to Montana.
- Tatanka Means as Deputy U.S. Marshal Miles Kittle, a former Broken Rock Reservation Tribal Police Officer and former Marine, who has a sometimes strained relationship with Broken Rock due to his federal government ties.
- Brecken Merrill as Tate Dutton, Kayce's son
- Mo Brings Plenty as Mo, Broken Rock Tribal Police Lieutenant, Broken Rock Chairman Thomas Rainwater's driver and personal bodyguard.
- Gil Birmingham as Thomas Rainwater, the elected Chairman of the Confederated Tribes of Broken Rock, Administrator of the Painted Horse Casino and the Grey Wolf Peak Casino.

=== Recurring ===
- Brett Cullen as U.S. Marshal Harry Gifford, a long time Montana lawman and sheriff who is Cal's superior who is suspicious of Kayce because of past Dutton family dealings.
- Morgan Lindholm as Maddie, Cal's estranged daughter who is a bartender at the local bar and Miles' girlfriend.
- Chris Mulkey as Tom Weaver (season 1; guest season 2), a wealthy Wall Street man turned local rancher interested in purchasing East Camp
- Ellyn Jameson as Dolly Weaver, Tom's daughter
- Riley Green as Garrett, Cal and Kayce's former Navy SEAL teammate
- Jefferson White as Jimmy Hurdstrom (season 2), a former ranch hand at the Yellowstone ranch, who later moved to Texas to work for the Four Sixes.
- Braxton Hale as Rudy Carpenter, a wanted fugitive, serial bomber and domestic terrorist

=== Guest ===
- Chad Michael Collins as Owen Kilborn (season 1), the Director of the Montana Fish, Game, and Parks Department
- Loren Anthony as Jim Kane (season 1), a suspect
- Michael Cudlitz as Randall Clegg (season 1), a bitter, longtime rival of the Dutton family who leads an anti-government survivalist militia against Kayce Dutton and the U.S. Marshals
- Eddie Aguirre as Jared Skinner, Belle Skinner's husband and Braxton's father
- Koah Williams as Braxton Skinner, Belle and Jared's son
- Michael Reagan as Don Moore, a local rancher who escalates a blockade on Highway 191
- Rudy Ramos as Felix Long, Monica's grandfather and Tate's great-grandfather
- Brenda Strong as Samantha Clarkson, Belle's mother
- Isabel Deroy-Olson as Hayley Charlo (season 1), a trafficked girl and Tate's friend
- Gary Nohealii as Nathan Irons (season 1), a councilmember for the Confederated Tribes of Broken Rock
- Chelsea Gray as Sabrina (season 1), Miles' childhood friend
- Jay Reeves as Roner (season 1), a former Navy SEAL teammate
- Christine Dunford as Judge Pauline Ayers (season 1)
- Rob Mars as Wayne Plummer (season 1), a disgraced former Montana law enforcement officer who launches a violent revenge campaign against his former superiors
- Beau Knapp as Eric Savard, the manipulative leader of a farming cult

== Episodes ==
Season	Episodes	Originally released		Rank	Average viewership (in millions)
Season	Episodes	First released	Last released	Rank	Average viewership (in millions)
1	13	March 1, 2026	May 24, 2026	1	19.30
2	20	October 4, 2026	TBA	TBA	TBA

=== Season 1 (2026) ===
No. overall	No. in season	Title	Directed by	Written by	Original release date
1	1	"Piya Wiconi"	Greg Yaitanes	Spencer Hudnut	March 1, 2026
Kayce Dutton joins the U.S. Marshals tactical team in Montana and gets pulled into a high-stakes conspiracy. The team investigate a bombing at a political rally with a protest rally targeting a rare-earth mineral mine near the Broken Rock Reservation. A local man Jim Kane, is framed after extremists kidnapped his family. Kayce and his U.S. Marshals teammates discover that the attack was not orchestrated by anti-government militants alone, but by Fish, Game and Parks Director Owen Kilborn, a corrupt mercenary working for outside financial interests to eliminate Broken Rock Chairman Rainwater, after the Marshals discover Kilborn received a $250,000 offshore wire transfer,. During the rescue mission, Kayce and the U.S. Marshals track Kane's kidnapped daughter to a remote lake, killing Owen and rescuing Kane's wife and daughter, thereby clearing Kane's name and preventing further bloodshed. Following the ordeal, Kayce grapples with his turbulent past, his lingering grief over Monica's death, and his protective role as a father. After a heart-to-heart talk with his son Tate, granting him the freedom to forge his own path rather than inherit the heavy burden of the Yellowstone Ranch. Kayce then visits his late wife Monica's burial site at East Camp to finds some closure.
2	2	"Zone of Death"	Greg Yaitanes	Spencer Hudnut	March 8, 2026
Kayce adapts to his new role with the U.S. Marshals, led by his former SEAL teammate Pete Calvin, during training and a subsequent operation to capture a fugitive. Demonstrating his tactical skills, Kayce and the team uncover a dangerous deal involving illegal weapons and fentanyl between the white supremacist Aryan Brethren gang and the 406 Royals Mexican cartel in a remote area known as the "Zone of Death" near Wyoming. The operation escalates when they realize a bomb is being transported instead of firearms. In the ensuing shootout, the Aryan Brethren flee, and Kayce takes decisive action, pursuing the criminals on horseback and using gunfire to detonate the bomb. He kills a surviving gang member, disposing the body over a cliff linked to the infamous Yellowstone "train station". Tensions arise within the team as Andrea and Calvin debate leadership roles and Kayce's influence grows. Harry Gifford grows suspicious of Kayce's intentions, especially considering his family's troubled past involving the mysterious disappearance of his brother Jamie and the murder of his father, John. After sharing a moment with Calvin over drinks, Kayce returns to East Camp, where his son Tate mentions a remembrance ceremony for Monica.
3	3	"Road to Nowhere"	Christopher Chulack	Tom Mularz	March 15, 2026
In a tense meeting, Kayce discusses the threats facing Thomas Rainwater and his new team. The situation escalates as the U.S. Marshals encounter a fiery standoff on the Broken Rock Reservation, where residents protest a rerouted convoy destined for a controversial rare-earth mineral mine, necessitated by a sabotage of a main road. During attempts to clear the road, hidden snipers critically wound two young women, endangering the Marshals. Working alongside Rainwater, Kayce helps investigate the attack, uncovering that corrupt local contractors, the Clegg brothers, orchestrated the violence to punish Broken Rock and protect their own mine-blasting contracts. Kayce and the team track the suspects into the dense forest, engaging in a high-stakes shootout, killing the brothers. Back on the Broken Rock Reservation, the U.S. Marshals grapple with their uneasy reception from hostile locals who view them as outsiders and Miles as a traitor. However, after saving lives and eliminating the perpetrators, the team slowly begins to earn the Reservation people's begrudging respect. Kayce shares a quiet moment of reflection with Rainwater, reaffirming their bond. At night, Kayce discovers a single bullet on his front doorstep.
4	4	"The Gathering Storm"	Christopher Chulack	Dana Greenblatt	March 22, 2026
Kayce faces potential legal issues as Carson Clegg's father files a Civil Rights complaint, accusing him of using excessive force that led to the death of an unarmed man. U.S. Marshal Harry Gifford's longstanding animosity toward the Dutton family forces Deputy Andrea Cruz to conduct a thorough internal investigation into Kayce's actions during a shootout, causing tension within the tactical unit. Amid this turmoil, Kayce and Calvin participate in a search-and-rescue operation in the Bridger Rangers following a wealthy rancher's helicopter crash. Despite dangerous conditions, including a grizzly bear encounter, they discover the wreckage after spotting oil in a creek. Upon reaching the helicopter, Kayce finds the pilot, Helen, fatally impaled by a tree branch but is able to rescue and deliver the survivor, Tom Weaver, to safety. Concurrently, Belle and Andrea discover a trail camera that recorded the shootout, which reveals that Carson Clegg was armed, exonerating Kayce and halting Gifford's investigation. Kayce celebrates his clearance with teammates at a local bar, where Calvin expresses a desire to reconnect with his daughter, bartender Maddie. Meanwhile, Kayce shares a moment with Weaver's daughter, Dolly, who expresses her gratitude by buying drinks.
5	5	"Lost Girls"	Guy Ferland	Jim Adler	March 29, 2026
Kayce rushes outside to stop his son, Tate, from being trampled by his late wife Monica's volatile, troubled stallion. When Cal tries to initiate a conversation at the Bullet 'n Barrel Saloon with Maddie, she doesn't welcome him with open arms. Instead, she fiercely confronts him about his complete absence during her childhood. As Kayce and Tate are taking the stallion for sale in Wyoming and stop a truck stop, Tate notices Hayley; an old friend from the Broken Rock reservation. Her distant, distracted and erratic behaviour makes Kayce think that she is a trafficking victim. She is later discovered to have been reported missing to the Broken Rock Tribal Police and suspected of being targeted by an online predator. With Tribal Police limitations and the discovery of the disappearance of another girl named Ava, Deputy Marshals Kayce, Miles, and their unit mobilise to track down the human trafficking ring. Kayce returns to the truck stop in Wyoming and finds Hayley, who reveals that the gang killed Ava, and she leaves, stating that if she doesn't return, others will be punished. Miles berates Kayce for letting Hayley go, not understanding the full situation and reasoning. Later, the team traces the perpetrators to a campervan operated by a criminal named Kurt Bludsoe and his associates. With Miles losing his temper and not following Calvin's orders, he speeds up toward the suspect camper, alerting the occupants that they're being followed and leading to a high-stakes, gunfire-heavy pursuit. The U.S. Marshals manage to stop and secure the camper on a rural highway. The trafficked girls are not inside, leaving the team to regroup and continue the desperate search to rescue the remaining captive girls.
6	6	"Out of the Shadows"	Guy Ferland	Mark H. Semos	April 5, 2026
Tate gets angry at Kayce for allowing Hayley to return to the traffickers. After the news of Ava's tragic death, Deputy Marshals Calvin and Miles deliver the news of her death to her grieving mother, Sera. Driven to bring justice to the victims and find the remaining missing girls, the U.S. Marshals discover a link between the dangerous human traffickers and the Iron Sentinels, a violent outlaw motorcycle gang. To locate the captives, Deputy Marshal Belle reactivates her undercover biker persona, infiltrating a high-stakes rally in Milk River Valley with 15 kilos of seized meth to contact "Brimstone", a nomad enforcer moving victims across state lines. When Belle's cover is blown, Kayce, Calvin, Miles, and Andrea stage a tactical intervention. A fierce shootout ensues, resulting in Miles killing Brimstone and the team cornering a transport truck. Inside, they discover Hayley and nine other missing girls hidden in storage barrels, successfully rescuing them and reuniting them with their families. Following the rescue, Kayce returns to the Broken Rock reservation to join Tate, Chairman Thomas Rainwater, and the community at a memorial ceremony for Monica. Kayce gives Tate his mother's necklace as the family stands together, finally finding closure.
7	7	"Family Business"	Gonzalo Amat	Dana Greenblatt	April 12, 2026
Tom offers to buy East Camp from Kayce, who is unsure and gently declines Tom's daughter, Dolly's, romantic advances. Meanwhile, the Marshals protect Federal judge Pauline Ayers after a fatal car bombing attempt. While initial suspicions falls on an ex-con, a sniper attack at the judge's home clears him. The investigation shifts focus when secret accounts, fake IDs, and weapons-smuggling links are discovered, connecting Pauline's husband, Blake. Unbeknownst to Pauline, Blake is an illegal international arms dealer, involved with shipping illicit weapons to a resistance group in Equatorial Guinea, using his dental practice and non-profit organisation as a front for laundering funds to overthrow the corrupt President Bindong. Blake voluntarily surrenders to two ex-Delta Force contractors who torture him for rebel information; Kayce and Andrea embark on a rescue mission, killing the contractors and saving Blake and reuniting him with his family. Elsewhere, Miles musters the courage to ask out his crush at the local bar, only to discover it is Maddie. After confronting Belle about her husband's infidelity, Calvin shares a sudden, complicated kiss with her. Finally, after a heart-to-heart with Andrea about moving past grief, Kayce opens up to new prospects and agrees to ride with Dolly again.
8	8	"Blowback"	John Erick Dowdle	Jim Adler & Lyle Mitchell Corbine Jr.	April 19, 2026
Kayce, Tate, and Calvin enjoy a peaceful morning at East Camp, interrupted by the arrival of Garrett, an old Navy SEAL teammate carrying severe psychological trauma. Tensions flare between Calvin and Garrett due to a past military incident that ended Calvin's career and left Garrett struggling. Calvin finds out about Miles and Maddie's relationship. Meanwhile, Deputy Marshals Calvin, Kayce, and Andrea investigate a tip regarding wanted bank robber Reed Pollard. The operation turns out to be a staged trap, leading to a barn shootout with four unidentified mercenaries, who are killed. While transporting the mercenaries' weapons to forensics, Andrea's car is T-boned and abducted in a calculated side collision organized by Randall Clegg. Seeking revenge after his family business collapsed following past clashes with the authorities, Clegg ties Andrea up in a basement. When the marshals discover Andrea's smashed vehicle and kidnapping, the unit launches a desperate all-hands-on-rescue operation. The marshals trace Clegg to his heavily fortified compound and launch a desperate rescue attempt without waiting for backup. Upon arrival, Clegg's heavily armed militia ambush Kayce, Calvin, Belle, and Miles, leaving the team hopelessly pinned down under intense fire with Andrea's life on the line.
9	9	"In Low Places"	Gonzalo Amat	Tom Mularz & Maggie Schroeder	April 26, 2026
Faced with heavy enemy fire and an entrenched militia at Randall Clegg's compound, the marshals are forced to fall back to regroup temporarily at a nearby barn. Harry Gifford, their team leader, arrives with FBI Agent Woods, insisting the team gather intel for incoming assault forces. Clegg uses a livestream to broadcast his violent anti-government manifesto and threatens her life on camera. With federal backup miles away, the unit resolves to launch an immediate rescue. Kayce convinces Cal to bring in his former SEAL teammate Garrett for recon, while Belle gets key layout details from Clegg's estranged daughter, Stacy. Andrea manages to break free, calls 911, and cleverly reveals her location. Cal's team decides to breach immediately via a rear weak point. Kayce sends a shaky Garrett to provide overwatch alongside Gifford. Kayce creates a dynamite explosion as a diversion, allowing the team to breach. Inside, Andrea chokes out her guard, and Cal shoots Clegg to stop his suicide before forcing a surrender. Kayce rescues Andrea just as she uses his gun to shoot an ambusher. Afterwards, the marshals gather at East Camp, where Garrett plays guitar under the stars as the team heals together.
10	10	"Playing with Fire"	Darren Grant	Dana Greenblatt & Lyle Mitchell Corbine Jr.	May 3, 2026
After Kayce's barn catches fire, Kayce saves Garrett. Garrett suffers severe burns and lung damage while saving Kayce's horses and undergoes urgent surgery. Deputy Marshals Belle and Andrea escort a prison bus that is derailed by a rockslide, freeing three violent fugitives and leaving the remaining inmates trapped. Among the injured is Samantha, the disgraced mine executive responsible for a disaster that destroyed the town. When Samantha's condition deteriorates, Belle reveals a shocking secret: the mine's former CEO who committed suicide was her father, and Samantha is her estranged mother. Overcoming deep resentment, Belle works with Andrea to perform emergency surgery, saving her mother's life while tentatively confronting their painful past. Meanwhile, Calvin and Miles locate two escapees who have taken hostages at a local general store. When a fugitive threatens a young girl, Miles distracts him, allowing Calvin and Miles to kill one gunman and arrest the other one. Simultaneously, Kayce tracks down the third escapee, Neil — a former hand bearing the Yellowstone brand. Fearing Neil will expose Dutton family secrets in a plea deal, Kayce considers executing him in the woods, but Calvin arrives just in time to intervene.
11	11	"On Thin Ice"	John Erick Dowdle	Mark H. Semos & Maggie Schroeder	May 10, 2026
Trapped in a blizzard inside a freezing cabin, Kayce and Calvin confront past military trauma while sheltering with Neil Lamb. A flashback reveals why the SEAL unit fractured: after an ambush in Afghanistan in 2015, Garrett swore Roner was killed by an RPG, prompting Senior Chief Calvin to order a retreat. Drone footage later showed Roner alive before his execution. To protect Garrett's fragile state, Calvin took the sole blame for leaving Roner behind, sacrificing his bond with Kayce. Calvin finally reveals the truth to Kayce, clearing the air between them, restoring their brotherhood. After falling through lake ice, Calvin suffers severe hypothermia. While recovering, Calvin notices Neil has the same Yellowstone brand as Kayce. When Neil flees, Calvin kills Neil and sinks his body in the frozen lake. Meanwhile, Miles meets with a U.S. Senator at Chairman Rainwater's request, successfully using his Marine background to secure a hearing about the reservation mine. As Neil's armed partner, Don Benson, ambushes Kayce and Calvin in the woods, Andrea and Belle arrive and shoot Benson dead. Returning to the hospital, Kayce, Andrea and Calvin learn the heartbreaking truth: Garrett passed away hours earlier from severe smoke complications, leaving his brothers to mourn his loss.
12	12	"The Devil at Home"	Ruben Garcia	Jim Adler & Tom Mularz	May 17, 2026
Following Garrett's tragic death, Kayce and Calvin begin clearing the debris from the fire. Meanwhile, the U.S. Marshals investigate fugitive Cody Raynor, uncovering a hidden car stash of $1 million cash and a gun linked to a shootout between Jalisco and Sinaloan trafficking crews. Their investigation leads to a Broken Rock property where Kayce discovers barrels of Jalisco cartel fentanyl. When Raynor is murdered in custody, the DEA and Gifford order the Marshals off the case. Facing tribal pressure, Chairman Rainwater worries the cartel's presence will weaken his fight against a government mine. Enraged by the fentanyl overdose death of his childhood friend Sabrina, Miles goes rogue to track down cartel operative Hector Diaz. Maddie informs Calvin of Miles' disappearance, and the Marshals intervene during a forest shootout, killing several gang members. Kayce stops Miles from executing Diaz in cold blood and arrests Diaz. Calvin suspends Miles and confiscates his badge for his recklessness. Elsewhere, Kayce finally finds clarity amidst his grief and asks Tom to walk through the deal. Finally, in a devastating personal revelation, Calvin confesses to Belle that a rare cancer tumour causes his neck pain. Gifford offers Andrea a promotion back to the D.C. office.
13	13	"Wolves at the Door"	Christopher Chulack	Spencer Hudnut	May 24, 2026
Kayce declines Tom's offer for East Camp, opting instead to convert part of his ranch into an equine therapy center for veterans, honoring Garrett. Belle joins Calvin for his cancer treatment in Salt Lake City. Meanwhile, Chairman Rainwater and Mo survive a violent ambush while heading to the airport, suspecting an insider threat. Kayce finds that the watch officer is dead and calls for help. Mercenaries track Rainwater and attack the ranch, leading to a fierce shootout with Kayce, Miles, Tate, Calvin, Belle, and Andrea, killing the attackers. Evidence from the international mercenaries leads Council Member Irons who was killed to look like a suicide, showing he was part of a larger conspiracy. Calvin reinstates Miles, and the group enjoys some fun with a taser and foosball. Miles leaves the bar to join Rainwater in DC and Calvin reconciles with Maddie. Tom invites Tate bass fishing in Texas, leaving Dolly behind with Kayce. Rainwater successfully secures a 60-day mine suspension. As Andrea prepares to fly to D.C., Calvin and Belle uncover the murder of an East Camp ranch hand who had alerted the mercenaries. Later, gunmen fire upon them, with Tom's foreman, Jeb, reporting back to Tom that "it's handled."

=== Season 2 (2026) ===
No. overall	No. in season	Title	Directed by	Written by	Original release date	Viewers (millions)
14	1	"All Hat No Cattle"	Christopher Chulack	Spencer Hudnut	October 4, 2026	8.21
15	2	"End of Watch"	Ruben Garcia	Dana Greenblatt & Bryan Garcia	October 11, 2026	6.93
Kayce and Andrea secures his home following a recent attack while struggling with hypervigilance over Tate. Meanwhile, the team pursues Wayne Plummer, a disgraced former SWAT officer with a deadly vendetta against law enforcement officials who fired him over his career, including killing a man at Butte Reservoir with a sniper rifle. After discovering Wayne's manifesto and a booby-trapped house, the team learns Wayne and his son are actively targeting officers. When a police officer gets killed, Wayne and his son launch a dual-sniper attack outside a coroner's officer. Kayce and Andrea convince the son to surrender, while Cal and Belle ambush and kill Wayne. Simultaneously, political tensions brew within the Broken Rock tribe as Corinne Irons confronts Thomas Rainwater over the financial fallout of his anti-mining campaign. On a personal front, Cal reveals his rare lung cancer diagnosis to the team, promising to undergo chemo and radiation, but he begs Miles to keep it secret from his daughter Maddie. Miles uses this leverage to get himself taken off desk duty. Thomas and his crew repair and purify Kayce's house, where Thomas reassures Kayce that his dedication to Tate sets him apart from his own father, John Dutton.
16	3	"Falling Sky"	Gonzalo Amat	Tom Mularz & Kseniya Melnik	October 18, 2026	7.04
A military-grade drone manufactured by Horus Avionics crashes on the Broken Rock reservation, hitting a propane tank and causing a fatal explosion, which kills an elderly resident. Horus CEO Gavin blames three young reservation activists — Matthew, Koda, and Jacob — claims they are as domestic terrorists who shot their drone down. The Marshals intervene to investigate, but tensions rise as tribal members resist their presence. The situation escalates when Jacob is found murdered, and mercenaries hired by Horus pursue Matthew and Koda to cover up the truth. The team tracks down the survivors, discovering Horus lied: the drone was armed and crashed on its own. After a tactical firefight against Horus's private mercenaries, the Marshals eliminate the operatives, clear the activists' names, and expose the company's cover-up, leading to Gavin's arrest. The incident prompts Chairman Thomas Rainwater to reconsider reservation policies, approving a community cannabis co-op to ease local unrest. On the personal front, Kayce struggles to connect with a traumatized Tate, ultimately deciding to break family precedent by taking him to a therapist. Meanwhile, Andrea suffers from PTSD nightmares from her kidnapping, and Cal faces his first chemotherapy session alone until Belle arrives to support him.
17	4	"Blast Radius"	Guy Ferland	Jim Adler & Maggie Schroeder	October 25, 2026	6.48
Internal tensions mount as Chief Deputy Gifford preps Andrea to replace Cal, who is secretly undergoing cancer treatment. Meanwhile, Miles visits Maddie at the bar, where she admits her dad seemed off during their father-daughter night; Miles knows about Cal's diagnosis but keeps his promise to stay quiet. Pressure also builds on Belle after a loan shark smashes her car window and demands casino debt payments within 48 hours. The team shifts focus to serial bomber Rudy Carpenter — Cal's "white whale" — after learning he has returned to Montana. Kayce and Belle question Rudy's ex-wife, who warns of his escape tactics. Miles dumpster-dives to find evidence linking Rudy to "The Disciples", a gang trading shelter for explosive expertise. The Marshals raid the gang's chop shop, where Kayce uses aggressive interrogation tactics to reveal Rudy has acquired blasting caps. The stakes escalate after Rudy steals eight barrels of industrial explosives, creating a mass-casualty threat. Recognizing a test crater on video footage, Cal tracks Rudy to a farm near Bozeman. As the Marshals surround the property and exchange gunfire, an injured Rudy retreats into a barn. Refusing to surrender, he detonates a bomb via his phone, hurling Kayce and Andrea through the air.
18	5	"Secret Weapon"	Loren Yaconelli	Mark H. Semos & Anthony Florez	November 1, 2026	7.97
Following Rudy Carpenter's suicide explosion, which injured Kayce and Andrea, U.S. Marshals uncover that accomplice Derek McCoy had stolen explosives. The team conducts a raid on the McCoy's family compound, where Kayce chases Derek's brother, Will, into a collapsing building filled with gas. To persuade Will to disclose Derek's escape vehicle, Kayce references his own brother, Jamie. Meanwhile, Andrea interrogates Derek's sister-in-law, Emma, breaking her down by revealing that Derek fathered her child. Emma informs them that Derek plans to attack a hotel in Helena that is hosting a banquet for the bank responsible for their land foreclosure. The marshals then locate Derek's box truck stuck in traffic near the hotel. Andrea distracts Derek while Kayce and Miles ambush the vehicle, killing him just before he can detonate a 2,000-pound bomb. In the aftermath, Marshal Calvin appoints Andrea to lead the unit during his surgery. Concurrently, Belle leverages parole conditions to shut down a loan shark threatening her family over casino debts, and Whitebear seeks political support from Miles against Chairman Rainwater. Eventually, a traumatized Andrea confides in Kayce about her severe PTSD from a past abduction, before she falls asleep on his couch while he watches over her.
19	6	"Roughstock"	Gonzalo Amat	Dana Greenblatt & Kseniya Melnik	November 15, 2026	TBD
20	7	"Under the Influence"	Guy Ferland	Tom Mularz	November 22, 2026	TBD
21	8	"Bad Medicine"	Christopher Chulack	Jim Adler & Anthony Florez	November 29, 2026	TBD
22	9	"Off the Rails"	Darren Grant	Bryan Gracia & Maggie Schroeder	December 6, 2026	TBD

== Production ==
=== Development ===
In March 2025, it was reported that a spin-off of the Paramount Network series Yellowstone starring Luke Grimes, and created by Spencer Hudnut, was in development at CBS. The procedural program, tentatively titled Y: Marshals, was ordered in May from MTV Entertainment Studios and 101 Studios for the 2025–26 television season. Hudnut signed on as showrunner and executive producer, with Grimes, Taylor Sheridan, David C. Glasser, John Linson, Art Linson, Ron Burkle, David Hutkin, Bob Yari, also holding executive producer roles. Amy Reisenbach, the CBS Entertainment president, said the decision was made to air it on CBS rather than release it on Paramount+ (similar to other series from Sheridan) due to the success from the linear broadcasts of the parent show as well as Tulsa King. With Sheridan known for producing high-budget series, concerns were raised about the series budget and how the show would look and feel on a broadcast network rather than cable. Reisenbach responded saying that "we don't do cheap" and that creatively, the show would be similar to Yellowstone, assuring that a proper budget had been allocated.

By August 2025, Paramount Television Studios had taken over production of the series following the merger of parent company Paramount Global with Skydance Media into Paramount Skydance. "Y:" was removed from the title in January 2026, with the show thereafter just known as Marshals; it did however, remain part of the program's visual branding, and was stylized in the same format as the logo of the Yellowstone Dutton Ranch from the parent series. CBS stated that although it had stopped referring to Y: Marshals as a working title, the "Y:" had been "considered silent internally." CBS executives were reportedly confident enough in the success of the series to commission a writers' room for a potential second season in February before the program premiered or was officially renewed, with script work on season two to begin "soon".

In March 2026, CBS renewed the series for a second season.

=== Casting ===
Grimes reprises his role as Kayce Dutton while his character's wife Monica Long Dutton (Kelsey Asbille) dies off-screen between the end of Yellowstone and the start of Marshals. Grimes was initially approached about the spin-off just four months after production on the final season of Yellowstone wrapped, and was initially unsure about it being centered around his character, believing that his arc had been satisfactorily wrapped up. He ultimately decided to proceed once he heard the pitch. Also returning from Yellowstone, Brecken Merrill, Mo Brings Plenty, and Gil Birmingham, were added as series regulars to portray Tate Dutton, Mo, and Thomas Rainwater, respectively. Cast members new to the franchise include Logan Marshall-Green as Pete Calvin, Arielle Kebbel as Belle, Ash Santos as Andrea, and Tatanka Means as Miles, all in regular roles. Additionally, Brett Cullen and Ellyn Jameson were cast in recurring roles as Harry Gifford and Dolly Weaver respectively. In April 2026, it was reported that Riley Green was cast in a recurring capacity, making his acting debut. Rudy Ramos also reprised his role from Yellowstone in the sixth episode, guest starring as Felix Long. For the second season, Yellowstone cast member Jefferson White joined the recurring cast as his character Jimmy Hurdstrom.

=== Filming ===
Principal photography of the series began in mid-2025, taking place in Summit County, Utah, with $52 million designated for production. Yellowstone also filmed its first three seasons in the same location, before its production was moved to Montana ahead of season four due to a lack of tax incentives that were subsequently increased due to the state losing production of that series. The first season, consisting of thirteen episodes, concluded filming that December.

=== Music ===
Brian Tyler and Breton Vivian, who worked on the previous Yellowstone series, composed Marshals'. Milan Records has released the soundtrack.

== Broadcast ==
Marshals started airing on March 1, 2026, as a mid-season replacement on CBS. It is scheduled for Sundays at 8:00 p.m. ET and it is the first series in the franchise to debut on a linear network. Paramount Global Content Distribution handles the show's distribution rights. The first-season finale aired on May 24, 2026. The second season premiered on October 4, 2026.

== Reception ==
The series holds a 45% approval rating on review aggregator Rotten Tomatoes, based on 20 critic reviews with an average rating of 6.0/10. The website's critics consensus reads, "Marshals confines Kayce Dutton within a dim procedural that lacks the narrative spark and intrigue that Yellowstone managed instantly, making this one ham-fisted trek." Metacritic, which uses a weighted average, assigned a score of 57 out of 100 based on 13 critics, indicating "mixed or average". The premiere episode received 9.52 million viewers.

Nick Schager writing for The Daily Beast dismisses the show: "Its fights, chases, and shootouts are CBS-grade lackluster, and the particulars of its stories are of no consequence." Variety considered the show to be "a network law enforcement procedural that bears only a passing family resemblance to 1923, 1883, Yellowstone or even other shows in executive producer Taylor Sheridan's sprawling portfolio."
