= Ash Santos =

American actress (born 1993)

- Santos in 2026
- Born: Ashley Marie Santos; June 9, 1993 (age 33); The Bronx, New York, U.S.
- Occupation: Actress
- Years active: 2015–present
- Known for: American Horror Story
- Spouse: Connor Rockwood (m. 2014; div. 2020)
- Children: 2

Ashley Marie Santos (born June 9, 1993) is an American actress. She is known for playing Emily in the eighth season of the FX horror anthology series American Horror Story, entitled Apocalypse (2018), and most recently as U.S. Marshal Andrea Cruz in the CBS series Marshals (2026).

== Early life ==
Ashley Marie Santos was born in The Bronx, New York. Her father is Puerto Rican and her mother is Dominican. She was raised in Montgomery, New York, where she discovered her love for sports. She always expressed an interest in acting, and after relocating to Salt Lake City, Utah, she started her acting career. In April 2018, she moved her career to Los Angeles.

== Filmography ==
=== Film ===
Year	Title	Role	Notes
2015	Once I Was a Beehive	Paige	
2015	Thirst	Meeka	
2016	Mythica: The Iron Crown	Caia-Bekk	
2016	We All Fall Down	Eve	
2020	Joe Bell	Kim	
2021	Heart of Champions	Nisha	
2021	Night Teeth	Mariah	
2022	Shattered	Lisa	
2024	Half Baked: Totally High	Trisha	
2024	Animal UFO to the Galaxy	Carrie	
2024	Our Little Secret	Sophie	
TBA	Crossed	Cindy	Post-production

=== Television ===
Year	Title	Role	Notes
2015	We All Fall Down	Eve	2 episodes
2015	I'm Not Ready for Christmas	Jordan Jones	TV movie
2016	My Summer Prince	Jess	TV movie
2016	Broadcasting Christmas	Daisy	TV movie
2017	Relationship Status	Charlotte	4 episodes
2017	Wrapped Up in Christmas	Diana Ramos	TV movie
2017	Sharing Christmas	Kimberly	TV movie
2017	The Landlord	Katie	TV movie
2018	American Horror Story: Apocalypse	Emily	Recurring role
2020	FBI: Most Wanted	Amber Matos	Episode: "Ride or Die"
2021	True Story	Daphne	4 episodes
2021	Red Bird Lane	Kesha	TV movie
2022	Mike	Kiki	Episode: "Phoenix"
2023–2024	Mayor of Kingstown	Coco	5 episodes
2025	Pulse	Nia Washington	7 episodes
2026	Marshals	Andrea Cruz	Main role
