= The Outsider (2018 film) =

2018 film by Martin Zandvilet

- Film release poster
- Directed by: Martin Zandvliet
- Written by: Andrew Baldwin
- Produced by: John Linson; Art Linson; Ken Kao
- Starring: Jared Leto; Tadanobu Asano; Kippei Shiina; Rory Cochrane; Shioli Kutsuna; Emile Hirsch
- Cinematography: Camilla Hjelm Knudsen
- Edited by: Mikkel E.G. Nielsen
- Music by: Sune Martin
- Production companies: Linson Entertainment; Waypoint Entertainment
- Distributed by: Netflix
- Release date: March 9, 2018
- Running time: 120 minutes
- Countries: United States; Japan
- Languages: English; Japanese

The Outsider is a 2018 action thriller film directed by Martin Zandvliet and written by Andrew Baldwin. A Japanese-American production, the film stars Jared Leto, Tadanobu Asano, Kippei Shiina, Shioli Kutsuna, and Emile Hirsch.

The Outsider was released by Netflix on March 9, 2018, and received generally unfavorable reviews from critics.

== Plot ==
In 1954, nine years after the Pacific War, ex-United States Marine Corps Captain Nick Lowell is the only non-Japanese inmate in an Osaka prison. Most of his fellow inmates are yakuza criminals, recognizable by their irezumi tattoos. Nick saves a yakuza named Kiyoshi from being hanged to death. The Shiromatsu-ikka, a yakuza family to which Kiyoshi belongs, repays their debt for Nick saving Kiyoshi by arranging for Nick's early release. Once Nick was out of the prison gates, he was brought to the Shiromatsu-ikka's headquarters and was offered a job, a negotiation deal with Anthony Panetti, an American businessman with a deep hatred for the Japanese. However, Panetti has refused to negotiate a deal with the Shiromatsu-ikka but has agreed to a deal with a different clan, the Seizu-kai, because they sent an American negotiator. Nick, angry at the results ends up violently beating Panetti on the head with a typewriter just a minute into the conversation instead, forcing Panetti to reconsider the deal.

When a group of men of the Seizu-kai arrive from Kobe to intimidate the Shiromatsu-ikka at their nightclub, Nick attacks one of them with a bottle after being belittled by one of the Seizu men which nearly causes a shootout. With the stack against them, the Seizu-kai retreated. Kiyoshi takes a liking to Nick, giving him an expensive apartment to live in and a suit to wear. He further entrusts Nick with driving his drunk younger sister Miyu home after he catches her partying at the Shiromatsu-ikka's club. Nick spends the night with her and slowly gets more involved with the Shiromatsu-ikka clan, becoming one of their enforcers alongside Kiyoshi. He continues his relationship with Miyu and gets an irezumi tattoo on his back to match hers.

The Shiromatsu-ikka come under pressure from rival yakuza families, largely due to the aging Shiromatsu-ikka patriarch's refusal to adapt to the rapidly changing post-war economy. Kiyoshi then sends Nick alone for a mission to handle a black market weapons deal at a harbor with a traitorous soldier. However, when Nick arrived at the dock, all he found was a dead person on the floor and subsequently, he is ambushed by four Seizu-kai members, intending to steal the deal for themselves. After failing to find the cash that Nick had brought along for the deal, the Seizu-kai lieutenant orders his men to kill Nick but a quick handed Nick instead wrestled for the gun and in return killing two of the Seizu-kai men. Back at Shiromatsu-ikka's HQ, the patriarch was relieved that Nick had managed to retain the money but was angry that Nick has inadvertently started a war with the Seizu-kai. To avoid a war with the Seizu-kai, Nick and Kiyoshi both perform an act of yubitsume as a form of apology to the patriarch of the Seizu-kai. The severed fingertips was then sent to the Seizu-kai patriarch, who accepts them. Nick is taken to a countryside temple, where he becomes a full member of the Shiromatsu-ikka through an initiation ceremony.

During a sumo contest, the two families hold a meeting, with the Seizu-kai's patriarch offering his counterpart the chance to retire in peace by absorbing the Shiromatsu-ikka, which the patriarch refuses and threatens him. While walking home after the sumo match, Nick is recognized by Lieutenant Paulie Bowers, a US Marine on leave. Paulie remarks that Nick, his former captain, was presumed dead by the Marines after being sought for court-martial. When Paulie tries to blackmail Nick, he lures him back to his apartment and kills him by slashing his neck with a knife.

Nick visits Miyu early next morning only to learn that Miyu was assaulted by her former lover, Orochi who was also fellow yakuza in the Shiromatsu-ikka fold, but Miyu stops him from taking revenge by telling him that she is pregnant. Nick goes to Kiyoshi's home and reveals his relationship with his sister and her pregnancy. Telling Nick that he is now responsible for keeping Miyu safe, Kiyoshi gives him a daishō, a pair of swords signifying honor. The two men then bury Bowers' body in the woods.

A few days later, Nick and Kiyoshi accompanies their patriarch to a tailor shop. Sensing that something was wrong as the patriarch was taking too long, Nick went to the fitting room to check on the boss only to find him being strangled by someone. After pulling the man away, Kiyoshi appeared and shot the man dead. However, the Seizu-kai then sprung their ambush and started to attack the group. The trio then tried to escape with their car but Kiyoshi is shot dead during their escape. It becomes clear that a fifth of the Shiromatsu-ikka, including Orochi, have betrayed the family and defected to the Seizu-kai. Nick persuades the patriarch that war is the only option, and takes part in the assassination of several Seizu-kai members. The Seizu-kai patriarch calls for peace talks at the local harbor, which turn out to be a trap as Orochi kills the Shiromatsu-ikka's patriarch by stabbing him in the back with a knife whilst embracing each other, and Nick is wounded by a shot in the leg from a sniper. Shortly thereafter, police officers burn down the Shiromatsu-ikka's club.

Undeterred, Nick travels to the Seizu-kai dōjō with Kiyoshi's sword and demands an opportunity to kill Orochi. Orochi refuses to fight him and scoffs at Nick, saying that he is only a gaijin (outsider) and could never truly be a yakuza. When Orochi hands him back his sword, Nick quickly draws it and cuts Orochi's throat. The Seizu-kai patriarch intervenes and tells Nick to leave now that he has avenged his patriarch. Nick travels to a secure apartment where he has hidden Miyu under the guard of the few remaining Shiromatsu-ikka members. He embraces her as the yakuza bow reverently signifying that he is now the new head of the Shiromatsu-ikka clan.

== Cast ==
- Jared Leto as Nick Lowell, a former U.S. Marine Captain who is lost from his unit and is later arrested for a series of petty crimes which leads to spending 10 years in a Japanese prison. He becomes attracted to the dangerous lifestyle of the yakuza while in prison, eventually working his way up to becoming the patriarch of a yakuza clan.
- Kippei Shiina as Orochi, a member of the Shiromatsu clan who becomes envious of Nick as he not only gains the trust of his sworn brother Kiyoshi, but also the love of his ex-girlfriend Miyu. He ultimately betrays his family and is murdered by Nick in an act of vengeance.
- Shioli Kutsuna as Miyu, the younger sister of Kiyoshi, who works for the Shiromatsu clan and sports an irezumi tattoo on her back. She becomes attracted to Nick and gets pregnant with his child.
- Tadanobu Asano as Kiyoshi, a senior member of the Shiromatsu clan who becomes Nick's mentor and sworn brother as he rises through the ranks of the yakuza until his death at the hands of a rival clan.
- Nao Ōmori as Hiromitsu Seizu, the young patriarch of the Seizu clan who seeks to expand his family's power at the expense of the Shiromatsu.
- Min Tanaka as Akihiro Shiromatsu, the elderly patriarch of the Shiromatsu clan who refuses to deal with the Seizu, fearing the loss of his family's power.
- Emile Hirsch as Paulie Bowers, an U.S. Marine lieutenant who served under Nick and threatens to expose him, leading to Nick cutting his throat and burying his corpse with Kiyoshi's help.
- Rory Cochrane as Anthony Panetti, the American owner of a scrap metal plant who does business with the yakuza despite his racist views of the Japanese.
- Young Dais as Takeshi
- Ray Nicholson as American Stock Broker

== Production ==
=== Development ===
On November 16, 2016, Netflix entered negotiations with Bloom and AFM to acquire exclusive global rights to the film.

=== Casting ===
Michael Fassbender was considered to star in the film when Daniel Espinosa was in talks to direct. Then, Japanese filmmaker Takashi Miike was slated to direct the film with Tom Hardy in the titular role. However, the search for a new lead after Hardy's departure from the project conflicted with Miike's own commitments, which caused his dropout as well. Jared Leto was confirmed to join the cast on April 5, 2016. Tadanobu Asano was added to the cast on May 12. Rory Cochrane was confirmed to join the cast on November 16. Emile Hirsch was added to the cast on December 6.

=== Filming ===
Principal photography began in Tokyo, Japan in late September 2016. Principal photography wrapped in Osaka, Japan in December 2016.

== Release ==
The film was released on Netflix on March 9, 2018.

=== Critical response ===
On Rotten Tomatoes, the film holds an approval rating of 17% based on 24 critic reviews, and an average rating of 3.6/10. The site's critical consensus reads, "Starring a disengaged Jared Leto and stuffed with gangster cliches, The Outsider never distinguishes itself enough to gain admittance into the inner circle of good yakuza pictures." On Metacritic, the film has a weighted average score of 30 out of 100 based on reviews from 12 critics.

On RogerEbert.com, Nick Allen gave The Outsider 1 1/2 stars. He wrote that "“Jared Leto in a yakuza drama” isn’t the most palatable of pitches, but that somehow turns out to not be the movie's biggest problem." Andrew Barker of Variety magazine called it "Dull, flavorless, and fundamentally incurious, “The Outsider” is a clueless misfire, the cinematic equivalent of a study-abroad student showing off the kanji forearm tattoo whose meaning he never bothered to learn."
