= Mel Pervais =

Canadian-American businessman

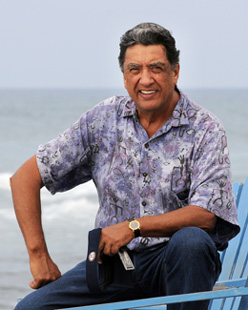
- Born: 1940 (age 85–86); Fort William Reserve, Thunder Bay District, Ontario, Canada
- Occupations: Engineer, entrepreneur
- Known for: Cataract Inc., Rhodium 2001

Melvin "Mel" Pervais (born 1940) is a Canadian-American business executive, entrepreneur, engineer and member of the Ojibwa Nation.

== Early life and education ==
Pervais was born and raised on the Fort William Reserve near Thunder Bay, Ontario, the eldest son of eight children. At age five he began his studies in a one-room schoolhouse, housing eight grades, on the reserve. At age twelve he was sent to a Jesuit-run boarding school for Indian boys, the Garnier Residential School, 500 miles (800 km) away in Spanish, Ontario, and graduated at sixteen.

== Career ==
=== Early career ===
At age sixteen, Pervais started work as a night watchman for the Jones Construction Company. Two months later, he took the opportunity to begin an apprenticeship as an instrument technician with Noranda Mines in Cutler, Ontario. Over the next seventeen years, he held various positions in the power generation industry before joining Johnson Controls in 1973 as the manager of a newly formed calibration engineering department. Pervais redirected the department's focus to nuclear power, boosting sales from $100,000 to $5 million over three years.

=== Cataract Inc. ===
Pervais left Johnson Controls in 1976 and, with his expertise and $10,000, started Amalgamated Services in Philadelphia with a business partner, providing engineering services to nuclear power plants. In 1979 the company merged with Cataract Engineering and Construction and Pervais became president. Never shy about his Indian heritage, Cataract's logo had an Indian motif and the company strived to hire Indian employees. Cataract also used a unique bonus and salary system to discourage sick days and draw talent from other companies; it was not uncommon for workers to out-earn their bosses, with some field technicians earning $90,000 a year. Mel sold the company in 1985. At the time, Cataract had 500 engineers and technicians and reported annual sales of $50 million. Pervais retired at age 45 to focus on a horse breeding and cattle operation on the Chief Joseph Ranch near Darby, Montana. The Los Angeles Times reported in 1984 that Pervais was one of the wealthiest Native Americans in the United States.

=== Rhodium 2001 ===
In 1991, Pervais returned from retirement to found Rhodium 2001, dedicated to recycling materials from scrapped catalytic converters. Pervais put more than $2 million of his own money into the new company, originally housed in a remodeled calving barn on his ranch. Pervais and partner Don Golbeck bought a license to a process developed by metallurgist inventor and chemical engineer C.A. Dickey to refine precious group metals from automotive catalytic converters, a process they used to retrieve a number of materials, including fine sand for the asphalt industry and platinum, palladium and rhodium compounds to sell to refiners.

Rhodium 2001's extraction process is notable for being environmentally friendly, requiring no smelter nor airborne emissions, and for being a closely guarded secret. It took two years of research and development by Dickey, who claimed it involved temperature and pressure. Neither Pervais, nor Dickey, were willing to reveal more about the process than that, for fear that other competitors might adopt it, rendering their company irrelevant. Said Pervais, "If you're an environmentalist, it's probably the greatest invention. I don't need a polluting process. I'd stay retired if that was the case."

== Service and distinctions ==
Pervais, whose grandfather was a tribal chief, has said his father pushed him into the non-Native American world at an early age. "It was the most traumatic thing he ever did," he says. "But it was the best thing he ever did for me." Pervais is an advocate for self-sufficiency in the Native American community and has spoken before to students and other groups arguing that Native Americans must stop relying on federal aid and begin supporting themselves in the free-enterprise system.

In 1982 Pervais was invited by President Ronald Reagan to serve on a private sector task force that encouraged support of community projects including homes for the elderly and day care centers.

Pervais received honorary Doctorates of Engineering from Montana State University in 1995 and Lakehead University in 1996. Pervais is a former member of the United Indian Development Association, a Los Angeles organization that provides consulting services to Indian businesses. He is on the council of trustees with United National Indian Tribal Youth Inc. (UNITY), a national organization promoting personal development, citizenship and leadership among Native American youth.

== Chief Joseph Ranch ==
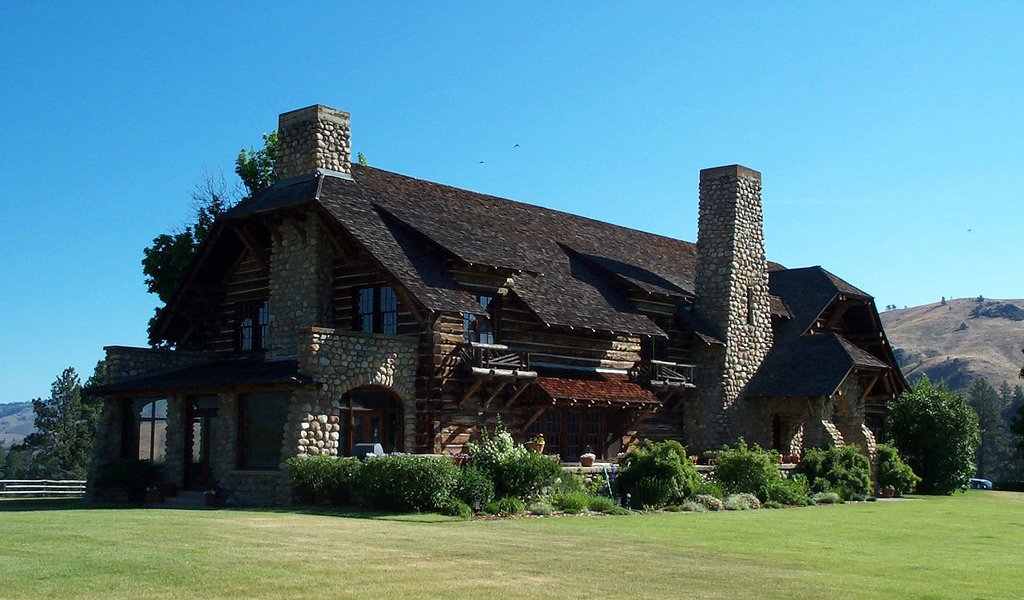
Chief Joseph Ranch near Darby, Montana.

In 1987, Pervais bought the 1,400-acre (5.7 km^{2}) Chief Joseph Ranch, including a 5,000-square-foot (460 m^{2}) lodge built in 1917, a summer home for the family of William S. Ford. After the Fords sold it in 1952, it traded hands several times. When Pervais took it over, the ranch was in poor shape; the barns were falling apart and its perimeter was unfenced. Pervais improved the property and extensively renovated the lodge to its Ford-era conditions over a ten-year period. At the time, he owned a pet bobcat, Toma, named for one of Chief Joseph's wives. Pervais sold the ranch in 2004. Today it is a guest ranch, and also a filming location for the TV series Yellowstone.

== Personal ==
Melvin Pervais married his first love, Patricia, shortly after his graduation from the Garnier Indian School. Together they had 6 children. They later separated, then divorced, but remained close, loving, friends, until Patricia's passing in 2017. Pervais married Lynda Hart Bailey, former wife of lawyer F. Lee Bailey, in 1985. Peter MacDonald, a former Navajo Tribal Chairman, served as Bailey's adopted Navajo "father" and offered twelve wild horses, a traditional dowry to the groom and a Navajo medicine man. In accordance with Pervais' Ojibwa heritage, a second ceremony took place at sundown the day after the wedding on the night of a new moon. Pervais is the father of seven children.
