= John Linson =

American film and television producer

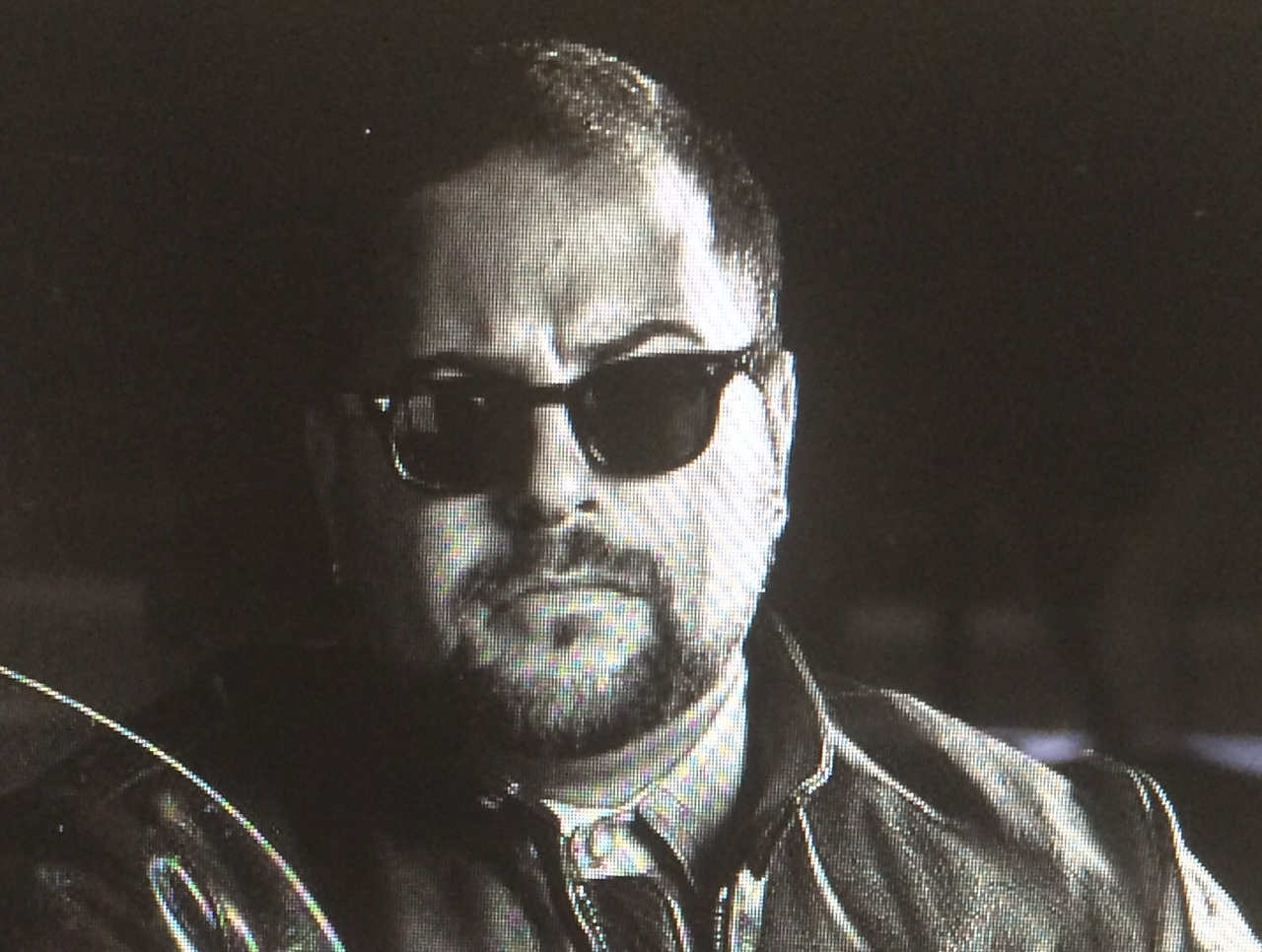
John Linson

John Linson is an American film producer, television producer and founder of Linson Entertainment. He is known for producing films such as Great Expectations, Lords of Dogtown, The Runaways and the television series Sons of Anarchy and Yellowstone.

== Personal life ==
Linson was born in Los Angeles, California. His father is film producer Art Linson. He is a licensed private pilot and longtime motorcycle enthusiast.

== Career ==
John began his career making music videos. Some credits include producing and directing the Porno for Pyros video "Tahitian Moon". He went on to produce Nirvana's Live at the Paramount and the Guns N' Roses mini-documentary entitled Guns N' Roses Don't Cry: Makin' F@*!ing Videos. His first major film production was Great Expectations directed by Alfonso Cuarón. He has since produced films such as Lords of Dogtown, directed by Catherine Hardwicke, and The Runaways directed by Floria Sigismondi, which was named by Rolling Stone as the #1 rock film of all time. His love of motorcycles led to the creation of the FX television series Sons of Anarchy. After the success of Sons of Anarchy he co-created the television series Yellowstone with Taylor Sheridan. Yellowstone premiered on June 20, 2018, on the Paramount Network.

John produced the film The Comedian, an American comedy-drama film directed by Taylor Hackford and written by Lewis Friedman, Richard LaGravenese, Art Linson, and Jeff Ross. The film stars Robert De Niro, Leslie Mann, and Harvey Keitel. John also produced The Outsider, which is an action crime drama film directed by Martin Zandvliet and written by Andrew Baldwin. The film stars Jared Leto and Tadanobu Asano.

== Filmography ==
He was a producer in all films unless otherwise noted.

=== Film ===
Year	Film	Credit	Ref.
1998	Great Expectations	Co-producer	
2000	Sunset Strip		
2005	Lords of Dogtown		
2010	The Runaways		
2016	The Comedian		
2018	The Outsider		

Miscellaneous crew

Year	Film	Role
1989	Casualties of War	Production assistant
1989	We're No Angels	Assistant: Fred C. Caruso

As an actor

Year	Film	Role	Notes
1976	Car Wash	Foolish Father's Son	Uncredited

=== Television ===
Year	Title	Credit	Notes	Ref.
2012	Outlaw Country	Executive producer	Television film	
2008–14	Sons of Anarchy	Executive producer	92 episodes	
2014	The Money	Executive producer	Television film	
2018–2024	Yellowstone	Executive producer	53 episodes	
2022	1883: The Road West	Executive producer	Television special	
2021−22	1883	Executive producer	10 episodes	
2022−2025	1923	Executive producer	16 episodes	
2026–present	Marshals	Executive Producer	13 episodes	
TBA	6666	Executive producer		

As writer

Year	Title	Credit
2018–2024	Yellowstone	Creator (53 episodes) / Stories (2 episodes)
