= Fort William First Nation =

First Nation reserve in Ontario, Canada

Fort William 52
- Indian reserve
- Fort William Indian Reserve No. 52
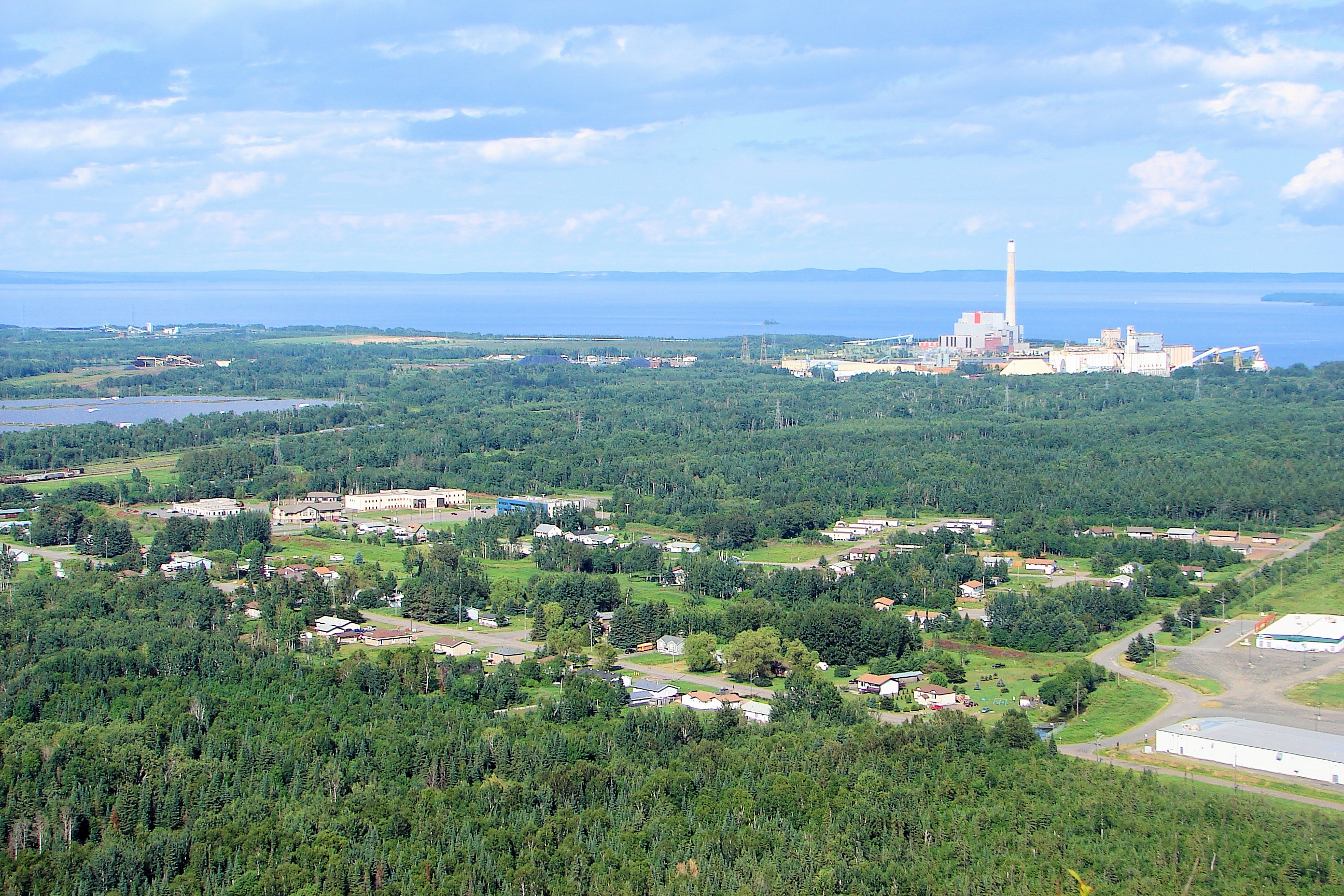

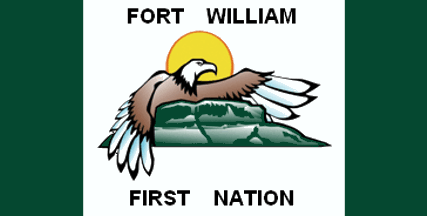
- Flag

- Location within Ontario
- Coordinates: 48°18′N 89°16′W
- Country: Canada
- Province: Ontario
- District: Thunder Bay
- First Nation: Fort William

Area
  - Land: 58.50 km^{2} (22.59 sq mi)

Population (2021)
  - Total: 964
  - Density: 16.5/km^{2} (43/sq mi)
- Website: fwfn.com

Fort William First Nation (Ojibwe: Animkii Wajiw) is an Ojibwa First Nation reserve in Ontario, Canada. The administrative headquarters for this band government is south of Thunder Bay. As of January 2008, the First Nation had a registered population of 1,798 people, of which their on-Reserve population was 832 people.

Fort William First Nation has a two rink arena which was home to the Thunder Bay Bearcats of the Superior International Junior Hockey League until 2009 and has a fitness centre overlooking rink 1. A business park in the eastern end of the community is home to the head offices of Wasaya Airways and the band offices, among others.

== Reserve ==
The First Nation have reserved for themselves the 5,815.1 hectares (14,369 acres) Fort William Indian Reserve 52, which serves as the land base for the First Nation.

== History ==
The Fort William Reserve, located on the western end of Lake Superior adjacent to the city of Thunder Bay was set aside under the provisions of the Robinson-Superior Treaty in 1850. The north shore of Lake Superior is the southern edge of the Canadian Shield, a vast country of rock scraped clean by glaciers and waterways. The traditional territories occupied and used by the Chippewas at Fort William and their residence stretched from Pigeon River to the south, north to Treaty 9 boundary and east to Lake Nipigon.

The Fort William Reserve was created in 1853, as a condition of the 1850 Robinson-Superior Treaty. The Chief and Headmen who signed the Treaty intended that the Reserve would provide not just for their children, but for their grandchildren’s grandchildren. However, most of the best Reserve land was taken within about three generations.

In the negotiations of the Robinson-Superior Treaty, Fort William agreed not to interfere with foreign settlers. In return, the Crown promised cash payments and trade goods, annuities beginning in 1851, complete freedom to continue to hunt and fish as before (except on private land) and a Reserve at Fort William.

At that time, Fort William First Nation was a thriving community. Most people made their living in traditional ways but took advantage of the nearby Hudson’s Bay Post to sell furs and buy supplies. About ten families were employed in the commercial fishery, exporting many barrels of salted fish annually to Detroit and points east.

These were about half of the Fort William Indians who gathered on the Lake Shore seasonally, but spent most of their winters in the interior on their hunting grounds. Unlike the Mission Indians who lived in and around the Jesuit Mission "the Immaculate Conception", the interior Indians were not Christian. They were referred to by officials later as "the pagan branch".

The Indians referred to this aquatic territory on Lake Superior, encompassing the islands off Pie Island, Flatland south to Sturgeon Bay as "The Grand Fishery". These fishing grounds were not a part of the original treaty of 1850 in several petitions sent after the treaty (between 1852–1895) by the Fort William Indians to the Crown requesting that their fishery be protected.

Since the treaty of 1850, Fort William has developed a track record in its dealings with government and private industry in its efforts to become self- sustaining and the hub to Northwestern Ontario aboriginal business and communities.

== Geography ==
Fort William First Nation has a contrasting geography on the shore of Lake Superior. Much of the reserve is swampland near the lake, while the western portion of the reserve is home to the Nor'Wester mountains and Loch Lomond.

Most homes on the First Nation are located in a village on Mission Road. A trailer park is located on reserve land near Chippewa Park, and many cottages are located along Sandy Beach Road.

== Mount McKay/Animkii Wajiw ==
Mount McKay is a mafic sill located south of Thunder Bay, Ontario on the Indian Reserve of the Fort William First Nation. It formed during a period of magmatic activity associated with the large Midcontinent Rift system about 1,100 million years ago.

McKay was originally known as the "Thunder Mountain" (Animkii Wajiw) in the Ojibwe language. The mountain is used by the Ojibwe for sacred ceremonies. Only with the construction of the road were non-First Nations allowed on this land.

A lookout exists on the lower eastern plateau at an elevation of 300 metres (980 ft), providing a view of Thunder Bay and the city’s harbour. A small memorial commemorates Aboriginal people that fought in wars. There is a path on the eastern face of the mountain that can be used for hiking. Plants on the mountain include red and sugar maple and poison ivy (animikiibag—"thunder-leaf" in the Ojibwe language). The top of the mountain has glacial erratics and jack pines. A small grove of yellow birch grows just south of the entrance gate.

A small, unmaintained trail can be used to reach the top from the lookout via the north face, with a heavy gauge steel cable that can be used for support. However, due to the grade and geology (mostly shale) of the face, this unsanctioned hike is considered dangerous and is not recommended for novice hikers.

There is also somewhat of a trail on the west side of the mountain. Shale is predominant in this area, making the western climb considerably less dangerous than the north face.

Mount McKay is the northernmost peak in a range known as the Nor’Wester Mountains.

== Transportation ==
The main roads in Fort William First Nation are Mission Road and Squaw Bay Road. The community on Mission Road has local bus service provided by Thunder Bay Transit. Route 6 Mission serves the community eleven times between 7:30 am and 6:40 pm, Monday to Friday.

== Governance ==
Like many other First Nations communities in Canada, tensions exist at Fort William First Nation between the imposed system of governance (i.e. the "Chief and Council" system) and a traditional Anishinaabe political order. The Chief and Council system was imposed on First Nations across the country as part of Canada's approach to assimilating Indians, and Fort William is no different. This Chief and Council system ushered in a centralized electoral form of governance that repositioned leadership as being more accountable to the Canadian government than to the Anishinaabe people and Anishinaabe political principles. Despite this, however, traditional Anishinaabe law and governance is still practiced within the community; Anishinaabe governance is decentralized and based on emergence, where individuals and families collectively decide on how to proceed on issues that are important to the community. For example, the Robinson-Superior Treaty was signed in part by two Fort William chiefs (rather than one), and families still practice Anishinaabe citizenship law in the community in ways that respect collective self-determination rather than all decisions about who belongs being made by the Fort William band. While the Fort William Chief and Council system had been governed by the Indian Act for generations, the band held its first election under the First Nations Election Act on April 15, 2019.

As a signatory to Robinson-Superior Treaty, Fort William First Nation is a member of Anishinabek Nation, a political organization that represents many of the Anishinaabe First Nation governments in Ontario located about Lake Superior and Lake Huron.

Current Chief and Councilors

The First Nation elect their officials through the Act Electoral System, consisting of a Chief and twelve councillors. The current Chief is Michele Solomon, with the current chief and council term of office lasting May 28, 2023 – May 28, 2027. The current councillors are Leo Bannon Jr., Sheldon Bannon, Jennelle Charlie, Peter Collins, Sherry Pelletier, Kyle Maclaurin, Yvette Greenwald, Desiree Morriseau-Shields, Bonnie Pelletier, Bess Legarde, Jacbo McKay, and Brian Ludwigsen.

Past Chiefs and Councilors

CHIEFS	COUNCILORS	DATE
Joseph Lapouche Chat		Prior to 1821
The Spaniard?		Prior to 1824?
John L’Illinois (Ininway)		Prior to 1828
Joseph Peau de Chat		Prior to 1848
Jacob Wassabe		1852?
William Crow (brother)	Jacob Magatanah	Prior to 1869
John Baptiste Penaisse	Louis Captain; Jawani Binens; Alexie Debakouang	17 Mar. 1880
John Pierre	Alexie Debakouang; Michael St. German	23 Feb. 1883
Thomas Bouche	Andrew Paddy; Clement Cyrette	18 Mar. 1886
Andrew Banan	John Baptiste Penasse; Alex Singleton	18 Mar. 1889
Alex Singleton	Ambrose Cyrette; Andrew Bannon	18 Mar. 1892
Thomas Bushe	Moses McCoy; Louis Deachamp	1 July 1895
Joseph Singleton		05 Apr. 1897
Moses McCoy	Thomas Bushe; Joseph Singleton	5 July 1898
Moses McCoy	Frank Williams; John Baptiste Penassie	6 July 1901
John Baptiste Penassie	Henry Scott; Simon Webobikesige	July 1904
Moses McCoy	John Baptiste Panassie; Simon Waybooslsiki	July 1907
Henry Scott	Frank Williams; Xavier McLaren	July 1910
Luke Bouchie Sr.	Louis Cadieux; Luke Bouchie Jr	8 July 1913
James Louis	Frank Pelletier; Alex McCoy	20 Aug. 1915
Peter Louis	Frank Williams; Joseph Belanger	1 July 1918
Frank Pelletier	Alex McCoy; Edward Louis	July 1921
Andrew Bannon Sr.	Frank Williams; Edward Louis	7 July 1924
Alex McCoy	Edward Louis; Charles Collins	1927
Frank Pelletier	Edward Louis; Charles Collins	July 1930
Frank Pelletier	Laurence Bannon; Zeno Singleton	21 June 1933
Frank Pelletier	Thomas Penassie; Patrick Bannon	8 June 1936
Frank Pelletier	Moses Pelletier; Charles Collins	30 May 1939
Frank Pelletier	Raymond Bannon; Patrick Bannon	8 June 1946
Frank Pelletier	Raymond Bannon; Patrick Bannon	12 May 1949
Frank Pelletier	Martin Bannon; Howard Bannon	9 June 1960
Frank Pelletier	Richard Bannon; John Pelletier	6 June 1962
Frank Pelletier	Catherine Collins; Leonard Pelletier; Ralph Bannon	8 June 1964; 14 Apr. 1965
Frank Pelletier	Leonard Pelltier; Catherine Collins; Howard Bannon	31 May 1966
Louis Pelletier	Howard Bannon; Catherine Collins; Sam Pervais	17 June 1968
Howard Bannon	Leonard Pelletier; Sam Pervais; Harvey Charlie; Richard Bannon	11 June 1970; 26 Feb. 1971
Leonard Pelletier	Louis Pelletier; Sam Pervais; Harvey Charlie; Richard Bannon	5 June 1972
Leonard Pelletier	Sam Pervais; Louis Pelletier; Harvey Charlie; Leo Bannon	5 June 1974
Leonard Pelletier	Sam Pervais; Howard Bannon; Harvey Charlie; Leo Bannon	17 June 1976
Leonard Pelletier	Sam Pervais; Thomas Pelletier; Harvey Charlie; Leo Bannon	31 May 1978
Leo Bannon	Martin Bannon Jr.	8 June 1979; 22 Aug. 1979
Harvey Charlie	Marcel Pelletier; Tom Pelletier; Martin Bannon; Tim Bannon; Carolyn MacLaurin	28 May 1980
Harvey Charlie	Marcel Pelletier; Louis Pelletier; Brian Bannon; Gordon Bannon; Dennis Charlie	10 June 1982
Harvey Charlie	Christine Bannon; Louis Pelletier; Glen Arthur Bannon; Peter Wayne Collins Jr. Dennis Charlie	30 May 1984
Harvey Charlie	Richard Morriseau; Louis Pelletier; Ian Bannon; Peter Wayne Collins Jr. Dennis Charlie	28 May 1986
Christi Pervais	Gordon Bannon; Leo Bannon; Dennis Charlie; Guy Collins; Gary Pelletier; Louis Pelletier; Myles Pervais	26 May 1988
Christi Pervais	Pat Charlie; Tim Bannon; Dennis Charles; Gordon Bannon; Peter Collins Jr. Gary Pelletier; Louis Pelltetier; Maurice Pelletier; Thomas Pelletier	31 May 1990; 03 Mar. 1991
Leo Lawrence Bannon	Harvey Charlie; Thomas Pelletier; Dennie Charles; Sherry Lynn Pelletier; Martin Bannon; Patricia Ann Charlie; Maurice Pelletier; Murray Pelletier; Lyle Charlie Sr. Marvin Pelletier	4 June 1992

== Anishinabek Gitchi Gami Environmental Programs ==
Due to multiple past and present industrial pollution issues affecting Fort William First Nation, citizens developed their own form of civil society to improve the health of the community through grassroots projects. As individuals working together, between 2007 and 2009, they formed a not-for-profit environmental group called Anishinabek Gitchi Gami Environmental Programs (AGG) to address these threats to human and environmental health. The AGG was the first environmental not-for-profit organization in an Ontario First Nation community. The name of this group was derived from the original name for the community (Chippewas of the Gitchigami). "Anishinabek Gitchi Gami" (from Anishinaabeg Gichigami) is Ojibwa for "the people of 'Lake Superior'".

== Animikii Wajiw Miinigoowizwinan (Gifts From the Mountain) Charitable Foundation ==
By late 2014, Fort William First Nation was wrapping up an application to Canada Customs and Revenue Agency for the incorporation of Animikii Wajiw Miinigoowizwinan (Ojibwe Language: Animikii Wajiw Miinigoowiziwinan | Thunder Mountain Gifts) Charitable Foundation. Animikii Wajiw Miinigoowizwinan's head office address is listed as 90 Anemki Drive, Suite 200, Fort William First Nation, ON P7J 1L3.

== Notable members ==
- Mel Pervais, entrepreneur
- Yolanda Bonnell, actress and playwright
- Tanya Talaga, journalist and author
