= The Long Haul (2026 film) =

- Directed by: David Drake
- Written by: David Drake
- Produced by: Sam Bank; Hélène Sifre; Juliet Berman
- Starring: Margo Martindale; Cole Sprouse; Stephen Root; Yalitza Aparicio; Jefferson White; Wes Studi
- Cinematography: Mika Altskan
- Edited by: Sarah Brewerton
- Music by: Chris Roe
- Production companies: Braintrust; Spiral Stairs Entertainment
- Release date: June 7, 2026 (Tribeca Festival)
- Running time: 91 minutes
- Countries: United Kingdom; United States
- Language: English

The Long Haul is a 2026 road drama film written and directed by David Drake (in his feature directorial debut). It stars Margo Martindale, Cole Sprouse, Stephen Root, Yalitza Aparicio, Jefferson White, and Wes Studi.

The film premiered at the Tribeca Festival on June 7, 2026.

== Premise ==
Long-haul trucking has been CJ's entire life. When she receives a letter from the parole board, everything she has been running from finally catches up to her; forcing her to deal with her past, present, and future all at once.

== Cast ==
- Margo Martindale as Carol Jane "CJ", a semitruck driver
- Cole Sprouse as Alex, a semitruck driver and influencer
- Stephen Root as CJ's friend
- Yalitza Aparicio as Araceli, a prostitute CJ helps
- Jefferson White
- Wes Studi

== Production ==
Principal photography had wrapped in March 2025, on a road drama film written and directed by David Drake, and starring Margo Martindale, Cole Sprouse, Stephen Root, Yalitza Aparicio, Jefferson White, and Wes Studi. In April 2026, the film was the first to be selected to screen at the Tribeca Festival.

== Release ==
The Long Haul premiered at the Tribeca Festival on June 7, 2026.
