= Our Little Secret (film) =

2024 film by Stephen Herek

- Official release poster
- Directed by: Stephen Herek
- Written by: Hailey DeDominicis
- Produced by: Lisa Gooding; Mike Elliott
- Starring: Lindsay Lohan; Ian Harding; Tim Meadows; Jon Rudnitsky; Henry Czerny; Judy Reyes; Chris Parnell; Kristin Chenoweth
- Cinematography: Graham Robbins
- Edited by: Heath Ryan
- Music by: Emily Bear
- Production companies: Capital Arts Entertainment; Good Entertainment Inc.
- Distributed by: Netflix
- Release date: November 27, 2024
- Running time: 101 minutes
- Country: United States
- Language: English

Our Little Secret is a 2024 American romantic comedy film directed by Stephen Herek and written by Hailey DeDominicis. It stars Lindsay Lohan, alongside an ensemble cast featuring Ian Harding, Tim Meadows, Jon Rudnitsky, Judy Reyes, Henry Czerny, Chris Parnell, and Kristin Chenoweth. The film was a part of Lohan's creative partnership with Netflix, under which she also executive produced the project.

Our Little Secret follows Avery (Lohan), who is spending her first Christmas with her boyfriend's family but discovers her ex is also part of the holiday festivities and decides to hide their romantic history. Production began in Atlanta, in January 2024, and concluded late in the following month. The film was released on Netflix, on November 27, 2024. It received mixed reviews from critics and debuted at number one on the streaming service's most watched films list, where it stayed for two weeks.

== Plot ==
Avery and Logan have been connected since childhood, evolving from close friends to a couple. In 2014, when Avery readily accepts an opportunity to work in London, he tries to propose at her farewell party. Uncomfortable with the pressure, she rejects his proposal and breaks up with him.

Ten years later, they meet again by chance, at Christmas, each dating siblings Cameron and Cassie Morgan. Mortified, Avery convinces Logan to keep their past secret, due to their partners' overbearing mother, Erica. While the Morgan family gathers for their annual portrait, the two are sent to pick up a tree.

Logan asks Avery, an expert in business proposals, to help with an architectural pitch. In return, he will help her win over the Morgans. Later, Avery mistakenly eats THC gummies from the youngest Morgan Callum's coat pocket.

Logan realizes the mistake and tries to cancel the reading Avery had volunteered for to impress the Morgans at 4 p.m. mass. As the edibles kick in, she ends up improvising and recounts the Bethlehem story by reciting lyrics from Kool & the Gang's "Celebration". The congregation surprisingly joins in, earning her praise from the priest.

That evening, having the munchies, Avery eats Erica's prized chocolate chip cookies. Blaming Erica's dog, Erica panics as chocolate is toxic in dogs and rushes the small animal to the vet. Avery goes along, privately admitting her guilt to the veterinarian, so paying a hefty bill to keep it secret. She spins the ordeal as heroic upon returning, but Logan scolds her for risking their cover. Callum overhears and promises to keep their secret but takes Avery's number, suggesting it will cost them.

During a night out, Cameron's ex-girlfriend, Sophie, unexpectedly joins the group. When Avery is called by her father's real estate agent, seeking the house key, Logan volunteers to drive her. In her childhood home, Avery shares how much she misses her deceased mom, and Logan comforts her. On the way back, they detour to pick up an intoxicated Callum, to whom they had earlier provided alcohol.

At Christmas Eve dinner, there are multiple revelations. Avery and Logan's shared small-town origin is revealed, and Sophie announces she is moving back to town. Logan accidentally discovers Erica's husband Leonard having an affair with Sophie's mother and Stan's wife, Marge.

During Secret Santa, gifts get switched, leading to more awkwardness. As Avery and Logan scold Callum in private, Logan's mother and grandmother show up by surprise. He warns his mother to pretend to not know Avery, but the senior quickly exposes the exes. Soon, more secrets unravel, as Callum exposes Avery's earlier lies and Leonard's affair is revealed. Avery leaves the Morgan house.

Avery's father returns from his trip, surprising her with the key to her childhood home, as Logan told him she wanted it. Avery, in turn, pushes Erica to give Logan's proposal to Stan, which eventually lands him the job.

At Avery's housewarming, Logan asks for a second chance. They confess their love and kiss. A year later, they are planning their wedding and living together. Logan's boss Stan drops off a tin of cookies, before meeting with the Morgan's children with his new love, Erica. Some time later, Avery and Logan get married.

== Cast ==
- Lindsay Lohan as Avery
- Ian Harding as Logan
- Tim Meadows as Stan
- Jon Rudnitsky as Cameron
- Henry Czerny as Mitchell
- Judy Reyes as Margaret
- Chris Parnell as a veterinarian
- Kristin Chenoweth as Erica
- Dan Bucatinsky as Leonard
- Katie Baker as Cassie
- Jake Brennan as Callum
- Ash Santos as Sophie
- Brian Unger as Paul
- Bobbie Eakes as Cheryl

== Production ==
On January 22, 2024, Netflix revealed that Lindsay Lohan would be starring in Our Little Secret with principal photography underway in Atlanta and ran through late February. Kristin Chenoweth, Ian Harding, Jon Rudnitsky, Chris Parnell, Tim Meadows, Dan Bucatinsky, Henry Czerny, Katie Baker, Ash Santos, Jake Brennan and Brian Unger were also announced to star. Stephen Herek was set to direct from a script written by Hailey DeDominicis in her first produced screenplay credit. Mike Elliott and Lisa Gooding served as producers, with Joseph P. Genier executive producing the film. The project is a part of Lohan's two-picture partnership with Netflix she entered in March 2022 and marked her third consecutive romantic comedy for the streaming service, following Falling for Christmas (2022) and Irish Wish (2024).

Lohan described the film as more grounded and relatable compared to her previous Netflix projects, stating: "I love that because my character goes through a very real-life, kind of romantic struggle where she revisits someone from her past that she had a relationship with prior, and it's kind of a tug-of-war situation where she doesn't know what to do." Lohan and Harding revealed they filmed the more vulnerable moments between their characters first which allowed them to understand their connection and how close they were before shooting the "awkward" scenes. Harding said that the opportunity to star alongside Lohan drew him to the project. Chenoweth stated her love for playing a "villain" drew her to the character and compared it to The Real Housewives of Atlanta, adding that comedians like Teri Garr and Carol Burnett inspired her performance. They disclosed "a lot" of the movie was shot on a sound stage. Dan Bucatinsky was hesitant at first about taking on the role due to his character's age and lack of screen time, but was able to contribute with ad libs and suggestions to the script which expanded his role and ended up considering it one of the most "enriching" experiences of his career.

The film was originally titled "Merry Exmas", but Lohan suggested changing it to avoid the project being associated solely with Christmas, explaining: "That was a big part of me choosing to do this movie [it's] the story of a girl that's going through a real life situation and it just happens to be at Christmastime [...] it's not Christmas overload." Lohan appreciated Netflix giving her a producing credit allowing her to have more control: "I got to really be a full-on producer, not just an executive. They trusted me with holding the reins and took my ideas and thoughts on board whether it came down to casting or costuming, and even some of the edits in the film."

== Music ==
Our Little Secret

Soundtrack album by Emily Bear
- Released: November 27, 2024
- Recorded: 2024
- Genre: Film soundtrack
- Length: 32:06
- Label: Netflix

Emily Bear composed the original score for Our Little Secret. Netflix Music released a soundtrack album featuring the movie's score and the song "Happiest Christmas Tree" performed by Aliana Lohan on November 27, 2024.

1. "Happiest Christmas Tree" (Aliana Lohan)
2. "The First Morning"
3. "10 Years Later"
4. "Avery Leaves"
5. "Gummies"
6. "The Introduction"
7. "Driving to the Parents"
8. "You Were Running Away"
9. "Secret Santa"
10. "Bathroom Talk"
11. "A Deal"
12. "The Prospectus"
13. "Cookie Caper"
14. "Our Little Secret"
15. "Dad’s Toast"
16. "Avery Delivers Prospectu"
17. "Followed"
18. "Best Christmas Ever"
19. "Are You Done?"

== Release ==
Our Little Secret was released by Netflix on November 27, 2024. The film received screenings at the Bay Theater in Los Angeles starting on the same day. It debuted at number one on Netflix's most watched films list the day after its release and became the overall top-streamed title worldwide on Netflix for the week of November 23–29 with 32.4 million views. It remained the top-streamed Netflix title globally for a second consecutive week from December 2–8. In the United States, it was the most-streamed original film for the week of November 29–December 5 with 1 billion minutes watched, according to data provided by Luminate, topping Variety's Streaming Originals films chart. It similarly also ranked at number one on Nielsen's most-streamed movies for the week of November 25–December 1 with 1.04 billion minutes watched. As of December 17, 2024, Our Little Secret was the most-watched holiday movie released in 2024 by U.S. households that season, according to smart TV data collected by Samba TV.

== Reception ==
On the review aggregator website Rotten Tomatoes, 37% of 35 critics' reviews are positive, with an average rating of 4.7/10. The website's consensus reads: "Lindsay Lohan and Ian Harding try their best to elevate a tired script, but Our Little Secret is too clumsy for its screwball antics to land." Metacritic, which uses a weighted average, assigned the film a score of 41 out of 100, based on eight critics, indicating "mixed or average" reviews.

Emily Zemler of the Observer stated that the film "doesn't quite give [Lohan] her due" as Harding is a "solid romantic leading man" and the story would have "benefited from more of their history" and that their "big secret depletes the story of tension, especially since other characters are keeping actual, somewhat revelatory secrets." Benjamin Lee of The Guardian compared the film to Meet the Parents and Four Christmases, calling it a "perfectly adequate Christmas comedy that could do with a boost." Variety's Owen Gleiberman wrote: "You watch Our Little Secret, seeing through the paper-thin contrivances, tittering at the imbecilities, and somehow that all becomes part of the experience. It's mainstream fodder as downgraded camp. It’s pablum so numbing it makes you feel good." Writing for RogerEbert.com, Marya E. Gates describes Lohan as a "sharp screwball comedienne" who "crafts an easy chemistry with Harding," also praising Chenoweth as a "fantastic [...] bless-your-heart Southern Queen Bee," concluding that the film makes the case that "if studios would back these kinds of mid-budget films for theatrical release, maybe we'd have movie stars again." Randy Myers of The Mercury News called the film "one of the better holiday confections to drop down the chimney this year." Writing for Newsday, Robert Levin said: "The career resurgence of Lohan remains a good thing. Her talent's intact. She does whatever she can with Avery. It's not her fault, at least when it comes to her acting. She needs better projects, as soon as possible," assessing, "As an executive producer though, Lohan might bear some responsibility. It is, after all, hard to imagine a more uninspired movie."
