= Mo Brings Plenty =

Oglala Lakota actor (born 1969)

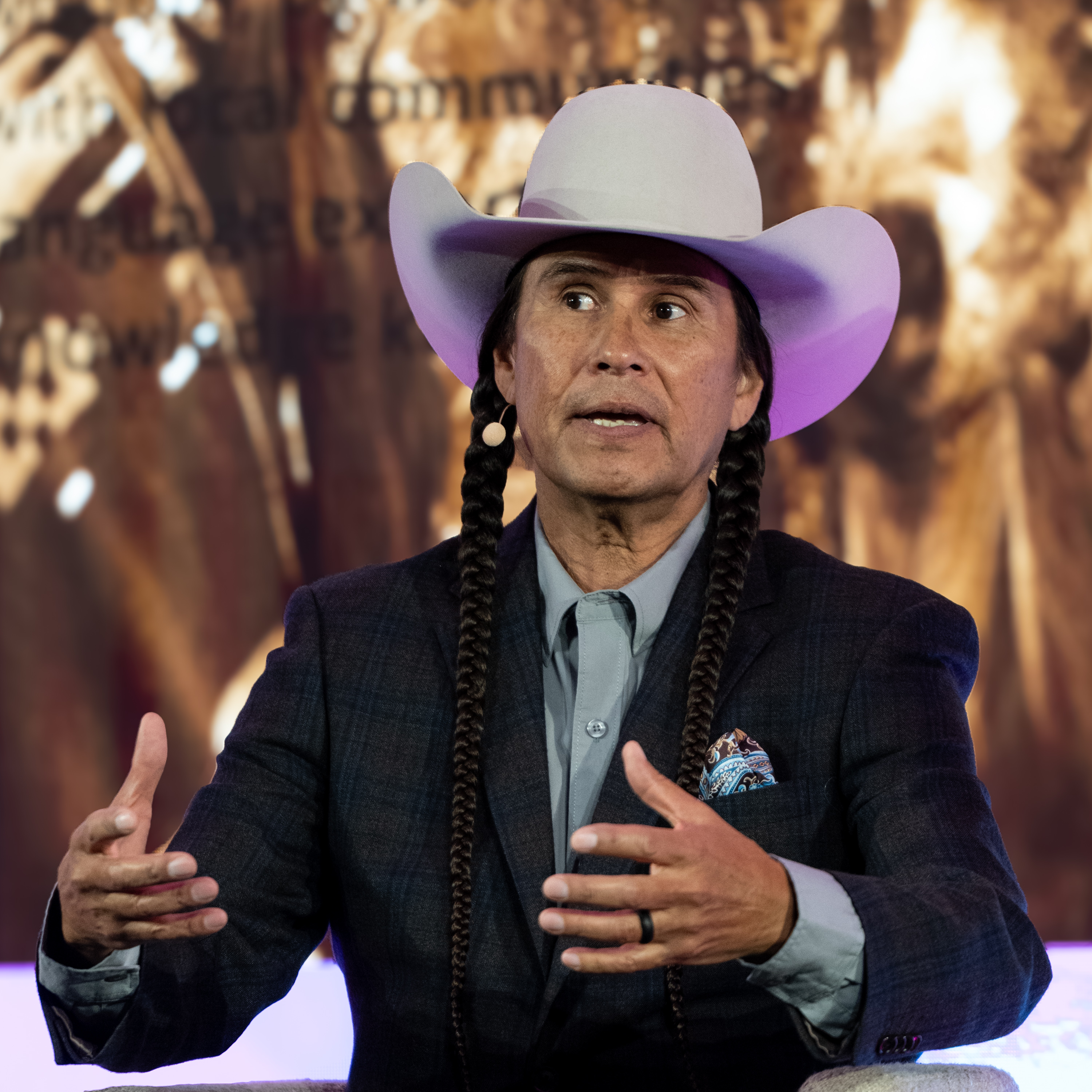
- Mo Brings Plenty at SXSW London, June 2025
- Born: Moses J. Brings Plenty; September 4, 1969 (age 57); Pine Ridge Reservation, South Dakota, U.S.
- Occupation: Actor
- Notable work: Yellowstone; Marshals

Moses J. Brings Plenty (born September 4, 1969), known professionally as Mo Brings Plenty, is an Oglala Lakota television, film, and stage actor, as well as a traditional drummer and singer. He is best known for his portrayal as Mo in the Paramount Network series Yellowstone, and the sequel, Marshals.

== Early life and family ==
Moses Brings Plenty was born on the Pine Ridge Reservation, in South Dakota. He is a direct descendant of Brings Plenty, an Oglala Lakota warrior who fought in the Battle of Little Big Horn.

His nephew Cole Brings Plenty portrayed Pete Plenty Clouds in two episodes of 1923. Cole was found dead on April 5, 2024, at the age of 27, after having been reported missing five days prior.

== Acting career ==
As an actor, Brings Plenty has played bit parts in Hidalgo, Thunderheart, and Pirates of the Caribbean. He also played Quanah Parker in the History Channel documentary Comanche Warrior, which was filmed on the Wild Horse Sanctuary in the southern Black Hills; Crazy Horse on History Channel's Investigating History documentary "Who Killed Crazy Horse"; and the BBC documentary series The Wild West. He acted in Rez Bomb, considered to be the first movie with a universal storyline set on a reservation. Rez Bomb has been part of the international film festival circuit instead of playing strictly to Native American film festivals, which is a major breakthrough for Native cinema.

In addition to doing theater work in Nebraska, he also portrayed an Apache warrior in the 2011 science fiction western film Cowboys & Aliens and Shep Wauneka in Jurassic World Dominion in 2022.

Brings Plenty plays Mo in the Paramount series Yellowstone. His role has grown through each season, finally becoming a series regular in season five. He is also the show's Native affairs coordinator, working with tribes to ensure that the Native languages and cultures are represented correctly.

Moses Brings Plenty was one of the experts who tested and displayed the weapons and tactics used by Oglala Lakota war leader Crazy Horse in an episode of the third season of Spike TV's Deadliest Warrior. He appeared in the sixth episode of the fourth season of AMC's Hell on Wheels. He also appeared in all seven episodes of the 2020 historical drama miniseries, The Good Lord Bird.

Moses has also appeared in 2023's Lawmen: Bass Reeves, on Paramount Network.

== Music, dance, and modeling career ==
Brings Plenty played drums for the band Brulé, who combines traditional Native American drums and flute with contemporary musical instruments. He performs with and drums for the Many Moccasins Dance Troupe, based in Winnebago, Nebraska, that combines modern Native American dance with powwow dances.

Brings Plenty has modeled for Ed Hardy and John Yaeger.

== Activism ==
Brings Plenty is concerned about providing accurate representations of Native peoples in mass media. He stated in a 2008 interview, "Young people told me they don’t see our people on TV. Then it hit me, they are right. Where are our indigenous people, people who are proud of who they are?" Brings Plenty also works behind the scenes on Yellowstone and its spin-off prequels 1883 and 1923 as Taylor Sheridan's American Indian Affairs Coordinator to make sure that each show appropriately represents Native culture.

He has performed for charity events such as Project Lighthouse, who provides warm clothing and bedding to northern Indian reservations.

Brings Plenty has been a vocal opponent of the development of an A.I. data center near his ranch in Osawatomie, Kansas.

== Filmography ==
=== Film ===
| Year | Title | Role | Notes |
|---|---|---|---|
| 2008 | Rez Bomb | Johnny | |
| 2011 | Cowboys & Aliens | Apache Warrior #2 | |
| 2013 | The Cherokee Word for Water | Charlie Soap | |
| 2022 | Jurassic World Dominion | Shep Wauneka | |
| 2023 | Dead Man's Hand | Mahto | |

=== Television ===
| Year(s) | Title | Role | Notes |
|---|---|---|---|
| 2007 | The Wild West | Crazy Horse | Episode: "Custer's Last Stand" |
| 2011 | Deadliest Warrior | Himself | Episode: "Crazy Horse vs. Pancho Villa" |
| 2012 | American Experience | Crazy Horse | Episode: "Custer's Last Stand" |
| 2014 | House of Cards | Chief Whitehall | Episode: "Chapter 21" |
| 2014 | Hell on Wheels | White Feather | Episode 6: "Bear Man" |
| 2016 | The American West | Sitting Bull | 8 episodes |
| 2018 | The Men Who Built America: Frontiersmen | Blackfish | Episode 1: "Into The Wilderness" |
| 2018–2024 | Yellowstone | Mo | 39 episodes |
| 2020 | The Good Lord Bird | Ottawa Jones | |
| 2023 | Lawmen: Bass Reeves | Minco Dodge | |
| 2026 | Marshals | Mo | Main role |

== Awards and achievements ==
On April 12, 2024, Brings Plenty was honored with a New Horizon Award, a lifetime achievement award given out at the annual Western Heritage Awards at the National Cowboy & Western Heritage Museum. Brings Plenty dedicated the award to his nephew, Cole.
