= Jefferson White =

American actor (born 1989)

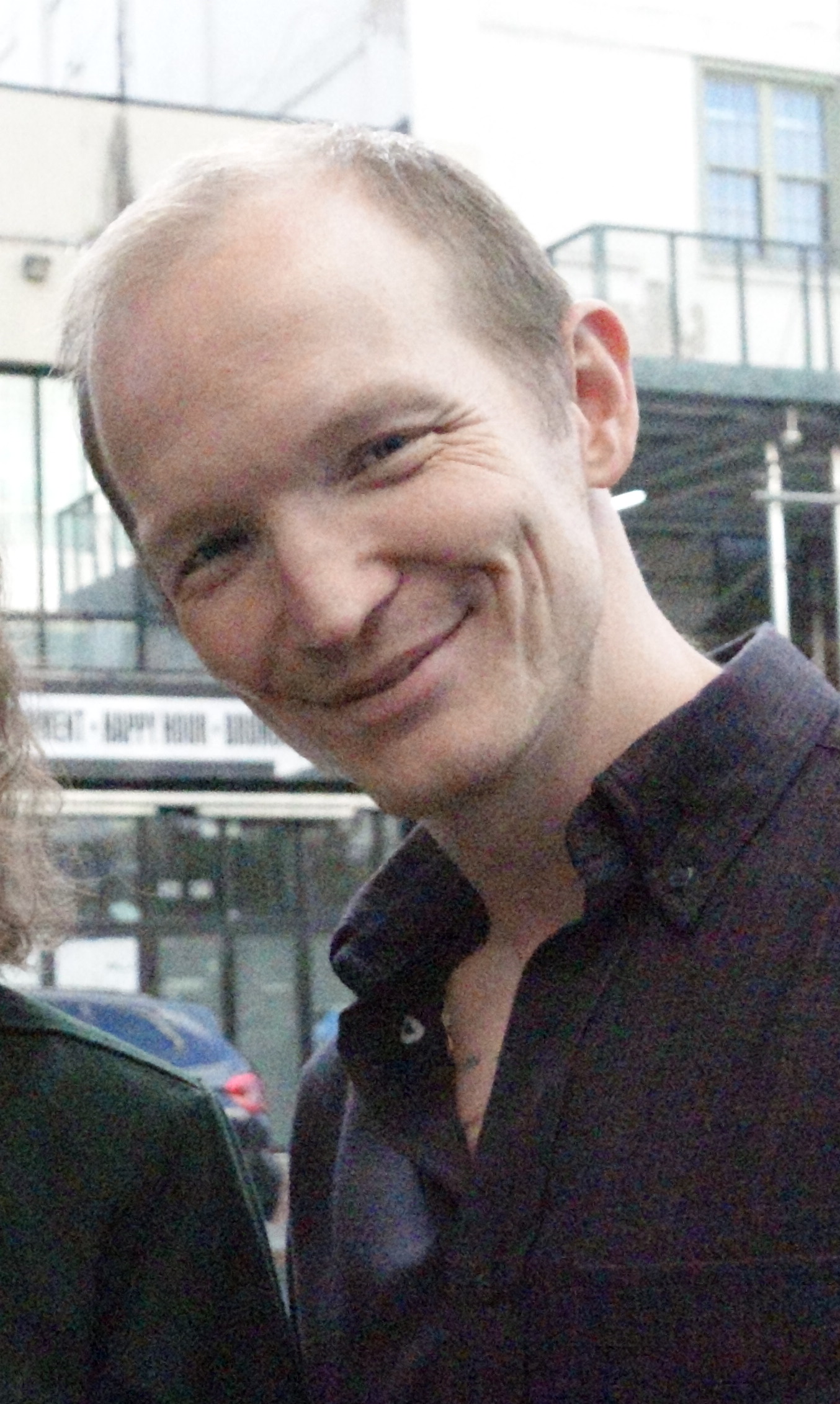
- Born: 3 November 1989 (age 37); Mount Vernon, Iowa, United States
- Education: Iowa State University
- Occupation: Actor
- Spouse: Casey Wortmann

Jefferson White (born November 3, 1989) is an American actor, best known for his role as Jimmy Hurdstrom on the television series Yellowstone (2018–2024).

== Early life ==
White grew up in Mount Vernon, Iowa and attended Iowa State University, graduating in 2012 in performing arts. He appeared in many productions at Iowa State, including his first leading role as Tupolski in The Pillowman directed by Don Watts.

== Career ==
White made his television debut on The Americans in 2014. Other television appearances include Elementary, Blue Bloods, How to Get Away with Murder and Law & Order: Special Victims Unit.

In 2018, White appeared as a series regular on season one of Yellowstone for Paramount Network, and his character, a stoner called Jimmy who, due to his grandfather asking a favor of John Dutton (Kevin Costner), is taken on as a branded cowboy of the Yellowstone. In 2021, White was named as a nominee for the Screen Actors Guild Award for Outstanding Performance by an Ensemble in a Drama Series for his work on Yellowstone. White's character Jimmy had been expected to feature in a forthcoming Yellowstone spin-off series titled 6666 as his character Jimmy moved to the 6666 Ranch in Texas during season 4 of Yellowstone, however once that series had been aborted the character was instead reported to appear in the second series of spin-off show Marshals featuring the character Kayce Dutton (Luke Grimes). White's character Jimmy also returned for cameo appearances in the fifth season of Yellowstone in 2024.

In September 2022, White portrayed the character Sean O'Neil in the tenth season of NBC's long-running drama Chicago P.D. White had roles in the 2023 feature film Eileen, which stars Anne Hathaway, and the 2024 Alex Garland film Civil War.

In February 2025, White was announced as narrator for the audio edition of Sunrise on the Reaping, a dystopian novel written by the American author Suzanne Collins. It is the second prequel novel to the original The Hunger Games trilogy, following The Ballad of Songbirds and Snakes, released in 2020.

== Personal life ==
White is married to Casey Wortmann, an actress and social worker.

== Filmography ==
Key
†	Denotes works that have not yet been released

=== Film ===
Year	Title	Role	Notes
2021	No Future	Chris	
2022	God's Country	Samuel	
2023	Eileen	Buck Warren	
2024	Civil War	Dave	
2024	Hellboy: The Crooked Man	Tom Ferrell	
2025	Drink and Be Merry	Chet	Also executive producer
2025	Caravan	Jason	Also director and writer
2026	Bedford Park	Jay	
2026	Bonding	Cam	
2026	The Long Haul	Wayne Lemahieu	
2026	The Hunger Games: Sunrise on the Reaping	Mr. McCoy	
2026	November 1963 †	Lee Harvey Oswald	Post-production
2027	John Rambo †		Post-production
TBA	Death of a Brewer †	Joe Lund	Post-production
TBA	Ally Clark †		Post-production

=== Television ===
Year	Title	Role	Notes
2014	The Americans	Brad Mullin	2 episodes
2014–2015	Manhattan	Cole 'Iowa' Dunlavey	9 episodes
2015	Law & Order: Special Victims Unit	Gary	Episode: "Intimidation Game"
2015	Elementary	Dorian Moll	Episode: "Tag, You're Me"
2015–2016	How to Get Away with Murder	Philip Jessup	7 episodes
2016–2017, 2020	Blindspot	Parker	10 episodes
2016	Blue Bloods	Eric Carlson	Episode: "Whistleblowers"
2016	Aquarius	Gary Hinman	3 episodes
2016–2017	House of Cards	Joshua Masterston	3 episodes
2018	The Alienist	Lincoln Steffens	4 episodes
2018–2024	Yellowstone	Jimmy Hurdstrom	Main role
2019	The Twilight Zone	Jerry Pierson	Episode: "Six Degrees of Freedom"
2021	The Bite	Clem	4 episodes
2021	The Good Fight	Clay	Episode: "And the End Was Violent..."
2021	Invasion	Daniel Myers	Episode: "Last Day"
2022–2023	Chicago P.D.	Sean O'Neil	4 episodes
2023	Ink Master	Himself	Guest judge (Season 15)
2024	Evil	Tyrus	Episode: "How to Dress a Wound"
2025	You	Dane Robinson	2 episodes
2026	Boston Blue	Greg McKean	Episode: "Anatomy of a Bomb"
2026	The Hunting Party	Lou Kaplan	Episode: "Lou Kaplan"
2026	Marshals	Jimmy Hurdstrom	Recurring role
