= Yellowstone (TV series) =

American television series (2018–2024)

- Genre: Drama; Neo-Western
- Created by: Taylor Sheridan; John Linson
- Written by: Taylor Sheridan; John Linson; Brett Conrad; John Coveny; Ian McCulloch; Eric Beck
- Starring: Kevin Costner; Luke Grimes; Kelly Reilly; Wes Bentley; Cole Hauser; Kelsey Asbille; Brecken Merrill; Jefferson White; Danny Huston; Gil Birmingham; Forrie J. Smith; Denim Richards; Ian Bohen; Finn Little; Ryan Bingham; Wendy Moniz; Jennifer Landon; Kathryn Kelly; Mo Brings Plenty
- Composers: Brian Tyler; Breton Vivian
- Country of origin: United States
- Original language: English
- No. of seasons: 5
- No. of episodes: 53 (list of episodes)

Production
- Executive producers: John Linson; Art Linson; Taylor Sheridan; Kevin Costner; David C. Glasser; Christina Alexandra Voros; Michael Friedman
- Producers: John Vohlers; Michael Polaire
- Cinematography: Ben Richardson
- Editors: Chad Galster; Gary D. Roach; Evan Ahlgren
- Camera setup: Single-camera
- Running time: 37–92 minutes
- Production companies: Linson Entertainment; Bosque Ranch Productions; Treehouse Films; 101 Studios (seasons 2–5); MTV Entertainment Studios (seasons 4–5)

Original release
- Network: Paramount Network
- Release: June 20, 2018 – December 15, 2024

Related
- Yellowstone franchise

Yellowstone is an American neo-Western drama television series created by Taylor Sheridan and John Linson for Paramount Network. The series premiered on June 20, 2018, and concluded on December 15, 2024, after five seasons comprising 53 episodes. It stars Kevin Costner, Luke Grimes, Kelly Reilly, Wes Bentley, Cole Hauser, Kelsey Asbille, and Gil Birmingham. The series follows the conflicts surrounding the Yellowstone Dutton Ranch along the borders of the neighboring Broken Rock Indian reservation, Yellowstone National Park, and land development interests, while also focusing on the Dutton family's internal conflicts.

Taylor Sheridan began developing the series in 2013 after becoming dissatisfied with acting and shifting his focus to screenwriting. Drawing from his experiences living in rural Texas and Wyoming, he set the series in Montana. He initially pitched it to HBO, which declined the project. In May 2017, Paramount Network ordered Yellowstone as its first scripted series, with Taylor Sheridan serving as writer, director of several episodes, and executive producer.

The series became the first installment in the Yellowstone franchise, which has since expanded to include the prequel series 1883 (2021–2022) and 1923 (2022–2025), as well as the spin-offs Marshals (2026–present) and Dutton Ranch (2026–present). Additional spin-offs remain in various stages of development.

== Premise ==
The series follows the Dutton family, owners of the largest cattle ranch in Montana, the Yellowstone Dutton Ranch (located in Darby), commonly called "the Yellowstone". The plot revolves around family drama at the ranch and the bordering Broken Rock Indian Reservation, Yellowstone National Park, and land developers.

== Cast and characters ==
- Kevin Costner as John Dutton III, owner of the Yellowstone ranch, patriarch of the Dutton family, and father of Lee, Beth, Kayce, and Jamie (adopted)
  - Josh Lucas as younger John Dutton (recurring seasons 1, 5; guest season 2)
- Luke Grimes as Kayce Dutton, a former Navy SEAL, John's younger son. Married to Monica Dutton.
  - Rhys Alterman as young Kayce Dutton (guest seasons 1–2)
- Kelly Reilly as Bethany "Beth" Dutton, works in finance and is the only daughter of John Dutton III.
  - Kylie Rogers as young Beth Dutton (recurring season 5; guest seasons 1–3)
- Wes Bentley as James Michael "Jamie" Dutton, Lawyer/politician, adopted son of John Dutton III. Garrett Randall was the biological father.
  - Dalton Baker as young Jamie Dutton (guest seasons 1–3)
- Cole Hauser as Rip Wheeler, Beth's husband. Raised by John and loyal ranch foreman.
  - Kyle Red Silverstein as young Rip Wheeler (recurring season 5; guest seasons 1–3)
- Kelsey Asbille as Monica Long Dutton, wife of Kayce.
- Brecken Merrill as Tate Dutton, Kayce and Monica's son. John's only grandson.
- Jefferson White as Jimmy Hurdstrom
- Danny Huston as Dan Jenkins (seasons 1–2)
- Gil Birmingham as Chief Thomas Rainwater
- Forrie J. Smith as Lloyd Pierce (seasons 3–5; recurring seasons 1–2)
  - Forrest Smith (guest season 2) and Forrest Wilder (recurring season 5) as young Lloyd Pierce
- Denim Richards as Colby Mayfield (seasons 3–5; recurring seasons 1–2)
- Ian Bohen as Ryan (seasons 4–5; recurring seasons 1–3)
- Ryan Bingham as Walker (seasons 4–5; recurring seasons 1–3)
- Finn Little as Carter (seasons 4–5)
- Wendy Moniz as Governor / Senator Lynelle Perry (season 5; recurring seasons 1, 3; guest seasons 2, 4)
- Jennifer Landon as Teeter (season 5; recurring seasons 3–4)
- Kathryn Kelly as Emily (season 5; recurring season 4)
- Mo Brings Plenty as Mo (season 5; recurring seasons 1–4)

== Episodes ==
Season	Episodes		Originally released	
Season	Episodes		First released	Last released
1	9		June 20, 2018	August 22, 2018
2	10		June 19, 2019	August 28, 2019
3	10		June 21, 2020	August 23, 2020
4	10		November 7, 2021	January 2, 2022
5	14	8	November 13, 2022	January 1, 2023
5	14	6	November 10, 2024	December 15, 2024

== Production ==
=== Development ===
In 2013, having grown tired of acting, Taylor Sheridan began work on the series and writing screenplays. Having lived in the rural parts of states such as Texas and Wyoming, he set the series in Montana and went about writing the first scripts in Livingston. Taylor Sheridan originally wrote Yellowstone as a film, pitching it as "The Godfather in Montana". He initially pitched the series to HBO, but the network declined.

In May 2017, Paramount Network announced that it had greenlit its first scripted series, Yellowstone. Paramount issued a series order for a first season consisting of ten episodes. The series was set to be written, directed, and executive-produced by Taylor Sheridan. Other executive producers were to include John Linson, Art Linson, Harvey Weinstein, and David C. Glasser. Production companies involved with the series were set to consist of Linson Entertainment and The Weinstein Company.

In October 2017, it was announced that following reports of sexual abuse allegations against producer Harvey Weinstein, his name would be removed from the series' credits as would The Weinstein Company. In January 2018, Kevin Kay, president of Paramount Network, clarified during the annual Television Critics Association's winter press tour that Yellowstone will not have The Weinstein Company's credits or logo on them, even though that company was involved in production. He stated that their intent is to replace Weinstein Television with the company's new name in the show's credits when available. That same day, it was announced that the series would premiere on June 20, 2018.

In July 2018, it was announced that Paramount Network had renewed the series for a second season that was expected to premiere in 2019. In March 2019, it was announced that the second season would premiere on June 19, 2019. In June 2019, the series was renewed by Paramount for a third season, which premiered on June 21, 2020. In February 2020, Paramount Network renewed the series for a fourth season, ahead of the premiere of its third season. The fourth season premiered on November 7, 2021. In February 2022, Paramount Network renewed the series for a fifth season, which was split into two installments. The fifth season premiered on November 13, 2022. In May 2023, Paramount announced that Costner would be leaving the series at the end of Part 1 of Season 5. The second part of the fifth and final season premiered on November 10, 2024.

=== Casting ===
The show was cast by John Papsidera. In May 2017, it was announced that Kevin Costner had been cast in the series lead role of John Dutton. In June 2017, he initially agreed to one season and eventually decided to stay on for three. it was reported that Luke Grimes, Cole Hauser, Wes Bentley, and Kelly Reilly had joined the main cast. In July 2017, it was announced that Kelsey Asbille had been cast in a main role. In August 2017, it was reported that Dave Annable, Gil Birmingham, and Jefferson White had been added to the main cast while Wendy Moniz, Gretchen Mol, Jill Hennessy, Patrick St. Esprit, Ian Bohen, Denim Richards, and Golden Brooks were joining the cast in a recurring capacity.

In November 2017, it was announced that Michaela Conlin and Josh Lucas had been added to the cast in recurring roles. In December 2017, it was reported that Heather Hemmens was joining the cast in a recurring capacity. In June 2018, it was announced that Barret Swatek had been cast in a recurring role. In September 2018, it was announced that Neal McDonough was joining the cast of season two in a recurring capacity. In July 2021, it was announced that Jacki Weaver, Piper Perabo, Kathryn Kelly and Finn Little were joining the cast in the fourth season. In February 2022, it was announced alongside the fifth season renewal that Jennifer Landon and Kelly were promoted to series regulars for the season.

=== Costume designer ===
In August 2017, Oscar-nominated costume designer Ruth E. Carter joined the production team, but soon departed at the end of the first season. Designer Johnetta Boone then joined the production crew for the start of the second season.

=== Filming ===
Principal photography for the series began in August 2017 at the Chief Joseph Ranch near Darby, Montana, which stands in as the home of John Dutton. Filming also took place that month near Park City, Utah. The production used all three soundstages at the Utah Film Studios in Park City, which is a total of 45,000 square feet. The building also houses offices, editing, a wardrobe department and construction shops. By November 2017, the series had filmed in more than twenty locations in Utah, including the Salt Flats, Promontory Club, and Spanish Fork. Additionally, filming also took place at various locations in Montana. Production reportedly lasted until December 2017.

In August 2020, the series announced that filming was completely moved to Montana. An undisclosed production location was rented in Missoula, Montana. Film locations included the Community Medical Center, Ryman Street near the County Courthouse, and a diner (Ruby's Cafe) on Brooks Street in Missoula, as well as places in nearby Hamilton, Montana.

Filming for season 5 started in June 2022 in Missoula. In May 2023, filming Season 5 Part 2 was delayed due to the Writers Guild of America strike, due to pick back up in April 2024.

==== John Dutton's "Log Mansion" ====
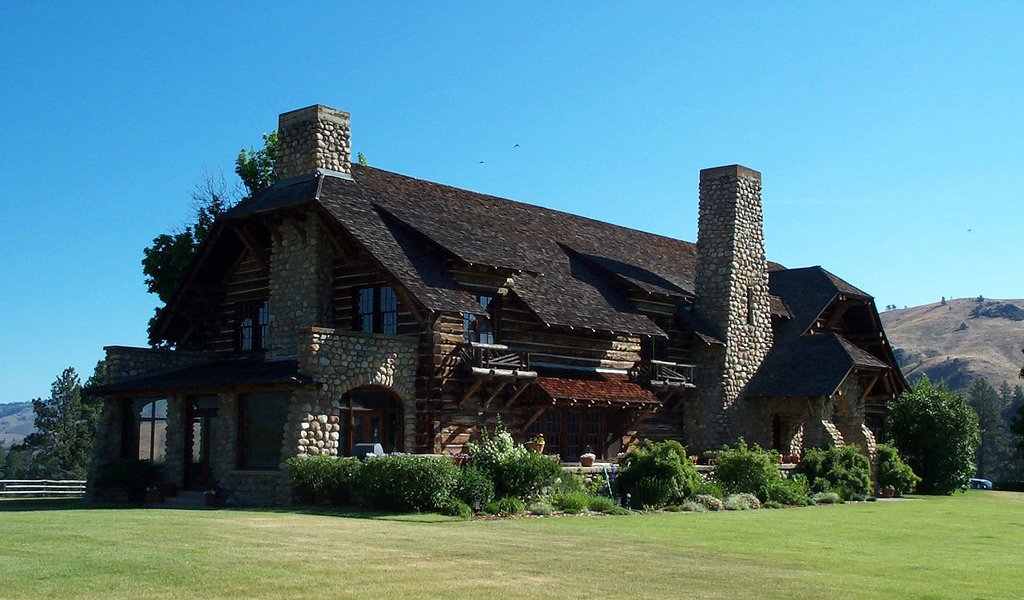
Chief Joseph Ranch near Darby, Montana.

Filming of the "log mansion" home of John Dutton is at the main house of the Chief Joseph Ranch, which is now a guest ranch just south of Darby.

The house was built between 1914 and 1917 after Cincinnati, Ohio, residents William S. Ford (1866–1935) and Howard Clark Hollister (1856–1919) purchased 2,500 acres on the Bitterroot River for a vacation home and formed the Ford-Hollister Ranch. Ford was chairman of Owens-Illinois Glass in Toledo, Ohio. Hollister was a judge for the United States District Court for the Southern District of Ohio. Bates & Gamble of Toledo were the architects. The house is 5,000 square feet including a 2,200 square foot parlor.

The house has a log cabin motif and was dubbed "log mansion" by The New York Times. It has been compared in style to the Old Faithful Inn which opened in 1904 and is 294 driving miles away in Yellowstone National Park. The Times described it as "A diverse combination of arches, gables and dormers, set off by logs placed vertically and horizontally, adds an elegance to log-home design that is seldom seen."

The complex includes three large barns built to house Holstein cattle. It was claimed it was the largest dairy herd west of the Mississippi River. Ford later gave up the dairy cattle and began raising Hereford cattle. After Ford died, his wife and daughter operated it as a guest house. They sold it in 1952. It went through a series of new owners who renamed it for Chief Joseph who is said to have passed through its area during the Nez Perce War. Mel Pervais, a member of the Ojibwa Nation, owned it from 1987 to 2004.

=== Music ===
The series' score was composed by Brian Tyler. Tyler worked with musicians from the London Philharmonia Orchestra and viola, cello, and violin soloists. On August 17, 2018, the soundtrack for the first season was released by Sony Music. Later on, Breton Vivian who composed additional music in season 1 & 2, has joined with Brian Tyler to score music for season three to five. Lakeshore Records has released the season 2 through the season 5 soundtracks.

== Release ==
A teaser trailer for the series was released on February 28, 2018, with the first full trailer being released on April 26. On June 25, 2018, the series held a screening at Seriesfest, an annual international television festival, at the Red Rocks Amphitheater near Denver, Colorado. The first season was released on Blu-ray and DVD on December 4, 2018, by Paramount Home Media Distribution (under the Paramount Network label). After their Paramount Network premieres, CMT began reairing the fifth season on Fridays. On July 17, 2023, following the SAG-AFTRA strike, CBS announced that edited episodes of the series would air on its Fall 2023 schedule.

=== Streaming ===
NBCUniversal's Peacock acquired the American streaming rights to Yellowstone in 2020, with the first two seasons debuting in July of that year. Paramount Global President and CEO Bob Bakish has since called the timing of the deal "unfortunate", due to the show's improved reception, viewership, and popularity in its later seasons. Critics have noted that Yellowstone's absence from Paramount's own, similarly named streaming service, Paramount+ (in-spite of the show's spin-offs being produced for the service), in addition to current seasons previously being available on Paramount Network's app and website primarily through TV Everywhere (requiring a paid television subscription), have caused confusion among viewers and the show's fans on social media.

Full episodes and seasons of Yellowstone are available for purchase on all major digital entertainment distribution stores in the United States, with Amazon's Prime Video streaming new episodes in Canada the day after their American broadcast on Paramount Network. Starting with the fifth season, it will be moved to Paramount+ in Canada, and the UK, and to SkyShowtime in any territories where the service is already available. As with the previous seasons in Canada, new episodes will be released the day after the American airing.

== Reception ==
=== Audience viewership ===
Viewership of the series grew with subsequent seasons. The season 3 premiere attracted 7.6 million viewers, and the season 4 premiere tallied 12.7 million viewers. The season 5 premiere garnered 12.1 million viewers. The show has been called a "Heartland drama" and "red state" drama, a label which Taylor Sheridan himself disputes.

=== Critical response ===
Following its premiere, the show was met with a mixed response from critics. Metacritic, which uses a weighted average, assigned the first season a score of 54 out of 100 based on 27 critics, indicating "mixed or average reviews". On the review aggregation website Rotten Tomatoes, the first season holds a 56% approval rating, with an average rating of 5.8/10 based on 52 reviews. The website's critical consensus of the first season reads, "Yellowstone proves too melodramatic to be taken seriously, diminishing the effects of the talented cast and beautiful backdrops."

The second season holds an approval rating of 89%, based on 9 reviews. The third season holds an approval rating of 100% based on reviews from 7 critics. The fourth season holds a 91% approval rating based on reviews from 11 critics. The critical consensus for that season reads, "Hitting its stride as a predictably unpredictable oat opera, Yellowstone continues to entertain with its tough-as-rawhide characters and modernized perspective on classic cowboy tropes." The fifth season earned a 79% approval rating based on 62 reviews. The critical consensus for that season reads, "Galloping into the arena of politics with a decidedly nonpartisan bent, Yellowstone enters uncertain territory but remains firmly in the saddle, with Kevin Costner's steadfast presence remaining an invaluable asset."

=== Native American representation ===
Native American actor Lily Gladstone described the series' portrayal of Native Americans as "delusional" and "deplorable" in an interview with Vulture. She added, "No offense to the Native talent in that. I auditioned several times. That's what we had." Associate professor of history, Liza Black, criticized the series and wrote that "Yellowstone's subtext is another thing entirely: the settler-colonial version of American history, which offers didactics on human nature rather than confronting the history of Native peoples". Black adds that "Sheridan erases the history between Natives and settlers, turning Montana into a place of brute force with no national past". She was also critical of the series' depiction of Native American women in particular, noting that "Yellowstone takes the historical reality and distorts it to make white women the victims."

=== Accolades ===
Year	Award	Category	Nominee(s)	Result	Ref.
2019	American Society of Cinematographers Awards	Outstanding Achievement in Cinematography in Regular Series for Commercial Television	Ben Richardson (for "Daybreak")	Nominated	
2019	Hollywood Post Alliance Awards	Outstanding Sound – Television	Alan Robert Murray, Tim LeBlanc, and Dean A. Zupancic (for "Daybreak")	Nominated	
2019	Hollywood Post Alliance Awards	Outstanding Sound – Television	Alan Robert Murray, Tim LeBlanc, and Dean A. Zupancic (for "Kill the Messenger")	Nominated	
2021	Hollywood Critics Association Awards	Best Supporting Actress in a Broadcast Network or Cable Series, Drama	Kelly Reilly	Nominated	
2021	Location Managers Guild Awards	Outstanding Locations in Contemporary Television	Charlie Skinner and David Zachary Hein	Nominated	
2021	Primetime Creative Arts Emmy Awards	Outstanding Production Design for a Narrative Contemporary Program (One Hour or More)	Cary White, Yvonne Boudreaux, and Carla Curry (for "Going Back to Cali")	Nominated	
2022	AARP Movies for Grownups Awards	Best Actor – Television	Kevin Costner	Nominated	
2022	Art Directors Guild Awards	Excellence in Production Design for a One-Hour Contemporary Single-Camera Series	Cary White (for "No Kindness for the Coward")	Nominated	
2022	Cinema Audio Society Awards	Outstanding Achievement in Sound Mixing for Television Series – One Hour	Andrejs Prokopenko, Diego Gat, Samuel Ejnes, Michael Miller, and Chris Navarro (for "Half the Money")	Won	
2022	Hollywood Critics Association TV Awards	Best Actor in a Broadcast Network or Cable Series, Drama	Kevin Costner	Nominated	
2022	Hollywood Critics Association TV Awards	Best Actress in a Broadcast Network or Cable Series, Drama	Kelly Reilly	Nominated	
2022	Hollywood Critics Association TV Awards	Best Directing in a Broadcast Network or Cable Series, Drama	Taylor Sheridan (for "Keep the Wolves Close")	Nominated	
2022	Hollywood Critics Association TV Awards	Best Writing in a Broadcast Network or Cable Series, Drama	Taylor Sheridan (for "Half the Money")	Nominated	
2022	MTV Movie & TV Awards	Best Show	Yellowstone	Nominated	
2022	MTV Movie & TV Awards	Best Performance in a Show	Kelly Reilly	Nominated	
2022	Producers Guild of America Awards	Outstanding Producer of Episodic Television – Drama	Yellowstone	Nominated	
2022	Screen Actors Guild Awards	Outstanding Performance by an Ensemble in a Drama Series	Kelsey Asbille, Wes Bentley, Ryan Bingham, Gil Birmingham, Ian Bohen, Eden Brolin, Kevin Costner, Hugh Dillon, Luke Grimes, Hassie Harrison, Cole Hauser, Jennifer Landon, Finn Little, Brecken Merrill, Will Patton, Piper Perabo, Kelly Reilly, Denim Richards, Taylor Sheridan, Forrie J. Smith, and Jefferson White	Nominated	
2022	Set Decorators Society of America Awards	Best Achievement in Décor/Design of a One Hour Contemporary Series	Carla Curry and Cary White	Nominated	
2023	Critics' Choice Television Awards	Best Drama Series	Yellowstone	Nominated	
2023	Critics' Choice Television Awards	Best Actress in a Drama Series	Kelly Reilly	Nominated	
2023	Golden Globe Awards	Best Performance by an Actor in a Television Series – Drama	Kevin Costner	Won	
2025	Cinema Audio Society Awards	Outstanding Achievement in Sound Mixing for Television Series – One Hour	Andrejs Prokopenko, Brad Zoern, Josh Sieh, David S. DiPietro (for "Life is a Promise")	Nominated	

== Franchise ==
Yellowstone has spawned an extensive extended franchise consisting of prequels, sequels, and spin-offs. The first two prequels, 1883 and 1923 take place in the titular years after which the series are named; the former explores how the Duttons originally traveled to Montana, while the latter focuses on a generation of the family during western expansion. 1883 spanned ten episodes and released on Paramount+ from December 19, 2021, to February 27, 2022 It was initially announced that 1883 itself would spin-off into another series titled 1883: The Bass Reeves Story. This was however, later reworked into a standalone program and retitled Lawmen: Bass Reeves. 1923 spanned two seasons of eight episodes each, and was also released on Paramount+ between December 18, 2022, and April 6, 2025. Taylor Sheridan has also been working on two further prequels set in the 1940s and 1960s. Following the conclusion of 1923, 1944 was reported to be in active development.

Following the planned departure of Costner from Yellowstone a spin-off series with the working title 2024 was announced as being in development. This series was later retitled The Madison, however it was later confirmed as a stand-alone series no longer set in the Yellowstone universe. Luke Grimes as well as Kelly Reilly and Cole Hauser signed on to lead separate sequels centered around their characters. Grimes' was ordered to series as Y: Marshals, later retitled Marshals, and premiered on CBS in March 2026. It focuses on Kayce becoming a U.S. Marshal with Gil Birmingham, Mo Brings Plenty, and Brecken Merrill also reprising their roles. Reilly and Hauser star in Dutton Ranch, along with Finn Little reprising his role, which premiered on Paramount+ in May 2026. In February 2021, the spin-off series 6666, set in Texas on the Four Sixes Ranch, was announced as being in development, with the ranch's appearances in seasons 4 and 5 acting as groundwork for the proposed spin-off. However, Taylor Sheridan later confirmed in an interview that the series was not moving forward, stating that he did not wish to create a show based on a fictional version of the ranch.
