= Forrie J. Smith =

American actor and stuntman

- Born: 1958 or 1959 (age 66–67)
- Occupations: Actor, stuntman

Forrie J. Smith (born 1958/1959) is an American actor and stuntman. He is best known for playing Lloyd Pierce, a ranch hand in the American western drama television series Yellowstone.

== Life and career ==
Smith was raised on a ranch in Helena, Montana. His father is in the Canadian Cowboy Hall of Fame and his mother was a barrel racer. He competed in rodeo at Montana State University. He began his screen career in 1987, appearing in the television film Desperado. In 1988, he performed stunts in the film Rambo III, and in 1994, he performed stunts in the film Lightning Jack.

Later in his career, from 2018 to 2024, Smith starred as Lloyd Pierce, a ranch hand in the Paramount Network western drama television series Yellowstone, starring along with Kevin Costner, Luke Grimes, Kelly Reilly, Wes Bentley, Cole Hauser and Kelsey Asbille. He guest-starred in television programs including Better Call Saul, Legend, The Young Riders, The Lazarus Man and Midnight, Texas, and played the recurring role of Pete in the Canale 5 western television series Lucky Luke. He also appeared in films such as Tombstone (as Pony Deal), Troublemakers, South of Heaven, West of Hell, Transamerica, Gunslingers and By His Hand.
