= Tribal police =

Tribal police can mean any of the following:

- Arbaki of Afghanistan
- Australian native police
- District Reserve Guard and Salwa Judum of India
- Dubas of the Northern Frontier District of Kenya
- Flechas of Portuguese Africa
- Indian tribal police of the United States
- Indigenous police in Canada
- Khasadars of Pakistan
- Senoi Praaq of Malaysia
- Village guard system of Turkey
