= Art Linson =

American film director

- Born: Chicago, Illinois, U.S.
- Occupations: Film producer, screenwriter
- Spouse: Fiona Lewis

Art Linson is an American producer, screenwriter, and author.

== Life and career ==
Art Linson has produced movies in every decade since the seventies including Fight Club, Heat, The Untouchables, Fast Times at Ridgemont High, Into the Wild, and Melvin and Howard.

Linson was an executive producer on the long-running FX television series Sons of Anarchy (2008–2014), as well as Yellowstone, starring Kevin Costner. Yellowstone premiered on June 20, 2018, on the Paramount Network. Yellowstone has become the most popular scripted series in television. Linson is also an executive producer on the TV series 1883 and 1923.

He is the author of two books, A Pound of Flesh: Perilous Tales of How to Produce Movies in Hollywood (1998) and What Just Happened?: Bitter Hollywood Tales from the Front Line, the last of which was made into a major motion picture starring Robert De Niro and directed by Barry Levinson.

Linson is married to British actress and writer Fiona Lewis.

== Filmography ==
He was a producer in all films unless otherwise noted.

=== Film ===
Year	Film	Credit	Notes	Ref.
1975	Rafferty and the Gold Dust Twins			
1976	Car Wash			
1978	American Hot Wax			
1980	Where the Buffalo Roam	Director		
1980	Melvin and Howard			
1982	Fast Times at Ridgemont High			
1984	The Wild Life	Director		
1987	The Untouchables			
1988	Scrooged			
1989	Casualties of War			
1989	We're No Angels			
1990	Dick Tracy	Executive producer		
1992	Singles	Executive producer		
1993	Point of No Return			
1993	This Boy's Life			
1995	Heat			
1997	The Edge			
1998	Great Expectations			
1999	Pushing Tin			
1999	Fight Club			
2000	Sunset Strip			
2001	Heist			
2004	Spartan			
2004	Imaginary Heroes			
2005	Lords of Dogtown	Executive producer		
2006	The Black Dahlia			
2007	Into the Wild			
2008	What Just Happened			
2010	The Runaways			
2016	The Comedian			
2018	The Outsider			
—N/a	Arrive Alive			

As writer

Year	Film
1978	American Hot Wax
2008	What Just Happened
2016	The Comedian

As director

Year	Film
1980	Where the Buffalo Roam
1984	The Wild Life

Thanks

Year	Film	Role
1995	The Crossing Guard	Special thanks

=== Television ===
Year	Film	Credit	Notes
1993	The Untouchables	Executive producer	
2012	Outlaw Country	Executive producer	Television film
2008−14	Sons of Anarchy	Executive producer	
2014	The Money	Executive producer	Television film
2018−	Yellowstone	Executive producer	
2022	1883: The Road West	Executive producer	Television special
2021−22	1883	Executive producer	
2022−	1923	Executive producer	
TBA	6666	Executive producer	
