= FYC =

FYC may refer to:

- Fanny Cory (1877–1972), American illustrator and comic artist
- Fine Young Cannibals, a band from Birmingham, England
- Fine Young Capitalists, a video game design company
- First-year composition
- For Your Consideration (advertising)

== See also ==
- For Your Consideration (disambiguation)
