= Consideration (disambiguation) =

Consideration is a concept of English common law.

Consideration may also refer to:

- "Consideration", a track from the album Anti by Rihanna
- Consideration in English law
- Consideration under American law
- Consideration by paragraph, British parliamentary procedure

== See also ==
- Consider (disambiguation)
- For Your Consideration (disambiguation)
- Rationality
