= 1923 season 2 =

Season of American western drama

1923
- Season 2
- DVD cover art
- Showrunner: Taylor Sheridan
- Starring: Helen Mirren; Harrison Ford; Brandon Sklenar; Julia Schlaepfer; Jerome Flynn; Darren Mann; Isabel May; Brian Geraghty; Aminah Nieves; Michelle Randolph; Timothy Dalton
- No. of episodes: 8

Release
- Original network: Paramount+
- Original release: February 23 – April 6, 2025

Season chronology
- ← Previous; Season 1

The second and final season of the American neo-Western and period drama television series 1923 was announced in February 2023. As a limited-run series, the program was not originally intended to extend beyond its initial eight-episode order. Season two was developed after its creator and showrunner, Taylor Sheridan, determined that the story needed more episodes to reach a proper conclusion. The series is a part of the Yellowstone franchise, and is a sequel to 1883 and a prequel to Yellowstone. 1923 stars Helen Mirren, Harrison Ford, Brandon Sklenar, Julia Schlaepfer, Jerome Flynn, Darren Mann, Isabel May, Brian Geraghty, Amina Nieves, Michelle Randolph, and Timothy Dalton.

Sheridan wrote all eight of the season's episodes. The series revolves around a generation of the Dutton family, and is set in the U.S. state of Montana in 1923 and 1924. The Duttons face the struggles of winter and attempt to protect their ranch against those who wish to develop and profit from the land. Other storylines revolve around a newlywed couple who have been separated and are attempting to reunite, and a fugitive Native American schoolgirl who is being sought in Oklahoma and Texas. Some arcs include fictionalized versions of real people and events.

Similar to the first season, the production team planned on filming most of the season in Butte, Montana, beginning in June 2023, but delays caused by the 2023 Hollywood labor disputes led to the moving of principal photography to Austin, Texas, and the surrounding areas, although some location filming took place in Montana. Recording began on July 8, 2024, and concluded in November; the show's cast and crew experienced difficulties with extreme weather in both regions. The second season received a budget of $22 million per episode; Ben Richardson directed all eight episodes, and Brian Tyler and Breton Vivian composed the score.

The season was released on the streaming platform Paramount+ from February 23 to April 6, 2025. Two soundtrack albums were released; the first on the day the season began and the second on the day it concluded, and home video sets were published in August. It received mostly positive reviews, particularly for its technical aspects such as acting, writing, costuming, cinematography, and political subtext; however, some commentators criticized the show's large cast, melodramatic feel, and a sadistic storyline featuring two sex workers. Season two was noted for its positive economic impact in Montana and Texas. It also set viewership records. The season received several accolades and award nominations, most notably for its locations, production design, and costumes, while media outlets pointed out its lack of Emmy Award nominations.

== Cast and characters ==
=== Main ===
- Helen Mirren as Cara Dutton
- Harrison Ford as Jacob Dutton
- Brandon Sklenar as Spencer Dutton
- Julia Schlaepfer as Alexandra Dutton
- Jerome Flynn as Banner Creighton
- Darren Mann as Jack Dutton
- Isabel May as Elsa Dutton
- Brian Geraghty as Zane Davis
- Aminah Nieves as Teonna Rainwater
- Michelle Randolph as Elizabeth "Liz" Strafford
- Timothy Dalton as Donald Whitfield

=== Recurring ===
- Robert Patrick as Sheriff William McDowell
- Sebastian Roché as Father Jacques Renaud
- Madison Elise Rogers as Lindy
- Caleb Martin as Dennis
- Brian Konowal as Clyde
- Michael Spears as Runs His Horse
- Jamie McShane as Marshal Nathan Kent
- Jeremy Gauna as Pete Plenty Clouds
- Joy Osmanski as Alice Davis
- Jennifer Carpenter as Marshal Mamie Fossett

=== Guest ===
- Jo Ellen Pellman as Jennifer
- Mark Daneri as Dr. Steven Miller
- Colt Brown as Alec
- Sarah Randall Hunt as Ellie Creighton
- Ross Crain as Marshal Thomas
- Cailyn Rice as Christy
- Patrick Burch as Roy Garrett
- Andy Dispensa as Luca Maceo
- Gilles Marini as Salvatore "Sal" Maceo
- C. Thomas Howell as Anders
- Dougie Hall as Two Spears
- Brian Letscher as Dr. Shilling
- Mike Mizwicki as Walter Ridding
- Damien Leake as Marvin
- James Healy Jr. as Sheriff Hastings
- Hayley McFarland as Mary
- Janet Montgomery as Hillary
- Augustus Prew as Paul
- Chad Doreck as Bernard Anthony
- Virginia Gardner as Mabel
- Damon Carney as Dr. Andrew Henderson
- Steve Brudniak as Judge Reading

== Episodes ==
List of 1923 season 2 episodes
No. overall	No. in season	Title	Directed by	Written by	Original release date
9	1	"The Killing Season"	Ben Richardson	Taylor Sheridan	February 23, 2025
As winter continues, the Dutton ranch faces financial hardship, forcing the family to sell their remaining herd. Before heading to Bozeman, Jacob scares off a cougar on their porch. He visits a speakeasy, where McDowell informs him that Zane and Alice remain separated and in jail for miscegenation. Still recovering from her miscarriage, Elizabeth heads outside, but is confronted by the cougar, which Cara shoots dead. Having earned passage on a steamship bound for America, Spencer works alongside Luca, a young Italian man. Spencer intervenes when another crew member rapes Luca and the ship's captain then executes the rapist. Spencer later talks Luca down after he prepares to kill himself, and they work together to arrange fights between Spencer and other crewmates, earning both of them money. Having returned to England, Alexandra remains heartbroken at being separated from Spencer. Alexandra reveals her pregnancy to Jennifer, who helps her buy a third-class ticket to America. Renaud and Kent continue hunting Teonna after she escapes from her boarding school. Kent grows impatient and kills several Comanche villagers. Still on the run, Teonna asks Runs His Horse for permission to marry Pete, with whom she later gets intimate, until a cowboy discovers them and reveals they are in Texas.
10	2	"The Rapist Is Winter"	Ben Richardson	Taylor Sheridan	March 2, 2025
Jacob blackmails a judge to secures the release of Zane and his family. He visits Zane, but finds he can barely walk after having been severely beaten in jail. On their journey back to the ranch, they are trapped in a blizzard and take shelter under their wagon. Elizabeth discovers that a hungry and likely rabid wolf has slaughtered the ranch's chickens; the wolf bites her, and she is later forced to take a rabies vaccine. At night, the wolf breaks into the house and tries to attack Cara, who shoots it. Renaud and Kent continue their search for Teonna in Anadarko, Oklahoma, where the local marshal, Mamie Fossett, helps create illustrations of Teonna for "Wanted" posters. The Comanche retaliate at night; Kent kills them but finds they are children. Spencer arrives in Galveston, Texas, where he meets the leader of a local crime syndicate, Salvatore Maceo. Despite Maceo's warm hospitality toward Spencer for having saved Luca, Spencer attacks Maceo's men after they prevent him from leaving. Maceo later allows Spencer to continue his journey, but forces him to help Luca smuggle illegal whiskey to Fort Worth.
11	3	"Wrap Thee in Terror"	Ben Richardson	Taylor Sheridan	March 9, 2025
Alexandra arrives in New York City and is taken, along with the other third-class passengers, to be processed at Ellis Island. Claiming to be Spencer's wife, Alexandra is forced to go through an invasive medical examination, but despite her pregnancy, she persuades an immigration officer to allow her entry. Locals warn Alexandra of the dangers she may face traveling to Montana alone and, after she reaches the Grand Central Terminal, a man begins stalking her. Runs His Horse meets Anders, a Texan cowboy, and agrees to work for him. Fossett is informed of the dead Comanche children and vows to bring Renaud and Kent to justice. Having survived the blizzard, Jacob and his group return to the ranch, where their doctor informs them that Zane is suffering from a subdural hematoma and that his condition is worsening. Elizabeth plans to leave the ranch for good once she has finished her rabies treatment and asks Jack to join her, but he declines. Spencer and Luca run into a roadblock of lawmen inspecting vehicles for contraband. While Spencer chooses to abandon the illegal whiskey they are transporting, Luca continues on his own and is gunned down by the lawmen.
12	4	"Journey the Rivers of Iron"	Ben Richardson	Taylor Sheridan	March 16, 2025
Whitfield holds a successful meeting for investors, proposing to turn Yellowstone into a tourist resort. He tasks Creighton with taking the Dutton ranch by force and hiding evidence in a legal loophole so he can take ownership of the land. Alexandra is assaulted and robbed, but boards her train in time. Zane is given emergency brain surgery, relieving the pressure on his head and allowing him to walk again, and Jacob promises Zane they will take revenge. Due to the immense pain she feels while taking her rabies vaccines, Elizabeth is discovered to be pregnant. The sheriff of Fort Worth picks up Spencer and demands that Spencer continue delivering the whiskey so he can find the destination. After arriving in Fort Worth, the lawmen raid the bootlegger's warehouse while Spencer flees on foot and escapes onto a train. A group of vagrants later attacks Spencer, but he fends them off before jumping off the train. Runs His Horse, Teonna, and Pete help Anders and his cowboys herd cattle, but they discover the "Wanted" posters and the bounty on Teonna's head.
13	5	"Only Gunshots to Guide Us"	Ben Richardson	Taylor Sheridan	March 23, 2025
Renaud and Kent arrive in Amarillo, Texas, where Anders informs them that Teonna has fled across a long stretch of wide-open plains. Pete separates from Teonna and Runs His Horse to search for water, but finds Renaud and Kent, who chase him until Pete falls from his horse, and they shoot at each other. Fossett finds Spencer and takes him to Amarillo when he reveals he is from Montana. Fossett calls McDowell in Bozeman, who confirms Spencer's identity, but implores that Spencer not return home due to the escalating conflict between the Duttons and Creighton. Still seeking to avenge his brother's death, Spencer ignores McDowell's warning and boards a train bound for Livingston, Montana. Alexandra is forced to work as a waitress on board her train so she can eat. After a passenger sexually assaults Alexandra, she viciously beats him and is locked in a temporary cell. Chicago police arrest Alexandra when the train stops there, but two passengers who witnessed the assault, Hillary and Paul, defend her and she is released. After discovering that Alexandra's connecting train had been canceled, Hillary and Paul invite her to join them.
14	6	"The Mountain Teeth of Monsters"	Ben Richardson	Taylor Sheridan	March 30, 2025
McDowell tells Jacob that Spencer is on his way home, but Jacob fears Whitfield will have Spencer killed to stop him from inheriting the Dutton ranch. Creighton sends men to intercept Spencer at Livingston train station while Jacob arrives first with McDowell. Having reluctantly stayed with Zane to defend the ranch, Jack leaves alone to join Jacob, but two of Creighton's men find and kill him. Having killed Pete in the shootout, Kent loots Pete's body, while Renaud berates him about the morality of all the deaths they have caused. After Kent shows no remorse for his actions, Renaud shoots him dead. Teonna and Runs His Horse later discover Pete's and Kent's corpses and decide to return home. Renaud finds Teonna and Runs His Horse while they sleep; he shoots Runs His Horse, but Teonna fights back and kills him. Alexandra tells Hillary and Paul about the extent of her journey, and they agree to drive her to Montana in their automobile. After traveling hundreds of miles through freezing conditions, Alexandra awakens to discover they have run out of fuel during the night, far from civilization, and that Hillary and Paul have died from hypothermia.
15	7	"A Dream and a Memory"	Ben Richardson	Taylor Sheridan	April 6, 2025
16	8	"A Dream and a Memory"	Ben Richardson	Taylor Sheridan	April 6, 2025
Fossett discovers the aftermath of Teonna's confrontation with Renaud and arrests her following a short standoff. Feeling sympathetic after learning of Teonna's past, Fossett does not charge her for Renaud's or Kent's deaths. Teonna later goes to trial, but her case is dismissed due to a lack of witnesses. With no home or family to return to, Teonna heads to California for a fresh start. Creighton has a personal crisis about working for Whitfield and flees with his family to Livingston train station. Dozens of Creighton's men begin their assault on the Dutton ranch, intending to kill everyone, while Cara and Zane lead the defense. They initially hold off Creighton's men, but the men later return in greater numbers with an automatic firearm. Alexandra stays warm by creating a fire and uses it to signal a passing train. Spencer notices Alexandra from the window and jumps from the train, and they tearfully reunite. Alexandra is taken on board the train and treated for severe frostbite. As the train reaches Livingston, a shootout occurs between Jacob and Creighton's men. When Spencer protects his family, Creighton saves Jacob by shooting his own men, but is killed by McDowell. In his dying moments, Creighton reconciles with Jacob. In the aftermath of the shootout, Jacob and McDowell are wounded. Spencer is forced to leave Alexandra and rushes to the ranch, where he almost single-handedly kills the remainder of Creighton's men. Jacob stays with Alexandra and they are taken to a hospital, where Alexandra prematurely gives birth. Her baby is born three months early and survives, but Alexandra refuses to allow the doctors to amputate her own gangrenous limbs. Spencer and Cara soon arrive, and Alexandra dies hours later in her sleep. Seeking vengeance, Jacob and Spencer confront Whitfield in his mansion. Hoping to make an example of him, Spencer kills Whitfield and sets his home ablaze. Jack's body is soon recovered, and both he and Alexandra are buried on the ranch. With no reason to stay, Elizabeth leaves. Spencer takes charge of the ranch while Jacob retires to help Cara raise Spencer's and Alexandra's son, named John. In a flashforward to 1969, an elderly Spencer visits Alexandra's grave and dies peacefully.

== Production ==
=== Development ===
While writing the first season of 1923, Taylor Sheridan, the creator and showrunner, realized the initial eight-episode order would not allow him to sufficiently conclude the story he had since developed. He contacted executives at Paramount+ and requested they order an additional eight episodes to give himself room to conclude the remaining arcs. Production companies 101 Studios and MTV Entertainment Studios had approved the order by October 2022, while Paramount officially announced the renewal in February 2023. 1923 is a prequel to and spin-off of the Paramount Network series Yellowstone, a sequel to 1883, and part of the Yellowstone franchise. Yellowstone co-creators Sheridan and John Linson, alongside David C. Glasser, Art Linson, Ron Burkle, David Hutkin, Bob Yari, Ben Richardson, Michael Friedman, and Keith Cox, were executive producers of the series. The second season of 1923 cost $22 million per episode, totaling $176 million. Yellowstone actor Mo Brings Plenty worked as the series' Native American affairs coordinator.

=== Casting ===
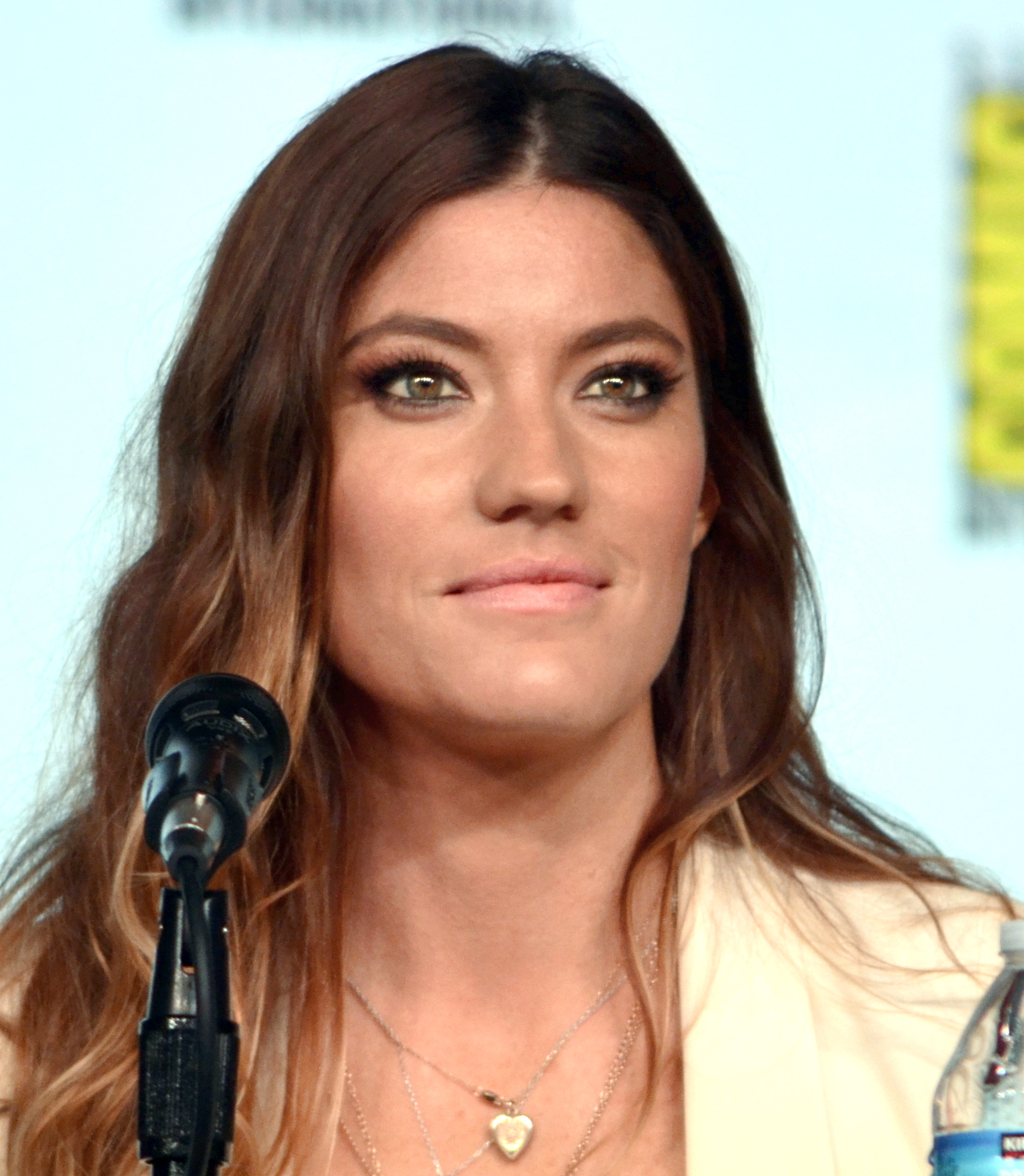
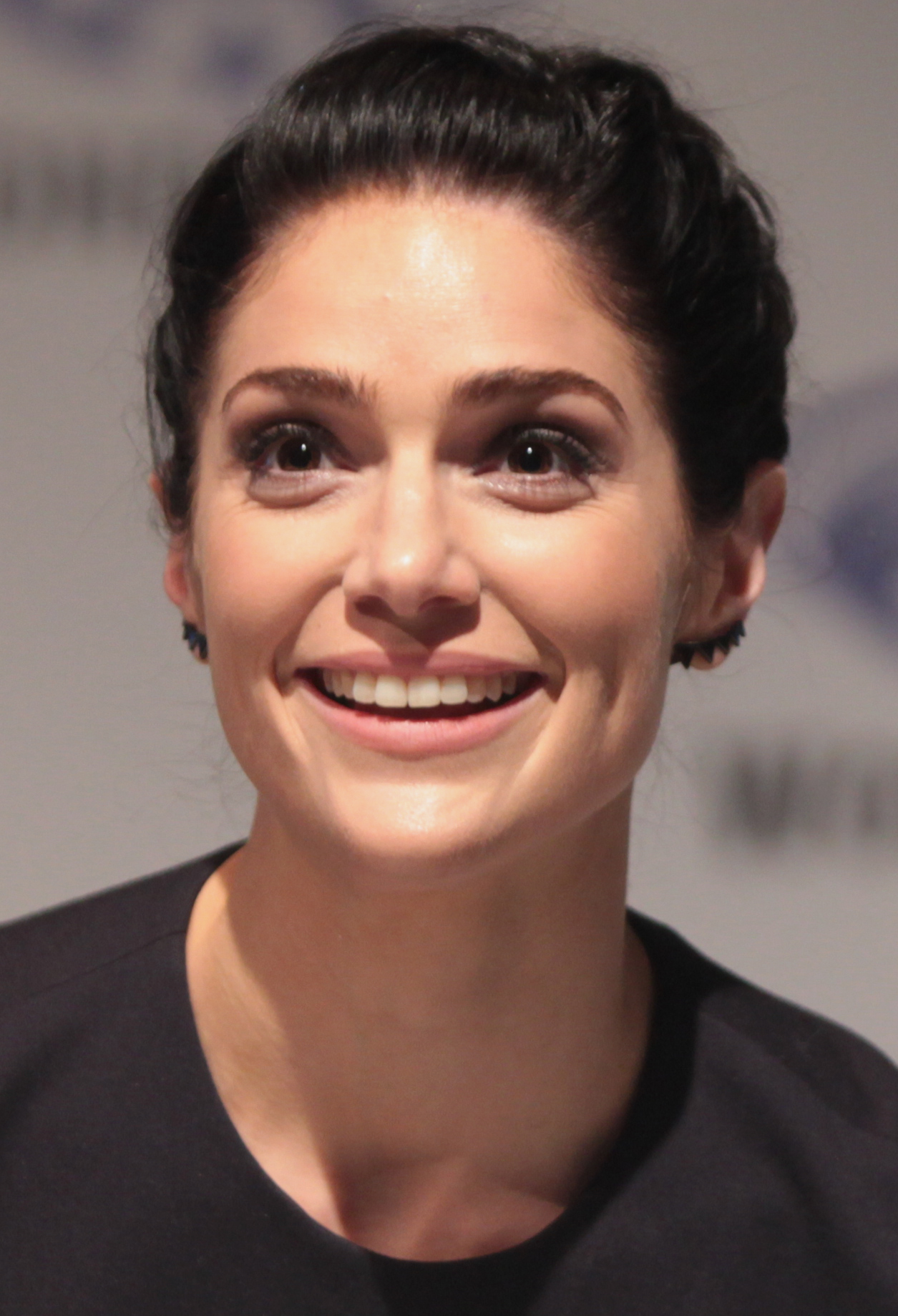
Jennifer Carpenter (left) and Janet Montgomery (right) were cast in the season.

Harrison Ford and Helen Mirren were both initially contracted only for the first season, and by October 2022, negotiations to extend their contracts were underway. Ford and Mirren returned to the show, starring alongside Brandon Sklenar, Julia Schlaepfer, Jerome Flynn, Darren Mann, Brian Geraghty, Aminah Nieves, Michelle Randolph, and Timothy Dalton. Isabel May continued to narrate the show as Elsa Dutton, a character she originated in 1883. Jennifer Carpenter was cast in a recurring role as Deputy U.S. Marshal Mamie Fossett. Carpenter was first contacted about the series through an email that included a seven-page pitch; she sent in a self-recorded audition and was selected to take part in a screen test in Texas. Janet Montgomery, Augustus Prew, and Andy Dispensa joined the cast this season, playing the characters Hillary, Paul, and Luca, respectively. Robert Patrick, Sebastian Roché, Michael Spears, Joy Osmanski, Madison Elise Rogers, and Cailyn Rice also star.

Following the unexpected death of Cole Brings Plenty during the production hiatus, Sheridan decided he needed to recast Pete Plenty Clouds, the character Brings Plenty portrayed. The role was given to Jeremy Gauna, a friend of both Brings Plenty and his uncle, Mo Brings Plenty. Gauna had previously portrayed a Native American warrior in 1883 who handled the death of Elsa in that series. Guana said accepting the role was particularly difficult for himself and other cast and crew members, particularly Nieves, who cried upon seeing him in costume for the first time. However, he felt it was his purpose, believing it would cause people to remember Brings Plenty. In an interview, Nieves stated she initially struggled with grief and resentment during filming, but eventually overcame these feelings. The first episode featured an in memoriam tribute to Brings Plenty.

=== Writing ===
Taylor Sheridan wrote the entire second season of 1923. Although he had not yet planned particular details, he knew how the season would end since he first pitched it. Despite it not being billed or promoted as such, Sheridan considered the entire series to be a single, two-part season. In contrast with season one, in which scripts were written as the show was being recorded, all season two episodes were written prior to the start of filming. The show's second season continues some of the plot threads that were unresolved at the conclusion of the first season. These include the Dutton ranch preparing for a harsh winter and attempts to prevent Whitfield from acquiring the property, battling cattle thieves, and the anticipation of Spencer's return to his Montana home. Spencer and his wife Alexandra are displaced from each other during the season. While Alexandra wants to reunite with Spencer in Montana, she faces migrating as a single, pregnant woman to the United States through Ellis Island, during which she is physically and sexually assaulted.

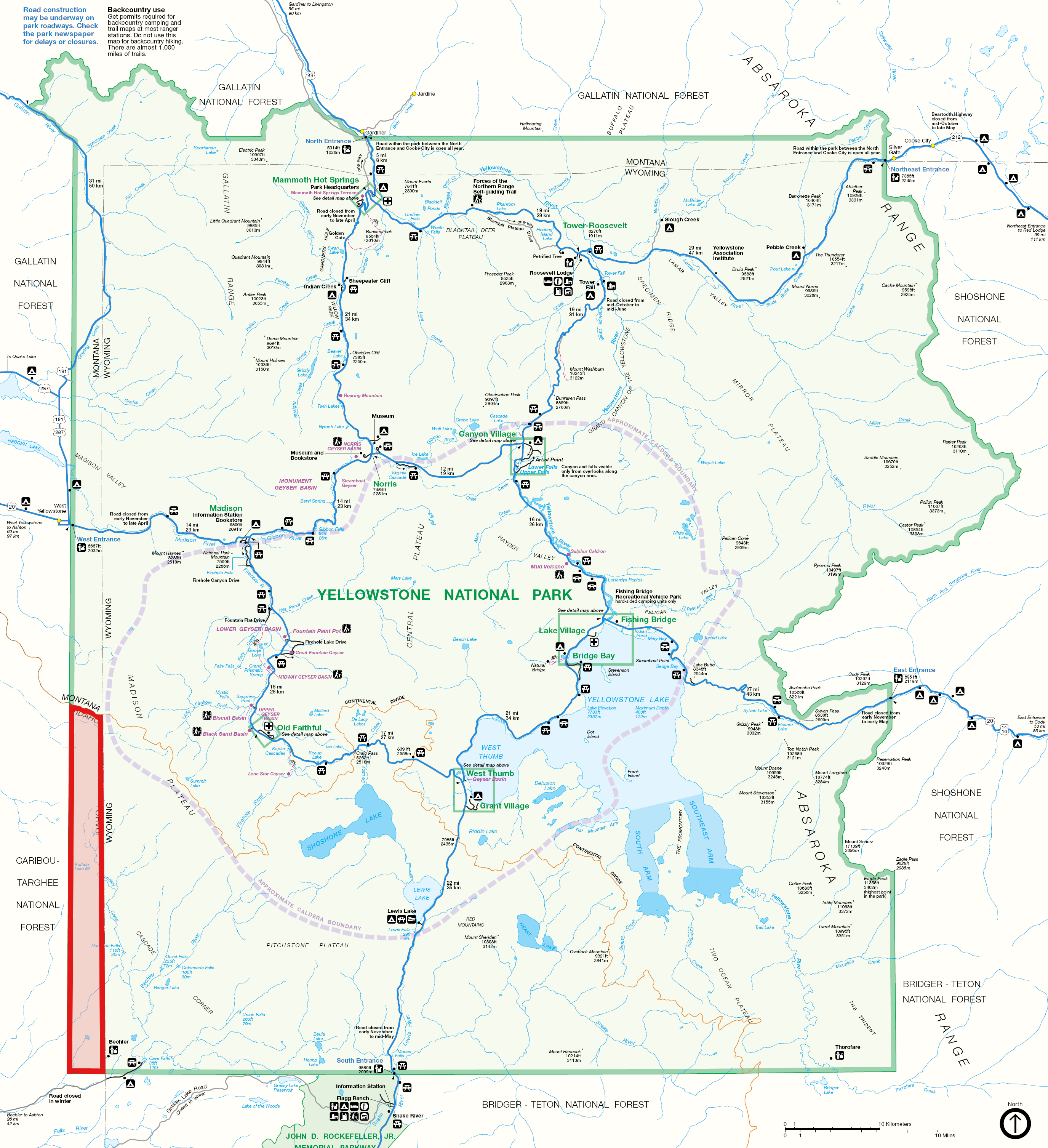
A map of Yellowstone National Park with the Zone of Death highlighted in red.

Whitfield is the season's primary antagonist, who wants to build a ski resort on the ranch. He frequently associates with Creighton, who is tasked with assembling a private militia to take it by force. As a subplot, Dalton's character was written to have a "sadistic punishment fetish". The arc explores his morality and the group power dynamics between him and two sex workers, Christy and Lindy, whom he has been holding hostage. Lindy later becomes his sexual partner. Whitfield provides the origin story for the train station, a frequent location in Yellowstone where major crimes go unpunished because the area is not populated. The location is inspired by the Zone of Death, a portion of Yellowstone National Park in Idaho where enforcement jurisdictions are not clear. Throughout the season, Creighton undergoes a redemption arc and ultimately sacrifices himself to help the Duttons and their ranch. A secondary storyline revolves around Geraghty's character's recovery from injuries he sustained after being arrested for interracial marriage in violation of anti-miscegenation laws.

The story surrounding Nieves' character resumes with her character, Teonna Rainwater, as a fugitive following her escape from an abusive Native American boarding school. This portion of the plot was derived from the historical existence of such schools. During this time, she is pursued by Father Renaud, the school's headmaster, and U.S. Marshal Kent, who functions as antagonists for the arc. Roché described Renaud's continued interest in finding Teonna as an obsession, which he believed resulted from negative admiration. Themes of egoism, extremism, and religion, as well as cultural assimilation of Native Americans and interracial relationships involving Native Americans are also explored in this storyline. The show also continues to explore the development of a romantic relationship between Teonna and Pete. Teonna's arc exists outside of the series' overall premise and does not intersect with the Dutton family.

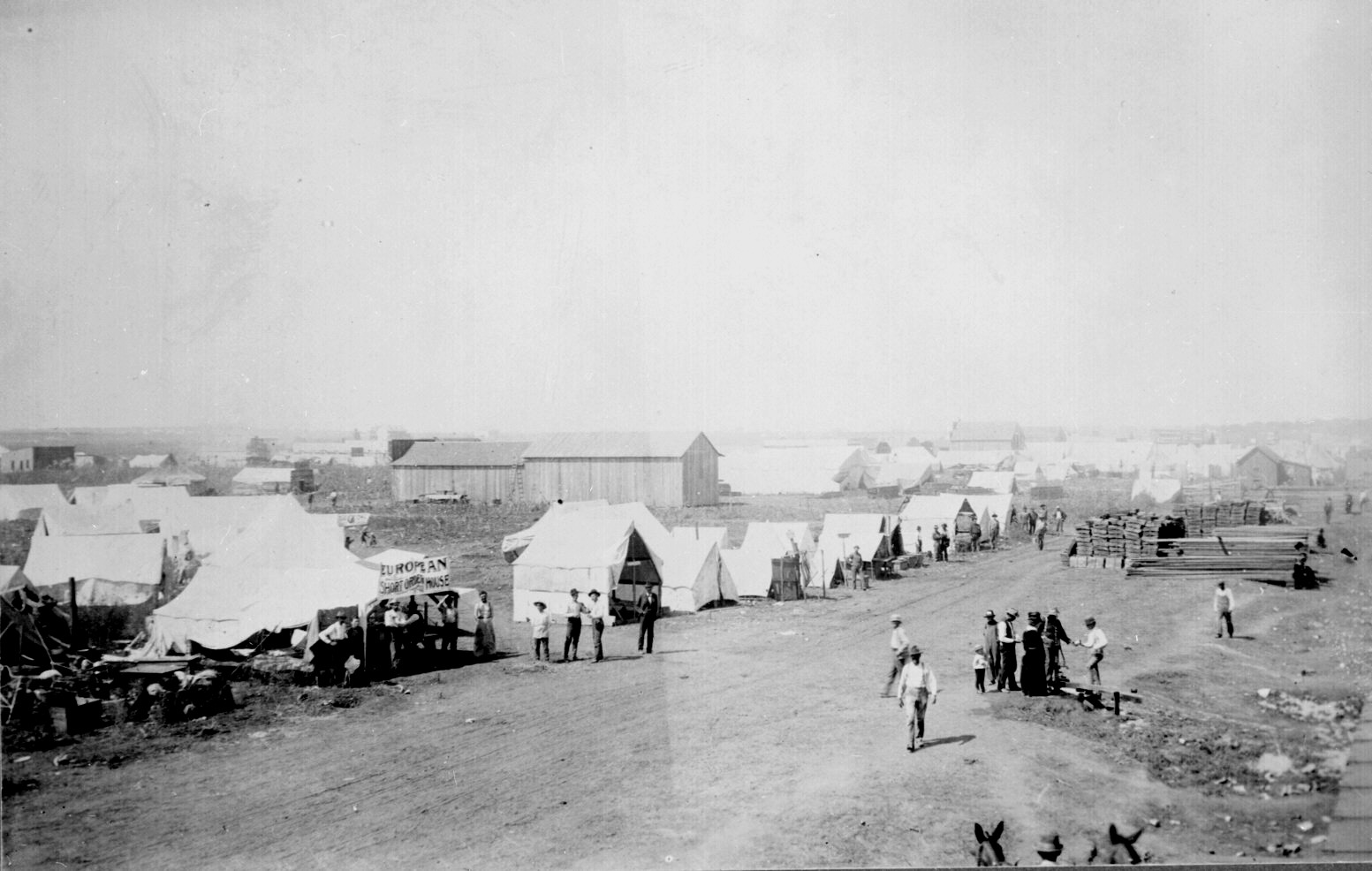
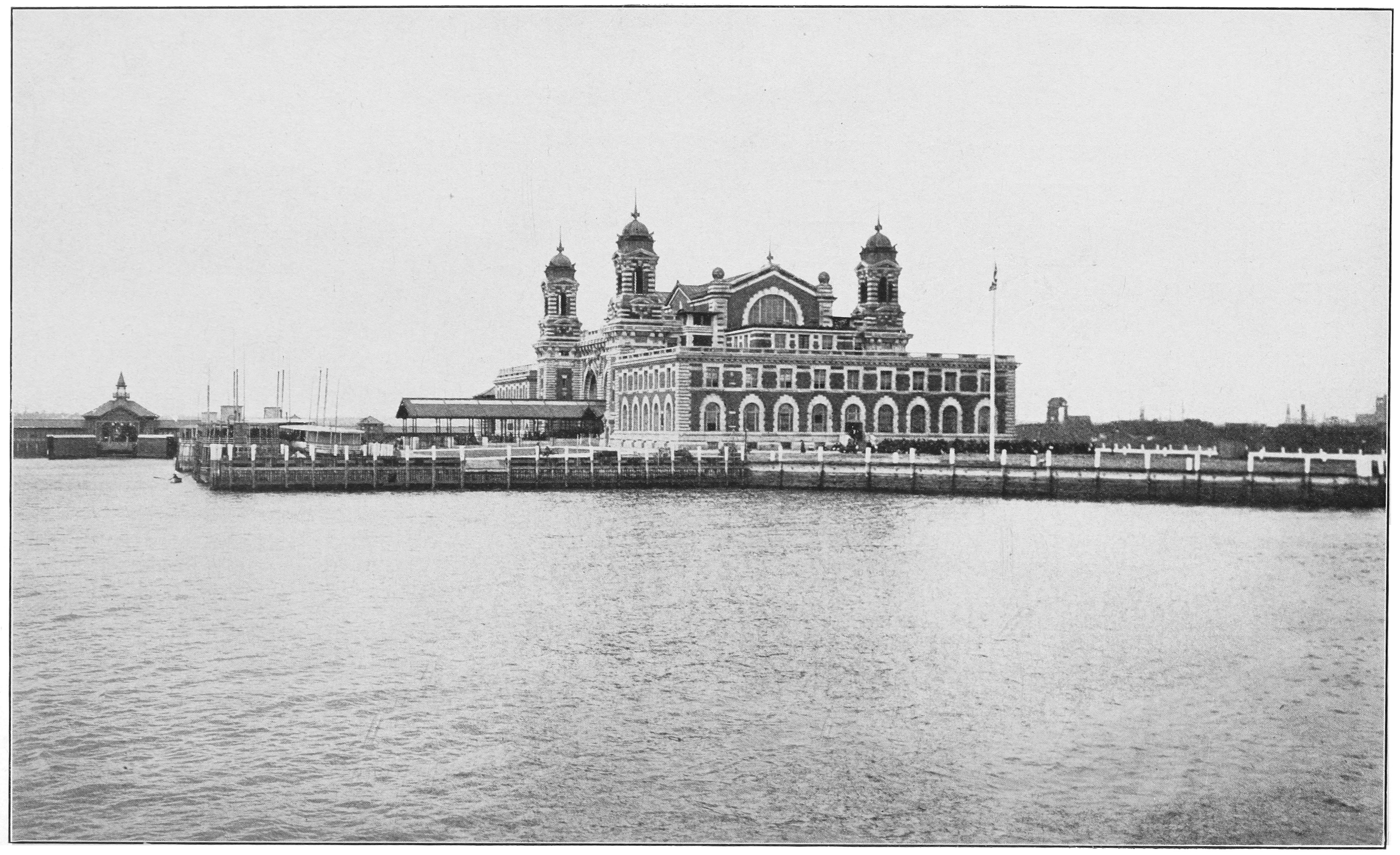
Anadarko, Oklahoma (left, pictured in 1901) and Ellis Island (right, pictured in 1905) were featured as locations during the season.

A fictionalized version of Sal Maceo is featured this season after Spencer returns to the United States. Maceo was a bootlegger during the Roaring Twenties who founded a criminal organization called the Maceo Syndicate and ran an illegal gambling operation known as the Balinese Room, aspects of which were worked into the show. A new character to the plot is Mamie Fossett, a U.S. Marshal based in Anadarko, Oklahoma, who was also partially based on a real person; a marshal of the same name worked in Indian Territory at a time when female law-enforcement officials were uncommon. Carpenter attempted to research Fossett's life, but faced difficulty after finding that little had been written about her. Although Carpenter's character narrative has her primarily interact with Teonna, the fictionalized Fossett briefly meets with Spencer when she questions him as a suspect.

In the season's penultimate episode, Sheridan killed off seven characters, and two key characters die in the finale. Although Renaud ultimately kills Kent, Roché believed the action to be consequentialism rather than having second thoughts. Mann said he felt his character dies because Jack is too naïve. No blocking was written into the script for Randolph's final moments, and she believed the scene properly represents Strafford's character growth across the program. The characters of Schlaepfer and Sklener briefly meet in the finale prior to Alexandra's death. In the series' final scene, however, they reconnect once more, this time in an afterlife. Three new children are also introduced to the Yellowstone franchise in the final episode. This, along with Strafford's departure to Boston, led to speculation between Randolph and Sklener about which of their children would carry the lineage forward into Yellowstone, or how they, and their own characters, could be connected to future franchise series 1944 and The Madison. (Note: When it was announced, The Madison was initially described as a spin-off and contemporary sequel to Yellowstone. It was later revealed to be a stand-alone series set in the Sheridan-verse, an expanded media franchise that includes the Yellowstone franchise within it.) Despite the title of the series, the end of the second season extends into 1924.

=== Production design ===
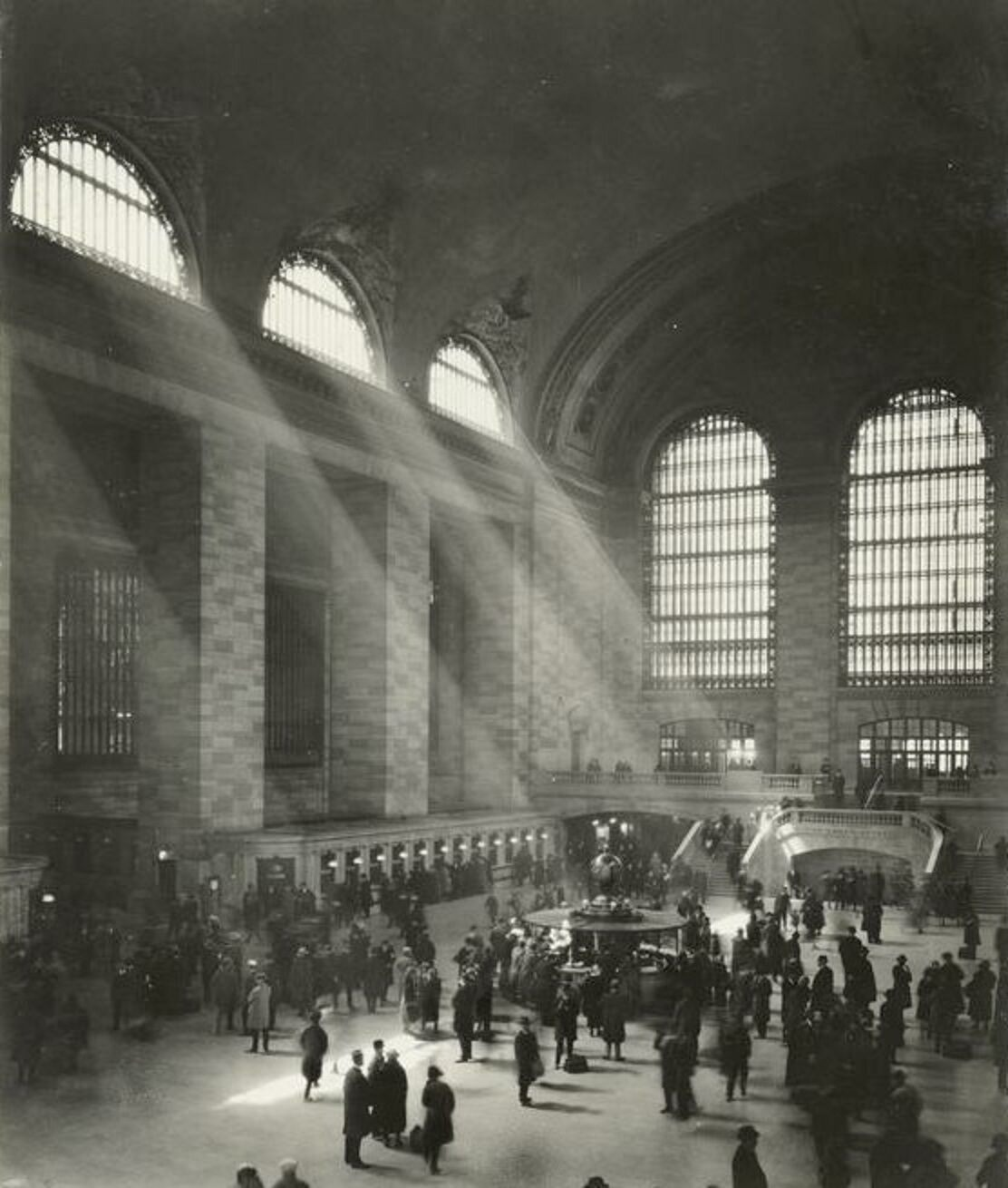
The production team created a period-themed set of Grand Central Station (pictured in 1923).

Soundstages were used in place of outdoor sets for scenes that would have been difficult to film due to weather. One soundstage was constructed to appear as the High Plains near Amarillo, Texas; another featured a period-appropriate set for New York City's Grand Central Station, for which set designers took note to include replicas of the station's lighting fixtures from the 1920s. For exterior scenes in Montana, the production designers created a winter-themed Western. No snowfall occurred during production, except on the last day, so the team used paper snow and display snow as a special effect. Salt was added to ensure the horses had proper traction. The snow that fell quickly melted, forcing them to make sure there were no continuity errors.

Janie Bryant returned to 1923 as the second season's costume designer. Color palettes were discussed with Sheridan before work began, and most of the outfits were assembled in Bryant's tailor shop eight weeks before they were needed. She aimed to dress the characters in tones that corresponded to their emotional states; as a result, Mirren and Ford were dressed in dark shades, while Schlaepfer and Randolph wore lighter hues. Outfits for Sklenar and Mann featured a combination of light and dark tones so they could be connected to both their ranching background and their characters' wives. When designing clothing for Nieves and other indigenous characters, Bryant worked with Native American consultants for historical accuracy. All cast members wore period-correct undergarments so their appearances and movements would be authentic. In-costume promotional photographs of the cast were taken on a vintage, large-format Graflex camera.

Bryant, believing costuming to be essential to every character's story, gave Rice and Rogers jewelry and other accessories to wear, despite the script stating they would be fully nude. Production schedules required the costume team to create identical versions of outfits, all with different amounts of soiling, so the passage of time could be properly represented. Besides those that were made, some vintage 1920s clothing pieces were purchased. Co-costume designer Gaby Acosta was present on set to ensure the attire continued to have its intended appearance in varying weather, including the extreme cold in Montana. Elk teeth were added to Spears' vest at his request because they were used to indicate proficiency in hunting among the Crow people.

=== Filming ===
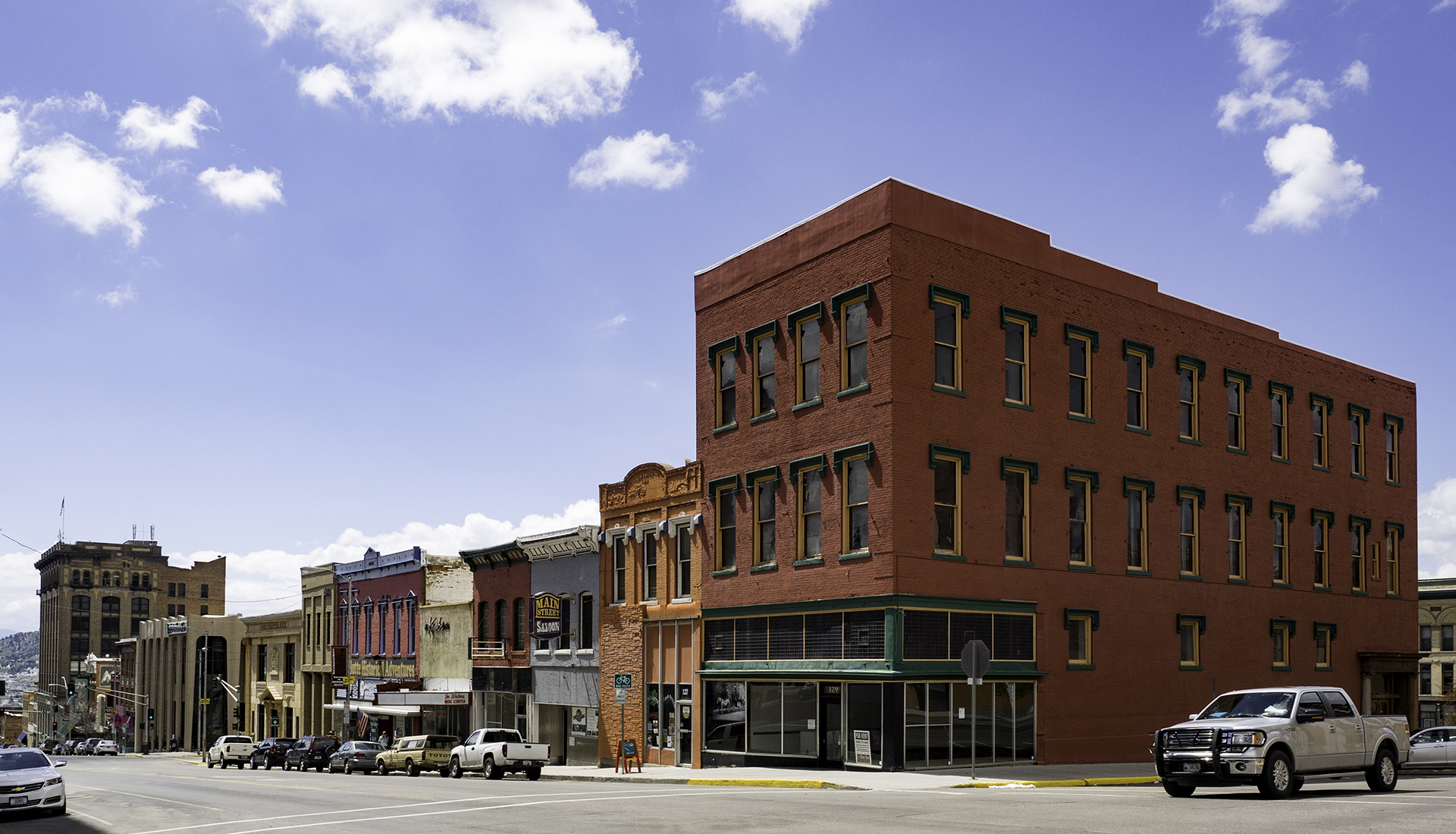
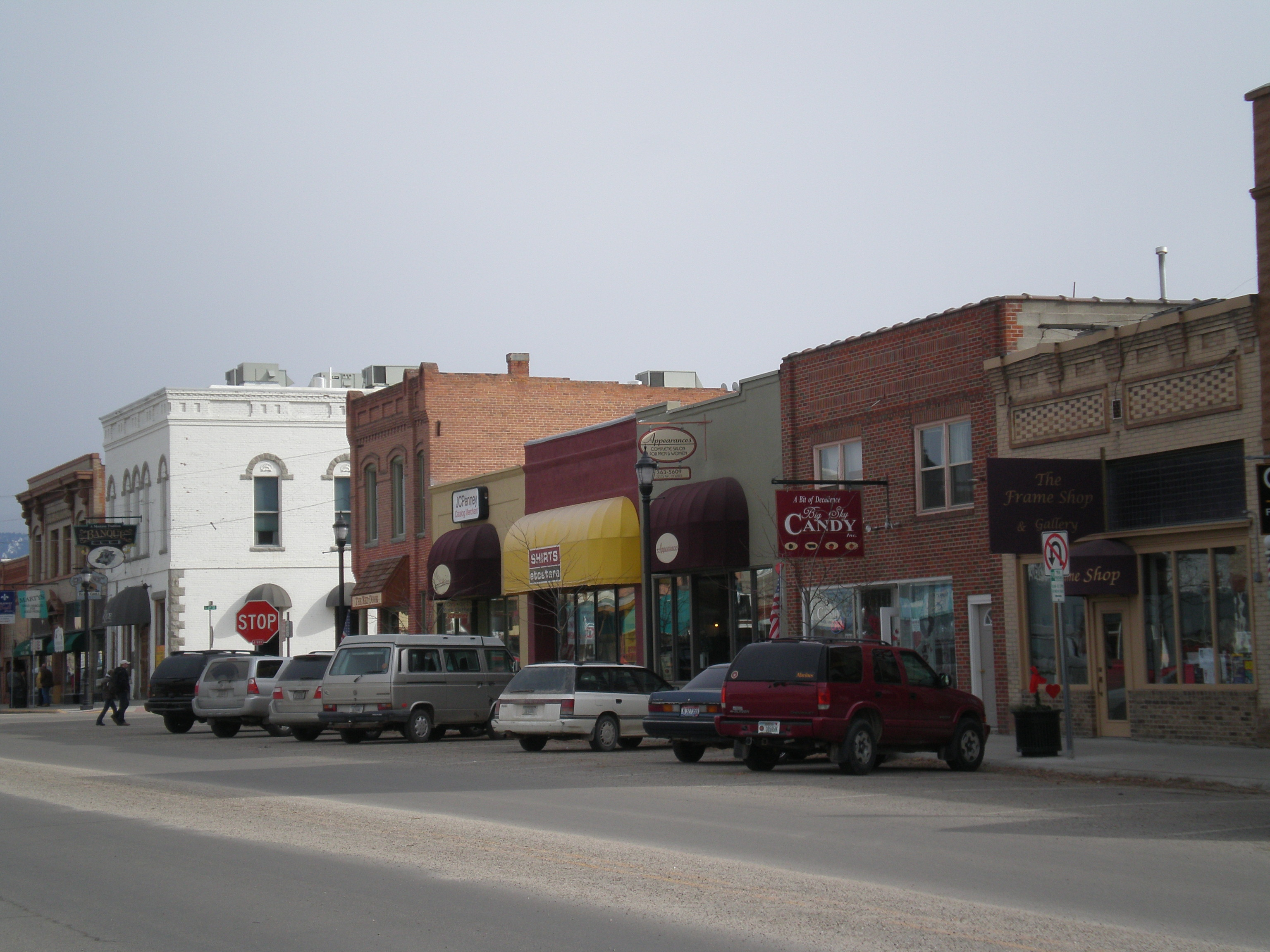
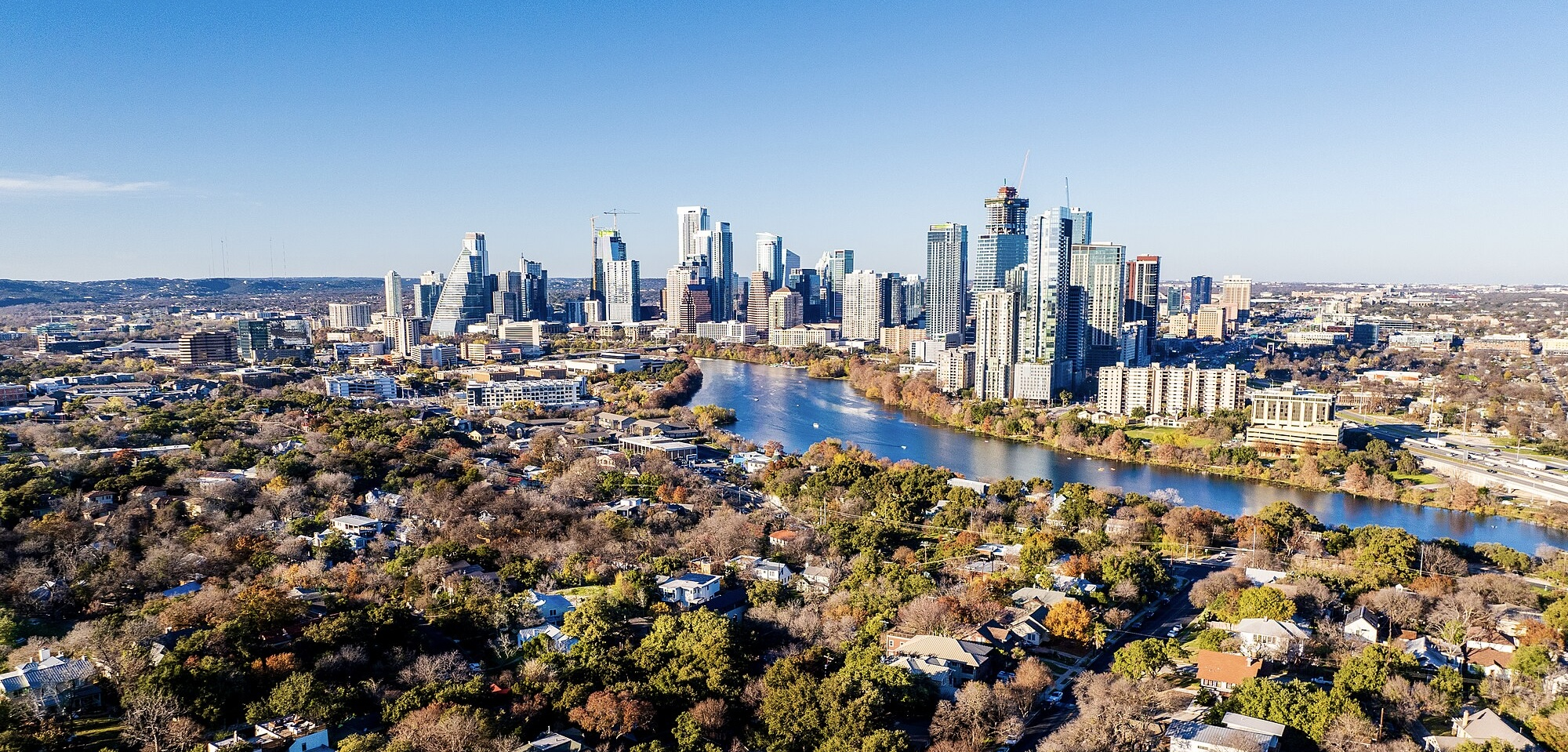
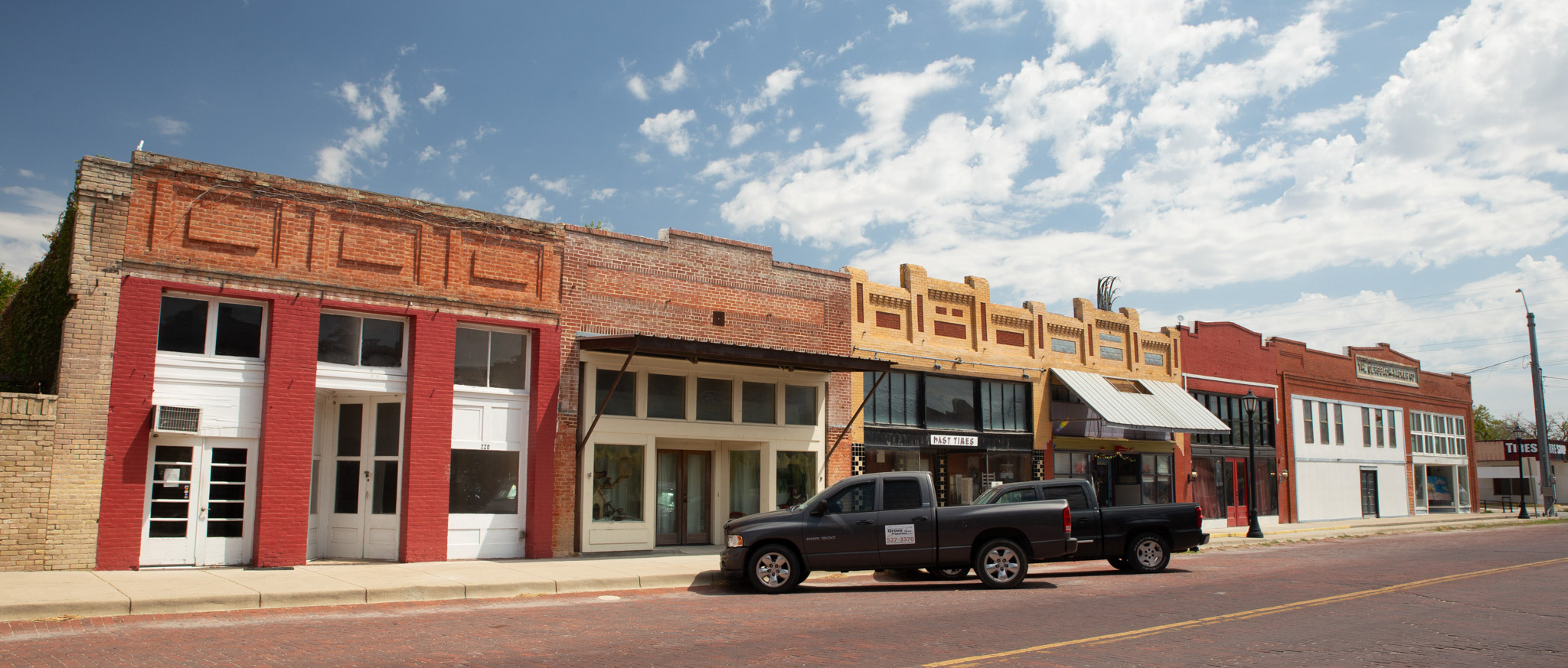
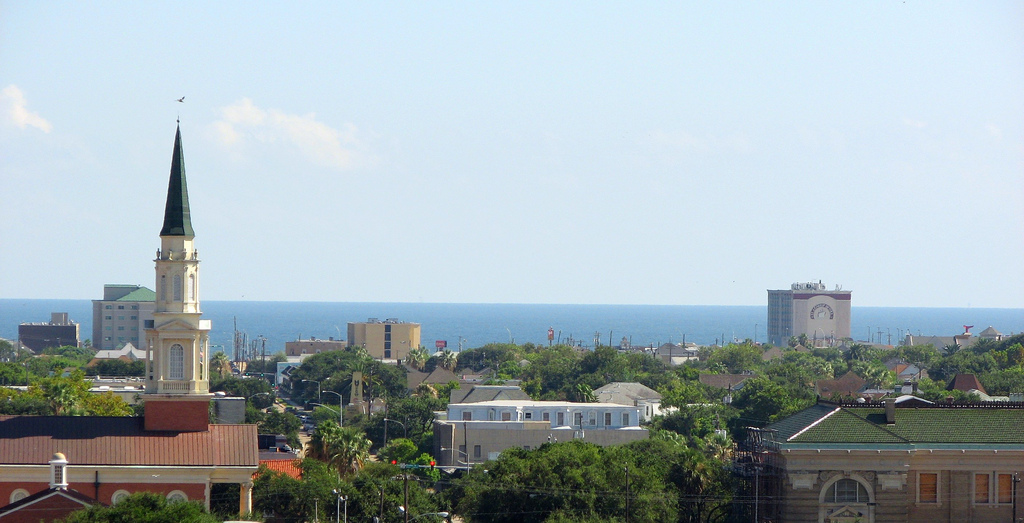
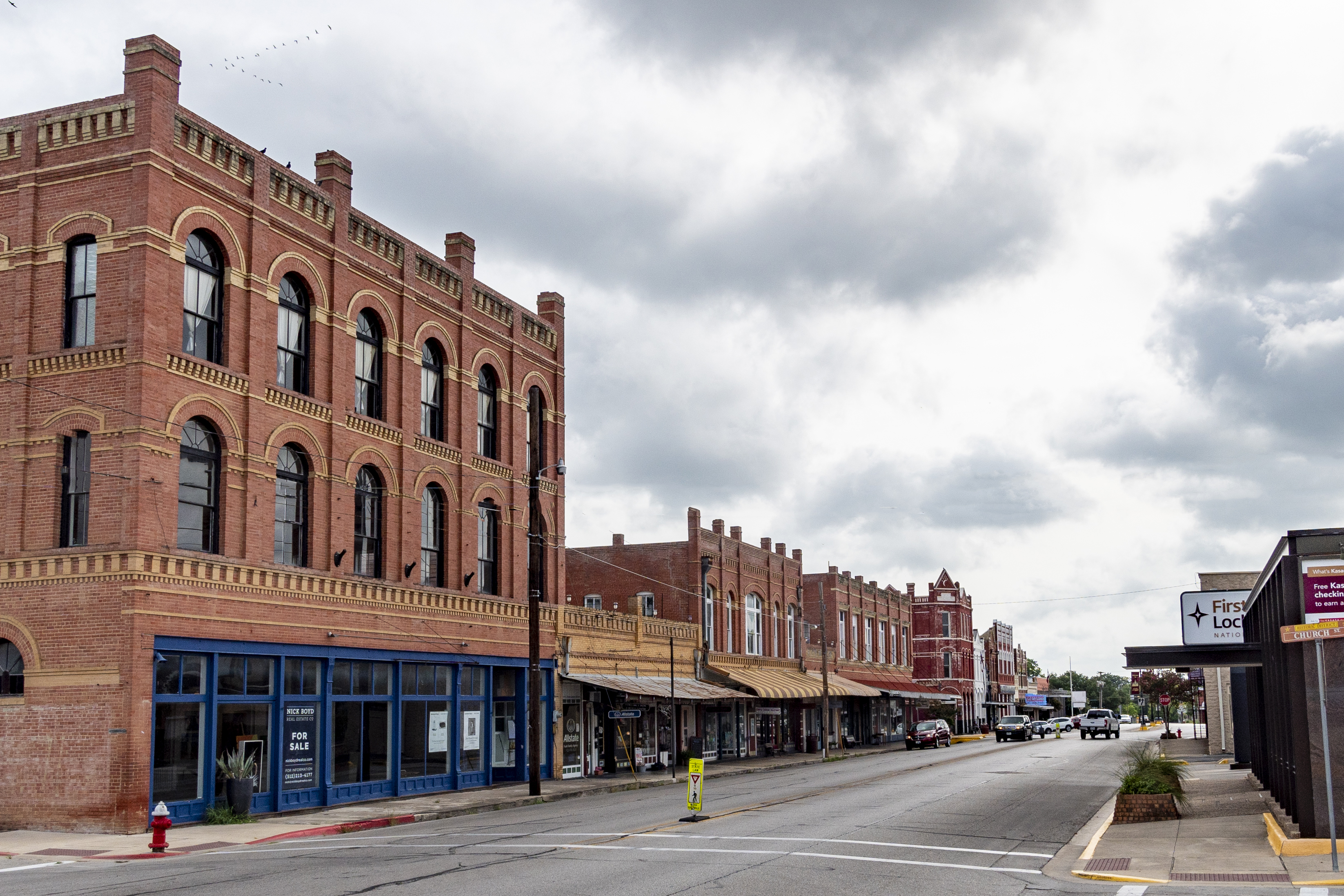
Filming for the season occurred in multiple locations

Left to right, top to bottom: Butte and Hamilton, Montana, and Austin, Bartlett, Galveston, and Lockhart, Texas.

In November 2022, production crews began seeking a contract extension for continued use of Butte Civic Center, where primary production in Montana had been based during the first season, as well as an on-site annex building used for storage throughout 2023. The civic center's board issued a recommendation to county commissioners that they issue an extension, but required crews to vacate the center between January 15 and June 1 for previously scheduled school sports and graduation events. Silver Bow County commissioners approved the request later that month, allowing use of the annex for the entire calendar year and use of the main building from June 2 through December 31. The production company paid the consolidated city-county $75,000 a month for use of the buildings.

Principal photography was scheduled to begin in Butte on June 5, 2023, but by June 1, the civic center's manager had not heard from the production company. A week later, they were informed that production had been delayed by the 2023 Writers Guild of America strike. Production crews were unsure when filming would start, but requested a ten-day extension on their contract for use of the building through January 10, 2024. As the strike continued into July and expanded with the 2023 SAG-AFTRA strike, the production company asked to be released from the contract by the end of August. The lease cancellation was approved on July 19, and the production company paid a $200,000 penalty; the civic center used these funds to replace mobile bleachers that were damaged during season one's production. Crews also stated they hoped to return to Butte once the strikes concluded, but were unsure of the feasibility due to changes in tax incentives.

Once the strikes ended, production teams were seen at Hennessy Mansion in Butte in December 2023. Crew members said despite not using the civic center, filming would soon begin in the city, though officials stated no film permits had been issued. Later reports stated principal photography would relocate to Austin, Texas, where tax credits had been recently expanded. Ultimately, filming took place in both states, with primary production based at ATX Film Studios in Austin, and location filming occurring in Montana. Recording began in Austin on July 8, 2024, and was anticipated to continue there until September. Other Texas filming locations included Galveston, Lockhart, and Bartlett—which stood in for Fort Worth and Amarillo, Texas, and Anadarko, Oklahoma.

Roché and Spears filmed the scenes in which their characters are killed on a sound stage, and recording for both deaths occurred on the same day. Rather than using computer-generated imagery (CGI), the makeup department affixed a remote-controlled light to Roché's face so it could light up when Teonna burns Jacques Renaud. Roché wore protective body pads for the scene in which his character is repeatedly stabbed; this allowed the violence to appear realistic. Carpenter's scenes were also primarily filmed in Texas; she contacted Ralph Zito, a former mentor from Juilliard School, to help her find the proper vocal range for Fossett. Carpenter's goal was to use her lower vocal register; she stated that the extreme heat in Texas assisted her, but made filming both interior and exterior scenes uncomfortable. Frequent lightning in Texas also caused weather-related delays in thirty-minute increments every time a strike was seen. On September 16, production moved to San Antonio, part of which was dressed to appear as New York City. It remained there until September 27, at which time all filming in Texas had concluded.

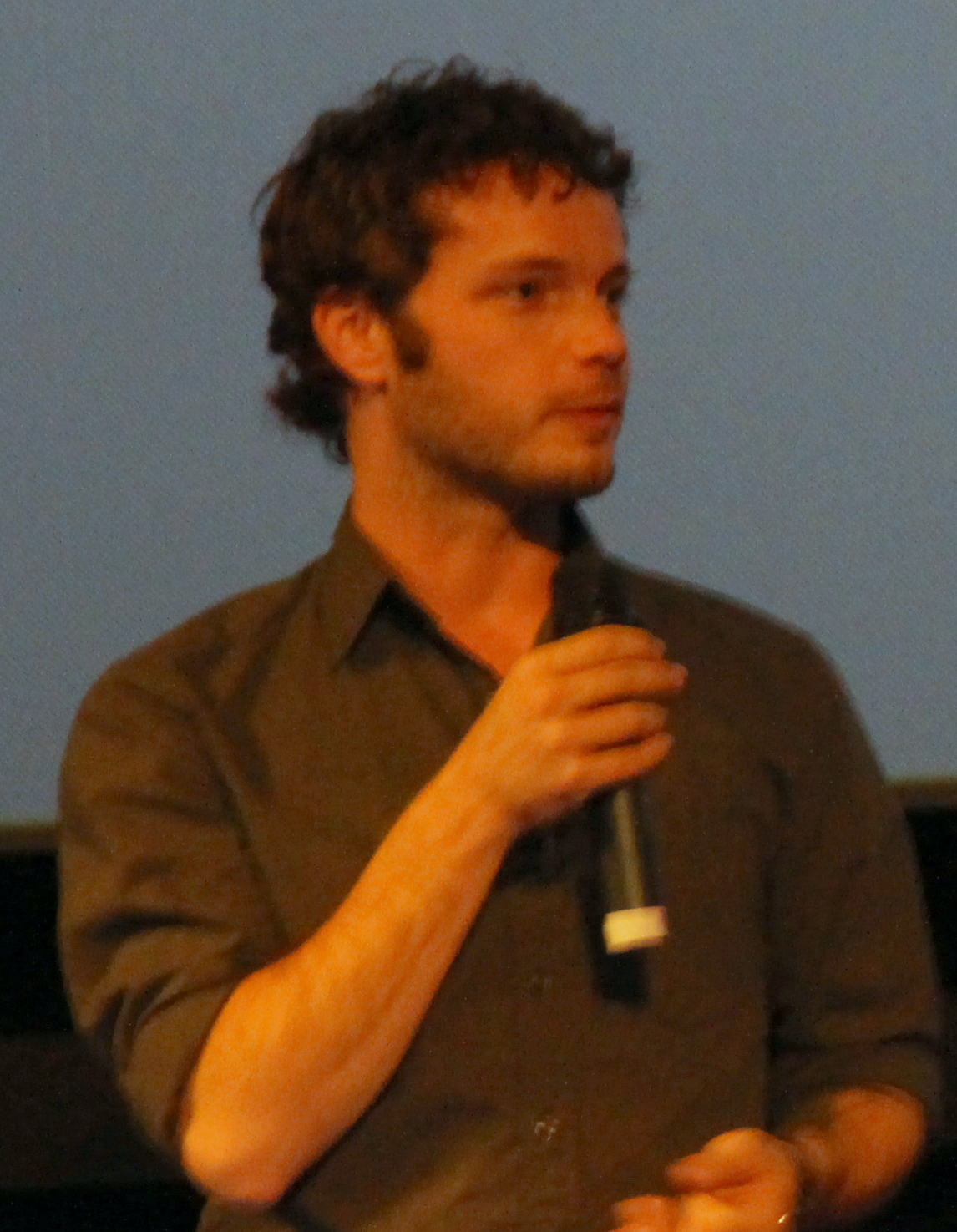
Ben Richardson directed all eight of the season's episodes.

Film crews transferred to Montana in October. Mann's death scene was recorded there; he stated he felt self-conscious while filming this scene, because he was concerned with properly honoring his character. It was reported that he received applause from cast and crew afterward. Despite this being his final on-screen appearance, Mann later recorded additional pick-up shots with Ford. For Zane's brain surgery, a replica of Geraghty's head that could be drilled into was made. A body double was used for these scenes. Prior to filming, Geraghty researched the symptoms of head injuries so he could properly portray the signs. Recording in Montana occurred in Butte, Hamilton, and Milltown. Some filming continued in Butte through November. Richardson directed the entire second season. Sheridan was never on set while the season was recorded due to other commitments; instead, Richardson was tasked with overseeing production duties.

=== Post-production ===
Visual effects work was split between several outside companies and occurred in locations including Bogotá, Colombia, and Montreal and Toronto, Canada. Photorealistic creature work was done by Rodeo FX, who created a wolf and a mountain lion; Folks VFX, who added elk; and Outpost VFX, who was responsible for cattle. The companies also handled other tasks, such as the removal and replacement of out-of-period items, visual-effect snow, and set extensions to the Bitterroot Mountains visible in the background. Further set extensions were done by beloFX. For Pete's horse accident, WeFX made digital doubles of both Guana and his horse he rode on. Before work on this project began, the team viewed videos of horse-racing accidents for visual accuracy. They used computer software to achieve the intended look; this software included Houdini, Nuke, ShotGrid and ZBrush, and the Autodesk products Arnold and Maya. Important Looking Pirates completed the CGI work, which included digital replicas of cruise and merchant ships, a ferry, Ellis Island, and a newborn baby. John Coniglio spent six days editing a shootout scene for the final episode.

=== Soundtracks ===
Brian Tyler and Breton Vivian composed the season's score. Sony Classical Records digitally released two soundtrack albums: the first on February 23, 2025, and the second on April 6. A compilation album containing all tracks from both volumes was made available on the same day as the latter.

==== Volume 1 ====
1923, Season 2, Vol. 1

Soundtrack album by Brian Tyler and Breton Vivian
- Released: February 23, 2025
- Length: 55:54
- Label: Sony Classical Records

Brian Tyler and Breton Vivian chronology
Yellowstone, Season 5 Vol. 3 (2024)	''1923, Season 2, Vol. 1'' (2025)	1923, Season 2, Vol. 2. (2025)

All music is composed by Brian Tyler and Breton Vivian.

No.	Title	Length
1.	"1923 Main Titles"	1:16
2.	"Gone Are the Great Feasts"	2:43
3.	"Whitfield"	1:30
4.	"Want His Hand"	2:15
5.	"Luca's Letters"	2:28
6.	"Fighting for Survival"	1:52
7.	"Teonna and Pete"	3:45
8.	"Another Adventure"	3:07
9.	"Wolf Attack"	2:28
10.	"The Blizzard"	4:35
11.	"A Penitent Man"	1:43
12.	"Ellis Island"	3:09
13.	"Medical Exams"	4:34
14.	"Welcome to America"	2:15
15.	"Calamity Awaits"	3:23
16.	"Last Call"	2:34
17.	"Texas"	1:32
18.	"Spencer on the Run"	2:50
19.	"Teonna's New Life"	3:41
20.	"Fugitive Chase"	1:27
21.	"Alex's Journey"	2:47
Total length:		55:54

==== Volume 2 ====
1923, Season 2, Vol. 2

Soundtrack album by Brian Tyler and Breton Vivian
- Released: April 6, 2025
- Length: 39:38
- Label: Sony Classical Records

Brian Tyler and Breton Vivian chronology
1923, Season 2, Vol. 1. (2025)	''1923, Season 2, Vol. 2'' (2025)	1923, Season 2 (2025)

All music is composed by Brian Tyler and Breton Vivian.

No.	Title	Length
1.	"Now You Go Scream With the Devil"	2:34
2.	"I've Killed"	4:28
3.	"The Stars Will Trick You"	2:44
4.	"Y-Day"	4:58
5.	"Journey's End"	4:05
6.	"The Train Station"	5:19
7.	"You Would Have Liked Her"	2:05
8.	"You Shoot Through Them"	4:49
9.	"Farewell, For Now"	2:10
10.	"The Prodigal Son"	2:00
11.	"It Cost Everything"	2:49
12.	"Took You Long Enough"	1:37
Total length:		39:38

== Release ==
The second season of 1923 premiered on Paramount+ on February 23, 2025, after which new episodes were released on the streaming platform weekly. It concluded on April 6 with a two-hour series finale consisting of the final two episodes. "The Killing Season" also received a March 16 linear broadcast on Paramount Network. Paramount Global Content Distribution handled distribution of the series, and in Europe, the program was shown on SkyShowtime. Season two was released on a three-disc DVD and Blu-ray set on August 12 in the United States, and on August 18 in the United Kingdom.

Home media release for 1923 season two
1923: A Yellowstone Origin Story: Season Two
Set details	Special features	
8 episodes; 3-disc set; 2.00:1 aspect ratio (with letterboxing); 5.1 surround sound; Subtitles: English	Darkness Cannot Hide: 1923 Returns; The Shroud of Winter: Production Design & Costumes; The Women of 1923; 1923: Teonna's Story; What Would You Bring Back From 1923; Behind the Story	
DVD release dates
Region 1	Region 2	Region 4
August 12, 2025	August 18, 2025	N/A
Blu-ray release dates
Region A		Region B
August 12, 2025		August 18, 2025

== Reception ==
=== Impact ===
While the show's first season had a generally positive economic impact in Butte, local residents, actors, and business owners criticized the Montana state legislature for not continuing film-tax credits so as to ensure that Montana remain to remain the primary production location. It was estimated that production of the second season would invest over $51 million into Austin's economy upon its move there. Austin City Council approved an incentive on the predicted $15 million that would be paid in wages to residents of Greater Austin if employees were hired locally. It was believed that hotels and businesses would benefit as well. The program was one of two major productions to film in the Greater Houston area during the time period. An economic increase of 138% from 2023 to 2024 was attributed to the two shows, with a reported $27 million spent there. Despite primary relocation, filming that occurred in Montana was thought to have boosted the economy by "millions of dollars" through further local hires.

=== Critical response ===
Professional ratings
Aggregate scores
Source	Rating
Metacritic	79/100
Rotten Tomatoes	100%
Review scores
Source	Rating
IndieWire	A−
JoBlo Movie Network	9/10
Paste	8.3/10
The Playlist	B
Sunshine State Cineplex	8/10
The Daily Telegraph	4 /5 stars
The Upcoming	3/5 stars

On the review aggregator website Rotten Tomatoes, 100% of 20 critics' reviews are positive. The website's consensus reads: "1923 season 2 continues the path of Taylor Sheridan's universe with more grit, drama, masterful writing." Metacritic, which uses a weighted average, assigned the season a score of 79 out of 100, based on 6 critics, indicating "generally favorable" reviews.

Alex Maidy of JoBlo Movie Network said the second season of 1923 blends the best parts of 1883 and Yellowstone. He wrote that it feels more authentic than Yellowstone because the extreme budget allowed for a higher production quality, and that 1923 could be Sheridan's best series. Reviewing season two for Paste, Lacy Baugher Milas had a similar opinion, saying it made 1923 better than its parent series because it is "grittier, more violent", and better handles convoluted problems. Baugher Milas also said the season starts too slowly and that the ensemble cast is too large for the plot. TV Guide critic Liam Matthews said Alexanda's death in the finale weakens the series' overall story because the reasoning is not rational. IndieWire's Christian Blauvet wrote about the political subtext and said Sheridan's "old school" conservativism distances him from current conservatives. He said Sheridan was "more interested in long-term struggles between tradition and progress" than "aligning neatly with any party's particular platforms".

The Playlist's Rodrigo Perez applauded the performances of the cast and Sheridan's writing for the season, saying that while he frequently writes similar narratives, they always feel distinct from each other. Alan French furthered this in a review for Sunshine State Cineplex, in which he wrote that the Indigenous characters have more-intricate story arcs, and commending Ford's, Mirren's, and Sklenar's portrayals of their characters. Blauvelt also admired Bryant's costuming work, stating it "cultivate[s] a sense of total immersion where you lose yourself in another world". In a mixed review for The Upcoming, Andrew Murray considered season two to be too melodramatic and concluded that it is closer to a soap opera than a period drama. The Daily Telegraph's Anita Singh to some extent agreed with this sentiment, but said it is still an elegant narrative.

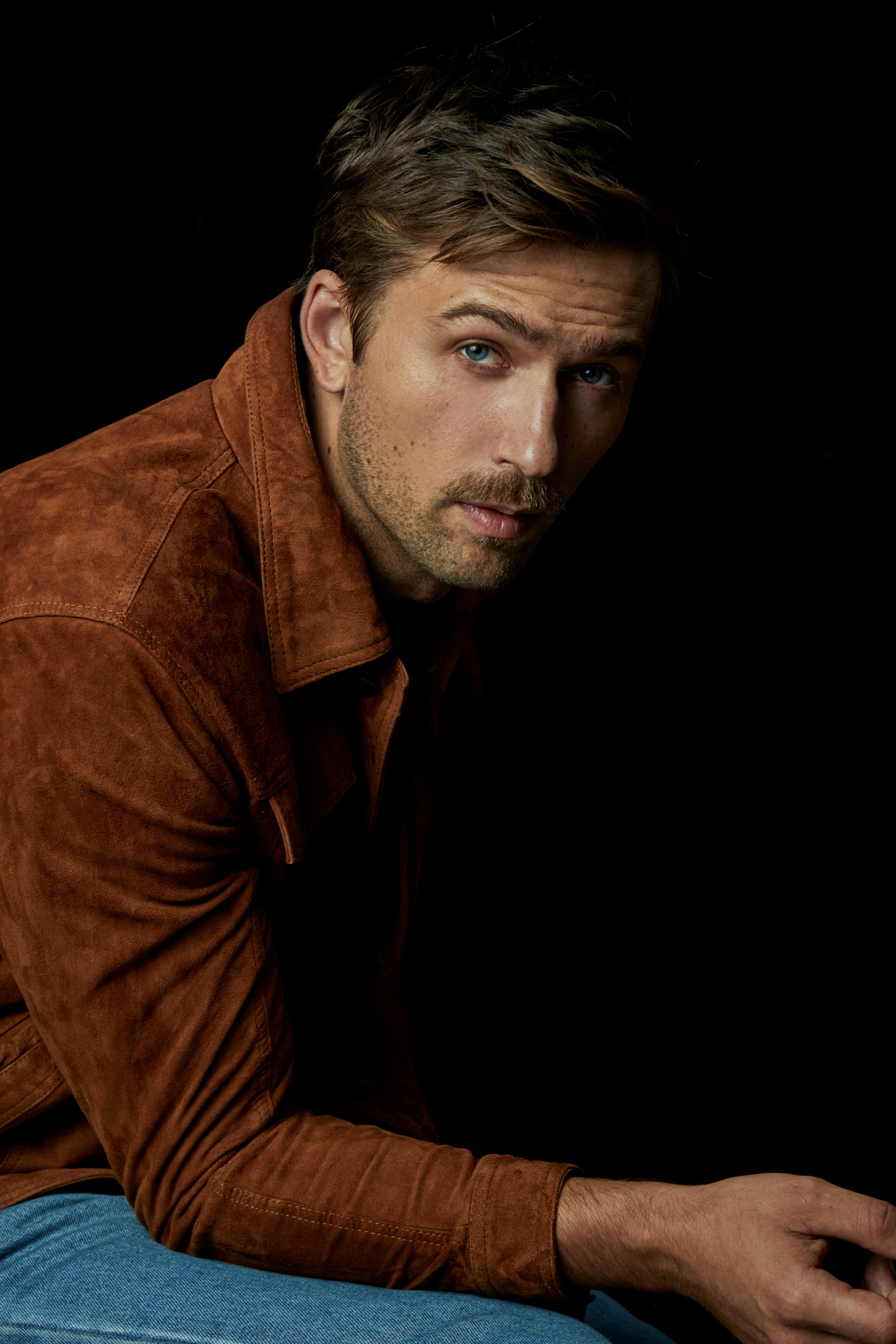
Brandon Sklenar received praise for his performance as Spencer Dutton.

Some reviewers and many of those watching the season criticized the story arc surrounding Whitfield, Christy, and Lindy. Kieran Fisher with /Film said that unlike other violent storylines, such as those at the boarding school which have a stronger purpose, these were "nothing more than pointless torture sequences", and said that it would have better suited Sheridan's 2011 horror film, Vile. Rogers justified the scenes by stating they are realistic, and said it is important for women in similar circumstances to see them.

=== Viewing figures ===
Within three days of its release, the season's first episode was seen globally by 5.4 million viewers, beating the 2.2 million who watched the series premiere in 2023 by 146%. This figure set a record for the highest-viewed Paramount+ original series, exceeding Landman, the previous record holder, with 5.2 million. 1923 entered the Nielsen streaming rankings in fifth place for the week of March 3, with 796 million minutes having been seen. More than two-thirds of these viewers were in the over-50 age demographic. By March 19, viewing figures for the season premiere had risen to 17 million, exceeding its season-one counterpart by 41% in the same period, and over 200% overall. Seven-day viewership on the first four episodes exceeded that of the first season by 56%. At this point, the series was still ranked fifth in Nielsen's streaming chart, but had increased to 809 million minutes.

By April 6, 2025, the penultimate episode had been viewed for 1.06 billion minutes, making 1923 the third-most-watched streaming series, and second among original streaming series, for the week following its release. Across all of March, Nielsen ranked the show as the fifth-most-popular streaming program, further increasing its viewing minutes to 3.9 billion. Fourteen million people watched the series finale, rising to 1.68 billion minutes, within its first seven days, a 41% period-over-period increase from the 10 million who saw the previous season finale. This became 1923's largest audience, with ratings on the entire season up 46%. Social media impressions for season two increased eightfold, from 21 million to 163 million. For the first half of 2025, 1923 was placed sixth on the six-month Nielsen chart, ultimately equaling 8.5 billion minutes. Overall, increases in viewing figures caused the series to rank as one of the three most-viewed Paramount+ programs ever released.

=== Accolades ===
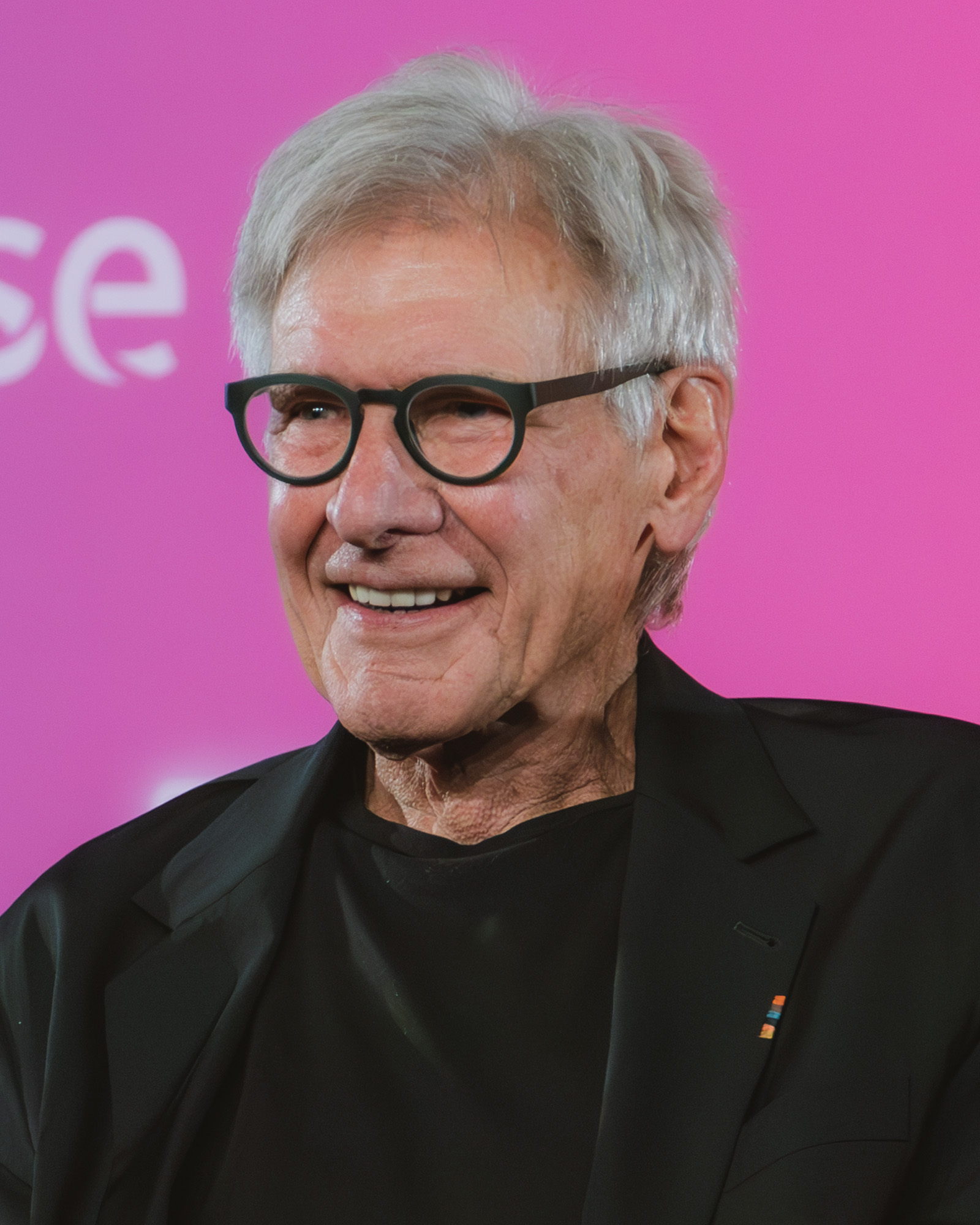
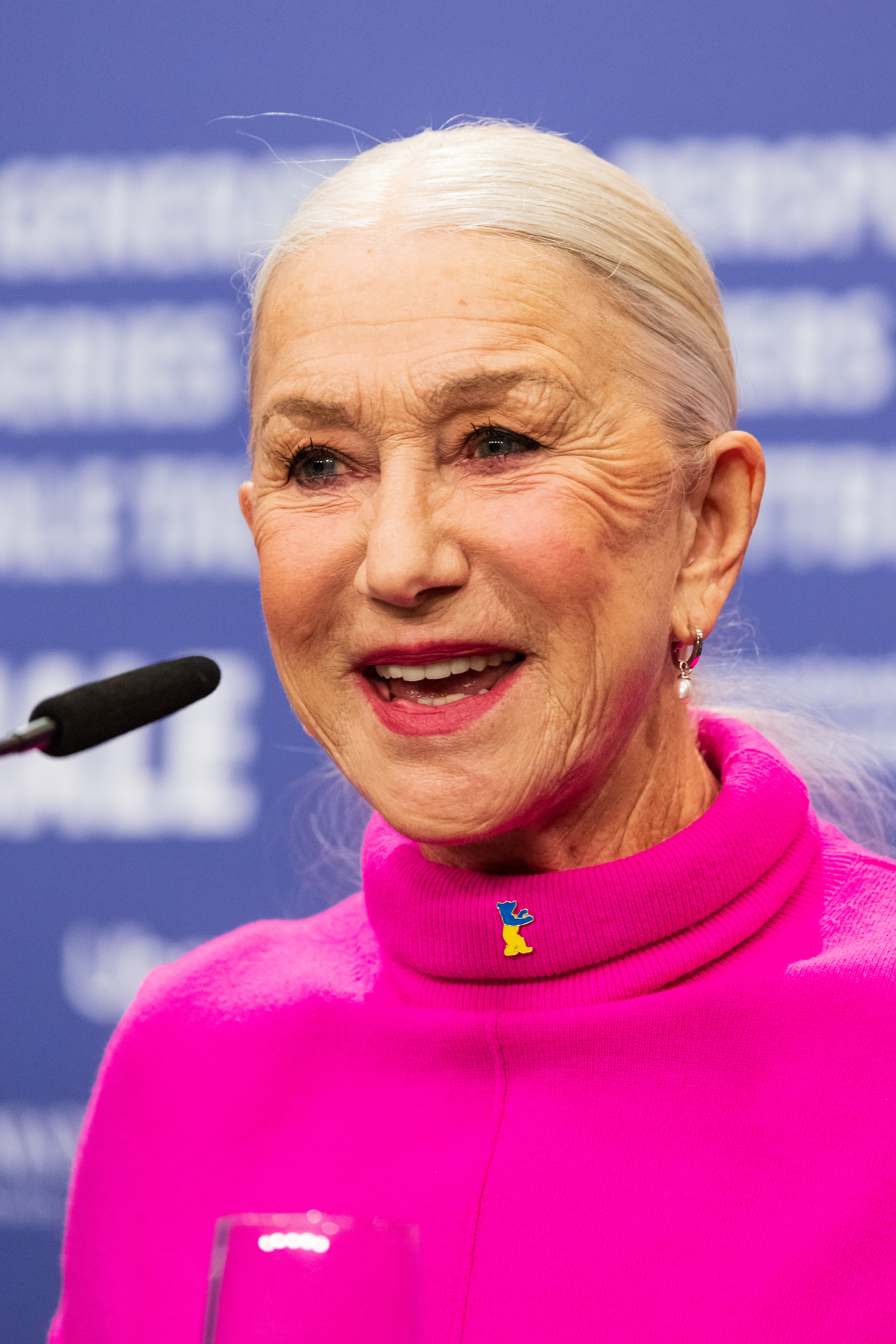
Harrison Ford (left) and Helen Mirren (right) received Emmy Award considerations for their performances in the season.

Corrin Hodgson and Richardson won a Camerimage Grand Prix Golden Frog award for cinematography work on "A Dream and a Memory". The show's set decorator, Carla Curry, and its production designers, Cary White and Lisa Ward, were given a Set Decorators Society of America Award for Best Achievement in Décor/Design of a One Hour Period Series at the 2025 awards show. For their work on "Wrap Thee in Terror", White and Ward were also nominated for an Art Directors Guild Award for Excellence in Production Design for a One-Hour Period or Fantasy Single-Camera Series. At the 2026 presentation, they lost the award to Jon Carlos for his contributions to "Maxine Drinks Martinis Now" on the Apple TV program Palm Royale.

David Zachary Heine, James Crowley, and Hayden Yancer won a Location Managers Guild Award in the Outstanding Locations in a Period Television Series category at the 2025 ceremony. The Montana Film Office also gained a nomination that year as Outstanding Film Commission, but the accolade went to the New Jersey Motion Picture & Television Commission for the 2024 biographical film, A Complete Unknown. For the 28th awards show, Bryant and Gaby Acosta received a Costume Designers Guild Award nomination for Excellence in Period Television for "A Dream and a Memory". The second season of 1923 was also nominated for a Red Nation Film Festival award for Best Episodic & Television Series. The two awards went to Alix Friedberg and Leigh Bell for the Palm Royale episode "Maxine Is Ready to Single Mingle" and the AMC series Dark Winds.

Ahead of the 77th Primetime Creative Arts Emmy Awards, White, Ward, Sean Ryan Jennings, and Curry were nominated for Outstanding Production Design for a Narrative Period or Fantasy Program for "Wrap Thee In Terror". Bryant, Acosta, Jaclyn Tamizato, Kelly Chambers, and Megan Guthrie-Wedemeyer were also nominated for Outstanding Period Costumes for "A Dream and a Memory". Both awards were lost; the former went to "Who Are You?" from Andor and the latter went to the Bridgerton episode "Into the Light". As a result of the nomination for costumes, a pop-up fashion exhibition of outfits from the show was held at the Paramount Studios lot on August 17, 2025.

The entire season was submitted for Outstanding Drama Series at that year's Primetime Emmy Awards, but it was not chosen as a nominee. Ford and Mirren were also in consideration for Emmy Award nominations, the former in the category Outstanding Lead Actor in a Drama Series for his role as Jacob Dutton. Ford was eventually nominated that same year for playing Dr. Paul Rhoades in Shrinking. Several publications noted the lack of Emmy nominations across 1923 and some of Sheridan's other shows, such as Yellowstone, Landman, Lioness, Mayor of Kingstown, and Tulsa King.
