= List of awards and nominations received by 1923 =

Accolades for American television series

1923 awards and nominations
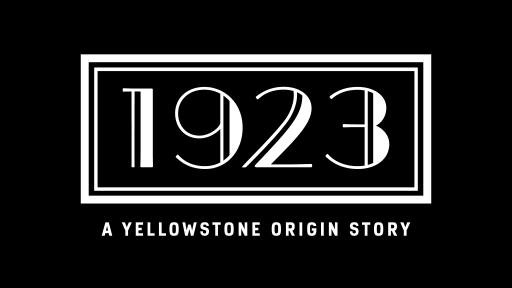
Awards and nominations
Award	Wins	Nominations
AACTA International Awards	0	1
Art Directors Guild Awards	0	1
Astra TV Awards	0	5
Camerimage Golden Frog Award	1	1
Costume Designers Guild Awards	0	2
Critics' Choice Super Awards	1	1
Golden Globe Awards	0	2
Golden Panda Awards	1	4
Location Managers Guild Awards	2	4
Online Film & Television Association Awards	0	3
Primetime Creative Arts Emmy Awards	0	2
Red Nation Film Festival Awards	0	1
Satellite Awards	1	3
Set Decorators Society of America Awards	1	2
Shanghai Television Festival Awards	0	1
Women's Image Network Awards	0	3

Totals (Note: Certain award groups do not simply award one winner. They acknowledge several different recipients, have runners-up, and have third place. Since this is a specific recognition and is different from losing an award, runner-up mentions are considered wins in this award tally. For simplification and to avoid errors, each award in this list has been presumed to have had a prior nomination.)
- Wins: 7
- Nominations: 36

1923 is an American neo-Western and period drama television limited-run series created by Taylor Sheridan for Paramount+. A spin-off and prequel to the Paramount Network program Yellowstone, and sequel to 1883 (also on Paramount+), it is the third show in the Yellowstone franchise. 1923 was developed as a replacement for 1883, which was renewed by Paramount before consulting Sheridan, who was not interested in writing a second season. The series was originally described as a miniseries, but shifted to a limited-run format as Sheridan was writing it and realized he could not properly conclude the story within the first season. A second season was ordered in October 2022. The series premiered on December 18, 2022, and season one concluded on February 26, 2023. After facing delays caused by the 2023 Hollywood labor disputes, season two was released between February 23 and April 6, 2025. Each season contains eight episodes.

The series revolves around a generation of the Dutton family that was previously featured in 1883 and Yellowstone from 1923–1924. Sheridan chose the time period to explore the effects of World War I, the Great Depression, drought, cattle raiding, and prohibition. It primarily takes place in Montana and focuses on a range war between the Dutton family, sheepherders, and land developers. Secondary storylines feature one Dutton in Africa and his newlywed wife journeying across Europe and back to the United States to assist his family, and a Native American girl who becomes a fugitive after escaping from an abusive American Indian boarding school. 1923 stars Helen Mirren, Harrison Ford, Brandon Sklenar, Julia Schlaepfer, Jerome Flynn, Darren Mann, Brian Geraghty, Aminah Nieves, Michelle Randolph, and Timothy Dalton. Isabel May returns from 1883 to narrate the series. Filmed across Southern Africa, Southern Europe, and the Western and Southern United States, the program was noted for its unusually high budget, costing $22 million per episode to produce. It was written entirely by Sheridan, with directing duties split between Ben Richardson and Guy Ferland.

1923 was nominated for thirty-six awards, winning seven. Nine nominations and one award went to the series as a whole or individual seasons. Ford, Mirren, and Nieves received attention for their acting, resulting in a combined ten nominations, with Mirren winning two. Production design was highlighted, especially in costume design, set design, and location filming, totaling an additional eleven nominations and three wins. Richardson received two nominations for directing and two with Corrin Hodgson for cinematography, the pair ultimately being awarded one. Brian Tyler and Benton Vivian's soundtrack, Sheridan's writing, and the Montana Film Office were also nominated for their contributions. Internationally, the series was featured at the Australian Academy of Cinema and Television Arts, the Sichuan Television Festivals Golden Panda Awards, and the Shanghai Television Festival. While the Primetime Creative Arts Emmy Awards has nominated the series twice, many media outlets have noted the lack of nominations in the primary award categories, and some have even considered the series to be "snubbed" in this aspect. The program as a whole was submitted for Outstanding Drama Series, while several main and recurring cast members were in consideration for lead and supporting actor/actress; however, no nominations were given to the series for any of these categories. Other submissions in the Creative Arts section included those for writing, directing, and the series' score. 1923 held a significant presence during Paramount's first multi-platform "for your consideration" (FYC) campaign in 2023, and again in 2025, to promote its submissions.

== Awards and nominations ==
Mirren, Ford, Richardson, and Tyler were all nominated for their work on 1923

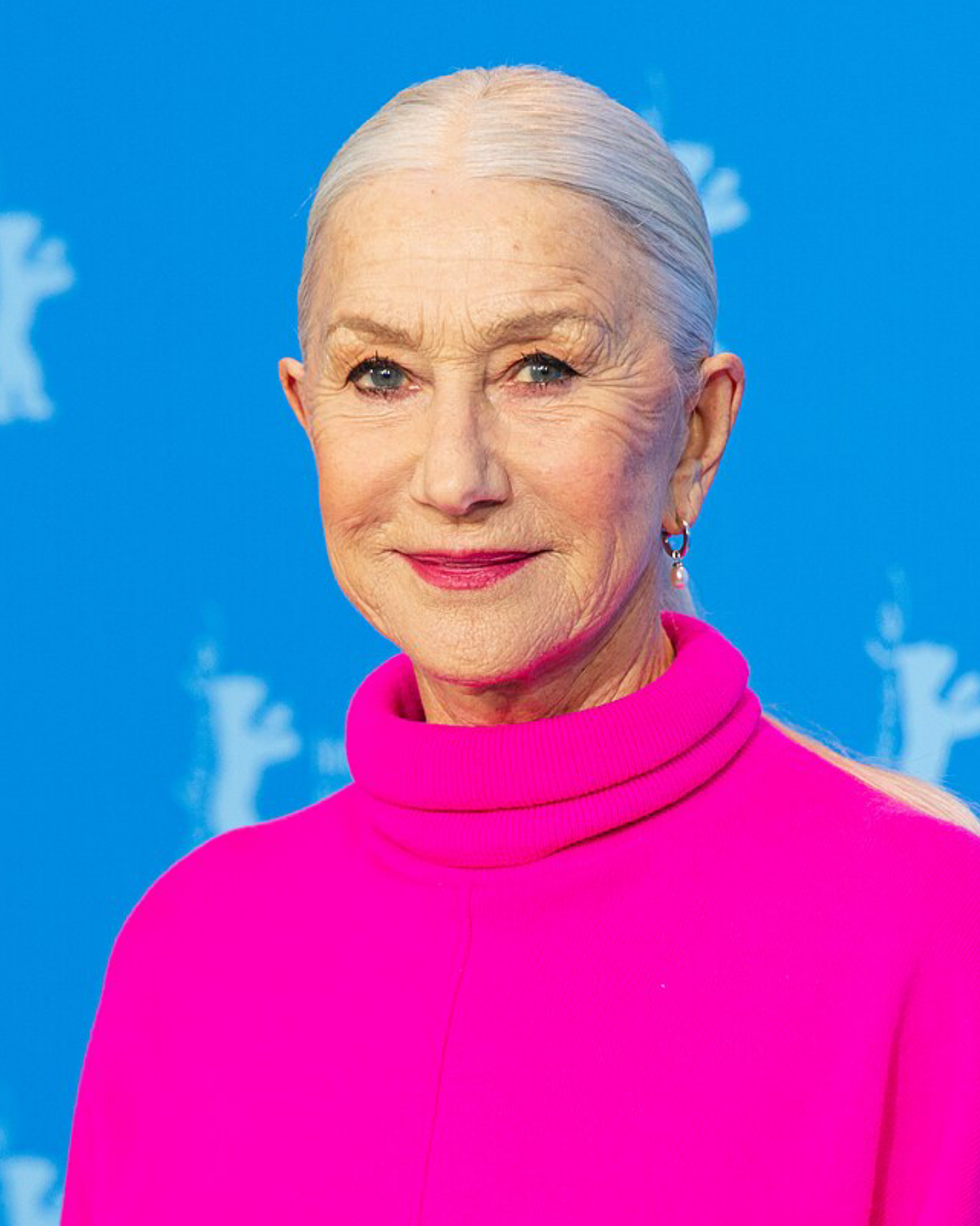
Helen Mirren

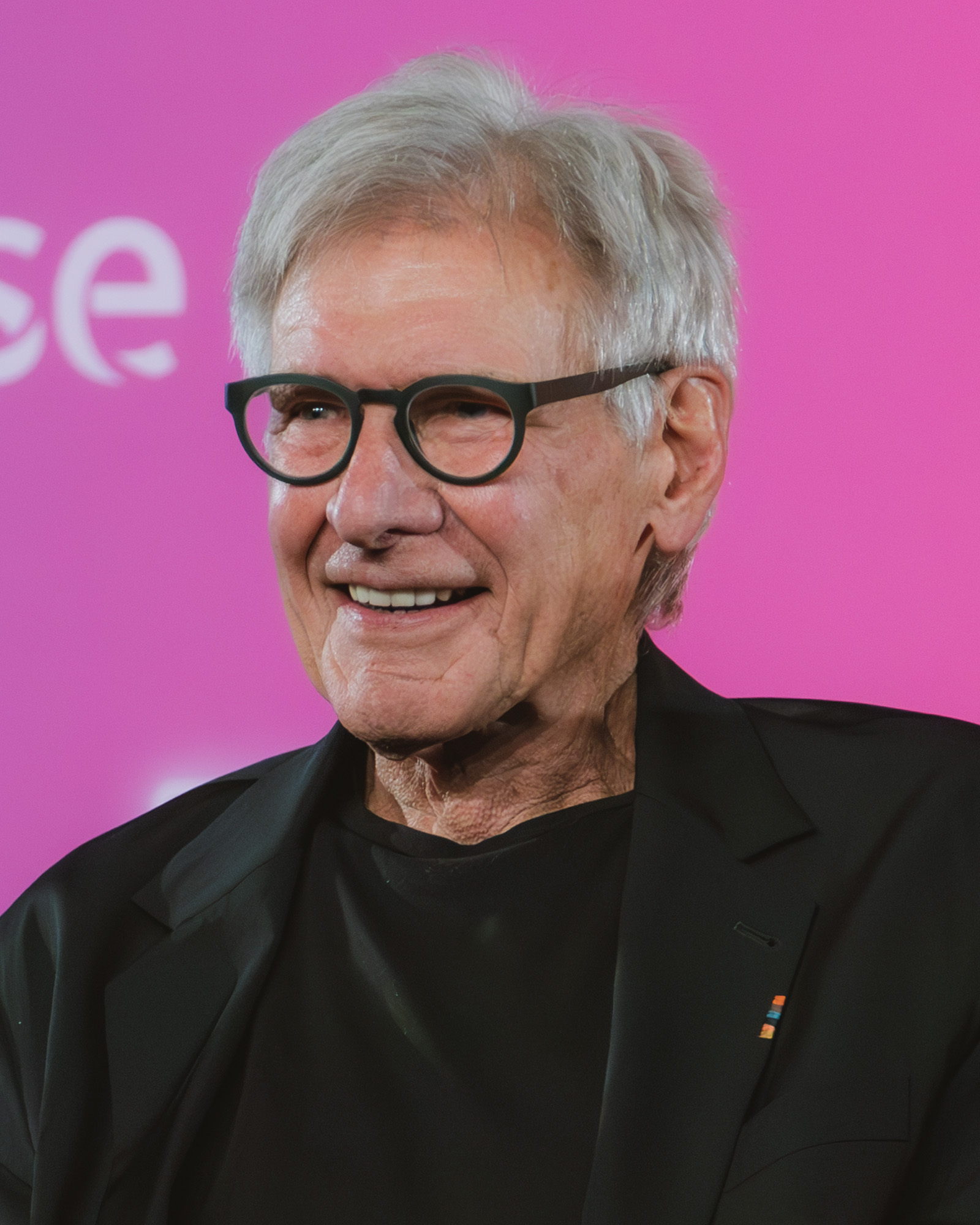
Harrison Ford

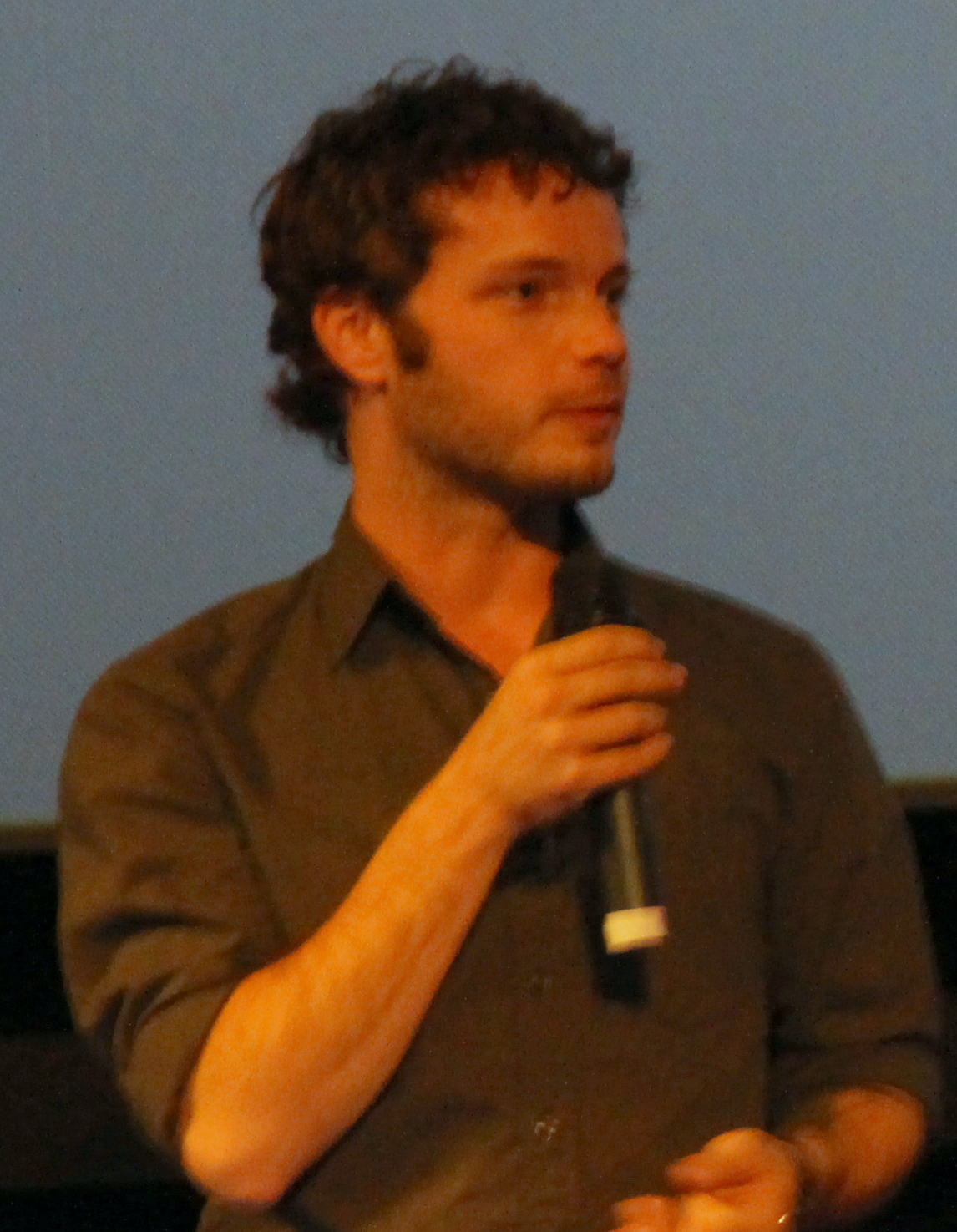
Ben Richardson

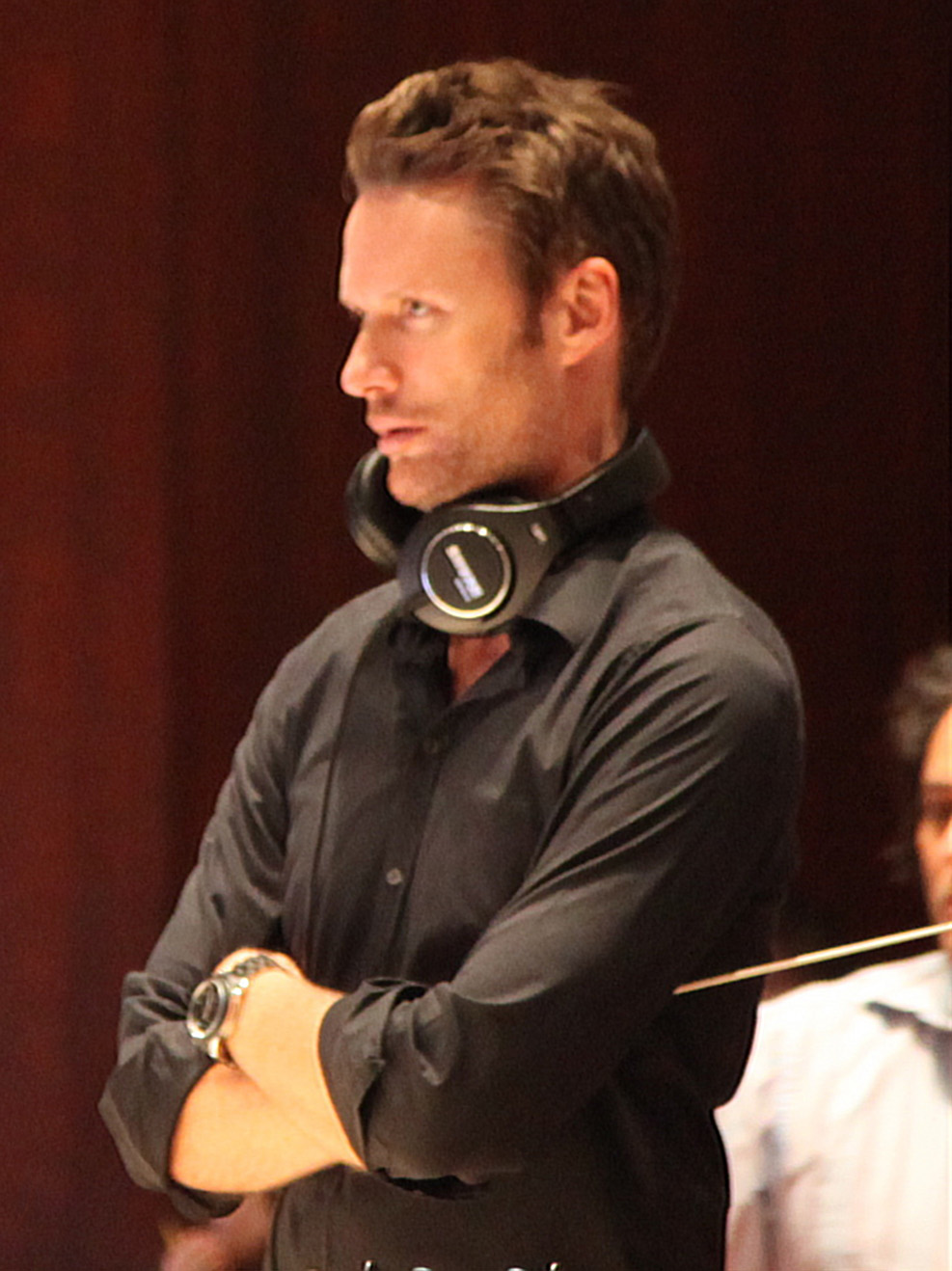
Brian Tyler

List of awards and nominations received by 1923
Award	Year (Note: The year listed refers to that in which the award ceremony took place.)	Category	Nominee(s)	Result	Ref(s).
AACTA International Awards	2024	Best Actress in a Series	Helen Mirren	Nominated	
Art Directors Guild Awards	2026	Excellence in Production Design for a One-Hour Period or Fantasy Single-Camera Series	Cary White and Lisa Ward for "Wrap Thee in Terror"	Nominated	
Astra TV Awards	2024 (Note: This award ceremony was originally scheduled to take place in August 2023, but was postponed to January 2024 due to the 2023 SAG-AFTRA strike. It is therefore the first of two that takes place that year, although the next ceremony recognizes works for the following awards cycle.)	Best Actor in a Streaming Drama Series	Harrison Ford	Nominated	
Astra TV Awards	2024	Best Actress in a Streaming Drama Series	Helen Mirren	Nominated	
Astra TV Awards	2024	Best Directing in a Streaming Drama Series	Ben Richardson for "1923"	Nominated	
Astra TV Awards	2024	Best Streaming Drama Series	1923	Nominated	
Astra TV Awards	2024	Best Writing in a Streaming Drama Series	Taylor Sheridan for "1923"	Nominated	
Camerimage Golden Frog Award	2025	Grand Prix TV Series Competition	Corrin Hodgson and Ben Richardson for "A Dream and a Memory"	Won	
Costume Designers Guild Awards	2024	Excellence in Costume Illustration	Maggie S. Chan for "War and the Turquoise Tide"	Nominated	
Costume Designers Guild Awards	2026	Excellence in Period Television	Janie Bryant and Gaby Acosta for "A Dream and a Memory"	Nominated	
Critics' Choice Super Awards	2023	Best Actress in an Action Series, Limited Series or Made-for-TV Movie	Helen Mirren	Won	
Golden Globe Awards	2024	Best Actress – Television Series Drama	Helen Mirren	Nominated	
Golden Globe Awards	2024	Best Television Series – Drama	1923	Nominated	
Golden Panda Awards	2023	Best Cinematography	Ben Richardson and Corrin Hodgson for 1923 season 1	Nominated	
Golden Panda Awards	2023	Best Director	Ben Richardson for 1923 season 1	Nominated	
Golden Panda Awards	2023	Best Original Score	Brian Tyler and Breton Vivan for 1923 season 1	Nominated	
Golden Panda Awards	2023	Best TV Drama	1923 season 1	Won	
Location Managers Guild Awards	2023	Outstanding Film Commission	Montana Film Office	Nominated	
Location Managers Guild Awards	2023	Outstanding Locations in a Period Television Series	D. Zachary Heine, Joahan Van Der Walt, Joseph Formosa Randon, James Crowley, and Eduard Klarenbeek	Won	
Location Managers Guild Awards	2025	Outstanding Film Commission	Montana Film Office	Nominated	
Location Managers Guild Awards	2025	Outstanding Locations in a Period Television Series	David Zachary Heine, James Crowley, and Hayden Yancer	Won	
Online Film & Television Association Awards	2023	Best Actress in a Drama Series	Helen Mirren	Nominated	
Online Film & Television Association Awards	2025	Best Costume Design – Period	1923	Nominated	
Online Film & Television Association Awards	2025	Best Production Design – Period	1923	Nominated	
Primetime Creative Arts Emmy Awards	2025	Outstanding Period Costumes	Janie Bryant, Gaby Acosta, Jaclyn Tamizato, Kelly Chambers, and Megan Guthrie-Wedemeyer for "A Dream and a Memory"	Nominated	
Primetime Creative Arts Emmy Awards	2025	Outstanding Production Design for a Narrative Period or Fantasy Program (One Hour or More)	Cary White, Lisa Ward, Sean Ryan Jennings, and Carla Curry for "Wrap Thee in Terror"	Nominated	
Red Nation Film Festival Awards	2025	Best Episodic & Television Series	1923	Nominated	
Satellite Awards	2024	Best Actor – Television Series Drama	Harrison Ford	Nominated	
Satellite Awards	2024	Best Actress – Television Series Drama	Helen Mirren	Won	
Satellite Awards	2024	Best Television Series – Drama	1923	Nominated	
Set Decorators Society of America Awards	2023	Best Achievement in Décor/Design of a One Hour Period Series	Carla Curry, Thomas Olive (Note: For production in South Africa), and Sandra Zaffarese (Note: For production in Malta), with Cary White	Nominated	
Set Decorators Society of America Awards	2025	Best Achievement in Décor/Design of a One Hour Period Series	Carla Curry, with Cary White and Lisa Ward	Won	
Shanghai Television Festival Awards	2023	Best Foreign TV Series/Serial	1923	Nominated	
Women's Image Network Awards	2023	Drama Series	1923 for "1923"	Nominated	
Women's Image Network Awards	2023	Actress Drama Series	Helen Mirren for "1923"	Nominated	
Women's Image Network Awards	2023	Actress Drama Series	Aminah Nieves for "1923"	Nominated	
