= Consider =

Consider may refer to:

- Consider (MUD), a capability in some MUDs
- Consider (album), an EP by Boysetsfire
- Consideration, a legal concept
- The act of consideration as in Perspective (cognitive)
