= For Your Consideration =

For Your Consideration may refer to:

- For Your Consideration (advertising), a heading frequently used in advertisements in entertainment trade publications
- For Your Consideration (Kathy Griffin album), a 2008 comedy album by Kathy Griffin
- For Your Consideration, a 2009 album by Taylor Mitchell
- For Your Consideration (Empress Of album), a 2024 album by Empress Of
- For Your Consideration (film), a 2006 comedy film directed by Christopher Guest
- "For Your Consideration" (Holby City), a television episode
- "For Your Consideration", a 2023 episode of Clone High
