= Interracial relations among Native Americans in the United States =

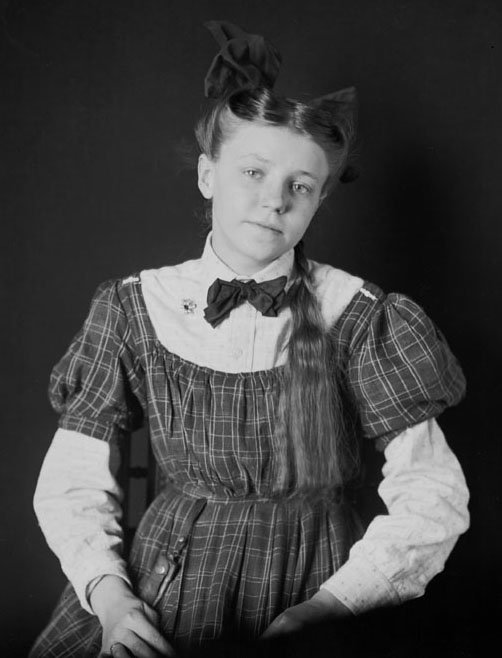
Lillian Gross, described as a "Mixed Blood" by the Smithsonian source, was of Cherokee and European American heritage. She identified with the Cherokee culture in which she was raised.

Interracial relations between Native Americans, Europeans, and Africans is a complex issue that has been mostly neglected with "few in-depth studies on interracial relationships".

== Admixture and genetics ==
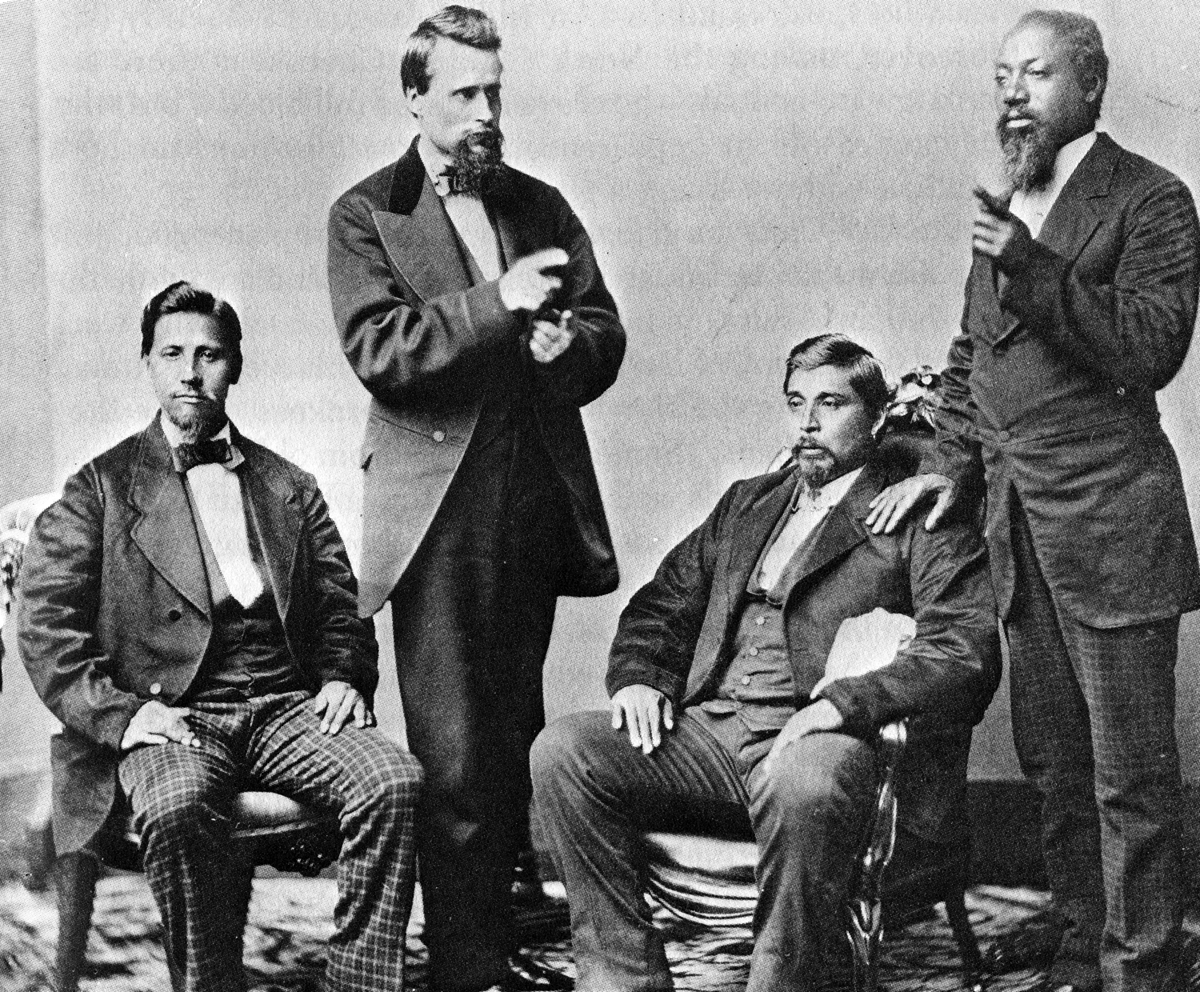
Members of the Creek (Muscogee) Nation in Oklahoma around 1877; they include men with some European and African ancestry.

Intertribal marriage is historically common among many Native American tribes, both prior to European contact and in the present. Historically, tribal conflicts might result in the eventual adoption of, or marriages with, captives taken in warfare, with former foes becoming full members of the community. Individuals often have ancestry from more than one tribe, and this became increasingly common after so many tribes lost family members to colonial invasions bringing disease, war and massacres. Bands or entire tribes were often reduced to very small numbers, and at times split or merged to form stronger communities in reaction to these pressures.

Tribes with long trading histories with Europeans show a higher rate of European admixture, reflecting admixture events between Native American women and European men.

The Indigenous Peoples Council on Biocolonialism has also said that haplogroup testing is not a valid means of determining Native American ancestry, and that the concept of using genetic testing to determine who is or is not Native American threatens tribal sovereignty. Author of Native American DNA: Tribal Belonging and the False Promise of Genetic Science, Kim TallBear (Sisseton Wahpeton Oyate), agrees, stating that not only is there no DNA test that can indicate a tribe, but "there is no DNA-test to prove you're Native American." Tallbear writes in Native American DNA that while a DNA test may bring up some markers associated with some Indigenous or Asian populations, the science in these cases is problematic, as Indigenous identity is not about one distant (and possibly nonexistent) ancestor, but rather political citizenship, culture, kinship, and daily, lived experience as part of an Indigenous community. She adds that a person, "… could have up to two Native American grandparents and show no sign of Native American ancestry. For example, a genetic male could have a maternal grandfather (from whom he did not inherit his Y chromosome) and a paternal grandmother (from whom he did not inherit his mtDNA) who were descended from Native American founders, but mtDNA and Y-chromosome analyses would not detect them."

Given all these factors, DNA testing is not sufficient to qualify a person for specific tribal membership, as the ethnicity admixture tests cannot distinguish among Native American tribes. They cannot even reliably indicate Native American ancestry:

"Native American markers" are not found solely among Native Americans. While they occur more frequently among Native Americans, they are also found in people in other parts of the world.

The only use of DNA testing by legitimate tribes is that some, such as the Meskwaki, may use DNA for paternity tests, or similar confirmation that an applicant who was not enrolled at birth is the biological child of an enrolled tribal member. It is solely about confirming or ruling out biological paternity, and has no relationship to race or ethnicity.

=== African American admixtures ===
DNA testing has provided insight into the extent of Native American genetic ancestry among African Americans, although estimates vary by study, methodology, and the populations sampled. Research consistently finds that African Americans possess, on average, a small but measurable proportion of Native American ancestry, with substantial regional and individual variation.

Based on the work of geneticists, Harvard University historian Henry Louis Gates Jr. hosted the PBS series African American Lives, in which geneticists concluded that Native American genetic ancestry among African Americans is generally less common than many family traditions have suggested. The studies discussed in the series estimated that approximately 5 percent of African Americans have more than 2 percent Native American ancestry. Gates noted that an ancestry estimate of about 2 percent is broadly consistent with having one or more Native American ancestors approximately five to nine generations in the past, although inherited DNA varies among descendants because genetic inheritance is not uniform across generations.

Some scholars criticized the PBS series for not sufficiently discussing the limitations of DNA testing in assessing ancestry and heritage. Likewise, a study published in the American Journal of Human Genetics found that, although family traditions of Native American ancestry are widespread among African Americans, relatively few individuals reporting such traditions had detectable Native American genetic ancestry using the markers available in that study. The same study found no evidence of a significant maternal Native American contribution in the sampled populations based on mitochondrial DNA analysis, while noting that this result applied specifically to maternal lineages.

A 2019 autosomal study found small but detectable amounts of Native American ancestry among African Americans, with regional averages ranging from approximately 1.2 percent in the West South Central United States to 1.9 percent on the West Coast, and a nationwide median of approximately 1 percent. These findings indicate that Native American ancestry is a measurable component of African American genetic history, although it generally represents a relatively small proportion of overall ancestry and varies considerably among individuals and regions.

=== White and Hispanic admixtures ===
An autosomal DNA study published in 2019 found evidence of minimal Native American ancestry among non-Hispanic White Americans, ranging from an average of 0.18% in the Mid-Atlantic region to 0.93% in the Pacific region. However, the majority of White Americans were found to have no detectable Native American ancestry, with the median amount of European ancestry being 99.8% in White participants.

Hispanic Americans, on the other hand, were found to have a large and varying amount of Native American ancestry, with a median of 38% nationwide. This ancestry was the highest among Hispanics from the West South Central Region (Texas and Oklahoma) at 43.2%, and the West Coast, at 42.6%, reflecting the predominant Mexican-American population in these regions. Hispanics from the Mid-Atlantic, on the other hand, averaged only 11.1% Native American ancestry, reflecting the predominant Puerto Rican and Dominican-American populations among Hispanics from that region.

== Prevalence ==
Native Americans are more likely than any other racial group to practice interracial or intertribal marriage among the different tribes and non-Natives, resulting in an ever-declining proportion of Indigenous blood among those who claim a Native American identity (tribes often count only the Indian blood from their own tribal background in the enrollment process, disregarding intertribal heritages). Some tribes disenroll those with low blood quantum. Disenrollment has become a contentious issue in Native American reservation politics.

Some tribes (particularly some in the Eastern United States) are primarily made up of individuals with an unambiguous Native American identity, despite having a large number of mixed-race citizens with prominent non-Native ancestry.

More than 75% of those enrolled in the Cherokee Nation have less than one-quarter Cherokee blood. For the Cherokee it has 819,000 individuals multiracial individuals, and it has 284,000 mono-racial individuals. The former Principal Chief of the Cherokee Nation, Bill John Baker, is 1/32 Cherokee, amounting to about 3%.

The Navajo nation on the other hand has 286,000 mono-racial individuals, it is the largest tribe if only non-multiracial individuals are counted; the Navajo are the tribe with the highest proportion of mono-racial individuals, 86.3%.

== Native American and African relations ==
African- and Native- Americans have interacted for centuries. The earliest record of Native American and African contact occurred in April 1502, when Spanish colonists transported the first Africans to Hispaniola to serve as slaves.

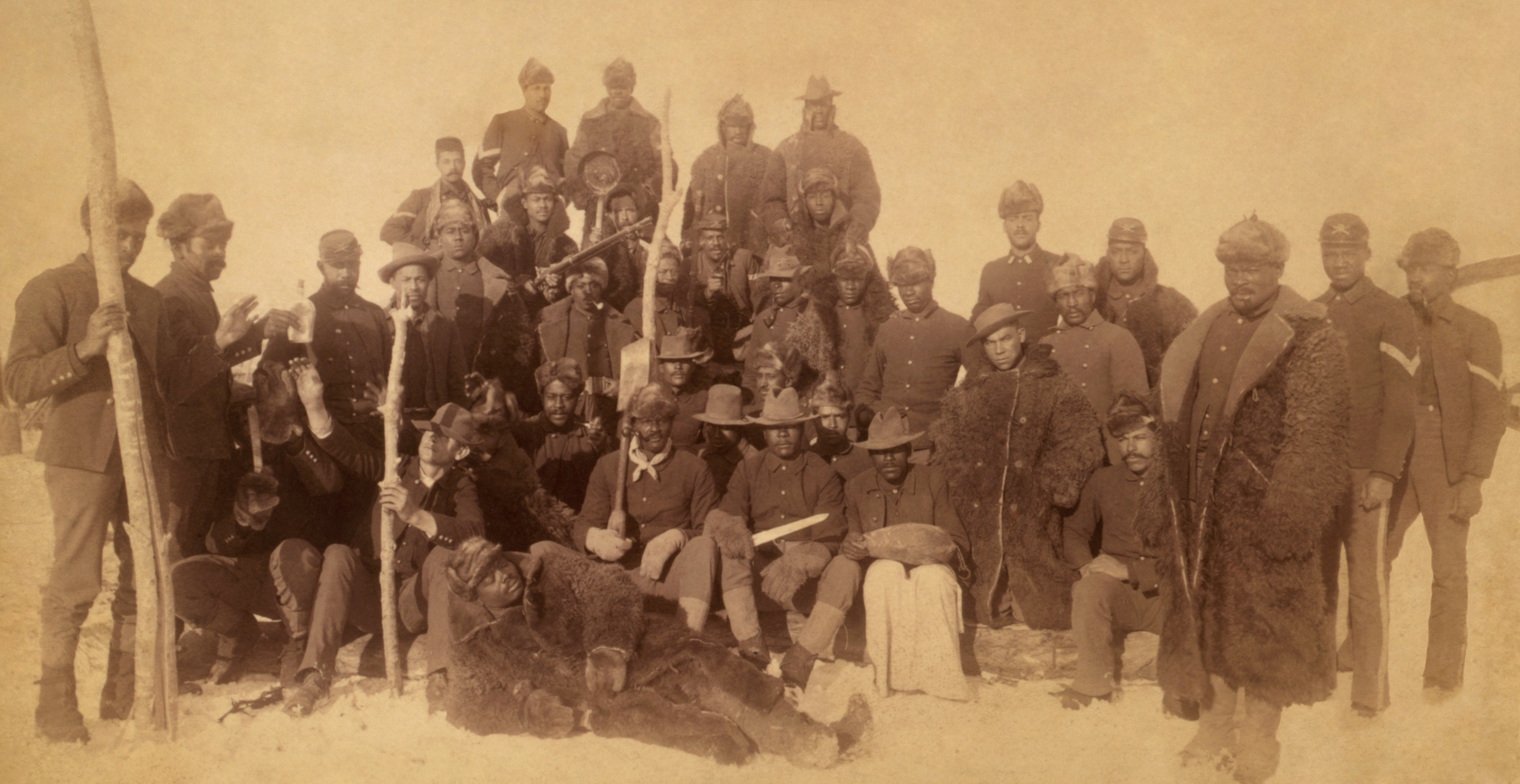
Buffalo Soldiers, 1890. The nickname was given to the "Black Cavalry" by the Native American tribes they fought.

Sometimes Native Americans resented the presence of African Americans. The "Catawaba tribe in 1752 showed great anger and bitter resentment when an African American came among them as a trader". To gain favor with Europeans, the Cherokee exhibited the strongest color prejudice of all Native Americans. Because of European fears of a unified revolt of Native Americans and African Americans, the colonists tried to encourage hostility between the ethnic groups: "Whites sought to convince Native Americans that African Americans worked against their best interests." In 1751, South Carolina law stated:

The carrying of Negroes among the Indians has all along been thought detrimental, as an intimacy ought to be avoided.

In addition, in 1758 the governor of South Carolina James Glen wrote:

it has always been the policy of this government to create an aversion in them [Indians] to Negroes.

Europeans considered both races inferior and made efforts to make both Native Americans and Africans enemies. Native Americans were rewarded if they returned escaped slaves, and African Americans were rewarded for fighting in the late 19th-century Indian Wars.

According to the National Park Service, "Native Americans, during the transitional period of Africans becoming the primary race enslaved, were enslaved at the same time and shared a common experience of enslavement. They worked together, lived together in communal quarters, produced collective recipes for food, shared herbal remedies, myths and legends, and in the end they intermarried." Because of a shortage of men due to warfare, many tribes encouraged marriage between the two groups, to create stronger, healthier children from the unions.

In the 18th century, many Native American women married freed or runaway African men due to a decrease in the population of men in Native American villages. Records show that many Native American women bought African men but, unknown to the European sellers, the women freed and married the men into their tribe. When African men married or had children by a Native American woman, their children were born free, because the mother was free (according to the principle of partus sequitur ventrem, which the colonists incorporated into law).

While numerous tribes used captive enemies as servants and slaves, they also often adopted younger captives into their tribes to replace members who had died. In the Southeast, a few Native American tribes began to adopt a slavery system similar to that of the American colonists, buying African American slaves, especially the Cherokee, Choctaw, and Creek. Though less than 3% of Native Americans owned slaves, divisions grew among the Native Americans over slavery. Among the Cherokee, records show that slaveholders in the tribe were largely the children of European men who had shown their children the economics of slavery. As European colonists took slaves into frontier areas, there were more opportunities for relationships between African and Native American peoples.

== See also ==
- Multiracial Americans
- Métis
- Half-breed
