= For Your Consideration (advertising) =

Advertising seeking entertainment industry awards

For Your Consideration is a heading frequently used in advertisements specifically directed towards members of awards voting groups in the entertainment industry, like the Academy of Motion Picture Arts and Sciences that annually presents the Academy Awards celebrating the best in motion pictures, or the Academy of Television Arts & Sciences which presents the Primetime Emmy Awards for television. They are often found in entertainment trade publications such as Variety, Backstage, and The Hollywood Reporter, as well as outdoor advertising, direct mailers, and events in Los Angeles.

Each year television studios and the television networks spend large sums of money on For Your Consideration ads extolling the alleged virtues of their films or programs released over the previous year. In recent years, these ads have begun to appear online at websites popular with voting members of the applicable academies.

In the mid-1990s, in addition to print advertising, networks began releasing special editions of their programming (screeners) to allow voters a chance to review the content before casting their votes. Mailing DVD sets to Emmy voters became a common practice; clever packaging has been credited with garnering Emmy nominations for otherwise forgotten programs, and the ever-increasing complexity of mailers has been likened to an arms race. Some studios, however, have begun moving their content online to lessen environmental impact and avoid the high cost of postage. Online applications have their own benefits: In 2009 Showtime launched a password-protected site that allowed voters to download streaming video of "For Your Consideration" programming to mobile devices. AMPAS added a streaming option on their website for film screeners in 2019.
