= Danny Cocke =

- Died: December 31, 2025
- Genres: Trailer music, soundtrack
- Occupations: Composer, record producer
- Instruments: Guitar, piano, keyboard, synthesizer
- Years active: 2007–2025
- Website: www.dannycocke.com

Danny Cocke (died December 31, 2025) was an American professional film, trailer, and advertising music composer. His credits contain scores to films such as The Devil's in the Details, as well as high-profile big-budget trailers such as The Hobbit: The Battle of the Five Armies, The Amazing Spider-Man, Snow White and the Huntsman, The Girl with the Dragon Tattoo, Star Trek Into Darkness, Captain America: The First Avenger, Thor: The Dark World, Parkland, Oblivion, The Raven and more. He resided in Los Angeles, California.

== Early life ==
Danny Cocke began composing and playing guitar, bass, and drums at 12. Over the years, his musical path has evolved from playing in various bands to producing and recording for other bands/artists while writing his music.

At age 22, Cocke was diagnosed with stage IV testicular cancer after being sent to the emergency room due to severe pain in the back that occurred during a band rehearsal. As a result, he moved in with his parents, and his chemotherapy treatment lasted for a year. Even though he had to put his musical career on hold during this time, he found the whole experience life-changing and took it as a gift. Being a cancer survivor, he volunteered and helped a lot of patients at the University of California, Davis Hospital. During his 2012 interview with Trailer Music News, he said, "If I were offered the choice to go back, I would go through the whole cancer experience again just to be who I am today."

== Trailer music and film scoring career ==
Cocke focused on expanding his composition and music programming skills during his treatment. After overcoming cancer, he pursued a motion picture and video game advertising career. With the help of his manager, who was connected to a few trailer houses in Los Angeles, Cocke started working on trailer scores, which led to numerous placements in major Hollywood advertising campaigns.

In 2011, Cocke released From the Blue, an album of short dramatic tracks, through L.A.-based licensing and publishing company RipTide Music. The album was created during the economic struggle and became very successful. Later, in 2012, he released his second trailer music album, Verge of Total Chaos, published by Position Music. As of June 2017, Cocke has released four albums for Position Music.

Cocke's music has been featured in numerous high-profile movie trailers, including but not limited to The Hobbit: The Battle of the Five Armies, The Maze Runner, The Amazing Spider-Man, Snow White and the Huntsman, The Girl with the Dragon Tattoo, Star Trek Into Darkness, Captain America: The First Avenger, Thor, Thor: The Dark World, Parkland, Oblivion, The Machine, Green Lantern, Bridge of Spies, The Raven, The Purge: Anarchy, and Runner, Runner.

Furthermore, his music has been used in multiple video game trailers such as Titanfall 2, The Witcher 3, Call of Duty: Advanced Warfare, Assassin's Creed: Black Flag, Halo: Nightfall, Call of Duty: Modern Warfare 3, and more.

In 2012, Cocke was hired to score his first feature film, The Devil's in the Details, directed by Waymon Boone.

Later, in 2015, his track Hunters Vs Monster was featured in the opening cinematic of the video game Evolve.

Cocke was nominated for Best Song/Score in the Trailer category during the 2014 Hollywood Music in Media Awards.

In 2016, Cocke was invited to BMI's Annual Master Conducting Workshop (a program which only accepts eight composers).

Cocke's music has been featured in numerous TV Shows and promos such as Catfish, The Walking Dead, Daredevil, and more.

In 2018, Cocke created the theme in Tom Clancy's Rainbow Six Siege invitational Esports competition.

Cocke also composed the theme song for the Runner's World podcast, Human Race.

== Discography ==
=== RipTide Music albums ===
- From the Blue (2011)

=== Position Music albums ===
- Verge of Total Chaos (2012)
- Darkness Devours (2013)
- Generate, Organize, Destroy (2016)
- Starchaser (2017)

== See also ==
- Trailer music
- Film score
- 2WEI
