= Embattled (film) =

2020 sports film

- Film poster
- Directed by: Nick Sarkisov
- Written by: David McKenna
- Produced by: Eryl Cochran; Scott LaStaiti; Sergey Sarkisov
- Starring: Stephen Dorff; Darren Mann; Karrueche Tran; Colin McKenna; Donald Faison; Saïd Taghmaoui; Elizabeth Reaser
- Edited by: Mark Sanger
- Distributed by: IFC Films
- Release date: November 20, 2020
- Running time: 117 minutes
- Country: United States
- Language: English
- Box office: $32,259

Embattled is a 2020 American sports drama film directed by Nick Sarkisov, written by David McKenna, based on a story by Frank Ragen and produced by Eryl Cochran. It stars Stephen Dorff as a reigning mixed martial arts fighter (largely styled after Conor McGregor) whose harsh and abusive nature brings him into conflict with his son.

IFC Films acquired distribution rights to the film in July 2020.

== Plot ==
Raised by abusive father, Cash Boykins (Stephen Dorff) abandoned his family when his second son was born with Williams syndrome. Over the years, while he made a successful career as an MMA fighter channeling his anger into the octagon, his eldest son Jett (Darren Mann) becomes the caregiver to his younger brother Quinn (Colin McKenna) and decides to be an MMA fighter as well. Father and son will soon find themselves battling each other in the cage.

== Cast ==
- Stephen Dorff as Cash "The Slayer" Boykins
- Darren Mann as Jett William Boykins
  - David Alexander Kaplan as Young Jett William Boykins
- Karrueche Tran as Jade Boykins
- Colin McKenna as Quinn Boykins
- Jakari Fraser as Kingston Boykins
- Donald Faison as Mr. Dan Stewart
- Saïd Taghmaoui as Claude Yaurek
- Elizabeth Reaser as Susan Boykins
- Drew Starkey as Tanner Van Holt
- Ethan Melisano as Timofei "The Terrible" Kozlov
- Brian Walters as Christian Kim
- Leopold Manswell as Kareef Hardicke
- Brian Oerly as Jamie Ghould
- Chip Carriere as Earl Hardy
- Adam Karst as Rami Elbahri
- Mark Fite as David Adelsberg
- Michael Wayne Foster as Richie Simmonsma
- Oliver Trevena as Syd Man
- Donald Cerrone as Jack "Autograph Jack"
- Kasandra Bandfield as Alice Yaurek
- Mimi Davila as Patty Martinez
- Marie Burke as Amber Jefferson
- Sienna Novikov as Emma Levesque
- Ava Capri as Keaton Carmichael
- Lindsey Garrett as Ms. Malek
- Marcus Bailey as Daryl
- Kevin Ianucci as Patrick
- Drew Scheid as Brian
- Benjamin M. Pelham as Jerry
- Demorian Treyse Lizana as Jamar
- Charline St. Charles as Leticia
- Mina Ownlee as Gladys
- Kenny Florian as Himself
- Tyron Woodley as Himself

== Production ==
The film was shot in Birmingham, Alabama, from September 24 to November 4, 2018.

== Release ==
IFC Films acquired distribution rights to the film in July 2020, and released it on domestic theaters and on VOD on November 20, 2020.

== Reception ==
=== Box office ===
Embattled grossed $32,259 only in the United States and Canada.

=== Critical response ===
On review aggregator Rotten Tomatoes, the film holds an approval rating of 71% based on 24 reviews, with an average of 6.8/10. The website's critics consensus reads: "Embattled fights genre clichés to a draw while landing enough emotional punches to make this a sports drama worth watching." On Metacritic, the film holds a rating of 56 out of 100, based on eight critics, indicating "mixed or average" reviews. The Los Angeles Times gave the film a great review, describing it as "an exciting, scrappy brawler" and "as a moving family drama, it's a contender."
