= Bellefield Boiler Plant =

Historic university heating plant in Pittsburgh

Coordinates: 40.4422°N 79.9490°W

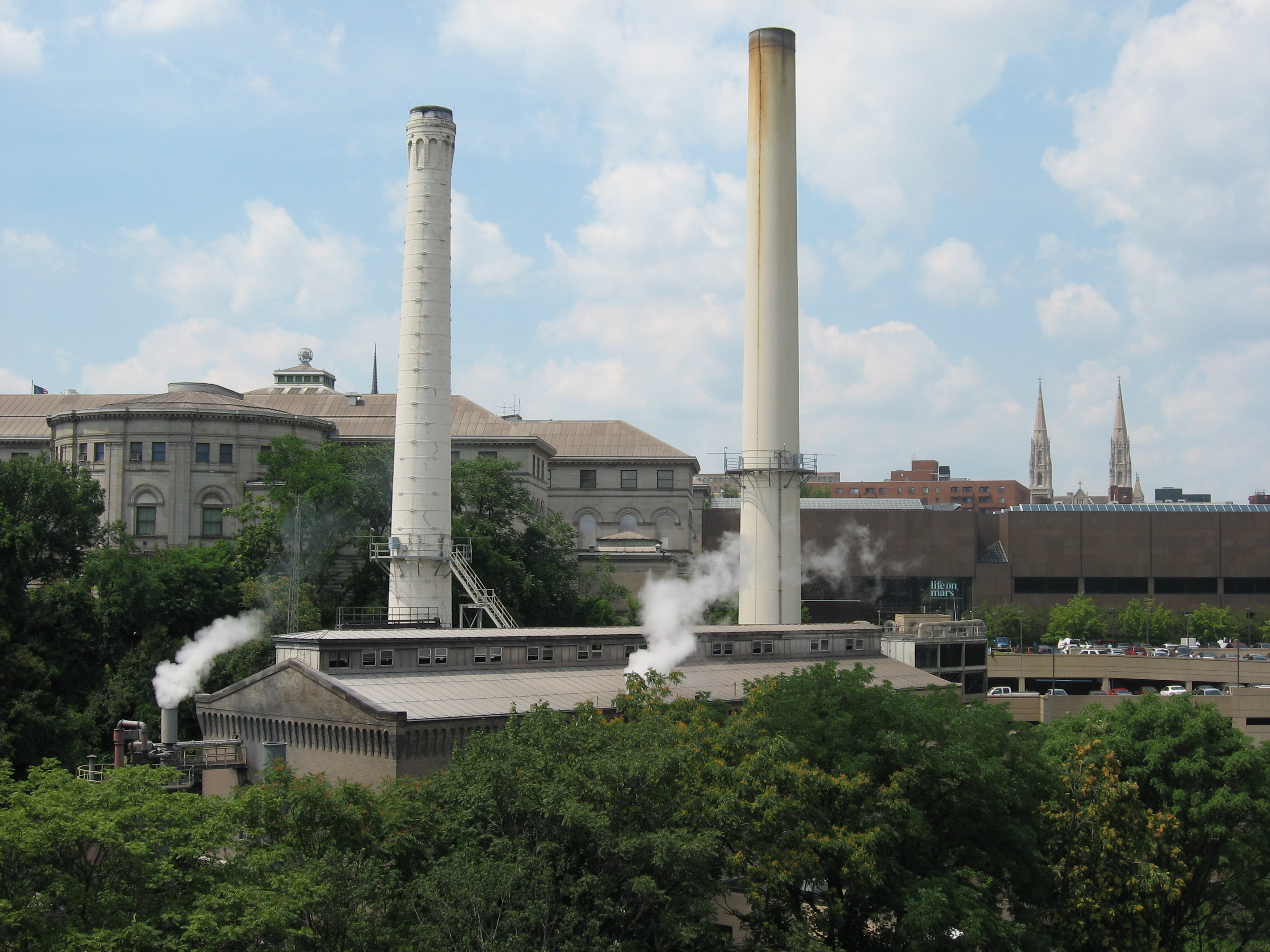
The Bellefield Boiler Plant, affectionately known as the "Cloud Factory", in Junction Hollow

Bellefield Boiler Plant, also known as "The Cloud Factory" from its nickname's use in Michael Chabon's 1988 debut novel The Mysteries of Pittsburgh, is a boiler plant located in Junction Hollow (referred to as "The Lost Neighborhood" in Chabon's book) between the Carnegie Institute of Pittsburgh and Carnegie Mellon University in the Oakland district of Pittsburgh, Pennsylvania.

Built in 1907 to provide steam heat for Carnegie Museum, it was designed in the Romanesque Revival style by the architectural firm Longfellow, Alden & Harlow. The 1907 brick chimney measured 150 feet (removed in 2010), and the newer concrete stack (built in 1966) is 255 feet. The plant has burned both coal and natural gas but stopped burning coal on July 1, 2009. Its steam system expanded in the 1930s to service the University of Pittsburgh's Cathedral of Learning. Today it pumps heat to most of the major buildings in Oakland. It is owned by a consortium made up of the University of Pittsburgh, University of Pittsburgh Medical Center, Carnegie Mellon University, the Carnegie Museum, the City of Pittsburgh, and the Pittsburgh Public Schools.

During its coal burning years, the plant could consume up to a 70-ton hopper car of coal per day, delivered by the Pittsburgh Junction Railroad (now in the P&W Subdivision of CSX) that ran through Junction Hollow next to the plant. The plant's small 1942 Plymouth DE 25T locomotive would shuttle the cars between the siding and the plant via a wooden trestle bridge (demolished 2012) spanning Boundary Street.

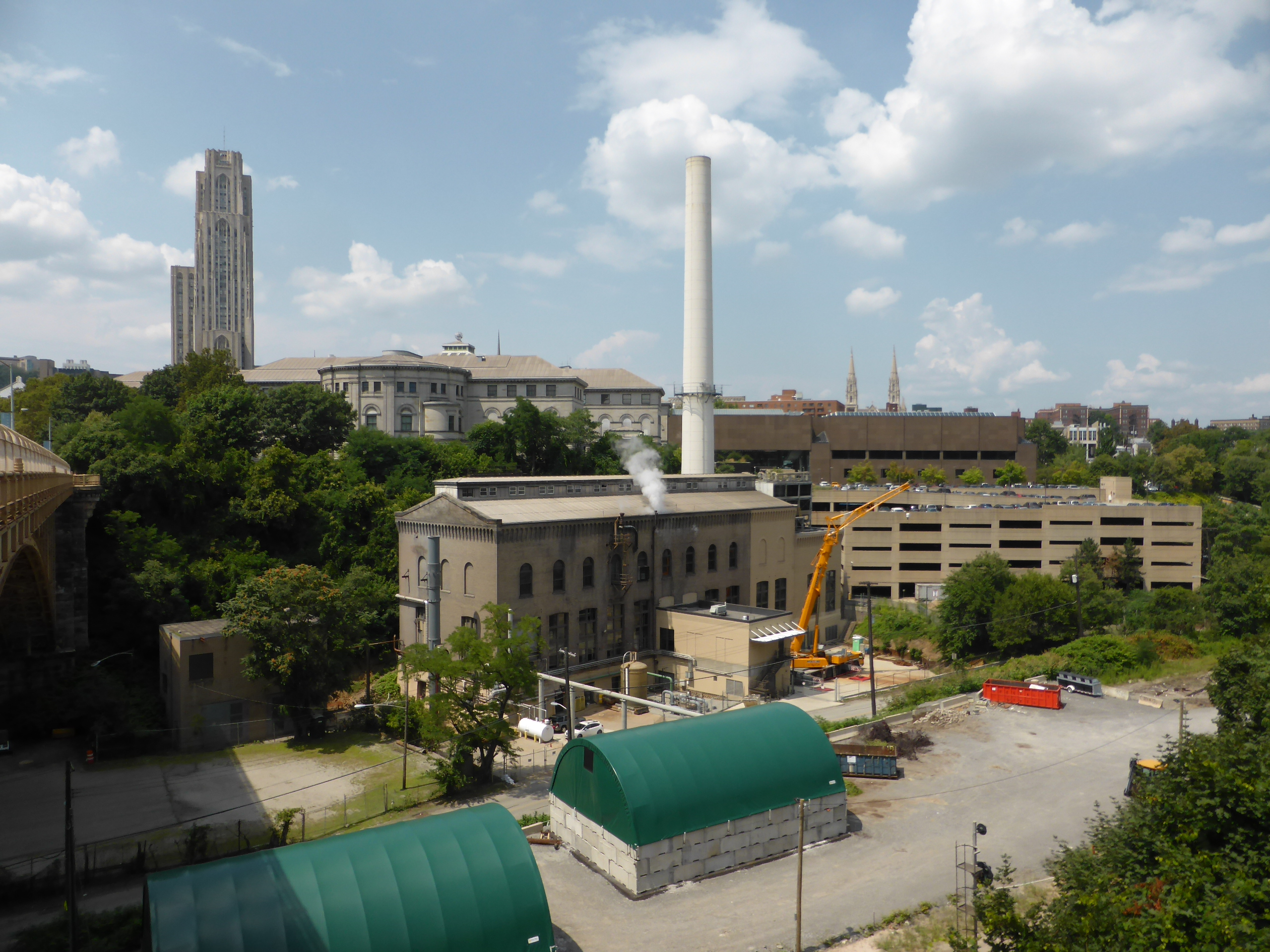
Bellefield Boiler Plant as it looked in 2014.

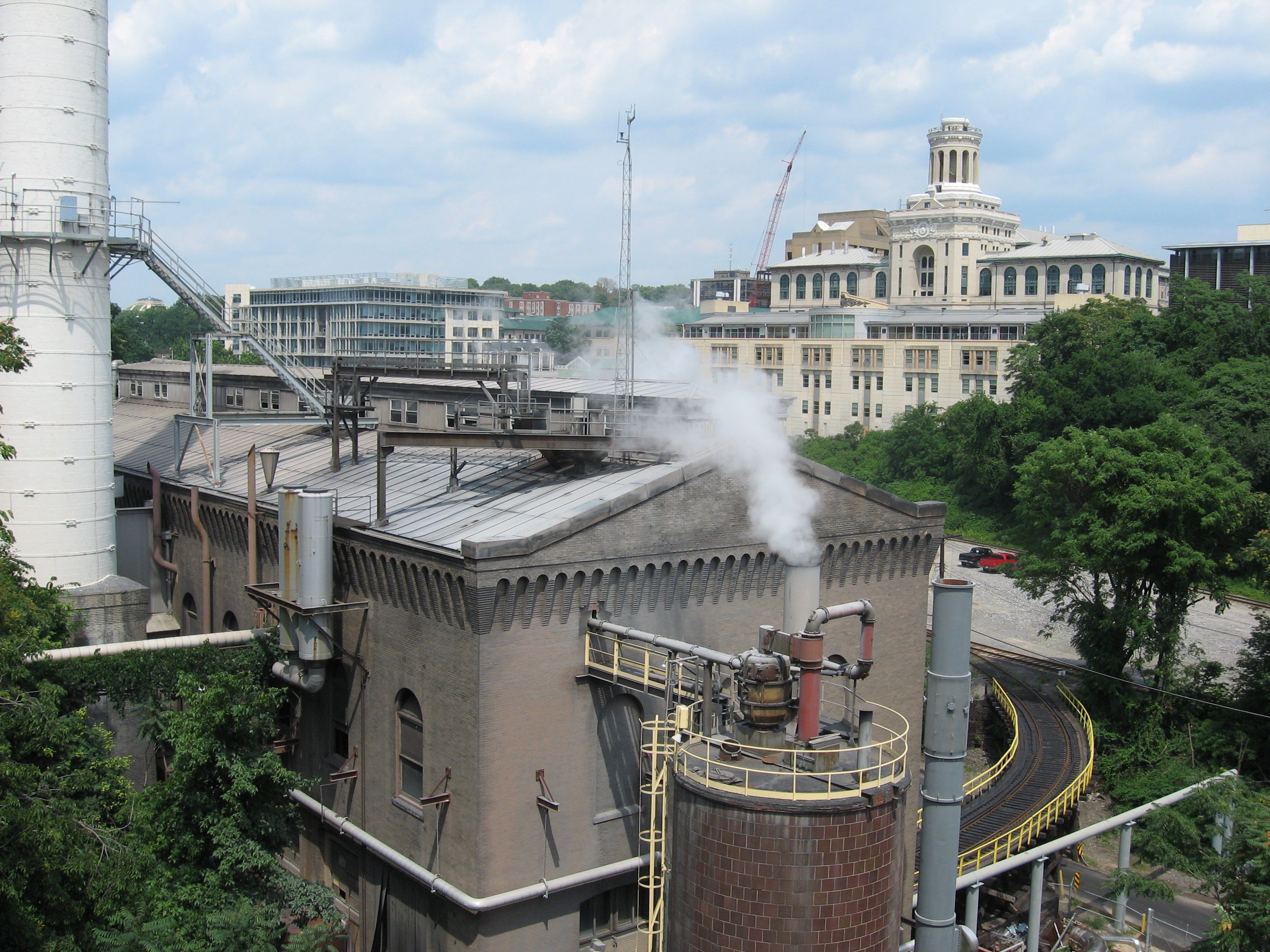
A close up of the boiler plant in 2008.

According to reporting by the Pittsburgh Post-Gazette the 2007 film The Mysteries of Pittsburgh does not use the actual Bellefield Boiler Plant, but instead uses what remains of the Carrie Furnace, a storied blast furnace that was part of US Steel's Homestead Works, a few miles south in Swissvale, Pennsylvania.

== Source of the phrase the "Cloud Factory" ==
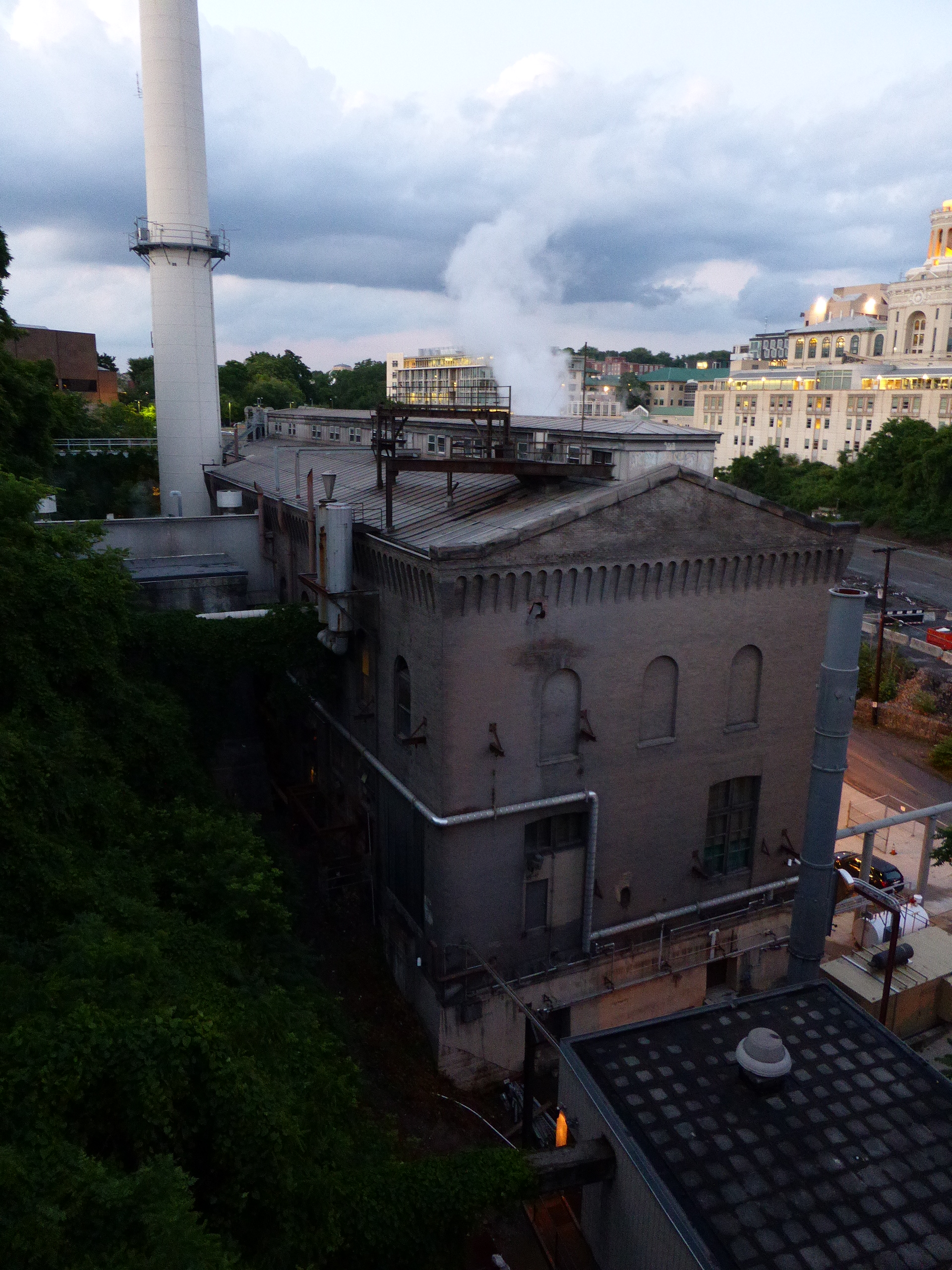
Image taken from Schenley Bridge

Chabon may have coined the name "Cloud Factory" himself, or heard it first from locals before employing it to great effect in his novel. It is also possible that he may have borrowed the phrase from Henry David Thoreau's essay Ktaadn and the Maine Woods, which was first published in five serialized installments in Sartain's Union Magazine in 1848. The piece describes a transcendental, "mountain-top" experience Thoreau had in the summer of 1846 while hiking Mount Katahdin in Maine:

Sometimes it seemed as if the summit would be cleared in a few moments, and smile in sunshine; but what was gained on one side was lost on another. It was like sitting in a chimney and waiting for the smoke to blow away. It was, in fact, a cloud factory—these were the cloud-works, and the wind turned them off done from the cool, bare rocks.
