= RZR (TV series) =

Sci-fi streaming series

- Genre: Science fiction
- Starring: David Bianchi, Mena Suvari, Danny Trejo, Richard Cabral, Emilio Rivera, Mimi Davila, Christopher Marquette
- Country of origin: United States
- Original language: English
- No. of seasons: 1
- No. of episodes: 9

Production
- Producers: Exertion Films, Gala Film

Original release
- Release: April 14, 2024 – present

RZR is an American science fiction streaming series produced by Exertion Films and Gala Film.

In 2023 at San Diego Comic-Con, it was announced that David Bianchi was the creator, co-writer, lead actor, and executive producer of the streaming series RZR.

The show premiered on the Gala Film streaming platform in 2024.

The cast includes David Bianchi, Richard Cabral, Danny Trejo, and Mena Suvari. Suvari was nominated for a Primetime Emmy Award for Outstanding Performer in a Short Form Comedy or Drama Series at the 76th Primetime Creative Arts Emmy Awards.

RZR is set in an alternate dystopian reality following the protagonist Grimm

== Cast and characters ==
- David Bianchi as Grimm
- Mena Suvari as Detective Thompson
- Danny Trejo as Manolo
- Mimi Davila as Xelsie
- Emilio Rivera as Felix De La Cruz
- Richard Cabral as Villa
- Christopher Marquette as Octie
- Setareki Wainiqolo as Cozomo

== Episodes ==
=== Season 1 (2024) ===
The first season of RZR consists of 8 episodes.

No.	Title	Original release date	Plot
1	"Dangers of Wisdom"	Apr 14, 2024	Grimm and Octie attempt a life-threatening surgery on a dangerous day in the Los Angeles Grid Zone.
2	"Chaos is the Mother of Invention"	Apr 14, 2024	Grimm and Octie decipher Grimm's latest tech while tragedy unfolds around them.
3	"The Deep End"	Apr 21, 2024	We meet Detective Thompson around a homicide while Grimm and Octie immerse themselves in Xelsies crypto-art show.
4	"God in the Machine"	Apr 28, 2024	Conspiracy builds in the Grid Zone while Grimm archives the next level of his invention.
5	"The Curse of Apollo"	May 5, 2024	Thompson has run-ins with Villa and Cozomo while Grimm heals after surgery.
6	"The Blood-Dimmed Tide"	May 12, 2024	Xelsie and Grimm connect, then Villa invades and chaos ensues, Xelsie is powerless.
7	"The Destroyer of Worlds"	May 19, 2024	Grimm is faced with a life-and-death hostage situation that ends in a blood bath.
8	"Long is the Way"	May 26, 2024	Grimm and Thompson go toe-to-toe and Xelsie faces a hard choice. Then, Grimm finds his newest and most dangerous enemy.
9	"The Making of RZR"	May 26, 2024	Take a deep dive into the making of the world of RZR. Explore the detail and craft that went into this tech-noir thriller.
