= David Bianchi =

American-Brazilian actor

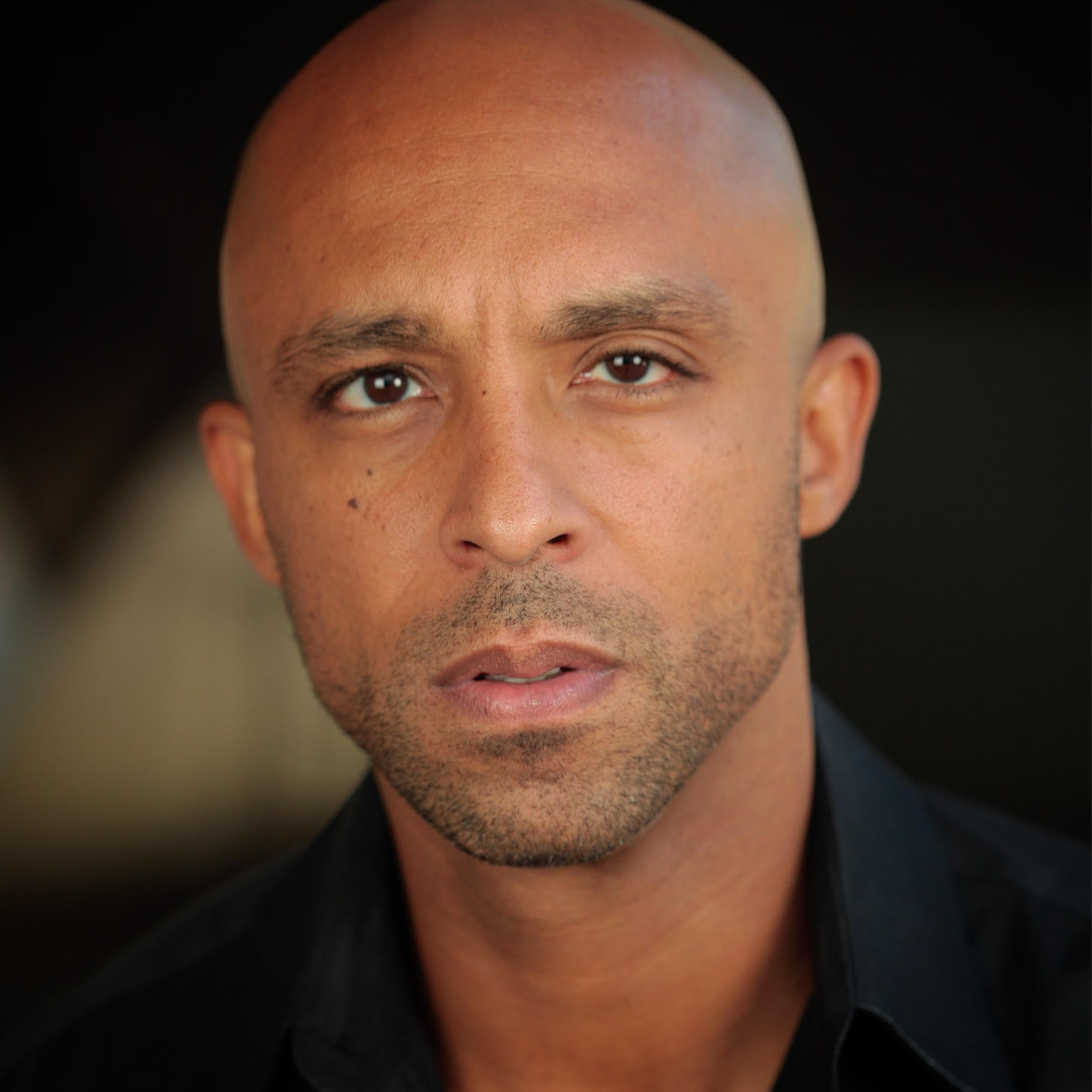
- Education: Arizona State University (BFA)
- Occupations: Actor, producer, screenwriter
- Website: davidbianchi.actor

David Bianchi is an American-Brazilian actor, producer, and screenwriter.

With over 120 professional film and television credits as an actor, he can be seen in major films and indies like Birds of Prey, Priest, and Filly Brown as well as numerous TV appearances on shows like HBO's Westworld, Unsolved, Animal Kingdom, S.W.A.T., The Last Ship, Southland, SEAL Team, and Resident Alien. He is the creator, co-writer, and executive producer of the Emmy-nominated streaming series RZR, which debuted in 2024.

== Background ==
Bianchi first appeared on stage in the third grade in Mexico City. He is classically trained with a BFA in theatre and film from Arizona State University. He is fluent in English, Spanish, and Portuguese.

Bianchi is also a painter and has exhibited his works in gallery shows in Scottsdale, Beverly Hills, and Los Angeles. In 2011, he received a congratulatory letter from the City of Los Angeles and then-Mayor Antonio Villaraigosa for his artistic endeavors in North Hollywood.

== Career ==
In 2019, he played in a recurring role on season 4 of Queen Of The South as Manny. In 2021, he played in a major recurring role of Lilo on Tyler Perry's Ruthless.

As a result of his work in front of the camera, Bianchi is an active voting member of the Academy of Television Arts and Sciences as well as being a member of the National Association of Latino Independent Producers (NALIP) and was nominated for an Imagen Award. He has 18 professional producer credits, 16 screenwriter credits and is the founder of Exertion Films. Bianchi is a member of the Producers Guild of America. He is the producer, writer, and star of All Out Dysfunktion! (Directed by Ryan LeMasters). The film co-stars Rene Rosado, Emmy-winner Vincent De Paul, Gerry Bednob, and Geraldine Viswanathan. Bianchi was the executive producer of the film Her Name Was Jo.

Bianchi is currently in post-production on Catalyst (directed by Christopher Folkens). He stars with action star Patrick Kilpatrick, Michael Roark, and Noel Gugliemi. This is his fifth feature film as a producer. He also appeared in Birds of Prey, a Harley Quinn film, starring Margot Robbie and Ewan McGregor in 2020.

He is a Spoken Word poet with TV appearances on two seasons of the NAACP Award-nominated show Verses and Flow. Bianchi produces spoken word films collaborating with others in the field including Mustafa Shakir, Joivan Wade and Emmy-nominated, Grammy Award-winning actor/poet Malcolm Jamal Warner. Bianchi coined the term spinema or "spinning cinema" through spoken word, which he describes as high concept cinematic experimental films told entirely in spoken word poetry addressing socially-conscious themes.

In 2020, his poetic short film I Can't Breathe was broadcast as part of the Emmy-nominated KTLA series Breaking Bias. The work sold on the NFT platform Ephimera raising over $10,000 for the George Floyd Memorial Foundation, becoming the first spoken word film non-fungible token. His work, Wade in the Water, was named best short film for 2021 by Film Threat Magazine Award This!

In 2023 at San Diego Comic-Con, it was announced that Bianchi is the creator, co-writer, and executive producer of the streaming series RZR. The series debuted in April 2024 on Gala Film. He portrayed the lead character Grimm and the cast also included Richard Cabral, Danny Trejo, and Mena Suvari. The series received a Primetime Emmy Award nomination.

== Selected filmography ==
=== Film ===
Year	Title	Role	Notes
2004	Portrait	Photographer	Short
2005	And I Lived	Jered	
2005	Trickery of Travelers	Salesman	Short
2005	Dinner for One	Nick	Short
2005	The Idealist	Donnie	Short
2006	Soldier	Soldier	
2006	Pop Star	Manager	Short
2006	Independence Day	Ken	Short
2007	Farewell Darkness	Dougie	
2008	Chinaman's Chance: America's Other Slaves	Posse Leader	
2008	The Incredible Hulk	-	
2009	A Night with Amanda	Thomas	Short
2009	Miss Ohio	Scott	Short
2010	Our Vows	Kevin	Short
2010	I Want Him Dead	Kalvin	Short
2010	Cheating	Mark	Short
2011	Susan's Remembrance	Thomas	Short
2011	Priest	Familiar	
2011	Politics of Love	-	
2012	Filly Brown	Delivery Man	
2012	Silver Case	Familiar	
2012	Malachi IX	Junior Ruhs	Short
2013	Enter the Dangerous Mind	Officer Daniels	
2013	The Dark Side of the Earth	Parker	Short
2013	Five Thirteen	Afrika	
2013	1982	Officer Johnson	
2013	Well Played	Coach Alex	Short
2014	Crossroads	David	
2014	Break the Bars	Poet	Short
2014	Hush	Cop	Short
2015	Moxie	Terraance	Short
2015	Marathon Day	Poet	Short
2015	The Prison Web	Slick	Short
2016	All Out Dysfunktion!	Tyrell	
2016	Destined	Arturo	
2016	A Christmas in Vermont	Bart	TV movie
2016	The Bounce Back	Hotlanta Host	
2017	Blood, Sweat & Years	Officer Martinez	Short
2017	You Can't Hear Me	The Prisoner	Short
2017	McDick	Everett Kahn	
2018	A Boy. A Girl. A Dream.	David	
2019	Evergreen	Dylan	
2019	Your Family or Your Life	Detective Jansen	
2019	Foster Boy	Officer Smith	
2020	Birds of Prey	Sionis Henchman #1	
2020	Let's Grow	John Black	Short
2020	Wade in the Water	David	Short
2021	Calm Before	Isaac	
2021	Lazarus	Gabriel	
2021	Adelante	David	Short
2022	Catalyst	Castor Ramirez	Writer

=== Television ===
Year	Title	Role	Notes
2003	Style Court	Guest Plaintiff	Episode: "Episode #2.28"
2006	General Hospital	Airline Attendant	Episode: "Episode #1.11047"
2007	American Heiress	Guard	Episode: "Trials by Fire" & "The Truth Hurts"
2012	America's Most Wanted	John Figueroa	Episode: "John Figueroa"
2012	M.A.S.H.	Jacob	Episode: "Sell a Bit More"
2013	Southland	Glen	Episode: "Off Duty"
2013	Sex Pose Man	Winston	Main cast
2013	A-Holes Anonymous	James	Episode: "Helping You Help Yourself"
2016	Pretty Little Liars	Bartender	Episode: "Hit and Run, Run, Run"
2016	Days of Our Lives	Worker #1	Episode: "Episode #1.12765"
2016	The Last Ship	Dad	Episode: "Don't Look Back"
2017	Pretty Little Liars	Bartender	Episode: "In the Eye Abides the Heart"
2018	Unsolved	Sean Melindo	Episode: "Tupac Amaru Shakur"
2018	Westworld	PMC #3	Episode: "Les Écorchés"
2018	Animal Kingdom	Tail	Episode: "Wolves"
2018	Shooter	Security Guard Shemky	Episode: "Orientation Day"
2019	MacGyver	Oscar	Episode: "Friends + Enemies + Border"
2019	Queen Of The South	Manny	Recurring cast: season 4
2019	Insatiable	Paco	Recurring cast: season 2
2020	Agents of S.H.I.E.L.D.	Javier	Episode: "After, Before"
2020-21	Ruthless	Lilo	Recurring cast
2021	S.W.A.T.	Collins	Episode: "Sins of the Fathers"
2021	SEAL Team	Alpha OIC Pete	Recurring cast: season 4
2021	True Story	Ray	Episode: "Chapter 5: Hard Feelings"
2022	Resident Alien	Goliath	Recurring cast: season 2
2022	NCIS	Kyle Jennings	Episode: "Starting Over"
2022	NCIS: Hawaiʻi	Kyle Jennings	Episode: "T'N'T"
2022	Criminal Minds	Deputy Kevin Henson	Episode: "Just Getting Started"
2023	The Rookie	Wyatt	Recurring cast: season 5
2024	RZR	Grimm	Main cast (Creator; Co-writer; Producer)

=== Video games ===
Year	Title	Role	Notes
2007	The Darkness	Civilian/Lucas Hellinger (voice)	
2024	Cyberpunk 2077	Various (voice)	
