= Haunting of the Mary Celeste =

- Official release poster
- Directed by: Shana Betz
- Written by: David Ross
- Story by: David Ross; Jerome Oliver
- Produced by: Brian Dreyfuss; Norman Dreyfuss; Justin Ambrosino
- Starring: Emily Swallow; Dominic DeVore; Alice Hunter; Pierre Adele; Richard Roundtree
- Cinematography: Raquel Fernández Nuñez
- Edited by: Danny Daneau; Cris Mertens
- Music by: Alex Ruger
- Production company: Featured Artists Agency
- Distributed by: Vertical Entertainment
- Release date: October 23, 2020 (United States)
- Country: United States
- Language: English

Haunting of the Mary Celeste is a 2020 American horror thriller film directed by Shana Betz with a script from David Ross and Jerome Oliver. It stars Emily Swallow, Richard Roundtree, Ava Acres, Pierre Adele, Dominic DeVore, and Alice Hunter.

It was released on October 23, 2020, by Vertical Entertainment.

== Premise ==
Concerned researcher Rachael and her team have set out to sea on a merchant ship to prove that a family and crew disappeared from it for supernatural reasons. When the boat breaks down and her crew begins to vanish one by one, her theory proves true that the boat contains a rift between dimensions.

== Cast ==
- Emily Swallow as Rachel
- Richard Roundtree as Tulls
- Ava Acres as Jennifer / Sophia
- Pierre Adele as Aldo
- Dominic DeVore as Grant
- Alice Hunter as Cassandra

== Reception ==
Canadian film critic Richard Crouse rated the film at 2 stars, writing that "With characters straight out of Central Casting, the gruff old sea captain, the hot headed assistant etc, it offers up a soggy sea-bound adventure with very few actual thrills." Jackie K. Cooper was similarly critical.

Tom Chang of Bleeding Cool panned the movie, stating "The jump scares are nothing remarkable, and Swallow and Roundtree's performances drive much of the film's tension as opposed to its supernatural elements."
