= The Minute You Wake Up Dead =

2022 American film

- Directed by: Michael Mailer
- Written by: Timothy Holland; Michael Mailer
- Produced by: Andrew Stevens
- Starring: Cole Hauser; Morgan Freeman; Jaimie Alexander
- Cinematography: Adam Biddle
- Edited by: Michael Kuge
- Music by: David Wurst; Eric Wurst
- Production companies: Grindstone Entertainment Group; Andrew Stevens Entertainment; Milestone Studios
- Distributed by: Lionsgate
- Release date: November 4, 2022
- Running time: 90 minutes
- Country: United States
- Language: English

The Minute You Wake Up Dead is a 2022 American noir thriller film directed by Michael Mailer and starring Cole Hauser, Morgan Freeman and Jaimie Alexander.

== Plot ==
Stockbroker Russ has recently returned to his childhood home, Bare Hollow, Mississippi. Residents have made money from his stock advice, but his latest advice regarding a merger deal does not come through, costing many their savings.

He is renting the house next door to local waitress Delaine, who he had a crush on in high school. They start a sexual relationship.

Local petty criminal Lucius murders Delaine's father, who is battling cancer. Despite her feigned sadness, Delaine has deceived Lucius into a sexual relationship, and had him kill her father for the $550,000 life insurance settlement.

Sheriff Fowler's investigation quickly leads him to Lucius, so Delaine kills her hapless lover – her second murder. Lucius had planned to use his share of the money to pay off local loan shark Jody, and told Jody everything about the murder after his thug Mace cuts off his toe. When Lucius dies, Jody informs Delaine that she must pay Lucius' debt.

Lucius' body goes missing, and Delaine later finds that Russ has it. He reveals that he overheard Delaine and Russ discussing their crime, and he hid Lucius so that he could protect her from getting caught, and thus become her new equal partner in the insurance settlement. He also reveals that he has killed Fowler for getting too close to solving the original murder. She tells Russ that her father was in pain awaiting his death from stage four cancer, but knew that suicide nullifies his insurance, so he and Delaine staged his murder to swindle the insurance company.

Delaine kills Russ, her third murder, and throws his and Lucius' bodies in the swamp. When they are found the next day, Deputy Sheriff Kane accuses Delaine of being involved, and says he will find the proof. Minutes later Pernie, the secretary for Russ, tells Delaine that Russ told her everything, and demands she now become an equal partner in the insurance fraud. Jody and his thug Mace are still bothering Delaine for the debt Lucius owes, so she arranges for Pernie to murder them both that night, and Delaine murders Pernie the next morning, bringing the death toll to seven in her insurance fraud scheme.

Later that morning, Kane arrests Delaine, and is shocked when she confesses everything – against his original Miranda warning and his follow up suggestion that she shut up – confirming the intelligence of a fraudster mass-murdering waitress in Bare Hollow, Mississippi.

== Cast ==
- Cole Hauser as Russ Potter
- Jaimie Alexander as Delaine Moore
- Darren Mann as Lucius McFalls
- Morgan Freeman as Sheriff Thurmond Fowler
- Benjamin Vandermey as Deputy Kane
- Tony DeMil as Jody
- John Dylan Atkins as Mace
- Liann Pattison as Purnie Cannon
- Andrew Stevens as Dewey

== Production ==
In February 2022, Cole Hauser, Morgan Freeman and Jaimie Alexander were confirmed as starring in the film.

Filming began in Mississippi in February 2022.

In May 2022, it was announced that Grindstone Entertainment would be distributing the film in North America.

== Release ==
The film was released in theaters, on demand and digital platforms on November 4, 2022 and was released on DVD and Blu-ray December 13, 2022.

== Reception ==
=== Critical response ===
On the review aggregator website Rotten Tomatoes, 0% of 9 critics' reviews are positive, with an average rating of 2.7/10.

On The Guardian, Cath Clarke rated it 1/5 stars writing that "any minute you spend with this shonky thriller is likely to feel about 60 seconds too long: gone for ever, never to be clawed back."

=== Box office ===
Primarily a direct-to-video release, The Minute You Wake Up Dead had a very limited theatrical release, grossing $35,162 at the box office.
