= The Opposite Sex (2014 film) =

- Directed by: Jennifer Finnigan; Jonathan Silverman
- Written by: Mark Mussina; Steven Sessions
- Produced by: Jennifer Finnigan; Gino Pereira; Claire Severance; Jonathan Silverman; Chad A. Verdi
- Starring: Mena Suvari; Eric Roberts; Kristin Chenoweth
- Cinematography: Jendra Jarnagin
- Edited by: Keith Croket
- Music by: Eric Masunaga
- Distributed by: Cinedigm Entertainment Group
- Release dates: October 22, 2014 (Finland); May 21, 2015 (United States)
- Running time: 97 minutes
- Country: United States
- Language: English

The Opposite Sex, also known under the working title of A Bet's A Bet, is a 2014 small-budget indie film that was directed by Jennifer Finnigan and Jonathan Silverman, and is their co-directorial debut. It was released to Blu-ray on October 22, 2014, in Sweden and Finland and received a United States release on May 21, 2015. The film was also released to theaters overseas as Poskromić Playboya. The film stars Kristin Chenoweth, Mena Suvari, Eric Roberts, Jennifer Finnigan, and Geoff Stults.

== Synopsis ==
Vince (Geoff Stults) is a successful, driven divorce attorney who is a notorious womanizer, having affairs with his clients. He is intrigued, however, when he meets the competitive Jane (Mena Suvari), a young divorcee who resents men. The two agree to a series of bets where the winner decides the fate of the loser. Neither expects to fall in love.

== Cast ==
- Geoff Stults as Vince
- Mena Suvari as Jane
- Kristin Chenoweth as Mrs. Kemp
- Josh Hopkins as Kenny
- Jennifer Finnigan as Stephanie
- Josh Cooke as Kendrick
- Eric Roberts as Mr. Campbell
- Dana Ashbrook as Gary
- Debra Jo Rupp as Tracy
- Jonathan Silverman as Tom
- Kenan Thompson as Mitch
- Julie Ann Dawson as Hot Club Girl
- Jennifer Jostyn as Regina
- Bridget Everett as Stella
- Jackie Moore as Madison
- Joey Fatone as Emcee
- Maria Kanellis as Hot Mess

== Reception ==
StarPulse rated the film favorably, writing "Light, fluffy, but also very witty in its writing, "A Bet's A Bet" is harmless enjoyable fun fare." Interia Film heavily criticized the film, as they felt that there was no chemistry between its lead stars and that the film's comedy was outdated.
