= Darren Mann =

Canadian actor (born 1989)

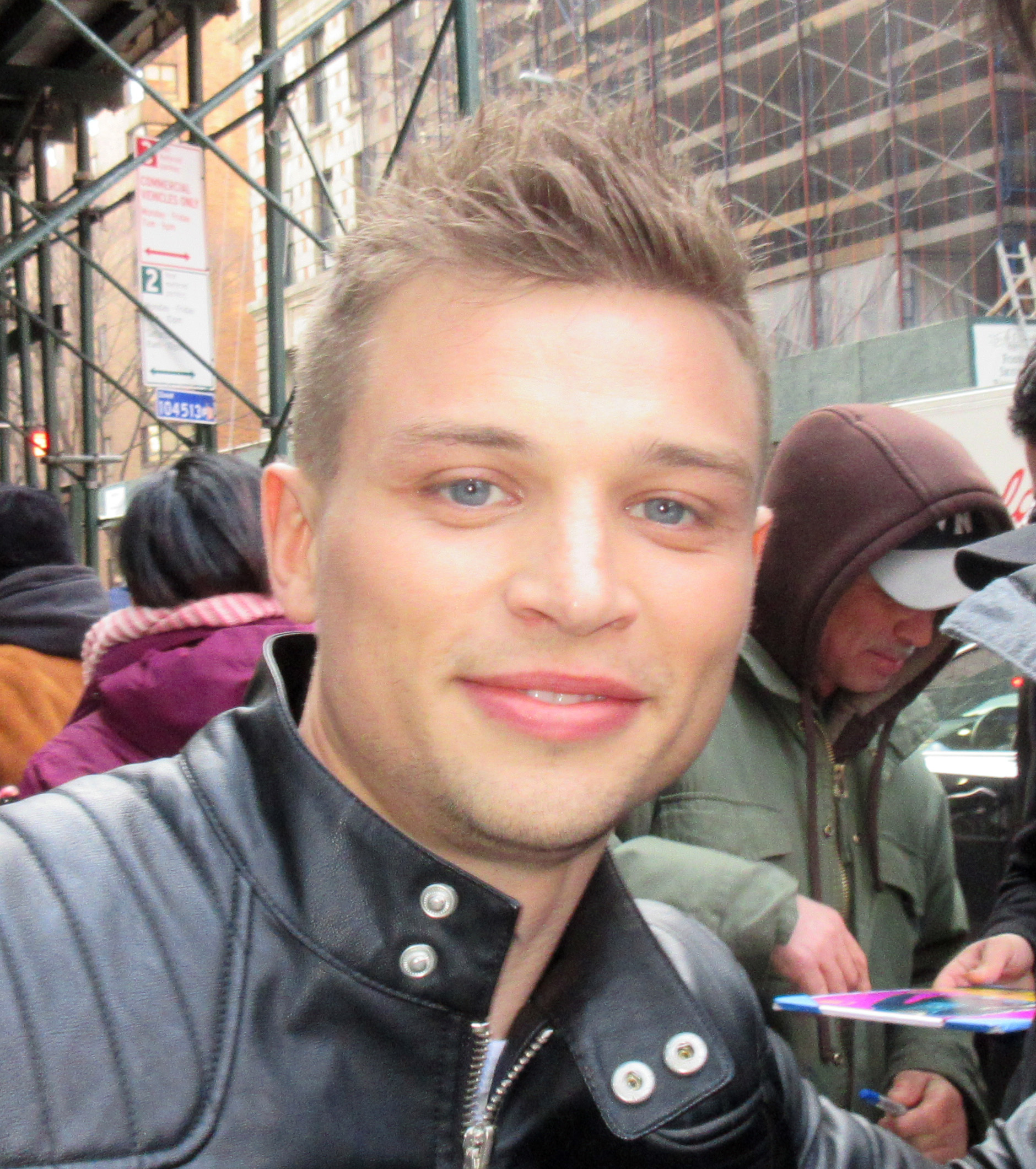
- Born: May 4, 1989 (age 37); Vancouver, British Columbia, Canada
- Occupation: Actor
- Years active: 2013–present

Darren Mann (born May 4, 1989) is a Canadian actor. He portrayed Ballas Kohl in the 2018 film Giant Little Ones. He also portrayed Jett in the 2020 film Embattled. His performance in the former film won him a Leo Award. On television, he was Luke Chalfant in Netflix's Chilling Adventures of Sabrina and Jack Dutton in Paramount+'s 1923.

He appeared opposite Morgan Freeman in the 2022 film The Minute You Wake Up Dead.

== Personal life ==
Mann is from East Vancouver. He was born to mother Lenore Mann and has a brother, Tyler.

Inspired by his actress/director mother, Mann started acting in Vancouver at the age of 8. He quickly landed roles on stage and in film. However, it was his passion for hockey that made Mann take a break from acting. Mann quickly climbed the ranks becoming a junior-level star, before turning professional. Eventually injuries would force him to retire which would lead him to return to acting.

== Filmography ==
=== Film ===
Year	Title	Role	Notes
2015	Even Lambs Have Teeth	Travis	
2016	Hello Destroyer	Brendan Schultz	
2018	Giant Little Ones	Ballas Kohl	
2020	Embattled	Jett Boykins	
2022	The Minute You Wake Up Dead	Lucius	
2022	Twisted Blues	Vladimir	
2023	Breakwater	Dovey	
2026	How We Stand		

=== Television ===
Year	Title	Role	Notes
2013	The Tomorrow People	Stoner	Episode: "Limbo"
2014	Motive	Max Vaughn	Episode: "Pitfall"
2014	Package Deal	Jordan	Episode: "The Imperfect Storm"
2014–2015	The 100	Kid #1 / Chivalrous Boy #3 / Dying Kid #2	3 episodes
2015	Some Assembly Required	Prince Mel	Episode: "Flurf"
2015	iZombie	Senior Boy	Episode: "Maternity Liv"
2015	Supernatural	J.J. McKinley	Episode: "Brother's Keeper"
2016	Girlfriends' Guide to Divorce	Kip	Episode: "Rule #81: There's No Crying in Porn"
2016	Wayward Pines	Kyle	3 episodes
2016	Ice	Kenny	Episode: "Hyenas"
2017	Imposters	Danny	Episode: "Always Forward, Never Back"
2017	House of the Witch	Shane Reynolds	TV movie
2017	Van Helsing	Ryan	2 episodes
2018–2019	Chilling Adventures of Sabrina	Lucas "Luke" Chalfant	9 episodes
2019	Project Blue Book	Billy	Episode: "Foo Fighters"
2020	Fortunate Son	Travis Hunter	Limited Series
2022	Animal Kingdom	young Barry "Baz" Blackwell	12 episodes
2022–25	1923	Jack Dutton	Main role
