= Sex and Lies in Sin City =

2008 American television film

- Also known as: Sex and Lies in Sin City: The Ted Binion Scandal
- Written by: Teena Booth
- Directed by: Peter Medak
- Starring: Mena Suvari; Marcia Gay Harden; Johnathon Schaech; Matthew Modine
- Composer: Edward Shearmur
- Country of origin: United States
- Original language: English

Production
- Executive producer: Frank Konigsberg
- Producers: Sandra Nebel; David A. Rosemont
- Cinematography: Anthony B. Richmond
- Editor: Richard Nord
- Running time: 95 minutes
- Production companies: Lifetime Movie Network; Sony Pictures Television

Original release
- Network: Lifetime
- Release: 2008

Sex and Lies in Sin City: The Ted Binion Scandal is a 2008 Lifetime Television film starring Johnathon Schaech, Marcia Gay Harden, Matthew Modine, and Mena Suvari.

== Premise ==
The film details the events surrounding the death of Las Vegas casino owner Ted Binion. It follows the ensuing investigation of Binion's life and the people in it, such as Binion's sister Becky, his girlfriend Sandy Murphy, and Sandy's lover Rick Tabish.

== Cast ==
- Matthew Modine as Ted Binion
- Mena Suvari as Sandy Murphy
- Marcia Gay Harden as Becky Binion
- Johnathon Schaech as Rick Tabish
- Chris Ashworth as Frank Lipjanic
- Peter Haskell as Ian Miller
