= Emilio Rivera =

American actor

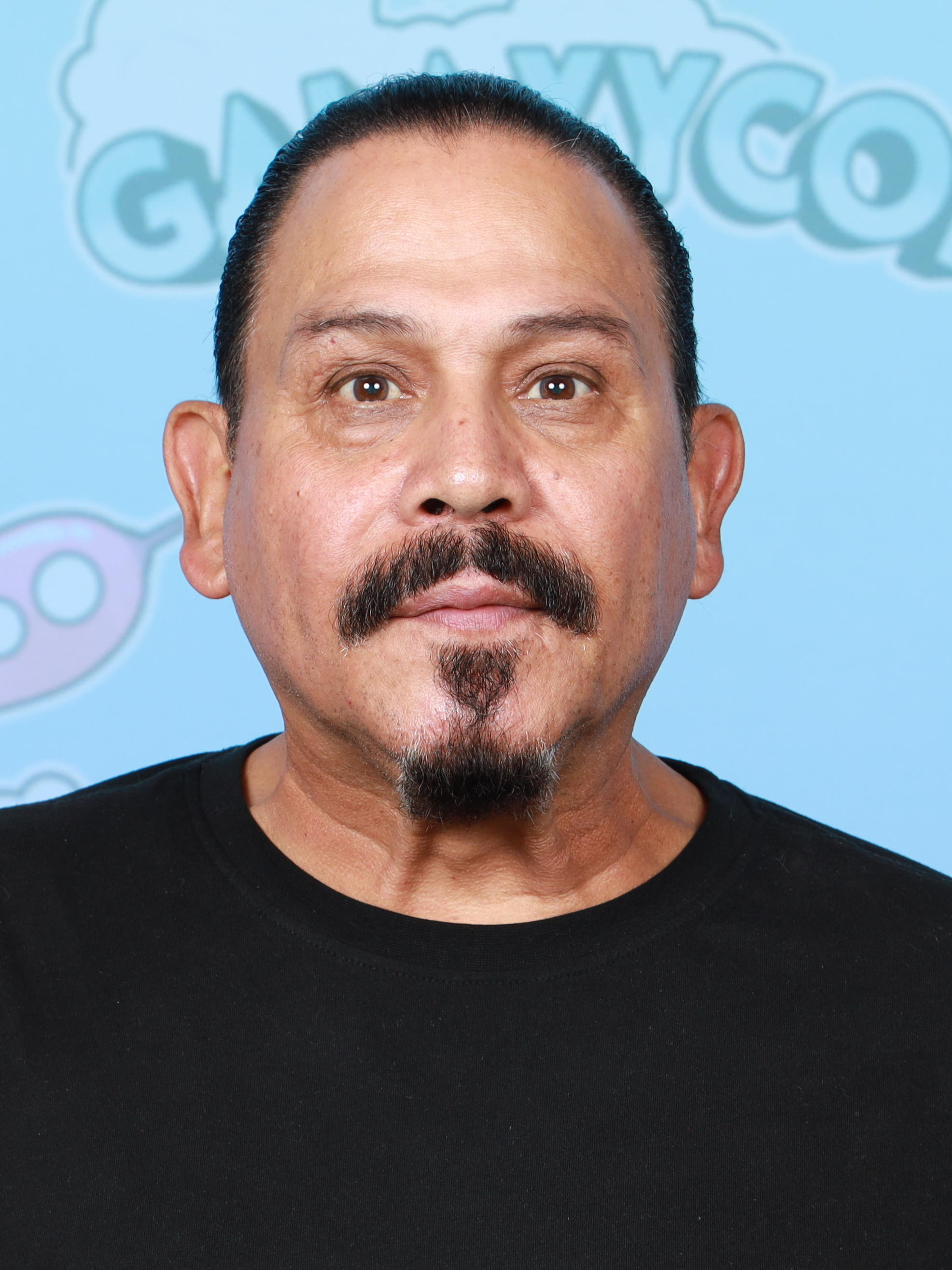
- Rivera at GalaxyCon San Jose in 2025
- Born: San Antonio, Texas, U.S.
- Occupations: Actor, stand-up comedian
- Years active: 1992–present
- Spouse: Yadi Valerio (m. 2009)
- Children: 3

Emilio Rivera is an American film and television actor and stand-up comedian. He is best known for his portrayal of Marcus Álvarez in Sons of Anarchy and its spin-off, Mayans M.C. He is also known for his depiction of criminals and law enforcement officers.

== Early life ==
Rivera is of Mexican descent. He is the oldest sibling in his family, with four younger brothers and three younger sisters. He was raised in Elysian Valley also known as Frogtown, a neighborhood of Los Angeles, California.

Rivera suffered from stuttering as a youth. In the third grade, he was cast as the titular character in a school theatre production of Rumpelstiltskin. Rivera noticed he did not stutter once during his performance on stage. Shortly after, he confessed to his father he wanted to be an actor, to which his father replied that acting was only for "rich white people."

At 18 years old in 1979, Rivera enlisted in the U.S. Army.

== Career ==
Rivera's first feature role was in the TV series Renegade with Lorenzo Lamas. He also had a role in the feature film Con Air, co-starring Nicolas Cage. Emilio has appeared in several commercials, television programs and feature films including Training Day, Fun with Dick and Jane, Traffic, The Cable Guy, NYPD Blue, Beverly Hills, 90210, Walker, Texas Ranger, Titus, Hitman: Agent 47, JAG, ER, A Man Apart with Vin Diesel, John Cusack's film Never Get Outta the Boat, Ali G Indahouse, Rush, Howard Stern's Son of the Beach, Law and Order: Special Victims Unit, Z Nation, and Michael Mann's new series Metro. He also played Marcus Álvarez in Sons of Anarchy for seven seasons and played Álvarez in Mayans M.C. for 5 seasons.

== Personal life ==
Emilio has three children from a previous marriage and his oldest child from another woman.

== Filmography ==
=== Film ===
Year	Title	Role	Notes
1995	My Family	Tamalito	
1995	Murder Was the Case	Reporter #2	
1995	Rage	Javier	
1995	Extreme Blue	Matulo	TV movie
1995	Donor Unknown	Emilio	TV movie
1996	The Cable Guy	Jail Inmate	
1997	Con Air	Carlos	
1999	Pros & Cons	Con #1	
2000	Guilty as Charged	Private Alberto Ramirerz	TV movie
2000	Traffic	Salazar Soldier #2	
2001	Tomcats	Sampson	
2002	Road Dogz	Joe "Big Joe"	
2002	Ali G Indahouse	Rico	
2002	High Crimes	Salvadoran Man	
2002	Never Get Outta the Boat	Angel	
2002	Confessions of a Dangerous Mind	Benitez	
2002	R.U.S./H.	"Stick" Sandoval	TV movie
2003	A Man Apart	Garza	
2003	Bruce Almighty	Hood	
2003	El Matador	"Chuy"	
2004	Party Animalz	Uncle Hector	Video
2004	Cake	Fidel	Video
2004	Collateral	Paco	
2004	El Padrino	Rudy	
2004	Sucker Free City	Detective Zepada	TV movie
2004	Doing Hard Time	Officer David Teal	Video
2005	Y nada más	Lalo	Short
2005	Harsh Times	Eddy	
2005	Fun with Dick and Jane	Day Laborer	
2005	Short Fuse	Camacho	
2005	Purple Heart	Deputy	
2006	Splinter	Jesse (Veterano)	
2007	The Dead One	"Coyote"	
2007	Spider-Man 3	Policeman At Sand Truck	
2007	The Gift: Life Unwrapped	Father Romero	
2007	Delta Farce	Jorge	
2008	The Third Nail	Martin	
2008	Strange Wilderness	Border Guard	
2008	Street Kings	O.G. Vato	
2009	Next Day Air	"Bodega"	
2009	Otis E.	The Drunk	
2009	Tom Cool	Actor	
2010	Lean Like a Cholo	Paisa	
2010	Food Stamps	Benny "Bible Benny"	
2010	Broken	Carlos	
2010	American Flyer	"Big Boss"	
2011	Cinema Verite	Nightwatchman	TV movie
2011	Platinum Illusions	"Boss Hog"	
2011	Budz House	"Big Happy"	
2011	Narcocorrido	Ramon	Short
2012	Filly Brown	Mani	
2012	Act of Valor	Sanchez	
2012	Vaseline	Mr. Chumpero	Short
2012	C'mon Man	Steven	
2012	The Obama Effect	Hector Santiago	
2012	Devils Inside	Mob Boss	
2013	The Devil's in the Details	Bill Duffy	
2013	Water & Power	Norte / Sur	
2014	Bullet	"Speedy"	
2014	10 Cent Pistol	Melville	
2014	Cry of the Butterfly	Jose	
2014	Sins of the Father	Ramon	Short
2015	Mercy For Angels	Machetto	
2015	Hitman: Agent 47	Fabian	
2015	Street Level	Pete	
2016	North by El Norte	"Big Boss"	
2016	Better Criminal	Clavo Lopez	
2016	48 Hours to Live	Gunner	
2017	Badsville	Lou "Lucky Lou"	
2017	Smartass	Poco Efe	
2017	Avenge the Crows	Carlos Santiago	
2017	El Camino Christmas	Vicente Santos	
2017	Shadow of the Gun	Captain Morales	
2018	Lawless Range	Miguel Flores	
2018	Fade Away	Mr. Salvatore	
2018	Don't Worry, He Won't Get Far on Foot	Jesus Alvarado	
2018	El Chicano	"Shadow"	
2018	Venom	Lobby Guard Richard	
2019	3 from Hell	Francisco "Aquarius" Mendoza Chavez	
2020	Ride Hard: Live Free	"Gauge"	
2021	Welcome to Our World	Benny "Bible Benny"	
2023	Flamin' Hot	Vacho Montañez	
2024	Holy Cash	James	
2025	Under Fire	Valentino	

=== Television ===
Year	Title	Role	Notes
1992	Renegade	Rafe	Episode: "Payback"
1993	The Adventures of Brisco County, Jr.	Federale	Episode: "Brisco in Jalisco"
1995	Beverly Hills, 90210	Felipe	Episode: "Hazardous to Your Health"
1995	Unsolved Mysteries	Tony Castro	Episode: "Episode #8.1"
1996	JAG	Drug Runner	Episode: "Sightings"
1996–1997	The Bold and the Beautiful	Lucien Cortéz	Regular Cast
1997–1999	L.A. Heat	Officer Miller	Guest Cast: Season 1–2
1998	Soldier of Fortune, Inc.	Hector	Episode: "Déja Vu" & "Apres Vu"
1998	Walker, Texas Ranger	Juan "Loco" Morales	Episode: "Test of Faith"
1998	NYPD Blue	Galvez	Episode: "Don't Kill the Messenger"
1999	The Young and the Restless	Boat Captain	Episode: "Episode #1.6579" & "#1.6583"
2000	The X Files	Brigham	Episode: "Orison"
2001	NYPD Blue	Hector	Episode: "Waking Up Is Hard to Do"
2001	ER	Emilio Cardazco	Episode: "Start All Over Again"
2001	Titus	Castro	Episode: "Racing in the Streets"
2002	Son of the Beach	"Dirty" Sanchez	Episode: "Penetration Island" & "Saturday Night Queefer"
2002–2003	Robbery Homicide Division	Juan Tiant	Recurring Cast
2003	The Young and the Restless	Ruffian	Episode: "Episode #1.7553"
2003	The Shield	Navaro Quintero	Episode: "The Quick Fix" & "Greenlit"
2003	CSI: Crime Scene Investigation	Bank Robber #1	Episode: "Inside the Box"
2005	Kojak	Diaz "The King"	Recurring Cast
2006	Bones	Ramon Ortez	Episode: "The Woman in the Garden"
2006	Shark	Detective #1	Episode: "Pilot"
2006	My Name Is Earl	Bandit #1	Episode: "South of the Border: Part Uno & Part Dos"
2007	Brothers & Sisters	The Sponsor	Episode: "The Other Walker"
2007	Raines	"Coyote"	Episode: "Meet Juan Doe"
2007	Girlfriends	Nick	Episode: "Deck the Halls with Bags and Folly"
2008	Moonlight	Chemma Tejada	Episode: "Love Lasts Forever"
2008	Weeds	"El Coyote"	Recurring Cast: Season 4
2008	Terminator: The Sarah Connor Chronicles	Mexican Police Chief	Episode: "Mr. Ferguson Is Ill Today"
2008–2014	Sons of Anarchy	Marcus Álvarez	Recurring Cast: Season 1–4 & 7, Guest: Season 5–6
2009	CSI: NY	Stevie "Little Stevie"	Episode: "Point of No Return"
2009	Lie to Me	Tony Calvo	Episode: "Blinded"
2010	General Hospital	Santos Lopez	Episode: "Episode #1.12125" & "#1.12126"
2011	Southland	Luis Reyes	Episode: "Let It Snow"
2011	The Mentalist	Martin	Episode: "The Redshirt"
2013	Law & Order: Special Victims Unit	Benito Escobar	Episode: "Poisoned Motive"
2013–2014	Kroll Show	Various Characters	Guest Cast: Season 1–2
2014	Gang Related	Tio Gordo	Recurring Cast
2014–2017	Hand of God	Sergeant Kessler	Recurring Cast
2015–2016	Z Nation	Hector "Escorpion" Alvarez	Main Cast: Season 2-3
2016	The Night Shift	Jorge	Episode: "The Way Back"
2016	TripTank	Spanish Operator/Henchman #1 (voice)	Episode: "Sick Day" & "Brain Virus"
2017	Saints & Sinners	Officer Francisco Cooper	Recurring Cast: Season 2
2018–2021	On My Block	Chivo	Recurring Cast: Season 1-2 & 4, Guest: Season 3
2018–2023	Mayans M.C.	Marcus Álvarez	Recurring Cast: Season 1, Main Cast: Season 2–5
2018–2024	The Family Business	Alejandro Zuniga	Main Cast: Season 1-3, Guest: Season 4, Recurring Cast: Season 5
2021	Celebrity Family Feud	Himself / Celebrity Player	Episode: "Episode #8.3"
2022	The Garcias	Shaman	Episode: "The Compromise"
2024	The Upshaws	Barkavious	Episode: "Hail Mary"
2024	RZR	Felix De La Cruz	Recurring Cast
2024	Landman	Luis Medina	Episode: "Landman"

=== Music videos ===
Year	Title	Artist	Role
2004	"Got It Twisted"	Mobb Deep	Rival Gang Boss
2005	"Just a Lil Bit"	50 Cent	Rival Gangster
2013	"High School"	Nicki Minaj featuring Lil Wayne	"El Jefe"
2021	"Overpass Graffiti"	Ed Sheeran	Cameo Bike Gang Member
