= Mena Suvari =

American actress (born 1979)

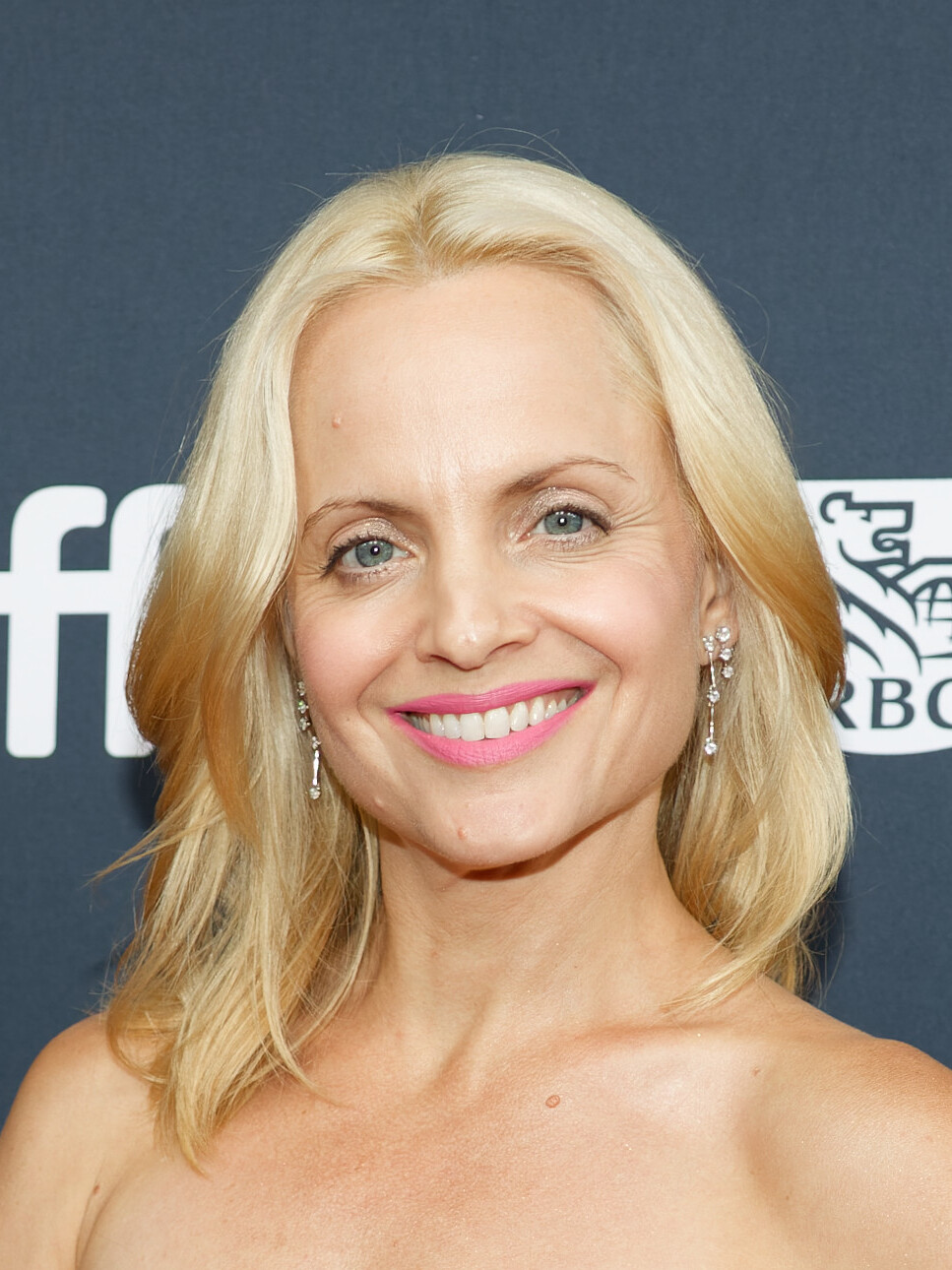
- Suvari in 2024
- Born: Mena Alexandra Suvari; February 13, 1979 (age 47); Newport, Rhode Island, U.S.
- Occupations: Actress; producer; fashion designer; model
- Years active: 1995–present
- Spouses: Robert Brinkmann (m. 2000; div. 2005); Simone Sestito (m. 2010; div. 2012); Michael Hope (m. 2018)
- Children: 1

Mena Alexandra Suvari (/ˈmiːnə səˈvɑːri/; born February 13, 1979) is an American actress, producer, fashion designer, and model.

Suvari made her film debut in the 1997 black comedy drama Nowhere. She rose to international prominence with her appearances as Angela in the critically acclaimed comedy-drama American Beauty (1999), for which she received a BAFTA nomination for Best Supporting Actress, and Heather in three of the American Pie films (1999–2001, 2012). Her other notable film roles include Slums of Beverly Hills (1998), Loser (2000), Sugar & Spice (2001), Spun (2003), Rumor Has It... (2005), Stuck (2007), and Day of the Dead (2008).

For her main role as Detective Thompson on the Gala Film short-form series RZR (2024), Suvari was nominated for the Primetime Emmy Award for Outstanding Performer in a Short Form Comedy or Drama Series. On television, Suvari played recurring roles as Edie on the fourth season of the HBO drama series Six Feet Under (2004), for which she earned a Screen Actors Guild nomination, Isabella on the second season of Chicago Fire (2013), and Elizabeth Short in the anthology series American Horror Story: Murder House (2011), reprising the role in American Horror Story: Apocalypse (2018) and American Horror Story: 13 (2026).

Suvari has been a model for Lancôme cosmetics and print ads for Lancôme Paris Adaptîve, as well as a long-time supporter and activist for the Starlight Children's Foundation and the African Medical and Research Foundation. She is married and has one child.

== Early life ==
Suvari was born in Newport, Rhode Island. She is the daughter of nurse Candice (née Chambers) and psychiatrist Ando Ivar Süvari. Her mother is of Greek descent, while her father was an Estonian from Pärnu. She has six siblings. Suvari began modeling with Millie Lewis Models and Talent as a preteen and soon after appeared in a Rice-A-Roni commercial. The family later relocated to Charleston, South Carolina, where her brothers attended The Citadel. Suvari was considering becoming an archaeologist, astronaut, or doctor when a modeling agency stopped by her all-girls school, Ashley Hall, to offer classes. By the time she started acting, she had been modeling for the New York-based Wilhelmina agency for five years. Suvari relocated to California and attended Providence High School in Burbank, graduating in 1997.

== Career ==
=== 1995–1998: Early acting credits ===
Suvari began acting with guest appearances in television series such as Boy Meets World and ER at the ages of 15 and 16, respectively. She also appeared in a number of episodes of the show High Incident, and played a girl infected with HIV in a one-episode appearance in Chicago Hope. She made the transition to film with the role of Zoe in the 1997 independent coming-of-age drama Nowhere, directed by Gregg Araki and co-starring James Duval, Rachel True, Heather Graham, and Ryan Phillippe. Also in 1997, she had a supporting part in the independent film Snide and Prejudice, which premiered at the Cannes Film Festival, and had a brief part in the thriller Kiss the Girls, alongside Morgan Freeman and Ashley Judd. She next appeared in the independent dramedy Slums of Beverly Hills, as a teenaged neighbor of a Jewish girl struggling to grow up in the late 1970s. The film received a limited release, and has developed a cult following. Suvari met Natasha Lyonne on the set of Slums, with whom she would later appear in the American Pie films. She subsequently played a teenager who commits suicide in the horror sequel The Rage: Carrie 2 (1999), and appeared as the daughter of an NTSB investigator in the disaster thriller NBC miniseries Atomic Train (1999), although both productions were panned by critics.

=== 1999–2001: Breakthrough and award success ===
Her breakthrough came in 1999, with significant roles in two highly successful films —the teen sex comedy American Pie and the drama American Beauty. In American Pie, she starred with Jason Biggs, Shannon Elizabeth, Chris Klein, and Natasha Lyonne, portraying a virgin and innocent choir girl named Heather. While critical response was mixed, the film was a commercial success, grossing $235 million worldwide.

For American Beauty, the film was directed by Sam Mendes, written by Alan Ball, and starring Kevin Spacey, Annette Bening, Thora Birch, and Wes Bentley. In the film, Suvari played a vain teenage girl who becomes the object of infatuation of a middle-aged man experiencing a midlife crisis. The New York Times described her character as "stimulus enough for [Spacey's character] to wake up out of a marriage-long coma and start considering life's livelier possibilities". The film received widespread critical acclaim, and received the Academy Award for Best Picture. American Beauty made $356 million globally and earned Suvari a BAFTA Award nomination for Best Supporting Actress. Suvari and her American Beauty co-stars Wes Bentley and Thora Birch presented the 2000 Oscar for Best Documentary short subject.

Suvari subsequently reunited with Jason Biggs in the romantic comedy Loser (2000), playing the love interest of a small-town, intelligent man. A lukewarm critical and commercial reception greeted the film, but The New York Times found Suvari to be "well matched with the handsome, unassuming Mr. Biggs. They're attractive without being offensively cute, and their characters manage to be genuinely nice without seeming bland or phony". She and Biggs also appeared in the music video for the song "Teenage Dirtbag" by American rock band Wheatus. The video was heavily based on their roles in Loser. She then starred in the satirical comedy American Virgin, as the daughter of an adult film director who agrees to lose her virginity onscreen to spite her father. The original working title of the film was Live Virgin, but was changed to capitalize on Suvari's previous successes in American Pie and American Beauty.

Suvari continued to act steadily, taking on roles in three 2001 feature films —The Musketeer, American Pie 2 and Sugar & Spice. In the adventure action film The Musketeer, she played a chambermaid and the love interest of the titular character, while American Pie 2 saw her reprise her role from the first film. Like the original, the sequel was a commercial success, grossing $285 million globally. In the teen crime comedy Sugar & Spice, Suvari portrayed one member of a group of cheerleaders who conspire and commit armed robbery. Although the film received negative reviews and only made $16.9 million worldwide, it has since become a cult favorite on home video.

=== 2002–2009: Independent films ===
In Spun (2002), an independent dramedy opposite Brittany Murphy and John Leguizamo about drug abuse, Suvari played an addict and the girlfriend of a drug dealer (Leguizamo). She subsequently appeared as a prostitute working in a New Orleans brothel in the small-scale drama Sonny (2002), the directorial debut of Nicolas Cage co-starring James Franco and Brenda Blethyn, and also starred opposite Colin Firth in the psychological thriller Trauma (2004), as the neighbour of a man who awakens from a coma. Trauma premiered on the film festival circuit, receiving mediocre reviews from critics, who compared it unfavorably to Jacob's Ladder and Memento. In the fourth season of the acclaimed HBO serial Six Feet Under, which aired in 2004, Suvari obtained the recurring role of a lesbian performance poet and artist named Edie. She and the cast eventually received a Screen Actors Guild Award nomination for Outstanding Performance by an Ensemble in a Drama Series. She played supporting parts in five feature films the following year—Standing Still, Edmond, Rumor Has It, Domino, and Beauty Shop.

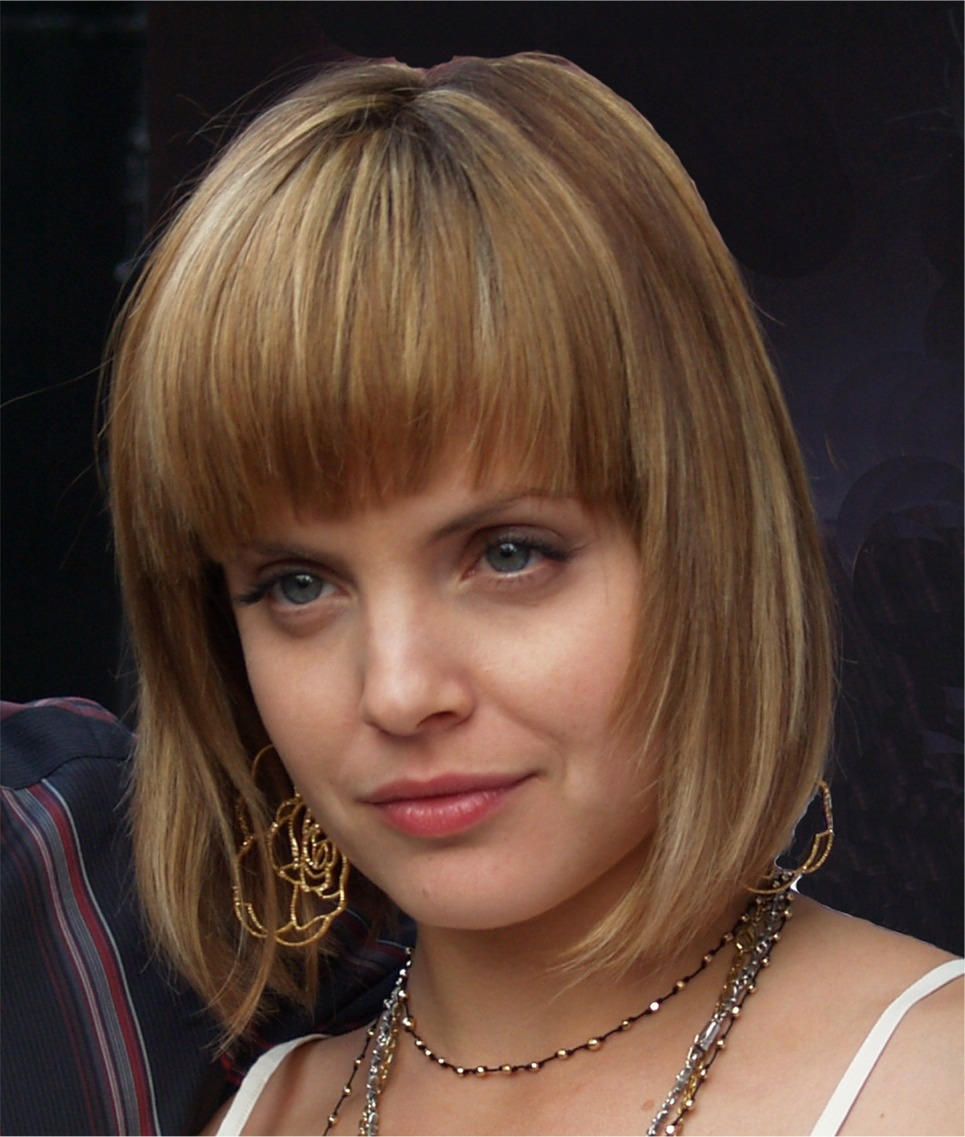
Suvari in 2007

In 2006, Suvari voiced the character of Aerith Gainsborough for the Square Enix–Disney video game Kingdom Hearts II and the English-language version of Square Enix's film Final Fantasy VII Advent Children, which was released straight-to-DVD in North America and became one of the best-selling animated movies in the country. Opposite Katherine Heigl, Suvari starred in the independent comedy Caffeine (2006), playing the staff of a London coffeehouse, and in the biographical drama Factory Girl (2006), she played a friend and roommate of 1960s underground film star and socialite Edie Sedgwick (played by Sienna Miller). While Caffeine went unnoticed, Factory Girl received a limited theatrical release amid a negative critical response.

In the crime drama Brooklyn Rules (2007), directed by Michael Corrente and co-starring Freddie Prinze Jr., Alec Baldwin and Scott Caan, Suvari portrayed a society girl and the girlfriend of a man involved with the Brooklyn mafia in the 1980s. The film was released for selected theaters and received mixed reviews, but Variety remarked that Suvari, "who might have played [her part] as a cliché, gives a real performance". Her next film was the psychological thriller Stuck, where she took on the role of a woman who commits a hit-and-run and leaves the victim clinging to his life in the windshield of her car. Inspired by the true story of the murder of Gregory Glenn Biggs, the film premiered at the Cannes Film Market, and while Stuck found a limited theatrical release, it was favorably received by critics and audiences. Austin Chronicle found the film to be "buoyed by queasy, easy performances" from Suvari and Rea, who were considered "well-matched in uneasy roles" by Empire.

By the late 2000s, Suvari continued to act in smaller-scale projects, obtaining four back-to-back roles in films released throughout 2008, including one made-for-television film. Day of the Dead, a remake of George A. Romero's horror film of the same name, saw her portray what was described as a "butch military leader capable of fending off a zombie holocaust", by DVD Talk. The film received a straight-to-DVD release and was panned by critics. In The Mysteries of Pittsburgh, a film adaptation of writer Michael Chabon's novel, Suvari played a strange girl who works at a book shop and becomes romantically involved with the well-mannered, intelligent son of a Jewish gangster. The film premiered at the Sundance Film Festival and received a limited release. Website Collider felt that Suvari did a "decent job" in her "small" part, while Roger Ebert called her "pitch-perfect" in a "finally thankless role", as part of a mixed critical reception.

The Garden of Eden, the film adaptation of Ernest Hemingway's novel, featured Suvari as a sexually confused and restless woman and one half of a couple who travel across Europe amid a deteriorating marriage. She shaved her head for the part, but used three wigs for the in-between stages; on which she remarked: "It was a bit strange. It was also very liberating at the same time [...] I am grateful for the experience I am happy that I got to do it at least once in my life. It was like its own psychological experiment. It was very empowering for me to go through and a challenging to experience how people perceive you". The film premiered at the Rome Film Festival and had a limited investors' screening in the UK. Reviews were negative for the film, with the Los Angeles Times calling it a "literary B-side turned into something not awful, just forgettable". Her last 2008 film was the Lifetime production Sex and Lies in Sin City, about the events leading to the death of Las Vegas casino owner Ted Binion.

=== 2010–present: Television roles ===
Suvari made one-episode appearances in Psych in 2010, and in The Cape in 2011, and also had a two-episode arc as the Black Dahlia in Murder House, the first season of the anthology horror series American Horror Story. In the independent romantic comedy You May Not Kiss the Bride (2010), opposite Dave Annable, Katharine McPhee and Rob Schneider, Suvari starred as the psychotic assistant of a pet photographer. The film debuted at the Sonoma International Film Festival and was released for selected theaters and VOD, garnering largely negative reviews. Blu-ray.com considered the film to be "a noisy, unlikable distraction" that "depends on Suvari and Schneider to carry the comedy workload, which is about as appealing as it reads". In 2011, she also starred in the made-for-television film No Surrender, as a writer having a deranged stalker, and in the B movie Restitution, opposite Tom Arnold.

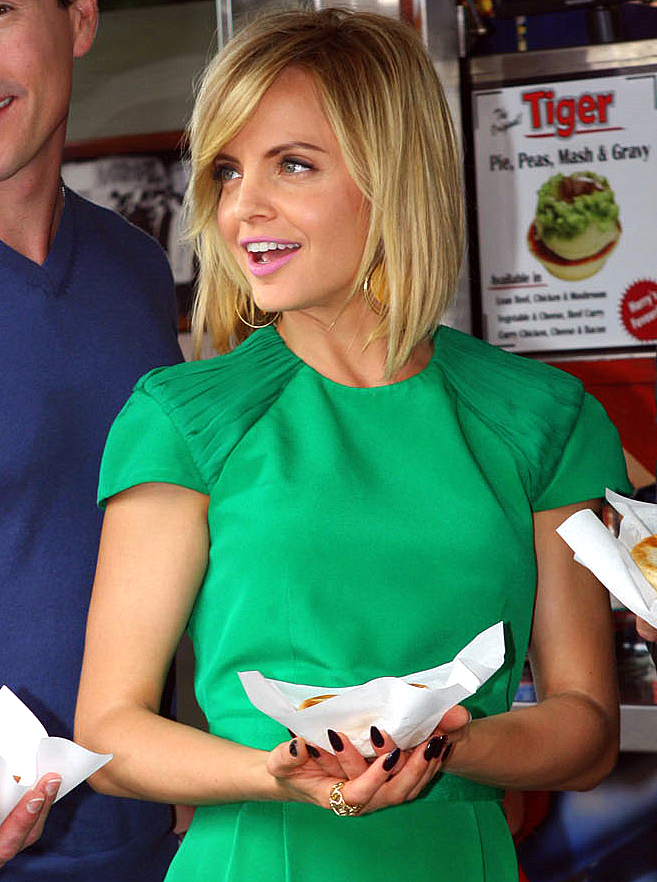
Suvari at the Sydney premiere of American Reunion (2012)

Suvari returned to the American Pie franchise when she played for the third time her role of Heather in American Reunion (2012), revolving around the original protagonists as they approach middle age and prepare for a summer reunion. Reviewers found the film to be a "sweetly nostalgic comfort food" for fans of the franchise, and with a worldwide gross of $235 million, American Reunion emerged as Suvari's most-widely seen film since 2001's American Pie 2. This film also marked her only wide release in the 2010s, as her later releases, such as The Knot (2012), Don't Blink (2014), The Opposite Sex (2014), Badge of Honor (2015), and Becks (2017), premiered on either festival circuits or digital markets.

In the romantic comedy The Knot, Suvari starred as the soon-to-be-married daughter of a working-class couple, and in the mystery thriller Don't Blink, Suvari played one in a group of friends who visit an empty remote resort and attempt to find out what happened to the other guests. In its review for the latter film, FrightFest.co.uk remarked: "[...] Suvari is wasted and not given a whole lot of screen time considering that her character is the one we're obviously supposed to latch onto". Suvari starred opposite Geoff Stults and Kristin Chenoweth in the romantic comedy The Opposite Sex, as a young divorcee resenting men who meets a successful, driven attorney and womanizer. The small-scale thriller Badge of Honor saw her star as a detective caught up in the aftermath of a violent drug bust.

The independent romantic comedy Becks featured Suvari as the friend of a lesbian musician who moves back to St. Louis. Despite finding a limited audience, the film received positive reviews from critics. The New York Times felt that the film "exemplifies how small judgments in pace, performance and soundtrack can transcend modest trappings", while The Washington Post remarked: "[Lena] Hall and Suvari have a palpable chemistry, both musically and in their relationship".

Suvari continued to work steadily on television between films and throughout the decade; she obtained the regular role of a political consultant of a firefighter in the second season of the series Chicago Fire (2013), and took on the leading role of a demon-hunter for hire in the eight-episode supernatural series South of Hell (2015). All episodes of the show aired back-to-back and an eighth episode was made available only through iTunes. The series received generally negative reviews and brought an average of 122,000 viewers. The Hollywood Reporter, commenting on Suvari, asserted: "[W]hile the prospect of playing [her role] seems like it ought to be enticing for Suvari, her more general interpretation appears to be closer to miserable discomfort, which may be related to either those contact lenses or the strangeness" in her portrayal.

Between 2016 and 2017, Suvari made guest appearances in the television series Inside Amy Schumer, Justice League Action, and American Ninja Warrior, and starred in the made-for-television films I'll Be Home for Christmas and Psych: The Movie, where she reprised her guest-starring role from the series and basis of the film. The sitcom American Woman features Suvari in a main role as one of three women discovering their own brand of independence amid the rise of second-wave feminism in the 1970s. The series premiered on June 8, 2018, on Paramount Network. The series was canceled after one season. Suvari reprised her role as Black Dahlia in an episode of American Horror Story: Apocalypse.

In 2024, Suvari had a main role as Detective Thompson on the Gala Film short form science fiction series RZR. For her performance, she was nominated for the Primetime Emmy Award for Outstanding Performer in a Short Form Comedy or Drama Series, marking the first Emmy nomination in her career. She portrayed Jane Wyman in a supporting role in the 2024 biographical film Reagan.

== Public image ==
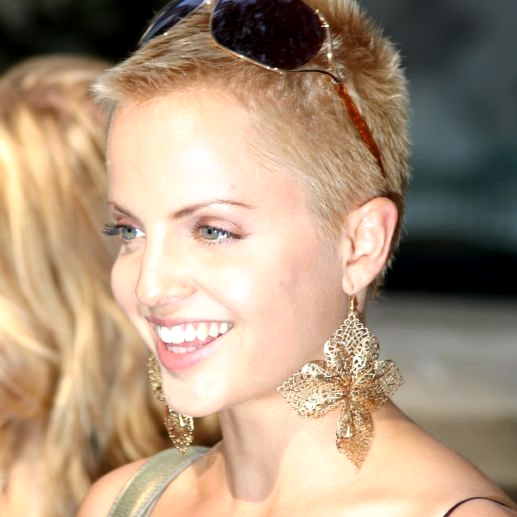
Suvari at the Fall 2007 Mercedes-Benz Fashion Week in NYC

Suvari is a model for Lancôme cosmetics and print ads for Lancôme Paris Adaptîve. She has also appeared in print ads for luxury accessories company Coach. She has appeared in commercials for Continental Sauces, Orange and Rice-A-Roni. Suvari has been featured in several fashion blogs and magazines such as Seventeen, Elle, Cosmopolitan (Hungary, Estonia and the US), Details, Rolling Stone, Vogue, Marie Claire, Nylon, Vanity Fair, Glamour, Tatler and Lucky. She is a frequent guest star at New York Fashion Week, among other fashion events.

People magazine published an article about her titled "All-American Girl" in 1999.

She was chosen as the most "patriotic" artist of 2000 by Entertainment Weekly, making allusion to her three consecutive films with the word "American" in their titles: American Pie (1999), American Beauty (1999) and American Virgin (2000).

== Philanthropy ==
Suvari has worked several times with the Natural Resources Defense Council, designing with the group a scarf line called ECHO, which was unveiled at Bloomingdales in Manhattan. She remarked: "I've always been into fashion and I wanted to design something to give to charity". She has also played on the World Poker Tour in the Hollywood Home games for the Starlight Children's Foundation, and is active in female empowerment issues, being involved with several charities whose cause is breast cancer, the "End Violence Against Women" campaign, and tours high schools as a "Circle Of Friends" spokesperson, encouraging teenagers to quit smoking. Suvari is a long-time supporter and activist for the African Medical and Research Foundation, and has visited Africa to work on "small-income-generating and water-and-sanitation projects" with the organization.

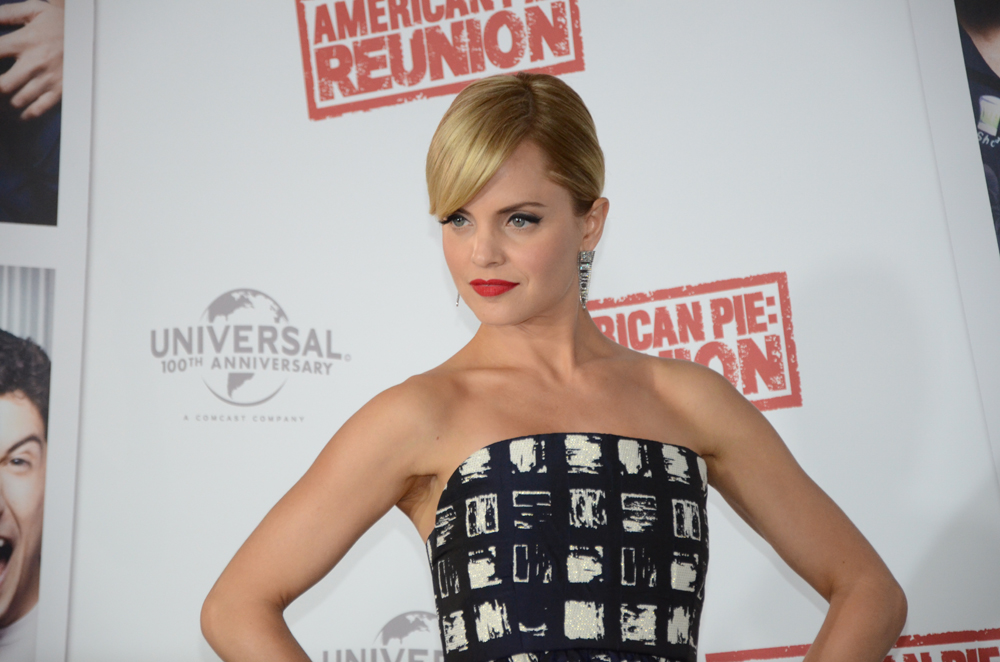
Suvari at the American Reunion (2012) premiere in Melbourne, Australia

== Personal life ==
Suvari married German-born cinematographer Robert Brinkmann on March 4, 2000. Brinkmann was 17 years her senior. On April 24, 2005, she filed for legal separation, citing irreconcilable differences; the divorce was finalized in May 2005.

In 2007, Suvari began dating Italian-Canadian concert promoter Simone Sestito, whom she met at the 2007 Toronto International Film Festival. Suvari and Sestito became engaged in July 2008 during a vacation to Jamaica. They were married on June 26, 2010, in a private chapel in Rome. On January 13, 2012, Suvari filed for divorce from him in Los Angeles, citing irreconcilable differences and listing November 1, 2011, as the date of separation. The divorce was finalized in October 2012.

In late 2017, Suvari became a vegan. Since then she has only used cruelty-free and environmentally friendly products, as well as sustainable clothing.

Suvari married set decorator Michael Hope in October 2018. On October 16, 2020, they announced that they were expecting their first child. In April 2021, it was announced that she had given birth to a boy.

== Filmography ==
=== Film ===
Year	Title	Role	Notes
1997	Kiss the Girls	Coty Pierce	
1997	Snide and Prejudice	Geli Raubal	
1997	Nowhere	Zoe	
1998	Slums of Beverly Hills	Rachel Hoffman	
1999	American Pie	Heather Gardner	
1999	The Rage: Carrie 2	Lisa Parker	
1999	Atomic Train	Grace Seger	Television film
1999	American Beauty	Angela Hayes	
2000	Loser	Dora Diamond	
2000	American Virgin	Katrina Bartalotti	
2001	The Musketeer	Francesca Bonacieux	
2001	American Pie 2	Heather Gardner	
2001	Sugar & Spice	Kansas Hill	
2002	Sonny	Carol	
2002	Spun	Cookie	
2004	Trauma	Charlotte	
2005	Standing Still	Lana	
2005	Edmond	Prostitute	
2005	Rumor Has It	Annie Huttinger	
2005	Domino	Kimmie	
2005	Beauty Shop	Joanne Marcus	
2006	Orpheus	Sue Ellen	Television film
2006	Factory Girl	Richie Berlin	
2006	Caffeine	Vanessa	
2006	The Dog Problem	Jules	
2006	Final Fantasy VII: Advent Children	Aerith Gainsborough	Voice, English version
2007	Brooklyn Rules	Ellen	
2007	Stuck	Brandi Boski	
2008	Day of the Dead	Corporal Sarah Cross-Bowman	
2008	The Mysteries of Pittsburgh	Phlox Lombardi	
2008	The Garden of Eden	Catherine Bourne	
2008	Sex and Lies in Sin City	Sandy Murphy	Television film
2010	You May Not Kiss the Bride	Tonya	
2011	Restitution	Katie	
2011	Love Notes	Emmylou	Short film
2011	No Surrender	Amelia Davis	Television film
2012	American Reunion	Heather Gardner	
2012	The Knot	Sarah	
2014	Don't Blink	Tracy	Also associate producer
2014	The Opposite Sex	Jane	
2015	Badge of Honor	Jessica Dawson	
2016	I'll Be Home for Christmas	Jackie Foster	Television film
2017	Becks	Elyse	
2017	Psych: The Movie	Allison Cowley	Television film
2019	Apparition	Anna	
2019	The Murder of Nicole Brown Simpson	Nicole Brown Simpson	Also executive producer
2020	Don't Tell a Soul	Carol	
2020	What Lies Below	Michelle Wells	
2020	Hide	Sarah	Short film
2021	Fourth Grade	Barbara	
2021	Grace and Grit	Treya Killam Wilber	
2021	Locked In	Maggie	
2021	Paradise Cove	Tracey	
2021	Ron's Gone Wrong	B-Bot	Voice
2022	Breakwater	Kendra	
2022	The Accursed	Alma	
2023	Hunt Club	Cassandra	
2023	Dark Obsession	Maya	Also producer
2023	All You Need Is Blood	Vivian Vance	
2024	Prey	Sue	
2024	Reagan	Jane Wyman	
2024	Ick	Staci	
2025	The Wrecker	Cheryl	
2025	Time of Death	Dr. Allison Burrell	
2026	The Dresden Sun	Asha	
2026	Vampires of the Velvet Lounge	Elizabeth	
TBA	Devoted	TBA	Post-production

=== Television ===
Year	Title	Role	Notes
1995–1996	Boy Meets World	Laura, Hillary	2 episodes
1996	Minor Adjustments	Emily	Episode: "A Fish Story"
1996	ER	Laura-Lee Armitage	Episode: "Last Call"
1996–1997	High Incident	Jill Marsh	5 episodes
1997	Chicago Hope	Ivy Moore	Episode: "Sympathy for the Devil"
1997	413 Hope St.	Crystal	Episode: "Thanksgiving"
2001	Just Shoot Me!	Blush Cover Girl	Episode: "Finch in the Dogg House"; Uncredited
2004	Six Feet Under	Edie	Recurring role (season 4); 7 episodes
2010	Psych	Allison Cowley	Episode: "Yang 3 in 2D"
2011	The Cape	Dice	Episode: "Dice"
2011	American Horror Story: Murder House	Elizabeth Short / Black Dahlia	2 episodes
2013	Chicago Fire	Isabella	Recurring role (season 2); 7 episodes
2013	Hollywood Game Night	Herself / Celebrity Player	2 episodes
2013	Lakewood Plaza Turbo	Enid Mettle / Ginger (voice)	Pilot
2014–2018	Clarence	Various characters (voice)	7 episodes
2014	Hysteria	Logan Harlen	Pilot
2014–2015	Celebrity Name Game	Herself / Celebrity Player	3 episodes
2015	South of Hell	Maria Abascal, Abigail	Main role; 8 episodes
2016	Inside Amy Schumer	Herself	Episode: "Psychopath Test"
2017	Justice League Action	Killer Frost (voice)	Episode: "Freezer Burn"
2017	American Ninja Warrior	Herself	Episode: "Celebrity Ninja Warrior"
2017	OK K.O.! Let's Be Heroes	Enid Mettle / Ginger (voice)	Episode: "Let's Watch the Pilot"; Archive footage
2017	Hot Date	Sex Store Owner	Episode: "Relationship Goals"
2018	Lip Sync Battle	Herself	Episode: "Alicia Silverstone vs. Mena Suvari"
2018	American Woman	Kathleen Callahan	Main role; 11 episodes
2018	American Horror Story: Apocalypse	Elizabeth Short / Black Dahlia	Episode: "Return to Murder House"
2024	RZR	Detective Thompson	Main role; 6 episodes
2026	American Horror Story: 13	Elizabeth Short / Black Dahlia	3 episodes

=== Video games ===
Year	Title	Role	Notes
2006	Kingdom Hearts II	Aerith Gainsborough	English dub
2016	OK K.O.! Lakewood Plaza Turbo	Enid Mettle	

=== Music videos ===
Year	Title	Artist	Role
2000	"Teenage Dirtbag"	Wheatus	Noelle

== Awards and nominations ==
Year	Association	Category	Title of work	Result
1999	Awards Circuit Community Awards	Best Cast Ensemble	American Beauty	Nominated
1999	Online Film Critics Society	Best Cast	American Beauty	Won
2000	Blockbuster Entertainment Awards	Favorite Actress – Newcomer	American Pie	Nominated
2000	Young Hollywood Awards	Best Ensemble Cast	American Pie	Won
2000	Young Hollywood Awards	Breakthrough Performance – Female	American Beauty	Won
2000	Screen Actors Guild Awards	Outstanding Performance by a Cast in a Motion Picture	American Beauty	Won
2000	BAFTA Awards	Best Actress in a Supporting Role	American Beauty	Nominated
2000	Teen Choice Awards	Choice Movie Breakout Performance	American Beauty	Nominated
2005	Screen Actors Guild Awards	Outstanding Performance by an Ensemble in a Drama Series	Six Feet Under	Nominated
2021	Montreal Independent Film Festival	Best Actress	Fourth Grade	Won
2022	Garden State Film Festival	Best Actress – Feature Film	Fourth Grade	Nominated
2024	Primetime Emmy Awards	Outstanding Performer in a Short Form Comedy or Drama Series	RZR	Nominated
