= Ava Acres =

American actress

- Occupation: Actress
- Years active: 2010–present
- Relatives: Isabella Acres (sister)

External image
- Acres in 2013.

Ava Acres is an American actress.

== Career ==
She played young Regina in Once Upon a Time and also appeared in Agents of S.H.I.E.L.D. as Katya Belyakov, the main antagonist of the episode "Melinda". In addition, she has played Madeline in season 5 of the television series American Horror Story, and young Rebecca in the comedy series Crazy Ex-Girlfriend. Acres' older sister, Isabella, is also an actress.

== Filmography ==
=== Film: voice roles ===
Year	Title	Role	Notes
2011	Happy Feet Two	Erik (speaking voice)	
2014	When Marnie Was There	Sayaka	English dub
2016	The Angry Birds Movie	Timothy	
2022	Diary of a Wimpy Kid: Rodrick Rules	Additional Voices	
2023	Leo	Additional Voices	

=== Film: live-action ===
Year	Title	Role	Notes
2012	Jobs	Young Lisa Jobs	
2013	The Devil's in the Details	Chloe	
2013	Free Ride	Shell	
2014	White Bird in a Blizzard	8 Year Old Kat	
2014	At the Devil's Door	Girl	
2014	The Face of an Angel	Bea	
2016	Holidays	Girl	
2016	Term Life	12 Year Old Cate	
2017	Handsome	Carys Vanderwheel	
2020	Haunting of the Mary Celeste	Jennifer / Sophia	
2023	No Right Way	Georgie	

=== Television: voice roles ===
Year	Title	Role	Notes
2011–2016	Adventure Time	Candy Kids / Candy Girl / Young Marceline / Jamaica	5 episodes
2011	The Cleveland Show	Girl	Episode: "Die Semi-Hard"
2012	Kung Fu Panda: Legends of Awesomeness	Zan	Episode: "Kung Fu Day Care"
2014	Clarence	Amy	Episode: "A Pretty Great Day with a Girl"
2015	Stakes	Young Marceline / Rabbit-Hatted Child	
2016–2021	Family Guy	Girl / Opie's Daughter / Kid / Bowling Alley Girl / Trick-or-Treater	8 episodes

=== Television: live-action ===
Year	Title	Role	Notes
2010	The Sarah Silverman Program	Little Laura	Episode: "Smellin' of Troy"
2010	Criminal Minds	Daughter	Episode: "Devil's Night"
2010	Weeds	Jessie	Episode: "Fran Tarkenton"
2010–2011	Pretend Time	Creepios Girl	2 episodes
2011	Harry's Law	Caitlyn Faulkner	2 episodes
2011	Outnumbered	Lucy Tulley	TV movie
2011	Five	Young Pearl	TV movie
2012	Southland	Candace Hanson	Episode: "God's Work"
2015	Mad Men	Susie	Episode: "Time & Life"
2015, 2017	Agents of S.H.I.E.L.D.	Katya Belyakov	2 episodes
2015	Fresh Off the Boat	Fake Kate	Episode: "Family Business Trip"
2015	My Stepdaughter	Lydia	TV movie
2015–2016	American Horror Story:Hotel	Madeleine	4 episodes
2015–2017	Crazy Ex-Girlfriend	Young Rebecca	Recurring role, 6 episodes
2016	Once Upon a Time	Young Regina	Episode: "Sisters"
2017	Wet Hot American Summer: Ten Years Later	Jenny	2 episodes
2018	Alex & Me	Gia	TV movie
2019	9-1-1	Charlotte	2 episodes

=== Video games ===
Year	Title	Role	Notes
2011	Kinect Disneyland Adventures		
2012	Medal of Honor: Warfighter	Bella	
