= Breakwater (2023 film) =

- Release poster
- Directed by: James Rowe
- Written by: James Rowe
- Produced by: Matt Paul; Larry Hummel; Edward Winters; Dana Lustig
- Starring: Dermot Mulroney
- Cinematography: Kai Krause
- Edited by: Caroline Ross
- Music by: Roque Baños
- Production company: Loose Cannon Pictures
- Distributed by: Vertical Entertainment
- Release date: August 19, 2023 (Cinequest)
- Country: United States
- Language: English

Breakwater is a 2023 American thriller film written and directed by James Rowe and starring Dermot Mulroney, Darren Mann, Alyssa Goss, Sonja Sohn, Celia Rose Gooding, and Mena Suvari.

== Cast ==
- Dermot Mulroney as Ray Childress
- Darren Mann as Dovey
- Mena Suvari as Kendra
- Alyssa Goss as Eve
- Sonja Sohn as Bonnie Bell
- Celia Rose Gooding as Jess

== Production ==
In June 2021, it was announced that Mulroney was cast in the film. In October 2021, it was announced that Mann, Goss, Sohn and Gooding have been added to the cast. Later that same month, it was announced that Suvari joined the cast and that filming occurred in North Carolina.

== Release ==
The film premiered at the Cinequest Film & Creativity Festival on August 19, 2023. The film was also shown at the Boston Film Festival on September 21, 2023. In October 2023, Vertical Entertainment acquired North American distribution rights to the film.

== Reception ==
On the review aggregator website Rotten Tomatoes, 44% of 9 critics' reviews are positive.

Andrew Stover of Film Threat rated the film a 6.5 out of 10 writing in his review consensus section: "an entertaining picturesque thriller." Randy Myers of The Mercury News gave the film a positive review and wrote, "Set in North Carolina, (the cinematography is killer) this twisty tale serves up acting sparks while Rowe injects this 'Cape Fear'-lite effort with welcome doses of dark humor."
