= The Devil's in the Details =

- DVD cover
- Directed by: Waymon Boone
- Written by: Waymon Boone
- Starring: Ray Liotta; Emilio Rivera; Joel Mathews; Raymond J. Barry; Noel Gugliemi; Lane Garrison; Jake Jacobson
- Production companies: Dark Details; Hollywood Media Bridge
- Distributed by: Image Entertainment; Eagle Films
- Release date: March 12, 2013
- Running time: 100 minutes
- Country: United States
- Language: English

The Devil's in the Details is a 2013 American thriller film directed and written by Waymon Boone in his directional debut. The film encircles an Arizona military veteran suffering post-traumatic stress disorder from a military experience when he gets caught up in a Mexican cartel's drug mule plot. It stars Ray Liotta, Emilio Rivera, Joel Mathews, Raymond J. Berry, Noel Gugliemi, Lane Garrison and Jake Jacobson.

== Plot ==
Thomas Conrad (Joel Mathews), a supermarket manager and ex-soldier, has trouble re-adjusting to a normal life. He has been suffered from post-traumatic stress disorder from a terrifying experience serving his country overseas; he has separated himself from his wife Selina (Jenna Lyng) and daughter Chloe (Ava Acres). Recommended to undergo rehab, he visits ex-Navy Seal and psychiatrist, Dr. Robert Michaels (Ray Liotta).

One evening Thomas accidentally rear-ends a vehicle. He reimburses the driver, a Mexican named Bill Duffy (Emilio Rivera), buying several drinks for him at a local bar. After becoming drunk, he passes out. He comes to restrained in a torture room; Bill reveals himself to be working for a drugs cartel and gives Thomas an ultimatum to cooperate with a cross-border drug smuggling operation, holding his wife and daughter captive at and threatening to kill them. During a series of phone calls, Thomas succeeds in getting his family into action. Many of Bill's associates check in to keep watch, making Thomas believe he had been taken to Mexico. On one instance, he pleads help from a young man who enters the room, but he is working with the others, soon bringing in Thomas's employee Olivia (Shi Ne Nielson) to shoot and kill her. Eventually Thomas's sister Claire gets a large amount of drugs and money from a designated house, but when she transports it to the drop-off spot, she is apparently shot and killed. Soon, his father Richard calls Dr. Robert Michaels for help. Around this time, it's revealed in a flashback that during his military duty Thomas inadvertently cornered and gunned down several armed kids in a home. Robert arrives at Thomas's wife's house, sneaks to the back and enters the house, ultimately killing two men to free the house of captivity.

Released from restraint Thomas kills an armed Trevor and shoots Corbin in the head. Escaping the torture room he realizes he was kept behind the same bar the entire time. He approaches Bill at the counter and shoots dead the provoking bartender Frank (Arturo del Puerto). Bill reveals there was no cartel and everything was his elaborate plan – they spied on him, set up the minor car accident, got him drunk in the bar, held him against his will and used certain audio clips to play tricks on him, all to goad Thomas into getting his family to commit the robbery of a drug dealer, something Bill admittedly did to other victims previously. Also Thomas's sister Claire was killed because his father involved the police. Exacting revenge, Thomas injects a lethal chemical compound into Bill, who dies. Leaving the bar and relieved to see outside again, Thomas drives home to see his wife and daughter waiting to greet him at the door.

== Cast ==
- Ray Liotta as Dr. Robert Michaels
- Emilio Rivera as Bill Duffy
- Joel Mathews as Thomas Conrad
- Raymond J. Barry as Richard Conrad
- Noel Gugliemi as Guzzo
- Lane Garrison as Trevor
- Jake Jacobson as Corbin
- Arturo del Puerto as Frank
- Albert Thakur as Hutchens
- Jenna Lyng as Selina
- Ava Acres as Chloe
- Justin Finney as Justin
- Shi Ne Nielson as Olivia
- Nikki Deloach as Claire
- Wes McGee as Kyle Conrad
- Ian Parks as Bar Patron

== Distribution ==
The Devil's in the Details was released in the United States on Blu-ray and DVD on March 12, 2013.

== Reception ==
The film has garnered mixed to negative reviews. Reviewed by the DVD Verdict, writer Tom Becker observed the film as "overwrought" and "under-thought", believing Ray Liotta contributed positively, the location and effects were "lite", and the suspense was scarce, but felt "the lack of a significant pay-off is just a tremendous cheat." Brendon Surpless of Blu-ray Definition called it "a rather mundane film" that "has some entertaining moments thanks to a solid performance by veteran Ray Liotta." In a less critical review, Michael Reuben of blu-ray.com argued that the film "keeps you guessing" and credited Joel Mathews as a credible victim and Emilio Rivera to be the "stuff of nightmares".
