= The Mysteries of Pittsburgh (film) =

2009 American film

- Promotional film poster
- Directed by: Rawson Marshall Thurber
- Screenplay by: Rawson Marshall Thurber
- Based on: The Mysteries of Pittsburgh by Michael Chabon
- Produced by: Michael London; Rawson Marshall Thurber; Pete Chiarelli; Jason Ajax Mercer; Thor Benander
- Starring: Jon Foster; Peter Sarsgaard; Sienna Miller; Mena Suvari; Nick Nolte
- Cinematography: Michael Barrett
- Edited by: Barbara Tulliver
- Music by: Theodore Shapiro
- Production company: QED International
- Distributed by: Peace Arch Entertainment
- Release dates: January 20, 2008 (Sundance Film Festival); April 10, 2009 (United States)
- Running time: 95 minutes
- Country: United States
- Language: English
- Box office: $80,238

The Mysteries of Pittsburgh is a 2008 comedy-drama film written and directed by Rawson Marshall Thurber, based on Michael Chabon's 1988 novel of the same name. It was produced by Michael London and executive produced by Omar Amanat. Set in 1980s Pittsburgh, the film follows the affairs of two young men with one woman, and later also with each other.

Shooting in Pittsburgh began sometime between January and September 2006 and ended in October 2006. The Mysteries of Pittsburgh made its world premiere at the Sundance Film Festival on January 20, 2008, and was released in the US on April 10, 2009 to predominantly negative reviews.

== Cast ==
- Jon Foster as Art Bechstein: The well-mannered, intelligent son of a Jewish gangster who gets caught up in a tangled love triangle with Jane and Cleveland.
- Sienna Miller as Jane Bellwether: Cleveland's girlfriend. In the novel, Jane is a minor character but is elevated to leading lady in Thurber's adaptation.
- Peter Sarsgaard as Cleveland Arning: Jane's rebellious bisexual boyfriend, with whom Art becomes involved. In the novel, Cleveland is entirely heterosexual; but, in adapting the film, he became merged with the homosexual character Arthur Lecomte, one of the novel's key love interests.
- Mena Suvari as Phlox Lombardi: A strange girl who works at the book shop, who becomes romantically involved with Art. In the novel, she is one of the main romantic interests along with Arthur, but her role is greatly reduced in the film.
- Nick Nolte as Joe Bechstein: Art's father is a Jewish gangster, who is disappointed with his son's choices and would like him to become a stockbroker.

== Production ==
Earlier attempts to bring Pittsburgh to the big screen failed, including Chabon's own attempt to adapt his novel. In early 2000, independent filmmaker Jon Sherman (writer and director of 1996's Breathing Room) adapted Chabon's novel into a screenplay, hoping to film it with Jason Schwartzman in the role of Art Bechstein. By August of the same year, Chabon announced that the project had fallen apart, sadly writing, "Ah, well. Maybe someday."

Director Rawson Marshall Thurber got hold of the project sometime prior to 2006, when he began filming after convincing Michael Chabon he could make it work. Chabon had seen the script, and was pleased with it. In order to facilitate the film adaptation, Thurber removed the character of Arthur Lecomte "whole cloth" from the original Chabon novel in what he described as "the most glaring change". Lecomte, a gay man for whom Art begins to develop feelings, had to be removed because Thurber felt strongly "that in order for the film to function properly, it needed a more efficient and more cinematic engine — in short, a love triangle." Consequently, many elements of Arthur Lecomte were folded into the character of Cleveland.

== Controversy ==
Cast member Sienna Miller created a minor stir in Pittsburgh when, in a 2006 interview with Rolling Stone, she referred to the city as "Shitsburgh", saying, "Can you believe this is my life? Will you pity me when you're back in your funky New York apartment and I'm still in Pittsburgh? I need to get more glamorous films and stop with my indie year." Miller has been parodied in Pittsburgh media (including one article that was headlined "Semi-famous actress dumps on the 'Burgh") and criticized for making what was seen as an unnecessarily disparaging remark, given the special treatment the film's cast and crew had been given by the visitor's bureau and other city offices. Miller soon apologized and said her remarks were taken out of context. She added that she was referring to the night time shooting schedule of the production, and that what she had seen of the city was beautiful.

== Reception ==
On review aggregator website Rotten Tomatoes, the film has an approval rating of 12% based on 42 reviews with an average score of 3.9/10. The site’s critics consensus reads, "A listless interpretation of Michael Chabon's first novel, Mysteries of Pittsburgh features none of the source material's charm, but has coming-of-age film cliches in abundance." On Metacritic, which assigns a normalized rating out of 100 top reviews from mainstream critics, the film has received an average score of 38, based on 14 reviews.

CBC News gave the movie and Thurber a damning review. Reviewer Martin Morrow felt Thurber was "out of his depth" with the Chabon novel, and were amazed that "like some act of reverse alchemy, Thurber has taken movie-friendly gold and turned it into dull metal." Morrow added that the film "cuts, combines or perversely twists the book's characters, drops some of the best scenes, skimps on the sex and – unbelievably – substitutes Thurber's leaden writing for Chabon's wit", whereas the original novel was "just as camera-ready" as Wonder Boys, which had been adapted into a film in 2000. Morrow was also critical of Thurber's "timid" take on Art's sexual revelation, and Foster's acting. He described Cleveland as a "perfect role" for Sarsgaard, and praised Sarsgaard's acting, but felt the character's humour was missing.

Gay City News felt that the adaptation compromised the "very literary" debut novel and criticized Foster's "cheap voice-over narration" for failing to add any dimension to what's happening on screen. Reviewer Gary M. Kramer was critical of the film for excising the character of Arthur, compressing the character of Phlox and for bringing supporting characters Jane and Cleveland into the foreground, and was critical of Sarsgaard's acting. The review concluded that the film "seems a victim of poor planning and bad timing" and was very distant from "the excellent source novel."

Dave White of Movies.com noted that the movie "makes the 1137th film in which Peter Sarsgaard is called upon to play a smug, condescending, somewhat unbalanced, louche, bisexual jerk" and suspected the actor might become typecast. White added his disappointment with the self-pitying and mopy qualities of Foster's character, and consequently felt the movie played as if "watching Felicity if she were a sexually experimental guy." Despite his grievances, White awarded the film a mildly below average C− rating and commented, "I don't want to bash it too much because it's obviously a labor of love from director Rawson Marshall Thurber (he made Dodgeball just to get the cash to free himself to make this)".

Roger Ebert of the Chicago Sun-Times gave the film two out of four stars, and felt the movie's premise was too similar to many others, such as the 1980s-set coming-of-age film Adventureland, which was released the week before, and is also set in Pittsburgh. He felt the main character was hard to sympathise with and that the plot was like a "1930s Warner Bros. social melodrama". Ebert was more praising of the acting for the film's supporting cast, but felt that their characters' motivations were left unclear. Sacha Howells of Film.com noted the release of The Mysteries of Pittsburgh coincided with the release of The Informers, another Jon Foster film about bisexuals in the 1980s, based on the Bret Easton Ellis novel of the same name. Howells noted that, while reviews for most films have been mixed, "the decision to see Pittsburgh on April 10 or Informers on April 24 is completely subjective -- do you like your literary adaptations debauched and nihilistic or wistful and bittersweet?", with Howells opining he would probably be seeing both.
