= The Mysteries of Pittsburgh =

Novel by Michael Chabon

- First edition cover
- Author: Michael Chabon
- Cover artist: Paul Bacon
- Language: English
- Genre: Novel
- Publisher: William Morrow and Company
- Publication date: April 1988
- Publication place: United States
- Media type: Print (hardback & paperback) and audio cassette
- Pages: 297 (hardcover edition)
- ISBN: 0-688-07632-7 (hardcover edition)
- OCLC: 17108799
- Dewey Decimal: 813/.54 19
- LC Class: PS3553.H15 M97 1988

The Mysteries of Pittsburgh is a 1988 novel by American author Michael Chabon. It is a coming-of-age tale set during the early 1980s in Pittsburgh, Pennsylvania.

It was Chabon's first novel, which he began writing as a 21-year-old undergraduate at the University of Pittsburgh. He continued to work on it during his studies (1985–87) in the Creative Writing Program of the Department of English at the University of California, Irvine, where he submitted it as his thesis for the Master of Fine Arts degree. One of his advisors, the novelist MacDonald Harris, sent it to his literary agent. It was published in 1988 and became a bestseller.

A film adaptation starring Jon Foster, Sienna Miller, Peter Sarsgaard, and Nick Nolte was released in 2009.

== Plot summary ==
Art Bechstein is the son of a mob money launderer, who wants him to succeed in a legitimate career. (He has even set up a job for him at the end of the summer in Baltimore at a financial firm managed by one of his old friends.) When Art graduates from the University of Pittsburgh, he has only a vague hope for a summer of adventure before he commits to the rest of his life. Bechstein almost immediately meets a charming young gay gentleman, Arthur Lecomte, and his friend, a highly literate biker, Cleveland Arning, who become his partners in many summer adventures. Art begins a relationship with an insecure young woman named Phlox Lombardi. As Art's attraction to Arthur grows, it destabilizes both relationships and reveals he may be bisexual. Art is also troubled when Cleveland begins moving deeper into the city's organized crime families, drawing him closer to his father's dangerous mob connections. Art's relationships with his dad, friends, and lovers become more and more entangled, causing a series of fallings out and unforeseen consequences.

== Settings ==
The novel takes place during summer. It begins in April, just after Bechstein has finished his four-year undergraduate education at the University of Pittsburgh. Specific settings include Carnegie Mellon University, Chatham College, Hillman Library, Lake Erie, Presbyterian University Hospital, Schenley Park, Schenley Bridge, and the Pittsburgh neighborhoods of Oakland, Squirrel Hill, Shadyside, Downtown, Mount Washington, East Liberty, Fox Chapel, and Highland Park. Bellefield Boiler Plant, informally labeled The Cloud Factory, located in Junction Hollow between Carnegie Mellon University and the Carnegie Museums of Pittsburgh, plays a special role in the novel.

== Literary significance and criticism ==
Because of the book's straightforward, even playful, treatment of gay love and bisexuality, Chabon was early-on identified as a gay writer. He has frequently been asked if this identification concerned him; his usual reply is that he worries that gay readers might feel he was being presented to them, under false pretenses, as one of their own.

A recently reissued edition featured an Author's Note entitled "P.S.", which details some of the novel's inspiration, problems, and process. For example, he often had to balance his early-model computer precariously on an old tool table. Many fans of his work asked about Chabon's sexuality, because of the gay characters in his novels. On page 12 of the expanded Notes section, he reveals that, although he is currently married to a woman, he has had same-sex relationships in the past. He also describes some of his inspirations, crediting experiences with Marcel Proust, The Great Gatsby, and Philip Roth as encouraging him to write.

== See also ==
- 1988 in literature
