= Chongalicious =

2007 homemade music video by Laura DiLorenzo and Mimi Davila

Chongalicious is a 2007 homemade music video performed by Laura DiLorenzo and Mimi Davila, who were drama students at Dr. Michael M. Krop High School in Unincorporated north Miami-Dade County. The song is a parody of Fergie's 2006 hit song "Fergalicious". It focuses on the term chonga, a slang term coined in Miami-Dade County describing a stereotypical way of dressing and behaving among working class Latin American women in Hialeah, Florida. The video was filmed on a digital photo camera and the music and vocals were later recorded with a simple microphone on a computer.

Radio station Power 96 said that it was one of their most requested songs after being discovered on YouTube. The singers said that they "didn't expect it to be this big." DiLorenzo and Davila became overnight celebrities, being profiled in The Miami Herald and appearing on local NBC, CBS and Telemundo television programs. They also made a cameo appearance on the video show of Pitbull on Mun2. The Chongalicious Girls served as the 2007 Grand Marshals of the annual King Mango Strut in Coconut Grove.

The Chongalicious Girls' second video was "I'm in Love with a Chonga", a spoof of T-Pain's 2006 song "I'm N Luv (Wit A Stripper)". It was released on YouTube on October 8, 2007. Thanks to the popularity of their first video, they were offered free studio space to shoot the new production. They rewrote the music and lyrics to avoid copyright problems and consulted with a lawyer about earning money from the project.
