= Millburn, New Jersey =

Township in New Jersey, United States

- Township
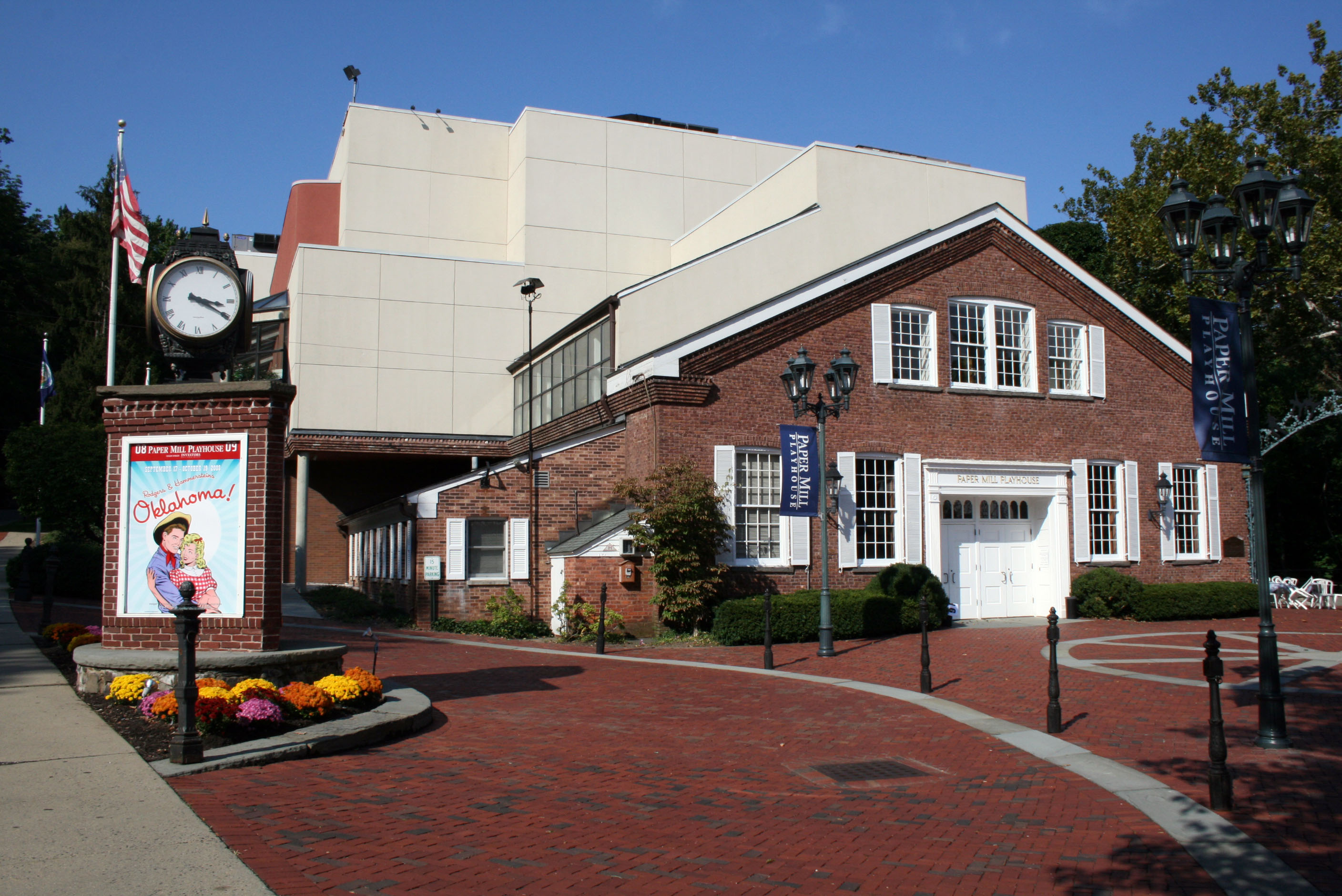
- The Paper Mill Playhouse in Millburn is one of the oldest and most prominent regional theaters in New Jersey.

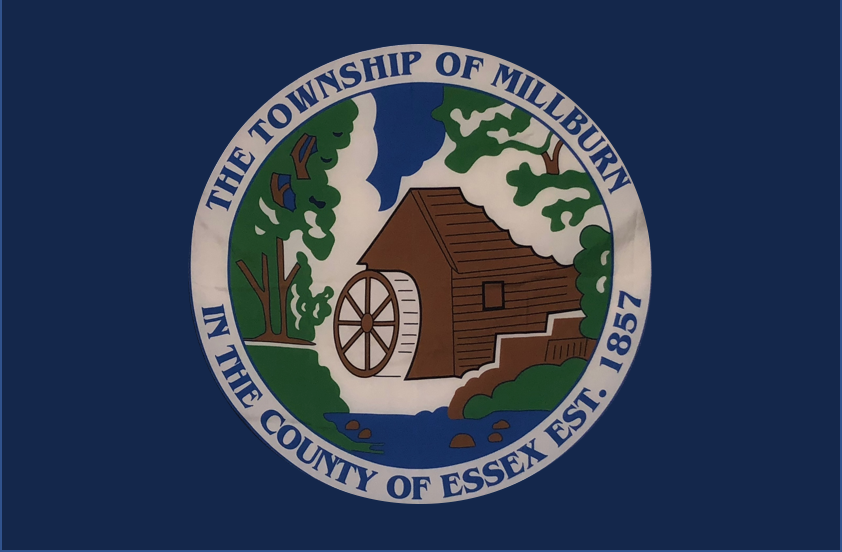
- Flag Seal

- Location of Millburn in Essex County highlighted in red (right). Inset map: Location of Essex County in New Jersey highlighted in orange (left).

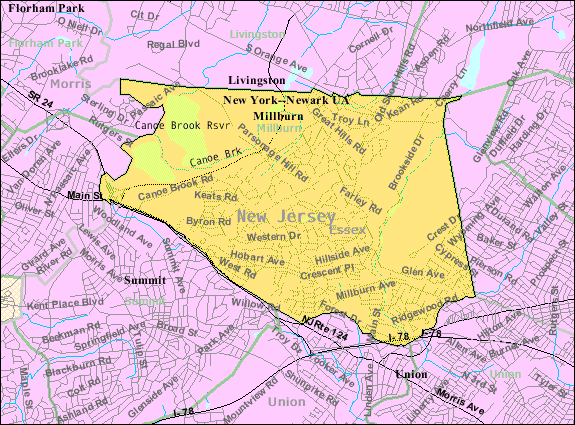
- Census Bureau map of Millburn, New Jersey
- Interactive map of Millburn, New Jersey
- Location in Essex County Location in New Jersey Location in the United States
- Coordinates: 40.741608°N 74.321286°W
- Country: United States
- State: New Jersey
- County: Essex
- Incorporated: March 20, 1857

Government
  - Type: Township
  - Body: Township Committee
  - Mayor: Frank Saccomandi IV (R, term ends December 31, 2026)
  - Administrator: Alexander McDonald
  - Municipal clerk: Christine Gatti

Area
  - Total: 9.89 sq mi (25.62 km^{2})
  - Land: 9.33 sq mi (24.17 km^{2})
  - Water: 0.56 sq mi (1.45 km^{2}) 5.64%
  - Rank: 211th of 565 in state 5th of 22 in county
- Elevation: 394 ft (120 m)

Population (2020)
  - Total: 21,710
  - Estimate (2024): 22,756
  - Rank: 128th of 565 in state 12th of 22 in county
  - Density: 2,326.2/sq mi (898.2/km^{2})
  - Rank: 267th of 565 in state 16th of 22 in county
- Time zone: UTC−05:00 (Eastern (EST))
  - Summer (DST): UTC−04:00 (Eastern (EDT))
- ZIP Codes: 07041 – Millburn; 07078 – Short Hills
- Area code: 973
- FIPS code: 3401346380
- GNIS feature ID: 0882221
- Website: twp.millburn.nj.us

Millburn is a suburban township in southwestern Essex County, within the U.S. state of New Jersey, and part of the New York metropolitan area. As of the 2020 United States census, the township's population was 21,710, its highest decennial count ever and an increase of 1,561 (+7.7%) from the 20,149 recorded at the 2010 census, which in turn reflected an increase of 384 (+1.9%) from the 19,765 counted in the 2000 census. Short Hills, with a 2020 population of 14,422, is an unincorporated community and census-designated place (CDP) located within Millburn that is home to most of the township's population.

Millburn was created as a township by an act of the New Jersey Legislature on March 20, 1857, from portions of Springfield Township, when Union County was formed. Earlier known variously as Milltown, Millville, Rum Brook, and Vauxhall, the name "Millburn" was adopted before the township was established. The township's name derives from the burn (Scottish for a stream) that powered mills in the area.

The township is home to the South Mountain Reservation, The Mall at Short Hills, and the Paper Mill Playhouse, an established regional theater. The West Branch of the Rahway River runs through downtown Millburn, and the Paper Mill Playhouse is situated on the banks of the river.

New Jersey Monthly ranked Millburn as the 53rd-best place to live in New Jersey in its 2008 rankings of the "Best Places to Live" in New Jersey.

Millburn had the highest annual property tax bills in New Jersey in 2018 of $24,308, compared to a statewide average of $8,767. The township had the highest annual bill in 2009 of $19,097, compared to the statewide average of $7,300 that year, which was the highest in the United States. This is primarily a function of high property values, as Millburn had the lowest effective property tax rate in 2014 (1.9%) among the 22 municipalities in Essex County.

The township is one of New Jersey's highest-income communities. In 2000, Millburn had the sixth-highest per capita income in the state, with $76,796. Based on data from the 2006–2010 American Community Survey, the township had a per-capita income of $84,663, ranked 10th in the state. Based on data from the American Community Survey for 2013–2017, Millburn residents had a median household income of $202,862, ranked highest in the state among municipalities with more than 10,000 residents, more than double the statewide median of $76,475.

== History ==
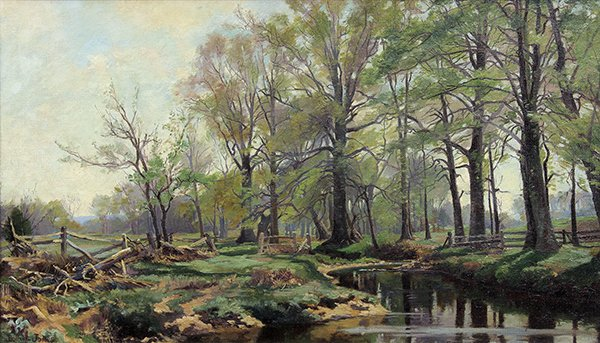
Spring by Hugh Bolton Jones, painted by the artist in the mid-1880s on the Rahway River

Millburn was an agricultural settlement before it became a Victorian residential community. It was part of the Newark settlements in New Jersey in the 19th century made from Charles II from James, his brother, in the 17th century. Springfield Township, founded in 1783, included Millburn.

Millburn played a vital role during the Revolutionary War. With George Washington's military camped outside at Morristown and the British assaulting through the Hobart Gap, Millburn was brought into the Revolutionary War. Washington purportedly saw his soldiers on a vital point in the South Mountain Reservation, then known as Washington Rock. The Battle of Springfield in 1780 was the last push of the British into New Jersey and the first American victory since Bunker Hill. A token of the war exists in the Parsil family graveyard on White Oak Ridge Road, where Nicholas Parsil was buried after being killed in a clash with the British.

After the revolution, the Rahway River was dammed in five spots to frame plant lakes. Samuel Campbell created the first paper mill in 1790 and produced banknotes. The majority of the early factories were paper plants, among them the Diamond Mill, that is now the site of the Paper Mill Playhouse. In 1835, the Morris and Essex Railroad was completed, connecting Millburn to enormous urban communities in the east and coal areas in the northwest.

Two unincorporated suburbs were created within its borders. Wyoming was made up of 100 acres (40 ha) of land and purchased by the Wyoming Land and Improvement Company and the latter was founded by Stewart Hartshorn (the namesake of Hartshorn Elementary School) who purchased 1,550 acres (630 ha) of land to create Short Hills, New Jersey.

In June 2007, Millburn celebrated its 150th birthday in its downtown, in one of the biggest celebrations in Millburn history.

== Geography ==
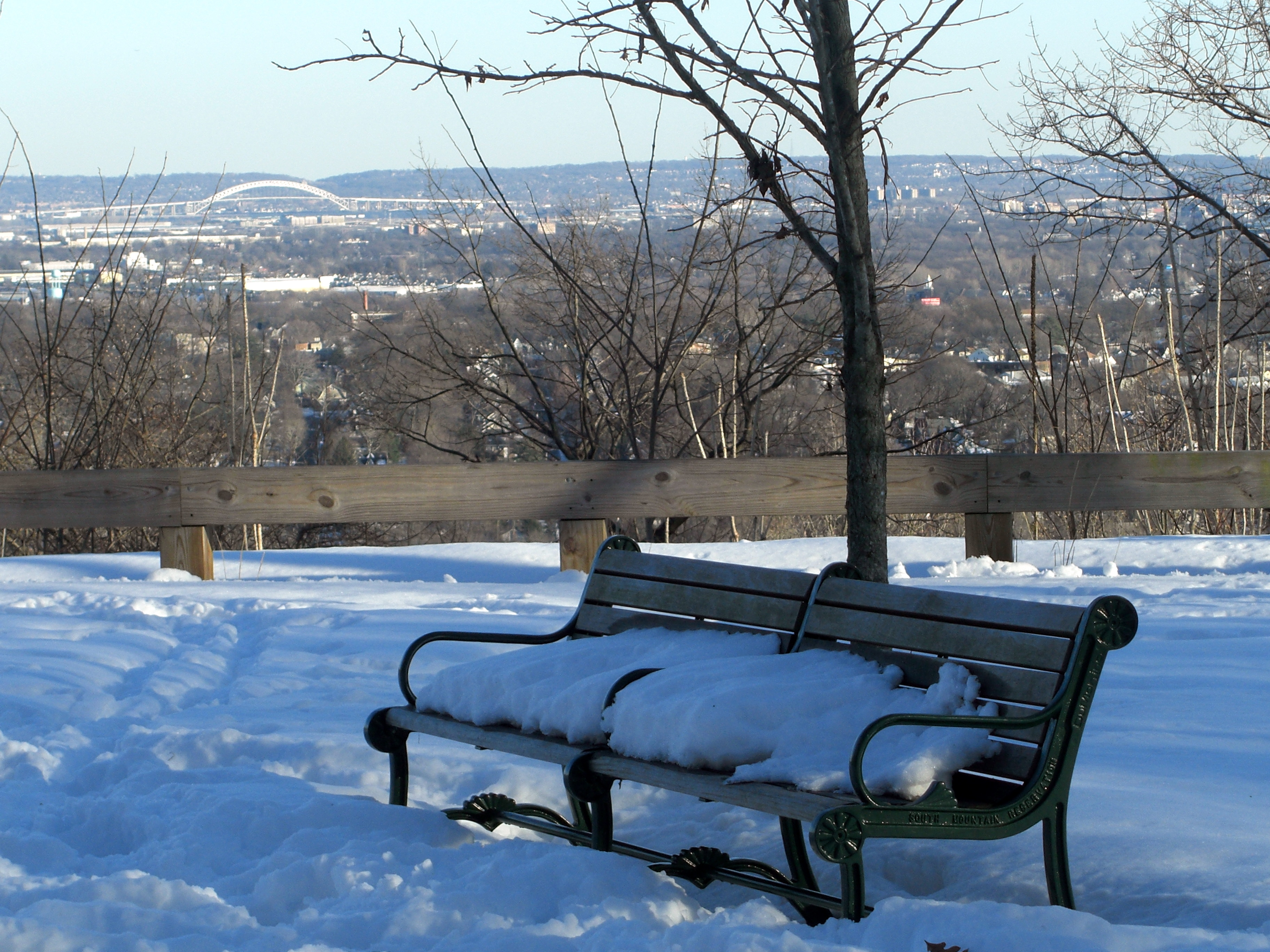
South Mountain Reservation in Millburn

According to the United States Census Bureau, the township had a total area of 9.89 square miles (25.62 km^{2}), including 9.33 square miles (24.17 km^{2}) of land and 0.56 square miles (1.45 km^{2}) of water (5.64%).

Unincorporated communities, localities, and place names located partially or completely within the township include Brantwood, Canoe Brook, Short Hills, Washington Rock, White Oak Ridge and Wyoming. Millburn includes the Wyoming district, South Mountain and Millburn center. Short Hills includes Brookhaven, Country Club, Deerfield-Crossroads, Glenwood, Knollwood, Merrywood, Mountaintop, Old Short Hills Estates and White Oak Ridge.

Situated approximately 15 miles (24 km) west of Midtown Manhattan, Millburn is bordered by the Essex County municipalities of Livingston and West Orange to the north and northeast; Maplewood to the east; the Morris County municipalities of Chatham Borough and Florham Park to the west and southwest; and the Union County municipalities of Summit to the south, and Springfield and Union townships to the southeast.

As of 2026, the township is a member of Local Leaders for Responsible Planning in order to address the township's Mount Laurel doctrine-based housing obligations.

== Economy ==
The Mall at Short Hills is an upscale shopping mall anchored by Neiman Marcus, Nordstrom, Bloomingdale's and Macy's, with a gross leasable area of 1,400,000 square feet (130,000 m^{2}).

== Arts and culture ==
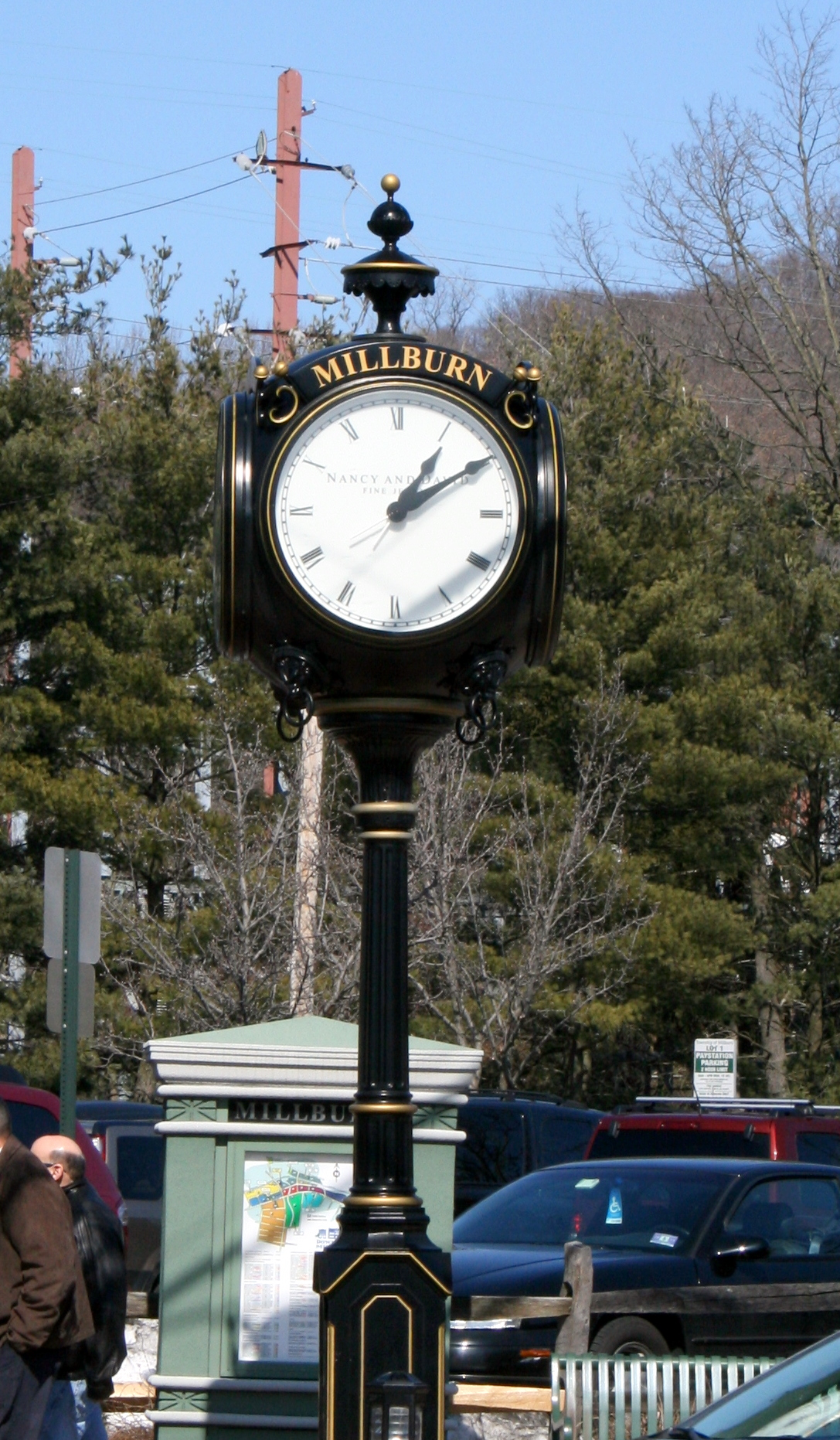
Clock tower at the intersection of Main and Essex Streets

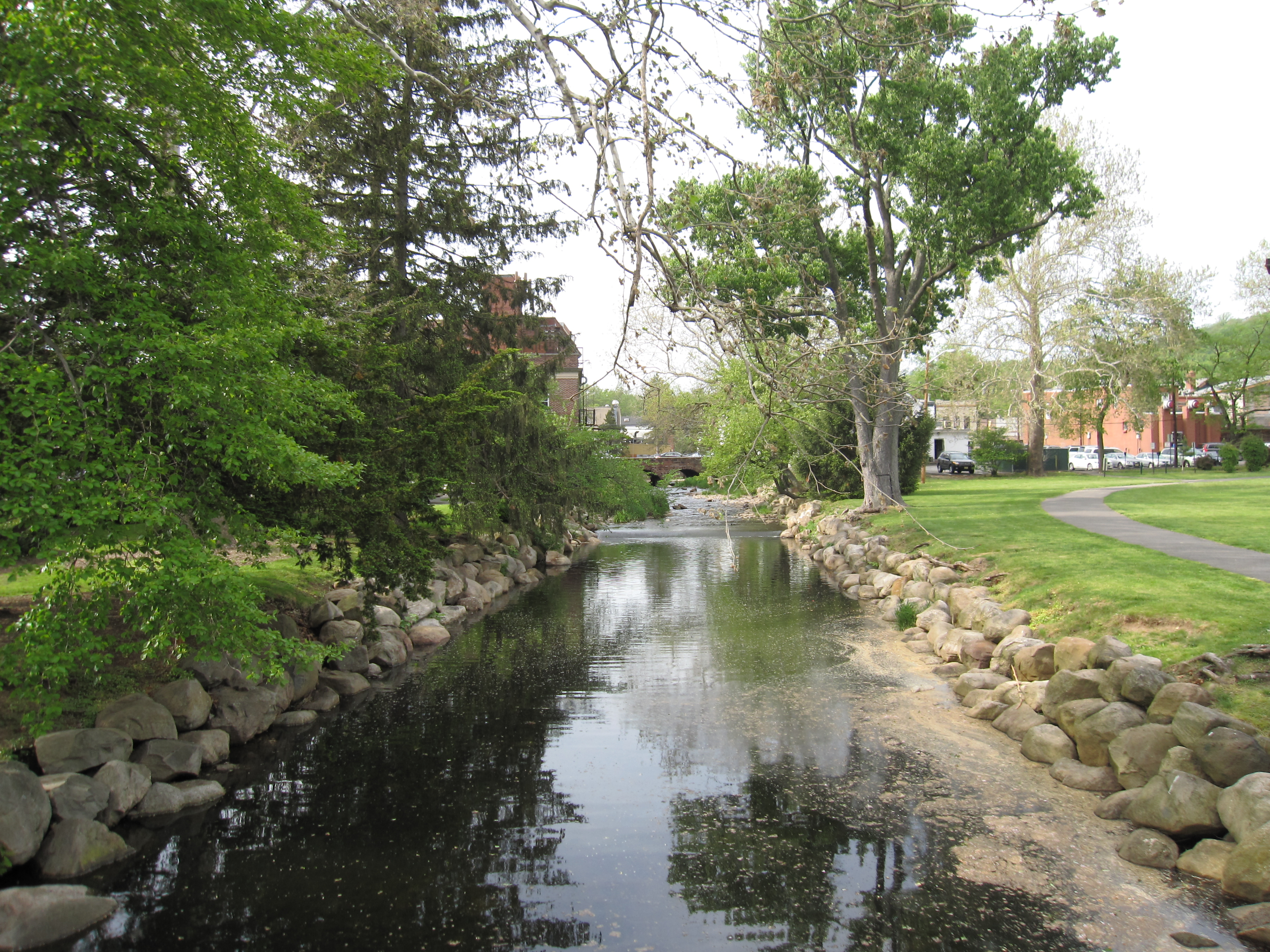
Taylor Park

- Paper Mill Playhouse is a 1,200-seat regional theater established in 1938, that has been officially designated as the "State Theatre of New Jersey".
- B'nai Israel synagogue was designed by architect Percival Goodman and features works by Herbert Ferber, Adolph Gottlieb and Robert Motherwell.

== Parks and recreation ==
- Cora Hartshorn Arboretum and Bird Sanctuary – A site owned by the daughter of Short Hills founder Stewart Hartshorn, the 16 acres (6.5 ha) park with its 3 miles (4.8 km) of trails was donated to the township in 1958.
- Greenwood Gardens – one of sixteen garden preservation projects in the United States overseen by the Garden Conservancy.
- South Mountain Reservation, an Essex County nature reserve covering more than 2,000 acres (810 ha) of land in Millburn, Maplewood and West Orange.
- Old Short Hills Park, Gero Park, Taylor Park and Slayton Field Park.

Fishing and kayaking is available on the Rahway River.

== Demographics ==
Historical population
Census	Pop.	Note	%±
1860	1,630		—
1870	1,675		2.8%
1880	1,743		4.1%
1890	2,437		39.8%
1900	2,837		16.4%
1910	3,720		31.1%
1920	4,633		24.5%
1930	8,602		85.7%
1940	11,652		35.5%
1950	14,560		25.0%
1960	18,799		29.1%
1970	21,089		12.2%
1980	19,543		−7.3%
1990	18,630		−4.7%
2000	19,765		6.1%
2010	20,149		1.9%
2020	21,710		7.7%
2024 (est.)	22,756		4.8%
Population sources: 1860–1920; 1860–1870 1870 1880–1890; 1890–1910 1910–1930; 1940–2000 2000; 2010 2020

Millburn has one of the largest Jewish communities in Essex County, along with neighboring Livingston and South Orange. Philip Roth's popular novel Goodbye, Columbus about a newly affluent Jewish family in the 1950s, was set in the Short Hills section of Millburn, and a key scene takes place at the Millburn High School track.

The township has attracted professionals who work in the financial industry in Manhattan, drawn by access to direct train service to New York Penn Station.

In a report performed by the United Way of Northern New Jersey based on 2012 data, around 11% of Millburn households were classified as "Asset Limited, Income Constrained, Employed" households (below a threshold of $50,000 for households below 65, below $35,000 for those over 65), struggling with basic necessities, such as housing, childcare, food, health care, and transportation, compared to 38% statewide and 47% in Essex County.

=== 2020 census ===
Millburn township, Essex County, New Jersey – Racial and ethnic composition Note: the US Census treats Hispanic/Latino as an ethnic category. This table excludes Latinos from the racial categories and assigns them to a separate category. Hispanics/Latinos may be of any race.
Race / Ethnicity (NH = Non-Hispanic)	Pop 2010	Pop 2020	% 2010	% 2020
White alone (NH)	15,587	12,147	77.36%	55.95%
Black or African American alone (NH)	303	458	1.50%	2.11%
Native American or Alaska Native alone (NH)	5	15	0.02%	0.07%
Asian alone (NH)	3,149	7,123	15.63%	32.81%
Pacific Islander alone (NH)	5	2	0.02%	0.01%
Some Other Race alone (NH)	22	146	0.11%	0.67%
Mixed Race or Multi-Racial (NH)	375	846	1.86%	3.90%
Hispanic or Latino (any race)	703	973	3.49%	4.48%
Total	20,149	21,710	100.00%	100.00%

=== 2010 census ===
The 2010 United States census counted 20,149 people, 6,813 households, and 5,553 families in the township. The population density was 2,161.3 per square mile (834.5/km^{2}). There were 7,106 housing units at an average density of 762.2 per square mile (294.3/km^{2}). The racial makeup was 80.17% (16,154) White, 1.63% (329) Black or African American, 0.03% (6) Native American, 15.66% (3,155) Asian, 0.02% (5) Pacific Islander, 0.51% (103) from other races, and 1.97% (397) from two or more races. Hispanic or Latino residents of any race were 3.49% (703) of the population.

Of the 6,813 households, 48.8% had children under the age of 18; 72.2% were married couples living together; 7.0% had a female householder with no husband present and 18.5% were non-families. Of all households, 15.9% were made up of individuals and 7.0% had someone living alone who was 65 years of age or older. The average household size was 2.96 and the average family size was 3.32.

32.3% of the population were under the age of 18, 4.2% from 18 to 24, 21.1% from 25 to 44, 31.2% from 45 to 64, and 11.3% who were 65 years of age or older. The median age was 41.0 years. For every 100 females, the population had 95.3 males. For every 100 females ages 18 and older there were 90.8 males.

The Census Bureau's 2006–2010 American Community Survey showed that (in 2010 inflation-adjusted dollars) median household income was $165,603 (with a margin of error of +/− $9,937) and the median family income was $194,421 (+/− $14,492). Males had a median income of $136,031 (+/− $14,137) versus $81,152 (+/− $9,621) for females. The per capita income for the borough was $84,663 (+/− $5,971). About 1.3% of families and 1.9% of the population were below the poverty line, including 1.9% of those under age 18 and none of those age 65 or over.

=== 2000 census ===
As of the 2000 United States census there were 19,765 people, 7,015 households, and 5,604 families residing in the township. The population density was 2,106.2 inhabitants per square mile (813.2/km^{2}). There were 7,158 housing units at an average density of 762.8 per square mile (294.5/km^{2}). The racial makeup of the township was 88.91% White, 8.40% Asian, 1.10% African American, 0.05% Native American, 0.03% Pacific Islander, 0.43% from other races, and 1.08% from two or more races. Hispanic or Latino residents of any race were 2.04% of the population. The most common reported ancestries in 2000 were 13.5% Italian, 12.2% Irish, 11.7% Russian and 11.5% German.

There were 7,015 households, out of which 44.3% had children under the age of 18 living with them, 71.6% were married couples living together, 6.3% had a female householder with no husband present, and 20.1% were non-families. 17.4% of all households were made up of individuals, and 7.7% had someone living alone who was 65 years of age or older. The average household size was 2.82 and the average family size was 3.19.

In the township, 30.2% of the population was under the age of 18, 3.2% was from 18 to 24, 28.4% from 25 to 44, 25.1% from 45 to 64, and 13.1% was 65 years of age or older. The median age was 39 years. For every 100 females, there were 94.1 males. For every 100 females age 18 and over, there were 90.2 males.

The median income for a household in the township was $130,848, and the median income for a family was $158,888. Males had a median income of $100,000+ versus $51,603 for females. The per capita income for the township was $76,796. About 1.2% of families and 1.5% of the population were below the poverty line, including 1.4% of those under age 18 and 1.0% of those age 65 or over.

== Government ==
=== Local government ===
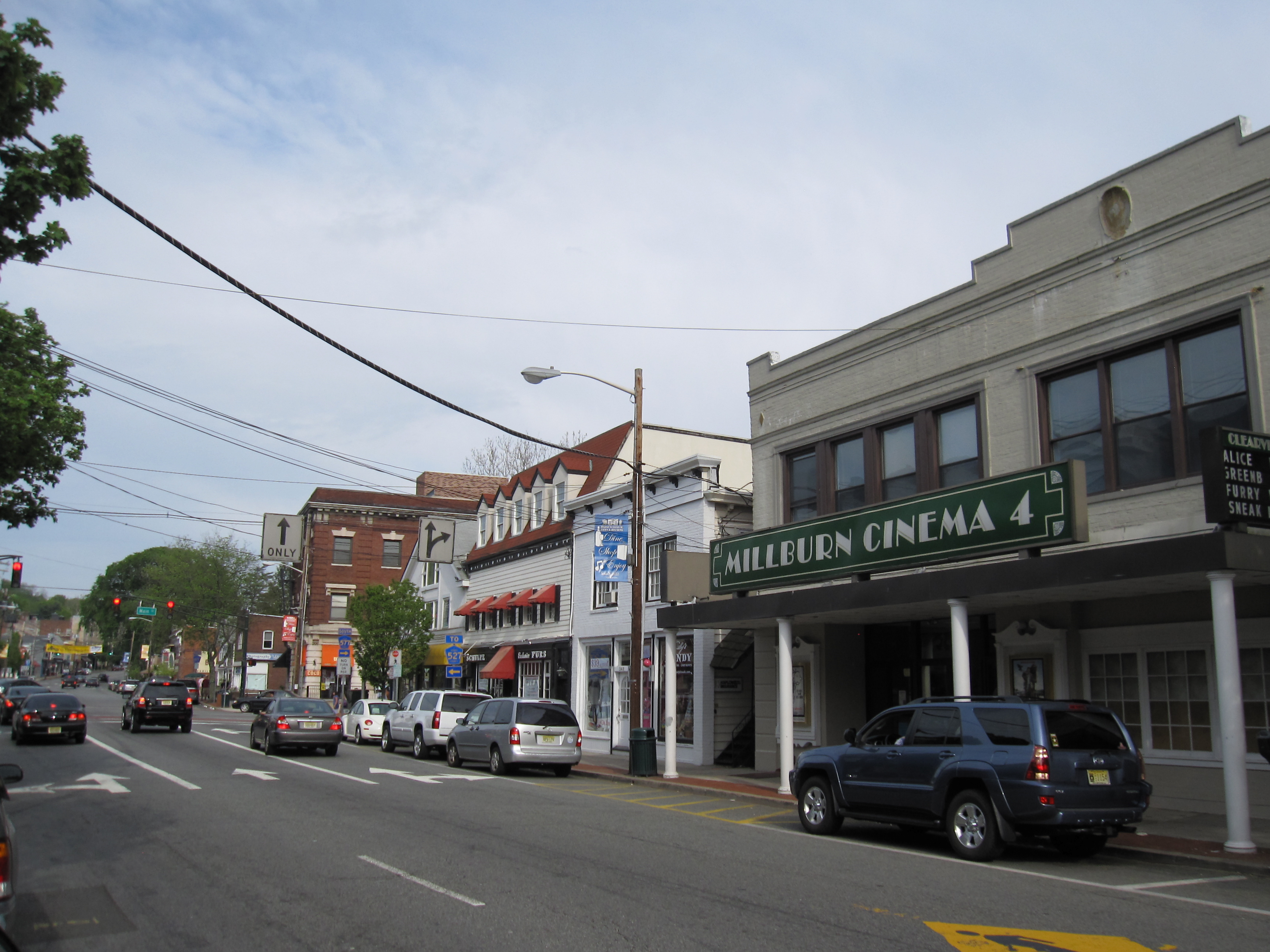
Millburn Avenue in downtown

Since its incorporation as a municipality in 1857, Millburn has been governed under the Township form of New Jersey municipal government, one of 141 municipalities (of the 564) statewide that use this form, the second-most commonly used form of government in the state. The Township Committee is comprised five members, who are elected directly by the voters at-large in partisan elections to serve three-year terms of office on a staggered basis, with either one or two seats coming up for election each year as part of the November general election in a three-year cycle. At an annual reorganization meeting, the Township Committee selects one of its members to serve as Mayor. A Business Administrator manages the day-to-day functions of the Township.

As of 2026, members of the Township Committee are Mayor Frank Saccomandi IV (R, term on committee and as mayor ends December 31, 2026), Deputy Mayor David R. Cosgrove (D, term on committee ends December 31, 2027 and as deputy mayor ends 2026), Michael Cohen (D, 2028), Jamie Serruto (R, 2028) and Ben Stoller (R, 2026).

Sandra Haimoff became Mayor in 2008 following the expiration of former mayor Daniel Baer's term on December 31, 2007. Daniel Baer's service had marked the first time in the history of the town that a Democrat held the title of Mayor.

In January 2026, Jamie Serruto made history as the youngest member to be elected to the Township Committee. He was previously the youngest Board of Education member in the Millburn Township Public Schools.

=== Federal, state, and county representation ===
Millburn is located in the 11th Congressional District and is part of New Jersey's 27th state legislative district.

For the 119th United States Congress, New Jersey's 11th congressional district is represented by Analilia Mejia (D, Glen Ridge) who was elected in a 2026 special election to serve for the remainder of the Congress following the resignation Mikie Sherrill (D, Montclair), who was elected Governor of New Jersey in 2025. New Jersey is represented in the United States Senate by Democrats Cory Booker (Newark, term ends 2027) and Andy Kim (Moorestown, term ends 2031).

For the 2026–2027 session, the 27th legislative district of the New Jersey Legislature is represented in the State Senate by John F. McKeon (D, West Orange) and in the General Assembly by Rosy Bagolie (D, Livingston) and Alixon Collazos-Gill (D, Montclair).

Essex County is governed by a directly elected county executive, with legislative functions performed by the Board of County Commissioners. As of 2025, the County Executive is Joseph N. DiVincenzo Jr. (D, Roseland), whose four-year term of office ends December 31, 2026. The county's Board of County Commissioners is composed of nine members, five of whom are elected from districts and four of whom are elected on an at-large basis. They are elected for three-year concurrent terms and may be re-elected to successive terms at the annual election in November. Essex County's Commissioners are:

Robert Mercado (D, District 1 – Newark's North and East Wards, parts of Central and West Wards; Newark, 2026), A'Dorian Murray-Thomas (D, District 2 – Irvington, Maplewood and parts of Newark's South and West Wards; Newark, 2026), Vice President Tyshammie L. Cooper (D, District 3 - Newark: West and Central Wards; East Orange, Orange and South Orange; East Orange, 2026), Leonard M. Luciano (D, District 4 – Caldwell, Cedar Grove, Essex Fells, Fairfield, Livingston, Millburn, North Caldwell, Roseland, Verona, West Caldwell and West Orange; West Caldwell, 2026), President Carlos M. Pomares (D, District 5 – Belleville, Bloomfield, Glen Ridge, Montclair and Nutley; Bloomfield, 2026), Brendan W. Gill (D, at large; Montclair, 2026), Romaine Graham (D, at large; Irvington, 2026), Wayne Richardson (D, at large; Newark, 2026), Patricia Sebold (D, at-large; Livingston, 2026).

Constitutional officers elected countywide are: Clerk Christopher J. Durkin (D, West Caldwell, 2025), Register of Deeds Juan M. Rivera Jr. (D, Newark, 2029), Sheriff Amir Jones (D, Newark, 2027), and Surrogate Alturrick Kenney (D, Newark, 2028).

=== Politics ===
As of March 2011, there were a total of 14,099 registered voters in Millburn, of which 4,512 (32.0%) were registered as Democrats, 3,214 (22.8%) were registered as Republicans and 6,361 (45.1%) were registered as Unaffiliated. There were 12 voters registered as Libertarians or Greens.

United States presidential election results for Millburn
Year	Republican		Democratic		Third party(ies)	
Year	No.	%	No.	%	No.	%
2024	3,077	30.54%	6,801	67.50%	197	1.96%
2020	2,953	25.33%	8,559	73.41%	147	1.26%
2016	2,768	28.17%	6,719	68.37%	340	3.46%
2012	4,087	43.95%	5,142	55.30%	70	0.75%
2008	4,144	40.18%	6,097	59.12%	72	0.70%
2004	4,525	43.97%	5,682	55.22%	83	0.81%

In the 2016 presidential election, Democrat Hillary Clinton received 6,719 votes to the Republican's 2,768. In the 2012 presidential election, Democrat Barack Obama received 55.3% of the vote (5,142 cast), ahead of Republican Mitt Romney with 44.0% (4,087 votes), and other candidates with 0.8% (70 votes), among the 11,587 ballots cast by the township's 14,594 registered voters (2,288 ballots were spoiled), for a turnout of 79.4%. In the 2008 presidential election, Democrat Barack Obama received 58.6% of the vote (6,097 cast), ahead of Republican John McCain with 39.8% (4,144 votes) and other candidates with 0.7% (72 votes), among the 10,410 ballots cast by the township's 14,034 registered voters, for a turnout of 74.2%. In the 2004 presidential election, Democrat John Kerry received 55.1% of the vote (5,682 ballots cast), outpolling Republican George W. Bush with 43.9% (4,525 votes) and other candidates with 0.6% (83 votes), among the 10,315 ballots cast by the township's 13,548 registered voters, for a turnout percentage of 76.1.

Gubernatorial election results for Millburn
Year	Republican		Democratic		Third party(ies)	
Year	No.	%	No.	%	No.	%
2025	2,936	36.59%	5,055	63.00%	33	0.41%
2021	2,160	33.00%	4,336	66.25%	49	0.75%
2017	1,928	35.04%	3,416	62.09%	158	2.87%
2013	3,301	63.49%	1,833	35.26%	65	1.25%
2009	3,308	48.22%	3,080	44.90%	472	6.88%
2005	3,010	44.17%	3,706	54.38%	99	1.45%

In the 2013 gubernatorial election, Republican Chris Christie received 63.5% of the vote (3,301 cast), ahead of Democrat Barbara Buono with 35.3% (1,833 votes), and other candidates with 1.3% (65 votes), among the 5,320 ballots cast by the township's 14,670 registered voters (121 ballots were spoiled), for a turnout of 36.3%. In the 2009 gubernatorial election, Republican Chris Christie received 47.9% of the vote (3,308 ballots cast), ahead of Democrat Jon Corzine with 44.6% (3,080 votes), Independent Chris Daggett with 6.4% (445 votes) and other candidates with 0.4% (27 votes), among the 6,906 ballots cast by the township's 13,913 registered voters, yielding a 49.6% turnout.

United States Senate election results for Millburn1
Year	Republican		Democratic		Third party(ies)	
Year	No.	%	No.	%	No.	%
2024	3,392	34.08%	6,393	64.23%	168	1.69%
2018	2,612	36.97%	4,330	61.29%	123	1.74%
2012	3,670	41.21%	5,027	56.45%	209	2.35%
2006	3,117	44.33%	3,853	54.80%	61	0.87%

United States Senate election results for Millburn2
Year	Republican		Democratic		Third party(ies)	
Year	No.	%	No.	%	No.	%
2020	3,490	30.30%	7,920	68.76%	108	0.94%
2014	2,063	39.48%	3,095	59.22%	68	1.30%
2013	1,305	35.68%	2,336	63.88%	16	0.44%
2008	3,985	42.47%	5,293	56.40%	106	1.13%

== Community organizations ==
Down the Block, Inc., a 501(c)(3) organization, was formed by residents in 2009 to pay bills on behalf of Millburn residents in financial distress.

New Eyes for the Needy is a non-profit organization started in 1932 as New Eyes (incorporated 1948) and based in Short Hills, which provides people in the United States with eyeglasses and sends recycled eyeglasses to needy people overseas.

The Millburn-Short Hills Volunteer First Aid Squad, founded in 1958, provides Emergency Medical Services to the township. They are an all-volunteer agency that does not charge for its services, relying solely on private donations to cover the costs of operating.

Scouts BSA Troop 19 chartered at St. Rose of Lima Church in Short Hills was founded in February 2019 when the Boys Scouts of America opened their program to girls. Troop 19 is one of the first all-girl troops in New Jersey and is part of Lenape Trail District of the Northern New Jersey Council. In 2019, Troop 19 became the first all-girls troop to march in the New York City Veterans Day Parade. St. Rose of Lima Church also sponsors Boy Scout Troop 17, which was founded in 1945.

== Education ==
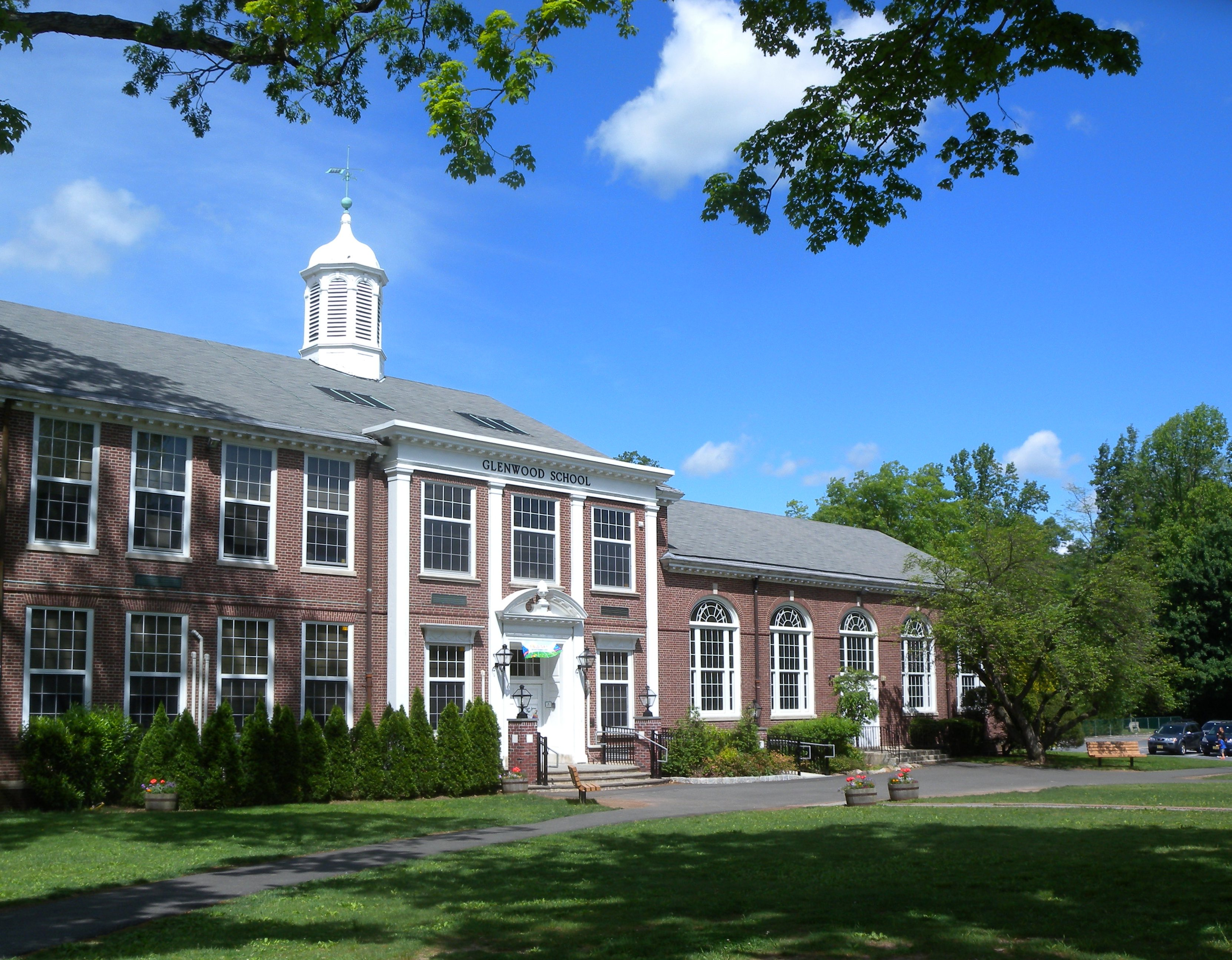
Glenwood Elementary School

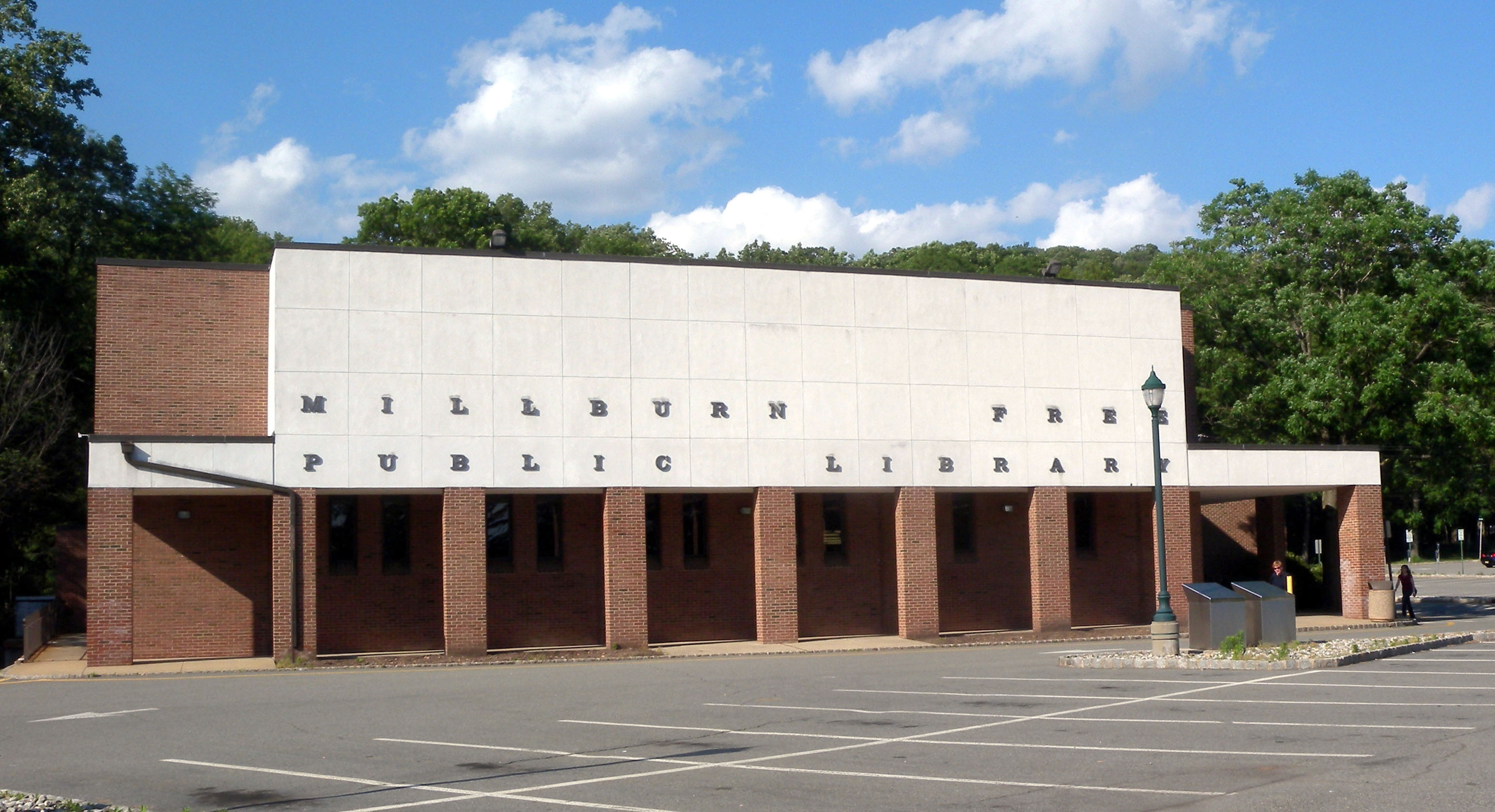
Millburn Free Public Library

The Millburn Township Public Schools serve students in pre-kindergarten through twelfth grade. The district is includes five K-4 elementary schools, a district-wide fifth grade school, a middle school and a high school. As of the 2020–21 school year, the district, comprised of eight schools, had an enrollment of 4,697 students and 418.2 classroom teachers (on an FTE basis), for a student–teacher ratio of 11.2:1. Schools in the district (with 2020–21 enrollment data from the National Center for Education Statistics) are Deerfield Elementary School with 400 students in grades Pre-K–4, Glenwood Elementary School with 357 students in grades K–4, Hartshorn Elementary School with 393 students in grades K–4, South Mountain Elementary School with 274 students in grades Pre-K–4, Wyoming Elementary School with 310 students in grades K–4, Washington School with 398 students in grade 5, Millburn Middle School with 1,197 students in grades 6–8 and Millburn High School with 1,319 students in grades 9–12.

In its 2015 report on "America's Top High Schools", Newsweek ranked Millburn the #1 open-admission and #4 non-magnet school in the nation. It placed 13th overall in the U.S. and 8th in the state among all participating public high schools (including selective admission and magnet schools). All schools ranked above Millburn are selective enrollment per their respective websites and are listed as magnet programs on Wikipedia.

The district's high school was the fifth-ranked public high school in New Jersey out of 339 schools statewide in New Jersey Monthly magazine's September 2014 cover story on the state's "Top Public High Schools", using a new ranking methodology. The school had been ranked 8th in the state of 328 schools in 2012, after being ranked 1st in 2010 out of 322 schools listed. The magazine also ranked Millburn as the top high school in New Jersey in its 2008 rankings.

The influx of younger families into the community has led to significant growth in public school enrollment, with enrollment doubling from 1990 to 2007.

Far Brook School is a private, nonsectarian coeducational day school located in the Short Hills section of Millburn, serving students in nursery through eighth grade, with a 2018–2019 total enrollment of 224 students. The Pingry School's Lower School (K–6) campus is located in Short Hills.

St. Rose of Lima Academy is a Catholic school with 260 students in Pre-K–3 on through 8th grade, operating under the auspices of the Archdiocese of Newark, that was established in 1869 and granted academy status in 2008. In September 2013, the St. Rose of Lima Academy was one of 15 schools in New Jersey to be recognized by the United States Department of Education as part of the National Blue Ribbon Schools Program, an award called the "most prestigious honor in the United States' education system" and which Education Secretary Arne Duncan described as honoring schools that "represent examples of educational excellence".

== Media ==
=== Newspapers ===
Millburn's first newspaper was The New Jersey Monitor, which was published in 1879 by Sydney Genung. The Monitor would be unable to financially compete in Millburn due to the Long Depression, and the opening of a much cheaper paper; The Budget which was opened the same year by A. S. Ovebmiller. The Monitor would eventually move to nearby Westfield in 1880. Unlike The Monitor which was printed in Madison and then shipped to Millburn residents, The Budget was printed in Millburn. However, The Budget would see competition from The Item, a smaller, higher-end newspaper that primarily targeted the Short Hills community and eventually drove The Budget out of business. The Item was opened in 1888 by Cf. Wright and is still in operation today.

== Transportation ==
=== Roads and highways ===
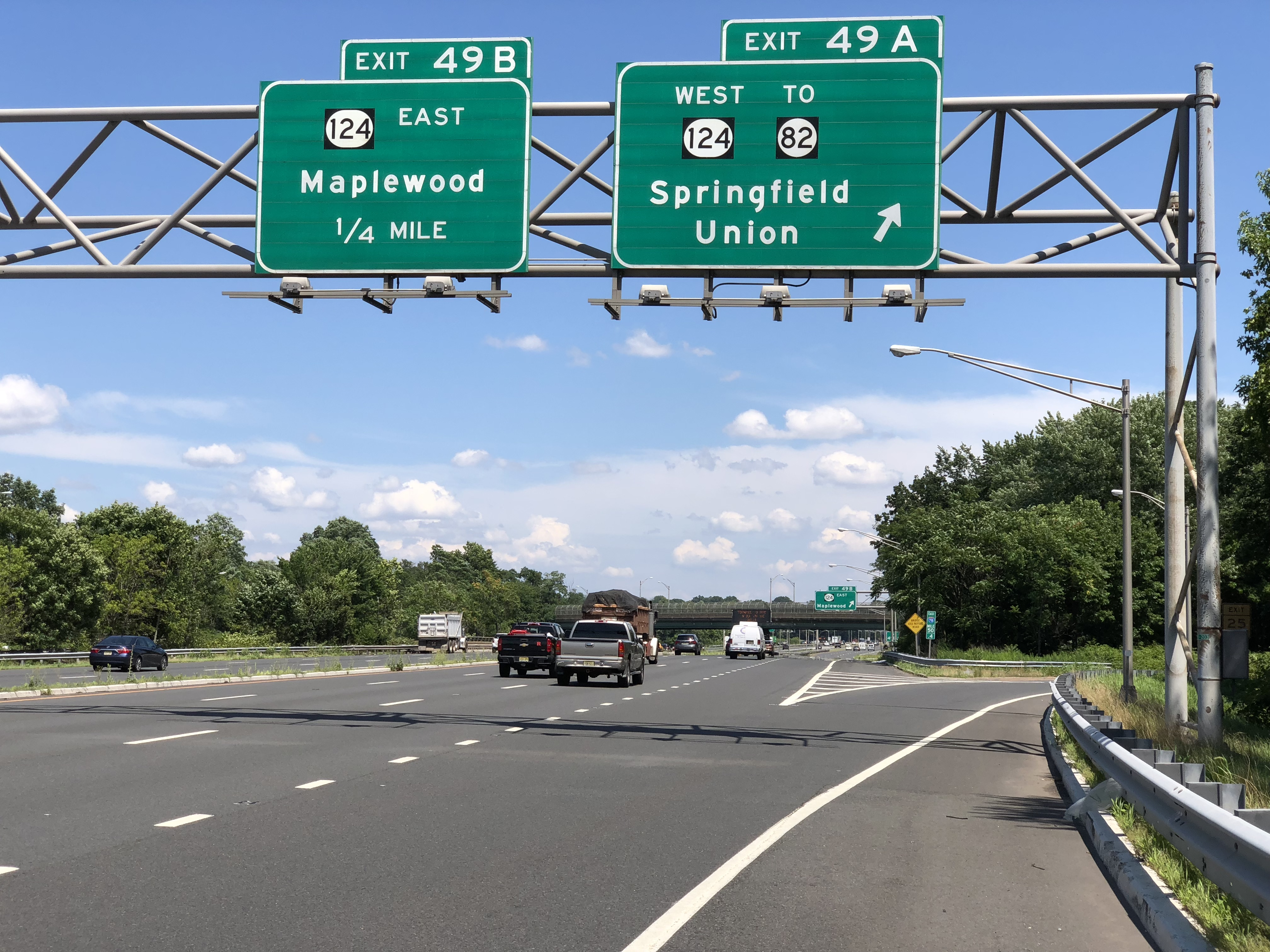
Interstate 78 eastbound on the edge of Millburn

As of May 2010, the township had a total of 100.77 miles (162.17 km) of roadways, of which 81.45 miles (131.08 km) were maintained by the municipality, 15.65 miles (25.19 km) by Essex County and 3.67 miles (5.91 km) by the New Jersey Department of Transportation.

A variety of roads serve Millburn. Major county routes include CR 510, CR 527 and CR 577. Route 24 and Route 124 also pass through along the southwestern border with Summit. Interstate 78 passes through the very southern tip of the township in the area of exit 49.

=== Public transportation ===
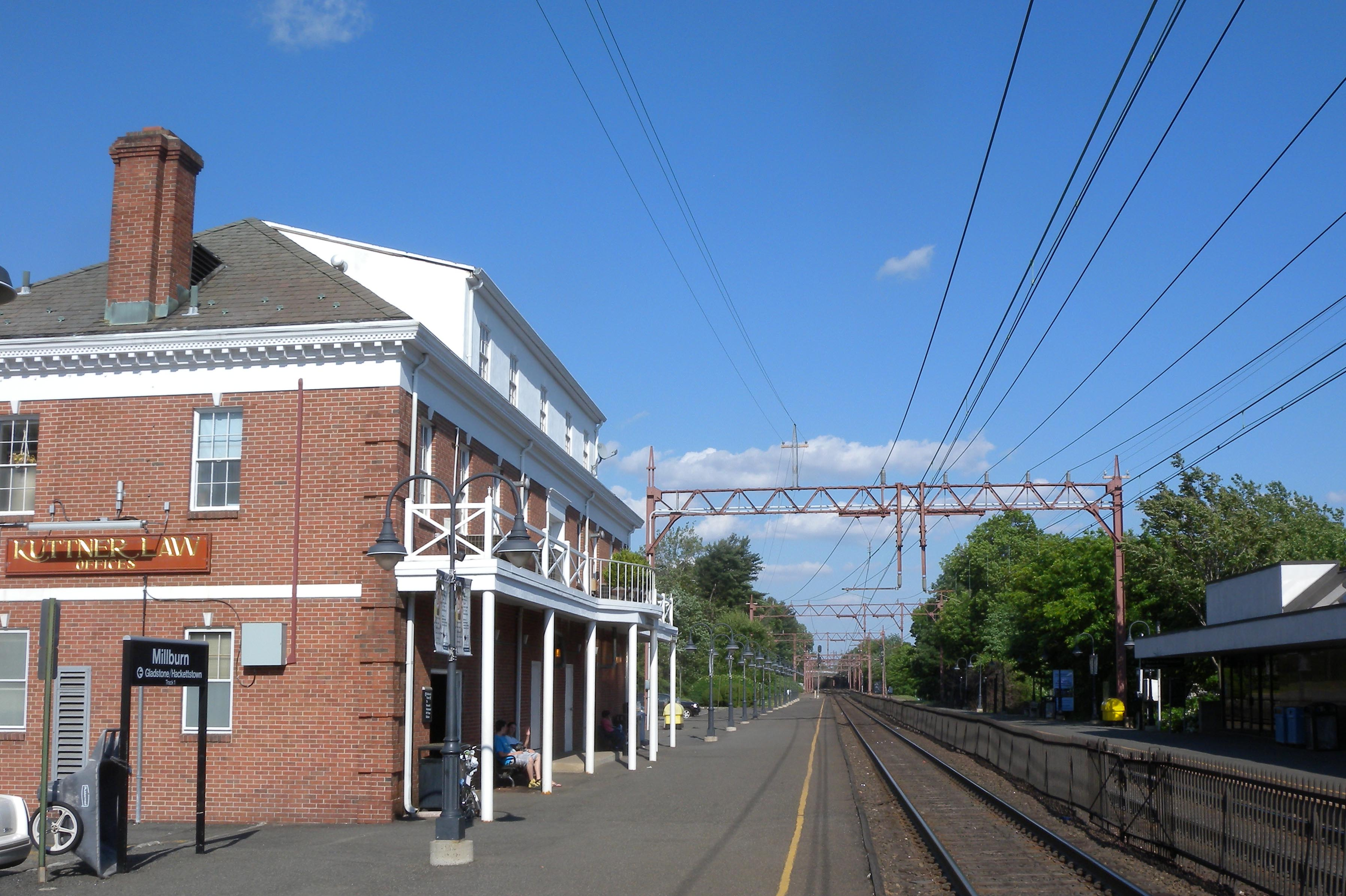
Millburn train station

Millburn Township is served by two NJ Transit railroad stations along the Morristown Line, providing service to Newark Broad Street Station, Secaucus Junction and New York Penn Station, as well as to Hoboken Terminal. The Millburn station is located at the intersection of Essex Street and Lackawanna Place near the Millburn Free Public Library, and the Short Hills station is located near The Crescent Street between Hobart Avenue and Chatham Road. The latter station is also the site of the Millburn-Short Hills Historical Society's museum.

New Jersey Transit operates bus service in the township, including the 70 route that stops at the Millburn railroad station on a route between Newark and Livingston, with local service on the 873 route.

== Notable people ==
People who were born in, residents of, or otherwise closely associated with Millburn include:

- Jabri Abdur-Rahim (born 2002), college basketball player for the Providence Friars
- J. Stewart Baker (1893–1966), banker who served as the first president of Chase Manhattan Bank
- Sean Baker (born 1971), Palme d'Or winning, Oscar nominated film director
- Craig Balsam, entertainment industry entrepreneur, Tony Award-winning theatrical producer and film producer
- Michael Lewis Becker (born 1940), advertising executive
- Lee Bickmore (1908–1986), chairman of the board and CEO of Nabisco
- Ruben Bolling (pseudonym for Ken Fisher, born c. 1963), cartoonist and the author of Tom the Dancing Bug
- Prince Lorenzo Borghese (born 1973), star of the 9th season of The Bachelor
- Courtney Brosnan (born 1995), professional soccer player who plays as a goalkeeper for Everton F.C. Women of the Women's Super League and the Republic of Ireland
- Scott Brunner (born 1957), former professional quarterback for the New York Giants
- Andrew Catalon (born 1980), sportscaster who has announced NFL on CBS, PGA Tour on CBS, College Basketball on CBS and NCAA March Madness
- Bill Chinnock (1947–2007), singer-songwriter and guitarist who was part of the Asbury Park music scene with Bruce Springsteen in the late 1960s
- Buzzy Cohen (born 1985), recording music industry executive and trivia enthusiast best known for his association with the game show Jeopardy!
- Ralph Cicerone (1943–2016), atmospheric scientist and administrator, who served as president of the National Academy of Sciences
- Richard Coogan (1914–2014), actor best known for playing the lead role in Captain Video and His Video Rangers
- Leon Cooperman (born 1943), businessman, investor and philanthropist who is chairman and CEO of Omega Advisors
- Freeman Craw (1917–2017), typeface designer
- Joseph P. Day (1874–1944), early land auctioneer and real-estate broker
- Ina Drew, former Chief Investment Officer at JP Morgan Chase who resigned following the 2012 JPMorgan Chase trading loss that resulted in billions in losses to the bank
- Barry Eisler (born 1964), novelist
- Pablo Eisenberg (1932–2022), scholar, social justice advocate and former tennis player
- Max Eisenbud (born 1972), sports agent specializing in tennis
- Daniel Errico, children's book author and children's media content creator who is the creator and executive producer of Hulu's kids TV series The Bravest Knight
- John Ferolito, the founder and current owner of Arizona Beverage Company
- James C. Fletcher (1919–1991), 4th and 7th Administrator of NASA
- William R. Forstchen (born 1950), author
- Martin S. Fox (1924–2020), publisher who served as President of the Jewish Telegraphic Agency
- Theodosia Garrison (1874–1944), poet who published frequently in popular magazines from the 1890s into the 1920s
- Max Greyserman (born 1995), professional golfer on the PGA Tour
- Grace Hartigan (1922–2008), Abstract Expressionist painter and a significant member of the New York School of the 1950s and 1960s
- Anne Hathaway (born 1982), actress
- Herbert G. Hopwood (1898–1966), Commander in chief of the United States Pacific Fleet from 1958 to 1960
- Ariel Horn (born c. 1979), novelist and teacher
- Dara Horn (born 1977), novelist and professor of literature
- Marty Horn (born 1963), former professional football player who was a quarterback for one season with the Philadelphia Eagles
- Mia Sinclair Jenness (born 2005), actress
- Elliott Kalan (born 1981), head writer for The Daily Show
- Peter Kellogg (born 1942), director of the Wall Street investment firm Spear, Leeds & Kellogg, which was sold to Goldman Sachs in 2000 for $5.5 billion
- Joe Kernen (born 1956), CNBC news anchor and host of Squawk Box
- Irwin I. Kimmelman (1930–2014), politician who served in both houses of the New Jersey Legislature and served as the Attorney General of New Jersey from 1982–1986
- Eileen Kraus (1938–2017), business executive who broke the glass ceiling to become the first woman to run a major bank in Connecticut
- Igor Larionov (born 1960), center who played for the New Jersey Devils
- Conor Leslie (born 1991), actress
- David Levithan (born 1972), young adult fiction author and editor
- Robert D. Lilley (1912–1986), businessman who served as the president of the American Telephone and Telegraph Company (AT&T) from 1972 to 1976
- Betty Liu (born 1973), Bloomberg TV anchor
- Monroe Jay Lustbader (1931–1996), politician who served in the New Jersey General Assembly from 1992 until his death, where he represented the 21st Legislative District
- Gus Mager (1878–1956), painter, illustrator and cartoonist
- Billy McFarland (born 1991), entrepreneur and founder of the Fyre Festival
- John C. McGinley (born 1959), actor
- Robert Mulcahy (1932–2022), athletic director at Rutgers University
- Maureen Ogden (1928–2022), seven-term member of the New Jersey General Assembly who served as Mayor of Millburn from 1979 to 1981
- C. Milford Orben (1898–1975), politician who served five terms in the New Jersey General Assembly
- Laura Overdeck, education reformer, author and philanthropist
- Julie Parsonnet, infectious disease expert
- Sondra Perl, Professor Emerita of English at Lehman College and director of the Ph.D. in Composition and Rhetoric at the Graduate Center of the City University of New York
- Belva Plain (1915–2010), author
- Mary Reckford (born 1992), rower who competed in the women's lightweight double sculls event at the 2020 Summer Olympics
- Brian Rolston (born 1973), professional hockey player
- Alex Rosenberg (born 1991), basketball player who plays for Hapoel Afula B.C. of the Israeli National League
- Peter Rost (born 1959), author, speaker, expert witness and drug industry whistleblower
- Bess Rous, actress
- Annie Russell (1864–1936), British-American theatrical actress
- Camille Sabie (1902–1998), athlete who represented the United States at the 1922 Women's World Games, winning gold medals in the 110 yd hurdles and standing long jump and a bronze medal in the conventional long jump
- James Solomon (born 1983/84), politician who is the mayor-elect of Jersey City, New Jersey
- Laura Sydell (born 1961), former senior technology reporter for Public Radio International's Marketplace, and a regular reporter on for National Public Radio's All Things Considered, Morning Edition and Weekend Edition
- Patti Stanger (born 1961), matchmaker
- Janet Sorg Stoltzfus, (1931–2004), educator, who established the Ta'iz Cooperative School, the first non-religious school in North Yemen
- Lisa Taddeo (born 1980), author and journalist known for her book Three Women
- Carl Van Duyne (1946–1983), sailor who competed in the Finn event at the 1968 Summer Olympics
- Peter Van Sant (born 1953), reporter on 48 Hours
- Arthur T. Vanderbilt (1888–1957), judge and judicial reformer who served as Chief Justice of the New Jersey Supreme Court from 1948 to 1957
- James Wallwork (1930–2024), politician who served in both houses of the New Jersey Legislature
- Wang Yung-ching (1917–2008), former CEO and co-founder of Formosa Plastics Group
- Thomas Watson Jr. (1914–1993), second President of IBM and United States Ambassador to the Soviet Union
- Joel Weingarten, former member of the New Jersey General Assembly
- Zygi Wilf (born 1950), owner of the Minnesota Vikings
- George C. Wilson (1927–2014), journalist who served as chief defense correspondent for The Washington Post from 1966 to 1990
- Rachel Zoe (born 1971), fashion stylist
- Alan Zweibel (born 1950), television producer and writer
