= Short Hills, New Jersey =

Place in Essex County, New Jersey, United States

- Census-designated place
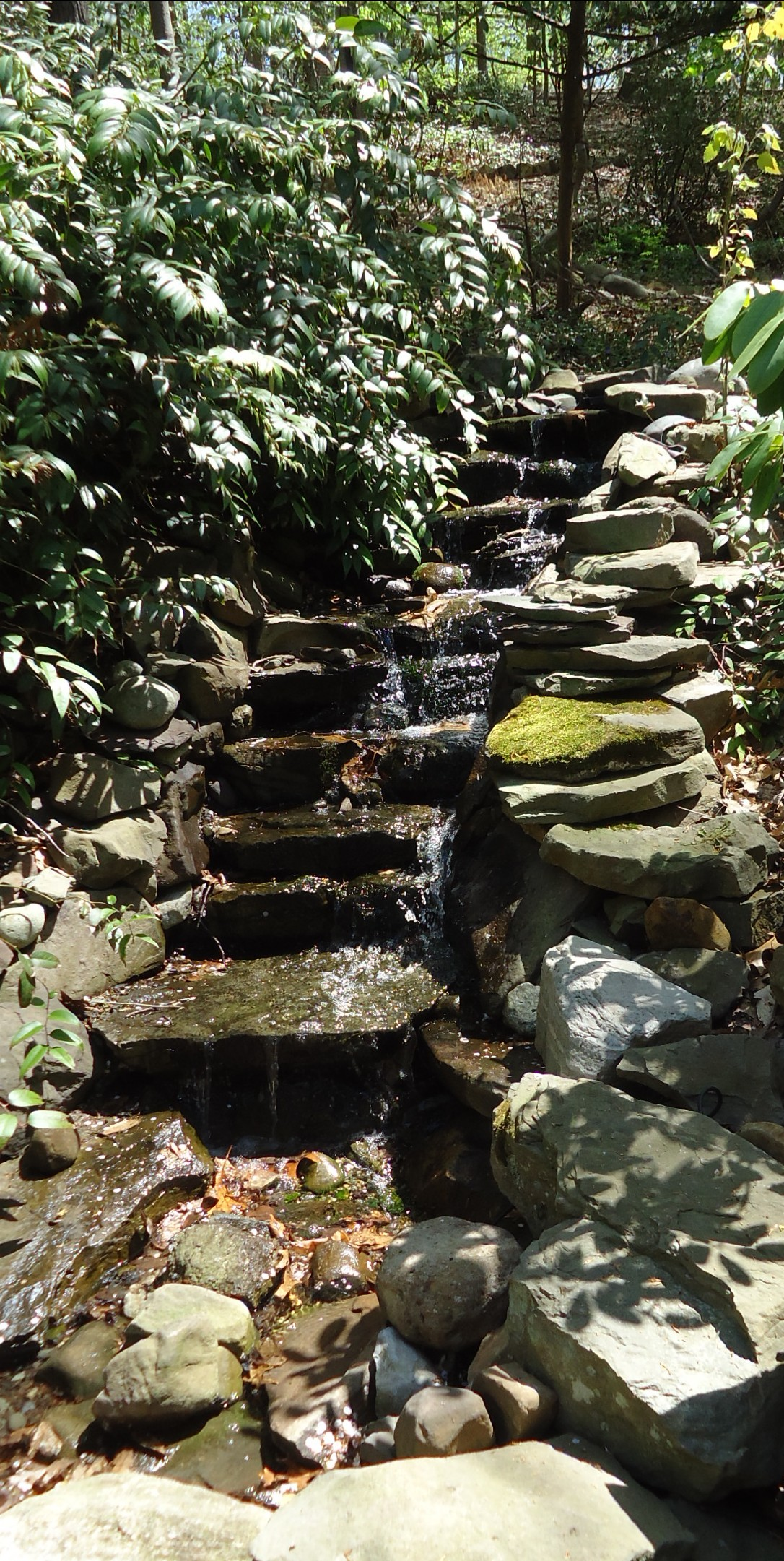
- Waterfall garden at the Hartshorn Arboretum in Short Hills

- Location of Short Hills in Essex County highlighted in right (red). Inset map: Location of Essex County in New Jersey highlighted in orange (left).

- Location in Essex County Location in New Jersey Location in the United States
- Coordinates: 40.739157°N 74.327442°W
- Country: United States
- State: New Jersey
- County: Essex
- Township: Millburn

Area
  - Total: 5.27 sq mi (13.64 km^{2})
  - Land: 5.25 sq mi (13.61 km^{2})
  - Water: 0.012 sq mi (0.03 km^{2}) 0.29%
- Elevation: 377 ft (115 m)

Population (2020)
  - Total: 14,422
  - Density: 2,743.4/sq mi (1,059.2/km^{2})

Economics
  - Median income: $250,000+ (2018-2022)
- Time zone: UTC−05:00 (Eastern (EST))
  - Summer (DST): UTC−04:00 (Eastern (EDT))
- ZIP Code: 07078
- FIPS code: 34-67320
- GNIS feature ID: 02584025

Short Hills is an unincorporated community and census-designated place (CDP) situated within Millburn, in Essex County, within the U.S. state of New Jersey, and part of the New York metropolitan area. The community is a commuter town for residents who work in Manhattan. As of the 2020 census, the CDP's population was 14,422.

In the Forbes magazine's rankings of the Most Expensive ZIP Codes in the United States, Short Hills was listed among the top 100 nationwide, coming in 66th in 2006 (with a median sale price of $1,200,000) and 67th in 2012 (median of $1,951,846). The median household income in Short Hills, according to the United States Census Bureau, exceeded $250,000 in the period from 2018-2022, while per capita income, as of the 2020 United States Census, was $153,124.

Short Hills is home to the upscale Mall at Short Hills, also known as the Short Hills Mall, located near affluent communities in neighboring Morris and Union counties along the Passaic River.

== History ==
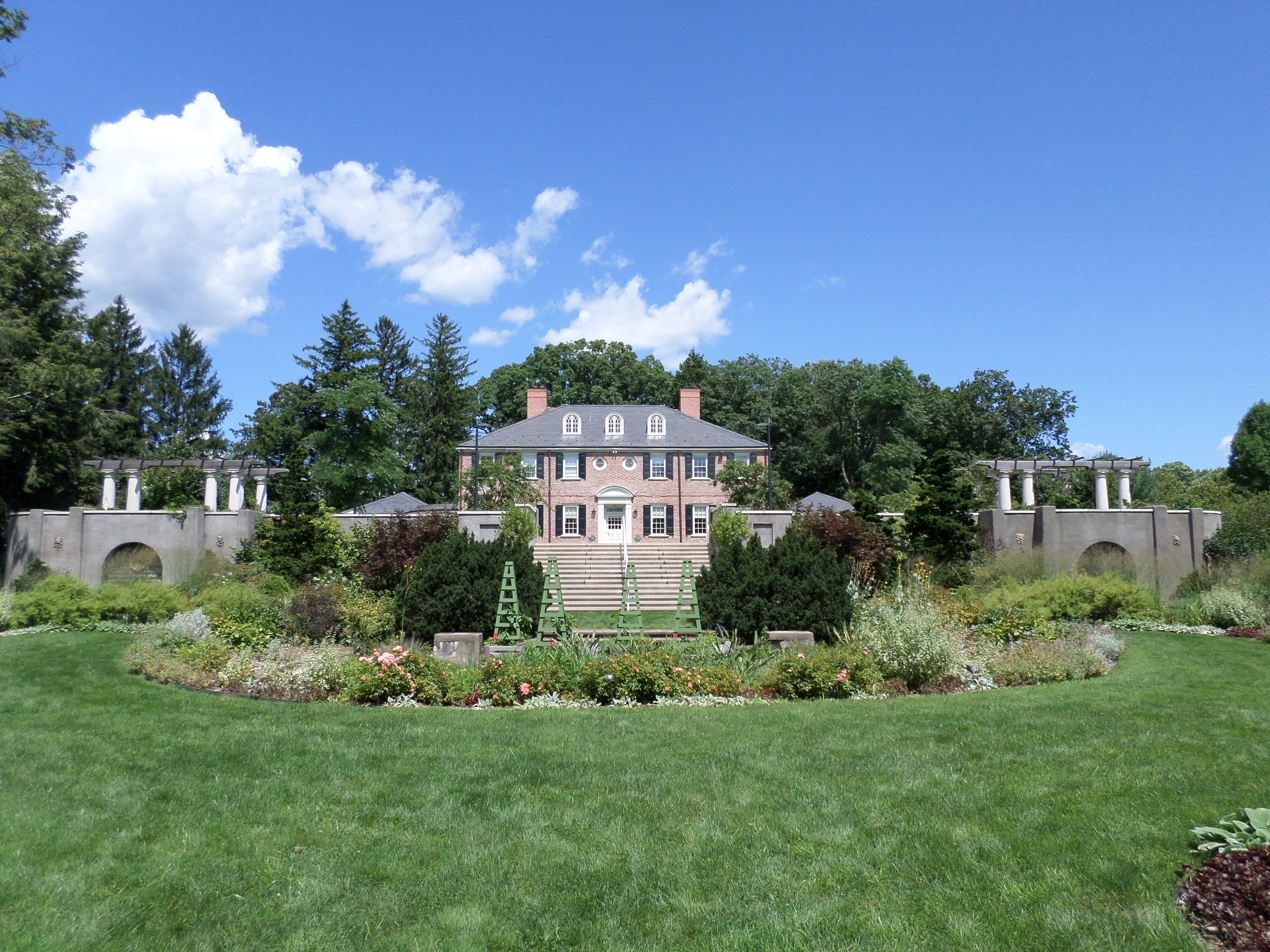
The Greenwood House and Gardens

=== 18th century ===
The area that became Short Hills was initially part of Springfield Township, and its eponymous hills are thought to have played a role in the movement of the Continental Army under George Washington during the Battle of Springfield (June 23, 1780). While troops may have been present in the area, the Battle of Short Hills (June 26, 1777) took place in Scotch Plains and Metuchen.

Short Hills began as a planned community when Stewart Hartshorn, who became wealthy from developing, perfecting, and manufacturing the self-acting shade roller, purchased 13 acres (53,000 m^{2}) of land in the township of Millburn, near the present Hobart Avenue, Parsonage Hill Road, and Chatham Road. Hartshorn intended to create "a harmonious community for people who appreciated nature," and "where natural beauty would not be destroyed by real estate developments, and where people of congenial tastes could dwell together." He later increased his land holdings to 56 acres (230,000 m^{2}) for himself and 1,552 acres (6.28 km^{2}) for the whole village, with each plot not owned by Hartshorn being no larger than 1/2 acre.

Hartshorn chose the name "Short Hills" because it reflected the topography of the region, and also because the local Lenape Native Americans used that same name to describe the region. One local resident suggested that he call his village "Hartshornville," but he refused, quietly content with Short Hills sharing his initials.

=== 19th century ===
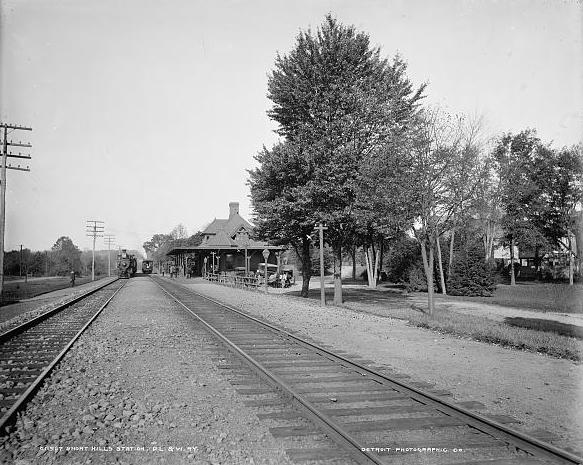
Short Hills station on the Delaware, Lackawanna and Western Railroad, c. 1895

Hartshorn situated his ideal town near enough to a railroad to allow for an easy commute to Hoboken and, from there, to New York City. Hence, his decision in 1879 to build, at his own expense, a railroad station along the original Morris and Essex Railroad line. He also persuaded the United States Post Office to open a branch in his new railroad station in 1880, and in fact, the Post Office has always had a presence in Short Hills from that day, as well as its own ZIP Code, 07078.

Hartshorn deliberately preserved strips of land along the railroad right-of-way from any development west of Old Short Hills Road. These strips separate Hobart Avenue to the north, and Chatham Road to the south, from the railway line. The only structure that has ever stood directly adjacent to the line is the railroad station.

=== 20th century ===
In 1944, the Hartshorn family also donated Crescent Park to the township of Millburn, directly across from the station, with the stipulation that the park always remain open to the public.

After 17 houses were erected, Hartshorn turned his attention to other common elements, including a music hall, which later became the Short Hills Racquets Club.

Stewart Hartshorn died in 1937 at the age of 97. His daughter Cora survived him, wrote her own history of the hamlet, and helped establish the Arboretum that bears her name.

In 1968, Temple B'nai Jeshurun relocated from Newark to a 21-acre (8.5 ha) site in Short Hills. It is the oldest Reform Jewish congregation in New Jersey and, with 1,100 member families, was one of the largest Jewish congregations in the state at the time of the move. Most of the property was purchased from Congressman Robert Kean, father of future New Jersey governor Thomas Kean. The land had originally been given to Kean's family by King George III.

In 1975, the Millburn-Short Hills Historical Society was formed in conjunction with the American Bicentennial celebrations. The opening of the Kearny Connection in 1996, establishing direct rail service to Penn Station in Midtown Manhattan, enhanced real-estate values immensely.

=== 21st century ===
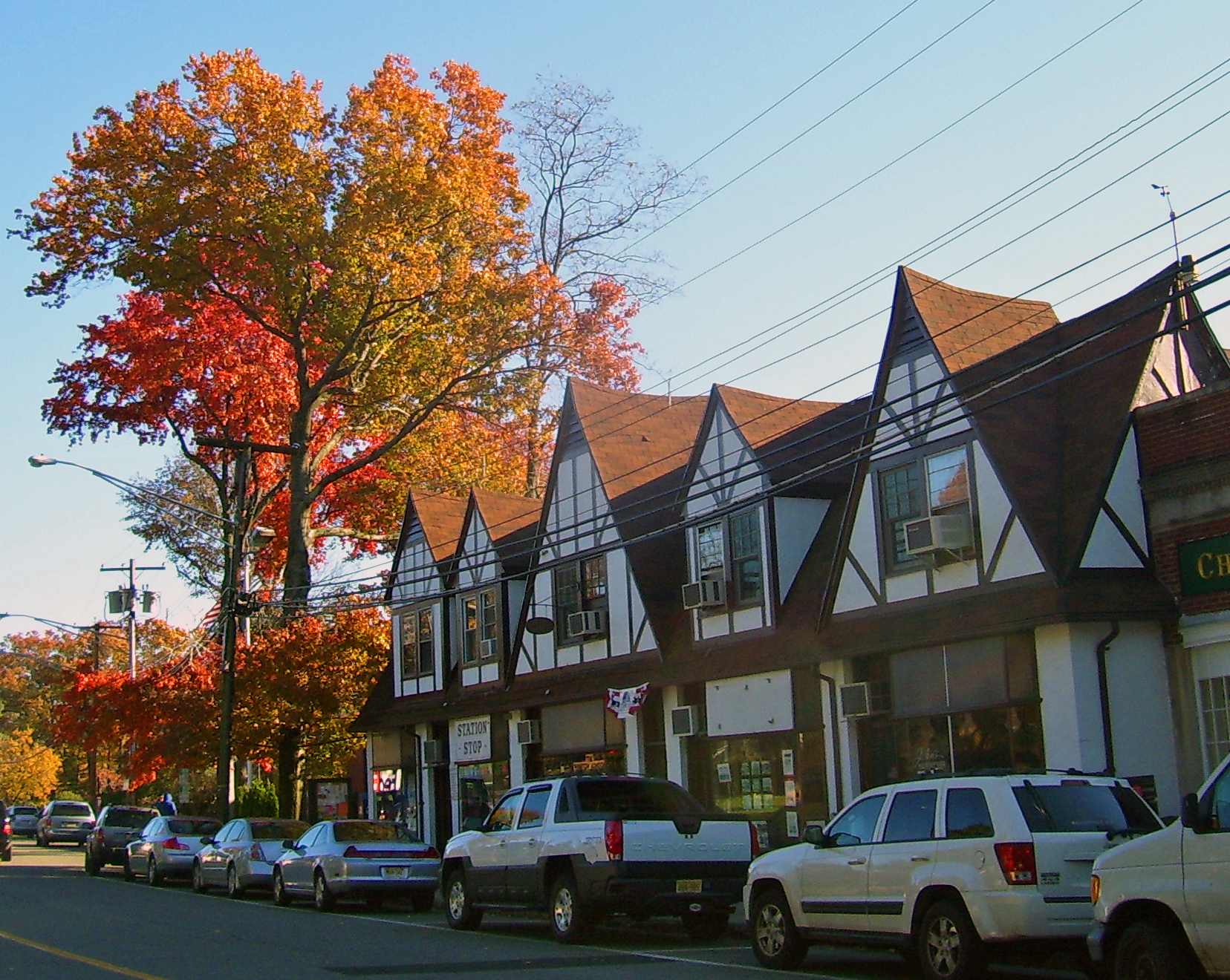
Downtown Short Hills in 2007

In 2001, the Christopher and Dana Reeve Paralysis Resource Center opened in Short Hills.

In 2011, the historic Greenwood Gardens opened to the public. Covering 28 acres (11 ha), it is one of sixteen garden preservation projects in the United States that is overseen by the Garden Conservancy.

In 2002, local residents planted a memorial tree on the grounds of the railroad station, to honor those of their neighbors who died in the attacks on September 11, 2001 terrorist attacks. A public 9/11 memorial at Crescent Park near the Short Hills train station was dedicated in 2021 to mark the 20th anniversary of the attack; Designed by a local artist and made up of 420 steel rings to commemorate the first responders and eight Millburn residents who were killed, the memorial includes two pieces of steel retrieved from the World Trade Center.

The median family income was over $200,000 in the 2010 census, and as of the 2020 census, exceeded $250,000. Dun & Bradstreet has its headquarters in Short Hills.

Short Hills remains a part of the Township of Millburn, and has been a part of it since its inception. Short Hills has its own railroad station and post office branch that are part of a downtown business area that is smaller than downtown Millburn. Located along Chatham Road near the Short Hills station, it includes a pharmacy, small eateries, and specialty shops. The train station waiting room operates as a bar and grill during the evening hours and a newsstand and ticket agent are present from early morning hours until noon.

== Geography ==
According to the U.S. Census Bureau, Short Hills had a total area of 5.211 square miles (13.497 km^{2}), including 5.196 square miles (13.459 km^{2}) of land and 0.015 square miles (0.039 km^{2}) of water (0.29%).

=== Climate ===
The climate in this area is characterized by hot, humid summers and generally cool to cold winters. According to the Köppen Climate Classification system, Short Hills has a humid continental climate, abbreviated "Dfa" on climate maps.

Climate data for Short Hills, New Jersey (Canoe Brook Country Club) 1991–2020 normals, extremes 1931–present
Month	Jan	Feb	Mar	Apr	May	Jun	Jul	Aug	Sep	Oct	Nov	Dec	Year
Record high °F (°C)	73 (23)	79 (26)	89 (32)	96 (36)	97 (36)	103 (39)	107 (42)	104 (40)	100 (38)	94 (34)	84 (29)	76 (24)	107 (42)
Mean daily maximum °F (°C)	39.5 (4.2)	41.8 (5.4)	49.8 (9.9)	62.4 (16.9)	72.3 (22.4)	81.5 (27.5)	86.3 (30.2)	84.7 (29.3)	77.9 (25.5)	65.6 (18.7)	54.2 (12.3)	44.1 (6.7)	63.3 (17.4)
Daily mean °F (°C)	30.7 (−0.7)	32.4 (0.2)	40.2 (4.6)	51.5 (10.8)	61.4 (16.3)	70.7 (21.5)	76.0 (24.4)	74.2 (23.4)	67.1 (19.5)	54.9 (12.7)	44.5 (6.9)	35.9 (2.2)	53.3 (11.8)
Mean daily minimum °F (°C)	21.9 (−5.6)	23.0 (−5.0)	30.6 (−0.8)	40.5 (4.7)	50.4 (10.2)	59.9 (15.5)	65.6 (18.7)	63.7 (17.6)	56.3 (13.5)	44.1 (6.7)	34.8 (1.6)	27.6 (−2.4)	43.2 (6.2)
Record low °F (°C)	−25 (−32)	−26 (−32)	−6 (−21)	12 (−11)	25 (−4)	31 (−1)	41 (5)	35 (2)	26 (−3)	13 (−11)	−5 (−21)	−16 (−27)	−26 (−32)
Average precipitation inches (mm)	3.53 (90)	2.96 (75)	4.19 (106)	4.03 (102)	4.05 (103)	4.77 (121)	4.68 (119)	4.94 (125)	4.64 (118)	4.58 (116)	3.60 (91)	4.43 (113)	50.40 (1,280)
Average snowfall inches (cm)	5.8 (15)	8.4 (21)	4.6 (12)	0.4 (1.0)	0.0 (0.0)	0.0 (0.0)	0.0 (0.0)	0.0 (0.0)	0.0 (0.0)	0.0 (0.0)	0.7 (1.8)	4.1 (10)	24.0 (61)
Average precipitation days (≥ 0.01 in)	9.5	8.1	9.7	11.5	12.3	11.0	11.1	10.8	9.5	10.8	8.6	9.8	122.7
Average snowy days (≥ 0.1 in)	2.5	2.7	1.7	0.1	0.0	0.0	0.0	0.0	0.0	0.0	0.2	1.4	8.6
Source: NOAA

== Demographics ==
Historical population
Census	Pop.	Note	%±
1990	12,541		—
2000	13,266		5.8%
2010	13,165		−0.8%
2020	14,422		9.5%
U.S. Decennial Census; 1950 1960 1970; 1980 1990 2000; 2010 2020

According to Forbes magazine, the median income in Short Hills is $229,222 (2016).

Short Hills first appeared as a census designated place in the 2010 U.S. census formed from part of the deleted whole-township Millford CDP.

=== Racial and ethnic composition ===
Short Hills CDP, New Jersey – Racial and ethnic composition Note: the US Census treats Hispanic/Latino as an ethnic category. This table excludes Latinos from the racial categories and assigns them to a separate category. Hispanics/Latinos may be of any race.
Race / Ethnicity (NH = Non-Hispanic)	Pop 2010	Pop 2020	% 2010	% 2020
White alone (NH)	10,449	8,138	79.37%	56.43%
Black or African American alone (NH)	121	196	0.92%	1.36%
Native American or Alaska Native alone (NH)	0	0	0.00%	0.00%
Asian alone (NH)	2,033	4,960	15.44%	34.39%
Native Hawaiian or Pacific Islander alone (NH)	2	1	0.02%	0.01%
Other race alone (NH)	13	92	0.10%	0.64%
Mixed race or Multiracial (NH)	231	578	1.75%	4.01%
Hispanic or Latino (any race)	316	457	2.40%	3.17%
Total	13,165	14,422	100.00%	100.00%

=== 2020 census ===
As of the 2020 census, Short Hills had a population of 14,422. The median age was 41.0 years. 31.1% of residents were under the age of 18 and 11.8% of residents were 65 years of age or older. For every 100 females there were 97.8 males, and for every 100 females age 18 and over there were 93.9 males age 18 and over.

100.0% of residents lived in urban areas, while 0.0% lived in rural areas.

There were 4,335 households in Short Hills, of which 54.8% had children under the age of 18 living in them. Of all households, 80.6% were married-couple households, 6.3% were households with a male householder and no spouse or partner present, and 11.8% were households with a female householder and no spouse or partner present. About 9.6% of all households were made up of individuals and 5.0% had someone living alone who was 65 years of age or older.

There were 4,543 housing units, of which 4.6% were vacant. The homeowner vacancy rate was 1.4% and the rental vacancy rate was 4.2%.

=== 2010 census ===
The 2010 United States census counted 13,165 people, 4,146 households, and 3,682 families in the CDP. The population density was 2,533.5 per square mile (978.2/km^{2}). There were 4,292 housing units at an average density of 826.0 per square mile (318.9/km^{2}). The racial makeup was 81.44% (10,721) White, 0.96% (127) Black or African American, 0.01% (1) Native American, 15.48% (2,038) Asian, 0.02% (2) Pacific Islander, 0.26% (34) from other races, and 1.84% (242) from two or more races. Hispanic or Latino of any race were 2.40% (316) of the population.

Of the 4,146 households, 54.1% had children under the age of 18; 81.4% were married couples living together; 5.5% had a female householder with no husband present and 11.2% were non-families. Of all households, 9.9% were made up of individuals and 5.7% had someone living alone who was 65 years of age or older. The average household size was 3.18 and the average family size was 3.40.

34.4% of the population were under the age of 18, 3.5% from 18 to 24, 19.2% from 25 to 44, 31.6% from 45 to 64, and 11.1% who were 65 years of age or older. The median age was 41.3 years. For every 100 females, the population had 96.1 males. For every 100 females ages 18 and older there were 92.3 males.

The Census Bureau's 2006–2010 American Community Survey showed that (in 2010 inflation-adjusted dollars) median household income was $211,989 (with a margin of error of +/- $13,467) and the median family income was $227,262 (+/- $22,938). Males had a median income of $192,625 (+/- $33,436) versus $98,214 (+/- $12,561) for females. The per capita income for the CDP was $100,875 (+/- $7,868). About 0.6% of families and 0.7% of the population were below the poverty line, including 0.7% of those under age 18 and none of those age 65 or over.

== Education ==
Short Hills has five K-4 elementary schools that are part of the Millburn Township Public Schools: Deerfield Elementary School, Glenwood Elementary School, Hartshorn Elementary School, South Mountain Elementary School and Wyoming Elementary School. For fifth grade, students attend the Washington School. Students move on to complete their public school education at Millburn Middle School for grades 6–8 and Millburn High School for grades 9–12.

Short Hills is also home to a private day school, Far Brook School, which serves students in nursery through eighth grade, and Pingry School Lower Campus for grades K-5. Short Hills is also home to the Winston School of short hills for grades 2-8.

== Media references ==
Philip Roth's first book, Goodbye, Columbus, is mostly set in Short Hills, the home of Neil Klugman's girlfriend and her family.

In the 1979 Miloš Forman film adaption of the musical Hair, the female lead, Sheila, played by Beverly D'Angelo, is a debutante from Short Hills and part of the film is set there.

In the television series, House, starring Hugh Laurie, Stacy Warner (Sela Ward), the ex-girlfriend of the lead character, lives in Short Hills and some scenes in the series were set in her home there.

Short Hills is covered by HomeTowne TV, based in Summit, which provides local programming and highlights the community.

The local newspapers are The Item of Millburn and The Millburn Patch, and The Star-Ledger. New York City's three largest metropolitan newspapers, The New York Times, New York Post and New York Daily News are also available for home delivery.

== Notable people ==
People who were born in, residents of, or otherwise closely associated with Short Hills include:

- Jabri Abdur-Rahim (born 2002), college basketball player for the Georgia Bulldogs
- J. Stewart Baker (1893–1966), banker who served as the first president of Chase Manhattan Bank
- Sean Baker (born 1971), Palme d'Or winning, Oscar nominated film director
- Lee Bickmore (1908–1986), chairman of the board and CEO of Nabisco
- Ruben Bolling (pseudonym for Ken Fisher, born c. 1963), cartoonist and the author of Tom the Dancing Bug
- Courtney Brosnan (born 1995), professional soccer player who plays as a goalkeeper for West Ham United F.C. Women of the Women's Super League
- Andrew Catalon (born 1980), sportscaster who has announced NFL on CBS, PGA Tour on CBS, College Basketball on CBS and NCAA March Madness
- Ralph Cicerone (1943–2016) atmospheric scientist and administrator, who served as president of the National Academy of Sciences
- Richard Coogan (1914–2014), actor best known for playing the lead role in Captain Video and His Video Rangers
- Leon Cooperman (born 1943), businessman, investor and philanthropist who is chairman and CEO of Omega Advisors
- Freeman Craw (1917–2017), typeface designer
- Joseph P. Day (1874–1944), early land auctioneer and real-estate broker
- Ina Drew, former Chief Investment Officer at JP Morgan Chase who resigned following the 2012 JPMorgan Chase trading loss that resulted in billions in losses to the bank
- Barry Eisler (born 1964), novelist
- Max Eisenbud (born 1972), sports agent specializing in tennis
- Daniel Errico, children's book author and children's media content creator who is the creator and executive producer of Hulu's kids TV series The Bravest Knight
- John Ferolito, founder and owner of Arizona Beverage Company
- Theodosia Garrison (1874–1944), poet who published frequently in popular magazines from the 1890s into the 1920s
- Max Greyserman (born 1995), professional golfer on the PGA Tour
- Anne Hathaway (born 1982), actress
- Herbert G. Hopwood (1898–1966) four-star admiral in the United States Navy
- Ariel Horn, novelist and teacher
- Dara Horn (born 1977), novelist and professor of literature
- Marty Horn (born 1963), former professional football player who was a quarterback for one season with the Philadelphia Eagles
- Peter Kellogg (born 1942), director of the Wall Street investment firm Spear, Leeds & Kellogg
- Joe Kernen (born 1956), CNBC news anchor and host of Squawk Box
- Eileen Kraus (1938–2017), business executive and president of Connecticut National Bank
- Igor Larionov (born 1960), center who played for the New Jersey Devils
- David Levithan (born 1972) young adult fiction author and editor
- Robert D. Lilley (1912–1986), businessman who served as the president of the American Telephone and Telegraph Company (AT&T) from 1972 to 1976
- Billy McFarland (born 1991), entrepreneur, convicted fraudster and founder of the Fyre Festival
- John C. McGinley (born 1959), actor known for his role playing Dr. Perry Cox on Scrubs
- Belva Plain (1919–2010), author
- Corey Rae, transgender rights activist, writer, actress, and model
- Mary Reckford (born 1992), rower who competed in the women's lightweight double sculls event at the 2020 Summer Olympics
- Brian Rolston (born 1973), professional hockey player for the New Jersey Devils
- Alex Rosenberg (born 1991), basketball player who plays for Hapoel Afula B.C. of the Israeli National League
- Bess Rous, actress
- Cory Schneider (born 1986), goalie for the New Jersey Devils
- Patti Stanger (born 1961), matchmaker and producer of Millionaire Matchmaker
- Janet Sorg Stoltzfus, (1931–2004), educator, who established the Ta'iz Cooperative School, the first non-religious school in north Yemen
- Lisa Taddeo (born 1980), author and journalist known for her book Three Women
- Peter Van Sant (born 1953), reporter 48 Hours
- James Wallwork (1930–2024), politician who served in both houses of the New Jersey Legislature
- Wang Yung-ching (1917–2008), former CEO and co-founder of Formosa Plastics Group
- Thomas Watson Jr. (1914–1993), second President of IBM and United States Ambassador to the Soviet Union
- Zygi Wilf (born 1950), owner of the Minnesota Vikings
- Rachel Zoe (born 1971), fashion stylist
- Alan Zweibel (born 1950), producer and writer for stage and television productions such as Saturday Night Live

== Points of interest ==
- Cora Hartshorn Arboretum and Bird Sanctuary
- Greenwood Gardens
- Paper Mill Playhouse
- Old Short Hills Park
- Gero Park – Swimming, Baseball, Municipal Golf Course
- Saint Stephen's Cemetery and The Chapel at Short Hills - Saint Stephen's Cemetery has been serving NJ residents since 1858. The Chapel at Short Hills was later added to accommodate above-ground burials.
- The Mall at Short Hills – a mall with a gross leasable area of 1,342,000 square feet (124,700 m^{2}), placing it among the ten largest shopping malls in New Jersey.
