= Daniel Errico =

American children's author and producer

Daniel J. Errico is an American children's book author and children's media content creator. He is the creator and executive producer of Hulu's kids TV series The Bravest Knight. He has also published several children's books, including the Journey of the Marmabill, the Journey of the Noble Gnarble, and the Bravest Knight Who Ever Lived, from which the TV show was developed.

In 2020, his show The Bravest Knight earned a GLAAD Media Award for Outstanding Kids and Family Programming.

He is the founder of www.freechildrenstories.com, where many of his children's stories are available to the public.

Errico is from the Short Hills section of Millburn, New Jersey and graduated from Villanova University before moving to Princeton, New Jersey. He currently resides in Pittsburgh, Pennsylvania.
