= Robert D. Lilley (businessman) =

American businessman (1912–1986)

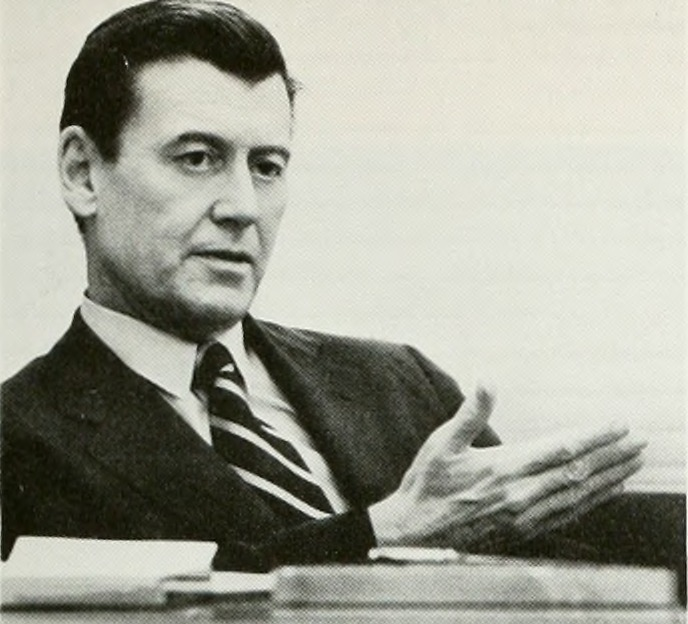
- Lilley in 1972
- Born: 1912; New York City, U.S.A.
- Died: 1986 (aged 73–74)
- Education: Columbia College
- Occupation: President of at&t (1972–1976)

Robert Dodd Lilley (1912–1986) was an American businessman who was the president of the American Telephone and Telegraph Company (AT&T) from 1972 to 1976 and president of the New Jersey Bell Telephone Company from 1965 to 1970.

== Biography ==
Lilley was born in New York City in 1912. He graduated from Columbia College with a B.A. in 1933, a B.S. in 1934 and an E.M. in 1935 from Columbia University School of Engineering. He began his career in the telephone industry after joining Western Electric as an assistant engineer and worked in the Bell System before ascending the ranks to become its second most senior executive.

=== The Lilley Commission ===
Lilley was most known for chairing the Governor's Select Commission for the Study of Civil Disorder in New Jersey, created by New Jersey Governor Richard J. Hughes in 1967 in the wake of the 1967 Newark riots. The commission, charged with the study of civil disorders, later became known as the "Lilley Commission" after its chairman. The comiission's report highlighted racial inequalities between the African American and white communities, exposed corruption in the local government, and offered policy recommendations such as improving hiring practices that benefit disadvantaged communities and changing leadership positions in the power structures. For his work, he received a National Conference of Christians and Jews Award in 1968.

=== Public service ===
Lilley was also active in public affairs. He served as the chairman of the Local Initiatives Support Corporation from 1980 to 1983 as well as the President's Task Force on Private Sector Initiatives, appointed by Ronald Reagan.

He served on the Board of Trustees of Columbia University from 1968 to 1980. A resident of the Short Hills section of Millburn, New Jersey, he died in 1986 after a heart attack.
