= Corey Rae =

American actress and transgender rights activist

- Born: Los Angeles, California, U.S.
- Education: Hofstra University
- Occupations: activist writer actress model
- Spouse: Lyle Seebeck (m. 2024)
- Website: coreyrae.com

Corey Rae is an American transgender rights activist, actress, writer, and model.

== Early life ==
Rae was born into a Jewish family in Los Angeles, California. She was raised in Short Hills, New Jersey by her single mother. A transgender woman, she transitioned as a high school student at Millburn High School and was elected prom queen. Rae lived "stealth" while a college student at Hofstra University, keeping her transgender identity a secret from her friends. Rae did not consider herself as a member of the LGBT Community until Caitlyn Jenner came out as a transgender woman in 2015, and did not publicly disclose her transgender identity until 2016, following the Pulse nightclub shooting. In 2012, she underwent gender reassignment surgery.

== Career and public image ==
Rae created an online blog, where she wrote an entry titled Allow Me to Reintroduce Myself, opening up the effects the Pulse nightclub shooting had on her life. Following the creation of the blog, Rae became an active transgender rights activist. In November 2018, she spoke during the Trans March in Los Angeles.

She wrote a monthly column for Style Caster. She is also a model.

In 2019, Rae received media attention for attending the 2019 Golden Globes with Amber Heard.

== Personal life ==
On June 15, 2024, Rae married Lyle Seebeck, a senior technical account manager, in a private Jewish ceremony at his family's estate in the northern suburbs of Chicago.

== Filmography ==
Year	Title	Role	Notes	Ref.
2019	To Be Me	Kouri	6 episodes	
2022	Millie & Maddie	Logan	2 episodes	
