= Marty Horn =

American football player (born 1963)

No. 13, 14
- Position: Quarterback

Personal information
- Born: November 14, 1963 (age 62); Orange, New Jersey, U.S.
- Listed height: 6 ft 2 in (1.88 m)
- Listed weight: 205 lb (93 kg)

Career information
- High school: Millburn (Millburn, New Jersey)
- College: Lehigh
- NFL draft: 1986: undrafted

Career history
- New York Giants (1986)*; New York Jets (1986-1987)*; Philadelphia Eagles (1987)
- * Offseason or practice squad member only

Career NFL statistics
- TD–INT: 0-0
- Passing yards: 68
- Passer rating: 65.7
- Stats at Pro Football Reference

Martin Louis Horn (born March 27, 1963) is an American former professional football player who was a quarterback for one season with the Philadelphia Eagles of the National Football League (NFL) in 1987. He played college football for the Lehigh Mountain Hawks.

== Early life ==
Horn was born in Orange, New Jersey and grew up in the Short Hills section of Millburn, New Jersey, where he attended Millburn High School. After graduating from Millburn he completed a postgraduate year at Milford Academy.

== College career ==
Horn was a four-year starter for the Lehigh Engineers, taking over as a freshman after the team's first-string quarterback was injured in a game against Penn. As a sophomore he was named an honorable mention All-American and finished third in Division I-AA in passer rating as a junior. Horn was named an honorable mention All-American again as a senior in 1985. He finished his collegiate career with 9,120 yards and 62 touchdowns, both school records.

== Professional career ==
Horn was signed by the New York Jets as an undrafted free agent in 1986 after a tryout with the team, but was cut during training camp. He was re-signed by the Jets during the 1987 offseason but was waived again at the end of the preseason. Horn was signed by the Philadelphia Eagles as a replacement player during the 1987 NFL players strike. He served as the backup to Scott Tinsley and appeared in one game, completing five of eleven passes for 68 yards in a 41–22 loss to the Dallas Cowboys on October 11, 1987. Horn was released after the strike ended.

== Personal life ==
After retiring from football Horn joined his brothers in running two restaurants owned by his family in West Orange, New Jersey. He also served as an analyst on Lehigh football broadcasts for 20 years. Horn is the offensive coordinator and quarterbacks coach at Madison High School and coached both of his sons.
