= Alex Rosenberg (basketball) =

American-Israeli basketball player (born 1991)

Alex Rosenberg אלכס רוזנברג
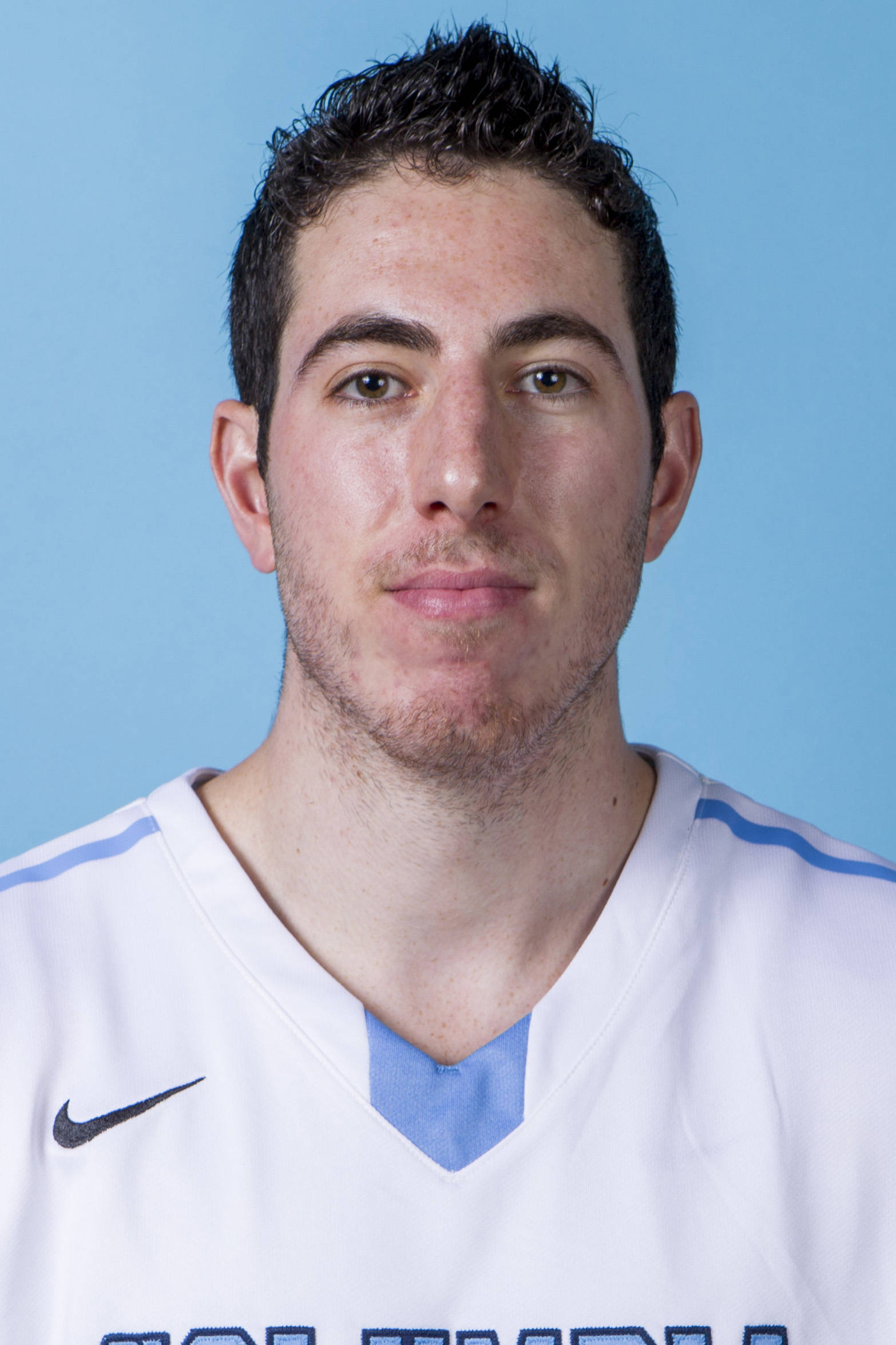
- Rosenberg (right) with Columbia University in 2016

Personal information
- Born: September 20, 1991 (age 35) Short Hills, New Jersey
- Listed height: 6 ft 7 in (2.01 m)
- Listed weight: 220 lb (100 kg)

Career information
- High school: Millburn (Millburn, New Jersey)
- College: Columbia (2011–2016)
- NBA draft: 2016: undrafted
- Playing career: 2016–present
- Position: Power forward

Career history
- 2016–2017: Maccabi Kiryat Gat
- 2017: Bnei Herzliya
- 2017–2018: Hapoel Afula

Career highlights
- All-Ivy League Honorable Mention (2016); 2× All-Ivy League First Team (2014, 2015)

Alex Rosenberg (Hebrew: אלכס רוזנברג; born September 20, 1991) is an American-Israeli former basketball player who last played for Hapoel Afula of the Liga Leumit. He played college basketball for Columbia University.

== High school and college career ==
Rosenberg attended Millburn High School in Millburn, New Jersey, where he was a three-year letterwinner, and two-time first team all-area. Alex is fourth on the all-time scoring list for Millburn High School.

Rosenberg went on to play one year of postgrad basketball at The Peddie School after high school. There, he averaged 14.0 ppg.

Rosenberg played college basketball for Columbia University's Lions. In his senior year at Columbia, he averaged 13.5 points, 4.1 rebounds and 1.9 assists per game.

On March 9, 2016, Rosenberg was named All-Ivy League Honorable Mention.

== Professional career ==
On July 20, 2016, Rosenberg started his professional career with Maccabi Kiryat Gat of the Israeli Premier League, signing a two-year deal. On May 8, 2017, Rosenberg recorded a season-high 18 points, shooting 7-of-11 from the field, along with four assists in a 101–95 win over Bnei Herzliya.

On July 23, 2017, Rosenberg signed a three-year deal with Bnei Herzliya. However, on December 28, 2017, Rosenberg parted ways with Herzliya and joined Hapoel Afula of the Liga Leumit for the rest of the season. In 19 games played for Afula, he averaged 16.2 points, 5 rebounds and 2.7 assists per game.

Rosenberg retired from professional basketball in 2018 after his season with Hapoel Afula.

== Personal life ==
Alex grew up in Short Hills, New Jersey. His father, Marc, played college basketball at Northeastern and Western New England College.
