= Ariel Horn =

American novelist and teacher

- Education: Millburn High School; University of Pennsylvania; New York University (MA)
- Occupations: Novelist; educator
- Relatives: Dara Horn (sister)

Ariel Horn Levenson is an American novelist and teacher. She is known for turning her job-finding difficulties as a new college graduate into a humorous novel: Help Wanted, Desperately.

== Biography ==
Horn grew up in the Short Hills section of Millburn, New Jersey, where she attended Millburn High School. She is a graduate of the University of Pennsylvania, where she was a columnist for The Daily Pennsylvanian. She studied for a Master of Arts degree in English at New York University. Horn has taught English at the Dalton School on Manhattan's Upper East Side, at the Joseph Kushner Hebrew Academy, and at a public charter school in upper Manhattan. Horn's sister, Dara Horn is also a novelist.

Horn has been a resident of Livingston, New Jersey.

== Help Wanted, Desperately ==
In the spring of 2002 Horn was in her senior year at the University of Pennsylvania and was being interviewed for an entry-level job with a New York management consulting firm.

Help Wanted, Desperately, follows a thinly fictionalized version of Horn, Alexa Hoffman, through "a roller coaster ride of job interviews" as a college senior. Her plan is to avoid going home to Short Hills, New Jersey after graduation at any cost. Her Plan B if all else fails is to go teach English on the Pacific island of Majuro. The novel "hilariously chronicle(s)" a series of job interviews that include earthworm breeder, Broadway actress, and deodorant sniffer. The novel was published by HarperCollins in 2004. Booklist wrote that Horn used her "own job-interviewing experiences for comic effect."

== Bibliography ==
- Horn, Ariel (2004). Help Wanted, Desperately (1st ed.). New York: HarperCollins. p. 341. ISBN 0-06-058958-2.
