= Millburn High School =

High school in Essex County, New Jersey, US

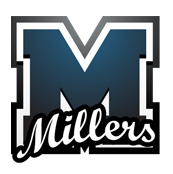

Location
- 462 Millburn Avenue; Millburn, Essex County, New Jersey 07041; United States; 40.72058°N 74.31572°W

Information
- Type: Public high school
- School district: Millburn Township Public Schools
- NCES School ID: 341020002148
- Principal: Robert B. Nixon Jr.
- Faculty: 132.7 FTEs
- Grades: 9-12
- Enrollment: 1,380 (as of 2024–25)
- Student to teacher ratio: 10.4:1
- Colors: Royal blue and white
- Athletics conference: Super Essex Conference (general); North Jersey Super Football Conference (football)
- Team name: Millers
- Rivals: Livingston High School
- Newspaper: The Miller
- Yearbook: Millwheel
- Website: mhs.millburn.org/o/mhs

Millburn High School is a four-year public high school serving students in ninth through twelfth grades from Millburn (including its Short Hills neighborhood), in Essex County, in the U.S. state of New Jersey, operating as the lone secondary school of the Millburn Township Public Schools. The school was honored with National Blue Ribbon School Award of Excellence in the 2007–08 school year and was named the top-ranked high school in the state in the September 2008 and 2010 issues of New Jersey Monthly.

As of the 2024–25 school year, the school had an enrollment of 1,380 students and 132.7 classroom teachers (on an FTE basis), for a student–teacher ratio of 10.4:1. There were 25 students (1.8% of enrollment) eligible for free lunch and 1 (0.1% of students) eligible for reduced-cost lunch.

== Demographics ==
As of the 2025–26 school year, the student body was 43.6% White, 42.5% Asian, 5.1% Hispanic and 3.0% African American.

== Awards, recognition and rankings ==
During the 2007–08 school year, Millburn School was recognized with the Blue Ribbon School Award of Excellence by the United States Department of Education, the highest award an American school can receive.

In its 2015 report on "America's Top High Schools", Newsweek ranked Millburn the #1 open-admission and #4 non-magnet school in the nation. It placed 13th overall in the U.S. and 8th in the state among all participating public high schools (including selective admission and magnet schools). All schools ranked above Millburn are magnet programs that use selective enrollment.

In its 2013 report on "America's Best High Schools", The Daily Beast ranked the school 69th in the nation among participating public high schools and 6th overall (and the highest-ranked non-magnet school) among schools in New Jersey. The school was ranked 83rd in the nation and fourth in New Jersey on the list of "America's Best High Schools 2012" prepared by The Daily Beast / Newsweek, with rankings based 25% each on graduation rate, matriculation rate for college and number of Advanced Placement / International Baccalaureate courses taken per student, with 10% based on average scores on the SAT / ACT, 10% on AP/IB scores and an additional 5% based on the number of AP/IB courses available to students; It was the highest-ranked open enrollment (non-selective / non-magnet) school in the state.

In the 2011 "Ranking America's High Schools" issue by The Washington Post, the school was ranked 4th in New Jersey and 236th nationwide. The school was ranked 170th in Newsweek's 2009 ranking of the top 1,500 high schools in the United States and was the second-ranked school in New Jersey, with 3.165 AP tests taken in 2008 per graduating senior and 56% of all graduating seniors passing at least one AP exam, after being ranked 151st in 2008. In Newsweek's 2007 ranking of the country's top high schools, Millburn High School was listed in 165th place, the third-highest ranked school in New Jersey. The school was 181st, sixth-highest in New Jersey, on Newsweek's May 8, 2006, list of 1,200 U.S. high schools. Millburn High School was ranked as Number 148 in Newsweek's 2005 rankings.

The school was the 5th-ranked public high school in New Jersey out of 339 schools statewide in New Jersey Monthly magazine's September 2014 cover story on the state's "Top Public High Schools", using a new ranking methodology. The school had been ranked 8th in the state of 328 schools in 2012, after being ranked 1st in 2010 out of 322 schools listed. The school had also ranked highest in the state in the magazine's 2008 report. The school was ranked 3rd in the magazine's 2006 rankings out of 316 schools included across the state.

Schooldigger.com ranked the school tied for 31st out of 381 public high schools statewide in its 2011 rankings (a decrease of 9 positions from the 2010 ranking) which were based on the combined percentage of students classified as proficient or above proficient on the mathematics (93.5%) and language arts literacy (98.5%) components of the High School Proficiency Assessment (HSPA).

In 2005–06, the school averaged an 1860 combined SAT score, seventh highest of all public high schools statewide and the highest score for any non-magnet general admission high school.

In 1998, Jay Mathews, an author and education reporter, named Millburn High School the second-best public school in the country, according to ratios of students taking AP exams.

In January 2021, a team of students from Millburn High School was chosen as a Top Team in App Development Challenge (ADC) of NASA headed by the Office of STEM Engagement of the Johnson Space Center.

Reports from the school year 2020-2021 show that Millburn High School had the highest SAT scores of any non-magnet public school in the state, with average SAT scores of 1358.

== Athletics ==
The Millburn High School Millers compete in the Super Essex Conference, which is comprised of public and private high schools in Essex County and was established following a reorganization of sports leagues in Northern New Jersey by the New Jersey State Interscholastic Athletic Association (NJSIAA). Prior to the 2010 realignment, the school had competed in the Skyline Division of the Northern Hills Conference. With 1,047 students in grades 10–12, the school was classified by the NJSIAA for the 2019–20 school year as Group III for most athletic competition purposes, which included schools with an enrollment of 761 to 1,058 students in that grade range. The football team competes in the Freedom White division of the North Jersey Super Football Conference, which includes 112 schools competing in 20 divisions, making it the nation's biggest football-only high school sports league. The school was classified by the NJSIAA as Group IV North for football for 2024–2026, which included schools with 893 to 1,315 students.

The school teams are officially called the Millburn Millers. However, most teams simply call themselves Millburn.

The boys track team won the Group II spring / outdoor track state championship in 1957 and the Group III title in 1960.

The Millburn baseball program set a school record in 2008 with 27 wins, finishing 27–5 with conference and winning a North II, Group III state sectional title with a 9–8 win over John F. Kennedy Memorial High School of Iselin after trailing by 8–0 in the game's fourth inning before losing 17–8 to Northern Valley Regional High School at Old Tappan in the Group III semifinal. In 2015, the Millers won both the Group IV state championship and the New Jersey state title with an 11–3 win against Williamstown High School, the team's first, under coach Brian Chapman, who was later named one of the ABCA / Diamond Club National Coaches of the Year. Millburn held a 26–6 record during their state championship run, including a 14–2 record in league play. in 2017, the program won its second Group IV title with a 10–5 win against Hunterdon Central Regional High School in the playoff finals.

The boys' cross country team finished 4th in the State of New Jersey at the Meet of Champions in 2007 and 7th in 2009. Coach Jeffrey Kaye won Coach of the Year in 2004 and 2012.

In 1966, the football team was undefeated and was ranked first in the state. In 2002, the Millers finished the season 6-4 and had the team's first winning season since 1973 and the first six-game winning season since 1970. In 2006, the Millers finished the regular season 4-4 and qualified for the playoffs for the first time in school history since the playoff system was established in 1973. In the North II, Group III state sectional championship, the team came in as the 8th seed, falling to top-ranked Irvington High School 47–14 in the first round of the tournament.

The field hockey team won the North II, Group III state sectional title in 1979 and 1982. For the first time in 36 years, the 2018 Millburn varsity field hockey team won the North II, Group III state section title, before losing in the first round of the Group III Tournament in double overtime against Warren Hills Regional High School.

The boys' wrestling team won the North II Group II sectional championship in 1987. The former high school principal, William Miron, was a former top wrestler from the school, placing first in the wrestling state tournament at the weight class of 157 lbs in 1973.

The boys' tennis team won the Group III state championship in 1967 (vs. Summit High School), 1968 (vs. Metuchen High School), 1970 (vs. River Dell High School), 1971 (vs. Morris Hills High School), 1998 (vs. Middletown High School South), 2000 and 2001 (vs. Ocean Township High School both years), 2003 (vs. Princeton), 2005 (vs. Cumberland Regional High School), 2006 (vs. Ramapo High School), 2009 (vs. Ramapo), 2010 (vs. West Windsor-Plainsboro High School North), 2011 (vs. Moorestown), 2013 (vs. Hopewell Valley Central High School), 2015 (vs. Princeton High School) and 2017 (vs. Northern Highlands Regional High School), won the Group II title in 1988 (vs. Holmdel High School), 1989 and 1990 (vs. Moorestown High School both years), 1992 (vs. Princeton), 1993 (vs. Moorestown), 1994 (vs. Holmdel), 1995 (vs. Princeton), and won the Group IV title in 2013 (vs. Montgomery High School), 2014 (vs. Montclair High School). The team was the overall state champion in 1970 (vs. Westfield High School) and 1989 (vs. Christian Brothers Academy). The team won the Tournament of Champions in 1994 (vs. Cherry Hill East High School), 2006 (vs. Delbarton School), 2012 (vs. West Windsor-Plainsboro High School South), 2013 (vs. Holmdel), 2014 (vs. Haddonfield Memorial High School). The 25 state championships, seven Tournament of Champions titles and six consecutive state titles are the most of any public school in the state. The 1967 team won the Group III title, defeating semifinals opponent Northern Valley Regional High School at Demarest 2½-½ and beat Summit 3–0 in the finals. The boys' tennis team won the 2006 Group III state championship, defeating Moorestown High School 3½-1½ in the semifinals and Ramapo High School 5–0 in the finals to take the title. The 2007 team won the North II, Group III state sectional title with a 4–1 win vs. Ridge High School.

In 2008, sophomore Tyler Udland won the NJSIAA Meet of Champions 3,200 m race with a time of 9:04.80, the sixth-fastest ever run in the state by a sophomore. Udland became the school's fourth individual Meet of Champions winner, joining All-Americans Tom Lester (1966 in the discus), Steve O'Connell (1975 and 1976; Mile) and Will Nesbitt (1980; pole vault) as well as Marty O'Hare (1973, long jump).

The girls' tennis team won the Group III state champions in 1978 (vs. Ridge High School), 1979 (vs. Holy Spirit High School), 1980 (vs. Cherokee High School) and 1981 (vs. Ramapo High School), 1997 (vs. Ramapo), 1998 (vs. Watchung Hills Regional High School), 2006 and 2007 (vs. Moorestown both years), 2008 (vs. Ramapo), 2009 (vs. Holmdel High School), 2010 (vs. Ramapo), 2011 (vs. Montville Township High School), and 2014 (vs. Princeton High School), won the Group II state championship in 1986 (vs. Moorestown High School), 1988 (vs. Rumson-Fair Haven Regional High School), 1989 and 1990 (vs. Millburn both years), 1996 (vs. Manasquan High School), and won the Group IV title in 2012 and 2013 (vs. West Windsor-Plainsboro High School South both years). The team won the Tournament of Champions in 1988 (vs. St. John Vianney High School), 1989 (vs. Red Bank Catholic High School), 2006 (vs. East Brunswick High School), 2007 (vs. Tenafly High School), 2011 (vs. Red Bank Catholic), 2013 (vs. Haddonfield Memorial High School) and 2014 (vs. Holmdel). The 14 appearances in the Tournament of Champions is the most of any girls' tennis program, 20 state group titles are tied for the most of any school in the state, the seven Tournament of Champions titles is the second-most of any school and the nine consecutive state group titles from 2006 to 2014 is the state's second longest. In 2006, team won the Group III title at Mercer County Park after defeating Seneca High School 5–0 in the semifinals and Moorestown 3–2 in the finals. The 2007 girls' tennis team won the North II, Group III state sectional championship with a 5–0 win over Holmdel in the tournament final and moved on to take the Group III state championship with a 3½-1½ win over Wall Township in the semifinals and Moorestown in the finals by a 5–0 score. In 2016, The Millburn girls tennis team extended their winning streak to 99 games and won their fourth consecutive NJSIAA/New Balance Tournament of Champions title, an accomplishment that earned the team recognition as #13 of "NJ.com's 17 biggest high school sports stories of 2016".

The girls fencing team was the overall state champion in 1995 and was the foil team winner in 2009. The boys fencing team won the overall state championship in 1998 and 2000. The program has produced several international competitors, including Olympian Tamir Bloom. It has also produced many individual state champion fencers. Most recently, Alexander Mills won the New Jersey State Foil title for two consecutive years in 2007 and 2008 and his brother, Michael Mills claimed the state saber title in 2010. In the 08–09 season, the girls fencing team won the state foil title, as well as gold for Overall, led by Brianna Martin who had an individual record of 86-2 and won the New Jersey State Foil individual title.

The boys' soccer team won the Group II title in 1986 (as co-champion with Delran High School) and 1987 (as co-champion with Monroe Township High School), won the Group III title in 2008 (vs. Moorestown High School) and the Group IV championship in 2012 (vs. Monroe Township). The 1986 team finished the season with a record of 24-1-1 after being declared as co-champion with Delran following a 1–1 tie in the tournament final played at Trenton State College. The 2008 boys' varsity soccer team won the Group III state championship with a 3–0 win over Moorestown High School. It was the first soccer team in Millburn school history to win an outright Group III championship and the first since 1987 to win any state sectional championship. The team also captured the Essex County and Northern Hills Conference championships, finishing with a record of 23-2 and ranked 3rd in the state of New Jersey and 32nd in the nation. In 2012 the Millburn boys varsity soccer team won the 2012 NJSIAA Group IV state championship with a 3–2 win over Monroe Township High School, after moving up from Group III before the season.

The girls' soccer team won the Group III state title in 2010 after defeating Hopewell Valley Central High School in the tournament final.

In 2013, the boys' and girls' cross country teams won the Essex County championship as well as the Group IV state sectional championship. This was the third straight country title for the boys team and the first for girls. The sectional championship was the second in school history for the girls team, the first being in 1988.

== Extracurricular activities ==
The school's forensics team placed fifth in the National Debate Rankings during the 2005–06 school year. The school also has teams that compete in Lincoln-Douglas debate, Public Forum Debate, Congressional Debate, Extemporaneous Speaking and Speech (interpretation and oratory).

Millburn competes in state and national Academic Quiz Bowl competitions, netting sixth place in the 2006 National Academic Quiz Tournaments (NAQT) National High School Championship and second place in the 2019 National History Bowl Varsity National Championships.

Millburn has a literary magazine (Word), non-fiction literary magazine (Cellar Door) and newspaper (The Miller). An item included in Word was winner of a 2009 Gold Medal from the Columbia Scholastic Press Association.

Millburn's performing arts program, the Millburn Limelight Players, has annual musical and dramatic productions. Recent productions have included The Drowsy Chaperone, Young Frankenstein, Pal Joey, Into the Woods, Cheaper by the Dozen, Dirty Rotten Scoundrels, How to Succeed in Business Without Really Trying, Metamorphoses, Thoroughly Modern Millie and Woody Allen's Don't Drink the Water. Between 80 and 100 students each year are involved with the musical and dramatic productions, whether as onstage performers, backstage and technical crew, set builders or members of the pit orchestra. Notable Limelight alumni include Anne Hathaway.

Millburn's Robotics Club was started in 2014 to compete in FTC under team number 8405. They were the champions of the 2014-15 New Jersey FTC State Championship for a game called Cascade Effect and they advanced to the World Championship, but did not enter division eliminations. The first Millburn VEX team, 7405M, started in 2015. Millburn has since added 2 other teams: 7405N in 2016, and 7405P in 2018. In the 2016-17 VEX season, the 7405M team was both the New Jersey State Tournament Champion and the Skills Champion, qualifying them for the World Championship. There, they made it to division quarterfinals. In the 2018-19 VEX season, all teams entered eliminations matches in the State Championship and the P team qualified for the 2018-19 World Championship due to their strong skills score. At worlds they won their division eliminations and advanced to round robin, becoming the first New Jersey team to do so. They went on to win the grand finals, making them the 2018-19 Vex World Champions out of approximately 11,400 teams worldwide. In the 2019-20 VEX season, Millburn added 7405K as a fourth team. Three of their teams, 7405P, 7405M, and 7405N, would qualify for the 2019-20 World Championship but would not be able to compete due to the COVID-19 pandemic. The World Champion 7405P team name would be retired after the 2019–2020 season and replaced with 7405R. 7405R would go on to win 2 State Championships (2024, 2025), winning Excellence at the WPI signature event, and making Division Finals at worlds with a top 15 ranking (2025) lead by driver Yuvi. In 2022, the FTC team was restarted under the same number after taking a 2-year hiatus during 2019. The FTC organization at Millburn High School added another team for the 2023-2024 FIRST Tech Challenge season, team number 23650.

Other clubs and activities include The MHS Peer Leader Program, Soulfege (MHS' student-led a cappella group), Squash Club, Yearbook, Art Club, Science and Tech Club, Philosophy Club, Table Tennis Club, Asian Club, Astronomy Club, Stage Crew, Drama Club, Students Against Destructive Decisions (SADD), Jewish Cultural Club, March of Dimes Club, Gay Straight Alliance and the Future Physicians, Nurses Club, and Conlang Club. Studio 462, the school's completely student run broadcasting network and production studio, was created by a group of students in 2013 and has continued to produce live coverage of school and sporting events as well as hosting an online network for school journalism.

The Millburn music department has an array of co-curricular activities available for students in their classes, including Chamber Orchestra, Pit Orchestra, Chorale and Jazz Band.

== Administration ==
The school's principal is Robert B. Nixon Jr., who assumed the position in December 2025. His core administration team included two vice principals.

William Miron, who had been the school's principal for 18 years, retired at the end of the 2024–25 school year.

== Controversy ==
While Millburn High School has become nationally known for its academic rigor, the school has also made national news for other less positive reasons. In 2009, a hazing tradition became a national storyline and topic of debate. The school's senior female students had established a ritual known as the "Slut List," which was a list of incoming freshman female students that should be made fun of and bullied for their attractiveness. Each year on the first day of school, the senior students would print hundreds of copies of this list and release it all over the school so that all members of the school could see it. The New York Times broke the story in 2009 and it led to a slew of national media outlets coming to the school or talking to the school on their platforms, such as the morning talk show The View. The Slut List went unchecked by school faculty for years until it became a national headline.

Also in 2009, a racially-charged fight occurred in the parking lot of Millburn High School between an African American student, his father, and a white student. The father and son were accused of beating the other student with a baseball bat and were charged with aggravated assault and weapons possession. A grand jury declined to indict the father and son, while a family court dropped charges against the son. In 2019, the Millburn Board of Education and a former assistant principal reached a $435,000 settlement with the African American son, after the father claimed his son had been discriminated against by bullies.

In 2020, the school principal at the time, William Miron, published a public apology for a photograph that appeared in the 2020 yearbook. The photo was of a Millburn football player holding a blue flag expressing support for law enforcement officers and it was taken to honour Millburn's recreation teams and the D.A.R.E program. A Millburn parent responded to the apology by calling it "condescending" and "offensive".

== Notable alumni ==
- Emily Bauer (born 1981), actress who appeared in Mona Lisa Smile
- Tamir Bloom (born 1971), former Olympian épée fencer
- Ruben Bolling (pseudonym for Ken Fisher, born c. 1963, cartoonist and the author of Tom the Dancing Bug
- Courtney Brosnan (born 1995), professional soccer player who plays as a goalkeeper for West Ham United F.C. Women of the Women's Super League
- Fritz Buehning (born 1960), former professional tennis player, who won the New Jersey state individual tennis championship in 1977 as a junior, his final year in high school
- Andrew Catalon (born 1980, class of 1997), sportscaster who has announced NFL on CBS, PGA Tour on CBS, College Basketball on CBS and NCAA March Madness
- Eric Chivian (born 1942, class of 1960), co-founder, treasurer and member of the board of directors of International Physicians for the Prevention of Nuclear War, which won the Nobel Peace Prize in 1985
- Pablo Eisenberg (1932–2022, class of 1950), scholar, social justice advocate and tennis player
- Max Eisenbud (born 1972, class of 1990), sports agent specializing in tennis
- Barry Eisler (born 1964, class of 1982), novelist
- Mark Gerson (born 1972, class of 1990), investor, businessman and philanthropist
- Grace Hartigan (1922–2008, class of 1940), Abstract Expressionist painter and a significant member of the New York School of the 1950s and 1960s
- Anne Hathaway (born 1982), Academy Award winner, best supporting actress 2013, Les Miserables; also starred in The Princess Diaries, The Devil Wears Prada and Brokeback Mountain
- Ariel Horn (born c. 1979), novelist and teacher
- Dara Horn (born 1977), novelist and professor of literature
- Marty Horn (born 1963), former professional football player who was a quarterback for one season with the Philadelphia Eagles
- Elliott Kalan (born 1981, class of 1999), head writer for The Daily Show
- Jon Kilik (born 1956, class of 1974), film producer
- Aileen Lee (born 1970, class of 1988), venture capitalist who coined the term “unicorn” to refer to a startup with a $1 billion valuation
- Conor Leslie (born 1991, class of 2008), actress
- David Levithan (born 1972, class of 1990) young adult fiction author and editor
- John Logan (born 1961, class of 1979), Oscar, Tony, and Golden Globe winning screenwriter and playwright
- John C. McGinley (born 1959), best known for the NBC show, Scrubs
- Robert Mulcahy (1932–2022), former athletic director at Rutgers University
- Julie Parsonnet, infectious disease expert
- Sondra Perl, Professor Emerita of English at Lehman College and director of the Ph.D. in Composition and Rhetoric at the Graduate Center of the City University of New York
- Hugo Pfaltz (1931–2019), politician who served two terms in the New Jersey General Assembly
- Corey Rae, transgender rights activist, writer, actress and model
- Alex Rosenberg (born 1991), basketball player who played for Hapoel Afula B.C. of the Israeli National League
- Julian Simon (1932–1998, class of 1949), economist best known for his work on population, natural resources and immigration
- Patti Stanger (born 1961), reality television personality who appeared on the Bravo television series Millionaire Matchmaker
- Lisa Taddeo (born 1980, class of 1998), author and journalist known for her book Three Women
- George C. Wilson (1927–2014, class of 1945), journalist who served as chief defense correspondent for The Washington Post from 1966 to 1990
- Rachel Zoe (born 1971), celebrity fashion stylist
