= Ina Drew =

American financial executive

- Education: Johns Hopkins University (B.A.); Columbia University (M.A.)
- Spouse: Howard Drew
- Children: 2

Ina R. Drew is a former high-ranking executive on Wall Street. She was the chief investment officer for JPMorgan Chase before resigning after the company suffered a trading loss of $9 billion in April/May 2012. A report produced by the United States Senate Permanent Subcommittee on Investigations revealed that she did not understand the trading strategy, and could not explain it to the subcommittee. Furthermore, she lied to the subcommittee by stating she had not seen or received the "decision table" which outlined the various trading options for her in January 2012.

Drew grew up in Springfield Township, New Jersey.

== Career ==
She was one of very few high-ranking female executives on Wall Street. "Until the loss was disclosed late Thursday [May 10, 2012], Drew was considered by some market participants as one of the best managers of balance-sheet risks. She earned more than $15 million in each of the last two years." Her reported compensation for 2011 was $14 million. In 1993, she was profiled as one of "40 under 40" by Crain's New York Business. She was CIO of JP Morgan Chase & Co. since February 2005. "Prior to that she was Head of Global Treasury [at JPM]". She earned a master's degree in international economics from the School of International and Public Affairs at Columbia University.

Drew and her husband have been residents of the Short Hills neighborhood of Millburn, New Jersey. They have one daughter and one son. Ina Drew is now a trustee at Barnard College. In 2018, she and her husband donated $1 million to Barnard and Columbia to endow two scholarships.
