= Millburn Township Public Schools =

School district in Essex County, New Jersey, US

Address
- 434 Millburn Avenue Millburn, New Jersey, 07041; United States
- Coordinates: 40.722129°N 74.313801°W

District information
- Grades: PreK to 12
- Superintendent: Christine Burton
- Business administrator: Cheryl Schneider
- Schools: 8

Students and staff
- Enrollment: 4,697 (as of 2020–21)
- Faculty: 418.2 FTEs
- Student–teacher ratio: 11.2:1

Other information
- District Factor Group: J
- Website: www.millburn.org
Ind.	Per pupil	District spending	Rank (*)	K-12 average	%± vs. average
1A	Total Spending	$18,579	52	$18,891	−1.7%
1	Budgetary Cost	14,608	56	14,783	−1.2%
2	Classroom Instruction	8,868	59	8,763	1.2%
6	Support Services	2,465	66	2,392	3.1%
8	Administrative Cost	1,445	51	1,485	−2.7%
10	Operations & Maintenance	1,463	31	1,783	−17.9%
13	Extracurricular Activities	319	79	268	19.0%
16	Median Teacher Salary	82,868	101	64,043
Data from NJDoE 2014 Taxpayers' Guide to Education Spending. *Of K-12 districts with more than 3,500 students. Lowest spending=1; Highest=103

The Millburn Township Public Schools are a comprehensive community public school district that serves students in pre-kindergarten through twelfth grade from Millburn, in Essex County, in the U.S. state of New Jersey. The district includes five K-4 elementary schools, a district-wide fifth grade school, a middle school and a high school.

As of the 2020–21 school year, the district, comprising eight schools, had an enrollment of 4,697 students and 418.2 classroom teachers (on an FTE basis), for a student–teacher ratio of 11.2:1.

The district is classified by the New Jersey Department of Education as being in District Factor Group "J", the highest of eight groupings. District Factor Groups organize districts statewide to allow comparison by common socioeconomic characteristics of the local districts. From lowest socioeconomic status to highest, the categories are A, B, CD, DE, FG, GH, I and J.

== Awards and recognition ==
During the 2007–08 school year, Millburn School was recognized with the Blue Ribbon School Award of Excellence by the United States Department of Education, the highest award an American school can receive.

The district's high school was the 8th-ranked public high school in New Jersey out of 328 schools statewide in New Jersey Monthly magazine's September 2012 cover story on the state's "Top Public High Schools", after being ranked 1st in 2010 out of 322 schools listed.

The district was selected as one of the top "100 Best Communities for Music Education in America 2006" by the American Music Conference.

== Schools ==
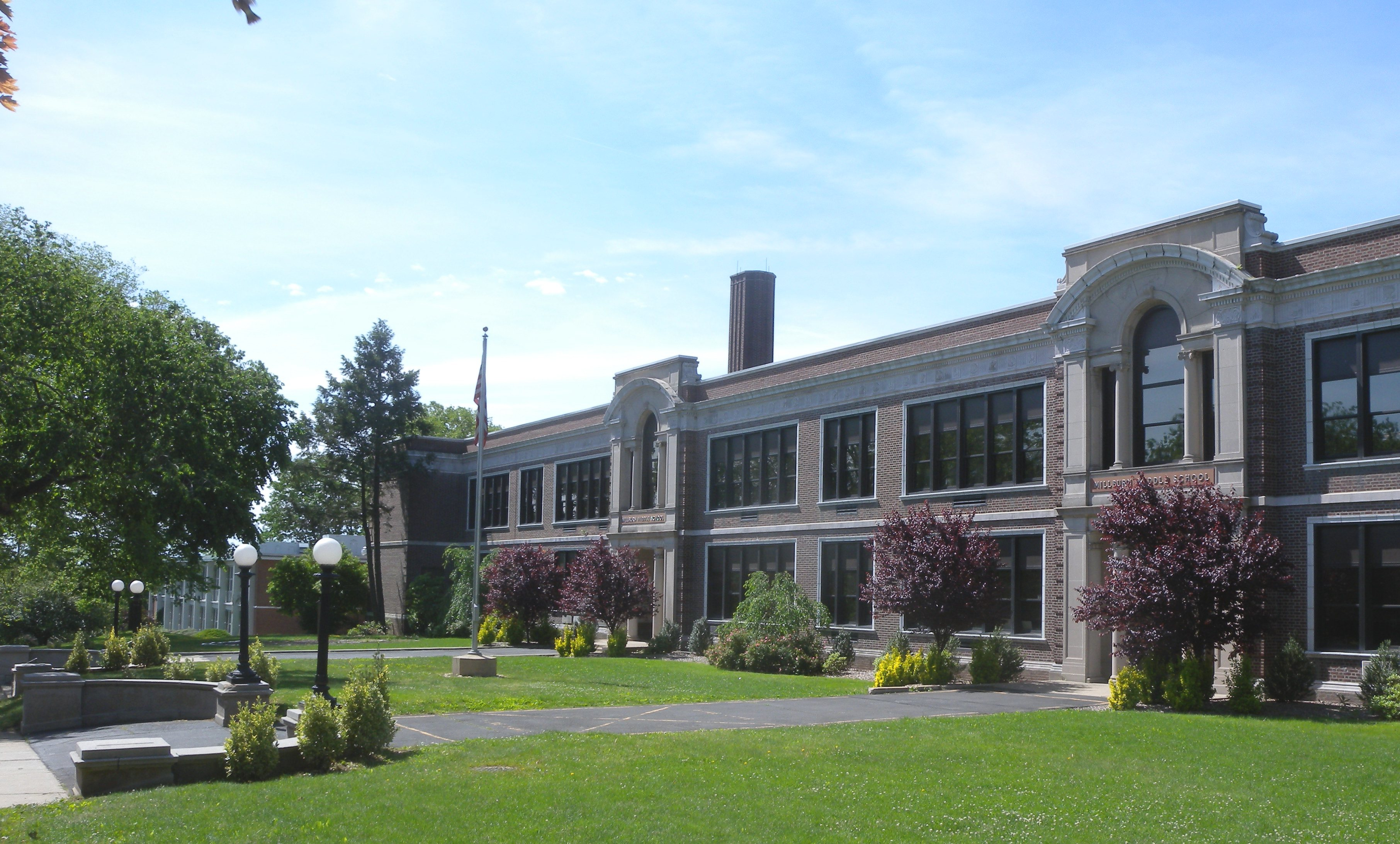
Millburn Middle School

Schools in the district (with 2020–21 enrollment data from the National Center for Education Statistics) are:

Elementary schools

- Deerfield Elementary School with 400 students in grades PreK-4
  - Kelly Salazar, principal
- Glenwood Elementary School with 357 students in grades K-4
  - David Jasin, principal
- Hartshorn Elementary School with 393 students in grades K-4
  - Ken Frattini, principal
- South Mountain Elementary School with 274 students in grades PreK-4
  - Scott Wolfe, principal
- Wyoming Elementary School with 310 students in grades K-4
  - Kristin Mueller, principal
- Washington School with 398 students in grade 5
  - Peter Mercurio, principal

Middle school

- Millburn Middle School with 1,197 students in grades 6–8
  - John Connolly, principal

High school

- Millburn High School with 1,319 students in grades 9–12
  - William Miron, principal

== Administration ==
Core members of the district's administration are:

- Christine Burton, superintendent
- Cheryl Schneider, business administrator and board secretary

== Board of education ==
The district's board of education is comprised of nine members who set policy and oversee the fiscal and educational operation of the district through its administration. As a Type II school district, the board's trustees are elected directly by voters to serve three-year terms of office on a staggered basis, with two or three seats up for election each year held (since 2012) as part of the November general election. The board appoints a superintendent to oversee the district's day-to-day operations and a business administrator to supervise the business functions of the district.
