= Max Eisenbud =

American sports agent (born 1972)

- Born: April 1972 (age 54)
- Education: Purdue University
- Occupation: Sports agent
- Years active: 1999–present

Max Eisenbud (born April 1972) is an American sports agent specializing in tennis. He is the vice president of tennis at IMG, a sports and entertainment management company. His clients include Madison Keys, Maria Sharapova, Li Na, Emma Raducanu, and Iga Świątek.

== Early life and education ==
Eisenbud grew up in Short Hills, New Jersey, and played competitive tennis in his youth. He won three consecutive Group 2 state championships at Millburn High School from 1988 to 1990. He played college tennis on a scholarship at Purdue University. He got his start in talent management in college as the social chairman of the Pi Kappa Alpha fraternity, putting on parties and concerts.

== Career ==
Eisenbud worked for an entertainment company in Connecticut after graduation. He helped put together a tennis charity event at the request of childhood friend Justin Gimelstob, an IMG client, which inspired him to want to become an agent for IMG. IMG hired him in 1999 to work at the Nick Bollettieri Tennis Academy in Bradenton, Florida, where he dealt with day-to-day issues like securing racket sponsorships and satisfying parents of junior tennis players. His first signing was Romanian tennis player Horia Tecău.

Eisenbud met 11- or 12-year-old Russian player Maria Sharapova on his first day at the academy and began helping the family with visas and other issues, becoming her exclusive agent soon thereafter. Sharapova has called Eisenbud "half family, half agent". He held out on committing to small sponsorship deals as Sharapova progressed on the ITF Junior Circuit, receiving more lucrative offers after she broke through to win the first of her five major titles at the 2004 Wimbledon Championships at age 17. He took advice from Mark Steinberg, Tiger Woods's agent, to mark a calendar with the few days a year that would not interfere with tournaments when Sharapova could be available for photoshoots and other brand commitments. Motorola, Canon, TAG Heuer, Colgate, Land Rover, Nike, and other contracts made her the world's highest-paid female athlete for 11 consecutive years from 2005 to 2015. Eisenbud was the chief executive officer of Sugarpova, a candy company founded by Sharapova in 2012. He claimed responsibility for Sharapova's doping violation in 2016, saying he had overlooked WADA's update that banned meldonium because he had cancelled the annual vacation when he said he usually checked updates to the banned substances list.

Eisenbud signed Chinese player Li Na in 2009. Over offers from Chinese brands, he negotiated an apparel deal for her with Nike that allowed her to wear sponsor patches, something not approved by Nike for any other tennis player. He signed various large deals for Li after she became the first Asian player to win a major title at the 2011 French Open. After winning the 2014 Australian Open, Li said in her victory speech: "Max. Agent. Make me rich. Thanks a lot".

As of 2015, Eisenbud's other clients on the WTA Tour included Madison Keys, Laura Robson, and Ajla Tomljanović. He has represented British player Emma Raducanu at least since the 2021 Wimbledon Championships where she reached the fourth round. He began representing world No. 1 Iga Świątek after her 2022 season.

== Personal life ==
Eisenbud lives in Miami, Florida. He was remarried in 2018 to his Wife Fara Eisenbud, together they have 4 children.
