= Lee Bickmore =

American businessman

- Born: Lee Smith Bickmore; 1908; Paradise, Utah, U.S.
- Died: 1986 (aged 78); Vero Beach, Florida, U.S.
- Education: Utah State University (BS)
- Known for: CEO of Nabisco
- Children: 2

Lee Smith Bickmore (1908 – 1986) was an American businessman who was the CEO of Nabisco. Bickmore was also an active figure in the Church of Jesus Christ of Latter-day Saints in New York and New Jersey.

== Early life and education ==
Bickmore was born in Paradise, Utah. He graduated from Utah State University and completed the advanced management program at Harvard Business School.

== Career ==
Bickmore began his employment with Nabisco as a salesman in Pocatello, Idaho. For many years, while serving as an executive, he lived in Short Hills, New Jersey. He was living in Vero Beach, Florida at the time of his death.

Bickmore was CEO of Nabisco when Nabisco introduced the Chips Ahoy cookie.

Bickmore was a member of the Church of Jesus Christ of Latter-day Saints. After being president of Nabisco, he served for a time as special consultant to the First Presidency for business operations, finances, buildings, communication and other related matters. Prior to this point, Bickmore had held several positions in the LDS Church in New York and New Jersey in the Sunday School and Young Men, and served as a member of the New York New York Stake high council. Bickmore was a trustee of Brandeis University and Pace University.

In the 1960s Bickmore served as an associate to Brigham Young University's fundraising campaign.

== Personal life ==
Bickmore and his wife, Ellen McMinn Bickmore, had two daughters. Bickmore died in Vero Beach, Florida in 1986. He was previously a resident of Short Hills, New Jersey.
