= List of awards and nominations received by Shailene Woodley =

Shailene Woodley awards and nominations
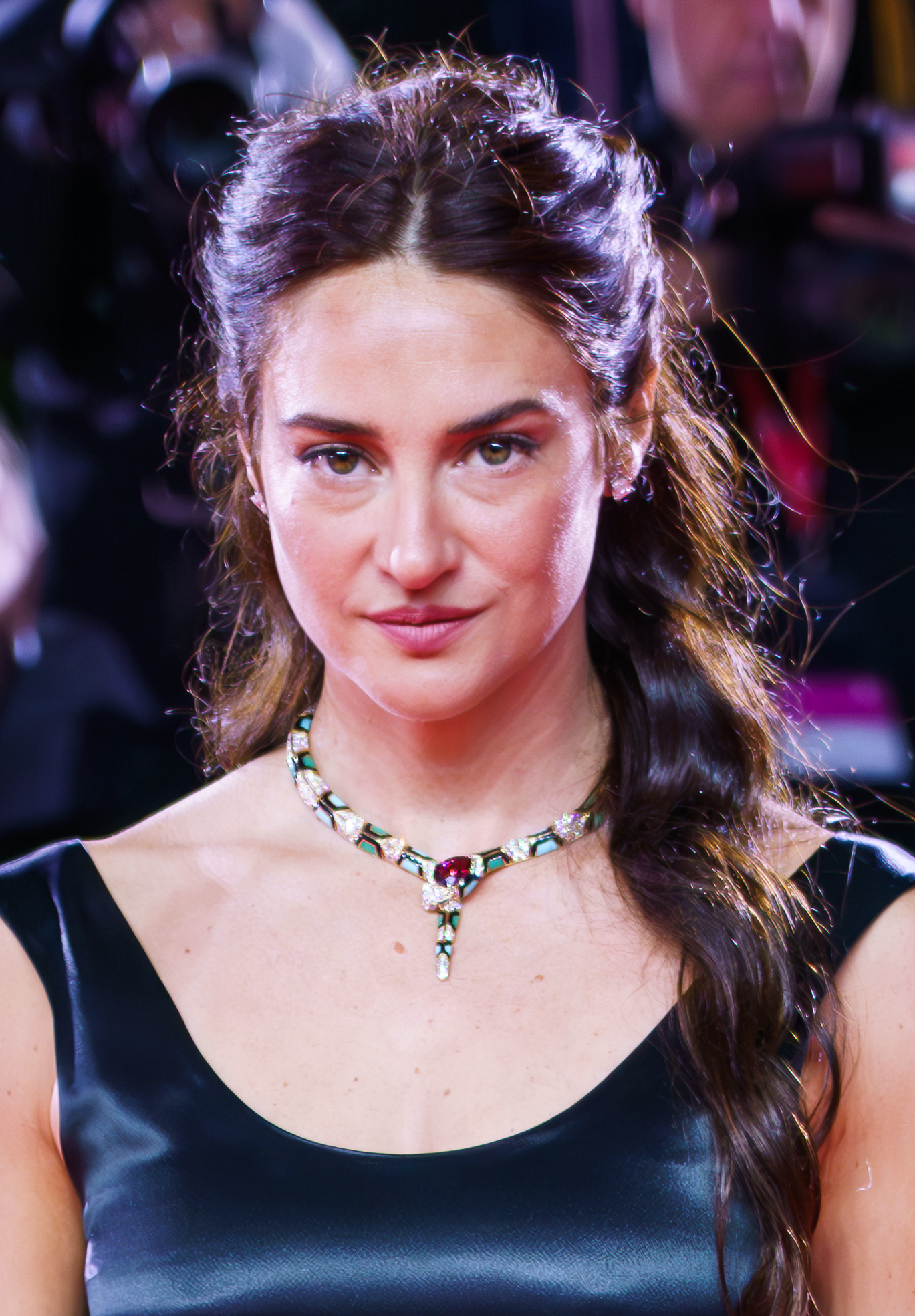
- Woodley at the 2025 Venice Film Festival
Awards and nominations
Award	Wins	Nominations
BAFTA Awards	0	1
Critics' Choice Awards	0	4
Golden Globes	0	2
Emmy Awards	1	2
SAG Awards	0	2

Totals (Note: Certain award groups do not simply award one winner. They acknowledge several different recipients, have runners-up, and have third place. Since this is a specific recognition and is different from losing an award, runner-up mentions are considered wins in this award tally. For simplification and to avoid errors, each award in this list has been presumed to have had a prior nomination.)
- Wins: 36
- Nominations: 72

Shailene Woodley is an American actress known for her roles on film, television, and stage. She has received numerous awards and nominations for her acting. She has won a Cannes Film Festival Prize and an Independent Spirit Award as well as nominations for a BAFTA Award, four Critics' Choice Movie Awards, two Golden Globe Awards, two Primetime Emmy Award, and two Screen Actors Guild Awards.

That same year she earned acclaim for her role as a troubled teenager in Alexander Payne's family dramedy The Descendants (2011). For her performance, she won the Independent Spirit Award for Best Supporting Female and was nominated for the Critics' Choice Movie Award for Best Supporting Actress, the Golden Globe Award for Best Supporting Actress – Motion Picture, the Screen Actors Guild Award for Outstanding Performance by a Cast in a Motion Picture. The following year she won the Cannes Film Festival Trophée Chopard in 2012. She was nominated for the BAFTA Rising Star Award at the 68th British Academy Film Awards. She starred as a romantic lead in the romance drama The Spectacular Now (2013) earning an Independent Spirit Award for Best Female Lead nomination. For her leading role as Beatrice "Tris" Prior in the dystopian-action adventure film Divergent (2014), she was nominated for the Critics' Choice Movie Award for Best Actress in an Action Movie.

On television, she played a mother and survivor of sexual assault in the HBO drama series Big Little Lies (2017–2019) for which she was nominated for the Golden Globe Award for Best Supporting Actress – Series, Miniseries or Television Film, the Primetime Emmy Award for Outstanding Supporting Actress in a Limited or Anthology Series or Movie, and the Screen Actors Guild Award for Outstanding Performance by an Ensemble in a Drama Series. On stage, she made her Broadway debut playing a pregnant religious fundamentalist in the family dramedy play Cult of Love (2024–2025) for which she was honored with the Theater World Award's Dorothy Loudon Award for Excellence in The Theater.

== Major associations ==
Year	Category	Nominated work	Result	Ref.
British Academy Film Awards
2014	BAFTA Rising Star Award		Nominated	
Critics' Choice Movie Awards
2011	Best Supporting Actress	The Descendants	Nominated	
2011	Best Young Performer	The Descendants	Nominated	
2011	Best Acting Ensemble	The Descendants	Nominated	
2014	Best Actress in an Action Movie	Divergent	Nominated	
Primetime Emmy Awards
2017	Outstanding Supporting Actress in a Limited Series or Movie	Big Little Lies (season one)	Nominated	
2026	Outstanding Guest Actress in a Drama Series	Paradise (Episode: "Graceland")	Won	
Golden Globe Awards
2011	Best Supporting Actress — Motion Picture	The Descendants	Nominated	
2017	Best Supporting Actress — Series, Miniseries or TV Movie	Big Little Lies (season one)	Nominated	
Screen Actors Guild Awards
2011	Outstanding Cast in a Motion Picture	The Descendants	Nominated	
2019	Outstanding Ensemble in a Drama Series	Big Little Lies (season two)	Nominated	

== Miscellaneous awards ==
Organizations	Year	Category	Work	Result	Ref.
Cannes Film Festival	2012	Trophée Chopard	The Descendants	Won	
Deauville American Film Festival	2018	Rising Star Award		Won	
Gracie Allen Awards	2018	Actress in a Supporting Role - Made for TV Movie or Limited Series	Big Little Lies	Won	
Gotham Awards	2011	Breakthrough Actress	The Descendants	Nominated	
Gotham Awards	2011	Best Ensemble Performance	The Descendants	Nominated	
Gotham Awards	2013	Best Actress	The Spectacular Now	Nominated	
Hollywood Film Awards	2014	Breakout Performance Actress	The Fault in Our Stars	Won	
Independent Spirit Awards	2011	Best Supporting Female	The Descendants	Won	
Independent Spirit Awards	2013	Best Female Lead	The Spectacular Now	Nominated	
MTV Movie Awards	2012	Breakthrough Performance	The Descendants	Won	
MTV Movie Awards	2014	Best Kiss (shared with Miles Teller)	The Spectacular Now	Nominated	
MTV Movie Awards	2014	Favorite Character	Divergent	Won	
MTV Movie Awards	2015	Best Female Performance	The Fault in Our Stars	Won	
MTV Movie Awards	2015	Best On-Screen Duo (shared with Ansel Elgort)	The Fault in Our Stars	Nominated	
MTV Movie Awards	2015	Best Kiss	The Fault in Our Stars	Won	
MTV Movie Awards	2015	Best Hero	The Divergent Series: Insurgent	Nominated	
MTV Movie Awards	2015	MTV Trailblazer Award	Herself	Won	
MTV Video Music Awards	2017	Best Fight Against the System	Stand Up / Stand N Rock #NoDAPL (w/ Taboo)	Won	
National Board of Review	2011	Best Supporting Actress	The Descendants	Won	
People's Choice Awards	2015	Favorite Action Movie Actress	Divergent	Nominated	
People's Choice Awards	2015	Favorite Movie Duo (shared with Theo James)	Divergent	Won	
People's Choice Awards	2015	Favorite Dramatic Movie Actress	The Fault in Our Stars	Nominated	
People's Choice Awards	2015	Favorite Movie Duo (shared with Ansel Elgort)	The Fault in Our Stars	Nominated	
People's Choice Awards	2016	Favorite Action Movie Actress	The Divergent Series: Insurgent	Won	
People's Choice Awards	2017	Favorite Action Movie Actress	The Divergent Series: Allegiant	Nominated	
People's Choice Awards	2018	The Drama Movie Star of 2018	Adrift	Nominated	
Santa Barbara International Film Festival	2012	Virtuosos Award	The Descendants	Won	
SCAD Savannah Film Festival	2018	Spotlight Award		Won	
Sundance Film Festival	2013	U.S. Dramatic Special Jury Award for Acting	The Spectacular Now (with Miles Teller)	Won	
Teen Choice Awards	2009	Choice TV Actress: Drama	The Secret Life of the American Teenager	Nominated	
Teen Choice Awards	2010	Choice TV Actress: Drama	The Secret Life of the American Teenager	Nominated	
Teen Choice Awards	2010	Choice Summer TV Star: Female	The Secret Life of the American Teenager	Nominated	
Teen Choice Awards	2011	Choice TV Actress: Drama	The Secret Life of the American Teenager	Nominated	
Teen Choice Awards	2012	Choice Summer TV Star: Female	The Secret Life of the American Teenager	Nominated	
Teen Choice Awards	2014	Choice Movie Actress: Action	Divergent	Won	
Teen Choice Awards	2014	Choice Movie Actress: Drama	The Fault in Our Stars	Won	
Teen Choice Awards	2014	Choice Movie: Chemistry (shared with Ansel Elgort and Nat Wolff)	The Fault in Our Stars	Won	
Teen Choice Awards	2014	Choice Movie: Liplock (shared with Ansel Elgort)	The Fault in Our Stars	Won	
Teen Choice Awards	2015	Choice Movie Actress: Action	The Divergent Series: Insurgent	Won	
Teen Choice Awards	2015	Choice Movie: Liplock (shared with Theo James)	The Divergent Series: Insurgent	Won	
Teen Choice Awards	2016	Choice Movie Actress: Action	The Divergent Series: Allegiant	Won	
Teen Choice Awards	2016	Choice Movie: Chemistry (shared with Theo James)	The Divergent Series: Allegiant	Nominated	
Teen Choice Awards	2016	Choice Movie: Liplock (shared with Theo James)	The Divergent Series: Allegiant	Nominated	
Teen Choice Awards	2018	Choice Summer Movie Actress	Adrift	Nominated	
Theater World Award	2025	Dorothy Loudon Award for Excellence in The Theater	Cult of Love	Honored	
Young Artist Awards	2005	Best Leading Young Actress in a TV Movie, Miniseries or Special	A Place Called Home	Nominated	
Young Artist Awards	2006	Best Leading Young Actress in a TV Movie, Miniseries or Special	Felicity: An American Girl Adventure	Nominated	
Young Artist Awards	2009	Best Leading Young Actress in a TV Series (Comedy or Drama)	The Secret Life of the American Teenager	Nominated	
Young Hollywood Awards	2014	Fan Favorite Actor–Female	—N/a	Nominated	
Young Hollywood Awards	2014	Best On-Screen Couple	Divergent (with Theo James)	Nominated	
Young Hollywood Awards	2014	Best On-Screen Couple	The Fault in Our Stars (with Ansel Elgort)	Won	

== Film critic associations ==
Year	Association	Category	Nominated work	Result	Ref.
2011	Washington D.C. Area Film Critics Association	Best Supporting Actress	The Descendants	Nominated	
2011	Houston Film Critics Society	Best Supporting Actress	The Descendants	Won	
2011	San Diego Film Critics Society	Best Supporting Actress	The Descendants	Won	
2011	Detroit Film Critics Society	Breakthrough Performance	The Descendants	Nominated	
2011	Toronto Film Critics Association	Best Supporting Actress	The Descendants	Nominated	
2011	Dallas–Fort Worth Film Critics Association	Best Supporting Actress	The Descendants	Won	
2011	Chicago Film Critics Association	Best Supporting Actress	The Descendants	Nominated	
2011	Chicago Film Critics Association	Most Promising Performer	The Descendants	Nominated	
2011	St. Louis Gateway Film Critics Association	Best Supporting Actress	The Descendants	Nominated	
2011	Florida Film Critics Circle	Best Supporting Actress	The Descendants	Won	
2012	Online Film Critics Society	Best Supporting Actress	The Descendants	Nominated	
2012	National Society of Film Critics	Best Supporting Actress	The Descendants	Nominated	
2012	Vancouver Film Critics Circle	Best Supporting Actress	The Descendants	Nominated	
2012	Denver Film Critics Society	Best Supporting Actress	The Descendants	Won	
2012	Denver Film Critics Society	Best Breakout Star	The Descendants	Nominated	
2013	San Diego Film Critics Society	Best Supporting Actress	The Spectacular Now	Won	
