= Skint =

Skint may refer to:

- Skint Records, an English electronic music record label based in Brighton
- Skint (2005 TV series), a BBC television series
- Skint (2013 TV series), a Channel 4 television series
- "Skint" (Drifters), a 2015 television episode

== See also ==
- Skint & Demoralised, a British pop act
