= Three Women (TV series) =

2024 American drama miniseries

- Based on: Three Women by Lisa Taddeo
- Starring: Shailene Woodley; DeWanda Wise; Betty Gilpin; Gabrielle Creevy; Blair Underwood; John Patrick Amedori
- Country of origin: United States
- Original language: English
- No. of seasons: 1
- No. of episodes: 10

Production
- Executive producers: Lisa Taddeo; Laura Eason; Kathy Ciric; Emmy Rossum; Louise Friedberg
- Production companies: All Dogs Inn; Upside

Original release
- Network: Starz
- Release: September 13 – November 15, 2024

Three Women is an American television limited series based on the 2019 book of the same name by Lisa Taddeo. The series was initially set to premiere on Showtime, but on January 30, 2023, Deadline reported that Showtime had decided not to air the completed series. Starz picked up the series a week later. All 10 episodes of season one premiered on February 16, 2024, in Australia on Stan. In May 2024, Starz announced that the show would premiere on September 13, 2024, with a weekly release. The series has been picked up by Channel 4 in the UK, and is due to air on October 4, 2026.

== Premise ==
A writer, working on a book about sex in America, is initially told she needs to look at married men to capture the subject matter. However, she wants to look at women in middle America. She convinces three women, all of whom are on a course to radically change their lives, to tell her their stories.

Lina is a woman living in deeply religious middle America in a marriage where her husband refuses to kiss her or be intimate with her anymore. Sloane is a successful woman in a loving but open marriage. Maggie is a young woman who had a relationship with her married high school English teacher, and is still traumatized by it.

== Cast and characters ==
=== Main ===
- Shailene Woodley as Gia Lombardi
- DeWanda Wise as Sloane Ford
- Betty Gilpin as Lina Parish
- Gabrielle Creevy as Maggie Wilkin
- Blair Underwood as Richard Ford
- John Patrick Amedori as Jack

=== Recurring ===
- Ravi Patel as Dr. Henry
- Austin Stowell as Aidan
- Lola Kirke as Lily
- Jason Ralph as Aaron Knodel
- Blair Redford as Will
- Fred Savage as Rody
- Jess Gabor as Billie
- Brían F. O'Byrne as Mark Wilkin
- Heather Goldenhersh as Arlene Wilkin
- Zane Pais as David Wilkin
- Tony D. Head as Stephen

== Episodes ==
No.	Title	Directed by	Written by	Australia release date	U.S. air date
1	"Three Women"	Louise N. D. Friedberg	Lisa Taddeo	February 16, 2024	September 13, 2024
2	"Lina"	Louise N. D. Friedberg	Lisa Taddeo	February 16, 2024	September 20, 2024
3	"Sloane"	Ekwa Msangi	Tori Sampson	February 16, 2024	September 27, 2024
4	"Maggie"	Cate Shortland	Laura Eason	February 16, 2024	October 4, 2024
5	"Gia"	Louise N. D. Friedberg	Lisa Taddeo & Jackson Waite	February 16, 2024	October 11, 2024
6	"Climax"	So Yong Kim	Laura Eason	February 16, 2024	October 18, 2024
7	"Two Women"	Lisa Brühlmann	Laura Eason & Lisa Taddeo	February 16, 2024	October 25, 2024
8	"Twilight"	Cate Shortland	Laura Eason	February 16, 2024	November 1, 2024
9	"Sex on Drugs"	Nathalie Álvarez Mesén	Chisa Hutchinson & Tori Sampson	February 16, 2024	November 8, 2024
10	"Her Name"	So Yong Kim	Lisa Taddeo	February 16, 2024	November 15, 2024

== Production ==
=== Development ===
In July 2019, Showtime acquired rights to Three Women by Lisa Taddeo, with Taddeo attached to write and executive produce. On January 30, 2023, Deadline reported that Showtime had decided not to air the completed series, amid a reorganization at parent company Paramount Global and a review of Showtime's programming slate, but was being shopped to other services. The series was later picked up by Starz in early February 2023. The series premiered on September 13, 2024.

=== Casting ===
In July 2021, Shailene Woodley and DeWanda Wise joined the cast of the series. In September 2021, Betty Gilpin joined the cast in a series regular capacity, with Ravi Patel joining in recurring capacity. In October 2021, Blair Underwood and Gabrielle Creevy joined the cast in series regular capacity, with Austin Stowell and Lola Kirke joining in recurring capacity. In November 2021, Jason Ralph, Blair Redford and Jess Gabor joined in recurring roles. In December 2021, John Patrick Amedori joined the cast in a series regular capacity. In February 2022, Brían F. O'Byrne and Heather Goldenhersh joined the cast in recurring capacity.

=== Filming ===
Principal photography began by October 2021, taking place in Long Island, New York. In November 2021, scenes were shot in Schenectady, New York.

== Reception ==
On the review aggregator website Rotten Tomatoes, 31% of 16 critics' reviews are positive, with an average rating of 6.2/10. The website's critics consensus reads, "Betty Gilpin shines in this otherwise disappointingly didactic series, where the diverging story strands never cohere into a satisfying whole." Metacritic, which uses a weighted average, assigned a score of 52 out of 100, based on 11 critics, indicating "mixed or average" reviews. Kylie Northover from The Sydney Morning Herald wrote: "This was never going to be an easy book to adapt, and [the show] feels bloated at 10 episodes, but Maggie and Lina’s stories are compelling; Sloane and her husband (Blair Underwood) are the least relatable, a lot larger than life than they were portrayed in the book."

=== Accolades ===
Year	Award	Category	Recipient(s)	Result	Ref.
2025	Critics' Choice Television Awards	Best Supporting Actress in a Limited Series or Movie Made for Television	Betty Gilpin	Nominated	
2025	Independent Spirit Awards	Best Supporting Performance in a New Scripted Series	Betty Gilpin	Nominated	
