= Shailene Woodley =

American actress (born 1991)

- Woodley at the 2025 Venice Film Festival
- Born: Shailene Diann Woodley; November 15, 1991 (age 35); San Bernardino, California, U.S.
- Occupation: Actress
- Years active: 1999–present
- Awards: Full list

Shailene Diann Woodley (born November 15, 1991) is an American actress. Known for her work on screen and stage, her accolades include a Primetime Emmy Award and a Trophée Chopard, in addition to nominations for two Actor Awards, a British Academy Film Award, and two Golden Globes.

Woodley gained acclaim for playing a rebellious daughter in the Alexander Payne dramedy The Descendants (2011), which earned her a Golden Globe Award nomination. She achieved wider recognition for her roles in the teen dramas The Spectacular Now (2013) and The Fault in Our Stars (2014) and for her portrayal of Beatrice Prior in the science-fiction trilogy The Divergent Series (2014–2016). She has since acted in the films Snowden (2016), Adrift (2018), The Mauritanian (2021), Ferrari (2023), and To Catch a Killer (2023), the latter of which she also produced.

On television, she had her breakthrough playing Amy Juergens in the ABC Family teen drama series The Secret Life of the American Teenager (2008–2013). She played a former med student and survivor in the Hulu apocalyptic thriller series Paradise (2026) earning the Primetime Emmy Award. She was previously Emmy-nominated for her role as a sexual assault survivor in the HBO drama series Big Little Lies (2017–2019).

Woodley made her Broadway debut in Leslye Headland's family dramedy play Cult of Love (2024), for which she was honored with a Theater World Award. She is also an environmental activist and a Greenpeace Oceans Ambassador, and serves on a number of boards dedicated to environmental causes. She is co-founder of the nonprofit organization All it Takes, which focuses on youth development.

== Early life ==
Woodley was born in San Bernardino, California. Her mother, Lori, is a middle-school counselor and her father, Lonnie, is a former school principal and a family therapist. Shailene has a younger brother, Tanner. Her parents separated when she was 14. Woodley has a diverse ethnic background, with British ancestry on her father's side and a maternal heritage that includes African-American and Creole roots, as well as French, Spanish, Swiss, and German ancestry.

Woodley was discovered by an agent while she was taking a local theater class, which was part of a $700 program she begged her parents to enroll her in after accompanying her cousin to a theater class in her hometown. At the age of five, she began working in commercials, including advertisements for Leapfrog, Hertz, and a Honda minivan, appearing in more than sixty TV spots before she turned eleven years old. She told The Hollywood Reporter that her parents only agreed to allow her to work professionally if she promised to adhere to three rules: "I had to stay the person they knew I was; have fun; and do good in school". Despite an ADHD diagnosis, Woodley was a 4.0 student, who took AP classes and graduated from Simi Valley High School.

She considered studying interior design at New York University (NYU) but her acting career became more demanding as she signed on to star in The Secret Life of the American Teenager. During a hiatus from her TV show, Woodley took a job at American Apparel in New York City. Two days into the new job, she got a call to meet with director Alexander Payne and after two months, she had to quit the job after joining the film The Descendants. She also took acting classes from Anthony Meindl.

At fifteen, she was diagnosed with scoliosis and was put in a chest-to-hips plastic brace for two years. Woodley told Us Weekly that "It's like wearing a tacky, disgusting, plastic corset for 18 hours a day. In the beginning, it was hard to eat or breathe. And I had to give up cross-country running. But I needed to have it to realign my spine". Her condition did not affect her work on set as she "would [just] take the brace off during filming and put it back on during breaks".

== Career ==
=== 1999–2010: Acting beginnings ===
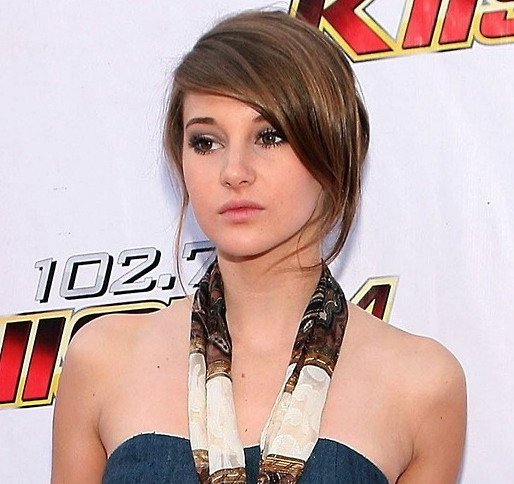
Woodley at KIIS-FM's Wango Tango in Los Angeles, September 2009

Woodley began her acting career in 1999 with a minor role in the television film Replacing Dad. She went on to feature in minor television roles in The District and Crossing Jordan (in the latter, she portrayed the 10-year-old version of Jill Hennessy's title character). Next she had a leading role in the television film A Place Called Home (2004) as California Ford, which earned her a nomination for a Young Artist Award for Best Leading Young Actress in a TV Movie, Miniseries or Special. She also originally played the young Kaitlin Cooper in The O.C. She appeared as the titular character Felicity Merriman in the television film Felicity: An American Girl Adventure (2005). Her performance received another Young Artist Award nomination, this time for Best Performance in a TV Movie, Miniseries, or Special (Comedy or Drama). Following this, Woodley appeared in numerous guest roles in other television series, including Everybody Loves Raymond, My Name Is Earl, CSI: NY, Close to Home, and Cold Case.

Woodley was cast as the main character, Amy Juergens, in the ABC Family series The Secret Life of the American Teenager (2008–2013), about a 15-year-old girl who learns she is pregnant. The show explores the effects of her pregnancy on her family, friends and herself, as well as life at Grant High School. Ken Tucker of Entertainment Weekly praised her performance, stating, "[It] lifts a well-meaning, rather brave, but ramshackle show a notch." Popular among viewers, the show became one of ABC Family's most-watched telecasts throughout its five-season run, spanning over 121 episodes.

=== 2011–2014: Film debut and breakthrough ===
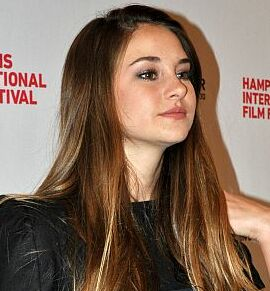
Woodley at the 19th Annual Hamptons International Film Festival at Sagaponack, New York in October 2011

In 2011, Woodley made her feature film debut in Alexander Payne's The Descendants, where she played Alex, the troubled elder daughter of Matt King (played by George Clooney). Her performance received positive reviews from critics. A. O. Scott from The New York Times said, "Ms. Woodley [gives] one of the toughest, smartest, most credible adolescent performances in recent memory." Peter Debruge from Variety said that her performance is a "revelation" and that "in the role of Alex, [she is] displaying both the edge and depth the role demands." Following accolades for her performance, Woodley received a Golden Globe nomination for Best Supporting Actress – Motion Picture, and won the Independent Spirit Award for Best Supporting Female. Consequently, she was awarded the Trophée Chopard at the 2012 Cannes Film Festival and the 2012 Santa Barbara International Film Festival Virtuoso Award. People named her one of 2012's "Most Beautiful at Every Age." Woodley was also considered one of the 55 faces of the future by Nylon's "Young Hollywood Issue". She also received the Emerging Star Spotlight Award at Elle's 20th Annual "Women In Hollywood".

Woodley starred in the film adaptation of Tim Tharp's novel, The Spectacular Now, as Aimee Finecky, an innocent, bookish teenager who begins dating the charming, freewheeling high-school senior Sutter Keely (Miles Teller). The film premiered at Sundance on January 18, 2013. Her portrayal of Aimee garnered much praise; Los Angeles Times' critic Betsy Sharkey said that Woodley and Teller "bring such an authentic face of confidence and questioning, indifference and need, pain and denial, friendship and first love", while another critic from The Guardian said that they gave "remarkably strong performances" that "display a depth of feeling that's breathtaking in its simplicity and honest[y]." Additionally, Woodley won the Special Jury Award for Acting, alongside Teller, at the 2013 Sundance Film Festival and received a nomination for the Independent Spirit Award for Best Female Lead.

In October 2012, Woodley was offered the role of Mary Jane Watson in The Amazing Spider-Man 2. On June 19, 2013, she was cut from the film. Director Marc Webb told The Hollywood Reporter that the cut was "a creative decision to streamline the story and focus on Peter and Gwen and their relationship," and that everyone loved working with Woodley. She had also signed on to star in White Bird in a Blizzard, directed by Gregg Araki. Although filming took place in October 2012, the film was not released until January 20, 2014, at the Sundance Film Festival and then on October 24, 2014, to wider audiences, where it received mixed reviews. In the film, she plays teenager Katrina "Kat" Connors, whose life is thrown into chaos when her mother disappears. Critic Moira MacDonald commended her by saying, "Woodley's depiction of Kat is low-key, natural, and utterly unaffected; as she has in every role, she makes the character her own, with her scratchy little voice and level gaze."

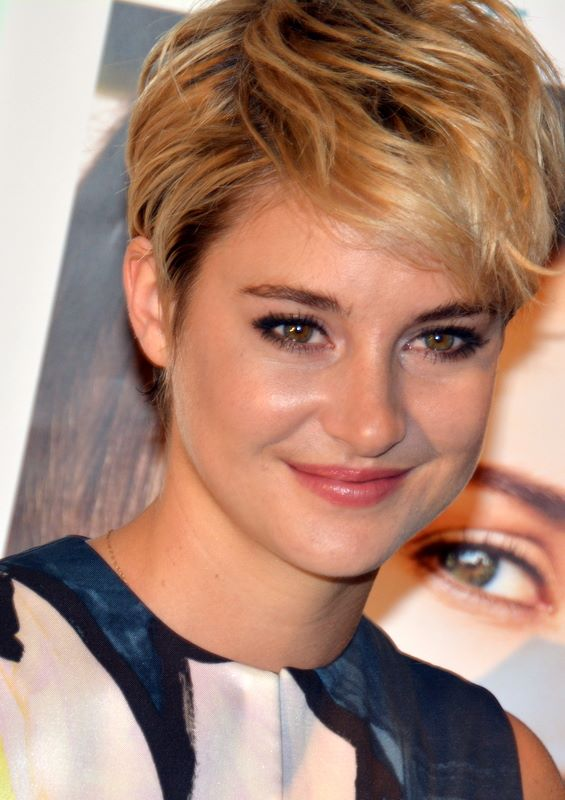
Woodley in October 2014 at the French premiere of White Bird in a Blizzard in Paris

In 2014, Woodley starred as Beatrice "Tris" Prior in the film Divergent, an adaptation of Veronica Roth's best-selling young-adult novel of the same name, and the first installment in The Divergent Series. Woodley was the first and only actress considered for the role of Tris. To prepare for the role, Woodley trained three to five days a week for four weeks in Chicago before shooting for the film began. She had sessions of fight training, gun training, and knife training with stunt coordinator Garrett Warren. Set in a dystopian and postapocalyptic Chicago, the film received mixed reviews, but Woodley's performance as Tris received a positive reception; Sam Allard from Orlando Weekly said, "with her performance as Tris Prior in Divergent, Woodley rescues and then raises up a film that could have been an utter disaster." Divergent reached the number-one spot at the box office during its opening weekend, and was a financial success. Woodley received the 2014 CinemaCon's Female Star of Tomorrow Award.

Also in 2014, Woodley starred as Hazel Grace Lancaster in The Fault in Our Stars, the film adaptation of John Green's novel of the same name. She portrayed a 16-year-old cancer patient who meets and falls in love with Augustus Waters (Ansel Elgort, who also played her brother in the Divergent series), a similarly affected teen from her cancer support group. Green said via Twitter about Woodley; "There were so many amazing auditions for the role of Hazel, but Shailene's love for the book and her understanding of Hazel blew me away." The film was a blockbuster success, grossing over $307 million worldwide. Woodley's performance received critical acclaim; Peter Travers in Rolling Stone called her a "sublime actress with a résumé that pretty much proves she's incapable of making a false move on camera", and Richard Roeper of Chicago Sun-Times called her performance as Hazel Oscar-worthy, adding, "she's that memorable". On November 14, 2014, she received The Hollywood Film Award for Hollywood Breakout Performance – Actress for her depiction of Hazel.

Given her career breakthrough and continuing success since her film debut, she earned a nomination for the BAFTA Rising Star Award in 2015.

=== 2015–2019: Hiatus and mature roles ===
In 2015, Woodley reprised her role as Tris in The Divergent Series: Insurgent, the second installment in The Divergent Series. Her performance received positive reviews, with Daniel M. Kimmel of New England Movies Weekly writing, "Woodley does solid work here as she's done elsewhere, and continues to be someone to watch." Despite a more negative critical reception than the previous film, Insurgent was commercially successful, making nearly $100 million in its worldwide debut and grossed $295.2 million worldwide. She reprised her role again in the final film of the series Allegiant (2016). The film, however, was poorly reviewed by critics and a box-office bomb. Lionsgate had planned for the final film in the series, named Ascendant, to be made for television, but Woodley announced that she would not be a part of it. In an interview with MTV, Woodley clarified that she had every intention of doing the final Divergent installment but she wanted to see its rightful end, and to her, that meant finishing what she, the cast and crew set out to do from the beginning and that is making Ascendant a full-length feature film. She added, "I want to do justice to everybody who believes in the character of Tris as much as I believe in the character of Tris".

She next starred opposite Joseph Gordon-Levitt in Oliver Stone's biographical thriller Snowden (2016), in which Gordon-Levitt portrayed Edward Snowden and Woodley portrayed Lindsay Mills, Snowden's girlfriend. The film made its debut at the Toronto International Film Festival. Owen Gleiberman's review said that Woodley "gives a performance of breathtaking dimension: As the movie goes on, she makes Lindsay supportive and selfish, loving and stricken."

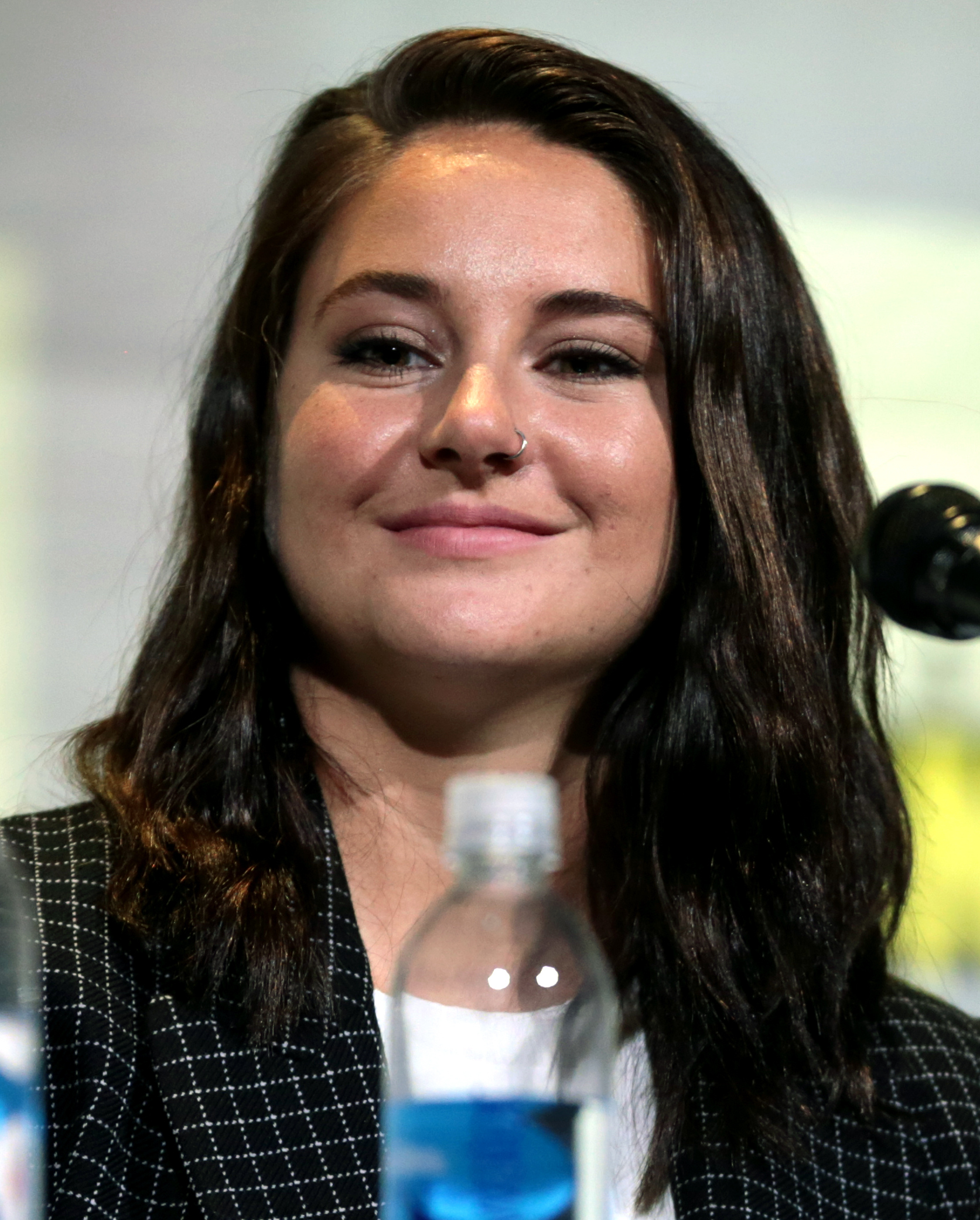
Woodley speaking at San Diego Comic-Con in 2016

Starting in 2015, Woodley took a break from filming for nearly a year and considered quitting as an actor, stating in a later interview that she "had hit a wall with acting" and "felt it was time to do something different". But she eventually "fell in love" with acting again through Big Little Lies.

In 2017, Woodley starred as a sexual assault survivor, alongside Nicole Kidman and Reese Witherspoon, in the HBO critically acclaimed drama series Big Little Lies directed by Jean-Marc Vallée. Sarah Rense of Esquire called Woodley's performance "underrated" and "brought a quiet complexity", adding that "she was the most realistic character" and her "cool demeanor interrupted by sudden, short outbursts – just seemed so real to anyone who thinks more than they talk". She was nominated for an Emmy and Golden Globe Award for Best Supporting Actress in a Limited Series or Movie and Best Performance by an Actress in a Supporting Role in a Series, Limited Series or Motion Picture Made for Television respectively for her role. She reprised her role as Jane Chapman for the second season in 2019.

She also starred in and produced the biographical film Adrift (2018), with Baltasar Kormákur as director. Woodley learned sailing and did her own stunts on the film, ninety percent of which was shot on the open ocean off Fiji. Daniel Feingold from WSVN called her performance as Tami Oldham Ashcraft, a real-life sailor who was stranded at sea after a storm, "Oscar-worthy". Owen Gleiberman of Variety called her "a sensual actress", stating that she "has the gift of making sensuality dramatic; there's a beautiful severity to her features that allows you to feel the things she's showing you. That's a talent, but it's also an instinct". Woodley was awarded the Rising Star Award during the 2018 Deauville Film Festival.

In 2019, Woodley starred in the romantic drama Endings, Beginnings alongside Sebastian Stan, Jamie Dornan, and Matthew Gray Gubler. The film premiered at the Toronto International Film Festival and was introduced as semi-improvised, relying on an 80-page outline. Woodley played Daphne, a contemporary character attempting to get her life on track through self-realization. The film was poorly received with a critical consensus that reads, "Endings, Beginnings smothers its talented ensemble cast's committed work in a carelessly constructed, aimlessly dawdling story". Peter Travers of Rolling Stone said that "it's the performances that carry the day with Woodley raising the bar in every scene".

=== 2021–present: Further film and television work ===
In 2021, Woodley had a supporting role in Kevin Macdonald's real-life Guantanamo Bay drama film The Mauritanian alongside Jodie Foster, Tahar Rahim and Benedict Cumberbatch. She portrayed Teri Duncan, the junior associate of defense lawyer Nancy Hollander (played by Foster). David Ehrlich of IndieWire described Woodley as "overqualified for a role that requires her to do little more than smile and sweat". She had a small role in the critically acclaimed film The Fallout. The appearance was a dedication to her longtime friendship with the film's director Megan Park, her co-star in The Secret Life of the American Teenager. She next starred in and executive produced the romantic drama The Last Letter from Your Lover alongside Felicity Jones, based on the bestselling book by Jojo Moyes. She played Jennifer Stirling, a 1960s married woman caught in an illicit love affair, leading her to discover her place in the society and who she truly loves. Sophie Kaufman of Time Out said, "Woodley has such raw intensity as a performer that she shows up any tired elements of a film production, just as silk shows up polyester".

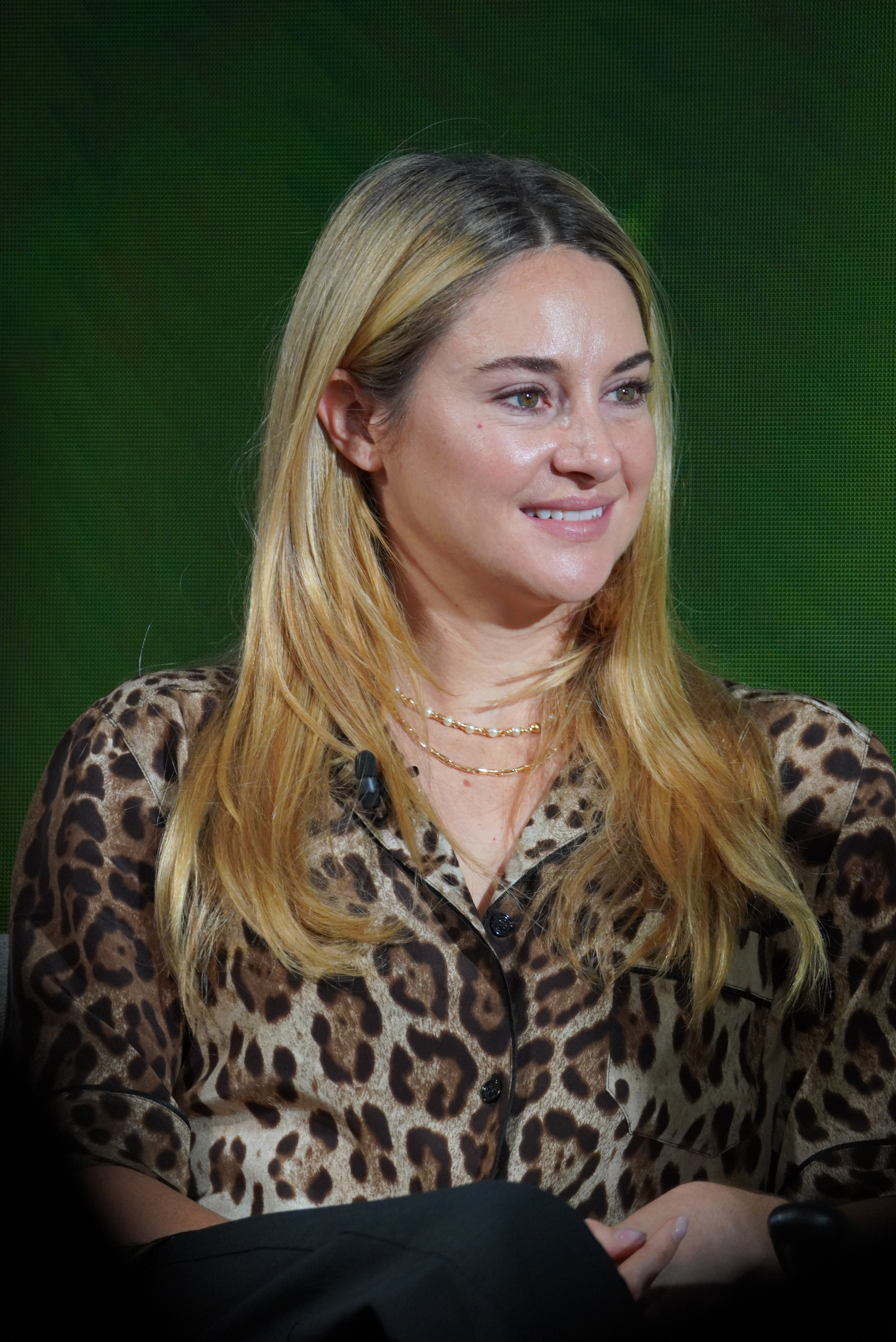
Woodley at an event in 2024

In 2023, Woodley starred in and produced the crime thriller film To Catch a Killer. Directed and co-written by Argentine filmmaker Damián Szifron in his English-language debut, the film is centered on Woodley's character, Eleanor Falco, a talented but troubled cop who is recruited by the FBI to help profile and track down a mass murderer. Rex Reed of Observer said, "Woodley plays it on the verge of mental and physical exhaustion, rubbing the pain from her eye, giving every scene a little something extra" and further stated that she "adds another laurel to her already impressive resume".

She next starred opposite Jack Whitehall in the sci-fi comedy Robots, which is a film directorial debut of the screenwriting duo Anthony Hines and Casper Christensen. Based on Robert Sheckley's 1973 short story The Robot Who Looked Like Me, the film follows a womanizer, Charles (Whitehall), and a gold digger, Elaine (Woodley), who learn humanity when forced to team up and pursue their robot doubles, who have fallen in love and run away together. Woodley told Collider that what made her accept the role of Elaine was "having the opportunity to do a comedy for the first time. But underneath all of the comedy, was this really beautiful message of love". She next appeared in Craig Gillespie's Dumb Money. She portrayed Lina Lardi, mistress of Ferrari founder Enzo Ferrari, in Michael Mann's biopic Ferrari.

Woodley starred as a fictionalized version of author Lisa Taddeo in the drama series Three Women (2024), based on Taddeo's non-fiction book of the same name. She next starred in Philippe Lacôte's mystery thriller Killer Heat (2024), alongside Joseph Gordon-Levitt and Richard Madden, set in Crete, Greece. She made her Broadway debut playing a pregnant religious fundamentalist in the family dramedy play Cult of Love written by Leslye Headland. She acted alongside an ensemble which included Zachary Quinto, Mare Winningham, David Rasche and Barbie Ferreira. She received positive reviews with Lovia Gyarkye of The Hollywood Reporter writing, "Woodley is pitch perfect in a role that requires balancing the comedy with darker undertones." The production ran from November 20, 2024 to February 2, 2025 at the Helen Hayes Theater. For her performance she will be honored with the Theater World Award's Dorothy Loudon Award for Excellence in The Theater. On August 13, 2025, it was announced that Woodley would star in the Hulu limited series Count My Lies alongside Lindsay Lohan and Kit Harington.

== Artistry ==
Early in her career, Woodley admitted to being uneducated about the film and television industry. She said she is drawn to "human scripts" which "are raw, and real, and risky" with her playing "vulnerable scary" characters. She stated, "I'm such a happy, optimistic person in real life for some reason, I have a great time taking out my alter-ego, dark side on screen".

Acting since the age of five, Woodley is not a method nor a classically trained actor. She insisted, "I'm not a good actor, just a professional listener". Over the years, Woodley has altered her acting style by incorporating the method of whoever she's working with.

== Personal life ==
In an interview with The Hollywood Reporter, Woodley said: "I fall in love with human beings based on who they are, not based on what they do or what sex they are". In 2018, she confirmed she was dating Australian-Fijian rugby union player Ben Volavola. In April 2020, Woodley's relationship with Volavola reportedly ended.

Woodley was reported to be in a relationship with NFL quarterback Aaron Rodgers in 2020. In February 2021, Rodgers referred to his "fiancée" during his acceptance speech for the league's MVP award at the NFL Honors ceremony, confirming that he was engaged, but not to whom. Woodley confirmed she was engaged to Rodgers in a February 22, 2021, appearance on The Tonight Show Starring Jimmy Fallon. In February 2022, it was reported that Woodley and Rodgers had ended their engagement.

Woodley and actor Lucas Bravo dated and broke up in 2025.

== Activism ==
=== Activism and protests ===
Woodley is an avid environmental activist and climate advocate. In 2010, she and her mother co-founded the nonprofit organization All it Takes, a youth leadership program that aims to educate young people to practice empathy, compassion, responsibility, and purpose in hopes to foster sustainable, positive change for themselves, others and the environment.

Woodley organized the Up to Us movement, a cross country caravan to the Democratic National Convention. Its goal is to unite Americans, in an act of solidarity, to raise awareness on the political, social and environmental issues political candidates need to address leading up to the elections.

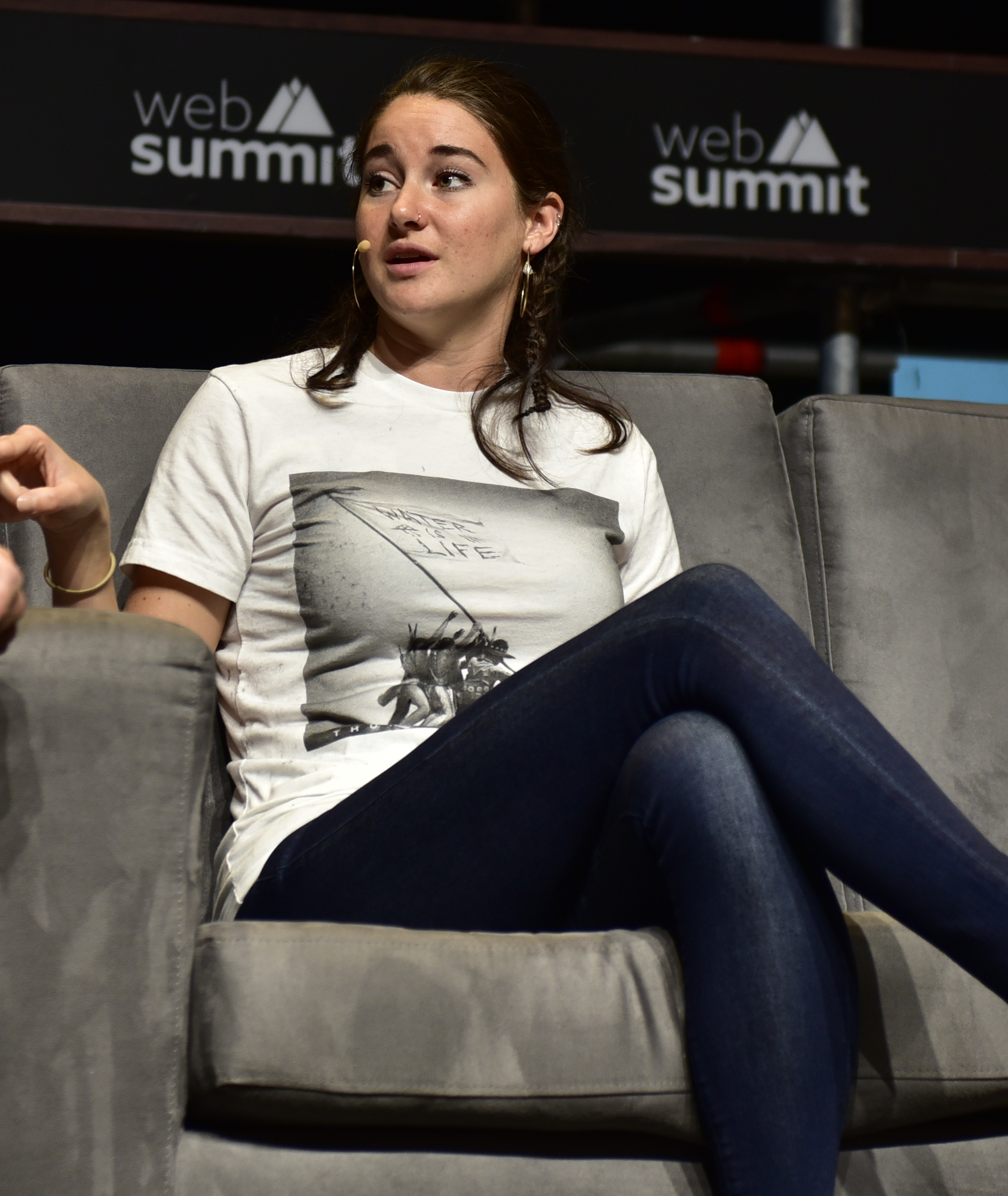
Woodley at Web Summit 2016 – Future Societies, November 2016

In 2016, Woodley protested against the Dakota Access Pipeline, an underground petroleum transport pipeline. She was arrested for criminal trespassing in Saint Anthony, North Dakota. The arrest was broadcast as it happened, as Woodley was about to end her two-hour-long Facebook livestream of the protest. Her mugshot circulated widely on social media platforms along with the hashtags #FreeShailene, #NoDAPL, and #IStandWithStandingRock. Consequently, Woodley gained support from fellow celebrities which created further DAPL discourse.

She was released after she reportedly posted bail for herself and 26 other protestors who had been arrested. Ten days after her arrest, she authored a piece for Time, titled "The Truth About My Arrest", detailing her experience and raising awareness for the environmental and social issues surrounding the cause. She pleaded guilty and was sentenced to a year of probation.

=== Boards and honors ===
Woodley received the Philanthropy Award at Variety's fourth Annual Power of Youth event for her work with All it Takes.

In mid-2016, Woodley joined the board of Our Revolution, a political organization aimed to educate voters about issues, get people involved in the political process, support progressive policies such as Medicare for All, and work to organize and elect progressive leaders. Woodley was one of the speakers at a national town hall event in 2018, titled "Solving Our Climate Crisis", hosted by Our Revolution founder Bernie Sanders.

On September 29, 2016, Woodley was honored at the 20th Anniversary Global Green Environmental Awards, receiving the Entertainment Industry Environmental Leadership Award for co-founding All it Takes. In October 2016, she was given the Female EMA Futures Award during the 26th Annual Environmental Media Association (EMA) Awards. She also received the Advocate Award at the 2016 InStyle Awards. In 2017, the Sierra Club honored Woodley at its 125th Anniversary Trail Blazers Ball, for her grassroots activism.

=== Positions ===
Woodley supported and campaigned for Bernie Sanders for president in 2016 and 2020.

Woodley supports renewable energy. In 2017, she wrote an opinion piece for The Hill, titled "US Should Run on Renewable Energy by 2050". It ultimately gave her the opportunity to introduce the 100 by '50 Act, a bill that calls for the United States to aggressively reduce carbon pollution and achieve 100% clean and renewable energy by 2050, sponsored by Senator Jeff Merkley.

In 2019, she supported Indigenized Energy, a local nonprofit that brings solar energy and jobs to Native Americans. In 2018, Woodley took Suquamish activist and musician Calina Lawrence to the 75th Golden Globe Awards as her guest. They had met at Standing Rock while protesting the Dakota Access Pipeline.

=== Campaigns ===
Woodley has lent her voice to several environmental campaigns such as the Conservation International's Nature Is Speaking series, focusing on its goal to reframe why conservation is important and personify different aspects of nature. She is a member of Conservation International's Leadership Council. She partnered with American Express and Parley for the Oceans on the #BackourOceans initiative to combat marine plastic pollution. She also joined Ocean Unite's 30x30 mission to protect at least 30% of the Earth's oceans by 2030 and the WILDOCEANS's Ocean Impact, promoting the conservation of South Africa's oceans.

In July 2019, Woodley became an Oceans Ambassador for Greenpeace and embarked on a three-week-long expedition to the Sargasso Sea to study the impact of plastics and microplastics on marine life, and to document the importance of this unique ecosystem for protection under a new global ocean treaty that is being negotiated at the United Nations. She wrote a piece for Time, titled "How I'm Changing My Life to Help Save the Seas", chronicling the time she spent on the Greenpeace ship and the actions to take to save the marine life. The expedition reached its desired outcome in March 2023 as the UN Ocean Treaty had finally been agreed at the United Nations. The agreement keeps the 30x30 target –protecting 30% of the world's oceans by 2030 – alive.

In 2022, Woodley became inaugural member of GoodLeap's Advisory Council, which seeks to help the company continue its exponential growth and mission to connect a world where everyone can live more sustainably. In 2023, Woodley joined Greenpeace in Paris, demanding the United Nations create a strong and ambitious Global Treaty that would effectively end plastic pollution. This coincided with the UNEP's second round of Intergovernmental Negotiating Committee meeting, in Paris, which aims to secure a legally binding Global Plastics Treaty.

Woodley is a signatory to the Artists4Ceasefire letter. In 2023, she also appeared in the Italian docufilm Materia Viva focused on Waste from Electrical and Electronic Equipment (WEEE) alongside Susan Sarandon to talk about their care and activism for the environment.

=== Products ===
In 2020, Woodley partnered with Karün, a certified B Corp that creates high-quality eyewear using recycled waste like fishing nets, ropes, and metals collected by local rural entrepreneurs. Their collaboration created the product line Karün by Shailene Woodley, building its identity around the connection of product design with nature protection.

== Filmography ==
Key
†	Denotes film or TV productions that have not yet been released

=== Film ===
Year	Title	Role	Notes
2007	Moola	Ashley Hedges	
2011	The Descendants	Alexandra "Alex" King	
2013	The Spectacular Now	Aimee Finecky	
2014	White Bird in a Blizzard	Katrina "Kat" Connor	
2014	The Fault in Our Stars	Hazel Grace Lancaster	
2014	9 Kisses	Boxing Girl	Short film
2014	The Amazing Spider-Man 2	Mary Jane Watson	Deleted scenes
2014	Divergent	Beatrice "Tris" Prior	
2015	The Divergent Series: Insurgent	Beatrice "Tris" Prior	
2016	The Divergent Series: Allegiant	Beatrice "Tris" Prior	
2016	Snowden	Lindsay Mills	
2016	The Best Democracy Money Can Buy	Herself	Documentary
2017	Awake: A Dream From Standing Rock	—N/a	Documentary, executive producer only
2018	Adrift	Tami Oldham	Also producer
2019	Endings, Beginnings	Daphne	
2021	The Mauritanian	Teresa "Teri" Duncan	
2021	The Fallout	Anna	
2021	The Last Letter from Your Lover	Jennifer Stirling	Also executive producer
2022	The Revolution Generation	Herself	Documentary
2023	To Catch a Killer	Eleanor Falco	Also producer
2023	Robots	Elaine / E2 / E3	
2023	Materia Viva	Herself	Documentary
2023	Ferrari	Lina Lardi	
2023	Dumb Money	Caroline Gill	
2024	Killer Heat	Penelope Vardakis	
2025	Motor City	Sophia Hammond	
2026	Unabomber	Agent Joanne Miller	

=== Television ===
Year	Title	Role	Notes
1999	Replacing Dad	Little Girl	Television film
2001–2003	The District	Kristin Debreno	3 episodes
2001–2004	Crossing Jordan	Young Jordan Cavanaugh	4 episodes
2003	Without a Trace	Young Clare Metcalf	Episode: "Clare de Lune"
2003–2004	The O.C.	Kaitlin Cooper	6 episodes
2004	Everybody Loves Raymond	Snotty Girl #2	Episode: "Party Dress"
2004	A Place Called Home	California "Cali" Ford	Television film
2004–2005	Jack & Bobby	Chloe Benedict	2 episodes
2005	Felicity: An American Girl Adventure	Felicity Merriman	Television film
2005	Once Upon a Mattress	Molly	Television film
2006	My Name Is Earl	Young Gwen	Episode: "BB"
2007	CSI: NY	Evie Pierpont	Episode: "A Daze of Wine and Roaches"
2007	Close to Home	Gaby Tursi	Episode: "Getting In"
2007	Cold Case	Sarah Gunden	Episode: "Running Around"
2007	Final Approach	Maya Bender	Television film
2008–2013	The Secret Life of the American Teenager	Amy Juergens	Main role, 121 episodes
2017, 2019	Big Little Lies	Jane Chapman	Main role, 14 episodes
2024	Three Women	Gia Lombardi	Main role, 10 episodes
2024	Hope in the Water	Herself	Docuseries
2026	Paradise	Annie Clay	Recurring role (season 2)
2027	Count My Lies †	Sloane Caraway	Main role; also executive producer

=== Theater ===
Year	Title	Role	Venue	Ref.
2024	Cult of Love	Diana Dahl Bennett	Helen Hayes Theater, Broadway	

=== Music videos ===
Oscar Isaac's music video credits
Year	Title	Artist(s)	Director(s)	Notes	Ref(s)
2011	"Our Deal"	Best Coast	Drew Barrymore	Stars as a gang member known as a Day Trotter	
2016	"Stand Up / Stand N Rock #NoDAPL"	Taboo	Johnny Lee		
2016	"Where's the Love?"	Black Eyed Peas featuring The World	will.i.am		
2026	"Here"	Mumford & Sons with Chris Stapleton	Bradley J. Calder		

=== Video games ===
Year	Title	Voice role
2016	Allegiant: VR Experience	Beatrice "Tris" Prior
