= San Diego Film Critics Society Award for Best Supporting Actress =

Annual US film award

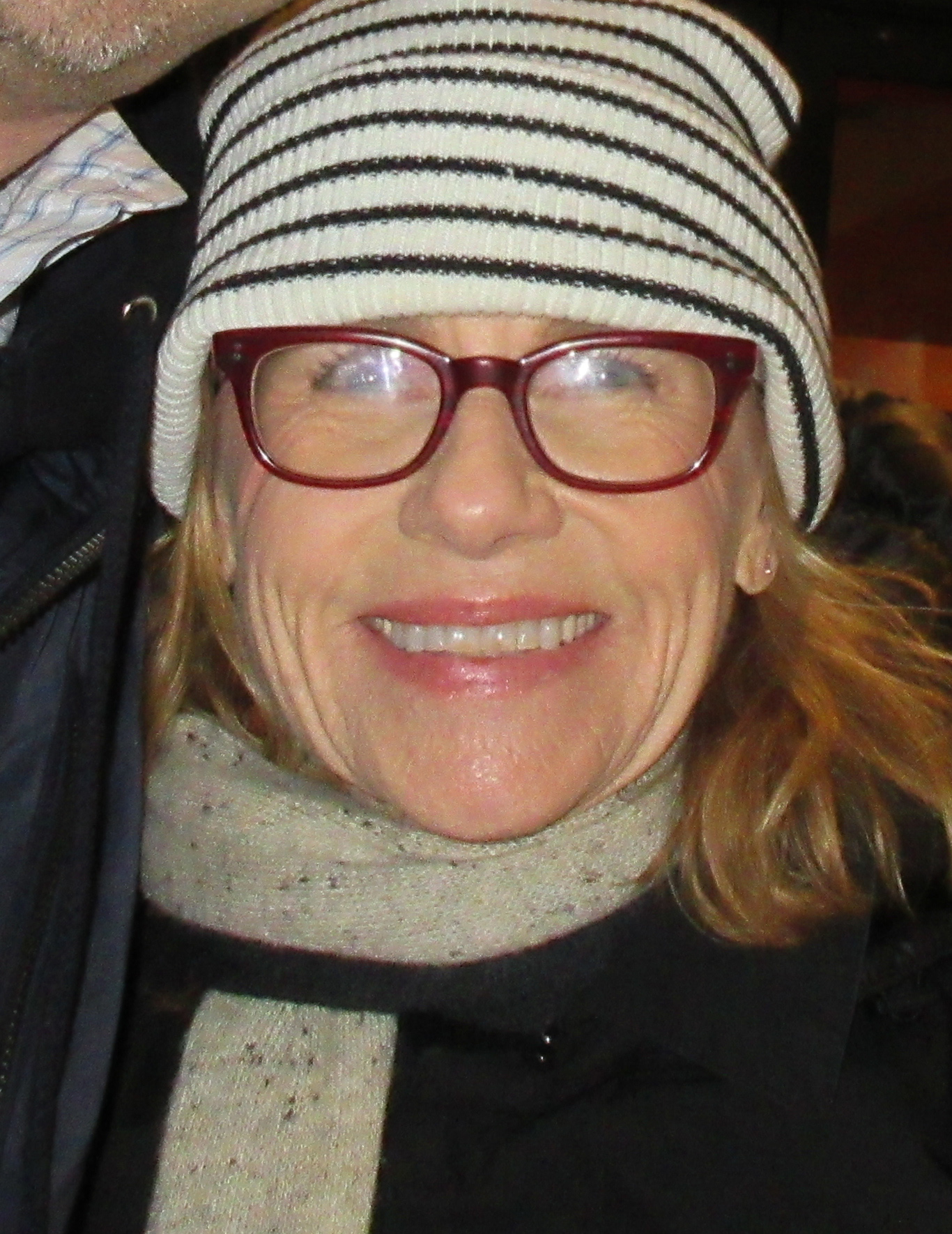
- Current recipient: Amy Madigan
- Awarded for: Best Performance by an Actress in a Supporting Role
- Country: United States
- Presented by: San Diego Film Critics Society
- First award: 1996
- Currently held by: Amy Madigan; Weapons (2025)
- Website: sdfcs.org

The San Diego Film Critics Society Award for Best Supporting Actress is an award given by the San Diego Film Critics Society to honor supporting female acting achievements in film-making.

== Winners ==
=== 1990s ===
Year	Winner	Film	Role
1996	Lauren Bacall	The Mirror Has Two Faces	Hannah Morgan
1997	Jurnee Smollett	Eve's Bayou	Eve Batiste
1998	Kathy Bates	Primary Colors	Libby Holden
1999	Thora Birch	American Beauty	Jane Burnham

=== 2000s ===
Year	Winner	Film	Role
2000	Frances McDormand	Almost Famous	Elaine Miller
2001	Naomi Watts	Mulholland Drive	Betty Elms / Diane Selwyn
2002	Michelle Pfeiffer	White Oleander	Ingrid Magnussen
2003	Renée Zellweger	Cold Mountain	Ruby Thewes
2004	Natalie Portman	Closer	Alice Ayres / Jane Jones
2005	Rachel Weisz	The Constant Gardener	Tessa Quayle
2006	Lili Taylor	Factotum	Jan
2007	Amy Ryan	Gone Baby Gone	Helene McCready
2008	Marisa Tomei	The Wrestler	Pam / Cassidy
2009	Samantha Morton	The Messenger	Olivia Pitterson

=== 2010s ===
Year	Winner	Film	Role
2010	Lesley Manville	Another Year	Mary
2011	Shailene Woodley	The Descendants	Alexandra King
2012	Emma Watson	The Perks of Being a Wallflower	Sam
2013	Shailene Woodley	The Spectacular Now	Aimee Finecky
2014	Rene Russo	Nightcrawler	Nina Romina
2015	Jennifer Jason Leigh	The Hateful Eight	Daisy Domergue
2016	Michelle Williams	Manchester by the Sea	Randi Chandler
2017	Allison Janney	I, Tonya	LaVona Fay Golden
2017	Laurie Metcalf	Lady Bird	Marion McPherson
2018	Nicole Kidman	Boy Erased	Nancy Eamons
2019	Zhao Shu-zhen	The Farewell	Nai Nai

=== 2020s ===
Year	Winner	Film	Role
2020	Youn Yuh-jung	Minari	Soon-ja
2021	Ruth Negga	Passing	Clare Bellew
2022	Kerry Condon	The Banshees of Inisherin	Siobhán Súilleabháin
2023	Rachel McAdams	Are You There God? It's Me, Margaret.	Barbara Simon
2024	Ariana Grande	Wicked	Galinda Upland
2025	Amy Madigan	Weapons	Gladys

== Bibliography ==
- San Diego Film Critics Society - Awards
