= Inside Gatwick =

- Genre: Documentary
- Country of origin: United Kingdom
- Original language: English
- No. of series: 1
- No. of episodes: 8

Production
- Running time: 60 minutes (inc. adverts)

Original release
- Network: Sky1
- Release: 30 August – 18 October 2011

Inside Gatwick is a British documentary reality show. It follows the staff, major renovation and regeneration projects and the day-to-day goings on at Gatwick Airport. It was broadcast on Sky1 from 30 August to 18 October 2011 and the programme is voiced by Ralph Ineson.

== Episodes ==
No.	Title	Original release date	UK viewers (millions)
1	"Keep It Safe"	30 August 2011	0.681
2	"Terminal Life"	6 September 2011	0.583
3	"Baggage"	13 September 2011	Under 0.520
4	"Makeover"	20 September 2011	Under 0.475
5	"Runway"	27 September 2011	Under 0.479
6	"The Airline"	4 October 2011	Under 0.640
7	"Selling Gatwick"	11 October 2011	Under 0.649
8	"The Aeroplane"	18 October 2011	Under 0.605
