= Replacing Dad =

- Based on: Replacing Dad by Shelley Fraser Mickle
- Written by: David J. Hill
- Directed by: Joyce Chopra
- Starring: Mary McDonnell; William Russ; Jack Coleman
- Music by: Lee Holdridge
- Country of origin: United States
- Original language: English

Production
- Producer: Daniel Schneider
- Cinematography: Robert Draper
- Editor: Paul LaMastra
- Running time: 90 minutes

Original release
- Network: CBS
- Release: March 14, 1999

Replacing Dad is a 1999 American television film directed by Joyce Chopra. Based on a Shelley Fraser Mickle novel, the film stars Mary McDonnell, William Russ, Jack Coleman and (a then-unknown) Shailene Woodley in her film debut.

== Plot ==
Linda Marsh is a housewife who seems to have a perfect life. Along with her husband, high school principal George and three loving children Drew, Mandy and Willie, she is living in a suburban house in a small and peaceful town.

One day, Linda decides to surprise George at his office to celebrate their 16th anniversary, and finds him kissing one of the teachers, Ann Marie Scott. Immediately, her life falls apart, and she lands in a roller coaster of emotions.

George initially says he wants to try to save their marriage, but he moves out of the house. They later argue over who should live with the children. To forget her depression, Linda goes out to a bar with a girlfriend and gets drunk, for which George condemns her. He accuses her of bad parenting, while she continues to blame the adultery for everything that is going wrong in the family.

Mandy refuses to speak to her father, and Drew is especially mad at George, because he has always felt unwanted by him. Willie, on the other hand, misses his father enormously and starts acting out by constantly wearing a bunny suit.

Not finding the dog in the yard, Linda storms over to the high school to confront George. She ends up breaking down, begging him to come home. He says he doesn't love her any more.

Little by little, the family gets reorganised. Everyone helps to do odd jobs around the house, including repainting. George stops by on Christmas Eve with the kids' presents and he sees she's getting it together and starting to move on.

On Christmas Day, the kids are at George and Ann Marie's. The kids uncomfortably sit in the pristine living room, told not to make a mess. She fears she's being judged, compared to Linda. Linda is enjoying her alone time when the roofer Tony finally shows. Only, he is there to try and take advantage of her, but she promptly kicks him out.

While trying to get Drew to read a poem over Christmas break, Linda notices he is having difficulties. Believing he has vision problems, she takes him to see Dr. Mark Chandler. (Drew accidentally caused a minor car accident with him a short time ago while practising to drive with her.) He discovers that Drew has dyslexia, which hurts his self-confidence, as he was already struggling with his relationship with his dad.

Mark becomes close to the family, finding extra information about dyslexia and talking Linda into accompanying him to a chamber of commerce New Years eve event. Linda's mother Dixie - who came to town to support her daughter - convinces her to start dating him as he's a widower.

Helping the doctor with an emergency broken arm, Linda distracts the little boy. Mark is impressed and offers her a receptionist job. They continue to see each other, and the kids gradually accept things as they are.

Meanwhile, George finds out that his new life with Ann Marie is not as satisfying as he expected, and he meets with Linda to convince her to try and save their marriage. She almost falls for him again, until he makes a nasty remark. Linda makes a scene and tells him that she can't believe that she was ever in love with him.

Soon after, Ann Marie, annoyed by George's pessimistic behavior, breaks off their relationship. George lands into a severe depression, and one day calls Linda and his children announcing his suicide. Linda and the children rush to the motel where he is staying, and convince him not to shoot himself.

== Cast ==
- Mary McDonnell as Linda Marsh
- William Russ as George Marsh
- Jack Coleman as Dr. Mark Chandler
- Erik von Detten as Drew Marsh
- Camilla Belle as Mandy Marsh
- Tippi Hedren as Dixie
- Stephen Meadows as Charlie Pick
- Cynthia Steele as Lucille
- Michele Abrams as Ann Marie Scott
- Hayden Tank as Willie Marsh
- Michael Dempsey as Sid
- Megan Paul as Julie
- Robb Reesman as Officer Ed
- Lyle Kanouse as Pete
- Sarah Hunley as Janelle
- Clive Rosengren as Mayor
- Rachel Winfree as Dottie
- Jeanette Miller as Miss Pugh
- Pattie Tierce as Teacher
- Shailene Woodley as Little Girl
