= To Catch a Killer (2023 film) =

Film by Damián Szifron

- Theatrical release poster
- Directed by: Damián Szifron
- Written by: Damián Szifron; Jonathan Wakeham
- Produced by: Aaron Ryder; Stuart Manashil; Damián Szifron; Shailene Woodley
- Starring: Shailene Woodley; Ben Mendelsohn; Jovan Adepo; Ralph Ineson
- Cinematography: Javier Juliá
- Edited by: Damián Szifron
- Music by: Carter Burwell
- Production companies: FilmNation Entertainment; RainMaker Films
- Distributed by: Vertical Entertainment
- Release date: April 21, 2023
- Running time: 119 minutes
- Country: United States
- Language: English
- Box office: $3.1 million

To Catch a Killer is a 2023 American crime thriller film directed by Damián Szifron and written by Szifron and Jonathan Wakeham. It stars Shailene Woodley, Ben Mendelsohn, Jovan Adepo and Ralph Ineson. In the film, a talented but troubled young Baltimore cop is recruited by the FBI to help profile and track down a murderer. The film marks Szifron's English-language debut.

Vertical Entertainment gave the film a limited theatrical release in the United States on April 21, 2023, where it received mixed reviews, and grossed $3.1 million.

== Plot ==
As Baltimore sets off its New Years Eve fireworks, an unknown marksman shoots and kills 29 different party goers at different locations from a high rise apartment downtown, then detonates explosives to cover his tracks once Baltimore Police trace the shots.

FBI Agent Geoffrey Lammark is leading the investigation with BPD's cooperation; after briefing the department he overhears officer Eleanor Falco countering a fellow officer's insistence that the shooter is crazy by suggesting "he's swatting mosquitos". Very intrigued by Eleanor's reasoning, Lammark recruits her to join his team as his personal liaison to BPD.

As the investigation proceeds they learn that the shooter is well-trained and has covered his tracks including no link to the apartment he used as a sniper's nest, and a rifle that predates any known arms databases.

The shooter strikes again at a mall when he is confronted by security for allegedly stealing another shopper's clothes from his changing room. Analyzing the security camera footage, Eleanor and Lammark deduce that he was just there to eat, bathe and find new clothes, not instigate another violent act. However, the confrontation with security led to the shooter pulling an Uzi from his duffel bag, killing the guards and numerous shoppers, then rigging a half dozen hand grenades to detonate when the SWAT team closed in.

After the incident, a provocative cable news commentary show host rails against the violence and invites viewers to call in. One such caller is believed to be the shooter, leading to Lammark's superiors ordering him and his team to arrest the man at a cornerstore they traced him to. A shootout ensues, leading to the deaths of the caller's friends and serious injury to one of Lammark's team members, Marquand.

After further questioning it is confirmed the caller is not the shooter, but rather a radical making empty threats towards the show host. The Bureau blames Lammark for the failures of the investigation up to that point and fires him. Upset, Eleanor returns home, where she realizes that one of the individuals they had interviewed previously may have omitted his connection to the shooter.

Eleanor and Lammark unofficially question Lang, who reveals that he began hiring ex-cons for doing some of his jobs when immigrants got too expensive, and he recognized the shooter as a man named Dean he used to employ, noting his veganism which was pointed out on the surveillance footage from the mall. Lang says he asked Dean about that one day and Dean explained he used to work at a slaughterhouse in southern Maryland which turned him off to animal products.

Eleanor and Lammark then trace Dean to one of three slaughterhouses, and find one employee remaining who worked with Dean many years prior named Ramona, who correctly identifies his police sketch as Dean Possey. She noted that when they worked together Dean was bullied by a coworker named Alonso, whom they later discovered dead in the meat grinder. According to Ramona, Dean only served a couple of years for the crime.

This information leads Eleanor and Lammark to Dean's parents' home in rural Maryland, where they meet Dean's mother. Convinced they want to take Dean in alive, she agrees to help but Dean kills Lammark from afar with his rifle. His mother then approaches the shed he shot from and implores him to surrender or kill himself before taking her own life.

Dean then enters the house, and after a long discussion with Eleanor in which he comes to believe she's empathizing with him, he asks her to let him fall asleep and then execute him. She agrees but when the local sheriff arrives, Dean believes Eleanor betrayed him and restrains her in the basement. He then begins shooting the deputies when more deputies and an FBI team including Lammark's second-in-command Jack Mackenzie arrive. Eleanor, though restrained, manages to subdue Dean when she bites his neck leading to significant bleeding. Outside, sitting against a wall, Dean is confronted by the large group of officers, and raises his weapon leading to suicide by police gunfire.

Afterward, at the FBI's headquarters in Baltimore, Eleanor is offered a senior analyst position in the Bureau in exchange for her silence over their malfeasance in the investigation which led to Lammark's death. She reluctantly accepts the offer after negotiating a heroic acknowledgement of Lammark by the Bureau, bargaining for Lammark's husband to get his full pension and demanding to be a special agent instead of an analyst.

== Cast ==
- Shailene Woodley as Eleanor Falco
- Ben Mendelsohn as Geoffrey Lammark
- Jovan Adepo as Jack Mackenzie
- Ralph Ineson as Dean Possey
- Rosemary Dunsmore as Mrs. Possey
- Richard Zeman as Frank Graber

== Production ==
In May 2019, Shailene Woodley joined the cast of the film, then titled Misanthrope, with Damián Szifron directing from a screenplay he co-wrote with Jonathan Wakeham. Woodley also produced the film, which is Szifron's English-language debut. In October 2019, it was announced Mark Strong was in talks to join the cast. In December 2020, Ben Mendelsohn joined the cast. In January 2021, Jovan Adepo was cast. Ralph Ineson was revealed as part of the cast in March 2021.

In May 2019, it was reported that filming would take place in Atlanta that year. Filming took place instead in Montreal, Quebec, Canada from January 27 to March 10, 2021.

== Release ==
In November 2022, Vertical Entertainment acquired U.S. distribution rights to the film. It was retitled from Misanthrope to To Catch a Killer, and released in theaters on April 21, 2023.

== Reception ==
=== Critical response ===
On the review aggregator website Rotten Tomatoes, 52% of 82 critics' reviews are positive, with an average rating of 5.7/10. The website's consensus reads: "Damián David Szifron's stylish direction and fine performances bolster To Catch a Killer's case, but a derivative script throws this thriller off course." Metacritic, which uses a weighted average, assigned the film a score of 43 out of 100, based on 11 critics, indicating "mixed or average" reviews.

=== Box office ===
To Catch a Killer, with a limited theatrical release, grossed $3.1 million, in international territories.
