= Laura Eason =

American playwright and screenwriter

- Education: Northwestern University
- Occupations: Playwright, Screenwriter

Laura Eason is an American playwright and screenwriter.

== Biography ==
Eason grew up in Evanston, IL. She graduated from Northwestern University, before becoming an ensemble member at Lookingglass Theatre Company, where she served as an actor, director, as well as Artistic Director from 2000 until 2005.

Eason's plays include both original works and adaptations. Her play Sex With Strangers had its world premiere at Chicago's Steppenwolf Theatre in 2011. In 2014, the play was presented Off-Broadway at Second Stage Theater. The play went on to become one of the most produced plays in America during both the 2015-2016 and 2016-2017 seasons.

She was a writer for four seasons on the Netflix drama House of Cards, and was a producer on Season 5. For House of Cards, Eason received an Emmy Nomination for Drama Series, and a Writers Guild of America Award Nomination for Outstanding Writing in a Drama Series.

Her writing and producing credits for television also include The Loudest Voice for Showtime, and Three Women for Starz.

Eason's feature film debut, Here and Now (formerly Blue Night), developed by and starring Sarah Jessica Parker, premiered at the Tribeca Film Festival.

== Plays and productions ==
=== Original work ===
- Remarkable Invisible - World premiere, Theatre by the Lake, Cumbria, UK, 2017
- Undeniable Sound of Right Now - World premiere, Rattlestick Theatre/WP Productions, NYC, 2015; Published by Dramatists Play Service
- Sex With Strangers - World premiere, Steppenwolf Theatre, Chicago, 2011; Sydney Theatre, AU, 2012; Second Stage, NYC, 2014; Hampstead Theatre, London, 2017; Published by Dramatists Play Service, Overlook Press
- 40 Days - World premiere, University of Wisconsin, 2010
- Rewind - World premiere, Side Project, Chicago, 2009; Published in Out of Time & Place: An Anthology of Plays by Members of the WP Playwrights Lab
- Area of Rescue - World premiere, Andhow Theatre, NYC, 2007
- They All Fall Down: The Richard Nickel Story, co-written with Jessica Thebus - World premiere, Lookingglass Theatre Company, 2001

=== Adaptations ===
- Hans Brinker and the Silver Skates, adapted from the novel by Mary Mapes Dodge - World premiere and commission, Arden Theatre, PA, 2016; Barrymore nomination, Best New Work
- Around the World in 80 Days adapted from the novel by Jules Verne - World premiere, Lookingglass Theatre, 2008; KC Rep, Baltimore Centerstage, 2010; Jeff Award Nominations, Best Adaptation and Best Production; Published by BPPI and Nick Hern Books
- Ethan Frome, adapted from the novel by Edith Wharton - World premiere and commission, Lookingglass Theatre Company, 2011; Jeff Award nomination, Best Adaptation
- The Adventures of Tom Sawyer, adapted from the novel by Mark Twain- New Victory, NYC, 2012; World premiere and commission, Hartford Stage, CT, 2010; Published by Dramatists Play Service
- When The Messenger Is Hot, adapted from the book of short stories by Elizabeth Crane - World premiere, Steppenwolf Theatre, Chicago and 59E59, NYC, 2008; Published by BPPI
- The Ghosts Bargain, adapted from the short story by Charles Dickens - World premiere and commission, Two River Theatre, 2007
- Huck Finn, adapted from The Adventures of Huckleberry Finn by Mark Twain - World premiere, Steppenwolf Theatre, Chicago, 2007;
- Old Curiosity Shop, co-written by Raymond Fox and Heidi Stillman adapted from the novel by Charles Dickens - World premiere, Lookingglass Theatre Company, 2006; Jeff Award, Best Adaptation
- Coast of Chicago, adapted from the book of short stories by Stuart Dybek - World premiere, Walkabout Theatre, Chicago, 2006; Jeff Award Nomination, Best Adaptation
- A Tale of Two Cities, adapted from the novel by Charles Dickens - World premiere, Steppenwolf Theatre, Chicago, 2004; Published by Playscripts

=== Musical books ===
- Days Like Today, with music and lyrics by Alan Schmuckler - World premiere and commission by Writers Theatre, Chicago, 2014

=== Short plays ===
- At 7th And 7th, part of Morning in America, Primary Stages, NYC, 2017
- 12A, 12B, Pinebox Theatre, Chicago, 2012
- Mr. Smitten, Humana Festival, Louisville, KY 2011, (published in Humana Festival 2011: The Complete Plays by Playscripts)
- Lost in the Supermarket, Vital Theatre, NYC, 2007
