= Ralph Ineson =

English actor and narrator (born 1969)

- Ineson in 2025
- Born: Ralph Michael Ineson; 15 December 1969 (age 56); Leeds, England
- Occupations: Actor; narrator; writer
- Years active: 1989–present
- Height: 6 ft 3 in (191 cm)
- Spouse: Ali Milner (m. 2003)
- Children: 2

Ralph Michael Ineson (/ˈaɪnsən/ EIN-sən; born 15 December 1969) is an English actor, narrator and writer. His film roles include Amycus Carrow in the final three Harry Potter films (2009–2011), William in The Witch (2015), the title character in The Green Knight (2021), Dr. Wilhelm Sievers in Nosferatu (2024), and Galactus in The Fantastic Four: First Steps (2025).

His television roles include Chris Finch in The Office (2001–2003), Dagmer Cleftjaw in Game of Thrones (2012), and Nikolai Tarakanov in Chernobyl (2019). His video game voice work includes Charles Vane in Assassin's Creed IV: Black Flag (2013) and Assassin's Creed IV: Black Flag Resynced (2026), Lorath Nahr in Diablo IV (2023) and Diablo IV: Lord of Hatred (2026), Cid in Final Fantasy XVI (2023) and Sheath in High on Life 2 (2026).

== Early life and education ==
Ralph Michael Ineson was born on 15 December 1969 and grew up in Leeds.

He attended Woodleigh School and Pocklington School. He studied theatre at Lancaster University's Furness College; after his first year, he moved into a flat in Lancaster and took a security job at The Dukes, helping out at its open-air Shakespeare productions in Williamson Park.

== Career ==
=== Film ===
Ineson's early Hollywood film credits include First Knight, From Hell, Sex & Drugs & Rock & Roll and a brief role in The Damned United. He played Amycus Carrow, a Death Eater, in Harry Potter and the Half-Blood Prince, Harry Potter and the Deathly Hallows – Part 1 and Part 2. He also appeared in the 2008 film Cass, as Sergeant Mullins. In 2014, he appeared in the Marvel Studios film Guardians of the Galaxy. Also in 2014, he had a small role in the spy film Kingsman: The Secret Service, playing a policeman who interviews Eggsy.

In 2016, Ineson starred alongside Anya Taylor-Joy and Kate Dickie in Robert Eggers's critically acclaimed debut film The Witch, which saw Eggers win Best Director at the 2015 Sundance Film Festival. Ineson later credited Eggers and the film as offering him a career breakthrough stating: "(Eggers) gave me this amazing part in an amazing film with other incredible actors, and that changed everything for me. It gave me a lot of confidence in myself that if it came down to it, I did actually have the chops to be able to play a character with a proper arc and some nuance. It was much more than I’d been given to play with before, and that led to more work with Rob and also Steven Spielberg, the Coen brothers and all sorts of amazing filmmakers."

Ineson appeared in a minor role as a First Order officer in the 2017 film Star Wars: The Last Jedi. His role was originally bigger, but most of his performance was cut. The cut material is available in a deleted scene on the 2018 Blu-ray release of the film. Between 2018 and 2024, he appeared in prominent supporting roles in Ready Player One, The Ballad of Buster Scruggs, Everybody's Talking About Jamie, The Green Knight (as the title character), The Tragedy of Macbeth, The Northman, Catherine Called Birdy, To Catch a Killer (as the titular serial killer), The Creator and Nosferatu.

In 2025, Ineson portrayed the gigantic Marvel Comics planet-eating supervillain Galactus in the Marvel Cinematic Universe (MCU) film The Fantastic Four: First Steps. Ineson was offered the part without having to audition. Speaking about his preparation for the part, which he performed in heavy armour, Ineson said "There were little crosses of electric tape on the floor, which is why you have to do the preparation work for the character long before you set foot on set. The day-to-day job of getting the character onto screen is more of a physical challenge, but to make that cross of tape on the floor real in your own mind, you have to have your emotional memory ready to go. So I went to the tallest buildings I could find to have Galactus’ perspective, and when I was looking down at the floor, I could see that perspective, not just a piece of tape."

=== Television ===
Ineson appeared in the music video for the 1996 song "My Kingdom" by Future Sound of London. He played the recurring character Chris Finch in the BBC comedy The Office. He starred as Donald Bamford in the sitcom Goodnight Sweetheart, as Zack in the soap opera Coronation Street, and played ex-soldier Sam Walker in the first series of Spooks. He played Luke Mullen in the BBC drama Playing the Field. He had a minor part in episode four of the first series of BBC drama This Life. He starred in Suburban Shootout, which aired on Paramount Comedy and Five. He played Frank Monk in series 7 of Waking the Dead in the episode "Wounds". He played pirate Dagmer Cleftjaw in the second season of HBO's Game of Thrones. He also appeared in an Imperial Leather advert as a fireman.

Ineson had a minor role in the fifth and sixth series of BBC drama Waterloo Road in 2009 playing the role of John Fry. He had a small role in an episode of Channel 4 comedy The IT Crowd, as Paul, a buttock-kissing masseur, in the series four episode "Something Happened". In the 2012 ITV Titanic mini-series he played Steward Hart. In 2016, he appeared in the third season of the BBC Two series Peaky Blinders, playing the part of Connor Nutley. He has also appeared in the HBO series Chernobyl, and in The Dark Crystal: Age of Resistance for Netflix.

=== Voice work ===
Ineson has used his distinctive, deep, gravelly Yorkshire accent in a variety of voice-over work. He has narrated TV programmes Licence to Drill, Salvage Hunters on the Discovery Channel, the 2010 Sky TV series Inside Gatwick, and the BBC1 series Claimed and Shamed.

From 2012 to 2013, Ineson voiced Gunvald Larsson in The Martin Beck Killings, a series of BBC Radio dramatisations adapting all ten of the class Martin Beck crime novels by Maj Sjöwall and Per Wahlöö.

In 2013, he voiced the Channel 4 series Skint which followed the lives of British families from underprivileged backgrounds. In 2015, he narrated Countryside 999 on BBC One. In 2009, he narrated the BBC One documentary Series Gears and Tears which follows the characters of British BriSCA Formula 1 Stock Cars.

On video games, he voiced Charles Vane in Assassin's Creed IV: Black Flag, Lorath Nahr in Diablo IV and Diablo IV: Lord of Hatred, and Cidolfus Telamon in Final Fantasy XVI.

He is also the voice on the introduction of the Leeds United FC football podcast The Square Ball.

In 2024, Ineson voiced a barbecue in an advert for Prostate Cancer UK.

== Personal life ==
In 2003, Ineson married Ali Milner. They have two children; one of them, Rebecca Ineson, is an actress herself.

Ineson filed a lawsuit against Disney in December 2023, claiming that he suffered from permanent shoulder damage due to injuries he sustained while filming the Disney+ series Willow.

== Filmography ==
=== Film ===
Year	Title	Role	Notes
1994	Syrup	Skinhead	Short film
1994	Shopping	Dix	
1995	First Knight	Ralf	
1997	Shooting Fish	Mr. Ray	
2001	From Hell	Gordie	
2001	South West 9	Liam	
2007	The Last Thing to Go Through a Fly's Mind		Short film
2007	Shoot on Sight	Marber	
2007	Cass	Sergeant Mullins	
2008	Is Anybody There?	Mr. Kelly	
2009	The Damned United	A crazy wild-haired reporter	
2009	Suicide Man	DJ (voice)	Short film
2009	Harry Potter and the Half-Blood Prince	Amycus Carrow	
2010	Sex & Drugs & Rock & Roll	The Sulphate Strangler	
2010	Robin Hood	Northerner	
2010	Another Year	Drill Worker	
2010	Harry Potter and the Deathly Hallows – Part 1	Amycus Carrow	
2011	Harry Potter and the Deathly Hallows – Part 2	Amycus Carrow	
2011	Intruders	Alarm Installer	
2012	Great Expectations	Sergeant	
2013	The Selfish Giant	Johnny Jones	
2014	Guardians of the Galaxy	Ravager Pilot	
2014	Kingsman: The Secret Service	Policeman	
2015	The Witch	William	
2016	The Huntsman: Winter's War	Barkeep	
2017	Star Wars: The Last Jedi	Colonel Ansiv Garmuth	
2018	The Hurricane Heist	Connor Perkins	
2018	Ready Player One	Rick	
2018	The Ballad of Buster Scruggs	Posse Leader	Segment: "Near Algodones"
2020	Dolittle	Arnall Stubbins	
2020	Brahms: The Boy II	Joseph	
2020	Here Are the Young Men	Mr. Landerton	
2021	Edge of the World	Sir Edward Beech	
2021	Everybody's Talking About Jamie	Wayne New	
2021	Gunpowder Milkshake	Jim McAlester	
2021	The Green Knight	The Green Knight	
2021	The Last Victim	Jake	
2021	The Tragedy of Macbeth	The Captain	
2022	The Northman	Captain Volodymyr	
2022	Catherine Called Birdy	Golden Tiger	
2023	The Pope's Exorcist	Asmodeus (voice)	
2023	To Catch a Killer	Dean Possey	
2023	The Creator	General Andrews	
2023	Lord of Misrule	Jocelyn Abney	
2024	The First Omen	Father Brennan	
2024	Nosferatu	Dr. Wilhelm Sievers	
2025	The Fantastic Four: First Steps	Galactus	
2025	Frankenstein	Professor Krempe	
2026	Two Neighbors	Genie	Post-production
2026	Werwulf	Tall Hunter	Post-production

=== Television ===
Year	Title	Role	Notes
1993	Spender	Alex	Episode: "Best Friends"
1993–2009	The Bill	Alan Trent / Greg Simm / Robert Carmichael / Paul Gibson / Billy Wylie / Derek Crew	8 episodes
1994	All Quiet on the Preston Front	Iggy	Episode: "Diesel's Garage"
1994	99-1	Brian	Episode: "The Cost of Living"
1994	Royce	Newfold	Television film
1994	The Cinder Path	Arthur Benton	Miniseries
1994	Screen Two	Policeman	Episode: "O Mary This London"
1995	Harry	Wayne	Episode: "#2.5"
1995	Out of the Blue	Ricki Sellars	Episode: "#1.2"
1995	Chandler & Co	Roderick Tully	Episode: "End of Term"
1996	Goodnight Sweetheart	Donald	Episode: "There's Something About a Soldier"
1996	This Life	Jessop	Episode: "Sex, Lies and Muesli Yoghurt"
1996	Kiss and Tell	Sergeant Beddowes	Television film
1997	Kavanagh QC	DCI Chris Sampson	Episode: "The Ties That Bind"
1998	Dangerfield	Jake Gilmore	Episode: "Local Colour"
1998	Children of the New Forest	William Hammond	Television film
1998–2002	Playing the Field	Luke Mullen	32 episodes
1998, 2005	Heartbeat	Tel Philips / Corporal Fisher	2 episodes
1999	Touching Evil	Chris Wray	2 episodes
1999	Bostock's Cup	Clive Kennard	Television film
2001–2003	The Office	Chris Finch	7 episodes
2002	Spooks	Sam Walker	Episode: "One Last Dance"
2002	Holby City	Dale Warner	Episode: "Calculated Risks"
2002, 2011	Doctors	Billy Hollins / Martin Davies	2 episodes
2003	The Afternoon Play	Rob Coles	Episode: "The Real Arnie Griffin"
2003	In Deep	Craig	Episode: "Character Assassins: Part 1"
2003	Thursday the 12th	Collins	Television film
2003	Strange	Bill	Episode: "Dubik"
2003	Between the Sheets	Mark Ainsley	6 episodes
2004	Black Books	Richard (voice)	Episode: "Moo-Ma and Moo-Pa"
2004	Blue Murder	Bob Urwin	Episode: "Lonely"
2004	A Line in the Sand	Det. Sgt. Bill Davies	Miniseries
2005	The Walk	Lawrence	Television film
2005	Murder in Suburbia	William Marshal	Episode: "Dogs"
2005	Coronation Street	Zack	9 episodes
2005	ShakespeaRe-Told	Barry	Episode: "Macbeth"
2005	The Virgin Queen	Dr. William Cowes	2 episodes
2005, 2008	Casualty	Raymond Thurber / Martin Woodbridge	2 episodes
2006	Missing	DCI John Carter	2 episodes
2006	Dalziel and Pascoe	James Maddern	Episode: "The Cave Woman"
2006	The Only Boy for Me	Lawrence	Television film
2006	Losing It	Mr. Granger	Television film
2006–2007	Suburban Shootout	Jeremy Hazledine	11 episodes
2007	Die Ludolfs – 4 Brüder auf'm Schrottplatz	Narrator (voice)	Episode: "Flower Power in Dernbach"
2007	Lead Balloon	Bob Marlin	Episode: "Giraffe"
2008	Waking the Dead	Frank Monk	Episode: "Wound" Parts 1 & 2
2008	New Tricks	D.I. Hamilton	Episode: "Mad Dogs"
2009–2010	Waterloo Road	John Fry	9 episodes
2010	The IT Crowd	Paul the Masseur	Episode: "Something Happened"
2010	Merlin	Jarl	Episode: "The Coming of Arthur: Part One"
2011	The Body Farm	Miles Leyton	Episode: "You've Got Visitors"
2011–2012	Case Sensitive	DC Colin Sellers	Four-part miniseries
2011–present	Salvage Hunters	Narrator (voice)	All episodes
2012	Game of Thrones	Dagmer Cleftjaw	5 episodes
2012	Secret State	Sgt. Wrigglesworth	Four-part miniseries
2012	Titanic	Steward Hart	Four-part miniseries
2013	Pramface	DS Sullivan	Episode: "Tinker, Tiger, Lobster"
2013	Count Arthur Strong	Roger the Policeman	Episode: "Arthur.com"
2013	Vera	Ross Strachan	Episode: "Prodigal Son"
2013	Ambassadors	Captain Jones	Episode: "The Tazbek Spring"
2014	Inspector George Gently	Arthur Hawkes	Episode: "Gently Going Under"
2014	New Worlds	Stackpole	2 episodes
2015	Drunk History	King Henry II	Episode: "Episode Seven"
2015	Bluestone 42	Mike Slater	Episode: "#3.2"
2015	The Interceptor	Yorkie	Episode: "Episode 6"
2015	Prey	DCI Mike Ward	3 episodes
2016	Peaky Blinders	Connor Nutley	2 episodes
2016	Porridge	Richie Weeks	Television special
2017	Sherlock	Vince	Episode: "The Final Problem"
2017	Absentia	Adam Radford	10 episodes
2017	Star vs. the Forces of Evil	Demoncist (voice)	Episode: "Demoncism/Sophomore Slump"
2018	Rapunzel's Tangled Adventure	Cutter (voice)	Episode: "Beyond the Corona Walls"
2018	Agatha and the Truth of Murder	Detective Inspector Dicks	Television film
2019	Chernobyl	General Nikolai Tarakanov	2 episodes
2019	The Dark Crystal: Age of Resistance	The Hunter (skekMal) (voice)	Netflix series 7 episodes
2019	The Capture	DCI Alex Boyd	6 episodes
2022	Trigger Point	Commander Bregman	2 episodes
2022	Willow	Commander Ballantine	3 episodes
2023	The Legend of Vox Machina	Kevdak (voice)	3 episodes
2023	The Gallows Pole	The Clothier	Three-part television series
2023	My Dad the Bounty Hunter	Widowmaker	Voice
2024	The Jetty	D.I. Morgan	Four-part television series
2024–present	Ludwig	Chief Constable Ziegler	8 episodes
2025	Wolf King	Leopold	Voice
2025	Foundation	Archduke Bellarion	1 episode
2025	Tales of the Teenage Mutant Ninja Turtles	Rahzar	Voice, 3 episodes

=== Stage ===
Year	Title	Role	Notes
1989	Jackets	NCO	Lancaster University
1992	York Mystery Plays	Herod's Heavy; Willox	York Theatre Royal
2015	Hangmen	Inspector Fry	Royal Court Theatre

=== Video games ===
Year	Title	Role
2011	Harry Potter and the Deathly Hallows – Part 2	Amycus Carrow
2013	Assassin's Creed IV: Black Flag	Charles Vane
2023	Final Fantasy XVI	Cidolfus "Cid" Telamon
2023	Diablo IV	Lorath Nahr
2026	Assassin's Creed Black Flag Resynced	Charles Vane
2026	High on Life 2	Sheath
2026	Diablo IV: Lord of Hatred	Lorath Nahr

== Awards and nominations ==
Year	Award	Category	Film	Result	Ref
2007	Golden Nymph Awards	Outstanding Actor - Comedy Series	Suburban Shootout	Nominated	
2016	BloodGuts UK Horror Awards	Best Supporting Actor	The Witch	Nominated	
2016	Fright Meter Awards	Best Supporting Actor	The Witch	Nominated	
2017	Fangoria Chainsaw Awards	Best Supporting Actor	The Witch	Nominated	
2024	British Academy Games Awards	Performer in a Supporting Role	Final Fantasy XVI	Nominated	
