= Three Women (book) =

2019 non-fiction book by Lisa Taddeo

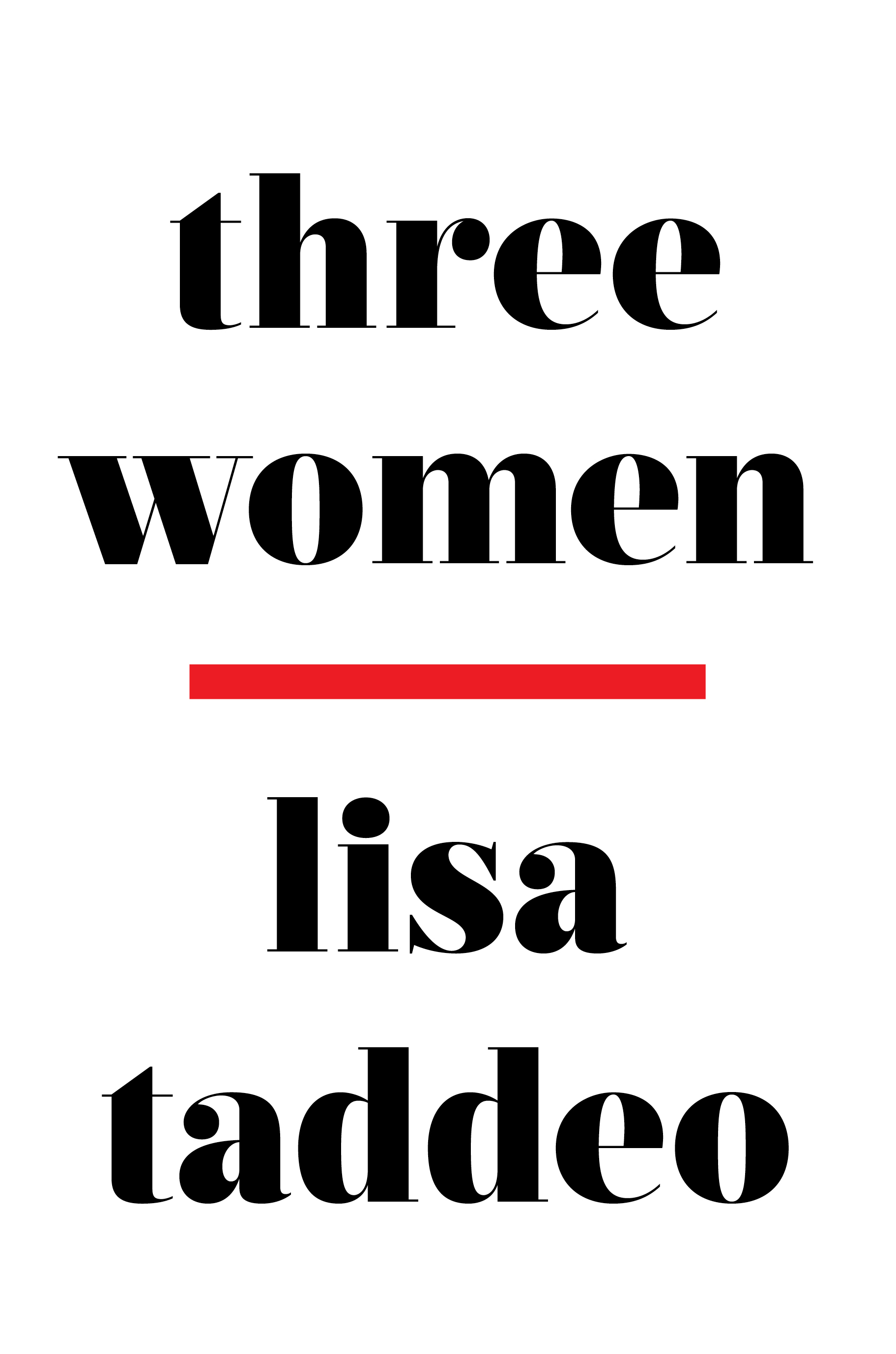
- First edition cover
- Author: Lisa Taddeo
- Audio read by: Tara Lynne Barr; Marin Ireland; Mena Suvari; Lisa Taddeo
- Language: English
- Subject: Human female sexuality
- Publisher: Avid Reader Press
- Publication date: July 9, 2019
- Publication place: United States
- Media type: Print (Hardcover)
- Pages: 320
- ISBN: 978-1-4516-4229-2
- Dewey Decimal: 306.7082
- LC Class: HQ801 .T2233 2019

Three Women is a 2019 non-fiction book by Lisa Taddeo. It is her debut book and was published on July 9, 2019, by Avid Reader Press, an imprint of Simon & Schuster. It covers the sexual and emotional lives of three women from different backgrounds and regions of the United States. It debuted at number one on The New York Times non-fiction best sellers list and received mostly positive reviews from critics.

== Summary ==
The book covers the sexuality of three women: Lina, a suburban Indiana mother whose teenage rape disrupts the course of her life; Maggie, a seventeen-year-old high school student in North Dakota who becomes entangled in an illegal affair with her married English teacher; and Sloane, a successful restaurant owner in the Northeast whose husband watches her have sex with other men and women at her request. Taddeo spent eight years writing the book, driving across the country six times to embed herself in the lives of the three women.

== Publication ==
Three Women was published on July 9, 2019, by Avid Reader Press, an imprint of Simon & Schuster.

Three Women debuted at number one on The New York Times Combined Print & E-Book Nonfiction best-sellers list on July 28, 2019. It spent eleven weeks on the list.

The book also debuted at number two on The New York Times Hardcover Nonfiction best-sellers list on July 28, 2019. It spent eleven weeks on the list.

== Reception ==
In June 2020 it won the narrative non-fiction book of the year at the British Book Awards.

== Television series ==
In July 2019, Showtime gave a series commitment to a television adaptation of the book. In July 2021, the project gave production a series order with Shailene Woodley starring and Taddeo as executive producer. In February 2023, the series was moved to Starz.
