= Skint (2005 TV series) =

British documentary series

- Genre: Documentary
- Created by: BBC
- Narrated by: David Morrissey (series 1 & 2 specials); Dean Lennox Kelly (series 2 & 1 special)
- Country of origin: United Kingdom
- No. of seasons: 2
- No. of episodes: 13 & 3 specials

Production
- Executive producer: Julian Mercer
- Producer: Chris Hutchins
- Running time: 30–40 minutes
- Production company: BBC

Original release
- Network: BBC One
- Release: 2005 – 2009

Skint is a British documentary series that debuted on BBC One in 2005. The series follows the lives of Britain's poor, unemployed and homeless people as they manage day to day with little money and low job prospects. The show broadcast two series and an additional three specials.

== Episodes ==
=== Series 1 ===
No. overall	No. in season	Title	Original release date
1	1	"Episode 1"	N/A
A regular Pawnshop customer tries to get his girlfriend's jewellery back, while a Big Issue seller is forced to pawn his guitar, and a busker puts his livelihood on the line to pay his rent.
2	2	"Episode 2"	N/A
A couple facing a charge of assault against the police have financial troubles - and find themselves under further pressure when their son is excluded from school. Vernon hatches a money-making scheme to supplement his Big Issue earnings and Bob decides there's no future in busking and plans to become a pub singer.
3	3	"Episode 3"	N/A
Bob prepares for his first gig, in an Irish pub that perhaps isn't the ideal venue for his particular brand of Country and Western music. A heroin addict tries to quit, and is determined to buy his five-year-old son a birthday present for the first time, while Vernon visits a car-boot sale.
4	4	"Episode 4"	N/A
A DJ pawns his decks, then faces a race against time to raise the money to buy them back. Vernon finds demand for the Big Issue at an all-time low while his debts pile up, while Bob's recent disastrous gig has left him completely broke.
5	5	"Episode 5"	N/A
Tom and Tara await the birth of their baby, but their financial situation is not improving, while Vernon has nearly all his resources tied up in the buy-back shop. A theatrical family struggle to pay for their children's singing and acting classes - especially since their eldest daughter has a big show coming up.
6	6	"Episode 6"	N/A
Bob sees a keyboard in the pawn shop and vows to have it - but raising the money could prove tricky. Martin's partner, Carmel, is furious when he spends their holiday money on heroin, and a couple rely on the pawnbrokers to get them through financial problems caused by debt and redundancy.
7	7	"Episode 7"	N/A
A newlywed couple pawn their wedding rings before facing a day in court, a 19-year-old gets a job as a lapdancer to clear her debts and a wheeler-dealer looks for bargains at the buy-back shop.
8	8	"Episode 8"	N/A
Tara's baby is born, but Tom's health continues to deteriorate. Bob the busker starts a new business venture with a friend, while Vernon returns from psychiatric care full of hope for the future.

=== Series 2 ===
No. overall	No. in season	Title	Original release date
9	1	"Episode 1"	N/A
Big Issue seller Vernon Burgess continues his fight against homelessness, while Gaz and his father Ken supplement their benefits by scavenging from skips.
10	2	"Episode 2"	N/A
Long-term Big Issue seller Vernon Burgess decides on a career change and invests in collectibles, and the programme follows mother-of-five Tara Walsh's new life in Birmingham, where she has moved to flee her children's alcoholic father. Meanwhile, Tony prepares for his first job interview in 23 years, just as his partner Kath receives a court summons for assault.
11	3	"Episode 3"	N/A
A 27-year-old heroin addict plans to see his mother as he looks forward to a rare Christmas outside of prison, and Vernon busks to raise cash for his own festive celebrations. Meanwhile, a gambling addict pawns his watch to fuel a few more hours on the fruit machines.
12	4	"Episode 4"	N/A
Andy Williams is forced to pawn £500 worth of his family's possessions after learning his new job will pay monthly, not weekly, and Tony continues to struggle with debt as he splits up with his girlfriend. Meanwhile, Nick gets an unexpected boost when he is given two free television sets.
13	5	"Episode 5"	N/A
Tony finally gets a job for the first time in 11 years, but misses his ex-girlfriend Kath, and decides to try to win her back. Gaz struggles to find somewhere to live, and Italian Salvatore reveals why he is short of money, despite working as a waiter.

=== Specials ===
Episode	Description	Date
1	"No Home Special"	N/A
2	"Hard Christmas Special"	N/A
3	"Debt Special"	January 2009
