= The Spectacular Now =

2013 film directed by James Ponsoldt

- Theatrical release poster
- Directed by: James Ponsoldt
- Screenplay by: Scott Neustadter; Michael H. Weber
- Based on: The Spectacular Now by Tim Tharp
- Produced by: Tom McNulty; Shawn Levy; Andrew Lauren; Michelle Krumm
- Starring: Miles Teller; Shailene Woodley; Brie Larson; Mary Elizabeth Winstead; Bob Odenkirk; Jennifer Jason Leigh; Kyle Chandler
- Cinematography: Jess Hall
- Edited by: Darrin Navarro
- Music by: Rob Simonsen
- Production companies: 21 Laps Entertainment; Andrew Lauren Productions; Global Produce
- Distributed by: A24
- Release dates: January 18, 2013 (Sundance); August 2, 2013 (United States)
- Running time: 95 minutes
- Country: United States
- Language: English
- Budget: $2.5 million
- Box office: $6.9 million

The Spectacular Now is a 2013 American coming-of-age romantic drama film directed by James Ponsoldt, from a screenplay written by Scott Neustadter and Michael H. Weber, based on the 2008 novel of the same name by Tim Tharp. It stars Miles Teller and Shailene Woodley as high-schoolers Sutter and Aimee, whose unexpected encounter leads to a romance blossoming between the two. Brie Larson, Mary Elizabeth Winstead, Bob Odenkirk, Jennifer Jason Leigh, and Kyle Chandler are featured in supporting roles.

The film premiered at the 2013 Sundance Film Festival, and was theatrically released in the United States on August 2, 2013 where it garnered critical acclaim and grossed over $6 million worldwide. It received two nominations at the 29th Independent Spirit Awards: Best Female Lead (for Woodley) and Best Screenplay.

== Plot ==
Sutter Keely is a charming and popular 18-year-old who has spent his senior year of high school partying and drinking alcohol. After his girlfriend Cassidy breaks up with him, Sutter writes in a college application essay that his biggest hardship in life is getting dumped. Then, he sneaks into a bar and gets blackout drunk.

The next morning, Sutter is awoken on a front lawn by Aimee Finecky, a girl in his grade whose name he does not know. She is in the middle of her mother's paper route, so he joins her to find his car. They arrange to have lunch that week, where he asks her to tutor him in geometry, then he asks her to a party. When she confesses she has never been drunk before, never had a boyfriend, and does not think she can go to college because her mother needs her help, Sutter tells her that she is not responsible for her mother, before complimenting and kissing her.

Waking up hungover, Sutter realizes he asked Aimee to prom at the party. He avoids her at school and goes to Cassidy's house. The exes get drunk and reminisce, but Cassidy ultimately tells Sutter that they have no future together, and asks him to leave.

After Aimee's friend warns Sutter not to hurt Aimee, he takes her to dinner at his sister Holly's house. There, Aimee talks frankly about the death of her father from an opioid overdose and her dreams of a perfect marriage.

Sutter and Aimee's relationship grows more serious, and they have sex. Afterward, he reveals his mother Sara kicked his father Tommy out when he was a child and has forbidden Sutter from seeing him. The pair make a pact to stand up to their mothers.

On prom night, Aimee appreciates Sutter's gift of a personalized flask. After the dance, she tells him that she is going to college in Philadelphia near her sister, who can help her find an apartment and a job. Aimee asks Sutter to come with her and go to junior college, and he hesitantly agrees.

Getting Tommy's phone number from Holly, Sutter arranges to meet up with his father to attend a baseball game. He brings Aimee with him, but, when they arrive, Tommy admits he forgot about their plans, and instead takes the teens to a local bar. During a brief conversation with Sutter, Tommy reveals he left his family, rather than being kicked out by Sara, before leaving with his girlfriend, who is upset to just be learning he has a son. Tommy asks Sutter to pick up the tab and meet him at his motel, but fails to arrive, and Sutter and Aimee find him back at the bar drinking with his friends. Disillusioned, Sutter drives away.

Aimee attempts to comfort Sutter and says she loves him, but, angry and drunk, he snaps at her. After almost causing an accident, he tells her that he is bad for her and forces her out of the car. Crying and not paying attention to the road, Aimee is clipped by a passing car. Her arm is broken, but she forgives Sutter.

Following their graduation ceremony, Sutter refuses a drink from Aimee and talks with Cassidy, who tells him that she is moving to California with her boyfriend. Later, Sutter's boss tells Sutter that he can only afford to keep one employee and wants to keep Sutter, who is good with customers, but only if he no longer comes to work drunk. Unable to guarantee his sobriety, Sutter quits.

Aimee cannot get hold of Sutter the night they are to catch a bus to Philadelphia, leaving her to make the trip alone, heartbroken and confused. He gets drunk at a bar and manages to make it home, though he runs over his mailbox. After a cathartic argument with Sara, Sutter reassesses his life and completes the college application essay, despite having missed the submission deadline, confessing that his biggest hardship is himself, and his insistence on living only for the moment has been a defense mechanism. He drives to Philadelphia and finds Aimee as she is leaving class. They make eye contact, but her expression is inscrutable.

== Cast ==
- Miles Teller as Sutter Keely
- Shailene Woodley as Aimee Finecky
- Brie Larson as Cassidy Roy, Sutter's ex-girlfriend
- Mary Elizabeth Winstead as Holly Keely, Sutter's older sister
- Bob Odenkirk as Dan, Sutter's boss
- Kaitlyn Dever as Krystal, Aimee's friend
- Andre Royo as Mr. Aster
- Masam Holden as Ricky, Sutter's friend
- Dayo Okeniyi as Marcus West, Cassidy's new boyfriend
- Jennifer Jason Leigh as Sara Keely, Sutter and Holly's mother
- Kyle Chandler as Tommy Keely, Sutter and Holly's absent father
- Gary Weeks as Joe, Holly's husband

== Production ==
The rights to Tharp's novel were first acquired by Fox Searchlight Pictures in 2009. Marc Webb, who had already directed Neustadter and Weber's script for 500 Days of Summer (2009), was set to direct the film. According to Ponsoldt, Webb left the film to work on The Amazing Spider-Man (2012), and Searchlight lost the rights after that.

Principal photography commenced in Athens, Georgia, in July 2012, and wrapped a month later. While the novel is set in Oklahoma, director Ponsoldt decided to shoot in his hometown, explaining:

The script didn't identify where it was set – the setting just wasn't a big city. It felt vaguely suburban – or kind of like a college town. It seemed to me that the script had a sense of place in the way that Breaking Away did. Athens was such an obvious candidate as a setting to shoot the film in – and it was really the only place I wanted to make the film. Filming in Athens was incredibly meaningful to me. We shot in the streets and houses of my childhood!

== Reception ==
=== Box office ===
On August 2, 2013, The Spectacular Now opened in four theaters in North America, ranking #30 at the weekend box office with a gross of $197,415 (an average of $49,354 per theater). Ultimately, it was released in 770 theaters domestically and earned $6.9 million; counting an additional $63,980 from international screenings, it earned a total of $6.9 million at the box office, against its $2.5 million budget.

=== Critical response ===
The film was warmly received at the 2013 Sundance Film Festival. On the review aggregator website Rotten Tomatoes, it has an approval rating of 92% based on 169 reviews, with an average rating of 7.8/10; the site's "critics consensus" reads: "The Spectacular Now is an adroit, sensitive film that avoids typical coming-of-age story trappings." On Metacritic, the film has a score of 82 out of 100, based on reviews from 42 critics, indicating "universal acclaim".

Roger Ebert, in his final four-star review, stated:

Here is a lovely film about two high school seniors who look, speak and feel like real 18-year-old middle-American human beings. Do you have any idea how rare that is? They aren't crippled by irony. They aren't speeded up into cartoons. Their sex lives aren't insulted by scenes that treat them cheaply [...] What an affecting film this is. It respects its characters and doesn't use them for its own shabby purposes. How deeply we care about them. Miles Teller and Shailene Woodley are so there. Being young is a solemn business when you really care about someone. Teller has a touch of John Cusack in his Say Anything period. Woodley is beautiful in a real person sort of way, studying him with concern, and then that warm smile. We have gone through senior year with these two. We have known them. We have been them.

Richard Roeper of the Chicago Sun-Times also gave the film four stars out of four, describing it as "the best American movie of the year so far". He summarized his review by adding: "The Spectacular Now will bring you back to that time in your life when you were trying to soak in every moment, because everyone told you there's nothing better than your last year in high school." In The Hollywood Reporter, critic Todd McCarthy called the film "a sincere, refreshingly unaffected look at teenagers and their attitudes about the future. [...] Ordinary in some ways and extraordinary in others, The Spectacular Now benefits from an exceptional feel for its main characters on the parts of the director and lead actors."

Dana Stevens of Slate also praised both of the leads, commenting that "Miles Teller and Shailene Woodley have such a disarmingly direct and spontaneous connection as actors that Sutter and Aimee almost immediately come to seem like a couple you've known (or been part of) at some point in your life. [...] The Spectacular Now captures the beauty and scariness and lacerating intensity of first love". Entertainment Weekly critic Owen Gleiberman described the film as "one of the rare truly soulful and authentic teen movies." He compared it favorably to Say Anything... and The Perks of Being a Wallflower, saying "like them, it's a movie about the experience of being caught on the cusp and truly not knowing which way you'll land."

In Variety, critic Rob Nelson wrote: "The scars and blemishes on the faces of the high-school lovers in The Spectacular Now are beautifully emblematic of director James Ponsoldt's bid to bring the American teen movie back to some semblance of reality, a bid that pays off spectacularly indeed." Cinema Blend called the film "the rare Sundance coming-of-age story that feels like it matters", adding: "The Spectacular Now is an instant MVP of the first half of the festival, with potential breakout hit written all over it. [...] you'll be hearing a lot about this one down the road, and it's got the goods to live up to the hype." Phoebe Reilly of Spin called the film "the next great teen movie" and "truly remarkable". She acclaimed Teller and Woodley for their "absurdly natural performances", with Sutter "uniquely irresistible" and Aimee "a perfect repertoire of nervous giggles and awkward mannerisms."

=== Accolades ===
At the 2013 Sundance Film Festival, The Spectacular Now received the Special Jury Award for Acting.

List of awards and nominations
Award	Date of ceremony	Category	Recipients	Result
Alliance of Women Film Journalists	December 16, 2013	Best Adapted Screenplay	Scott Neustadter and Michael H. Weber	Nominated
Alliance of Women Film Journalists	December 16, 2013	Best Breakthrough Performance	Shailene Woodley	Nominated
Alliance of Women Film Journalists	December 16, 2013	Best Depiction of Nudity, Sexuality or Seduction Award	Shailene Woodley and Miles Teller	Nominated
Gotham Awards	December 2, 2013	Best Actress	Shailene Woodley	Nominated
Independent Spirit Awards	March 1, 2014	Best Screenplay	Scott Neustadter and Michael H. Weber	Nominated
Independent Spirit Awards	March 1, 2014	Best Female Lead	Shailene Woodley	Nominated
National Board of Review	December 4, 2013	Top Ten Independent Films	The Spectacular Now	Won
San Diego Film Critics Society	December 11, 2013	Best Supporting Actress	Shailene Woodley	Won
San Francisco Film Critics Circle	December 15, 2013	Best Adapted Screenplay	Scott Neustadter and Michael H. Weber	Nominated
Seattle International Film Festival	June 9, 2013	Youth Jury Award for Best FutureWave Feature	The Spectacular Now	Won
St. Louis Film Critics Association	December 16, 2013	Best Adapted Screenplay	Scott Neustadter and Michael H. Weber	Nominated
Sundance Film Festival	January 26, 2013	Special Jury Award for Acting	Miles Teller and Shailene Woodley	Won
Sundance Film Festival	January 26, 2013	Grand Jury Prize: U.S. Dramatic	James Ponsoldt	Nominated
Washington D.C. Area Film Critics Association	December 9, 2013	Best Adapted Screenplay	Scott Neustadter and Michael H. Weber	Nominated
