= Tami Oldham Ashcraft =

American sailor and author

- Born: Tami Lee Oldham; 20 February 1960 (age 66); San Diego, California, US
- Occupations: Sailor and author
- Known for: Surviving 41 days adrift in the Pacific Ocean
- Spouse: Edward Ashcraft (m. 1994)
- Children: 2

Map of the 1983 dismasting. 1: Departure, 2: Dismasting, 3: Arrival

Tami Lee Oldham Ashcraft (née Oldham) (born February 20, 1960) is an American sailor and author who, in 1983, survived 41 days adrift in the Pacific Ocean. Her story inspired the 2018 film Adrift.

== 1983 dismasting ==
In 1983, Ashcraft's fiancé, 34-year-old British sailor Richard Sharp, was hired to deliver the 43-foot (13 m) yacht Hazaña from Tahiti to San Diego. The then 23-year-old Ashcraft accompanied him on the crossing. The couple set sail from Papeete Harbor on September 22.

On October 12, the vessel was caught in the path of Hurricane Raymond. As the ship was being hit by 40-foot (12 m) waves and 140-knot (72 m/s) winds, Sharp sent Ashcraft below deck. Moments later, she heard him scream, "Oh, my God!" The yacht capsized and Ashcraft was thrown against the cabin wall and knocked unconscious. When she regained consciousness about 27 hours later, Sharp was gone and the Hazaña was severely damaged: the cabin was half-flooded, the masts had broken off the yacht, and the radio and navigation system were inoperable.

Ashcraft rigged a makeshift sail from a broken spinnaker pole and a storm jib (a triangular sail) and fashioned a pump to drain the cabin. Due to the boat damage and the local wind conditions, she determined that her original route to San Diego was no longer viable and decided instead to make the 1,500-mile (2,400 km) journey to Hawaii.

Without a radio navigation system, Ashcraft was forced to navigate the yacht manually with the help of a sextant and a watch. She survived mainly on canned food during this time. On November 22 – 41 days after the dismasting – Ashcraft reached Hilo, Hawaii.

== Bibliography ==
- 2002: Red Sky in Mourning: A True Story of Love, Loss, and Survival at Sea by Tami Oldham Ashcraft and Susea McGearhart.
