= Lisa Taddeo =

American author and journalist

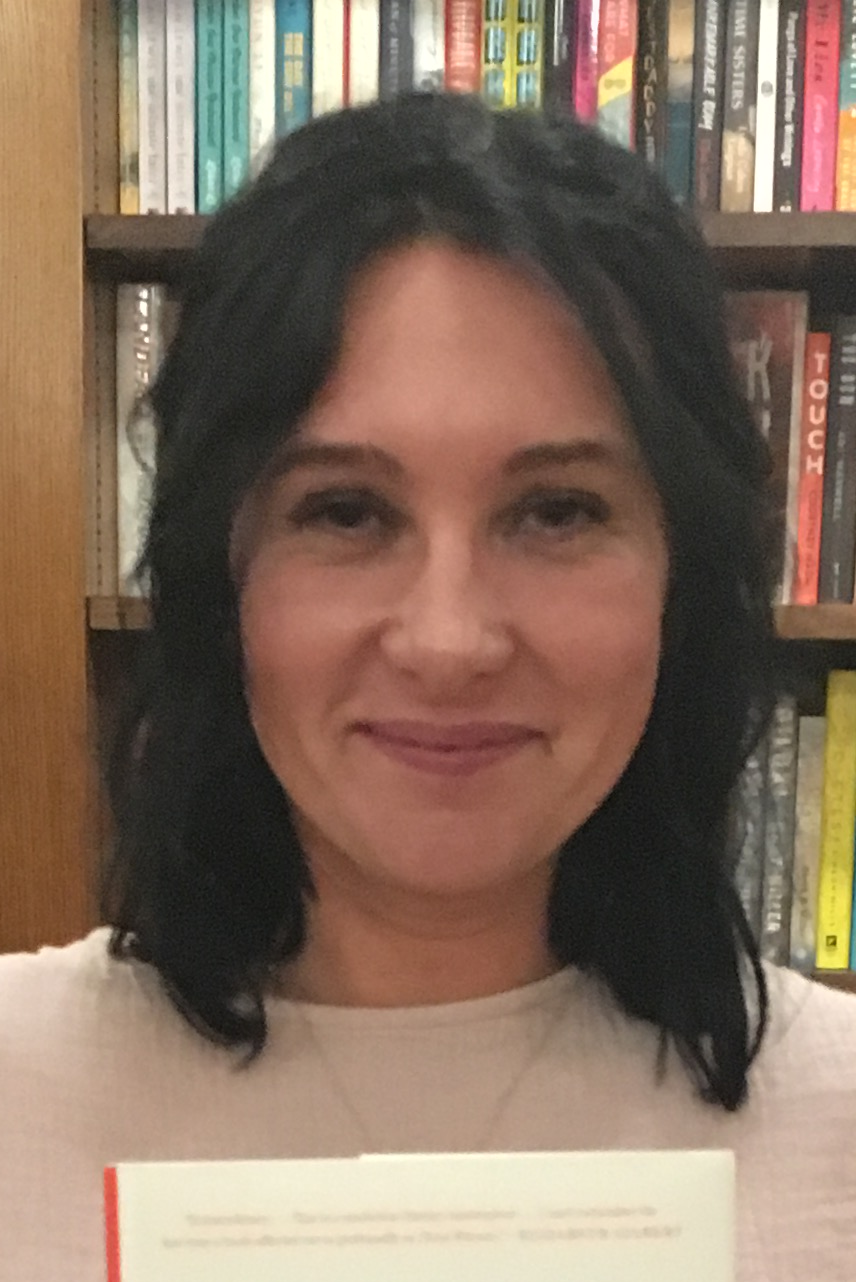
- Taddeo in 2019
- Born: January 1980 (age 46); Short Hills, New Jersey, U.S.
- Education: New York University (attended); Rutgers University (BA); Boston University (MFA)
- Spouse: Jackson Waite
- Children: 1
- Writing career
- Notable work: Three Women (2019)
- Notable awards: Pushcart Prize (2017, 2019); British Book Awards (2020)
- Website: Official website

Lisa Taddeo is an American author and journalist known for her book Three Women. Taddeo's work has appeared in The Best American Political Writing and The Best American Sports Writing anthologies.

== Early life ==
Taddeo was raised in the Short Hills section of Millburn, New Jersey, where she attended Millburn High School, graduating in 1998. Her parents are Peter Taddeo, an Italian American doctor, and Pia, a fruit stand cashier from Italy.

== Education ==
She first attended New York University but transferred to Rutgers University. Taddeo completed her Master of Fine Arts in fiction at Boston University.

== Writing ==
=== Early career ===
Taddeo was an associate editor at Golf Magazine when David Granger assigned her first piece for Esquire, titled "The Last Days of Heath Ledger", after reading her unpublished manuscript. She later appeared in Esquire Network's 80th Anniversary special in 2013.

The Washington Post recognized her New York piece, "Rachel Uchitel is Not a Madam", as one of their top five long reads that stand the test of time.

Taddeo has since received the William Holodnok Fiction Prize and the Florence Engel Randall Award in fiction.

She is a two-time recipient of the Pushcart Prize, recognized for her short stories "42 (2017)", published in the New England Review, and "Suburban Weekend (2019)", published in Granta.

=== Later work ===
Her book Three Women was released in July 2019 by Simon and Schuster. In June 2020, it won the Narrative Non-Fiction Book of the Year at the British Book Awards.

Taddeo's debut novel, Animal, was published by Avid Reader Press in the summer of 2021 and explores themes of "both sisterhood and female rage..."

Her third book, Ghost Lover, is a collection of nine short stories published in 2022 by Avid Reader Press.

== Adaptions ==
In July 2019, Showtime announced a series commitment adaptation of Three Women. Taddeo will write and be executive producer of the series. It premiered on Starz in 2024.

== Awards ==
Year	Book	Award	Category	Result	Ref
2019	Three Women	Foyles Books of the Year	Non-Fiction	Won	
2020	Three Women	Australian Book Industry Awards	International Book	Shortlisted	
2020	Three Women	BookTube Prize	Nonfiction	Octofinalist	
2020	Three Women	British Book Awards	Non-fiction: Narrative	Shortlisted	
2020	Three Women	Gordon Burn Prize	—	Shortlisted	
2021	Animal	Center for Fiction First Novel Prize	—	Longlisted	
2022	Animal	McKitterick Prize	—	Runner-up	

== Bibliography ==
=== Nonfiction ===
- Three Women (2019)

=== Novel ===
- Animal (2021)

=== Short story collection ===
- Ghost Lover (2022)
