= Adrift (2018 film) =

2018 film by Baltasar Kormákur

- Theatrical release poster
- Directed by: Baltasar Kormákur
- Written by: Aaron Kandell; Jordan Kandell; David Branson Smith
- Based on: Red Sky in Mourning: A True Story of Love, Loss, and Survival at Sea by: Tami Oldham Ashcraft; Susea McGearhart
- Produced by: Baltasar Kormákur; Aaron Kandell Jordan Kandell; Shailene Woodley
- Starring: Shailene Woodley; Sam Claflin
- Cinematography: Robert Richardson
- Edited by: John Gilbert
- Music by: Volker Bertelmann
- Production companies: STXfilms; Lakeshore Entertainment; H. Brothers; Ingenious Media; RVK Studios
- Distributed by: STX Entertainment (United States); Myndform (Iceland)
- Release date: June 1, 2018 (United States)
- Running time: 96 minutes
- Countries: United States; Iceland; Hong Kong
- Languages: English; Icelandic
- Budget: $35 million
- Box office: $59.9 million

Adrift is a 2018 survival drama film produced and directed by Baltasar Kormákur and written by David Branson Smith, Aaron Kandell, and Jordan Kandell. The film is based on the 2002 book Red Sky in Mourning by Tami Oldham Ashcraft, a true story set during the events of Hurricane Raymond in 1983. The film stars Shailene Woodley and Sam Claflin as a couple who are adrift in the middle of the Pacific Ocean after a hurricane, and must find their way to Hawaii with a damaged boat and no radio.

Adrift was released in the United States on June 1, 2018 by STXfilms and received mixed reviews from critics, who praised the performances and the cinematography but criticized the familiar narrative.

== Plot ==
Five months before the hurricane, Tami Oldham arrives in Tahiti on board the schooner Sofia and meets Richard Sharp, a British sailor. He invites her for dinner aboard his boat Mayaluga. They spend more time together and begin to plan a trip to sail to Japan.

While downtown one day, Tami and Richard bump into Peter and Christine Crompton, owners of Hazaña, a luxury Trintella 44 yacht. The Cromptons offer Richard $10,000 and a return first-class ticket back to Tahiti to sail Hazaña to San Diego, California. He accepts the offer, on the condition that Tami come along and that they also give her a return ticket. Later, he proposes to Tami with a handmade ring, and she accepts.

The couple depart aboard Hazaña, and after many uneventful days at sea, Tami and Richard receive news of an approaching cyclone, Hurricane Raymond. However, they decide to continue to San Diego anyway.

As the storm hits, Tami tries to radio for help, with no response. The storm alters course and the yacht enters the eye of the storm. Richard and Tami have no choice but to lower the sails to prevent the boat from capsizing.

Tami almost falls off the yacht as she is hit by powerful waves. Richard professes his love for her and demands that she go below where she will be safer. Hazaña is repeatedly flipped as she is hit by a towering wave. Tami is thrown about, suffering a head wound.

Richard is thrown overboard after being knocked unconscious by the mast and his safety harness breaks. He slowly sinks into the ocean, while Hazaña is flipped, rights herself, and floats to the surface.

Tami regains consciousness and struggles to understand what has happened. She urgently searches the crippled yacht in hopes of finding Richard and realizes that he was swept overboard. She screams in anguish and it is revealed that she is all alone, with no ships or land in sight. Tami finds that the engine will not start, and no one hears her radioed distress calls.

Tami believes she has spotted the lost dinghy with Richard clinging to it, and she tries to steer the yacht towards him. She falls off and nearly drowns as she swims to rescue Richard. After dragging him aboard, Tami realizes that he has broken ribs and a shattered right shin. She fashions a makeshift sail using a broken pole and a storm jib, allowing her to sail toward Hawaii.

One night, she sees a large cargo ship heading straight for Hazaña and fires multiple flares, but the ship sails on past them. Tami wonders if she has been hallucinating, and Richard begins to suffer from a high fever. As the sun rises the next morning, Richard reminds Tami that a red morning sky warns of an approaching storm. Expecting a storm to hit, Tami prepares by creating a makeshift shelter, though the storm turns out to be just a minor squall.

The next day, Richard has disappeared. Tami realizes that the injured Richard on board Hazaña was nothing but a hallucination and surrenders to the reality that Richard was lost at sea. On the 41st day, Tami finally spots land and a Japanese research vessel in the distance and fires off two flares, successfully attracting its attention.

The vessel lowers food and water supplies to Tami and tows Hazaña to shore. Tami returns to Tahiti after recovering and visits Richard's boat, bursting into tears after seeing the photos of Richard and herself. She goes to the beach with a frangipani flower, places her engagement ring around the flower, and lets it go in the water.

It is revealed in the credits that Richard Sharp was swept overboard and never found; Tami Oldham Ashcraft survived alone aboard Hazaña for a total of 41 days before she was rescued. She continues to be an avid sailor. During the credits, a series of news articles, pictures and a video of the actual Tami and Richard are shown.

== Cast ==
- Shailene Woodley as Tami Oldham
- Sam Claflin as Richard Sharp
- Jeffrey Thomas as Peter Crompton
- Elizabeth Hawthorne as Christine Crompton
- Grace Palmer as Deb

== Production ==
Adrift was acquired by STX Entertainment in February 2017. The studio was set to produce and distribute the film, starring Shailene Woodley as Tami Oldham, and directed by Baltasar Kormákur from a script by Aaron & Jordan Kandell. The Kandells and Woodley also produced the film, along with Kormákur through his RVK Studios, and Ralph Winter. In April 2017, Miles Teller entered into negotiations to co-star opposite Woodley, whom he had collaborated with four times prior. However, in May 2017, Sam Claflin joined the film in the role meant for Teller, who had to pass due to "scheduling conflicts".

Principal photography on the film began in July 2017 in Fiji, and lasted five weeks. The cast and crew took two-hour boat rides into the ocean every day, and Woodley stated many members were seasick over the course of filming.

=== Music ===
"Where's My Love" by SYML was featured in the first trailer for Adrift, which was released on March 14, 2018. "Song for Zula" by Phosphorescent was featured in the final trailer, released on May 7, 2018.

Academy Award-nominated composer Hauschka composed the original score for the film. The film's soundtrack includes his original score, and a cover of Tom Waits's "I Hope That I Don't Fall In Love With You", by Emilíana Torrini. Also featured in the film but not on the soundtrack is "Picture In A Frame" by Waits, which is played during a montage scene of Tami Oldham Ashcraft before the end credits. The soundtrack has been released by Sony Classical and is available on Apple Music, Spotify, and Amazon Music.

== Release ==
Adrift was released on June 1, 2018 in the United States by STX Entertainment. The film's $35 million production was mostly covered by foreign presales, totalling up to $20 million. STX accounted for $3 million out of the film's remaining $15 million budget (co-financed by Lakeshore Entertainment, Huayi Brothers, Ingenious), with an additional $25 million spent on prints and advertising.

=== Home media ===
Adrift was released by Universal Pictures Home Entertainment, in collaboration with STXfilms, on Digital HD on August 21, 2018 and DVD and Blu-ray on September 4, 2018. Special features include deleted scenes, 3 featurettes, theatrical trailers as well as a feature commentary by director Baltasar Kormákur and leading actress and producer Shailene Woodley.

== Reception ==
=== Box office ===
Adrift grossed $31.4 million in the United States and Canada, and $28.5 million in other territories, for a total gross of $59.9 million, against a production budget of $35 million. In the United States and Canada, Adrift was released alongside Action Point and Upgrade, and was projected to gross $10–15 million from 3,015 theaters in its opening weekend. The film made $4.2 million on its first day, including $725,000 from Thursday night previews. It went on to debut to $11.6 million, finishing third, behind Solo: A Star Wars Story and Deadpool 2; 62% of its audience was female, with 69% being over the age of 25. The film fell 55% to $5.3 million in its second week, finishing sixth.

=== Critical response ===
On Rotten Tomatoes, the film has an approval rating of 69% based on 202 reviews, and an average rating of 6.1/10. The website's critical consensus reads, "Adrift sails smoothly between love story and survival drama, thanks in large part to a gripping central performance from Shailene Woodley." On Metacritic, the film has a weighted average score of 56 out of 100, based on 31 critics, indicating "mixed or average" reviews. Audiences polled by CinemaScore gave the film an average grade of "B" on an A+ to F scale.

David Ehrlich of IndieWire gave the film a "B−" and praised Woodley's performance, saying: "When all else fails, which it sometimes does, Woodley is there to right the ship. She's eminently believable as a whip-smart, hyper-capable, iron-willed human being who still finds a way to doubt herself... At its best, she wills Adrift into a moving story about a natural born wanderer who needs an anchor to know her own strength." Variety's Owen Gleiberman also noted the film's flaws while praising Woodley, writing, "For long passages of Adrift, we're pleasantly engrossed without necessarily being riveted. The courtship, heartfelt as it is, has a glorified YA shimmer; the boat-adrift-at-sea sections are like All Is Lost without the ingenuity. But there's a hook, a surprise, a twist that carries you through."

=== Accolades ===
Year	Association	Category	Recipient(s)	Result	Ref.
2018	Deauville American Film Festival	Rising Star Award	Shailene Woodley	Won	
2018	Teen Choice Awards	Choice Summer Movie Actress	Shailene Woodley	Nominated	
2018	Teen Choice Awards	Choice Summer Movie Actor	Sam Claflin	Nominated	
2018	Teen Choice Awards	Choice Summer Movie	Adrift	Nominated	
2018	People's Choice Awards	Drama Movie Star of 2018	Shailene Woodley	Shortlisted	
2018	People's Choice Awards	Drama Movie of 2018	Adrift	Shortlisted	
2018	21st Annual SCAD Savannah Film Festival	Spotlight Award	Shailene Woodley	Won	

== See also ==
- All Is Lost, a similarly themed 2013 movie.
- Tami Oldham Ashcraft
- Survival film
