= Skint (2013 TV series) =

- Genre: Reality television, Documentary
- Narrated by: Ralph Ineson (2013); Steven Hartley (2014); Steve Speirs (2015)
- Country of origin: United Kingdom
- Original language: English
- No. of series: 3
- No. of episodes: 11

Production
- Production location: Various
- Running time: 60 minutes
- Production company: KEO films

Original release
- Network: Channel 4
- Release: May 13, 2013 – April 27, 2015

Skint is a British documentary series broadcast from 13 May 2013 to 27 April 2015 on Channel 4. It followed members of the general public in various locations who are either unemployed or have very little income as they live their daily lives. The series features many issues in episodes including alcoholism, drugs misuse, long term unemployment and legal matters.

== Episodes ==
All episode ratings are taken from the Broadcasters' Audience Research Board website.

=== Series One (2013) ===
Series One was set in Scunthorpe.

| Episode | Broadcast Date | Total Viewers | | Channel 4 weekly ranking |
| Episode | Broadcast Date | Channel 4 (millions) | Channel 4+1 (000's) | Channel 4 weekly ranking |
|---|---|---|---|---|
| 1 | 13 May 2013 | 3.02 | 741,000 | 1 |
| 2 | 20 May 2013 | 3.17 | 643,000 | 1 |
| 3 | 27 May 2013 | 1.95 | 677,000 | 2 |
| 4 | 3 June 2013 | 2.76 | 536,000 | 1 |

=== Series Two (2014) ===
Series Two was set in Grimsby.

| Episode | Broadcast Date | Total Viewers | | Channel 4 weekly ranking |
| Episode | Broadcast Date | Channel 4 (millions) | Channel 4+1 (000's) | Channel 4 weekly ranking |
|---|---|---|---|---|
| 1 | 24 November 2014 | 1.41 | 412,000 | 11 |
| 2 | 1 December 2014 | 1.11 | 340,000 | 19 |
| 3 | 8 December 2014 | 1.35 | 294,000 | 13 |
| 4 | 15 December 2014 | 1.81 | 243,000 | 7 |

=== Series Three (2015) ===
Series Three was set in Merthyr Tydfil.

| Episode | Broadcast Date | Total Viewers | | Channel 4 weekly ranking |
| Episode | Broadcast Date | Channel 4 (millions) | Channel 4+1 (000's) | Channel 4 weekly ranking |
|---|---|---|---|---|
| 1 | 13 April 2015 | 1.57 | 228,000 | 11 |
| 2 | 20 April 2015 | 1.00 | 310,000 | 18 |
| 3 | 27 April 2015 | 1.49 | 228,000 | 10 |

== Critical reception ==
The Independent reviewed the first series, asking "how do you stop the reporting of the very poor from turning into a condescending voyeurism?" and said some of the scenes "felt unclean to watch".
