= Flatbush =

Neighborhood of Brooklyn in New York City

- Neighborhood of Brooklyn
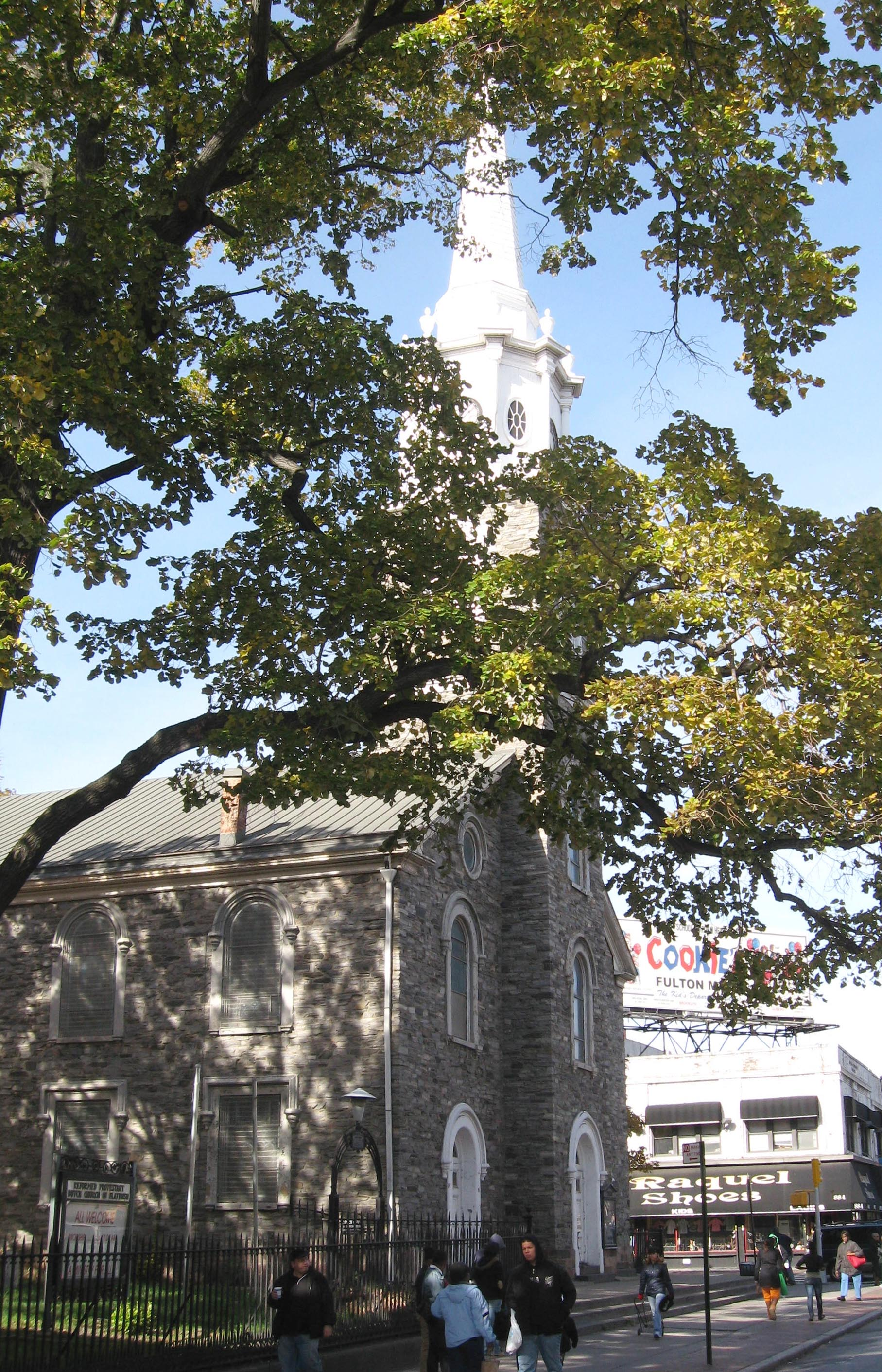
- Reformed Protestant Dutch Church of Flatbush, founded in 1654
- Interactive map of Flatbush
- Coordinates: 40.645°N 73.960°W
- Country: United States
- State: New York
- City: New York City
- Borough: Brooklyn
- Community District: Brooklyn 14
- Founded: 1652
- Founder: Dutch colonists

Area
  - Total: 1.02 sq mi (2.64 km^{2})

Population (2010 United States census)
  - Total: 105,804
  - Density: 104,000/sq mi (40,100/km^{2})
- Time zone: UTC−5 (Eastern)
  - Summer (DST): UTC−4 (EDT)
- ZIP Code: 11226
- Area code: 718, 347, 929, and 917

Flatbush is a neighborhood in the New York City borough of Brooklyn. The neighborhood consists of several subsections in central Brooklyn and is generally bounded by Prospect Park to the north, East Flatbush to the east, Midwood to the south, and Kensington and Parkville to the west. The modern neighborhood includes or borders several institutions of note, including Brooklyn College.

The area was home to the Canarsee people before contact with Europeans; many of the tribe's paths would become important roads through the region. Flatbush was originally chartered as the Dutch Nieuw Nederland colony town of Midwout, also called Vlachte Bos. It was one of the six original European towns on Long Island. The town remained primarily Dutch and rural in character until the latter half of the 19th century, when increasing rail and road connectivity to other parts of New York made it an attractive suburb to Brooklyn and New York City. The town was consolidated into the City of Greater New York in 1898 and was further connected to the rest of the city with the development of the New York City Subway in the early 20th century. Post-World War II, the neighborhood underwent tremendous demographic shifts, becoming home to increasing numbers of immigrants from the Caribbean, Asia, and elsewhere. In the late 20th century and 21st century it has continued to see changes due to gentrification and new immigrants.

Flatbush is part of Brooklyn Community District 14. It is patrolled by the 67th and 70th Precincts of the New York City Police Department. Politically, Flatbush is represented by the New York City Council's 40th and 45th Districts.

== History ==
=== Colonial period ===
In the 16th century, western Long Island was inhabited by the Canarsee people, who called it Sewanhacka. The Canarsee and related Lenape tribes lived semi-nomadic lives, moving seasonally to follow food sources. Their crisscrossing trails through the area formed some of the early roads for the modern region. One of their primary settlements was located roughly at the current intersection of Flatbush Avenue and Kings Highway, named Keskachane or "council fire".

Henry Hudson is reported to have landed on the island in 1609. Hudson was an Englishman working for the Dutch East India Company, and the Dutch established trading posts and settlements in their new colony of Nieuw Nederland thereafter, buying up land from the Canarsee (who did not share the Dutch's view of property rights, viewing the sales not as final but essentially leases.) One of the Dutch settlements was Midwout (alternatively Midwoud or Medwoud,) Dutch for "middle wood". Midwout was established inland, in a forested area bounded by hills to the north and flat open spaces to the south, which had been managed by the natives for cultivation and game purposes. The geography was created by the ancient glacier that once covered the area, leaving behind as it retreated the hills of the terminal moraine and a large outwash plain beyond. Midwout was settled between 1630 and 1636, and received a patent of township by 1652. (Note: The exact dates for Flatbush's settlement are unclear. Reverend Thomas M. Strong, in his 1842 history of Flatbush, cites the earliest known land deeds for lands lying in Flatbush and nearby Flatlands as June 6, 1636, but concludes "it is not improbable, however, that considerable settlements were made before any formal grants or Patents of lands were obtained." The original patents for Flatbush's township were lost.) In the following years it would also be known as Vlachte Bos or Flackebos ("wooded plain"), and the various names and spellings of the town were used interchangeably for nearly a century.

A church was built in 1654, replaced by another structure in 1698. The early settlement was enclosed by a palisade wall for protection. By 1658, it was the location of the courts and seat of Justice for the county. There were records of schoolmasters in the town from 1659. The north end of Midwout was called Steenraap, the main business center the Dorp, and the south end Rustenburgh or resting-place. Among the early colonists in Midwout who would rise to prominence was Leffert Pietersen Van Haughwout. Van Haughwout's family, later known as the Lefferts, would build a homestead in the 1680s in the north of town, now part of Prospect Lefferts Gardens. Other Dutch families would ultimately lend their names to the streets of the modern city. In its early years, Midwout came into conflict with its neighboring town of New Amersfoort over its borders, as well as with the local natives; in 1670 the Rockaway Indians challenged the Dutch claims, saying the Canarsee had no authority to sell the land. Midwout's leadership bought the land again to avoid trouble. By the end of the century most of the natives in the region were either dead by war or disease, or dispossessed of their ancestral lands; a few remained in Midwout as farmhands or servants for the Dutch.

In 1664, the English captured nearby New Amsterdam, and New Netherland was ceded to the English, remaining permanently in their hands after 1674 as New York. The towns of Long Island were united as Kings County in 1683. The borders of Midwout were fixed in 1685 in a new charter granted by Thomas Dongan, the English governor of New York province. The English "Flatbush" gradually supplanted the Dutch names for the town. The Dutch character of Flatbush remained despite the English takeover; Dutch landowners continued to exert political control, and Dutch remained the dominant language until the latter part of the 18th century. Marriage outside of Dutch social circles was discouraged, which helped retain Dutch culture and kept the inhabitants "clannish", in the words of one historian.

Early Dutch settlement of the area had focused on farming, which proved lucrative as nearby New York City grew. The need for labor spurred the importation of African slaves, making New York one of the largest slaveholding regions in the northern English colonies. Dutch slavery was less rigid and repressive than that of the Southern Colonies, but as the English assumed control of the region, harsher legal codes came into effect. The slave population swelled through the 18th century. In 1738, 29% of Flatbush's recorded population of 539 were slaves, jumping to 41% by 1790. The enslaved labor pool was also supplemented by indentured servants from the British Isles or Germany.

During the American Revolution (1775–1783), Flatbush demonstrated conflicting loyalties to either the loyalist or patriot causes. Patriot troops burned houses and farmland early in war to deny the British the resources. Landowners in Brooklyn were concerned that a full conflict between the Colonies and the British would result in loss of their critical source of slave labor. Parts of the Battle of Long Island took place in Flatbush; the patriots checked the British advance north at what is now known as Battle Pass, until they were surprised by a flanking attack. The town of Flatbush was occupied by the British for seven years, with British troops and American prisoners of war billeted in area homes. Some Flatbush residents maintained their loyalist sympathies: the King's Arms, for example, appeared in the town's inn for a half-century after the conclusion of the conflict.

For several decades after the Revolution, New York merchants and farmers continued to engage in the slave trade. The Gradual Emancipation Law of 1799 emancipated people of African descent born after July 4, 1799. Men and women escaping enslavement often went to Manhattan, where they could live within the community of free blacks. Slavery was fully abolished in 1827, though many former slaves continued to work as sharecroppers under their former owners.

=== 19th century ===
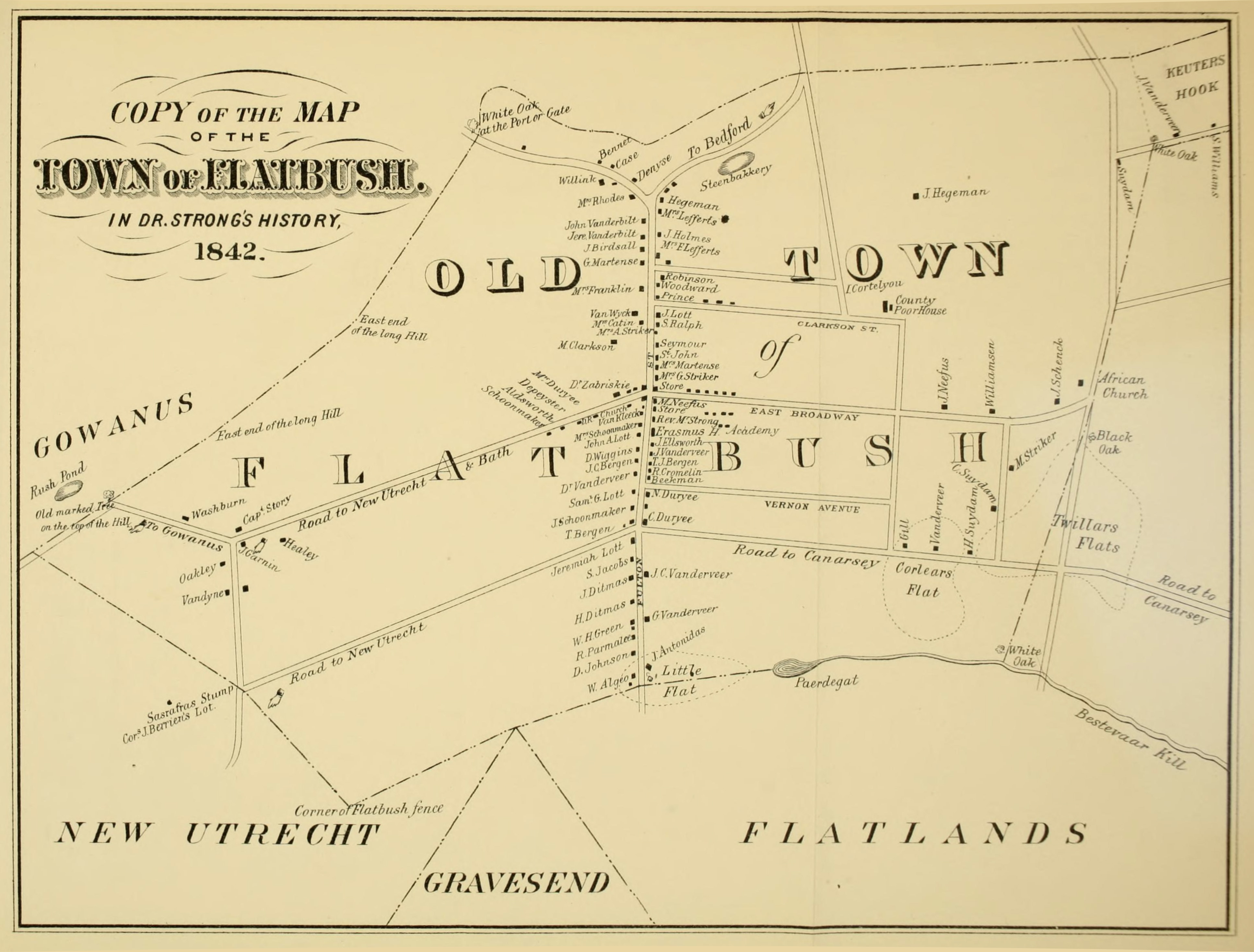
Flatbush Old Town in 1842. The triangular intersection at the edge of the town is roughly at the current-day intersection of Flatbush Avenue and East New York Avenue.

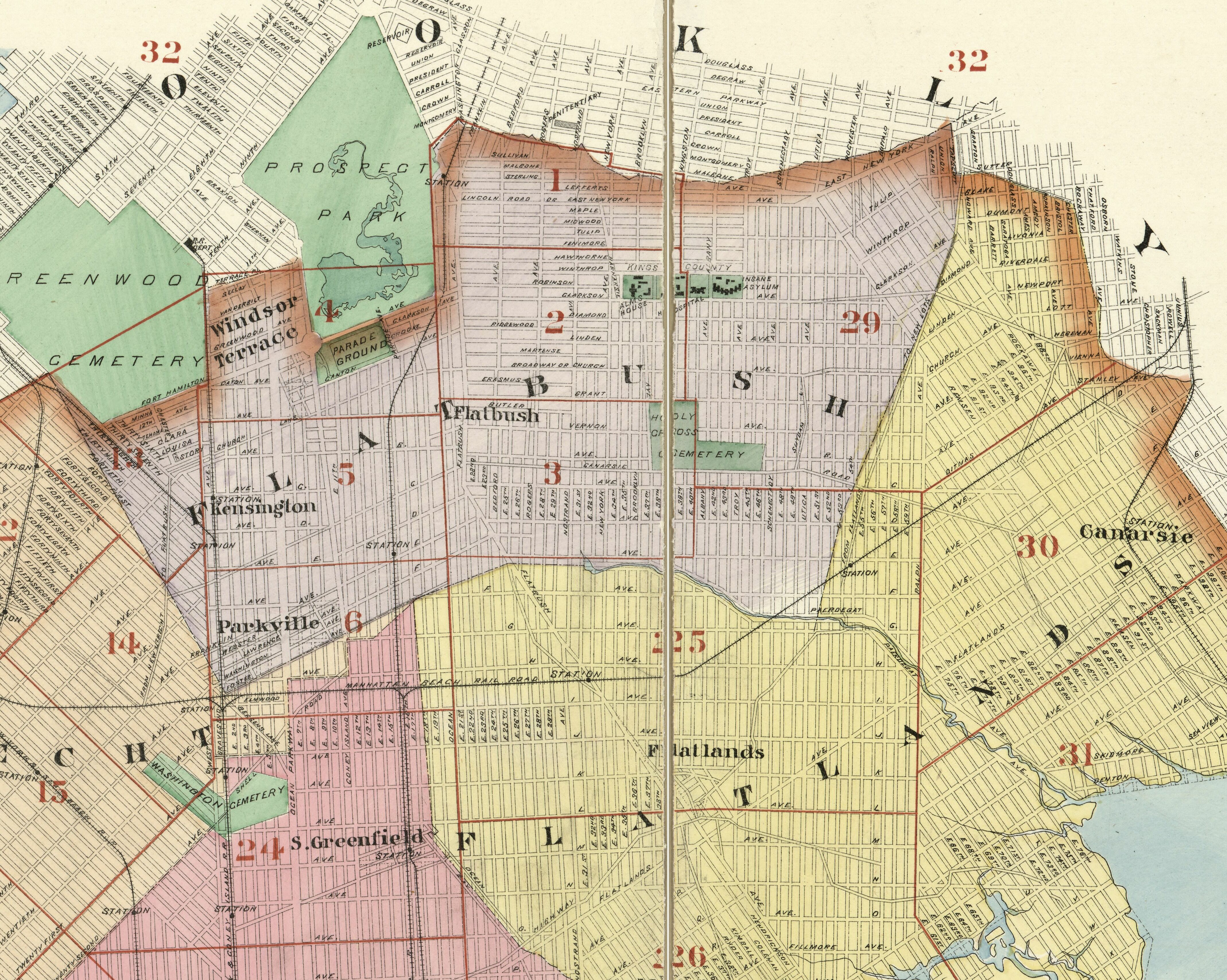
Flatbush and surrounding Kings County in 1890, shortly before it was annexed into Brooklyn to the north. The irregular Flatbush streets have been replaced with a street grid; its borders have been encroached upon by Green-Wood Cemetery and Prospect Park.

Into the 19th century, Flatbush remained a slow-growing farming community. The opening of the Erie Canal shifted cultivation away from grains and towards market produce, with Kings County being the second-largest provider of produce in the country until the end of the century after Queens County. It remained isolated from the growing Brooklyn by open country. Prospect Park was developed from land partially in Flatbush, though it was wholly claimed by Brooklyn. The rural character of the town, however, would not last. In the second quarter of the century, a street grid was laid out, and the main north–south road was established as Flatbush Avenue. A stream of Irish and some German immigrants arrived in the area, comprising the majority of the rural labor force by 1860. Though Flatbush and Kings County did not support Abraham Lincoln's presidency in 1860, after the American Civil War broke out, Flatbush residents raised funds and soldiers for the war effort. Blacks fleeing the violence of the New York City draft riots found refuge in Flatbush and nearby Weeksville.

Flatbush built a Town Hall in 1875, a few years after Flatbush and the other towns of Kings County avoided annexation by Brooklyn. The Brooklyn, Flatbush and Coney Island Railway, established 1878, connected Flatbush to the pleasure spots at Coney Island and the Atlantic Coast to the south, and downtown Brooklyn and Manhattan to the north. The railways and the opening of bridges connecting Brooklyn to Manhattan began transforming Flatbush into a suburb. Towards the end of the century, the land was worth more if used for real estate than farming, and large landowners began selling off plots. John Lefferts divided his family's Flatbush homestead into 516 parcels, restricted by covenant to only be developed into single-family housing. These formed Lefferts Manor, containing possibly the neighborhood's earliest row houses. Another early development was Vanderveer Park, formed from 65 acres of the Vanderveer family's holdings. Like Lefferts Manor, Vanderveer Park traded on the Dutch history of the region to attract buyers. The developers of the new housing pitched Flatbush as a country oasis offering respite from the "cliff-dwelling" vertical living of Manhattan. Much of the development focused on the areas immediately south and east of Prospect Park, with the farther-flung areas remaining mostly rural and dotted with wood-framed houses.

Amid the construction of houses and the infrastructure to support them, Flatbush's population tripled in the decades before 1900. In the face of increasing urbanization, some community leaders wished for Flatbush and the outlying Kings County towns to retain their rural character. Resident and amateur historian Gertrude Lefferts Vanderbilt, writing in 1881, correctly predicted a coming merger with Brooklyn, and lamented that the Dutch character of the town was gone. The only remaining signs of its presence to her were "the reminiscences and traditions, while the old family names mark the localities still, as the projecting peaks mark the submerged rock."

In 1894, Flatbush was successfully annexed into Brooklyn. A reception hosting Brooklyn mayor Charles A. Schieren was held at the Midwood Club House, where Schieren called the former town "the prettiest and most fascinating suburban village of Kings County." Brooklyn itself was merged into New York City in 1898, a move opposed by many in Brooklyn and passed by just 277 votes.

=== 20th century ===
In the early 20th century, Flatbush changed even more rapidly as further transit improvements spurred additional development. The course of the Brooklyn, Flatbush & Coney Island Railroad (now called the Brooklyn & Brighton Beach Railroad) was electrified in 1901 and run over the Brooklyn Bridge, connecting Flatbush more directly with lower Manhattan. This was followed by further improvements to the line in the subsequent years, including the addition of more tracks and removal of at-grade crossings. The railways lived alongside five trolley lines that ran to Williamsburg in north Brooklyn and the Lower East Side in Manhattan. Development of the north end of Flatbush was helped along with the construction of Ebbets Field, home of the Brooklyn Dodgers baseball team.

Construction across Brooklyn slowed as Europe and then America became embroiled in World War I; the cost of construction spiked, and the city emerged from the war years having gone from a surplus of housing a decade earlier to a dire shortage. The response from the government was a slew of housing and tenant bills, with one allowing the city to exempt new residential construction from property taxes until 1932. The ordinance spurred a housing boom across the borough, with significant development in the much cheaper land of southern Brooklyn and Flatbush, which was increasingly connected to the rest of the city via new infrastructure projects. Extant homes—including the neighborhood's earliest suburban development—were converted to multifamily dwellings or demolished for new homes or apartments, which came in an array of architectural styles. Alongside the residential construction came commercial developments, from movie palaces like the Loew's Kings Theatre to department stores like Sears Roebuck & Company. An entertainment and commercial district developed in the vicinity of Church and Flatbush Avenues, with another developing at the intersection of Flatbush, Avenue H, and Nostrand Avenue, known as the Junction.

As six-story Art Deco and Colonial Revival elevator apartment houses alongside stylistically analogous walk-ups were developed on Ocean Avenue and throughout its periphery, Flatbush nurtured a socioeconomically diverse population of Irish Americans, Italian Americans and American Jews; according to anthropologist Ansley Hamid, occupants ranged from "merchants [and] professionals" to "skilled [and] manual laborers." By 1930, one-third of Flatbush's residents were Jewish. The new residents ultimately displaced the remaining Anglo-Dutch, who decamped to farther-off suburbs in Long Island or New Jersey.

By the Great Depression, Flatbush had a population of 400,000, and boasted fifteen theaters, rail and trolly lines, dozens of schools, fifty-four churches, and five newspapers. New York greatly benefited from New Deal policies and funds, which helped build Brooklyn College in 1935. During World War II the "soldier from Flatbush" became a symbol of the All-American soldier.

After the war, Flatbush saw demographic shifts along with the rest of the city. Owners and renters from the interwar years aged, and their children moved out of the neighborhood; from 1950 to 1960 children under six in Flatbush dropped 14 percent, while the number of seniors over 65 rose 42 percent. The Dodgers left Brooklyn, and Ebbets Field was torn down. In the 1960s, poorer African Americans and Puerto Ricans began moving into the corridor along Nostrand Avenue, where the subway offered access to job opportunities, while middle-class African Americans bought up row houses to the west. Blockbusting encouraged white residents to sell and leave the neighborhood, and properties fell into disrepair while crime increased. The population of the neighborhood shifted from 89% white in 1970 to 30% white in a decade. The white and Jewish residents were replaced by Hispanic, Asian, and black ones, and the commercial properties shifted to reflect the change. Afro-Caribbean immigrants joined African Americans in moving from traditional neighborhoods like Harlem to Flatbush, particularly Haitians fleeing the dictatorial rule of François and Jean-Claude Duvalier. One resident who moved to the area in 1971 recalled that his building gradually shed staff and maintenance was neglected as the decade wore on, amid a wider drop in city services following the city's financial crisis.

Parts of the neighborhood in the west and to the south of Prospect Park continued to attract a sizable number of wealthier homeowners, and doctors still resided and practiced on a stretch of Parkside Avenue immediately adjacent to Prospect Park. By the mid-1980s, however, the neighborhood had numerous abandoned or semi-abandoned buildings, many of which had fallen into a state of disrepair. The eastern parts of Flatbush were particularly affected. Crime worsened significantly during the 1970s and 80s, alongside a rise in drugs. A number of stores on Flatbush and Church Avenues fell victim to looting during the 1977 blackout.

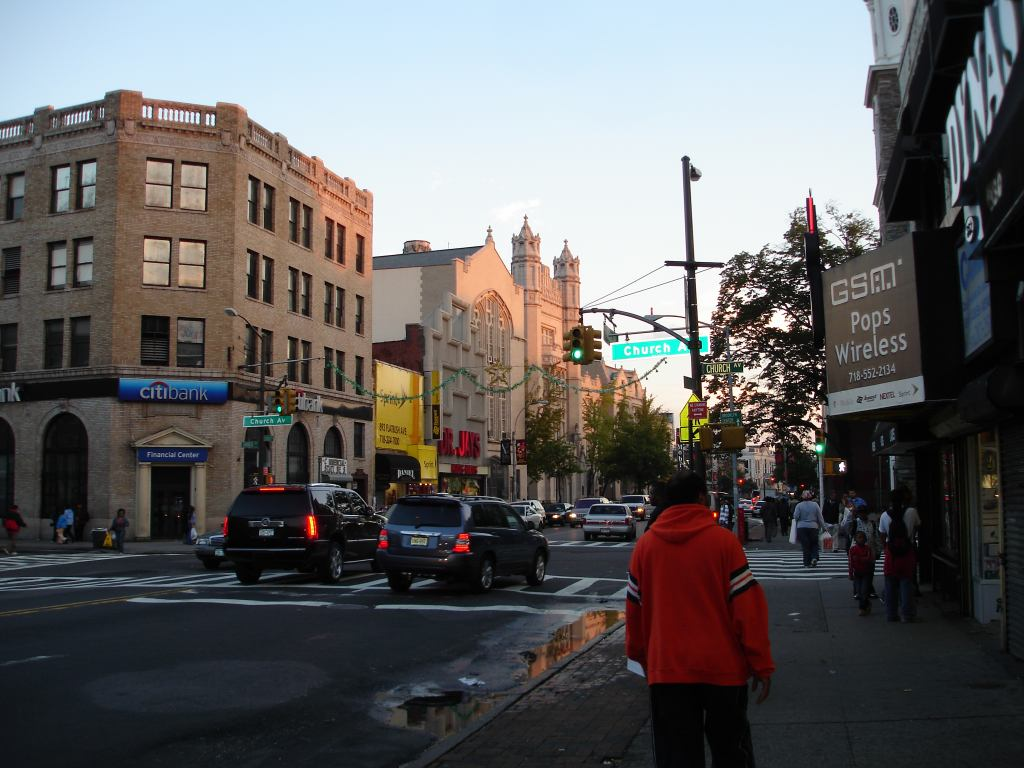
Church and Flatbush, 2013

Tenants rights organizations and neighborhood associations formed to fight back against the neighborhood's decay. The Flatbush Development Corporation, one of a number of community development corporations that formed in poorer areas of the country starting in the late 1960s, sought to revitalize the community. The FDC investigated bad landlords and agitated for loans to developers willing to refurbish old buildings. Other groups worked to protect threatened buildings and neighborhoods as historic landmarks. In the 1980s, families and young couples priced out of areas like Park Slope and looking for cheaper real estate moved into the homes in the historic areas. Residents started buying their houses and forming block associations; the high percentage of buyers who were middle-class black residents made it atypical from other gentrification waves on the time in the city that displaced the current residents. Owners in the Prospect Park South neighborhood hired private security to patrol the neighborhood. Residents lobbied commercial business to return to the area. Local merchants, the city, and the Flatbush Development Corporation worked to revitalize the neighborhood's commercial core. The Flatbush Avenue Business Improvement District was founded in 1990, and by 1996 included 195 merchants on the stretch of road between Parkside Avenue and Cortelyou Road.

=== 21st century ===
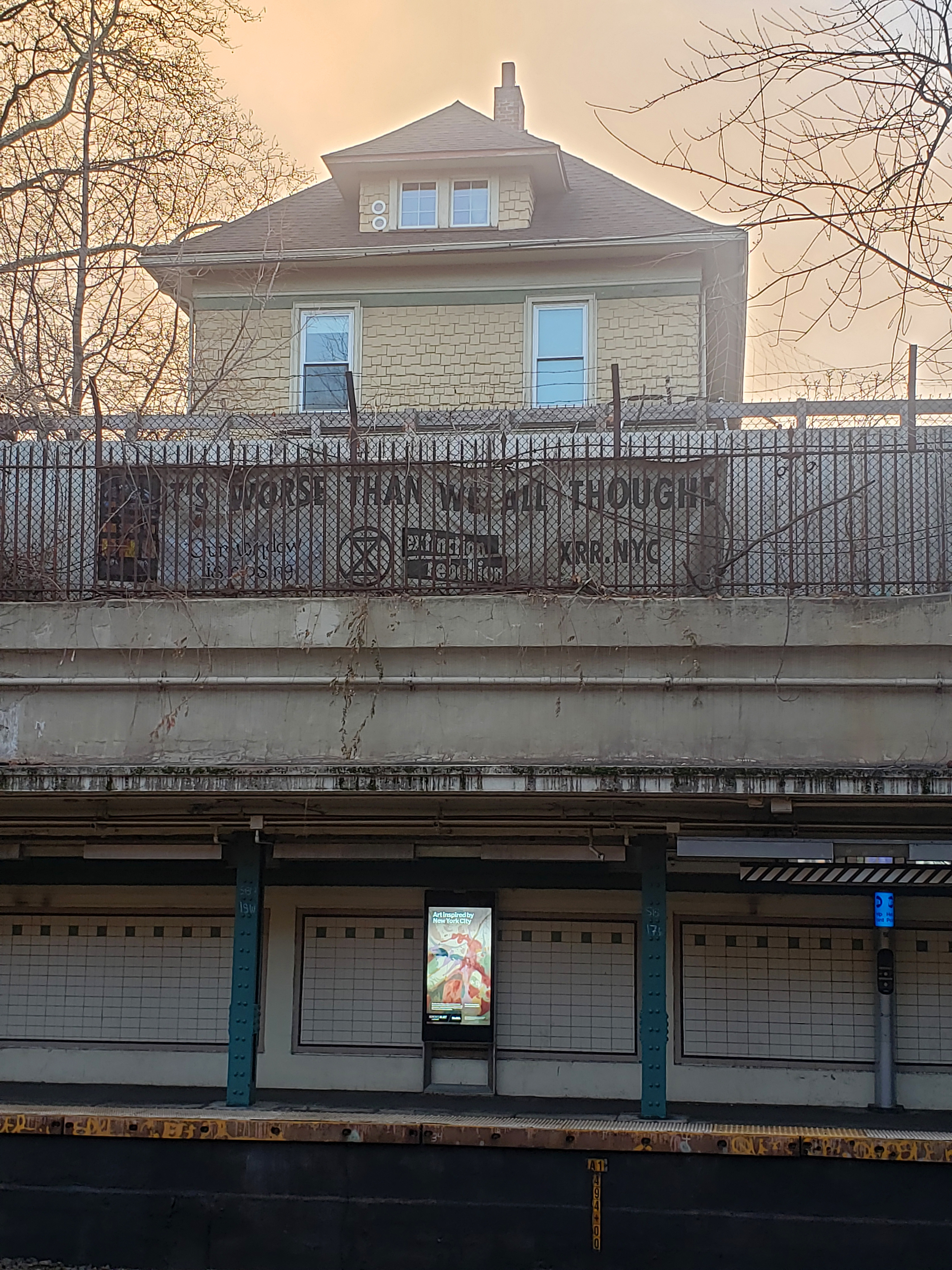
View of residential house with Extinction Rebellion banner at Beverly Road Station in Flatbush

In the 2000s, Flatbush began to shed its poor reputation, and residents came to the area for its cheaper prices, attractive housing stock, and retail. The Junction was redeveloped with the addition of Target Corporation's largest-ever store. The demographics of the neighborhood continued to shift; new Jewish residents from Syria arrived alongside Pakistanis, Bangladeshis, Russians, and Chinese. The Muslim community was hit hard in the aftermath of the September 11, 2001 terrorist attacks; an estimated 20,000 residents left voluntarily or otherwise after immigration crackdowns. Recognizing the changed makeup of the eastern part of the neighborhood, the city designated two areas "Little Caribbean" and "Little Haiti" in 2017 and 2018, respectively. Little Haiti is bounded by Church and Brooklyn Avenues to the west, East 16th Street to the north, Avenue H and Parkside Avenue to the south, and East 16th Street to the east.

The Times featured the neighborhood in 2016 as one of four in the city where real estate was expected to take off, as buyers looked for more affordable options. Flatbush was disparately impacted by the COVID-19 pandemic compared to higher-income parts of the city. As housing prices have increased, the neighborhood's predominantly black population has begun to shrink.

The neighborhood continues to face issues as a lower-income neighborhood compared to the city, with a 2016 WNYC reporting finding the neighborhood was disproportionately the target of Vision Zero traffic safety enforcement compared to whiter neighborhoods like Williamsburg and Greenpoint. A 2023 Gothamist analysis of 311 data revealed the neighborhood was one of the largest problem areas in the city for illegal waste dumping.

Little remains of the original Flatbush village and its surroundings. The 18th-century Lefferts family house, which resided in Flatbush, was moved in 1918 from its original location to Prospect Park along Flatbush Avenue. Near the Lefferts house is a former toll booth from the 19th century that once sat along the Flatbush Turnpike leading to Brooklyn. Other historic houses nearby include the Wyckoff-Bennett Homestead, built 1766, and the Wyckoff House, built on Twiller's Flats. A marker in Prospect Park marks the site of Battle Pass. The Flatbush Reformed Dutch Church remains at the historic center of Flatbush at Church and Flatbush Avenues.

== Geographic boundaries ==
When Flatbush merged with Brooklyn, the old town became coterminous with the 29th ward. There are no official boundaries for the modern neighborhood, (Note: New York City deliberately does not have official neighborhood borders, with a spokesperson for the city's planning department saying in 2023 that the city leaves the delineation "up to New Yorkers themselves.") which is smaller than the old boundaries of the town, and have long been disputed. In 1928, the Brooklyn Standard Union gave an expansive definition of Flatbush as running from Ocean Parkway in the west to Schenectady Avenue in the east, and from Prospect Park in the north as far south as Sheepshead Bay. By the 1960s, the northern region of the neighborhood was now considered part of Crown Heights instead. 1980s New York Times articles, following the definition of the Flatbush Development Corporation, outlined the narrow boundaries as Parkside Avenue to the north, Bedford Avenue to the east, Avenue H to the south, and Coney Island Avenue to the west. However they also noted that some residents still considered Midwood part of Flatbush, and the historic definitions had it stretch from Ocean Parkway to New York Avenue. By the 2000s, the Times had shifted the boundaries eastward, with New York Avenue the eastern border and Ocean Avenue the western one; the paper also noted that the area is one with fuzzier boundaries, compared to neighborhoods with sharp, widely-agreed-upon delineations. The borders roughly coincide with Brooklyn Community District 14, which also includes portions of Midwood and Kensington.

Over time, neighborhoods once considered part of Flatbush have gained their own distinct identities. This includes Prospect Lefferts Gardens, and also the various planned communities of Victorian Flatbush: Prospect Park South, the Beverley Squares (Beverley Square East and Beverley Square West), Ditmas Park, Fiske Terrace,, and Albemarle-Kenmore Terrace. Bordering Flatbush on the north is Crown Heights, to the east is East Flatbush, to the west is Kensington and Parkville, and to the south is Midwood.

=== Fiske Terrace ===
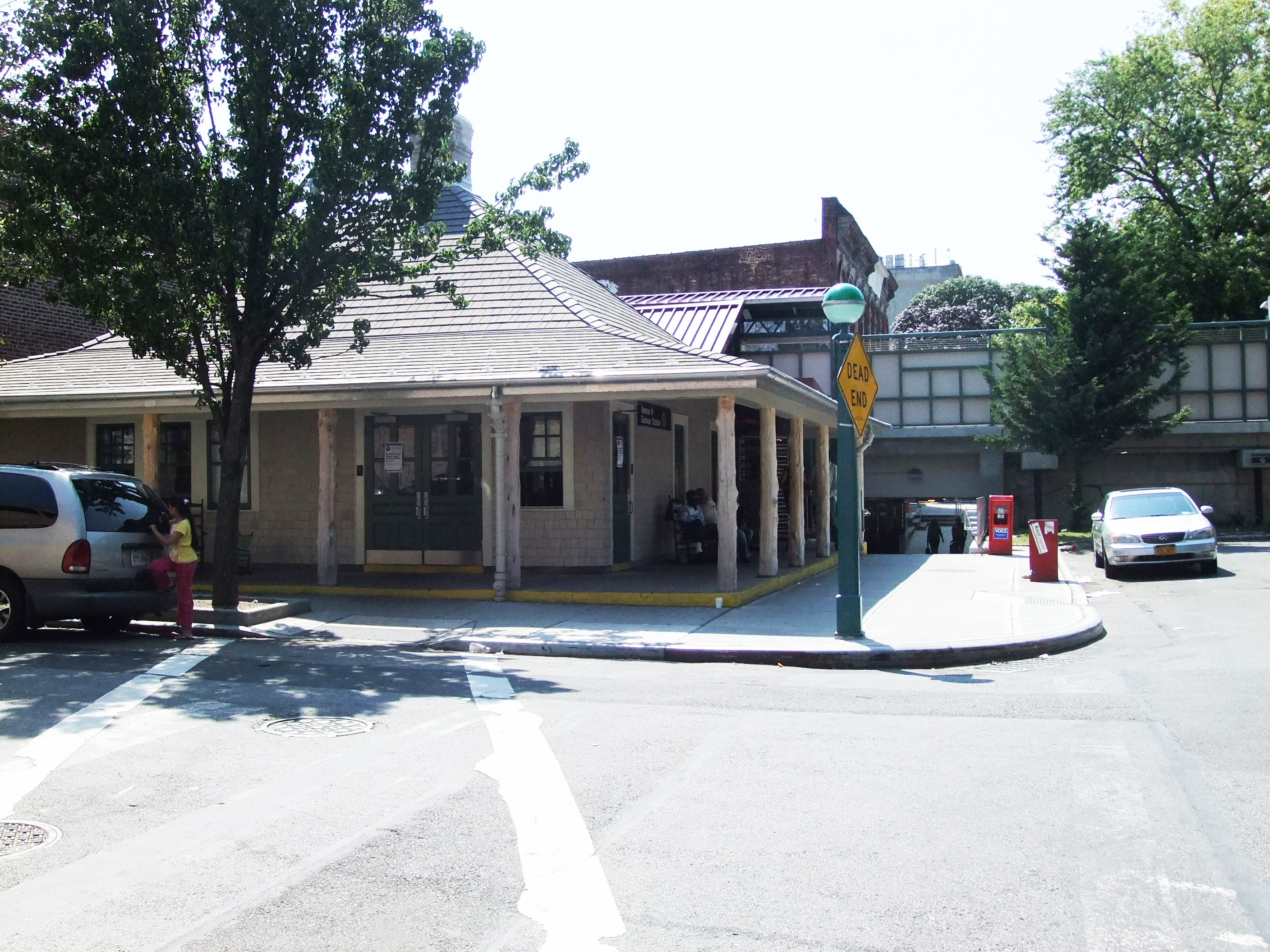
Avenue H station house

Fiske Terrace (40°37′45″N 73°57′40″W) is a planned community and neighborhood on the southern edge of Flatbush and north of Midwood. It is bounded by Foster Avenue on the north, Ocean Avenue on the east, the Bay Ridge Branch of the Long Island Rail Road/New York and Atlantic Railway right-of-way on the south, and the New York City Subway BMT Brighton Line subway line (B and Q trains) on the west. Fiske Terrace was developed, along with Midwood Park, with individually designed housing by the T.B. Ackerson Company in 1905; after the T. B. Ackerson Company bought what was then a forest, it was razed within 18 months, giving way to about 150 custom-made houses as well as streets and utilities, and the Midwood Malls. Prominent past residents included Richard Hellmann, creator and founder of "Hellmann's Mayonnaise", and Charles Ebbets, owner of Ebbets Field Baseball Stadium and the Brooklyn Dodgers. On March 18, 2008, the New York City Landmarks Preservation Commission unanimously approved designation of the Fiske Terrace-Midwood Park Historic District. 250 homes were designated. The community is served by the Avenue H (formerly Fiske Terrace) station of the BMT Brighton Line, whose century-old station house is a New York City designated landmark.

== Landmarks ==
An aerial view of Ebbets Field

Well-known institutions within Flatbush include Erasmus Hall High School, the Parade Ground, the Flatbush Dutch Reformed Church, and Brooklyn College. The Kings Theatre, listed on the National Register of Historic Places, operated from 1929 to 1977; it reopened as a live show venue in February 2015 after extensive renovations.

== Demographics ==
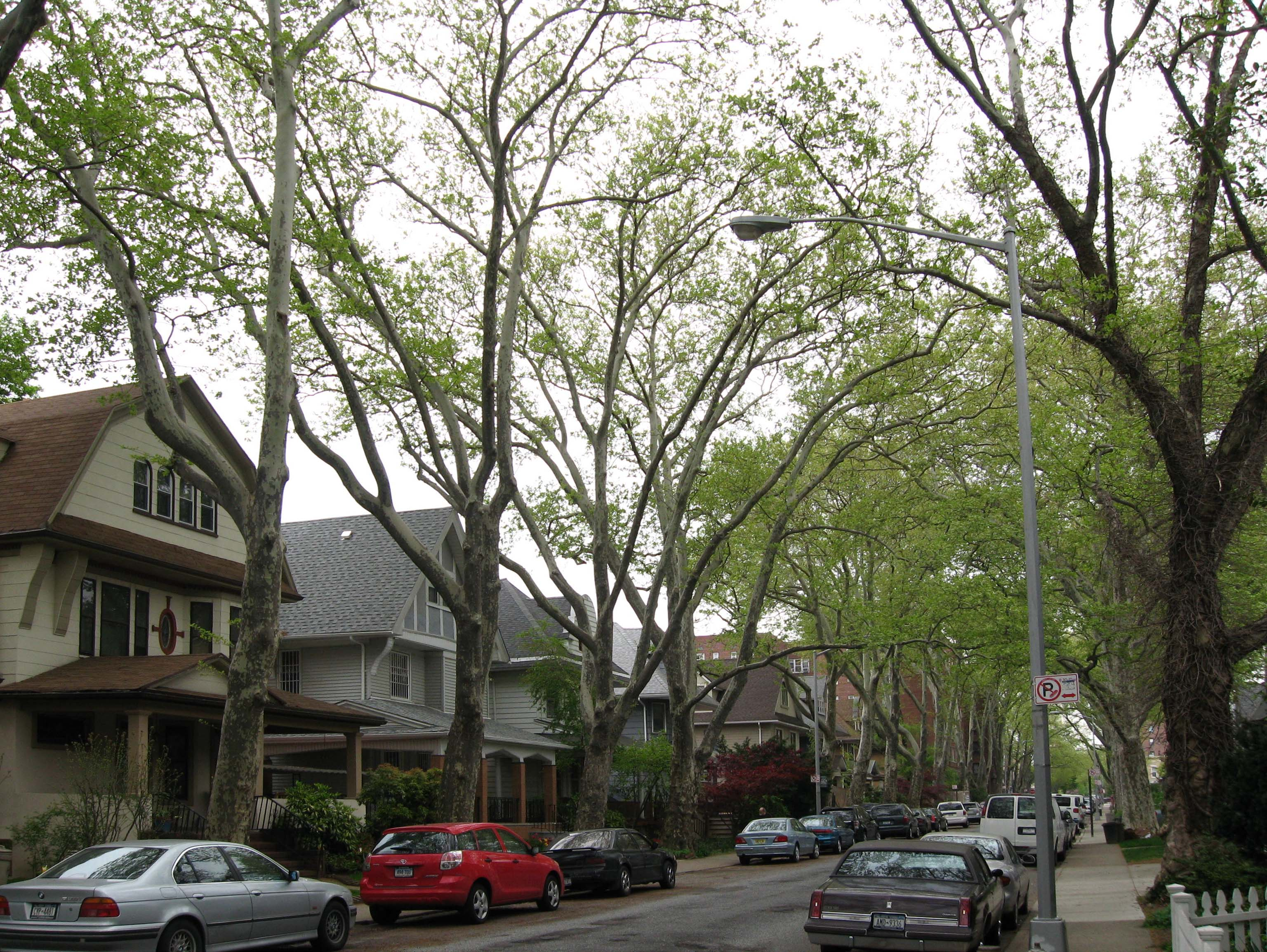
Victorian Flatbush, at Ditmas Avenue east of Coney Island Avenue

Based on data from the 2010 United States census, the population of Flatbush was 105,804, a decrease of 5,071 (4.6%) from the 110,875 counted in 2000. Covering an area of 1,038.56 acres (420.29 ha), the neighborhood had a population density of 101.9 inhabitants per acre (65,200/sq mi; 25,200/km^{2}).

The racial makeup of the neighborhood was 19.9% (21,030) White, 48.6% (51,470) African American, 0.3% (281) Native American, 9.2% (9,712) Asian, 0.0% (26) Pacific Islander, 0.5% (575) from other races, and 1.9% (2,051) from two or more races. Hispanic or Latino of any race were 19.5% (20,659) of the population.

The entirety of Community Board 14, which comprises Flatbush and Midwood, had 165,543 inhabitants as of NYC Health's 2018 Community Health Profile, with an average life expectancy of 82.4 years. This is slightly higher than the median life expectancy of 81.2 for all New York City neighborhoods. Most inhabitants are middle-aged adults and youth: 25% are between the ages of 0–17, 29% between 25 and 44, and 24% between 45 and 64. The ratio of college-aged and elderly residents was lower, at 9% and 13% respectively.

As of 2016, the median household income in Community Board 14 was $56,599. In 2018, an estimated 22% of Flatbush and Midwood residents lived in poverty, compared to 21% in all of Brooklyn and 20% in all of New York City. One in eleven residents (9%) were unemployed, compared to 9% in the rest of both Brooklyn and New York City. Rent burden, or the percentage of residents who have difficulty paying their rent, is 57% in Flatbush and Midwood, higher than the citywide and boroughwide rates of 52% and 51% respectively.

As according to the 2020 census data from New York City Department of City Planning showed a diverse racial population, though the concentrations of each racial groups varied between different sections of Flatbush. Western portions of the community had between 10,000 and 19,999 White residents, 5,000 to 9,999 Black residents, and each the Hispanic and Asian populations were between 5,000 and 9,999 residents. Eastern portions of the community had between 30,000 and 39,999 Black residents, 10,000 to 19,999 Hispanic residents, and 5,000 to 9,999 White residents.

== Community organizations ==
The bustling business district and neighborhoods of Flatbush are supported by several community organizations. The Flatbush Avenue Business Improvement District provides services to keep Flatbush Avenue from Parkside Avenue to Cortelyou Road clean, safe and profitable for its businesses. Every year, the Flatbush BID organizes the Flatbush Avenue Street Fair, an event that celebrates the cultures of the community. The Flatbush Development Corporation hosts events and programs that are aimed to support the "vitality, diversity and quality of life" in the Flatbush community. CAMBA, Inc. is a Flatbush-based nonprofit that since 1977 has provided housing, youth education and development, legal services and healthcare services to residents of Flatbush and beyond. Flatbush Cats, a nonprofit trap-and-neuter rescue organization, has a large social media following.

== Police and fire ==
Flatbush is covered by two precincts of the NYPD. The 70th Precinct is located at 154 Lawrence Avenue in Parkville and serves Ditmas Park, Prospect Park South, and Midwood, while the 67th Precinct is located at 2820 Snyder Avenue and serves East Flatbush. The 70th Precinct ranked 30th safest out of 69 patrol areas for per-capita crime in 2010, while the 67th Precinct ranked 40th safest. As of 2018, with a non-fatal assault rate of 42 per 100,000 people, Flatbush and Midwood's rate of violent crimes per capita is less than that of the city as a whole. The incarceration rate of 372 per 100,000 people is lower than that of the city as a whole.

The 70th Precinct has a lower crime rate than in the 1990s, with crimes across all categories having decreased by 89.1% between 1990 and 2018. The precinct reported 6 murders, 27 rapes, 162 robberies, 273 felony assaults, 173 burglaries, 527 grand larcenies, and 75 grand larcenies auto in 2018. The 67th Precinct also has a lower crime rate than in the 1990s, with crimes across all categories having decreased by 79.9% between 1990 and 2018. The precinct reported 6 murders, 43 rapes, 246 robberies, 601 felony assaults, 225 burglaries, 586 grand larcenies, and 98 grand larcenies auto in 2018.

In 1997, officers from the 70th Precinct restrained and sexually assaulted innocent suspect Abner Louima in the precinct's restroom. Louima received a settlement from the city of $8.7 million, at that time the largest individual payment for an NYPD brutality case. Approximately $1.6 million of the settlement money came from the police union, which allegedly tried to help cover up the crime.

Flatbush is served by three New York City Fire Department (FDNY) fire stations:

- Engine Co. 255/Ladder Co. 157 — 1367 Rogers Avenue
- Engine Co. 281/Ladder Co. 147 – 1210 Cortelyou Road
- Engine Co. 248/Battalion 41 – 2900 Snyder Avenue

== Health ==
As of 2018, preterm births are more common in Flatbush and Midwood than in other places citywide, though births to teenage mothers are less common. In Flatbush and Midwood, there were 99 preterm births per 1,000 live births (compared to 87 per 1,000 citywide), and 17.1 births to teenage mothers per 1,000 live births (compared to 19.3 per 1,000 citywide). Flatbush and Midwood has a relatively high population of residents who are uninsured, or who receive healthcare through Medicaid. In 2018, this population of uninsured residents was estimated to be 16%, which is higher than the citywide rate of 12%.

The concentration of fine particulate matter, the deadliest type of air pollutant, in Flatbush and Midwood is 0.0077 milligrams per cubic metre (7.7×10^{−9} oz/ft^{3}), lower than the citywide and boroughwide averages. Ten percent of Flatbush and Midwood residents are smokers, which is slightly lower than the city average of 14% of residents being smokers. In Flatbush and Midwood, 28% of residents are obese, 13% are diabetic, and 31% have high blood pressure—compared to the citywide averages of 24%, 11%, and 28% respectively. In addition, 21% of children are obese, compared to the citywide average of 20%.

Eighty percent of residents eat some fruits and vegetables every day, which is lower than the city's average of 87%. In 2018, 77% of residents described their health as "good", "very good", or "excellent", slightly less than the city's average of 78%. For every supermarket in Flatbush and Midwood, there are 21 bodegas.

Major hospitals in close proximity to Flatbush include Kings County Hospital and SUNY Downstate Medical Center. The facilities are located in neighboring East Flatbush just east of New York Avenue.

== Government and education ==
Flatbush is covered by ZIP Codes 11203, 11210, 11225, and 11226.

Flatbush and Midwood generally has a similar ratio of college-educated residents to the rest of the city as of 2018. Though 43% of residents age 25 and older have a college education or higher, 18% have less than a high school education and 39% are high school graduates or have some college education. By contrast, 40% of Brooklynites and 38% of city residents have a college education or higher. The percentage of Flatbush and Midwood students excelling in math rose from 43 percent in 2000 to 68 percent in 2011, though reading achievement remained steady at 48% during the same time period.

Flatbush and Midwood's rate of elementary school student absenteeism is about equal to the rest of New York City. In Flatbush and Midwood, 18% of elementary school students missed twenty or more days per school year, compared to the citywide average of 20% of students. Additionally, 75% of high school students in Flatbush and Midwood graduate on time, equal to the citywide average of 75% of students.

Flatbush is home to a number of elementary and intermediate schools, as well as the Erasmus Hall High School campus. Founded in 1786, it has a long list of famous alumni. Its building has been expanded numerous times, and is notable for its relatively unique architecture. Since 1994, the building has been divided internally into five smaller high schools, each concentrating on a different academic area.

Brooklyn College (one of the four-year colleges in the City University of New York system) occupies a 35-acre (14 ha) campus shared between the neighborhoods of Flatbush and Midwood.

Several Jewish yeshivas are in the neighborhood, including the Mir Yeshiva, Yeshiva Rabbi Chaim Berlin, Yeshiva Torah Vodaas, Yeshiva Torah Temimah, Yeshiva Tiferes Yisroel, and the Yeshivah of Flatbush. Combined, they form a major center of Jewish learning. The area had an estimated total enrollment of 14,500 students in 2004.

=== Libraries ===
The Brooklyn Public Library (BPL) has three branches in Flatbush. The Flatbush branch is located at 22 Linden Boulevard east of Flatbush Avenue. It was built in 1905 as a Carnegie library branch. The Clarendon branch is located at 2035 Nostrand Avenue south of Farragut Road. It was founded as a deposit station with a small circulating collection in 1913. The branch moved into its current building in 1954, and it was renovated in 1990. The Crown Heights branch, located on the border with Crown Heights, is located at 560 New York Avenue near Maple Street.

== Transportation ==
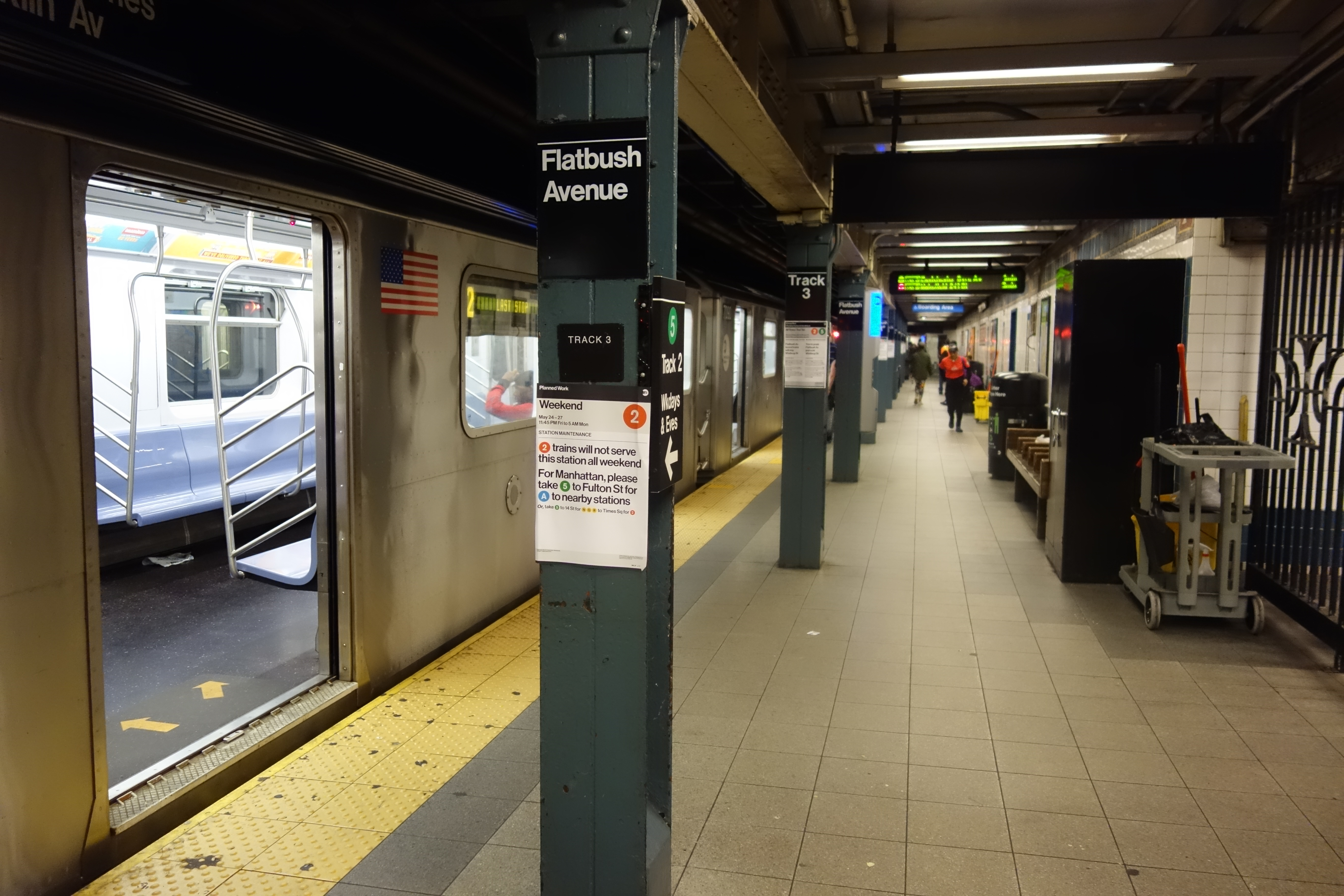
Flatbush Avenue station

Flatbush is served by the BMT Brighton Line (B and Q trains) and IRT Nostrand Avenue Line (2 and 5 trains) on the New York City Subway. The Junction is the location of the Nostrand Avenue Line's termination at Flatbush Avenue–Brooklyn College station.

The B6, B8, B11, B12, B16, B35, B41, B44 and B49 are MTA Regional Bus Operations routes that serve the neighborhood; some of them also have limited-stop variants, and the B44 also has a Select Bus Service variant. In addition, the B103, a wholly limited-stop bus, runs through Flatbush, while the Q35 makes limited stops in Brooklyn, connecting Flatbush with the Rockaways. Additionally, the BM1, BM2, BM3 and BM4 express buses serve Flatbush.

The major roadways through Flatbush include Flatbush Avenue, Nostrand Avenue and Ocean Avenue, which are north–south corridors, and Linden Boulevard, Church Avenue and Caton Avenue, which are east–west corridors.

== In popular culture ==
- Flatbush is mentioned in The Lords of Flatbush, a 1974 film set in 1958. The Lords of Flatbush title was later used by local gothic metal band Type O Negative.
- The neighborhood is featured in ABC's 1976 unaired except for its pilot episode sitcom, Flatbush Avenue J, based somewhat on the 1974 dramedy movie, The Lords of Flatbush, only with its titular former 1950s teenagers now mid 1970s adults in their 30's, some of whom having moved away while the "cream of the crop" have stayed, with one of them becoming a NYPD officer living locally.
- The neighborhood is also in CBS's eponymous 1979 sitcom, also based somewhat on The Lords of Flatbush movie but with five modern day newly high school-graduated 18-ish year olds.
- The Mario Brothers, Mario and Luigi, from the Mario video game franchise, are said to be from Flatbush. In the animated TV series The Super Mario Bros. Super Show!, as well as the Super Mario Bros. Hollywood movie, Mario and Luigi's business, "Mario Brothers Plumbing Services", is operated out of Flatbush.
- Philip J. Fry, from the TV series Futurama, is originally from Flatbush.
- Flatbush is the setting of the TV series Flatbush Misdemeanors.
- Flatbush is one of the principal locations featured in William Styron's novel Sophie's Choice. The protagonist, Stingo, takes up residence there in 1947. He befriends Sophie and Nathan, and soon learns of Sophie's tortured history.
- Claudius Lyon, the parody of the fictional detective Nero Wolfe created by Loren Estleman, lives in a brownstone in Flatbush as part of his efforts to mimic Wolfe's lifestyle.
- In The Incredible Mr. Limpet (1964), Bessie (Carole Cook) tells her husband Henry (Don Knotts) that "if you paid half as much attention to me as you do those fish I'd be the happiest wife in Flatbush."

== Notable residents ==
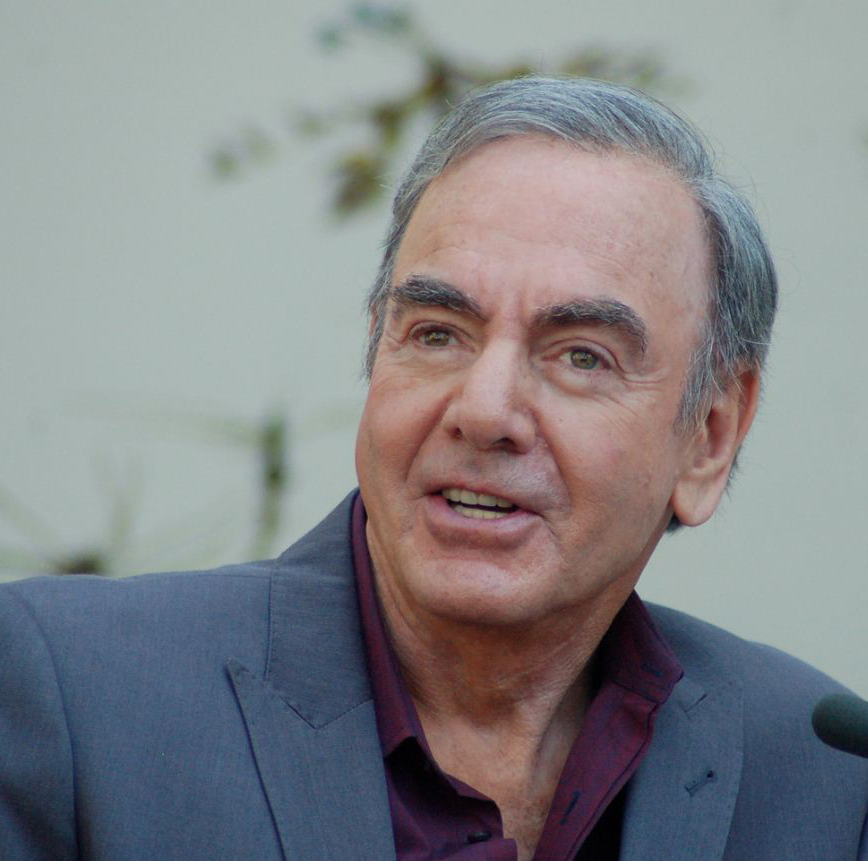
Neil Diamond

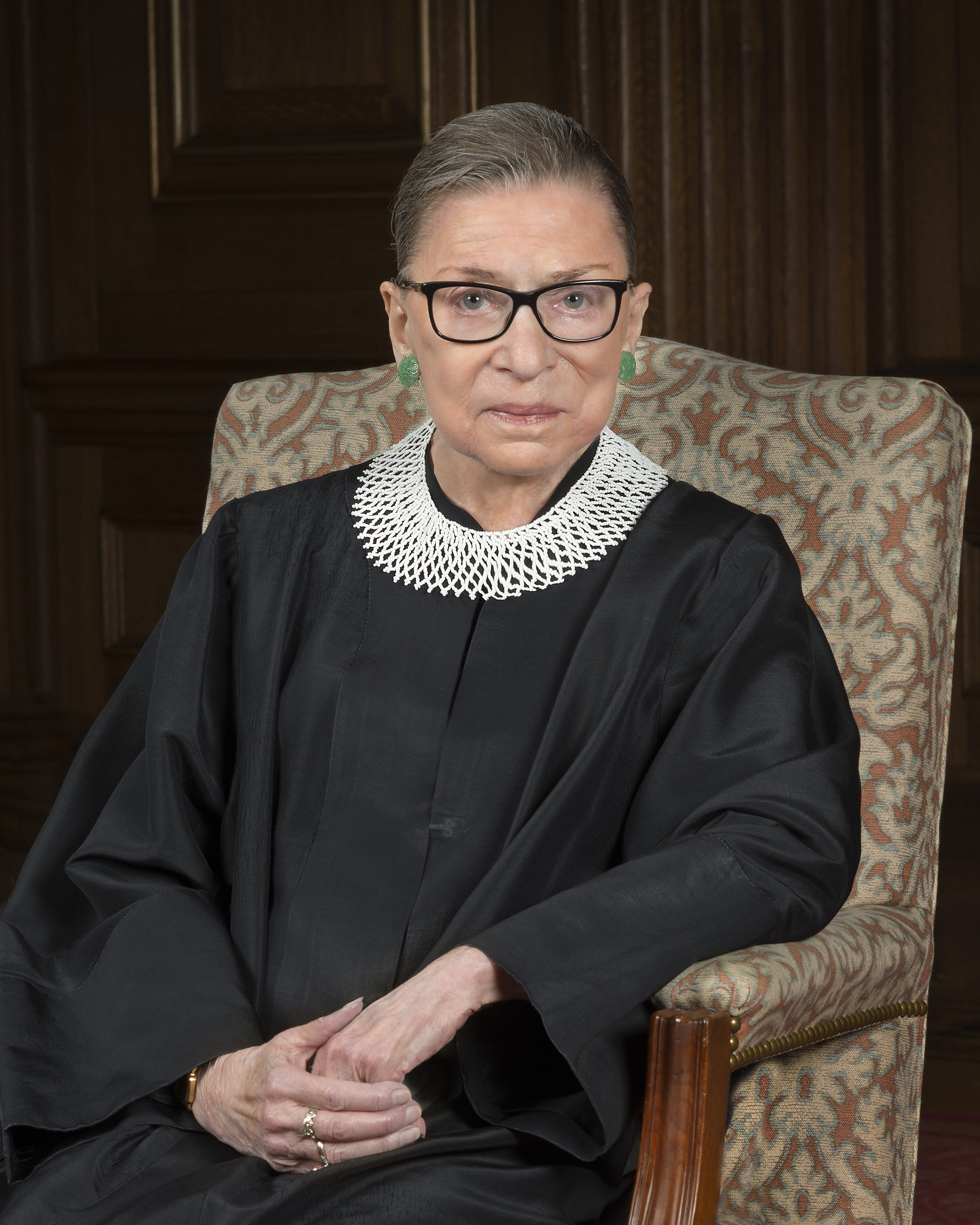
Ruth Bader Ginsburg

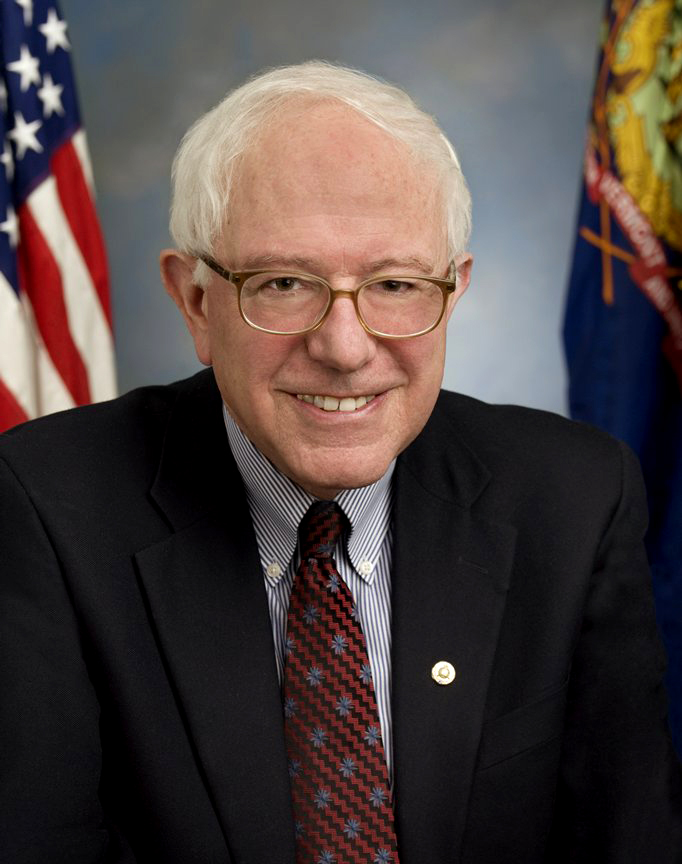
Bernie Sanders

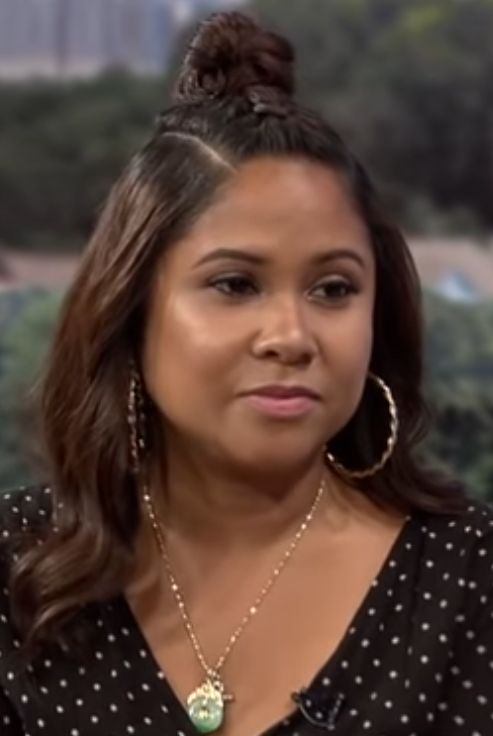
Angela Yee

Notable residents of Flatbush have included:

- Michael Badalucco (born 1954), actor
- Joseph Barbera (1911–2006), animator
- Dane Clark (1912–1998), actor
- Yvette Clarke (born 1964), U.S. congresswoman and former New York City councilwoman
- Roz Chast (born 1954), cartoonist for The New Yorker
- Al Davis (1929–2011), owner and general manager of the Oakland Raiders
- Neil Diamond (born 1941), singer
- David Draiman (born 1973), vocalist for Disturbed
- Richard Fariña (1937–1966), folksinger, novelist and poet
- Patrick Fitzgerald (born 1960), attorney.
- Connie Fleming, fashion model
- Sol Forman (1903–2001), restaurateur, owner of Peter Luger Steak House
- Flatbush Zombies
- Ruth Bader Ginsburg (1933–2020), United States Supreme Court Justice
- Susan Hayward (1917–1975), actress.
- Leona Helmsley (1920–2007), businesswoman
- John Jea (1773–unknown), writer best known for his autobiography describing his time in slavery in Flatbush
- JPEGMafia (born 1989), rapper and record producer
- Eric Kaplan (born 1971), television writer and producer
- Donald Keene (1922–2019), historian, teacher, writer and Japanologist.
- Alvin Klein (c. 1938–2009), theater critic for The New York Times
- Talib Kweli (born 1975), rapper, entrepreneur and activist.
- Jackie Loughery (1930–2024), actress and beauty pageant titleholder who was crowned Miss USA 1952.
- Joe Paterno (1926–2012), football coach
- Red Cafe, rapper
- Moi Renée (died 1997), singer and performer
- Chubb Rock, rapper
- Bernie Sanders (born 1941), politician and activist
- Mimi Sheraton (born Miriam Solomon; 1926–2023), food critic and writer
- Sheff G (born 1998), Brooklyn drill rapper
- Richard Sheirer
- Keeth Smart (born 1978), Olympic sabre fencer
- Barbra Streisand (born 1942), singer and actress
- Bruce Sudano (born 1948), musician and songwriter
- Paul Sylbert (1928–2016), production designer, art director and set designer.
- Don Vultaggio, billionaire co-founder of Arizona Beverage Company
- Devin Wenig (born 1966), business executive, president and CEO of eBay, CEO of Thomson Reuters Markets
- Angela Yee (born 1976), radio personality
