= Peter Luger =

German chef and restaurateur

- Born: January 22, 1866; Kingdom of Bavaria
- Died: January 21, 1941 (aged 74); Valley Stream, New York, U.S.
- Known for: Peter Luger Steak House

Peter Luger (January 22, 1866 – January 21, 1941) was a German chef and restaurateur, who founded Peter Luger Steak House in 1887.

== Early life ==
Peter Luger was born in the Kingdom of Bavaria, which became part of the German Empire when he was around 4. He immigrated to the United States when he was 13 years old. He lived in Brooklyn.

== Restaurant business ==
In 1887, Peter opened a pool hall and bowling alley with his nephew Carl in Williamsburg, Brooklyn, called "Carl Luger's Café, Billiards and Bowling Alley". Peter transformed the building into a steak house and renamed it to Peter Luger Steak House. Peter was known for his serious demeanor and was present almost every evening. He created a "no-frills" atmosphere in his restaurant.

Other sources say it was his father Carl that founded the original business and nephew Carl was the chef when Peter inherited the business after his father's death.

== Death ==
Luger died on January 21, 1941, one day before his 75th birthday, after suffering a heart attack at the Long Island Rail Road station in Valley Stream, where Luger had opened another restaurant. Upon his death, Luger left a $241,806 estate (equivalent to $5,300,000 in 2025). Ownership of the restaurant passed to his son Frederick Luger. Frederick was unable to maintain the quality of steak his father served and sold the failing business to longtime customer Sol Forman, who owned a metalware store across the street. Forman restored the restaurant to its original prestige.
