= Howard J. Rubenstein =

American lawyer (1932–2020)

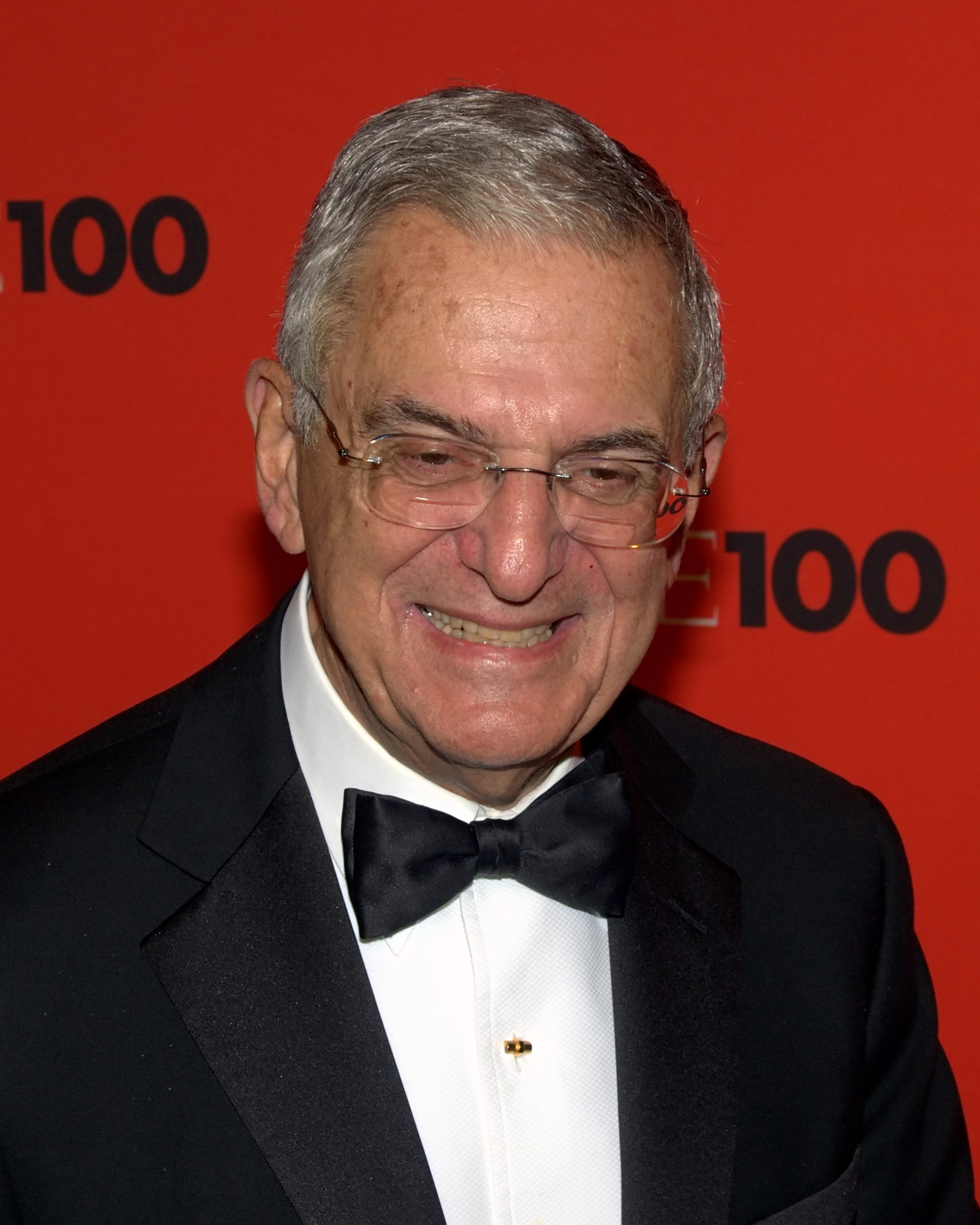
- Rubenstein at the 2010 Time 100 Gala
- Born: February 3, 1932; Brooklyn, New York City, U.S.
- Died: December 29, 2020 (aged 88); Manhattan, New York City, U.S.
- Education: University of Pennsylvania (BS); St. John's University (JD)
- Occupation: Lawyer
- Known for: Public relations
- Relatives: Sol Forman (father-in-law)
- Website: rubenstein.com/our-founder

Howard Joseph Rubenstein (February 3, 1932 – December 29, 2020)was an American lawyer and public relations expert. Rudolph Giuliani called him "the dean of damage control". He began his PR practice from his parents' kitchen and it grew to become the most influential public relations organization in New York City. His clients included the New York Yankees, News Corporation, Columbia University, the New York Philharmonic, and Jeffrey Epstein.

== Early life and education ==
Rubenstein grew up in a Jewish-American household in Bensonhurst, Brooklyn, on 74th Street near Bay Parkway with an elder sister, June. His mother, Ada, an immigrant from Russia from age nine, was a homemaker, and his father, Sam, was a crime reporter for the New York Herald Tribune. He graduated from Midwood High School in Brooklyn, and then from the University of Pennsylvania Phi Beta Kappa in 1953 with a degree in economics. He then attended Harvard Law School, but dropped out partway through the first semester.

Rubenstein took night classes at the St. John's University School of Law and graduated first in his class in 1959.

== Career ==
Rubenstein began writing press releases for a Brooklyn nursing home, the Menorah Home and Hospital for the Aged and Infirm, after his father introduced him to some officials at the home. Initially he worked out of his parents' kitchen, but later moved out after his parents refused to answer the phone saying "Rubenstein Associates".

Business grew quickly; as Rubenstein later said, "I was the only Democratic press agent in Brooklyn, so the politicians started coming to me". After graduating from law school in 1959, he took a job as an assistant counsel to the United States House Committee on the Judiciary, but quit after six months.

Rubenstein was the president and founder of Rubenstein Associates, which has been described as the most influential public relations organization in New York City. It has two affiliates: Rubenstein Public Relations and Rubenstein Communications, Inc. The firm was founded in 1954. His more notable clients included many of New York's iconic organizations including: the New York Yankees, News Corporation, Columbia University, New York Philharmonic, Rupert Murdoch since 1976, both Fred Trump and Donald Trump since 1973, and the Metropolitan Opera.

Rubenstein was also instrumental in making the New York City Marathon the world's largest and one of the World Marathon Majors, and for many years he represented the Quinnipiac Poll.

Rubenstein was described by Archie Obrien of Everything PR as "a PR genius" and "public relations royalty".

== Personal life ==
In 1959, Rubenstein married Amy Forman, whose father, Sol Forman, had purchased the Peter Luger Steak House in 1950. They had a daughter, Roni (born 1961), and three sons, David (1962–1971), Richard (born 1965), and Steven (born 1969).

Rubenstein died at his home in Manhattan on December 29, 2020, at age 88.
