= Vultaggio =

Vultaggio is an Italian surname. Notable people with the surname include:

- Don Vultaggio (born 1951/1952), American billionaire co-founder of Arizona Beverage Company
- Lisa Vultaggio (born 1973), Canadian actress

== See also ==
- Voltaggio (surname)
