= Flatbush Cats =

Non-profit organization in New York City

- Founded: 2018
- Type: 501(c)(3)
- Purpose: Cat adoption, fostering, trap-neuter-return
- Location: Flatbush, Brooklyn, New York City
- Region served: Flatbush, Brooklyn
- Website: www.flatbushcats.org

Flatbush Cats is a non-profit organization in Flatbush, Brooklyn specializing in cat rescue. The organization employs trap–neuter–return and adoption programs to reduce the stray cat population in Flatbush. Flatbush Cats has a substantial social media following and relies heavily on volunteers, with The Guardian describing the organization as being one of the most effective crowd-sourced rescue efforts in New York City.

== Description ==
Flatbush Cats was established by Will Zweigart in 2018. The organization conducts trap–neuter–return operations to help manage the stray and feral cat population in Brooklyn's Flatbush neighborhood; this method helps to reduce the effects of cat overpopulation in the dense urban landscape of New York City. Flatbush Cats also provides training services for volunteers who want to employ trap–neuter–return. In addition to trap–neuter–return, the organization provides adoption, fostering, and medical services for stray cats and kittens. The organization saw a large increase in its workload during the COVID-19 pandemic, during which event the City of New York had cut funding for other programs working to control the city's cat population.

In 2023, the organization opened Flatbush Veterinary Clinic, a 3700 square foot veterinary clinic in Flatbush, focusing on TNR programs and veterinary care for pet owners in need who cannot afford it.

The organization is a 501(c)(3) organization and relies entirely on donations for funding. Flatbush Cats also relies heavily on volunteers in the Flatbush neighborhood. The organization has relatively large social media presence, maintaining an Instagram account and YouTube channel.
