= Voltaggio (surname) =

Voltaggio is a surname. Notable people with the surname include:

- Bryan Voltaggio (born 1976), American chef
- Michael Voltaggio (born 1978), American chef, brother of Bryan
- Vic Voltaggio (born 1941), American baseball umpire

== See also ==
- Voltaggio
- Vultaggio
