= John Ferolito =

American entrepreneur

John Ferolito is an American entrepreneur who is the co-founder of the Arizona Beverage Company, known for its eponymous iced tea.

== AriZona Iced Tea ==
Ferolito joined with partner Don Vultaggio in the 1970s to establish a Brooklyn-based discount beer and soda delivery company, starting with a used Volkswagen bus and adding trucks as the business grew. The company ventured into flavored seltzer and its own brand of malt liquor in its early years. AriZona Iced Tea, the company's flagship product, was first introduced in 1992.

== AriZona buyout ==
After a falling-out between the two founding partners, Vultaggio prevailed in a 2012 suit against Ferolito. The New York Supreme Court, Appellate Division ruled that the company could buy out Ferolito's half-interest, which Ferolito had sought to sell to major international beverage companies. While Vultaggio's attorneys pointed to a 2007 estimated value of $430 million for the company, Ferolito estimated that the company that had become Beverage Marketing USA Inc. was worth as much as $6 billion.

== Golf injury lawsuit ==
On a 1994 golf outing at the East Orange Golf Course, Ferolito hit a mulligan, and struck Jeffrey Schick in the eye, knocking him unconscious. Schick sued, claiming that Ferolito had been negligent. The incident occurred at the 16th hole of the East Orange Golf Course, where Ferolito and his partner had joined together with another pair of players. While the general legal principle is that accidents and injuries are an expected result of sports activities and that individuals assume that risk when they participate, the attorney for the person hit by Ferolito's errant shot argued that "anticipating that someone is going to hit a mulligan at point-blank range is not a standard part of the game".
