= Arizona Beverage Company =

American beverage producer

Arizona Beverage Company, Ltd.

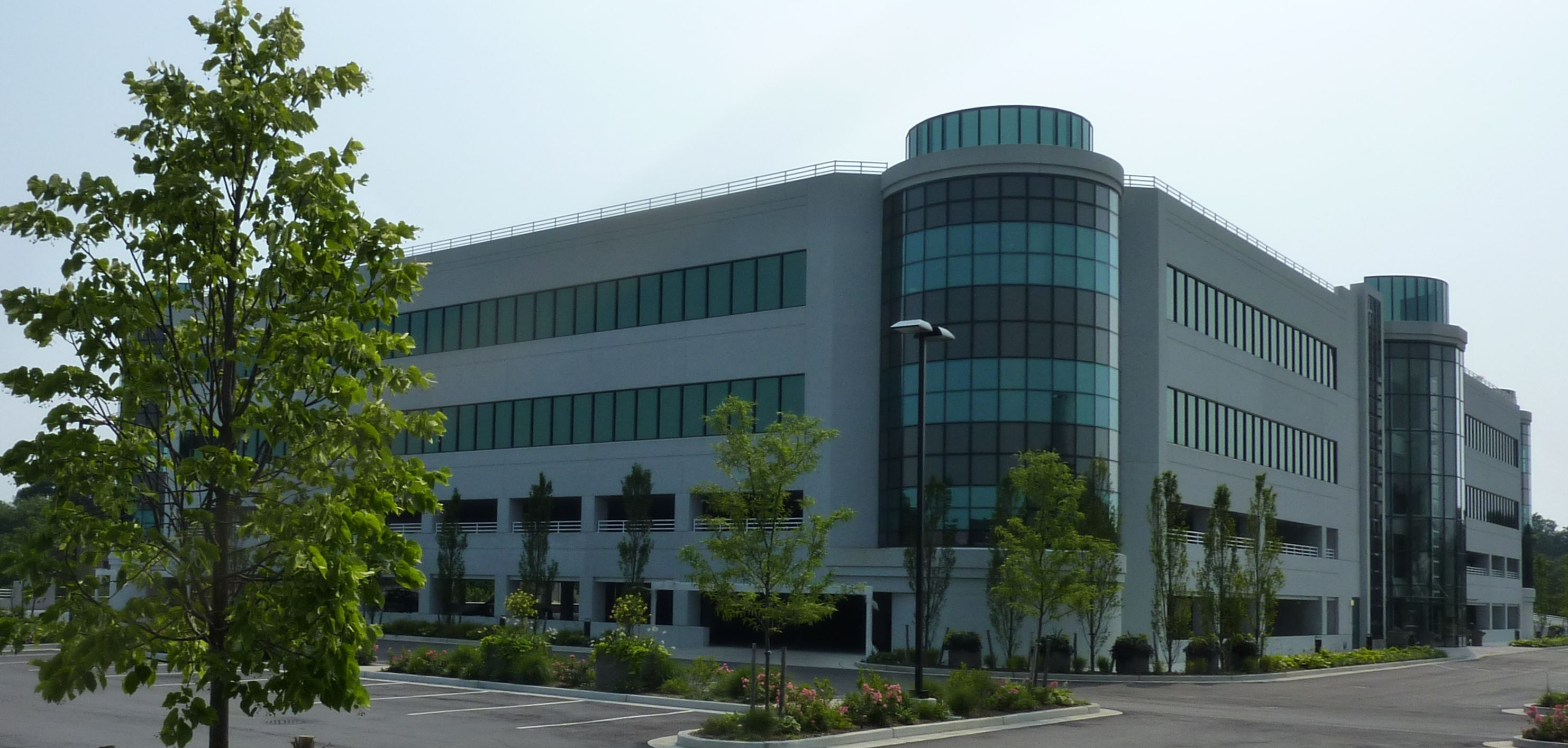
- The company's headquarters in Woodbury, New York
- Type: Private
- Industry: Food & drink
- Predecessor: Ferolito, Vultaggio & Sons (1971)
- Founded: May 5, 1992; 34 years ago in Brooklyn, New York, U.S.
- Founders: Don Vultaggio; John Ferolito
- Headquarters: Woodbury, New York, U.S.
- Areas served: Worldwide, mainly in the United States, Canada and Mexico
- Key people: Don Vultaggio (Chairman); David Menashi (Vice Chairman); Abid Rizvi (CEO); Spencer Vultaggio (CMO); Wesley Vultaggio (CCO)
- Products: Ready-to-drink teas, juices, and coffees, snacks and alcoholic beverages
- Brands: AriZona Tea, Sunbrew Coffee
- Revenue: ~3.0B
- Parent: Hornell Brewing Co., Inc.
- Website: www.drinkarizona.com

Arizona Beverages USA (stylized as AriZona or AriZZona) is a producer of many flavors of iced tea, juice cocktails, and energy drinks based in Woodbury, New York. Arizona's first product was made available in 1992, to compete with Snapple, which also originated in New York.

AriZona is known for its "Big Can" drinks holding 22 US fl oz (650 mL) of iced teas, juice drinks, and other beverages with markers indicating their intended retail price of US$0.99 in the United States and C$1.50 in Canada.

The "Arnold Palmer blend" of iced tea and lemonade has been commercially available since the 1990s; AriZona has since risen to become the most popular primary distributor of the beverage, with over $100 million in sales in 2010.

== History ==
The company roots trace back to 1971 when friends John Ferolito and Don Vultaggio opened a beverage distribution business, Ferolito, Vultaggio & Sons, in Brooklyn, New York. They used a Volkswagen bus to work delivering reduced-price beer and soda to Brooklyn homes and grocery stores, and eventually acquired a small fleet of trucks. The company later transitioned from distributor to producer of malt liquors, continuing their practice of selling at low prices.

In 1990, they saw the success of Snapple (also a Long-Island-based company founded in the 1970s) bottled juices and teas, and attempted to make their product. To make the beverage stand out, they used bright, pastel packaging in 24 US fl oz (710 mL) "Big Can" tin cans. In 1992, they produced the first bottles of their own AriZona teas. Vultaggio said the name was originally Santa Fe, in reference to the adobe-style house he lived in, but he felt it did not look right on the packaging. He went with Arizona even though he had never been to the state and, in fact, had not even traveled west of the Mississippi River. According to Vultaggio's son Spencer, the can designs came from his mother, Eileen, whose water cooler inspired the lemon tea can design and whose perfume bottle, along with Spencer's coloring books, inspired the green tea design. Graphic designer Jean Pettine also worked on the initial designs; she would go on to design posters advertising the initial release of the green tea flavor.

By mid-1993 the four AriZona teas each were available in 7.7- and 16-ounce sizes as well as in the big can, in more than 30 states, although a majority of their sales came from New York, New Jersey, Detroit, and Miami. By the end of 1994, AriZona Iced Tea was being sold in all 50 states, with estimated sales of $300 million a year, compared to an estimated $10 to $20 million in 1992 and an estimated $130 million in 1993. In 1994, the company moved their headquarters from Brooklyn to Woodbury, New York on Long Island.

In 1993, they introduced their 20 US fl oz (590 mL) "Tall Boy" bottle. In 1995, they introduced a variety of sodas and root beers. In 1996, they introduced a new beer.

By 1996, the company was losing sales and iced tea market share. In 1997, AriZona began being sold in national retail chains. That same year, they shut down production of their carbonated beverage line.

In 2020, the company introduced a line of fruit snacks in mixed fruit, Arnold Palmer, and green tea varieties.

In 2024, the company opened AriZonaLand at its 70-acre (28 ha) facility in the Keasbey section of Woodbridge Township, New Jersey, offering visitors a "Willy-Wonka-esque" tour of its factory, complete with a gift shop and museum.

=== Prices ===
The suggested retail price printed on the can has remained at 99 cents even with rising costs for the company and despite rising inflation. Retailers, however, can set their own price, with the company also producing cans without the 99¢ price on them as an option for retailers.

In 2025, it was reported Don Vultaggio was considering raising the price on canned products, such as AriZona Iced Tea "tallboys", due in part to tariffs imposed by the second Trump administration on imported fruit and aluminum. Vultaggio stated, "I hate even the thought of it. It would be a hell of a shame after 30-plus years. … Our price has been dramatically bumped up because of this tariff talk." The company's cans are produced with about 80 percent American recycled aluminum and approximately 20 percent Canadian aluminum; Vultaggio said that in addition to the levy imposed on Canadian aluminum, he expected American aluminum producers to raise their own prices in response to tariffs. A week later, Vultaggio announced that the company would not be raising prices, stating that they intend to "hold the line" against inflation. Vultaggio said, "I grew up in Brooklyn, and I worked for $1 an hour. I respect the value of $1. And I’d say, 'if I can help people who do that and give them a refreshing beverage for an affordable price, why not?' And since I can afford to do it, why not continue to do it?"

== Products ==
They also have a major line of merchandise and drink mixes, including products such as rollerblades, skateboard wheels, bags, accessories, and more.

=== Drinks ===
AriZona has a variety of drinks, including iced teas, juice drinks, energy drinks, diet drinks, and other beverages in a wide array of bottles, including:

- 22 US fl oz (650 mL) "Big Cans"
- 20 US fl oz (590 mL) "Tallboys"
- 128 US fl oz (3.8 L) gallon jugs
- 16.9 US fl oz (500 mL)
- 12 count variety packs
- 16 US fl oz (470 mL) Cold Brew teas

==== Alcoholic drinks ====
- "AriZona Hard" alcoholic drinks in 12 US fl oz (350 mL) cans in a variety of flavors, including hard teas, hard juices, and hard lemonades.
- "Arnold Palmer Spiked" iced teas in 12 US fl oz (350 mL) and 24 US fl oz (710 mL) cans
- "Velero" beer

=== Mixers ===
AriZona has mixers in three flavors:

- 20.4 US fl oz (600 mL) powder mixer canisters
- 10 count boxes of individual powder mixer packets
- 1.62 US fl oz (48 mL) liquid bottles

=== Snacks ===
- Fruit snacks in four flavors
- Nachos and Cheese Dip
- Salsa and Chips Dip
- Ice Pops

=== Apparel ===
AriZona has numerous apparel and merchandise options, with some collaborating with brands such as Anti Social Social Club and Adidas. Merchandise options include:

- T-shirts
- Bottoms
- Sweatshirts & Hoodies
- Coats & Jackets
