= Sol Forman =

American restaurateur (1903–2001)

- Born: July 1, 1903; Manhattan, New York City, U.S.
- Died: November 22, 2001 (aged 98); Brooklyn, New York City, U.S.
- Occupations: Restaurateur; businessman
- Known for: Owner of Peter Luger Steak House
- Spouse: Marsha Forman
- Children: 3
- Relatives: Howard J. Rubenstein (son-in-law)

Sol Forman (July 1, 1903 – November 22, 2001) was an American restaurateur who owned Peter Luger Steak House.

== Biography ==
Forman was born on the Lower East Side of Manhattan around July 1, 1903. He dropped out of high school to support his family and formed a partnership with his brother and sister to start a metalware business called Forman Family, which was located across the street from Peter Luger Steak House. Forman became a frequent customer of the steakhouse and bought the restaurant at auction as the only bidder after it was forced to close in 1950 due to declining sales.

Forman helped revive the ailing steakhouse and transformed it into one of New York City's most well-known steakhouses. He continue to run the restaurant after he closed his metalware business in the 1980s. He opened a branch of the steakhouse on Long Island in 1961.

== Personal life ==
Forman lived in Flatbush, Brooklyn until his death. He died on November 22, 2001, at 98 years old. He passed on ownership to his daughters, Marilyn Spiera and Amy Rubenstein, who run the business along with Spiera's daughter Jody Storch. All of his children graduated from Barnard College.

His daughter, Elissa "Ellie" Cullman, is married to Edgar M. Cullman, Jr., son of Edgar M. Cullman, who owned the General Cigar Company. His other daughter, Amy Rubenstein, was married to public relations expert Howard J. Rubenstein until his death in 2020.
