= Don Vultaggio =

American billionaire businessman

- Born: Domenick Vultaggio; February 26, 1952 (age 74); Brooklyn (Flatbush), New York
- Occupation: Businessman
- Known for: Co-founder and chairman, Arizona Beverage Company
- Spouse: Ilene Vultaggio
- Children: 2

Domenick "Don" Vultaggio (born February 26, 1952) is an American billionaire businessman, best known as the co-founder and current chairman of the Arizona Beverage Company, the firm behind the popular AriZona Iced Tea brand. A Brooklyn native, Vultaggio began his career in beverage distribution before pivoting to ready-to-drink teas in the early 1990s.

Under his leadership, AriZona became one of the top-selling tea brands in the United States. He is also known for guarding the company's independence, taking full control of the business in 2015 after buying out his longtime partner, John Ferolito, following a protracted legal battle.

As of July 2024, his net worth was estimated at US$6.5 billion.

== Early life ==
Vultaggio grew up in Flatbush, a working-class neighborhood of Brooklyn, New York City, New York. His father was the manager of an A&P supermarket.

== Career ==
Vultaggio and his business partner John Ferolito started a beer distribution company in the 1980's. The company's Midnight Dragon malt liquor stirred up controversy for its racy advertisements. In the early 90's, Vultaggio's Crazy Hourse malt liquor, named after the Sioux warrior Crazy Horse was banned in many states after protests and lawsuits from various Native American groups.

Vultaggio made the move into ready-to-drink tea industry during that time, and in 1992, co-founded the Arizona Beverage Company with John Ferolito from a warehouse in Brooklyn. In 2015, following a lengthy and bitter legal battle, he bought out Ferolito for about $1 billion.

== Personal life ==
Vultaggio is married to Ilene, an artist. They have two sons, and had lived in Port Washington, New York. Their sons both work for the company; Wesley as chief creative officer and Spencer as chief marketing officer.

In 2004, they bought a two-acre "private peninsula" in Sands Point, New York, for $4 million, and finished building a 30-room mansion in 2007.
