= Peter Luger Steak House =

Restaurant in Brooklyn, New York, U.S.

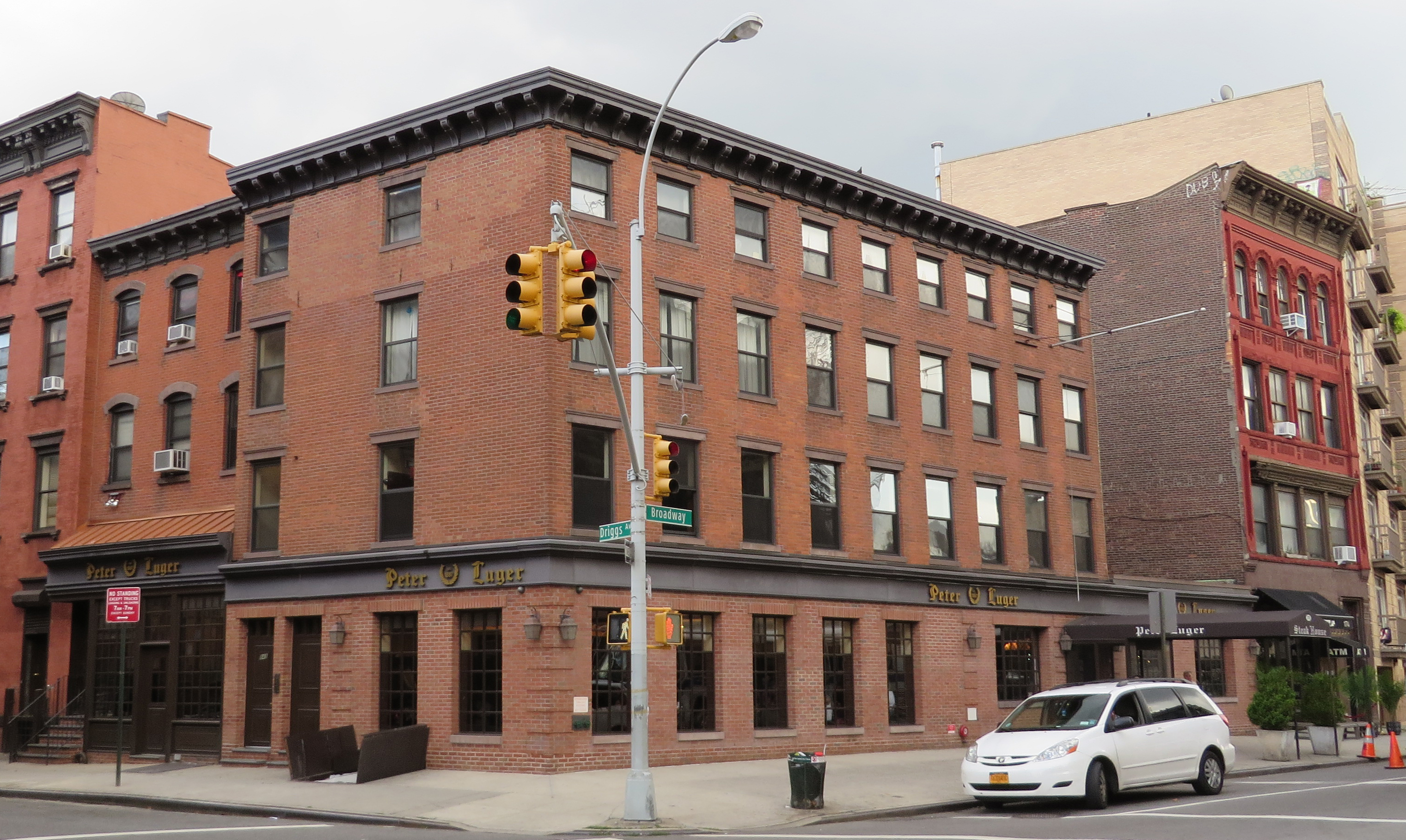
- The exterior of the Brooklyn establishment
- Interactive map of Peter Luger Steak House

Restaurant information
- Established: 1887; 139 years ago
- Owners: Amy Rubenstein; Marilyn Spiera
- Previous owners: Peter Luger; Frederick Luger; Sol Forman
- Food type: Steakhouse
- Location: 178 Broadway, Brooklyn, United States
- Coordinates: 40.7099°N 73.9626°W
- Other locations: Great Neck, Ebisu, Paradise, Nevada
- Website: www.peterluger.com

Peter Luger Steak House is a steakhouse located in the Williamsburg section of Brooklyn, New York City, with a second location in Great Neck, New York, in the western part of Long Island. It was named to the James Beard Foundation's list of "America's Classics" in 2002 and is the third oldest operating steakhouse in New York City, after Keens and Old Homestead Steakhouse.

On January 10, 2022, Peter Luger's and Caesars Palace announced the opening of a third location in Caesars Palace Las Vegas, Nevada in the location formerly occupied by Rao's.

The Brooklyn location is known for its long wooden bar, and the "dining rooms have a Teutonic air, with exposed wooden beams, burnished oak wainscoting, brass chandeliers and weathered beer-hall tables".

== History ==
The Brooklyn location was established in 1887 as "Carl Luger's Café, Billiards and Bowling Alley" in the then-predominantly German neighborhood that would shortly thereafter be in the shadow of the Williamsburg Bridge. German-born Peter Luger (1866–1941) was the owner, and nephew Carl was the chef. When Peter died in 1941, his son Frederick took over and the restaurant declined.

In 1950, Frederick closed the restaurant and put it up for auction. Sol Forman and Seymour Sloyer, who owned a metal giftware factory across the street, bought it as partners for a "whimsically low" bid. According to Lester Magrill, the auctioneer, the purchase price was $35,000, which included the building as well as the restaurant. According to one history, "The neighborhood was declining, filling up with Hasidic Jews, whose kosher rules forbade the eating of Luger's hindquarters. Both Forman and Sloyer had been eating at Luger for twenty-five years, and they needed a place to take their clients. They were the only bidders during the auction." In 1968, Craig Claiborne of The New York Times gave a four star review of the steakhouse under the new ownership.

In 1968, Forman and Sloyer opened a Great Neck, New York, location. It was closed in 1984 after a severe fire, but reopened a year and a half later in 1986.

Sloyer died in 2001 at the age of 85, and Forman died in 2001 at the age of 98. Ownership of the restaurant passed to Forman's daughters and Sloyer's wife and children.

In July 2009, while having dinner at Peter Luger, New York Governor David Paterson had Richard Ravitch secretly sworn in as Lieutenant Governor to oversee the stalemate-stricken State Senate.

In 2021, the restaurant opened a new branch in Ebisu, Tokyo. In November 2023, Peter Luger Las Vegas opened at Caesars Palace in Las Vegas. The grand opening which occurred on November 10 was attended by Peter Luger/Caesars Palace executives. The restaurant houses $1 Million worth of dry-aged beef at all times. According to Gregory Mottola, a Cigar Aficionado reviewer, ”The new Las Vegas Peter Luger Steak House in Caesars Palace is not only as good as its Brooklyn progenitor, it’s actually better.”

News of the restaurant’s plans were first reported in a press release from Caesars Entertainment Inc. on January 10, 2022. Peter Luger Las Vegas was the first American Peter Luger location outside of New York, the first domestic expansion in 60 years, and was projected to finish construction at the end of 2022. The steakhouse is located near Mr Chow in Caesars Palace, and took over a space that once housed Rao's, which closed in November 2021. It is one of four celebrity chef-branded restaurants at the casino. The 8,700 square foot interior was done by Jeffrey Beers International. The interior was shortlisted at the 2024 Design Et Al International Hotel & Property Awards in the category of “Restaurant within a Hotel – Global”.

== Reviews ==
Peter Luger was named to the James Beard Foundation's list of "America's Classics" in 2002.

It received one Michelin star from the inaugurual year of the Michelin Guide for New York in 2006. In 2022, the restaurant lost its Michelin star.

In 2019, New York Times restaurant critic Pete Wells gave the restaurant a scathing, zero-star review, a decline from Frank Bruni's 2007 two-star review, a three-star review in 1995 by Ruth Reichl, and a four-star review in 1968 by Craig Claiborne.

== Menu ==
The menu at Peter Luger is sparse, with the focal point being a porterhouse steak sized for two to four.

Peter Luger also sells hamburgers, which are only available for lunch.

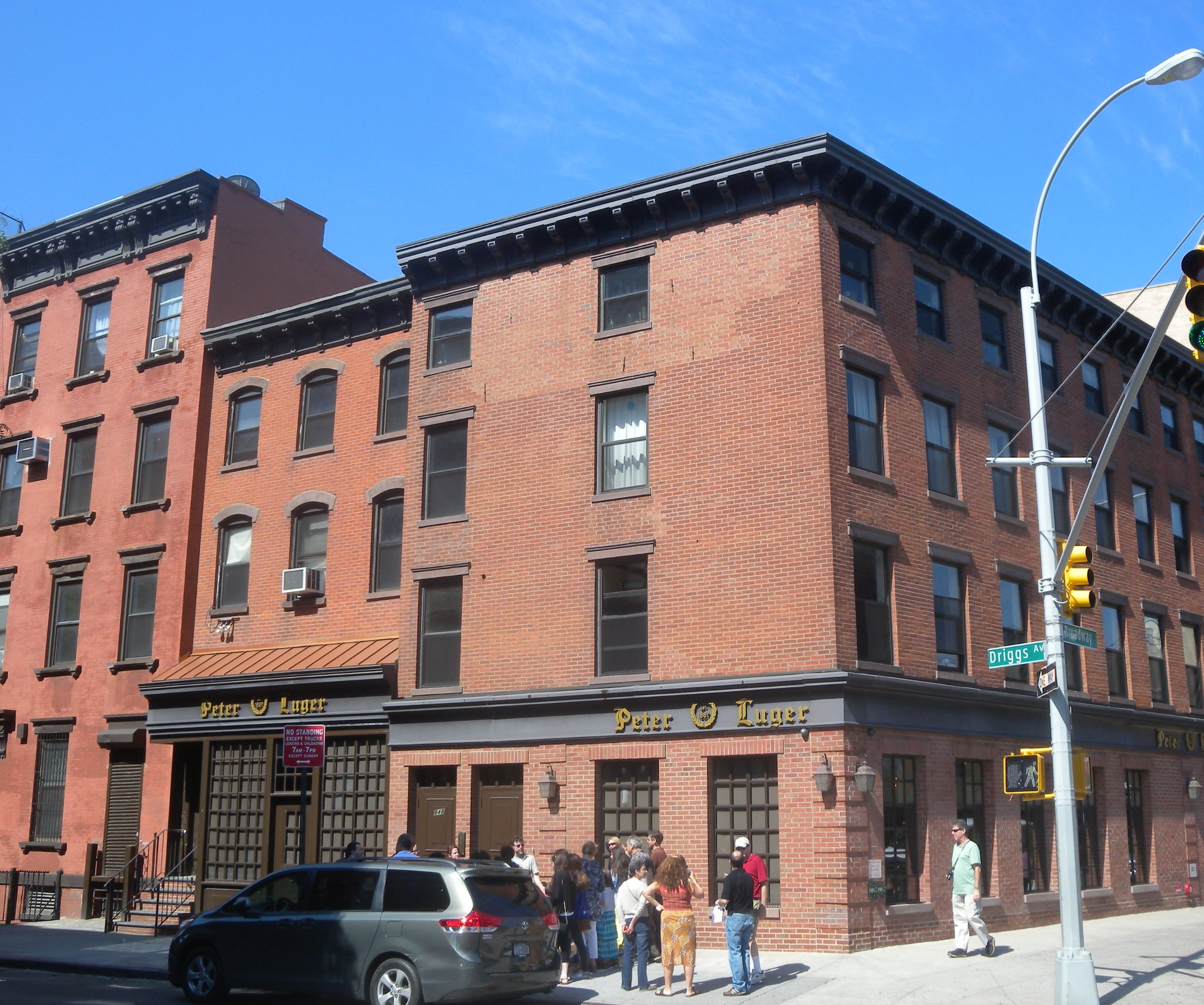
On Broadway, Williamsburg, Brooklyn

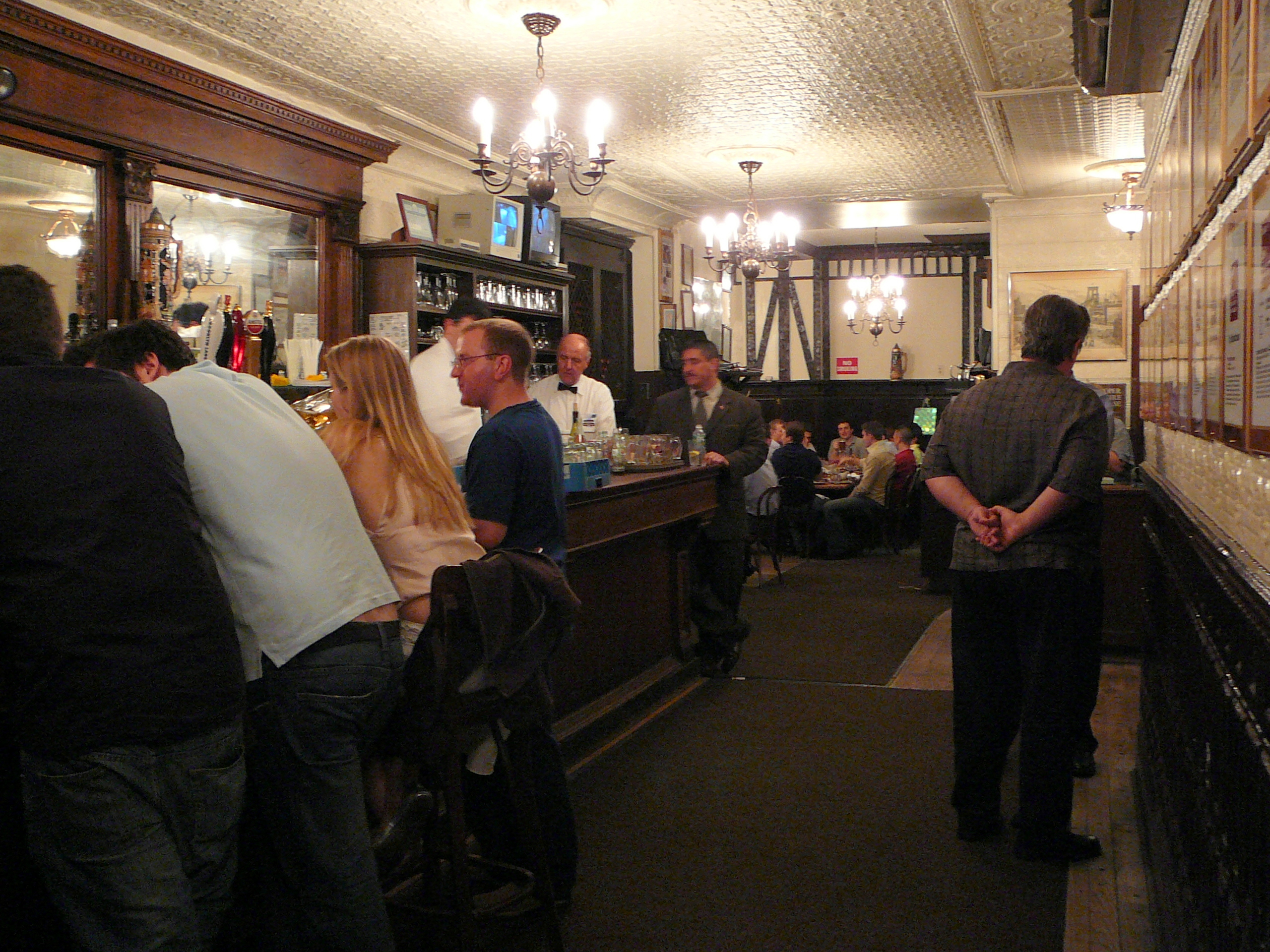
The interior bar section of the Brooklyn establishment

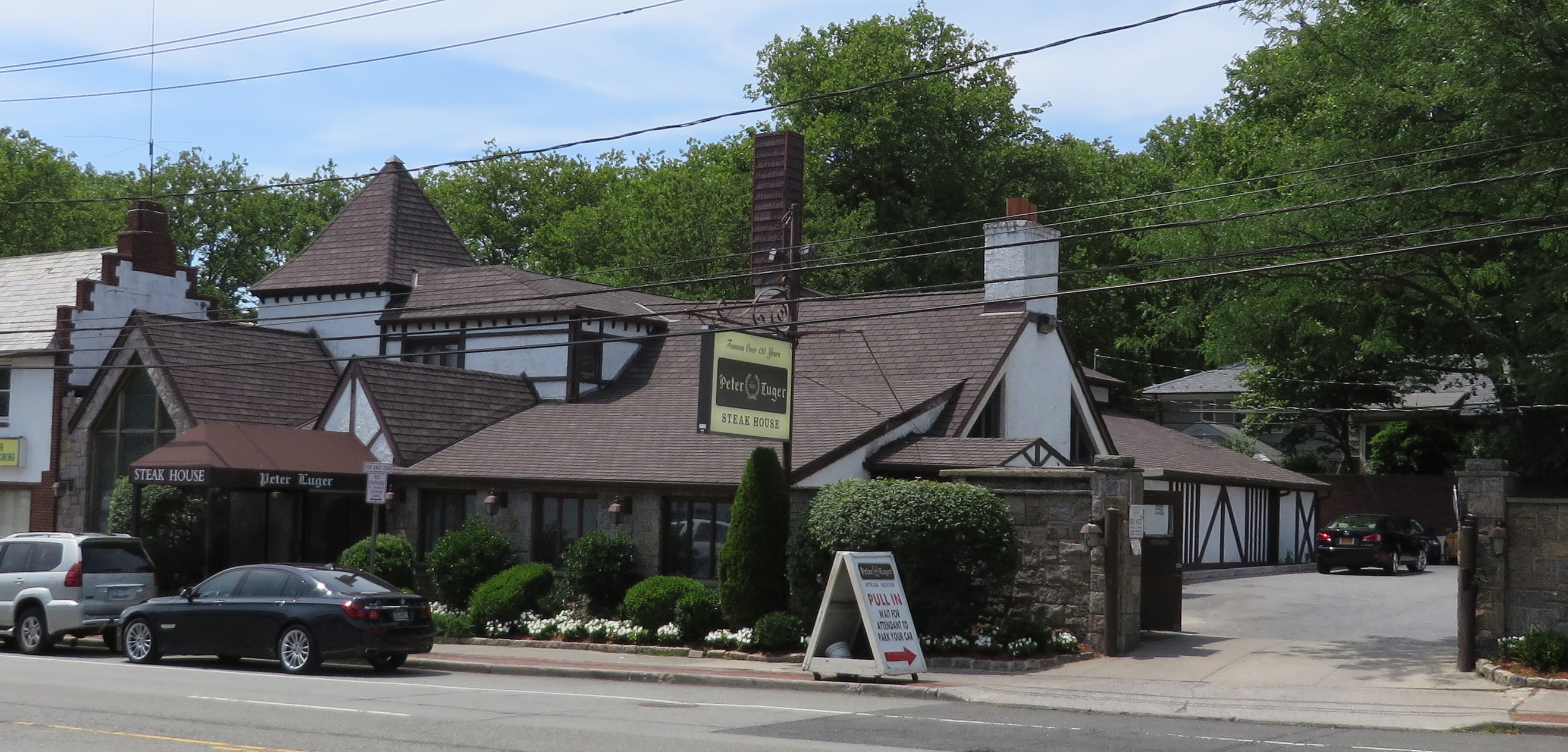
Great Neck location

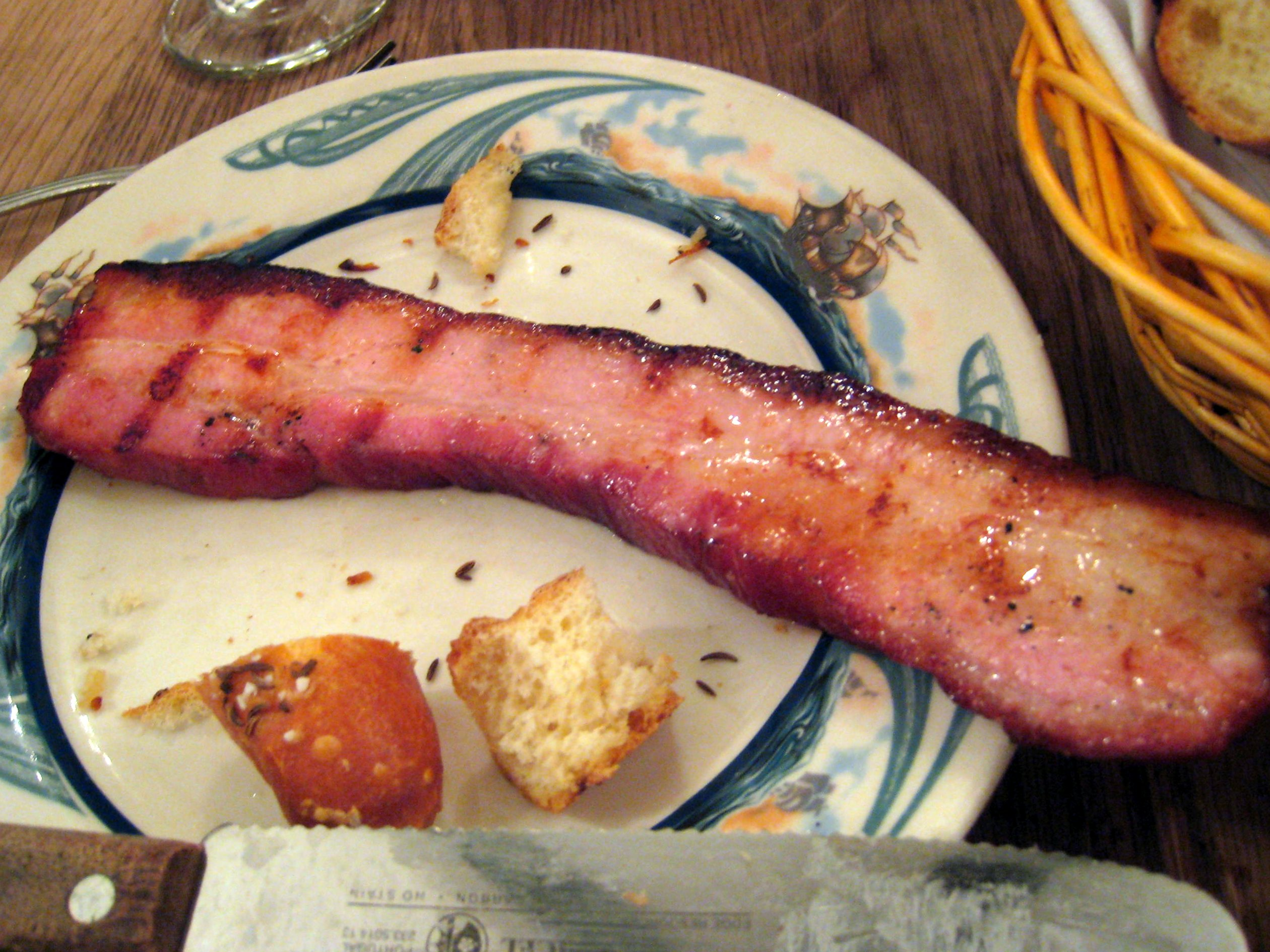
Peter Luger bacon

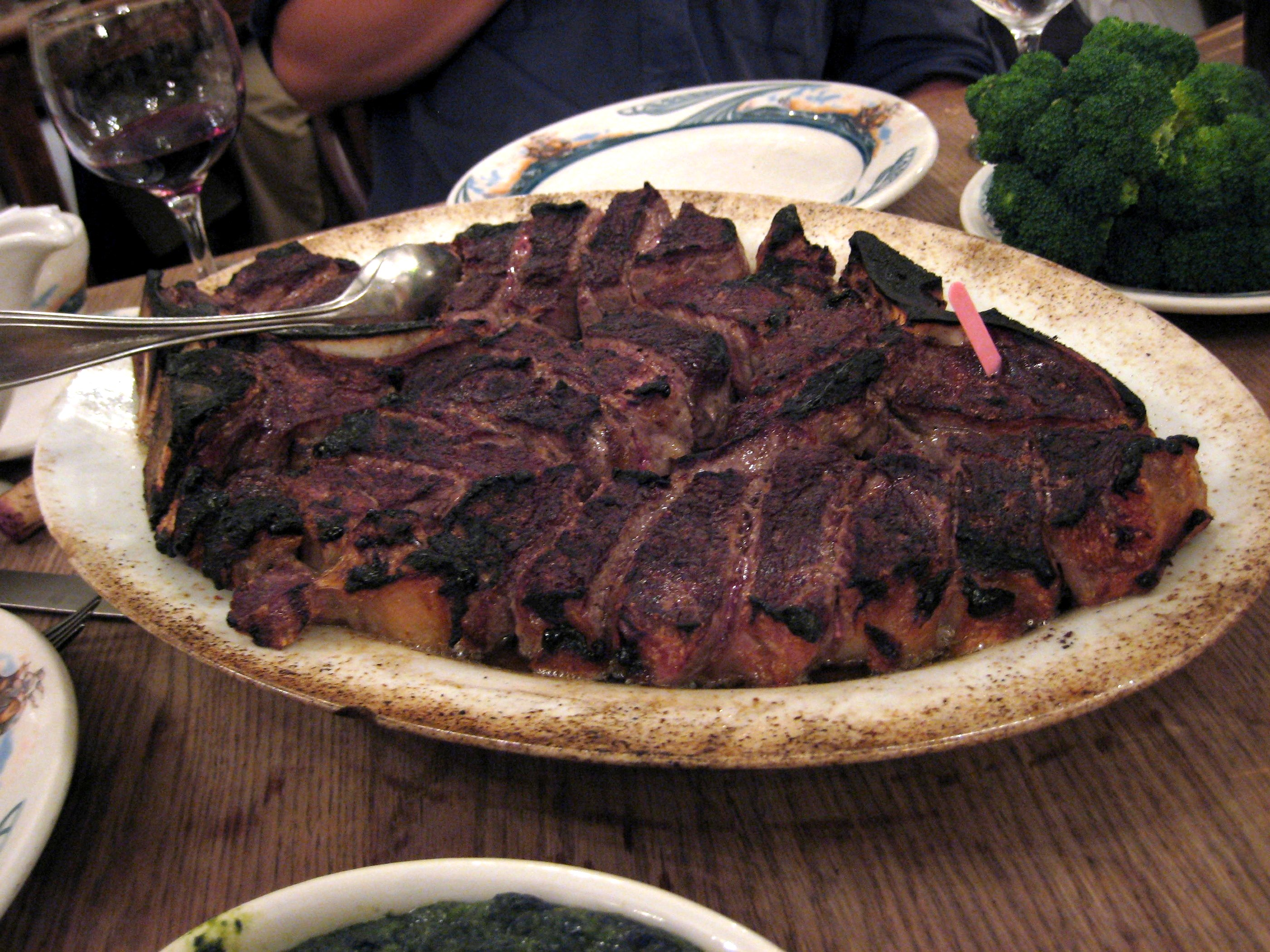
Steak served at Peter Luger

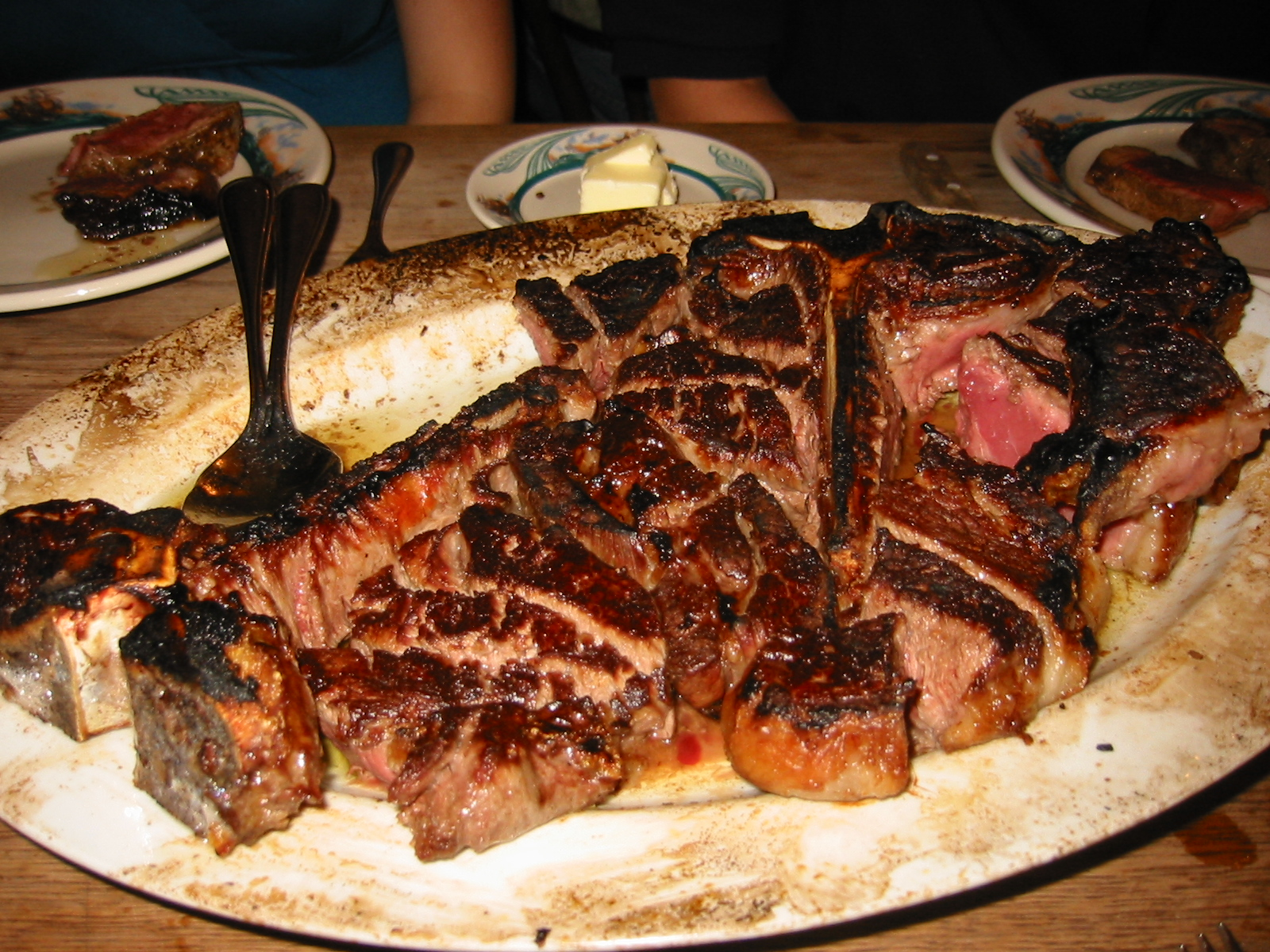
Steak for 4, served medium rare

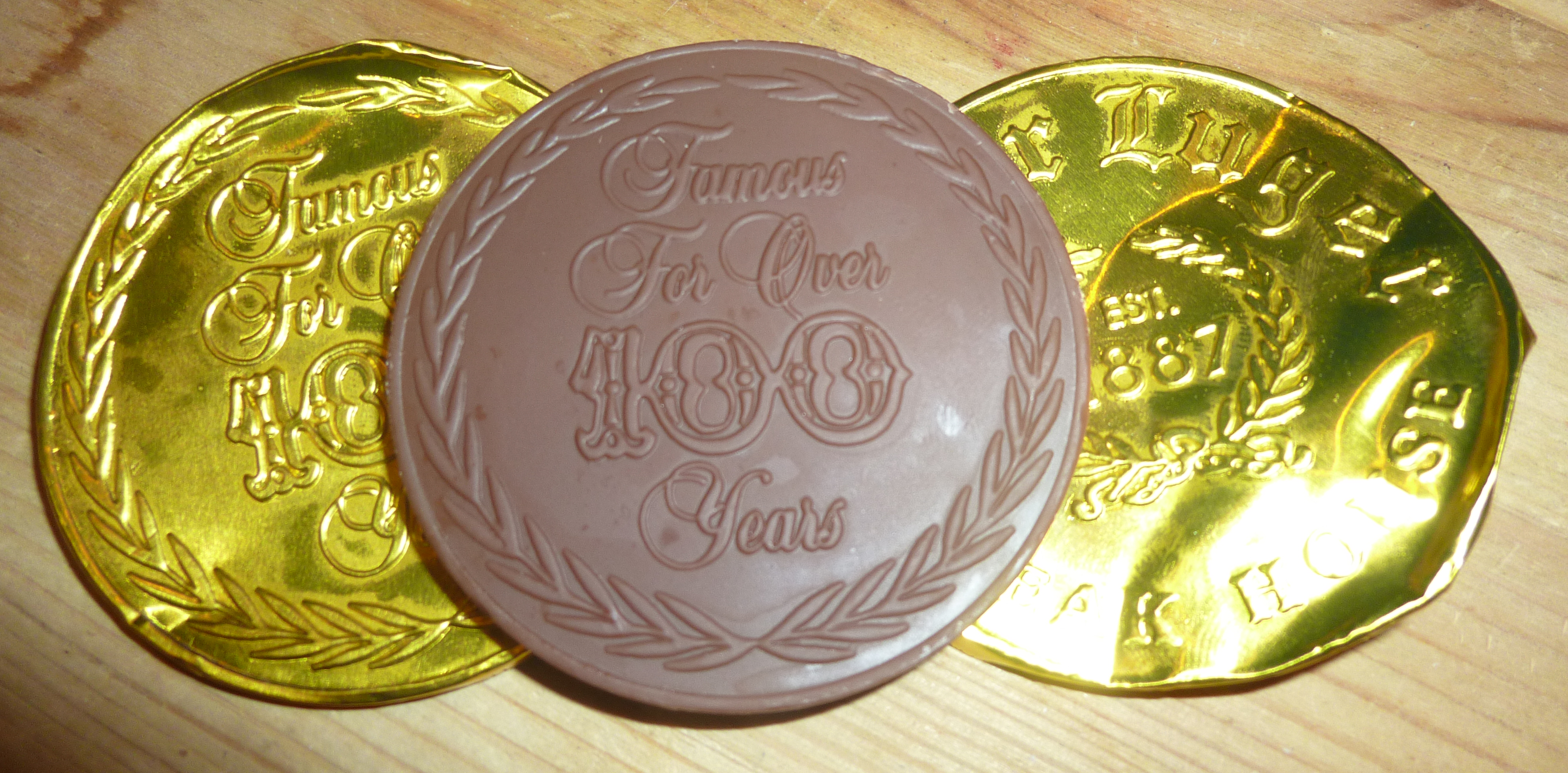
After dessert, Peter Luger serves each diner a complimentary chocolate coin.

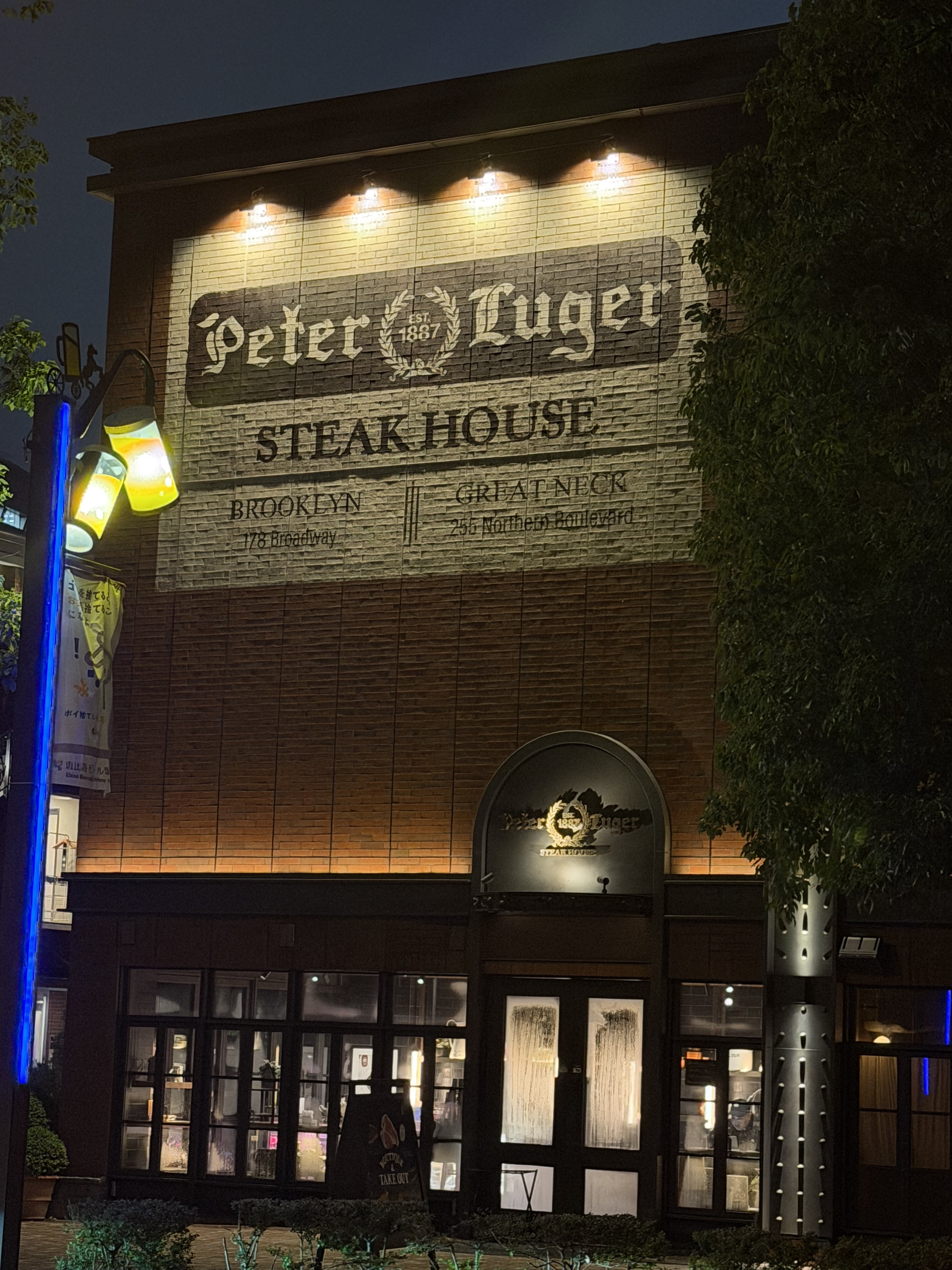
Tokyo location

== See also ==
- List of the oldest restaurants in the United States
- List of restaurants in the Las Vegas Valley
- List of restaurants in New York City
- List of steakhouses
