= Anglicisation of names =

Modifying personal names for English

The anglicisation of personal names is the change of non-English-language personal names to spellings nearer English sounds ("anglicisation"), or substitution of equivalent or similar English personal names in the place of non-English personal names.

== Anglicisation of personal names ==
=== Classical, medieval and Renaissance figures ===
A small number of figures, mainly very well-known classical and religious writers, appear under English names—or more typically under Latin names, in English texts. This practice became prevalent as early as in English-language translations of the New Testament, where translators typically renamed figures such as Yeshua and Simon bar-Jonah as Jesus and Peter, and treated most of the other figures in the New Testament similarly. In contrast, translations of the Old Testament traditionally use the original names, more or less faithfully transliterated from the original Hebrew. Transatlantic explorers such as Zuan Chabotto and Cristoforo Colombo became popularly known as John Cabot and Christopher Columbus; the English-speaking world typically knows the French-born theologian Jean Calvin as John Calvin. Such anglicisations became less usual after the sixteenth century.

=== Non-English-language areas of Great Britain and Ireland ===
Most Gaelic language surnames of Ireland, Scotland, and the Isle of Man have been anglicized at some time. The Gaels were among the first Europeans to adopt surnames during the Dark Ages. Originally, most Gaelic surnames were composed of the given name of a child's father, preceded by Mac (son) or Nic (or Ní, both being variants of nighean, meaning daughter) depending on the gender. These surnames would not be passed down another generation, and a woman would keep her birth surname after marriage. The same was originally true of Germanic surnames which followed the pattern [father's given name]+son/daughter (this is still the case in Iceland, as exemplified by the singer Björk Guðmundsdóttir and former Prime Minister Sigmundur Davíð Gunnlaugsson). When referring to siblings collectively (or to members of a family or clan that share a "Mac-" surname), the prefix for son or daughter was pluralised. By example, MacAoidh (son of Hugh) becomes MicAoidh (sons of Hugh) and Clann MhicAoidh (literally children/descendants of Hugh). The Jacksons in English (with Jack being derived from John) would in Gaelic be rendered a MhicSheain (the sons of John).

Over the centuries, under the influence of post-medieval English practice, this type of surname has become static over generations, handed down the male lineage to all successive generations so that it no longer indicates the given name of a holder's father any more than the suffix -son on a Germanic language surname does today. Among English-speaking peoples of Gaelic heritage, the use of Nic as a prefix for daughters has been replaced by Mac, regardless of sex (as per Geraldine McGowan, Alyth McCormack, and Sarah McLachlan). Wives also began to take on the surnames of their husbands.

Another common pattern of surname was similar to that preceded by Mac/Nic, but instead was preceded by Ó or Ui, signifying a grandchild or descendant. Not all Gaelic surnames signified relationship to a forebear, however. Some signified an ancestral people or homeland, such as MacDhubhghaill (son of a dark-haired foreigner; referring to one type of Scandinavian), MacFhionnghaill (son of a fair-haired foreigner; also referring to a Scandinavian people), MacLachlainn or MacLachlainneach (son of a Scandinavian). Others indicated the town or village of a family's origin, sometimes disguised as an ancestor's name as in Ó Creachmhaoil, which prefixes a toponym as though it was the name of a person. As with other culturo-linguistic groups, other types of surnames were often used as well, including trade-names such as MacGhobhainn, Mac a'Ghobhainn or Mac Gabhainn (son of the smith), and physical characteristics such as hair colour.

In anglicizing Gaelic names, the prefixes Mac, Nic, and Ó were frequently removed (the name Ó Fathaigh, by example, was sometimes anglicized as Fahey or Fay, identically to the given name; Ó Leannáin and Ó Lionáin have both been anglicized as Lennon; Ó Ceallaigh and Ó Cadhla have been anglicized as Kelly). Where they were retained, Mac was often rendered Mc, M', or Mag- (the last is seen in renderings such as Maguire for Mac Uidhir) and Ó/Ui became O'. MacGhobhainn, Mac a'Ghobhainn and Mac Gabhainn (son of the smith) were anglicized as McGowan, Gowan, McGavin, and Gavin. In surnames which had been prefixed Mac (which includes most Manx surnames), the final hard c sound remained when the Mac was removed. As Gaelic spelling rules required the first letter of a name preceded by Mac or Nic to be lenited (providing it was a consonant other than l, n, or r, which are not generally lenited in Gaelic, or c or g; although in the case of the last two, they are lenited when the intended connotation is "son/daughter of" rather than a surname. By example, if stating that James (Scott) is the son of Calum (Stuart) in Gaelic, it would be phrased Seumas mac Chaluim, as distinct from Seumas MacCaluim for a James with the surname MacCaluim) with the addition of an h after it (originally, this had been indicated in handscript by a dot above the letter, but with the introduction of printing with movable type the h was substituted) after a consonant (silencing it, or changing its sound), and for the last vowel to be slender (i or e) if male, the anglicized form of a Gaelic name could look quite different. By example, MacPhearais (Mac+Pearas=son of Pierce) has been anglicized as Corish, and MacAonghais has been anglicized as MacAngus, MacInnis, MacInnes, Innis, Innes, and Guinness.

As with Gaelic and Germanic surnames, Welsh surnames and Cornish surnames had originally been mostly patronymic, though others contained toponymic elements, or were derived from trades, or personal characteristics. Surnames which remained fixed across generations, passed down along the male line of descent (provided parents were married) were adopted under the dictate of the English Government from the sixteenth century. As in the Gaelic-speaking areas, many Welsh (Cymric) patronyms were anglicised by omitting the prefix indicating son of and either exchanging the father's Welsh forename for its English equivalent, or re-spelling it according to English spelling rules, and, either way, most commonly adding -s to the end, so that the such as 'ap Hywell' became Powell, and 'ap Siôn' to Jones or Upjohn. The first generation to adopt this Anglicisation hereafter handed it down unchanged to children. Many Cornish (Kernewek) names have been anglicised in similar ways.

=== Immigration to English-speaking countries ===
Anglicisation of non-English-language names was common for immigrants, or even visitors, to English-speaking countries. An example is the German composer Johann Christian Bach, the "London Bach", who was known as "John Bach" after emigrating to England.

During the time in which there were large influxes of immigrants from Europe to the United States and United Kingdom during the 19th and 20th centuries, the given names and surnames of many immigrants were changed. This became known colloquially as the "Ellis Island Special", after the U.S. immigrant processing center on Ellis Island; contrary to popular myth, no names were ever legally changed at Ellis Island, and immigrants almost always changed them at their own discretion.

Traditionally common Christian given names could be substituted: such as James for the etymologically connected Jacques. Alternatively phonetical similarities, such as Joe for Giò (Giovanni or Giorgio); or abbreviation, Harry for Harilaos, or Ricky for Enrique (Henry), as common in Spanish, instead of for (Ricardo) Richard as in English.

The anglicisation of a personal name now usually depends on the preferences of the bearer. Name changes are less common today for Europeans emigrating to the United States than they are for people originating in, or descending from those who emigrated from, East Asian countries. Requests that the bearer anglicize their personal name against their wishes are viewed as a form of racism or xenophobia.

==== French surnames ====
French immigrants to the United States (both those of Huguenot and French-Canadian background) often accommodated those unfamiliar with French pronunciations and spellings by altering their surnames (or encounter having them altered) in either of two ways: spellings were changed to fit the traditional pronunciation (Pariseau became Parizo, Boucher became Bushey, Mailloux became Mayhew, Cartier became Carter, Carpentier became Carpenter), or pronunciations were changed to fit the spelling (Benoît, pronounced French pronunciation: [bənwa], became Benway, or Bennett /bɛnˈɔɪt/).

- Benoit: Bennett, Benning, Benway
- Boucher: Bush, Bushey
- Caúvin: Calvin
- Carpentier: Carpenter
- Carré: Carey, Carrey
- Carteret, Cartier: Carter
- Croquetagne: Crockett
- Cussaq: Cusack, Cusick
- DeMontgomerie: Montgomery
- Gordon, Goúrdon: Gordon
- Gránd, LeGránd: Grant
- Olivier: Oliver
- Parquier: Parker
- Phillippe: Philips, Phillips
- Poitier: Porter
- Steuart: Stewart, Stuart
- Vernou: Vernon

==== Greek given names ====
Some Greek names are anglicized using the etymologically related name: Agni: Agnes; Alexandros/Alexis: Alexander/Alex; Alexandra: Alexandra/Alex; Andreas: Andrew; Christophoros: Christopher; Evgenios/Evgenis: Eugene/Gene; Eleni: Helen; Georgios/Yorgos: George; Ioannis/Yannis: John; Irini: Irene; Katharini: Catherine/Kate; Markos: Mark; Michail/Michalis: Michael; Nikolaos: Nicholas; Pavlos: Paul; Petros: Peter; Stephanos: Stephen; Theodoros: Theodore/Ted; and so on.

Besides simple abbreviation or anglicisation of spelling, there are some conventional English versions of or nicknames for Greek names which were formerly widely used and are still encountered:

- Anestis: Ernest
- Alexandros: Alexander, Alex
- Apostolos: Paul
- Aristotelis: Aristotle
- Anastasia: Ana, Stasi, Stacey
- Andreas: Andrew
- Angeliki: Angela, Angel
- Athanasios: Thomas, Tom, Athan, Nathan
- Christos: Chris
- Demosthenes: Dick
- Despina: Dessi, Tessi, Tess
- Dimitrios/Dimi: James, Jim, Jimmy, Demi
- Dionysios: Dennis, Dean
- Haralambos: Harry, Bob
- Harilaos: Charles, Harry
- Eleftherios/Lefteris: Terence, Terry
- Eleftheria: Elli, Terrie
- Eleni: Helen, Elaine
- Evgenia: Eugenia
- Gavriil: Gabriel, Gabe
- Georgios, Yiorgos: George
- Ilias: Louie, Elias, Lou, Louis
- Konstantinos/Kostas: Gus, Charles, Dean, Constantine
- Leonidas: Leo
- Maria: Mary, Marie
- Michail: Michael, Mike
- Michaella: Michelle
- Nikolaos: Nicholas, Nick
- Panayiotis: Peter, Pete (cf. Petros)
- Pavlos: Paul
- Stavros: Steve
- Vasilios: William, Bill; (etymologically correct but not preferred: Basil)

Hundreds of Spiritual Christian Doukhobors who migrated from Russia to Canada from 1899 to 1930, changed their surnames. Genealogist Jonathan Kalmakoff posted comprehensive lists for

- Alberta (1935–1975)
- British Columbia (1936–1975)
- Saskatchewan (1917–1975)

==== Russian surnames ====
Many descendants of Spiritual Christians from Russia in California, whose parents immigrated to Los Angeles (1904–1912), hid their family surnames due to real and perceived ethnic discrimination during the Cold War. Examples include:

- Androff, Veronin: Andrews
- Baklanov: Bakly
- Bolderoff: Bolder
- Pivovaroff: Brewer
- Chernikoff: Cherney, Cheney
- Arinin, Orloff: Eagles
- Carpoff: Karp
- Volkoff: Wolf

==== German surnames ====
German Americans are the second largest ethnic group in the USA numbering at almost 16 million of US population. with an additional 29 million with some German ancestry. Immigration from Germany can be traced back to 1608 (Jamestown, VA), but migration was highest between the mid 19th century and early 20th century. From 1876 to 1923, Germany was the largest source of US Immigrants. From 1923 to 1970, it was the 2nd largest source of US Immigrants after Italy.

A formal immigration process channeling immigrants through Ellis Island only began in 1892. Immigrants arriving prior to this, did not receive official immigration papers documenting their names. This created a fluidity in how families chose to spell their names.

Legal problems caused by spelling variations in surnames were addressed by the Land Purchases Act. This established the principle of idem sonans, that is, if differently spelled names "sounded the same," a claim of an unbroken line of ownership could be acknowledged. Since preserving the name's sound was legally important, common forms of surname changes involved spelling adaptations that helped English readers replicate the original German pronunciation.

The First and Second World Wars created pockets of xenophobia against German Americans. During the same period, the Anti-Saloon League successfully lobbied the Government to enact prohibition, using racist "us vs them" propaganda against German Americans, who owned a large percentage of American breweries.

During the window of anti-German hostilities in the US, some German Americans chose to blur their connections with their ancestral homeland, by translating part or whole of their surnames into English. Once again, translations that limited change in sound were preferred over those that sounded different. Relative to the sustained German mass immigration during the 19th and early 20th century, this practice of surname translation was unusual and not very widespread.

In the 1940s, automobile registration documents, along with widespread implementation of social security, played an important role in stabilizing American surnames by legally documenting most of the US population's names.

- Becker: Baker, Beck
- Bennink: Benning
- Bresler, Bressler: Presley
- Braum, Braun: Brown
- Fischer: Fisher
- Freedman, Freedmann, Friedman, Friedmann: Freeman
- Gaetz: Gates
- Grandt: Grant
- Jensen, Jenssens: Johnson
- Koch: Cook
- Langstraat, Langstrath, Langstrasse, Langestraet: Longstreet
- Müller, Mueller: Miller
- Nauman, Naumann, Neuman, Neumann, Nieman, Niemann, Numan, Numann: Newman
- Nielsen, Nilsen: Nelson
- Pieters, Pieterse: Peters
- Pietersen, Pieterssen: Peterson
- Rodberts: Roberts
- Presler, Pressler: Presley
- Schmid, Schmidl, Schmidt, Schmitt, Schmitz: Smith
- Schreiber : Shriver
- Schweigert, Siewert, Steier, Steiert, Steiger, Steuer, Steuert, Stewert, Zweigert: Stewart, Stuart
- Stadler, Stetler: Statler
- Sten, Stein, Steinn, Steiner: Stone
- Wachter, Watcher, Welker, Welcker: Walker
- Weber: Weaver, Webb, Webster
- Werner, Werhner: Warner
- Wilhelms, Wilhelmson: Williams, Williamson, Wilson

==== Italian surnames ====
Italian surnames were often anglicized in the United States: for example, the i-ending of a number of Italian names becomes y, e, or ie.

- Amici: Ameche
- Barbieri: Barber
- Benetti, Benedetto: Benedict, Bennett, Benning
- Bevilacqua: Drinkwater
- Bianco: White
- Bonfiglio: Bonfield
- Borgnino: Borgnine
- Brucceleri: Brooklier
- Canadeo: Kennedy
- Castiglia: Costello
- Cestaro: Chester
- Cilibrizzi: Celebrezze
- Cipulli: Cipully
- Crocetti: Crockett
- Cucco, Cuoco: Cook
- DeCesare: Chase
- DeMarti, DeMartina, DeMartini, DeMartino: Martin
- Marti, Martina, Martini, Martino: Martin
- Mercante: Merchant
- Morillo: Morill
- Pace: Pace same spelling different pronunciation
- Perri: Perry
- Piccolo: Little
- Rossellini: Russell
- Rossi: Ross
- Sangiovanni: St. John
- Saraceni: Sarazen
- Scalice, Scalise: Scalise, Scalish
- Scornavacca, Scornavacco: Scarnavack
- Scotta, Scotti, Scotto: Scott
- Ta(g)liaferro: Tolliver, Toliver
- Trafficante: Traficant
- Valentino: Valentine
- Vinciguerra: Winwar

==== Dutch surnames ====
When Dutch immigrants arrived in the United States, often their names were changed. This was either done deliberately, to make the name easier to write and remember, or by accident because the clerk did not know how to spell the name and wrote it down phonetically.

- Aalderink: Aaldering, Aldering
- Bennink: Benning
- Buiel: Boyle
- Damkot: Damcott
- de Jong: Dejong, DeYoung, Young
- Dijkstra: Dykstra
- Filips: Philips, Phillips
- Gerritszoon, Gerritzoon, Gerritsen, Gerardson: Garrison
- Glieuwen: Glewen
- Goudswaard: Houseworth
- Griffoen: Griffin
- Hoed: Hood
- Janszoon, Janssens: Johnson
- Kempink: Camping
- Konings: King
- Kuiper: Cooper
- Langstraat, Langestraet: Longstreet
- Meester: Master
- Nieuwenhuis, Nijenhuis: Newhouse
- Nielsen, Nielzoon: Nelson
- Nieman, Niemann: Newman
- Piek: Pike
- Pieters, Pieterse: Peters
- Pietersen, Pieterssen, Pieterszoon: Peterson
- Smid: Smith
- Spaak: Spock
- Steyaert, Stuywaert, Styaert: Stewart, Stuart
- Van Cruijningen: Cunningham
- Veenhuis: Feenhouse
- Welhuis, Welhuizen: Wellhouse, Willhouse
- Zutphen: Sutphin

==== Swedish surnames ====
Swedish surnames were anglicised in the United States, such as converting -sson to -son.

- Andersson: Anderson
- Björk: Birch
- Carlsson: Carlson
- Eklund: Oakgrove
- Ekström: Oakstream
- Engström: Meadowstream
- Geirsson, Gerhardsen: Garrison
- Jacobsson: Jacobson
- Kalsberg: Colesberry
- Níelsson, Njálsson, Nielsen, Nilssen, Nilsson: Nelson
- Sjöberg: Seaberry
- Svensson: Swanson
- Wikström: Baygrove

=== Colonization by English-speaking countries ===
==== North America ====
===== Coastal Salish =====
Coastal Salish people were often given "Boston names" by early European settlers. These English names often had similar sounds to original Lushootseed names.

When Lushootseed names were integrated into English, they were often recorded and pronounced very differently. An example of this is Chief Seattle. The name Seattle is an anglicisation of the modern Duwamish conventional spelling Si'ahl, equivalent to the modern Lushootseed spelling siʔaɫ Salishan pronunciation: [ˈsiʔaːɬ]. He is also known as Sealth, Seathle, Seathl, or See-ahth.

== See also ==
- Anglicisation
- Albanization of names
- Azerbaijanization of names
- Hebraization of names
- Latinisation of names

== Bibliography ==
- H. L. Mencken, The American Language, 2nd edition, 1921, Chapter X, part 2. full text
- H. L. Mencken, The American Language, 4th edition, 1936, pp. 510–525.
- H. L. Mencken, The American Language, Supplement Two, 1948, pp. 516–525.
