= Garrison (name) =

Garrison is an English surname and given name derived from "son of Gerard", and the surname was brought from the patronymic name Gerhardsen during the Viking Invasion. The name is not related to the word "garrison". Notable people with the name include:

== Surname ==
- Ben Garrison (born 1957), American right-wing political cartoonist
- Carol Garrison (born 1952), President of the University of Alabama at Birmingham from 2002 to 2012
- Christian Garrison (1942–2020), American crime writer
- Cindy Garrison (born 1972), outdoors guide
- C. K. Garrison, entrepreneur and Mayor of San Francisco (1853–54)
- David Garrison (born 1952), American actor
- Don Garrison (1925–2018), American lawyer and politician
- Eve Garrison, (1903–2003), American artist
- Greg Garrison (musician) (born 1974), American musician.
- Fielding Hudson Garrison (1870–1935), American scholar of the history of medicine
- Ford Garrison (1915–2001), Major League Baseball outfielder
- Gary Garrison (born 1944), American professional football player
- Harriet E. Garrison (1848–1930), American physician, writer
- Jason Garrison (born 1984), Canadian professional ice hockey player
- Jennifer Garrison (born 1962), American politician from Ohio
- Jim Garrison (1921–1992), Louisiana district attorney, investigator of John F. Kennedy assassination
- Jimmy Garrison (1933–1976), American jazz double bassist
- Matthew Garrison (born 1970), American jazz electric bassist
- Lane Garrison (born 1980), American actor
- Len Garrison (1943–2003), Black British educationalist and historian
- Lindley Miller Garrison (1864–1932), US Secretary of War under President Woodrow Wilson
- Orestes Garrison (1813–1874), American politician
- Roger Garrison (born 1944), American economist
- Sean Garrison (1937–2018), American actor
- Sidney Clarence Garrison (1885–1945), American educator and psychologist.
- T. Ed Garrison, Jr. (1922–2013), American farmer and politician
- Theodosia Garrison (1874–1944), American poet
- Vermont Garrison (1915–1994), United States Air Force officer
- Walt Garrison (1944–2023), former National Football League player
- Wendell Phillips Garrison (1840–1907), American editor and author.
- William Lloyd Garrison (1805–1879), American abolitionist leader
- William F. Garrison, United States Army major general
- William Garrison (geographer) (1924–2015), American civil engineer and geographer
- Vivian Garrison (1933–2013), American applied medical anthropologist
- Zina Garrison (born 1963), former professional tennis player

== Given name ==
- Garrison Brooks (born 1999), American basketball player
- Garrison Hearst (born 1971), American football running back
- Garrison Keillor (born 1942), American author and radio host of A Prairie Home Companion
- Garrison Sanborn (born 1985), American football long snapper
- Garrison W. Wynn (born 1961), American motivational speaker

== Fictional characters ==
- C.J. Garrison, on the soap opera The Bold and the Beautiful
- Clarke Garrison, on The Bold and the Beautiful
- Herbert Garrison, aka Mr./Mrs. Garrison, teacher from the television program South Park
- Garrison Kane, in the Marvel Comics universe
