= 2015 Team Roompot season =

Team Roompot
- 2015 season
- UCI code: ROO
- Status: UCI Professional Continental
- Manager: Erik Breukink
- Main sponsor(s): Roompot Vakanties & Orange Peloton
- Based: Netherlands
- Bicycles: Isaac

Season victories
- One-day races: 2
- Stage race overall: -
- Stage race stages: 1

The 2015 season for Team Roompot began in January at the Trofeo Santanyi-Ses Salines-Campos. Team Roompot is a Dutch-registered UCI Professional Continental cycling team that participated in road bicycle racing events on the UCI Continental Circuits and when selected as a wildcard to UCI ProTour events.

Team Roompot's beginnings came in the spring of 2014, when Erik Breukink, who was formerly the manager of the Dutch team Rabobank, announced that he was seeking to create a new Dutch squad to ride at the UCI Professional Continental level. There were Dutch teams riding at UCI World Tour and UCI Continental levels, but none in the middle tier of professional cycling. Breukink announced his hope that the team would support the development of young Dutch riders. Other people involved in the development of the team included Michael Boogerd, Jean-Paul van Poppel and Michael Zijlaard.

While the team was under development, it was known as Orange Cycling in reference to the national colour of the Netherlands. The team sought sponsorship from several companies, but most prominently from Roompot Vakanties. Another Dutch team, WorldTour team Belkin Pro Cycling, were also seeking a new title sponsor and were seen as in direct competition with Orange Cycling for the Roompot sponsorship.

On 13 August 2014, it was announced that Roompot had decided to sponsor the Orange Cycling project, apparently in part because the intention only to sign Dutch riders matched Roompot's marketing strategy. The following day, the team announced its first rider, Johnny Hoogerland, who had previously ridden for another Dutch team, Vacansoleil–DCM.

== Roster ==
As of 19 February 2015.

Rider	Date of birth
Jesper Asselman (NED)	March 12, 1990 (age 35)
Marc de Maar (NED)	February 15, 1984 (age 41)
Berden de Vries (NED)	March 10, 1989 (age 36)
Huub Duyn (NED)	September 1, 1984 (age 41)
Dylan Groenewegen (NED)	June 21, 1993 (age 32)
Reinier Honig (NED)	October 28, 1983 (age 42)
Johnny Hoogerland (NED)	May 13, 1983 (age 42)
Tim Kerkhof (NED)	November 13, 1993 (age 32)
Michel Kreder (NED)	August 15, 1987 (age 38)

Rider	Date of birth
Raymond Kreder (NED)	November 26, 1989 (age 36)
Wesley Kreder (NED)	November 4, 1990 (age 35)
Maurits Lammertink (NED)	August 31, 1990 (age 35)
André Looij (NED)	May 25, 1995 (age 30)
Ivar Slik (NED)	May 27, 1993 (age 32)
Mike Terpstra (NED)	April 24, 1987 (age 38)
Etienne van Empel (NED)	April 14, 1994 (age 31)
Sjoerd van Ginneken (NED)	November 6, 1992 (age 33)
Brian van Goethem (NED)	April 16, 1991 (age 34)

Riders who joined the team for the 2015 season

Rider	2014 team
Jesper Asselman	neo-pro (Metec-TKH)
Marc de Maar	UnitedHealthcare
Berden de Vries	neo-pro (Jo Piels)
Huub Duyn	De Rijke-Shanks
Dylan Groenewegen	neo-pro (De Rijke-Shanks)
Reinier Honig	Vorarlberg
Johnny Hoogerland	Androni Giocattoli–Venezuela
Tim Kerkhof	neo-pro (Etixx)
Michel Kreder	Wanty–Groupe Gobert
Raymond Kreder	Garmin–Sharp
Wesley Kreder	Wanty–Groupe Gobert
Maurits Lammertink	Jo Piels
André Looij	neo-pro (Rabobank Development)
Ivar Slik	neo-pro (Rabobank Development)
Mike Terpstra	neo-pro (Croford)
Etienne van Empel	neo-pro (Rabobank Development)
Sjoerd van Ginneken	neo-pro (Metec-TKH)
Brian van Goethem	neo-pro (Metec-TKH)

== Season victories ==
Date	Race	Competition	Rider	Country	Location
8 March	Driedaagse van West-Vlaanderen, Sprints classification	UCI Europe Tour	Tim Kerkhof (NED)	Belgium	
21 August	Tour du Limousin, Stage 4	UCI Europe Tour	Maurits Lammertink (NED)	France	Limoges
21 August	Arnhem–Veenendaal Classic	UCI Europe Tour	Dylan Groenewegen (NED)	Netherlands	Veenendaal
5 September	Brussels Cycling Classic	UCI Europe Tour	Dylan Groenewegen (NED)	Belgium	Brussels
