= Eklund =

Eklund is a Swedish surname.

== Geographical distribution ==
As of 2014, 57.3% of all known bearers of the surname Eklund were residents of Sweden (frequency 1:641), 22.2% of the United States (1:60,735), 13.1% of Finland (1:1,564), 1.9% of Norway (1:10,024), 1.7% of Canada (1:79,135) and 1.0% of Denmark (1:20,451).

In Sweden, the frequency of the surname was higher than national average (1:641) in the following counties:

1. Uppsala County (1:304)
2. Västmanland County (1:354)
3. Västerbotten County (1:369)
4. Gävleborg County (1:415)
5. Södermanland County (1:457)
6. Örebro County (1:482)
7. Gotland County (1:483)
8. Dalarna County (1:485)
9. Östergötland County (1:549)
10. Norrbotten County (1:578)
11. Stockholm County (1:609)

In Finland, the frequency of the surname was higher than national average (1:1,564) in the following regions:

1. Åland (1:210)
2. Ostrobothnia (1:343)
3. Uusimaa (1:972)
4. Southwest Finland (1:1,030)

== People ==
- Anders Eklund (1957–2010), Swedish boxer
- Anders Eklund (murderer) (born 1965), Swedish murderer and rapist
- Bengt Eklund (1925–1998), Swedish actor
- Brian Eklund (born 1980), American professional ice hockey goalie
- Carl R. Eklund (1909–1972), American specialist in ornithology and geographic research in polar regions
- Christian Eklund (born 1977), Swedish professional ice hockey player
- Dicky Eklund (born 1957), American welterweight boxer
- Ella Eklund (1894–1953), Swedish diver
- Ernst Eklund (actor) (1882–1971), Swedish actor
- Ernst Eklund (diver) (1894–1952), Swedish diver
- Fredrik Eklund (born 1977), New York City real estate broker
- Gordon Eklund (born 1945), American science fiction author
- Greg Eklund (born 1970), drummer for the American rock band Everclear
- Gunnar Eklund (1920–2010), Swedish Army lieutenant general
- Hans Eklund (born 1969), Swedish football manager and former football player
- Jakob Eklund (born 1962), Swedish actor
- John Eklund (disambiguation), multiple people
- Klas Eklund (born 1952), Swedish economist and writer
- Kristin Eklund (born 1979), Swedish artist who uses the stage name Naimi
- Matthias Eklund (born 1976), Swedish football striker
- Michael Eklund, Canadian actor
- Mikael Eklund (born 1981), Swedish footballer (defender)
- Niklas Eklund (1969–2025), Swedish trumpeter
- Oscar Eklund (born 1988), Swedish ice hockey player
- Pelle Eklund (born 1963), Swedish retired professional ice hockey center
- Per Eklund, (born 1946), Swedish Rally and Rallycross driver
- Per Eklund (fighter), Swedish mixed martial arts fighter
- Per Eklund (ice hockey) (born 1970), retired Swedish ice hockey player
- Per Eklund (born 1945), former EU Ambassador to Georgia 2006–2010
- Ray Eklund, American head coach of the University of Kentucky's basketball team
- Sigge Eklund (born 1974), Swedish novelist, blogger and web designer
- Sigvard Eklund (1911–2000), director of the International Atomic Energy Agency security council
- Torolf Eklund (1912–2000), Finnish aircraft designer
- Victor Eklund (born 2006), Swedish ice hockey player
- William Eklund (born 2002), Swedish professional ice hockey player

== See also ==
- Eklund Islands, group of islands near the southwest end of George VI Sound towards the south of the Antarctic Peninsula
- Eklund TE-1, Finnish-built single seat flying boat of the late 1940s
