= Etienne van Empel =

Dutch cyclist (born 1994)

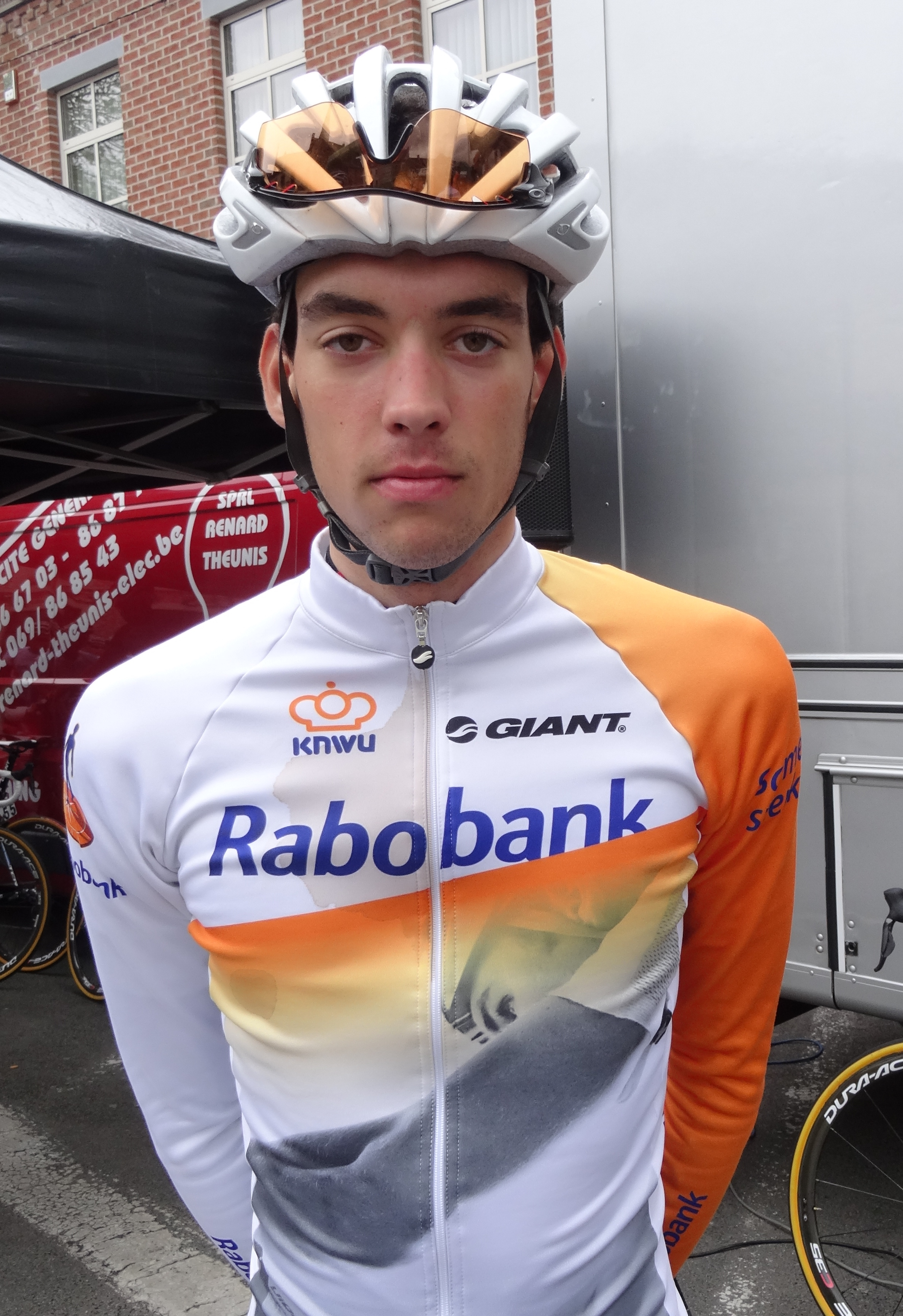
- Van Empel in 2014

Personal information
- Full name: Etienne van Empel
- Born: 14 April 1994 (age 32) Tricht, Netherlands
- Height: 1.86 m (6 ft 1 in)
- Weight: 64 kg (141 lb)

Cycling career
- Sport: Cycling
- Discipline: Road
- Role: Rider

Professional teams
- 2013–2014: Rabobank Development Team
- 2015–2018: Team Roompot
- 2019–2021: Neri Sottoli–Selle Italia–KTM
- 2022: China Glory Continental Cycling Team
- 2023–2024: Team Corratec

Etienne van Empel (born 14 April 1994) is a Dutch cyclist, who last rode for UCI ProTeam Team Corratec–Vini Fantini. In October 2020, he was named in the startlist for the 2020 Giro d'Italia.

== Major results ==
2014
10th Hadeland GP
2016
9th Druivenkoers Overijse
2017
5th Ronde van Limburg
2019
2nd Overall Tour of Albania
3rd Overall Tour de Taiwan
2022
2nd 11e Kasteelronde van Mill

=== Grand Tour general classification results timeline ===
Grand Tour	2020
Giro d'Italia	88
Tour de France	—
Vuelta a España	—

Legend
—	Did not compete
DNF	Did not finish
