= Conrad M. Arensberg =

American anthropologist

Conrad Maynadier Arensberg (September 12, 1910 – February 10, 1997) was an American anthropologist and scholar.

He was born in Wilkinsburg, Pennsylvania. He graduated summa cum laude from Harvard College in 1931. He was exempted from his final exams by the College Dean who viewed them as "being completely unnecessary in Conrad's case" (Comitas 2000). In 1937, his doctorate dissertation titled The Irish Countryman became a college textbook.

Arensberg helped found The Society for Applied Anthropology and was elected its President (1945–1946) as well as President of the American Anthropological Association (1980). In 1957, he co-analyzed economies of ancient empires in Trade Markets in the Early Empires together with Karl Polanyi.

In 1984, Owen Lynch, a former student of Arensberg organized a festschrift for his mentor, titled Culture and Community in Europe. In 1991, he received the Society of Applied Anthropology's Malinowski Award.

He was married to Vivian E. Garrison.

He held the Joseph L. Buttenwieser Professorship of Human Relations at Columbia University from 1970 until his retirement in 1980. Thereafter, he joined the faculty of the Joint Applied Anthropology Program at Teachers' College.

== Selected publications ==
- Arensberg, Conrad M.(1959) The Irish countryman : an anthropological study. Arensberg (Conrad Maynadier), 1910-1997. Gloucester, Mass., P. Smith
