= Ekström =

Ekström is a surname of Swedish origin. The name commonly appears as Ekström in Sweden and Finland and as Ekstrom in English-speaking countries. Notable people with the surname include:

- Anders Ekström (born 1981), Swedish sailor
- Anne-Marie Ekström (born 1947), Swedish politician
- Bernhard Ekström (1890–1956), Swedish politician
- Clarence Ekstrom (1902–1986), United States Navy admiral
- Folke Ekström, Swedish chess player
- Hans Ekström (born 1958), Swedish politician
- Jan Ekström, Swedish footballer
- Jan Ekström (author), Swedish author and adman
- Johnny Ekström, Swedish footballer
- Martin Eugen Ekström (1887–1954), Swedish military adventurer
- Mary Ekstrom, American politician
- Mattias Ekström, Swedish racing driver
- Mike Ekstrom, American baseball player
- Per Ekström, Swedish landscape painter
- Peter Ekström, Swedish sprint canoeist
- Pirkko Irmeli Ekström, Finnish chess master
- Roland Ekström (born 1956), Swedish and Swiss chess master
- Peggy Lee (1920–2002), American singer, née Norma Deloris Egstrom (originally Ekström)

== See also ==
- Ekstrom Ice Shelf, an ice shelf on Princess Martha Coast of Queen Maud Land in Antarctica
- William F. Ekstrom Library, main branch of the University of Louisville Libraries system in Kentucky
