= Dijkstra =

Origin
- Language: West Frisian
- Meaning: Signified that the family either lived close to a dijk or came from a place with the element "-dijk" in its name
- Region of origin: Netherlands

Other names
- Variant forms: Dykstra, Terpstra, Dijkema, van Dijk, van Dyke

Dijkstra (pronounced [ˈdɛikstraː] or [ˈdikstraː]) is a Dutch family name of West Frisian origin. It most commonly refers to:

- Edsger W. Dijkstra (1930–2002), Dutch computer scientist
  - Named after him: Dijkstra's algorithm, Dijkstra Prize, Dijkstra–Scholten algorithm

== People ==
- Bram Dijkstra (born 1938), American professor of English literature and cultural historian
- Edsger W. Dijkstra (1930–2002), Dutch computer scientist, programmer, software engineer, mathematician, and science essayist
- Elijah Dijkstra (born 2006), Dutch footballer
- Erik Dijkstra (born 1977), Dutch journalist and television presenter
- Jan Dijkstra (1910–1993), Dutch mayor
- Jesse Six Dijkstra (born 1994), Dutch politician
- Johan Dijkstra (1896–1978), Dutch painter, illustrator and stained glass artist
- Lenie Dijkstra (born 1967), Dutch racing cyclist
- Lou Dijkstra (1909–1964), Dutch speed skater, father of Sjoukje Dijkstra
- Margaret Dijkstra, pseudonym of Eva Gerlach (born 1948), Dutch poet
- Marjolein Dijkstra (born 1967), Dutch physicist
- Mart Dijkstra (born 1990), Dutch footballer
- Meindert Dijkstra (born 1967), Dutch footballer
- Peter Dijkstra (born 1978), Dutch choir conductor
- Pia Dijkstra (born 1954), Dutch politician and television presenter
- Remco Dijkstra (born 1972), Dutch politician
- Rineke Dijkstra (born 1959), Dutch photographer
- Sieb Dijkstra (born 1966), Dutch football goalkeeper
- Sjoukje Dijkstra (1942–2024), Dutch figure skater
- Wieke Dijkstra (born 1984), Dutch field hockey player

== Fictional characters ==
- Roel Dijkstra, eponymous character in a comic book series published from 1977 to 1995
- Sigismund Dijkstra, character from Andrzej Sapkowski's The Witcher saga and the third Witcher game

== See also ==
- Dykstra, surname
