= Owen Lynch =

American anthropologist

Owen M. Lynch (January 4, 1931 – April 26, 2013) was an American anthropologist who specialised in the people of India, with particular interest in those now referred to as Dalits, who were previously known as untouchables.

== Life ==
Owen Lynch was born on January 4, 1931, in Flushing, Queens, New York City, to a working-class Roman Catholic family of Irish descent. The second of four children, his pre-university education was in Jesuit institutions and ended with a short spell studying theology at a seminary. He then enrolled for a BA degree at Fordham University, which was awarded in 1956, before moving to Columbia University for postgraduate study. He was a student of Conrad M. Arensberg at Columbia and later, in 1984, organised the festschrift produced for his former mentor, titled Culture and Community in Europe.

Between 1962 and 1964, Lynch conducted fieldwork in Madhya Pradesh, India, studying the Munda languages with special reference to the Nihali/Nahali subset. Further fieldwork researching the Jatav dalit people of Agra in 1964 was followed by the award in 1966 of a PhD in anthropology by Columbia This latter study, which inspired in him a deep and abiding interest in Buddhism and the impact of B. R. Ambedkar as a dalit icon, formed the basis for his first book, The Politics of Untouchability, published in 1969.

Armed with his PhD, Lynch became an assistant professor at the Binghamton campus of State University of New York, holding the post from 1966 until his promotion to associate professor in 1969. Also in 1966, he became a Seminar Associate at Columbia University Seminars and remained so for the next 20 years.

Having conducted fieldwork among squatters in the slums of Dharavi in Bombay (now Mumbai) during 1970–1971, Lynch was appointed Charles F. Noyes Professor of Urban Anthropology at New York University (NYU) in 1974 and continued in that role until 2003.

Lynch was also a Senior Research Associate at the South Asian Institute of Columbia University, 1978–1984. For some of that time, between 1980 and 1982, he did further fieldwork in India, on this occasion studying pilgrimage and the Chaube Brahmin people of Mathura, Uttar Pradesh.

Further periods of fieldwork in India were undertaken by Lynch between 1988 and 1989, when he looked into the Radhavallabhi sect in Brindaban, Uttar Pradesh, and between 1994 and 1995, when he returned to Agra for further study of the dalits there.

Lynch, who held numerous roles with professional organisations during his academic career, retired from NYU as professor emeritus in 2003 and died, unmarried and childless but with many appreciative nieces and nephews, on April 26, 2013, in Boston, Massachusetts. His last research was published in the previous year.

== Legacy ==
Lynch's research and fieldwork papers are held by the National Anthropological Archives. In 2014, the Indian Social Science Association presented its inaugural Professor Owen M. Lynch Memorial Award.

== Works ==
Among Lynch's many publications are:

- The Politics of Untouchability (1969), Columbia University Press
- "Pilgrimage with Krishna, Sovereign of the Emotions" (July 1988), Contributions to Indian Sociology 22(2) doi:10.1177/006996688022002003
- Divine Passions: The Social Construction of Emotion in India (1992), University of California Press ISBN 978-0520066472 (Editor)
- "Urban Anthropology, Postmodernist Cities, and Perspectives" (June 1994), City & Society 7(1) doi:10.1525/ciso.1994.7.1.35
- "Untouchables in India's Civil/Uncivil Democracy. A Review Article" (2001), Ethnos: Journal of Anthropology 66(2) doi:10.1080/00141840120070967
