= Leo Segedin =

American painter (1927–2025)

Leopold Segedin
- Born: March 22, 1927; Chicago, Illinois, U.S.
- Died: January 7, 2025 (aged 97)
- Education: University of Illinois Urbana-Champaign
- Known for: Painting, Drawing
- Style: Representational, Social realist
- Spouse: Janis Segedin (née Steinberg) (m. 1959; d. 2005)
- Website: leopoldsegedin.com

Leopold Segedin (March 22, 1927 – January 7, 2025) was an American artist and educator based in Chicago. He is best known as an urban figurative painter, who portrayed humanist scenes of life in mid-20th century Chicago. He exhibited for over 70 years, including retrospectives at the Chicago Cultural Center, University Club of Chicago, University of Illinois, and Northeastern Illinois University, and major group shows at the Art Institute of Chicago, Milwaukee Institute of Art & Design, Illinois State Museum and Des Moines Art Center, among others. His art has received awards from the Art Institute of Chicago, Terry Art Institute, Corcoran Gallery of Art (juried by George Grosz), and American Jewish Arts Club. Segedin was one of Art in America’s 1956 "New Talent in the U.S.A." artists and has been featured in The Washington Post, Chicago Tribune, The Philadelphia Inquirer, Chicago Daily News, and Chicago Sun-Times, among many publications. Chicago Tribune critic Alan Artner characterized Segedin's work as a "distinguished example" of magic realism; in visual terms, critics have often noted his vivid color, dynamic illusionist space, and rendering of light and surfaces that portray the passage of time.

Segedin was an educator, most notably at Northeastern Illinois University, where he taught for over three decades. He was also a prolific essay writer and public lecturer, and was a frequent panelist, exhibition juror, and active participant in Chicago's art community as a member of the Chicago Society of Artists and American Jewish Art Club (president, one term), and as co-founder and president of Chicago's first post-war, artist-run cooperative gallery, Exhibit A.

Leopold Segedin, Sax Man, oil on panel, 48" x 17", 1952.

== Life and career ==
Born in Chicago's West Side on March 22, 1927, Segedin showed an early aptitude for drawing that was encouraged with classes at the School of the Art Institute. After graduating from Crane Technical High School, he attended the University of Illinois Urbana-Champaign, intending to go into chemical or aeronautical engineering. A self-described "Eureka!" moment his junior year, however, convinced him to choose art (BFA, 1948; MFA 1950). In 1952, Segedin began military service and taught drafting at the U.S. Army Engineer School at Fort Belvoir, Virginia until 1954. He continued to paint—in a studio above a bowling alley—and exhibit, winning prizes in shows at the Art Institute of Art of Chicago (AIC), Terry Art Institute in Miami, and Corcoran Gallery. Upon returning to Chicago, he decided to teach for a living, initially at a high school, before settling at Northeastern Illinois University (NEIU), where he served until retiring as Art Professor Emeritus in 1987, in order to paint full-time.

Segedin exhibited widely, appearing in the AIC's "60th Annual National Exhibition" (1952), seven of its annual "Chicago and Vicinity" shows, and a United States Information Traveling Exhibition (1957–9). In 1956, Art in America selected him as one of 36 artists in its annual "New Talent in the U.S.A." survey. In subsequent decades, he exhibited at the Des Moines Art Center, Evanston Art Center, and Hyde Park Art Center and showed at the Balzekas Museum of Lithuanian Culture and Loyola University as part of a group called the "5," and at the Byron Roche Gallery in Chicago (five solo shows, 1997–2009). The Chicago Cultural Center (1994), University Club of Chicago (2000), and NEIU (2010) each recognized him with retrospectives. Segedin was one of eleven influential Illinois artists recognized the Illinois State Museum's "Luminous Ground: Artists with Histories" (2011), and was in the Muskegon Museum of Art's "Moments of Grace: New Regional Painting" (1999–2000). He is included in Harvest of Freedom: A Survey of Jewish Artists in America (1989) by Louise Dunn Yochim.

Segedin was married to his wife, Jan (née Steinberg), for over 45 years, until her death in 2005. He credited her as the "great support," that kept him on the "straight and narrow" path as an artist. They had two children, twins Benjamin and Paul, in 1962. Segedin pursued diverse cultural interests throughout his life: writing, lecturing, an ongoing monthly discussion group, and membership in a theater performance group spanning five decades. His painting Hey Kid (1988) inspired Michael Smith's song of the same title, as well as Segedin's inclusion as a character alongside legendary artists, in the painting-inspired folk revue, Hello Dali: From the Sublime to the Surreal (1998). Reviewing the revue's staging at Chicago's Victory Gardens Theater, Chicago Sun-Times theater critic Hedy Weiss called Segedin's "haunting vision" of Chicago streets "the great revelation of the show."

Leopold Segedin, Elevated Station, oil on panel, 48" x 36", 1956.

Segedin worked well into his 90s and was at work on a new painting at the time of his death. He died on January 7, 2025, at the age of 97.

== Work ==
Segedin was a humanist representational painter, depicting life amid Chicago's storied elevated ("L") trains, brick storefronts, schoolyards, alleyways and cobblestone streets, often glimpsed from two-flat back porches and transit platforms. Journalist Richard Cahan writes, "Chicago is in Leo Segedin's blood… [he] paints like Studs Terkel writes. In Chicagoese." Discussing his work, Segedin says, "[My] paintings are about loss, about loneliness, about search. They are about the loss of a loved one, and also the loss of all those people who were part of my life, even those I never knew […] As I look back on my life—my work—what strikes me is how fast time passes, the temporary, fragile quality of all life." Segedin was influenced by the 1930s legacy of social commitment and commentary—artists such as Ben Shahn, Hyman Bloom and Jack Levine—and German expressionists like George Grosz and Otto Dix. His work speaks to the human condition on subjects ranging from the Holocaust to war and imperialism to growing up and aging.

Leopold Segedin, Polifiction: Hanging Man, craypas on paper, 22" x 17.5", 1968.

Leopold Segedin, Hey Kid I, mixed media on panel, 12" x 16" 1988.

In his first two decades (1947–1966), Segedin favored cityscapes and people—heads, portraits, and scenes of city dwellers, musicians and religious figures. His style ranged from realistic to expressionist, as in Sax Man (1952), which featured rich, jewel-toned color, gestural brushwork, and an elongated figure with a convincing likeness. He sometimes flirted with abstraction, particularly in cityscapes (such as Elevated Station, 1959), that critics noted for their effectively flat, linear compositions and patterning. Chicago Tribune editor Edward Barry remarked on Segedin's ability to arouse "strong nostalgic emotion" in depictions of decaying, 19th-century buildings, such as Ruins (1952), which was also recognized by the Art Institute of Chicago.

For a decade beginning in 1967, Segedin, in his words, "got hung up on social issues." The expressionist paintings and craypa drawings of his "Babel" series (1967) viewed the dehumanization of the Vietnam War through the lens of the Holocaust. His "Polifiction" works (1968–9) addressed the temporality of power and humanity's inability to communicate in vivid images like Hanging Man (1968), depicting figures suspended from wheel spokes in chandelier or carousel fashion, set in convention-like settings, which referenced the infamous 1968 Democratic Convention in Chicago. The "Body Count" (1970), "Body Parts" (1971–2), and "Permutations" (1976–9) series contrasted acid-colored, amorphous bodies and body parts with banal props like balloons, ribbons, and mechanical elements to represent the depersonalization that political order can visit on humanity. Curators and critics described them as humanist "inner and outer landscapes," "beautiful, lurid, and frightful," and disturbing canvasses whose "searing colors and eerie, decadent light pit order against organism."

Leopold Segedin, Games, oil on canvas, 65" x 46" 2015.

In the 1980s, Segedin returned to the cityscapes of his early life and work, in paintings and drawings of Chicago building facades, interiors, "L" platforms, and rush-hour crowds. By 1987, he began to focus on single or paired figures—often youthful self-portraits—exploring coming-of-age themes, such as play and fantasy (Pilots, 1989 or the later "Games" series, 2015–6, see right) or peril (Hey Kid I and II, 1988 and 1989). His "Hide and Seek" works (2003–6) considered both, using the game as an existential metaphor for one's public versus private self, and the desire to know the true nature of others. Alan Artner described these works of "magic realism" as meticulously rendered and naturalistic, with an intensity of mood and color, whose "force comes from a strangeness based on past time and its modes of life."

Segedin's style has continued to evolve in his seventh and eighth decades of work, with new elements, such as pencil and ink detailing or wallpaper patterns, and new themes, such as aging, which he explored wistfully in L Station (Three Ages) (2002), in celebratory fashion in the "Old Men Dancing" series (2008–10), and more soberly in his extensive, ongoing series of self-portraits (2012–8), such as Self-Portrait (2017).

Leopold Segedin, Self-Portrait, mixed media on panel, 12" x 12", 2017.

== Exhibit A Gallery ==
In 1957, Segedin, along with twenty-three other artists—eventually including Morris Barazani, Fred Berger, Eve Garrison, Lucille Leighton, Tristan Meinecke, Dolores Nelson, Victor Perlmutter, Frank Peterson, and Joan Taxay-Weinger—co-founded Exhibit A, the first post-war, artist-run cooperative gallery in Chicago. Segedin served as the gallery's first president. The gallery stands out as a pioneer of the cooperative concept—unique at the time—and served as a model for others that sprung up in Chicago in the 1970s. According to the group, they opened in response to the lack of exhibition opportunities in Chicago, at a time when only four professional galleries (of a total of six) exhibited local artists' work. Exhibit A attracted notice in the local press, due to the unprecedented nature of the undertaking—artists taking over the operation and business management of a gallery—and the quality and diversity of the work. The Chicago Tribune’s Edith Weigle wrote their shows "were always worth a visit" for their presentation of a cross-section of contemporary art currents. The gallery closed when its building at 47 E. Pearson St. was torn down in 1959. In 2013, the Chicago Cultural Center held a reunion exhibit to acknowledge Exhibit A's contribution to post-WWII art in Chicago.

== Career as educator ==
Segedin was an educator for nearly forty years, beginning with an assistantship (1948–50) at the University of Illinois Urbana-Champaign during graduate school. While in the military, he taught drafting at the U.S. Army Engineer School at Fort Belvoir (1952–54). After a stint teaching high school, he was hired in 1955 to start and head the art department at a branch of Chicago Teachers College that later became Northeastern Illinois University (NEIU). He served at NEIU until retiring as Art Professor Emeritus in 1987. Segedin also taught at the Horwich JCC and the Evanston Art Center.

In addition to his academic career, Segedin was a prolific essayist and lecturer. His essays, which number over fifty, explore diverse topics including: "Realism and Neo-Realism in Art", Holocaust Paintings, interdisciplinary studies, Jewish art, African art, Picasso's Guernica, the art of Henry Darger, artists and aging, visual thinking, and race, gender and ethnicity in the artworld, among others. He has delivered lectures on subjects including Marshall McLuhan, bipolar disorder and art, and painting as information, among others. In 2017, at age 90, he delivered "Making/Teaching Art: The Dangers of Teaching Art" as the keynote address to the Colorado Art Education Association's Fall Conference.
