= Terpstra =

Terpstra is a Dutch surname of Frisian origin, which is a topographic name for a person who lived on a terp, a prehistoric man-made mound built on low-lying land as a habitation site. Notable people with this surname include:

- Anne Terpstra (born 1991), Dutch cross-country cyclist
- Erica Terpstra (born 1943), Dutch politician
- John Terpstra, Canadian poet
- Julius Terpstra (born 1989), Dutch politician
- Mike Terpstra (born 1963), American basketball coach
- Mike Terpstra (cyclist) (born 1987), Dutch cyclist
- Niki Terpstra (born 1984), Dutch cyclist
- Sonja Terpstra, Australian politician
- Vern Terpstra (1927–2013), American business theorist
