= Derussification =

Process of displacement of Russian culture

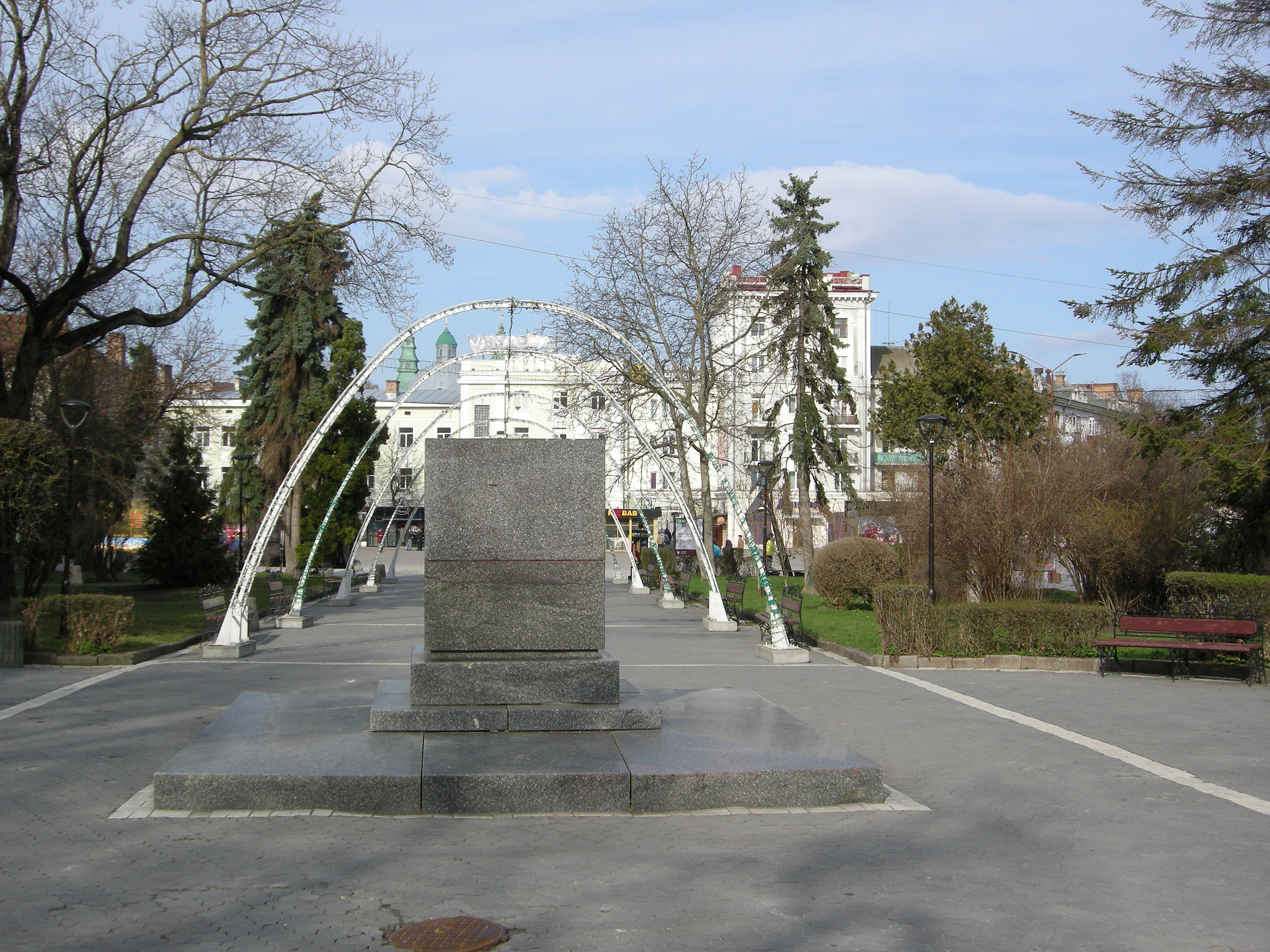
The empty plinth of a statue dedicated to Alexander Pushkin in Ternopil, Ukraine

Derussification (or derussianization) is a process or public policy in different states of the former Russian Empire and the Soviet Union or certain parts of them, aimed at restoring national identity of indigenous peoples: their language, culture and historical memory, lost due to Russification. The term may also refer to the marginalization of the Russian language, culture and other attributes of the Russian-speaking society through the promotion of other, usually autochthonous, languages and cultures.

== After the collapse of the Russian Empire ==
Early derussification processes manifested themselves in the newly independent states that emerged after the collapse of the Russian Empire in 1917, such as Poland, Finland, Belarus, Ukraine, Georgia, and the Baltic states.

=== Kars ===
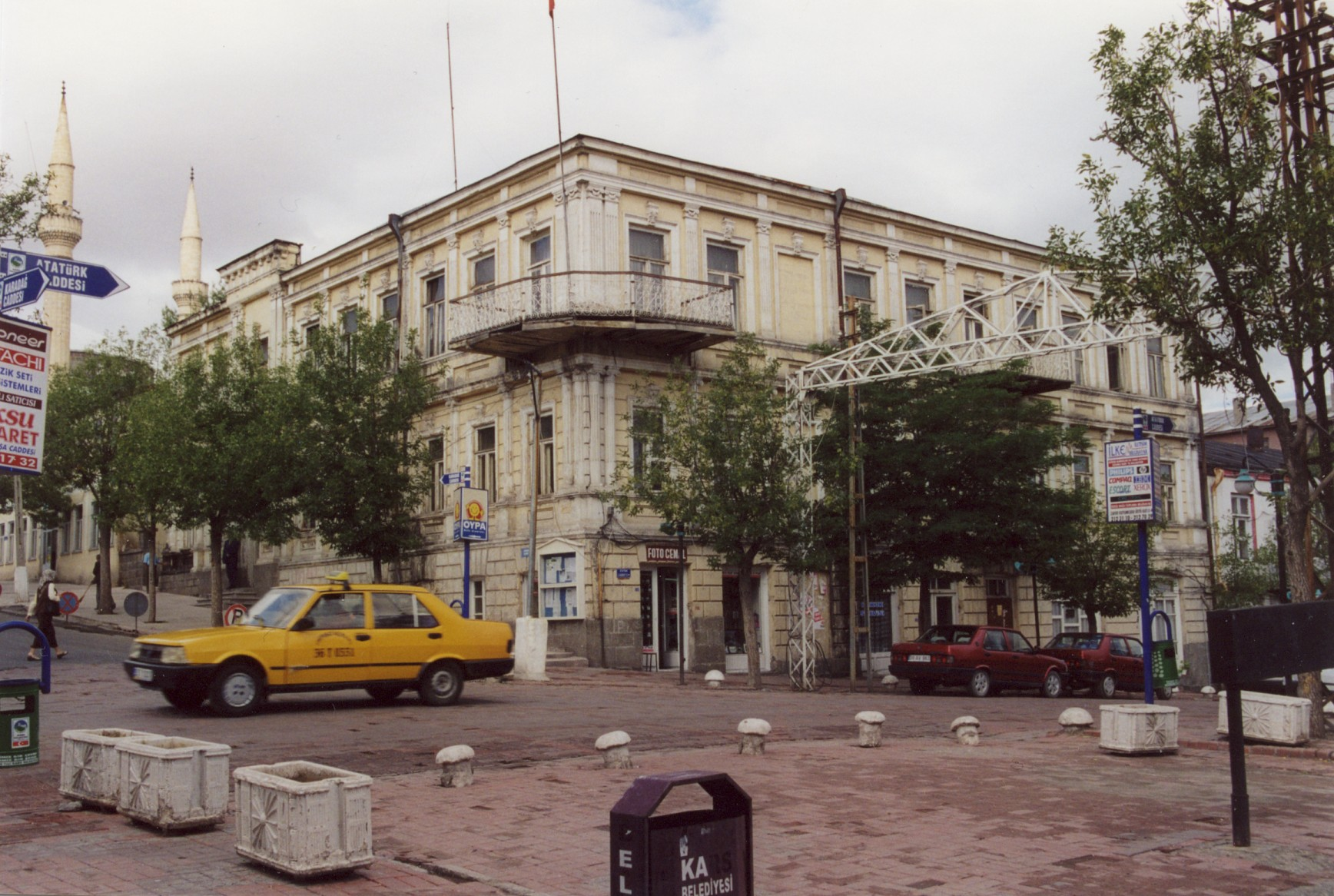
The former Russian presence in Kars is indicated by remaining buildings of typical Russian architecture of the late 19th–early 20th century.

After the Treaty of Moscow (1921) transferred the Kars Oblast and a number of adjacent territories to Turkey, almost all Christians, who made up 47% of the population according to the 1897 census, left these territories. The share of Slavs in the region, which at that time was 10.6% of the population (including 7.7% of Russians proper), dropped to a few thousand Spiritual Christians from Russia, most of whom returned to the Soviet Union in the mid-1920s and mid-1960s. The Greek, Armenian and Georgian communities ceased to exist.

=== Harbin Russians ===
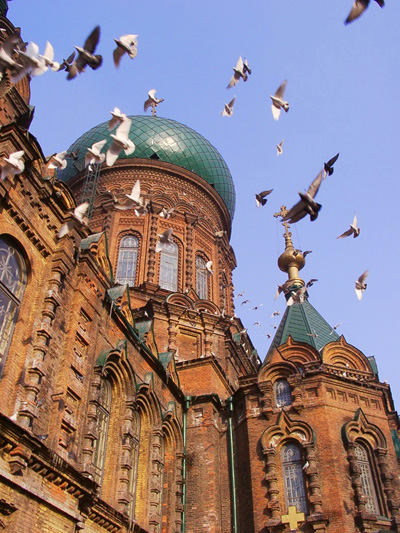
Saint Sophia Cathedral of the Russian Orthodox Church (built in 1907), as a remainder of Russian influence in Harbin.

In the period between 1945 and 1969, the derussification of Harbin ended, which at the peak of White emigration during the 1920s had an almost 300,000 Russian-speaking population in Northeast China. Most of the remaining Russian residents chose to migrate to the United States, Australia, or returned to the USSR.

== In the Soviet Union ==
Korenizatsiia was an early policy of the Soviet government for the integration of non-Russian nationalities into the governments of their specific Soviet republics. In the 1920s, the policy promoted representatives of the titular nation, and their national minorities, into the lower administrative levels of the local government, bureaucracy, and nomenklatura of their Soviet republics. The main idea of the korenizatsiia was to grow communist cadres for every nationality. In Russian, the term korenizatsiia derives from korennoe naselenie (коренное население, "native population"). The policy practically ended in the mid-1930s with the deportations of various nationalities.

By the mid-1930s, with purges in some of the national areas, the policy of korenizatsiia took a new turn, and by the end of the 1930s the policy of promoting local languages began to be balanced by greater Russification. Moreover, Stalin seemed set on greatly reducing the number of officially recognized nationalities by contracting the official list of nationalities in the 1939 census, compared with the 1926 census. The term korenizatsiia went out of use in the latter half of the 1930s, replaced by more bureaucratic expressions, such as "selection and placement of national cadres" (подбор и расстановка национальных кадров). From 1937, the central press started to praise Russian language and Russian culture. Mass campaigns were organized to denounce the "enemies of the people". "Bourgeois nationalists" were new enemies of the Russian people which had suppressed the Russian language. The policy of indigenization was abandoned. In the following years, the Russian language became a compulsory subject in all Soviet schools.

The pre-revolution Russian nationalism was also rehabilitated. Many of the heroes of Russian history were re-appropriated for glorification. The Russian people became the "elder brother" of the "Socialist family of nations". A new kind of patriotism, Soviet patriotism, was declared to mean a willingness to fight for the Socialist fatherland. In 1938, Russian became a mandatory subject of study in all non-Russian schools. In general, the cultural and linguistic russification reflected the overall centralization imposed by Stalin. The Cyrillic script was instituted for a number of Soviet languages, including the languages of Central Asia that in the late 1920s had been given Latin alphabets to replace Arabic ones.

During the Soviet era, a significant number of ethnic Russians and Ukrainians migrated to other Soviet republics, and many of them settled there. According to the last census in 1989, the Russian 'diaspora' in the Soviet republics had reached 25 million. Some historians evaluating the Soviet Union as a colonial empire, applied the "prison of nations" idea to the USSR. Thomas Winderl wrote "The USSR became in a certain sense more a prison-house of nations than the old Empire had ever been."

=== Sino-Soviet Split ===
After the Sino-Soviet split, the Chinese Ministry of Public Security and the State Bureau of Surveying and Mapping in 1963 issued the document "Notice on Requesting Investigation and Research on Issues Existing in Russian Place Names and Proposing Handling Opinions", demanded Heilongjiang Province to derussify place names within its jurisdiction. Subsequently, the Heilongjiang Provincial Department of Civil Affairs conducted studies and identified 20 Russian place names that were used in the past but now have Chinese names (mainly streets in Harbin, and islands on Amur River) and 9 place names without Chinese names; then sent a written report to Beijing on December 27, 1963, containing suggestions for renaming Russian place names, as well as a note that some place names needed further study. On December 26, 1964, the State Council of the People's Republic of China approved the proposal for the derussification of place names.

== After the collapse of the Soviet Union ==
In most of the Central Asian and Transcaucasian republics of the former Soviet Union, the share and size of the Russian population fell particularly rapidly due to mass emigration, natural decline, and a prolonged population explosion among indigenous peoples who began to increase their presence in Russia as migrant workers.

Thus, in Tajikistan during the first ten years of independence, the number of Russians decreased from 400,000 to 60,000. In 2010, the Russian language in the republic was deprived of the status of a language of interethnic communication. The rapid derussification of many other cities and regions of Kazakhstan and Central Asia continues.

For example, the share of the Russian population in Astana between 1989 and 2009 fell from 54.5% to 24.9%; in Almaty from 59.1% to 33.2%; in Bishkek from 55.8% to 26.1%.

=== Transition from the Cyrillic script ===
Since the collapse of the Soviet Union, the number of countries officially using the Cyrillic script shrank, which can also be considered a sign of derussification. The script ceased to be used in Azerbaijan, Moldova, Turkmenistan and partly in Uzbekistan. In Kazakhstan, a complete transition of the Kazakh language from Cyrillic to Latin is scheduled by 2025.

== By country ==
=== In Turkmenistan ===
All dedicated Russian-language schools were closed down, and their students sent to Turkmen schools across the country. The Turkmen government reduced Russian-language instruction to one hour a week, blocked most Russian-language media, and later curtailed access to Russian-language material in the national library.

=== In Kazakhstan ===
Kazakhstan used Latin letters from 1929 to 1940, after which the country switched to Cyrillic during a Stalinist reform. Before that, the Arabic script was used there.

On September 28, 2017, the Parliament of Kazakhstan held a hearing at which the draft of the new alphabet based on Latin was presented. The alphabet will consist of 25 characters. The project of the alphabet was presented by the director of the Coordination and Methodological Center of Language Development, Erbol Tleshev. According to him, the alphabet was compiled taking into account the language system of the Kazakh language and the opinions of experts. The Director of the Institute of Linguistics, Erden Kazybek, said that each letter of the alphabet will mean one sound and will not include additional graphic characters.

On October 27, 2017, president Nursultan Nazarbayev signed a decree on the translation of the Kazakh alphabet from Cyrillic to Latin. The document, published on October 27, envisages a gradual transition to Latin graphics by 2025. The decree also approved a new alphabet.

On February 26, 2018, during a meeting with the Minister of Information and Communications, Dauren Abayev, President of Kazakhstan Nursultan Nazarbayev ordered to translate the activities of the state authorities exclusively into the Kazakh language. This transition will take place in stages.

=== In Moldova ===
Moldova was annexed into the USSR as the Moldavian SSR following the Soviet-German Molotov–Ribbentrop Pact in 1940. Soon after, the language of the country was renamed from "Romanian" to "Moldavian" and it ceased being written in the Latin alphabet, changing to Cyrillic. This policy would only be reversed in 1989, after large demonstrations imbued with patriotic feeling. Romanian is an official language in the Constitution of Moldova since its independence, and it is Moldova's sole official language today. Russian is still in use but not as important as it was in the Soviet era, since it has no special status in the country and its usage as mother tongue has been declining for some time.

=== In Ukraine ===
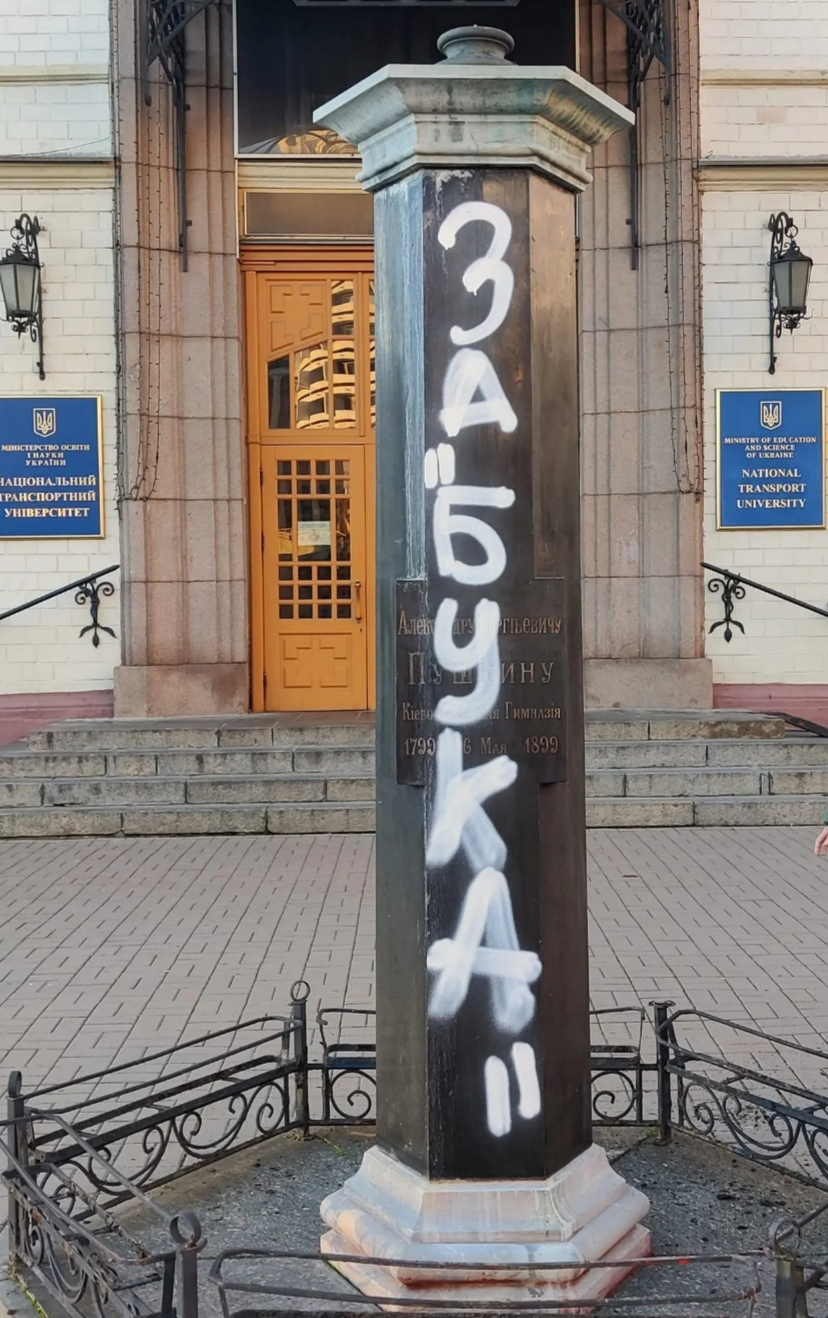
An empty pedestal after the removal of an Alexander Pushkin bust in Kyiv

Derussification in Ukraine began in the aftermath of the Collapse of the Soviet Union in 1991, when Ukraine became independent. However, in their first years after independence, decommunisation, and the creation of a free market capitalist economy took precedent. However, the processes of derussification and decommunisation are intimately linked, and some key steps were made spontaneously and unsystematically. As of 2022, the decommunisation process is largely complete within Ukraine, and so more energies have been devoted recently to derussification. This process was compounded and accelerated by the escalation in the Russo-Ukrainian War starting with the Russian invasion of Ukraine in February 2022.

Against the background of the invasion, de-Russification began in earnest in Ukraine. Street names were changed and Soviet-Russian monuments were demolished in villages and towns. Changes were made in Lviv, Dnipro, Kyiv and Kharkiv. In turn, Ivano-Frankivsk became the first city in Ukraine to be completely free of Russian names.

As of April 8, 2022, according to a poll by the sociological group Rating, 76% of Ukrainians support the initiative to rename streets and other objects whose names are associated with Russia or the Soviet Union.

On 21 April 2023, President Volodymyr Zelenskyy signed the Law of Ukraine "On Condemnation and Prohibition of Propaganda of Russian Imperial Policy in Ukraine and Decolonization of Toponymy". This law prohibits toponymy that symbolizes or glorifies Russia, individuals who carried out aggression against Ukraine (or another country), as well as totalitarian policies and practices related to the Russian Empire and the Soviet Union, including Ukrainians living in Russian-occupied territories.

=== In the Baltic states ===
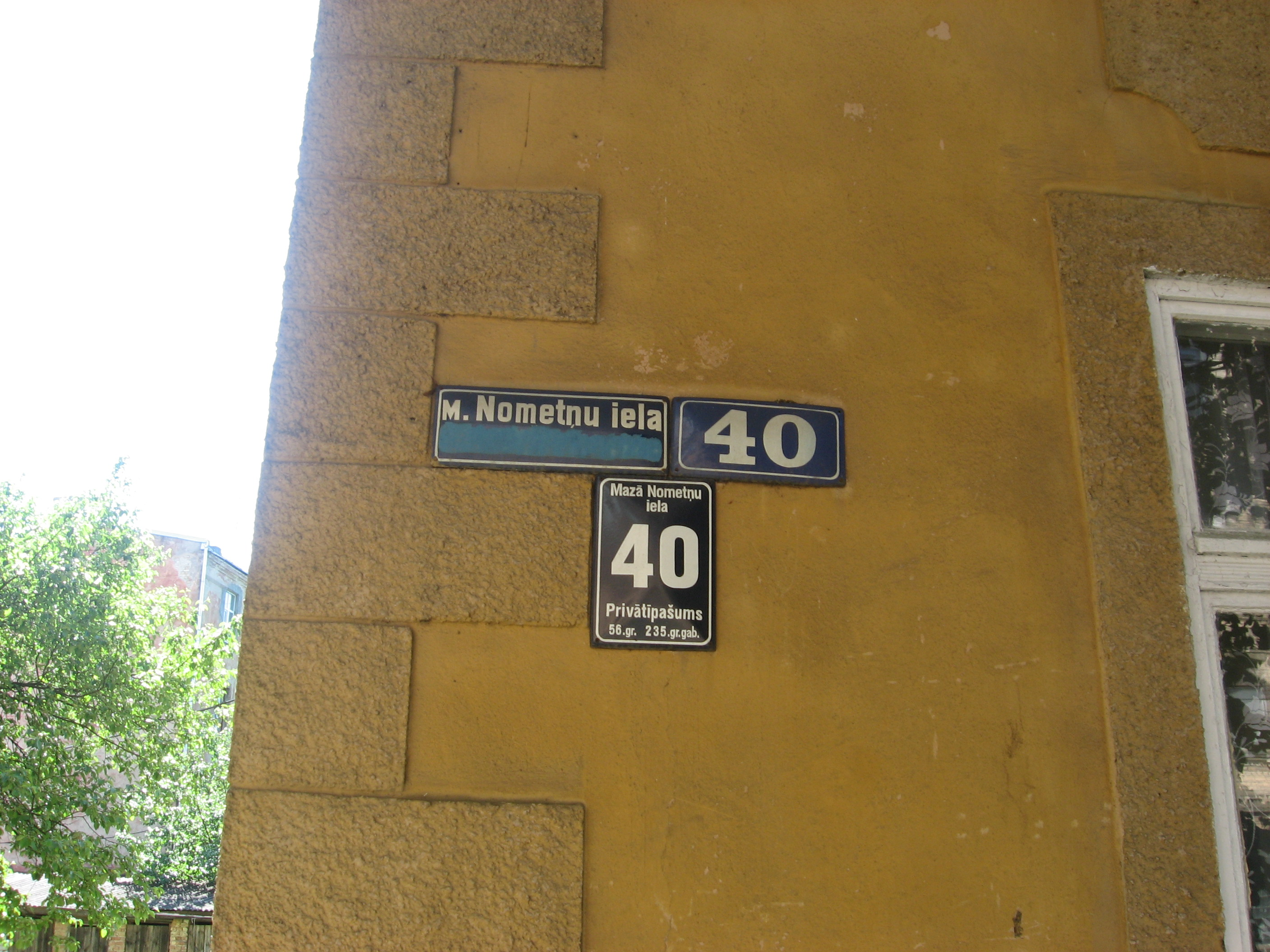
A Soviet era bilingual street name sign in Riga, Latvia with the Russian name painted over

The Baltic states (Lithuania, Latvia and Estonia) have undergone derussification since regaining independence from the Soviet Union in 1991. Occupation of the Baltic states resulted in a significant ethnic Russian minority, who, almost without exception, spoke only Russian. Derussification efforts began with switching the language of official business from Russian to the local Baltic and Finnic languages, and restoring traditional nationality and citizenship laws. In parallel with the situation in Ukraine, however, more effort was devoted to decommunization than to derussification in the early years of independence.

The Russian invasion of Ukraine accelerated derussification in the Baltic states. One change of note was the Latvian decision to convert all existing public schools to Latvian-only, beginning in September 2023. Lithuania and Estonia quickly followed suit. While policies have previously been in place to encourage the use of Latvian over Russian in education settings, these rules were inconsistently enforced and schools were not monitored. All public schools in Latvia will use Latvian as the language of education by September 2025.

== See also ==
- Azerbaijanization of surnames
- Demolition of monuments to Alexander Pushkin in Ukraine
- Demolition of monuments to Vladimir Lenin in Ukraine
- KyivNotKiev
- Russophobia
