= John Eklund =

John Eklund may refer to:

- John Eklund (Ohio politician) (fl. 1980s–2020s), Ohio state senator
- John Eklund Jr. (1951–2025), Wyoming state representative
- John Eklund (skier) (born 1993), Swedish freestyle skier
