= Dykstra =

Dykstra is a Frisian surname describes a person who lived by a dyke. The suffix "-stra" is derived from old Germanic -sater, meaning sitter or dweller.

The name originates in the northern Netherlands province of Friesland. The name was originally spelled "Dijkstra". The name was "Americanized" to Dykstra after Frisian settlers arrived and settled in the United States. Many immigrants bearing the Dykstra surname arrived in the United States between 1840 and 1900, well before the United States experienced "waves of immigration." Most Dykstras were farmers and all belonged to the Dutch Reformed, and later the Christian Reformed Church. Large waves of emigrants also migrated to Brazil, namely to the town of Carambei. The Dykstra/Dijkstra family was integral to the settlement of the area and for the introduction of modern farming practices.

Many Dykstras settled in Michigan, Illinois, Iowa, California, New York, and New Jersey. Many eventually grew away from farming and settled in cities like Grand Rapids, Michigan, Holland, Michigan, and Chicago, Illinois. They became a very successful bunch in businesses such as medicine, dentistry, waste management, banking, and architecture.

== People with the surname ==
- Allan Dykstra (born 1987), American baseball player
- B. D. Dykstra (1871–1955), American pastor, educator, and poet
- Chloe Dykstra (born 1988), American model, actress and cosplayer
- Clarence Addison Dykstra (1883–1950), American administrator
- John Dykstra (born 1947), American motion picture special effects artist
- John Dykstra (politician) (1875–1959), American state politician from Michigan
- Jordan Dykstra (born 1985), American composer
- Kenny Dykstra, stage name of Ken Doane (born 1986), American wrestler
- Lenny Dykstra (born 1963), American baseball player
- Rick Dykstra (born 1966), Canadian politician
- Russell Dykstra (born 1966), Australian actor
- Steve Dykstra (born 1962), Canadian ice hockey player
- Ted Dykstra (born 1961), Canadian playwright and actor

== See also ==
- Dijkstra, for a list of people with that surname
