= Albanization of names =

Albanization (US) or Albanisation (UK) of names is Albanization of non-Albanian personal names and toponyms in Albania, Kosovo, western North Macedonia and Montenegro. Right after the Second World War Albanian communist authorities required non-Albanians to Albanize their names. In 1966 the Albanian Communist Party issued a decree aimed to wipe out "traces of the non-Albanian population" in places where significant Slavic minorities still lived. In 1968 one of the demands of Albanian nationalistic demonstration on Kosovo was to remove Serbian Orthodox name Metohija from the name of the province. On 23 September 1975 the Albanian Communist Party issued "Decree #5339" on the Albanization of all place-names and personal names which ordered citizens to give "modern revolutionary (Illyrian) names" to their children, while non-Albanian toponyms or ones that had religious connotations all over the country were Albanized to better suit the "state ideology".

After the Kosovo War and the entrance of the NATO forces to Kosovo in June 1999 a sweeping Albanization of place-names, organizations, street-names and business took place. In 2005 a special envoy of UN Secretary-General, issued a report submitted to the UN Security Council inviting the Kosovo Albanian leaders to react and bring a halt to the attempts to rewrite the history through "albanization". The politicians in contemporary Albania continued to support the politics of Albanization, particularly Albanization of Slavic toponyms.

== In Albania ==
Soon after the Second World War people belonging to ethnic minorities were required to Albanize their names. The Central Committee of the Albanian Communist Party issued two decrees which Albanized place-names and personal names. The first decree was issued in 1966 aimed to wipe out "traces of the non-Albanian population" in places where significant Slavic minorities still lived. The 1966 Albanization of names included personal names of ethnic Macedonians and names of the villages where they lived in compact communities. A Decree on the Albanization of all place-names and personal names was also issued at 7th congress of the Communist Party held in period 26—29 May 1975. The decree referred to all names which are not aligned with ideological and political guideline of the Communist Party. This decree ordered citizens to give "modern revolutionary (Illyrian) names" to their children.

Tzachristos argues that Christian names were overwhelmingly affected while on the other hand, the use of several Muslim names was allowed in spite their religious connotations. However, French anthropologist Gilles de Rapper states that according to some observations the religious names survived better among Christians than among Muslims. Under the same decree geographical name changes occurred all over the country in cases of non-Albanian toponyms or ones that had religious connotations. Around 90 towns and toponyms in the southern areas where ethnic Greek communities are located were renamed and received secular names. The names of 13 settlements in Korçë and 6 in Sarandë regions were changed in order to be in agreement with the "state ideology". Moreover, the names of Greek and Roman archaeological sites were changed to "Illyrian".

A ban of religious names had deleterious consequences on people of Greek ethnicity who traditionally give religious names to their children.

In the case of Serbo-Montenegrin community in northern Albania (around Shkodër), their family names had been Albanized during dictatorship of Enver Hoxha.

The desire of the Greek minority's representatives to be able to use bilingual signposts and signs within municipalities is based on their need for recognition of Greek culture and, more importantly, a fear of its erosion. The December 2007 lawsuit against Omonoia President Vasil Bolano for replacing signs in Albanian with signs in Greek in the municipality of Himara illustrates the issues surrounding toponymy and its symbolic meaning. The situation was the exact counterpoint to the measures of Albanization of toponyms operated by the communist regime.

The politicians in contemporary Albania continued to support the politics of Albanization, particularly Albanization of Slavic toponyms. In 2009 Albanian president Bamir Topi and Prime Minister Sali Berisha proposed establishment of the commission for Albanization of Slavic toponomy. Berisha actually supports Albanization of not only Slavic toponyms but all placenames in Albania. In spite of his proposal, there are no similarly strong attempts to Albanize Latin, Turkish or Greek place names for the time being.

The Albanian civil service’s policy tends to Albanianize personal names to persons who belong to ethnic or cultural minorities without even asking them.

== In Kosovo ==
During the widespread demonstrations in Priština and several other towns on Kosovo in 1968, the Albanian nationalists demanded a change of name of the Serbia's province Kosovo and Metohija to Kosovo. They considered an Orthodox name of Metohija as provocative. Their demands were met and less than a month after demonstrations Yugoslav Federal Parliament removed Serbian name Metohija from the official name of the province.

After the Kosovo War and entrance of the NATO forces to Kosovo in June 1999 a sweeping Albanization of place-names, organizations, street-names and business took place. In some cases newly forged placenames (i.e. Burim, Besiana or Theranda) are not accepted instead of traditional names.

In 2003 UN Secretary-General reported that names of many non-Albanians were "Albanized" in official documents which include their identity cards. In the same report it is indicated that after becoming award of this activities in some cases UNMIK reissued documents with correct spelling of the name. The Minister for Kosovo in the Government of Serbia informed EULEX that the practice of Albanization of names of Serbs is unacceptable.

In 2005 Kai Eide, a special envoy of UN Secretary-General Kofi Annan, issued a report which was later submitted to the UN Security Council. In this report the Kosovo Albanian leaders are invited to react and bring a halt to the attempts to rewrite the history through "albanization".

Assembly of Kosovo adopted a Law on the Use of Languages which stipulated that non-Albanians have the right to receive all information, documents and other services in any of the Kosovo’s official languages. It was reported by UNHCR that Kosovo’s public companies do not respect this law when it comes to their non-Albanian customers, particularly Serbs, whose names are changed to Albanized versions with "ç". There is a common practice reported by Ombusdperson institution in 2008 which has serious long-term consequences when municipalities don't respect names in the Serbian, Bosniak and Turkish languages of newborn babies when they are recorded in the registry books.

== In North Macedonia ==
During Second World War western part of North Macedonia was annexed into fascist Albania. All Macedonian schools were replaced with Albanian while names and surnames of non-Albanian people had to take an Albanian form.
