= Upjohn (disambiguation) =

Upjohn was a pharmaceutical firm.

Upjohn, as a surname, is a patronymic name derived from the Welsh "ap Siôn" meaning "son of John". It may refer to:

== People ==
- Gerald Upjohn, Baron Upjohn (1903–1971), a soldier and judge
- Hobart Upjohn (1876–1949), an architect
- Ian Upjohn, barrister
- Richard M. Upjohn (1828–1903), architect
- Richard Upjohn Light (1902–1994), a neurosurgeon, aviator, cinematographer and geographer
- Richard Upjohn (1802–1878), an English-born architect
- William E. Upjohn (1853–1932), a medical doctor
- William George Dismore Upjohn (1888–1979), a surgeon

== Fictional characters ==
- Aubrey Upjohn, fictional character in the Jeeves novels by P. G. Wodehouse
- Mrs. Emily Upjohn, a character in the Marx Brothers' film A Day at the Races

== Other uses ==
- Upjohn Co. v. United States, 449 U.S. 383 (1981), a Supreme Court case
- Upjohn dihydroxylation, an organic reaction which converts an alkene to a cis vicinal diol
- Upjohn's Triangle of Health, a short-lived series of animated short films produced in late 1960s and again in late 1970s by The Walt Disney Company's educational media division
- W. E. Upjohn Institute for Employment Research, an American independent research organization based in Kalamazoo, Michigan
