= Tricht =

- Village
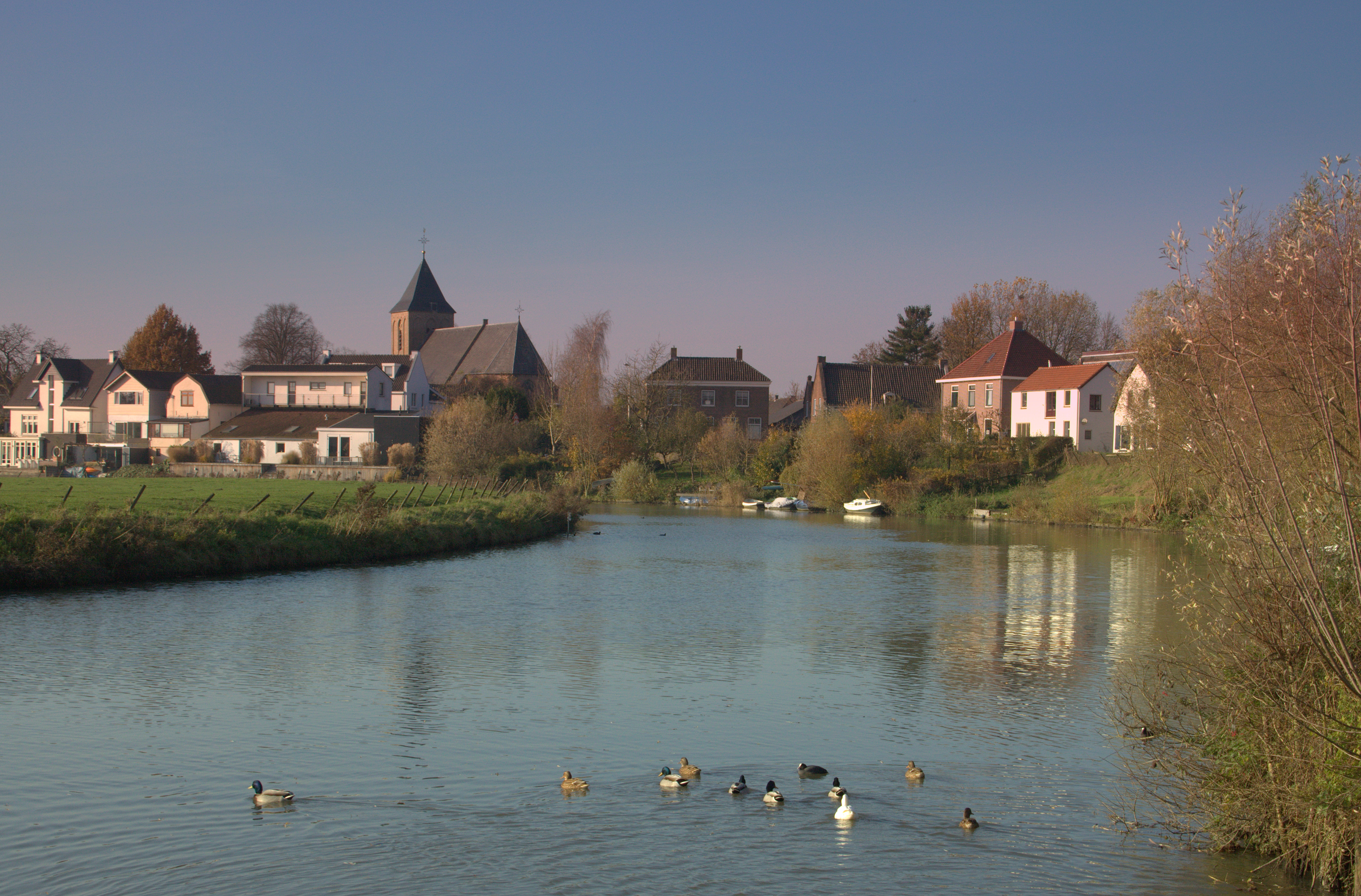
- View on Tricht

- Coat of arms

- Location in the Netherlands Tricht (Netherlands)
- Coordinates: 51°53′N 5°16′E
- Country: Netherlands
- Province: Gelderland
- Municipality: West Betuwe

Area
  - Total: 11.64 km^{2} (4.49 sq mi)
- Elevation: 4 m (13 ft)

Population (2021)
  - Total: 2,145
  - Density: 184.3/km^{2} (477.3/sq mi)
- Time zone: UTC+1 (CET)
  - Summer (DST): UTC+2 (CEST)
- Postal code: 4196
- Dialing code: 0345

Tricht is a village in the Dutch province of Gelderland. It is a part of the municipality of West Betuwe, and lies about 10 km west of Tiel.

== History ==
It was first mentioned in 1108 as Treth, and means ferry (Latin: traiectus). Two centres developed perpendicular to the dike on the Waal River. The tower of the Dutch Reformed Church dates from around 1400. The church itself is from the late 15th century. Crayestein is a medieval castle, however only the 17th century gate remains. An estate has built in its place in 1855. In 1840, Tricht was home to 768 people. In 1868, Tricht was cut in two by the railway line Utrecht-Den Bosch.

On 25 June 1967, Tricht was hit by a tornado, destroying part of the town and killing 5 of its inhabitants; 32 people were wounded. One-third of the Tricht population lost their homes.

== Gallery ==
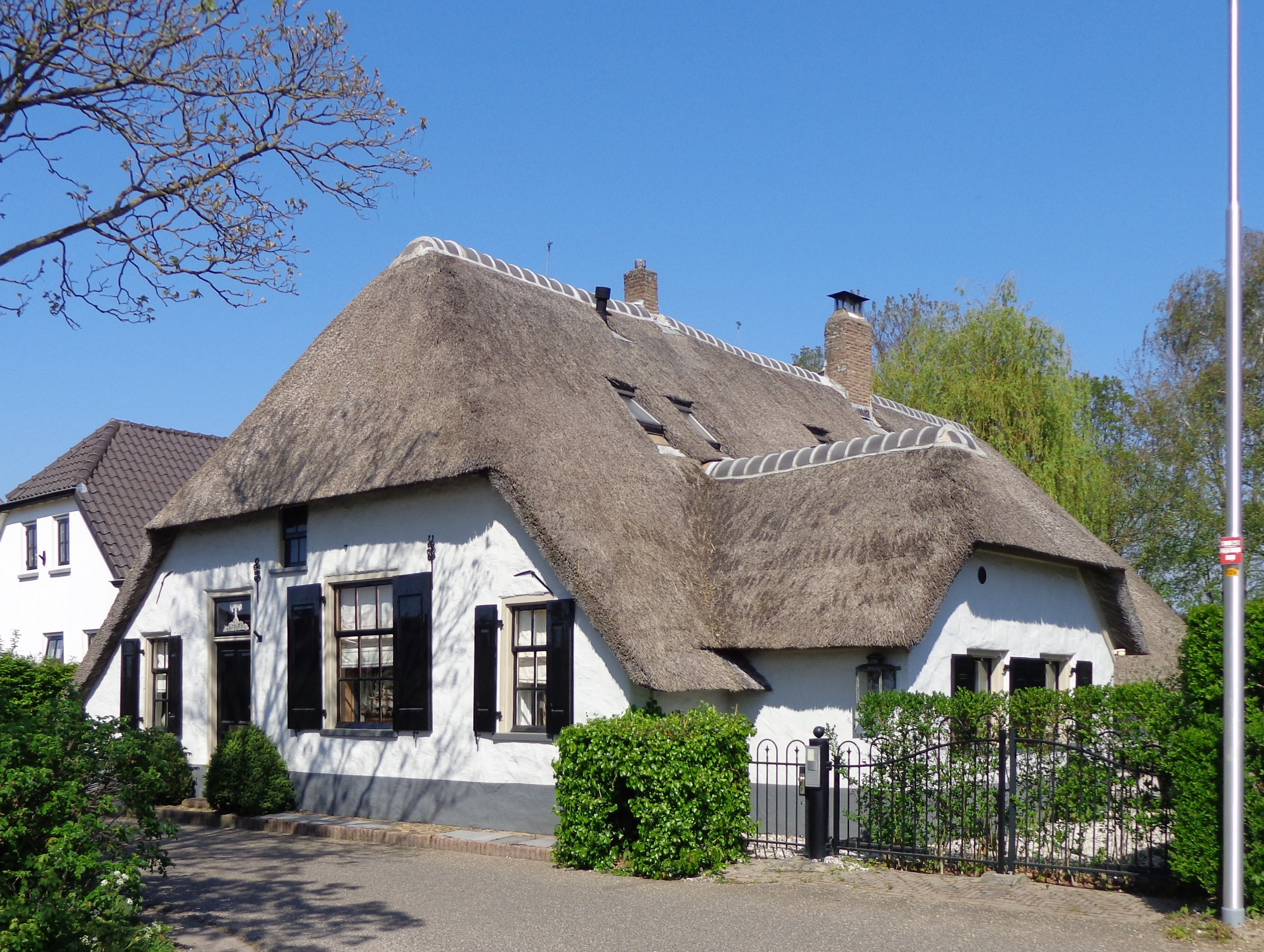
Farm in Tricht

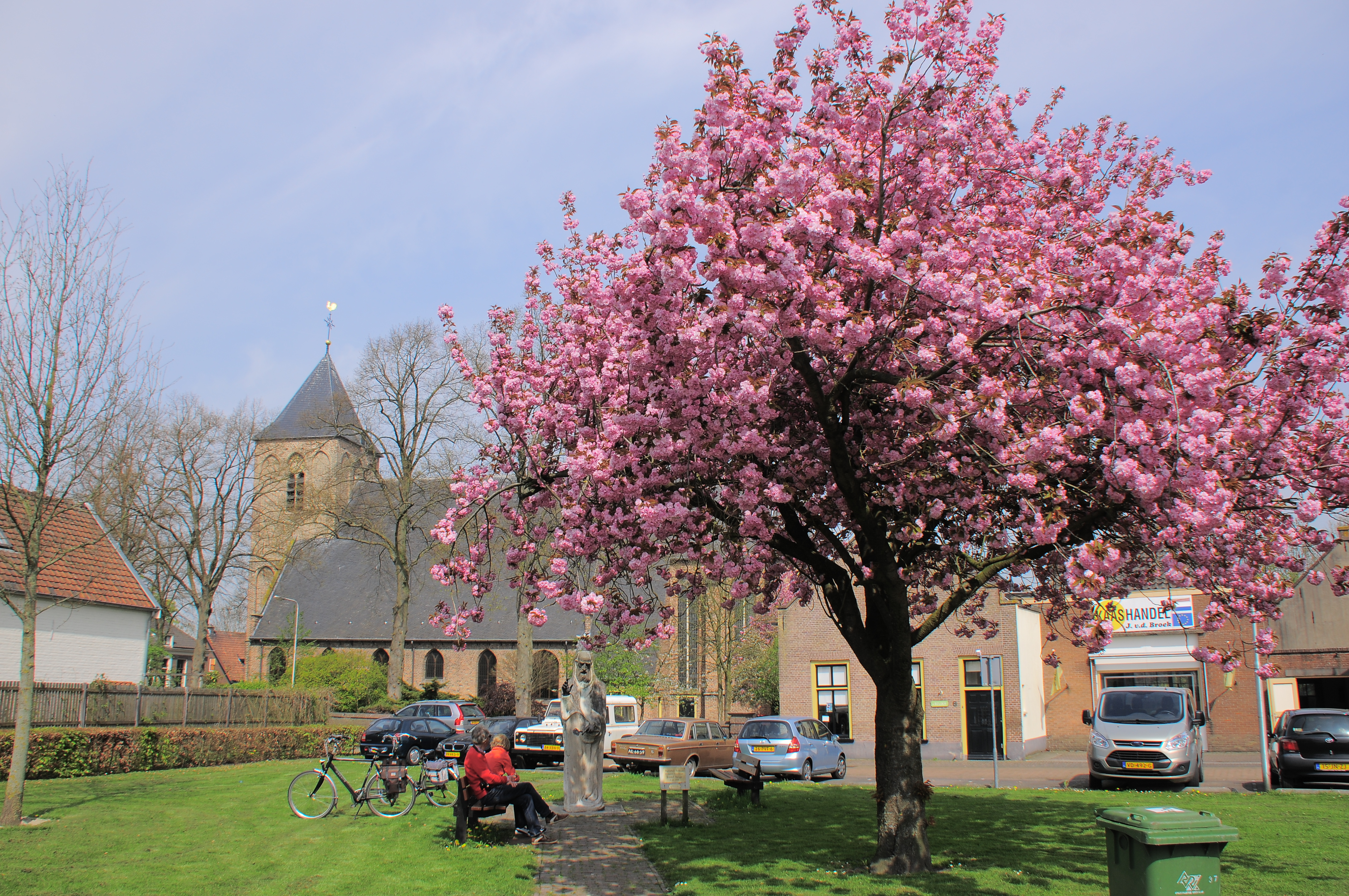
In bloom

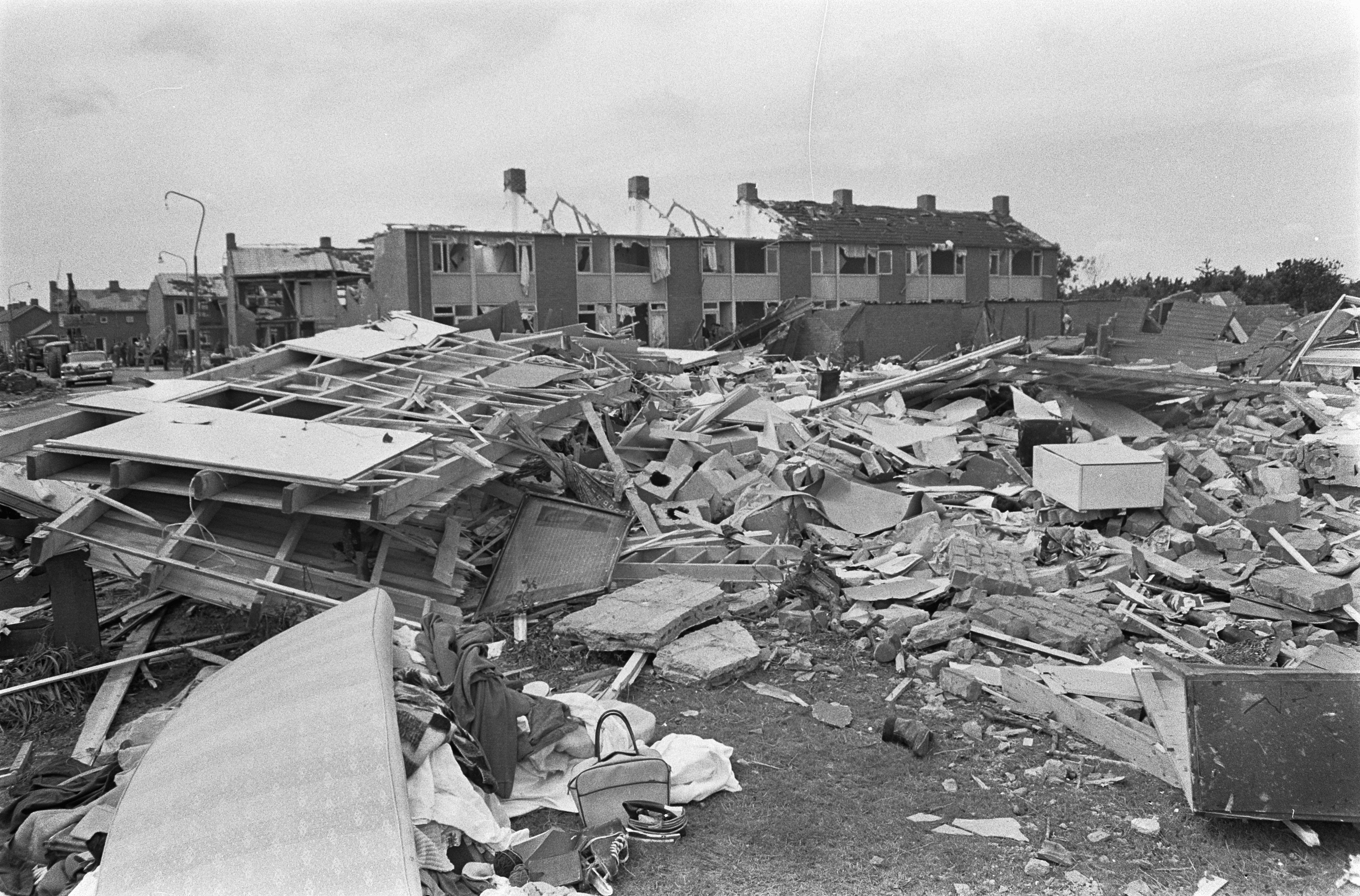
Aftermath of the tornado

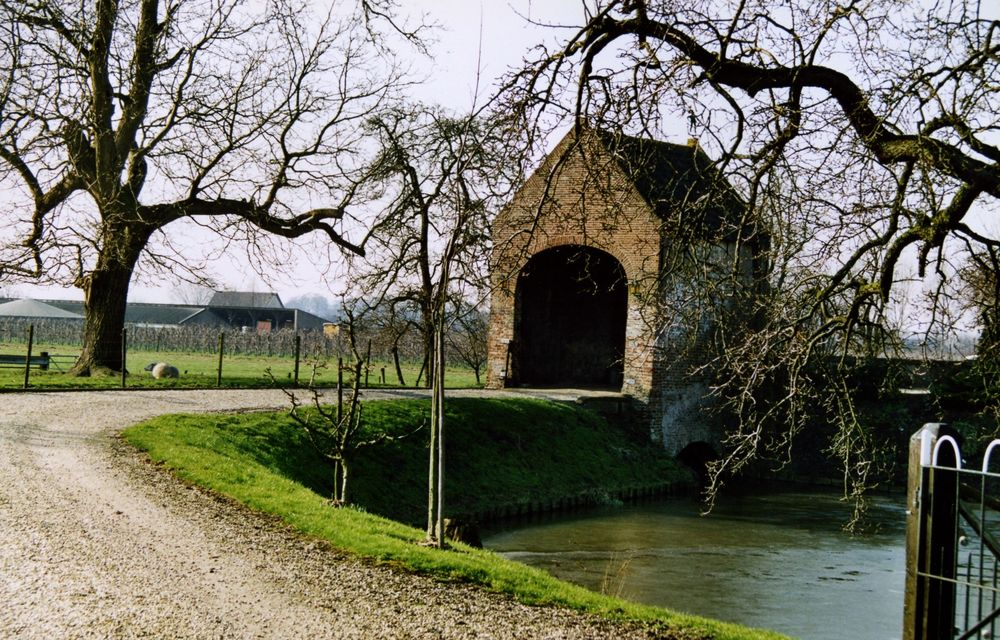
Gate to Crayestein
