= Theodosia Garrison =

American poet (1874-1944)

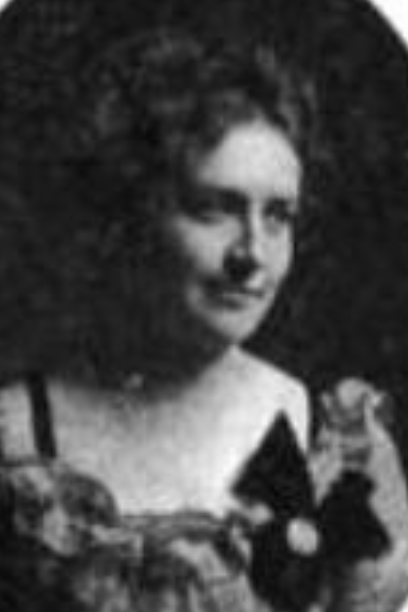
- Theodosia Garrison, from a 1901 publication
- Born: Theodosia Pickering; January 1, 1874; Newark, New Jersey, U.S.
- Died: October 9, 1944 (aged 70); Short Hills, New Jersey, U.S.
- Other name: Theodosia Faulks
- Occupation: Poet

Theodosia Pickering Garrison Faulks (January 1, 1874 – October 9, 1944) was an American poet, who published frequently in popular magazines from the 1890s into the 1920s.

== Early life ==
Pickering was born in Newark, New Jersey, the daughter of Silas Wright Pickering and Annie Bedell Pickering. She began writing poetry in childhood.

== Career ==
From the 1890s into the 1920s, Garrison published dozens of poems and stories in popular periodicals, including Harper's Magazine, Munsey's Magazine, Cosmopolitan, and The Smart Set. "People read it as an olive is eaten, something neither nourishing nor necessary," she told The New York Times in 1905, of magazine poetry, "just a flavor between the courses." Six of her poems were included in The Haunted Hour (1920), an anthology of spooky poetry edited by Margaret Widdemer.

In 1900, a one-act play by Linton Tedford, Hearts and Flowers, was based on a Garrison story, "The Eleventh Hour", without her permission. In 1905, an imposter claiming to be Garrison attended social events in Buffalo.

== Publications ==
- "October" and "A Rainy Day" (1899, Munsey's)
- "A Holiday" (1899, The New England Magazine)
- "A Petition" (1900, Scribner's)
- "A Song of Kamal" and "Let Me Forget" (1900, Cosmopolitan)
- "Loss" and "The Last Night" (1900, Munsey's)
- "The Changeling" and "Felicity" (1901, Munsey's)
- "Two Visions" (1901, Lippincott's)
- "In Hawthorne Time" and "The Lass That Loved a Sailor" (1901, National Magazine)
- "Remember!" (1902, National Magazine)
- "The Failure" (1903, story, Harper's)
- "The Daughter" (1907, McClure's)
- "The Call of Home" (1908, McClure's)
- The Joy o' Life and Other Poems (1908)
- The Earth Cry and Other Poems (1910)
- "The Neighbors" (1910, McClure's)
- "Friends" (1910)
- "The Laying of the Monster" (1910, story, Everybody's)
- "The Day of Reckoning" (1911, Cavalier)
- "Woman" (1912)
- "Sheila" (1917)
- "These Shall Prevail" (1917)
- "April 2nd" and "A Lesson in Manners" (1917, Fifes and Drums)
- The Dreamers and Other Poems (1917)
- Et in Arcadia Ego (1906, 1917)
- "The Windows" (1918, Poetry)
- "The Neighbors", "A Ballad of Hallowe'en", "Two Brothers" "The Child", "The Three Ghosts", and "The Victor" (1920)
- "The House in Order" (1920, Red Cross Magazine)
- As the Larks Rise (1921)
- "Friends in Fiction" (1921, Sewanee Review)
- "A Prayer for Children" (1924, Journal of Education)
- "A Litany" (1925, Friends' Intelligencer)
- "Melchior, Gaspar, Balthazar" (hymn)

== Personal life ==
Pickering married lawyer Joseph Garrison in 1898. He died in 1910. Her second husband was another lawyer, Frederic J. Faulks; they married in 1911. She died in 1944, at the age of 70, at her home in the Short Hills section of Millburn, New Jersey.
