= Azerbaijanization of surnames =

Name changes in Azerbaijan

Azerbaijanization of surnames is a derussification policy pursued after the independence of Azerbaijan. According to the decision of the Milli Majlis in 1993, common slavicized family name affixes ("-ov" "-yev") could be replaced by affixes like "-lı" (depending on the root of the word "-li", "-lu", "-lü"), "-zadə", "-oğlu" (which means "son of"), "-qızı" (which means "daughter of"), or could simply be dropped. Besides name and surname, patronymics are also in use, however mostly in legal documents, not in daily use. For example, while Ilham Aliyev is known by his name and surname, his full name is "Ilham Heydar oghlu Aliyev" (İlham Heydər oğlu Əliyev).

A special commission set up under the Azerbaijan National Academy of Sciences has prepared a special concept on surnames and submitted it to the Presidential Administration. The commission of the Azerbaijan National Academy of Sciences has considered four options. They suggested the forms "-lı", "-li", "-lu", "-lü", "-oğlu" or both "-soy" (which means "family line") and "-gil" (which means "from").

According to the chairman of the Culture Committee of the Milli Majlis, Nizami Jafarov, in 2010, 80% of the family name affixes in Azerbaijan was "-ov", "-yev", while 10% of population use "-li", "-lu", "-lu" and another 10% use "-zade". The Civil Registry Offices consider only "-ov", "-yev" acceptable based on the previous law. Sometimes, citizens are allowed to choose the affixes like "-lı", "-li", "-lu", "-lü" even if it happens with difficulties.

Georgian Azerbaijani activists started similar campaigning to get rid of Russian surnames.

== See also ==
- Derussification
