= Bernhard Ekström =

Swedish politician (1890–1956)

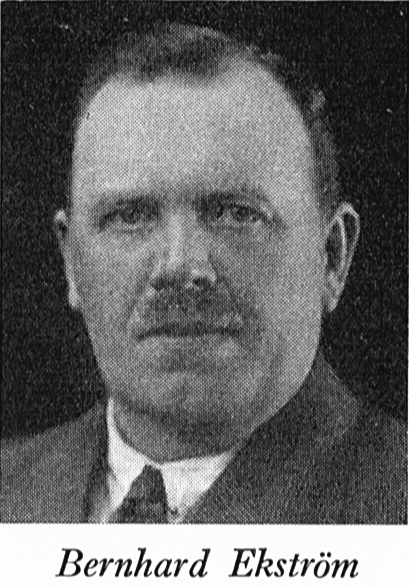
Image of Bernhard Ekström

Bernhard Ekström (30 March 1890 – 20 June 1956) was a Swedish politician. He was a member of the Centre Party. He was a member of the Parliament of Sweden (upper chamber) from 1948.
