= Vivian Garrison =

American applied medical anthropologist (1933–2013)

- Born: August 28, 1933; Butte
- Died: April 2, 2013 (aged 79)
- Occupation: Anthropologist
- Spouse(s): Conrad M. Arensberg

Vivian E. Garrison (August 28, 1933 – April 2, 2013) was an applied medical anthropologist who researched mental health care among low-income, minority, and migrant communities in the New York metropolitan area.

== Early life ==
Garrison, known as "Kelly" to friends and family, was born on August 28, 1933, in Butte, Montana. She earned a B.A. in Spanish and psychology from New York University in 1961 and a Ph.D. in anthropology from Columbia University in 1972. She completed her dissertation, Social Networks, Social Change and Mental Health among Migrants in a New York City Slum, in 1971. Garrison married anthropologist Conrad M. Arensberg in 1973.

== Career ==
Garrison was an applied medical anthropologist who researched the cultural understandings of, and community treatment structures surrounding, mental illness and health care among low-income, minority, and migrant communities in the New York metropolitan area. She worked predominantly with African American, Hispanic, and Caribbean migrant populations in the South Bronx and in Newark, New Jersey. The majority of Garrison's research was completed at Lincoln Hospital in the Bronx, at the College/University of Medicine and Dentistry of New Jersey, and at Columbia University. A number of her projects were supported by the National Institute of Mental Health (NIMH).

Throughout her career, Garrison acted as a consultant for projects on folk healing and community health care. Garrison published frequently on folk healing, espiritismo, psychiatry, and psychiatric methodology. She taught intermittently, including teaching a semester of Margaret Mead's Problems and Methods in Anthropology course at Columbia University (1979). She also contributed to the President's Commission on Mental Health in 1977–1978.

== Death and legacy ==
Garrison died in April 2013 at age 79. Her papers were donated to the Smithsonian's National Anthropological Archives with support from the Wenner-Gren Foundation for Anthropological Research in 2017.
