= Geraldine McGowan =

Irish singer

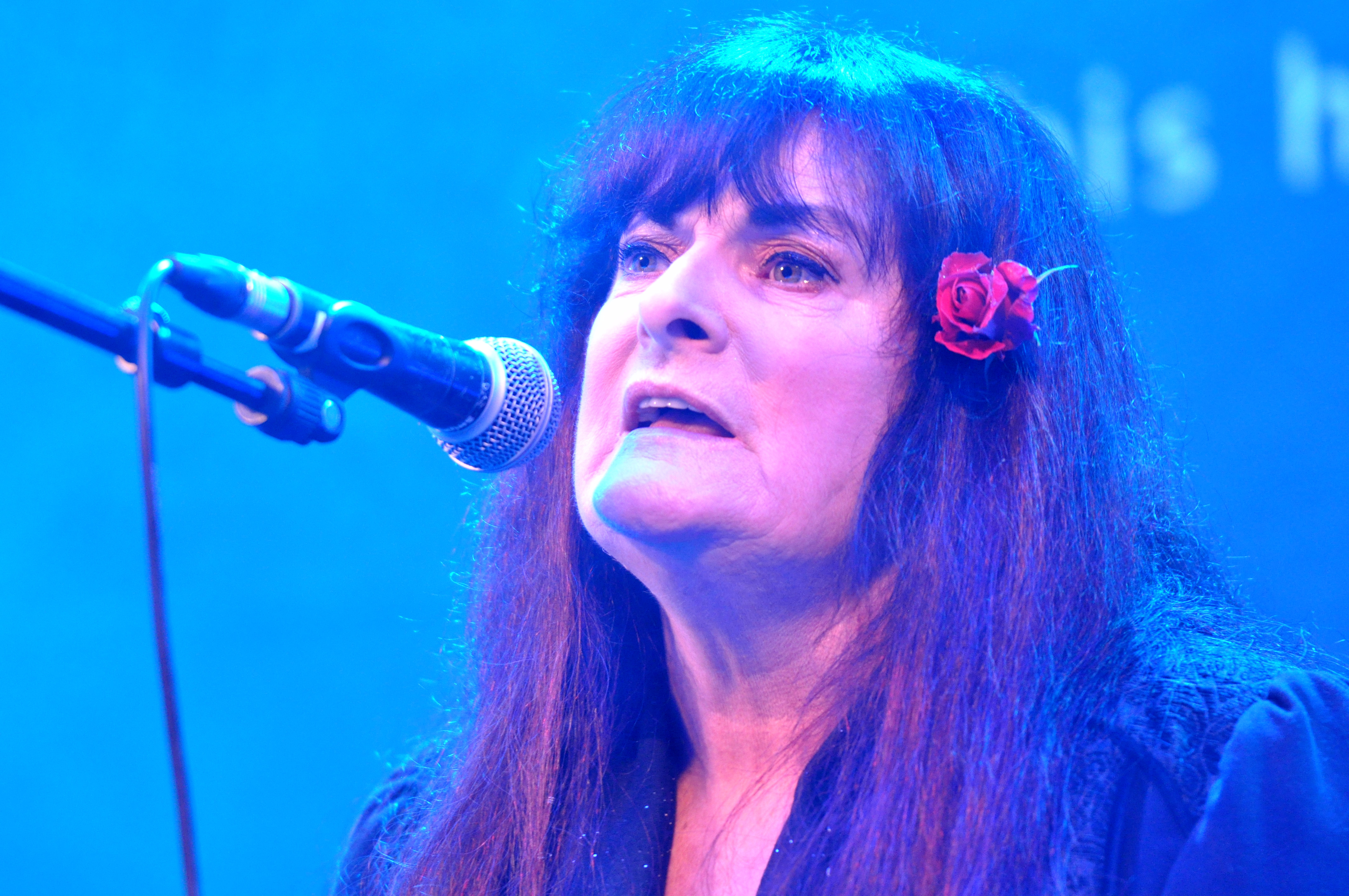
Geraldine MacGowan at the 2016 blacksheep festival in Germany

Geraldine McGowan is a singer from Dublin, Ireland.

== Works (selection) ==
- Somewhere Along The Road
- MMR CD 1003 "Reconciliation" on Magnetic Music
- MMR CD 1007 "´til the morning comes" on Magnetic Music
- MMR CD 1029 "Timeless" on Magnetic Music
- GER015 "Through the Years" (2007)

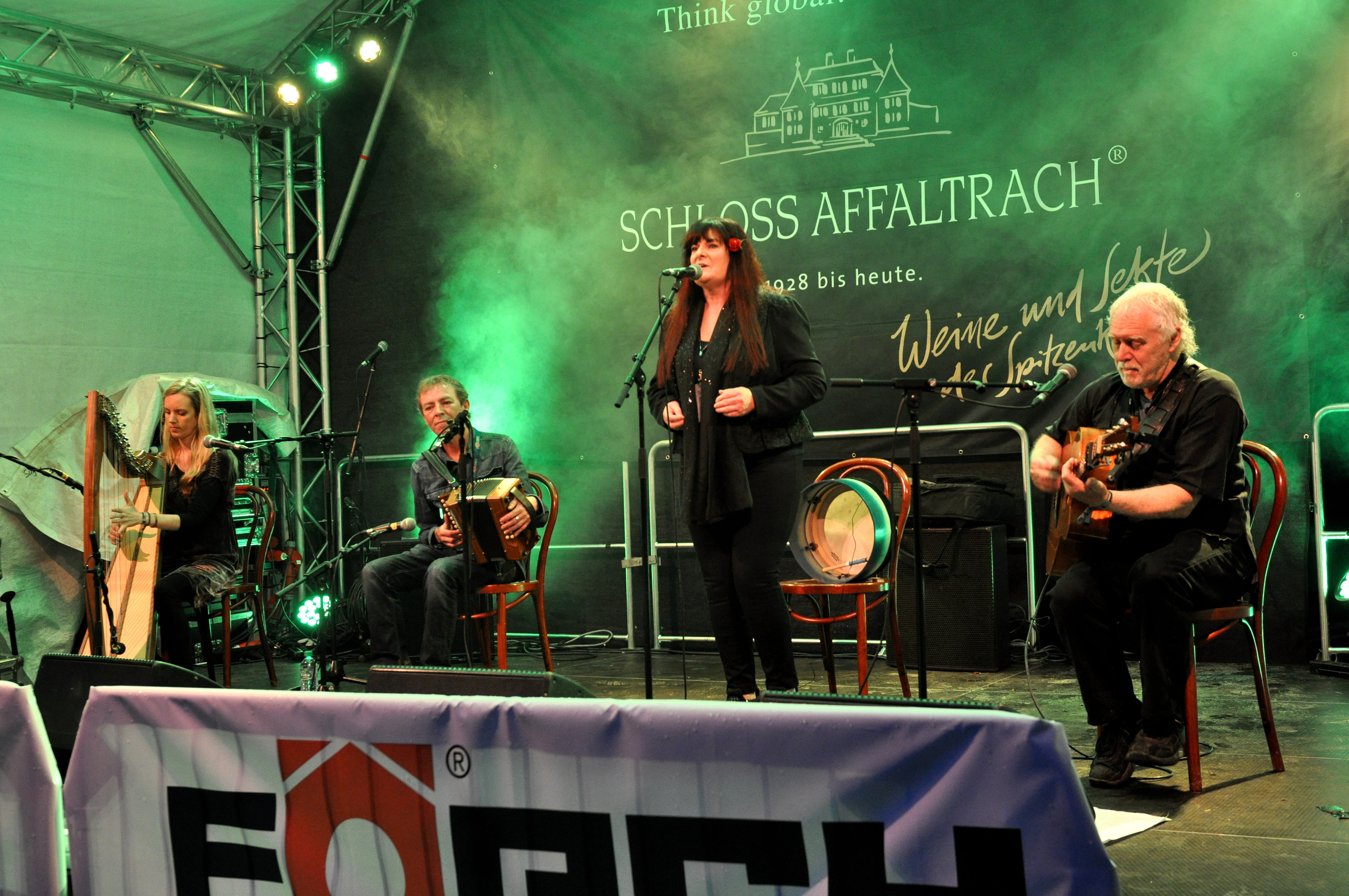
Geraldine MacGowan with her band at the 2016 blacksheep festival
