= Kristin Eklund =

Swedish artist and musician

- Also known as: Nami
- Born: 14 August 1979 (age 46); Kroksjö, Nybro, Sweden
- Genres: lo-fi music; electronic music; instrumental Music; video game music
- Occupations: Musician, Arts
- Instrument: Guitar, Piano, Organ, Keyboard
- Years active: 1998–present
- Labels: Bitterljuv

Kristin Eklund (born 1979) is a Swedish artist who uses the stage name Naimi. She grew up in the small village of Kroksjö, situated in Nybro Municipality, Småland, in the south of Sweden. Eklund has been playing various instrument since she was 7 years old, it started as for so many other Swedish artists in The Municipal music school. Music has been an important part of Eklund's family; her sister Anna Eklund is the lead singer in the Swedish band Sad Day for Puppets.

Kristin Eklund's professional music career came to a start when she bought a pump organ in 1998, it was also then she took the stage name Naimi, after her grandmother. Her music can be described as diverse and obstinate, she plays guitar, piano, organ, keyboard, and also makes electronic music with winks to the 1980s computer and video game music. The lyrics are in both Swedish and English.

Today she is active in Stockholm. Eklund is also an artist and work with a variety of techniques, including painting, drawing, photography, video and animation. She is behind the comic "Ensam är ledsen" which have a direct translated English spin-off, called "Sad and Lonely". In January 2010, Eklund started her own record label. Bitterljuv, which means bittersweet, a reference to her music.

== Discography ==
- 2001 – Benno presents Vol.5. 7" Vinyl-EP. (Benno).
- 2005 – Lagom är sämst. EP. (Music Is My Girlfriend).
- 2006 – Det är jag som bestämmer inte du. CD. (To Whom It May Concern)
- 2010 – Försöker lämna det gamla bakom mig CDS (Free to Download) (Bitterljuv).
- 2010 – Demonen, kärleken och jag. CD. (Bitterljuv).
- 2014 – A New Beginning. (with Ars Sonor) CD. (Art1ficial Records).

=== Album released on Spotify ===
- Low-fi-skivan. Album 2011
- Upp och ner och hit och dit (2024 Remaster). Album 2012
- Padddmusic (2024 Remaster). Album 2013
- The Black Hole. Album 2017
- Far From Happy. Album 2020

== Printed references ==
- Interview with Kristin Eklund (Naimi). Det grymma svärdet, NR2 2008 (P.57-61). Lystring 2008 ISBN 978-91-633-1574-9
