= Eve Garrison =

American artist

- Born: Eve Josephson; April 22, 1903; Boston, Massachusetts, United States
- Died: April 17, 2003 (aged 99); Chicago, Illinois, United States
- Education: Art Institute of Chicago (1930)
- Known for: Painting
- Style: Landscape art Portraiture; Abstract art
- Movement: Modernism; Realism
- Spouse: Joseph D. Garrison

Eve Josephson Garrison (1903–2003) was a modernist painter. Her early works were in a realist style and included landscapes and cityscapes, specifically depicting Chicago, Colorado, and Mexico. She also painted nudes and portraits and increasingly abstract and textured art in later life. She suggested that creating work for juried shows and annuals was not the way "to be a great artists!" Instead, she began making work that she felt was more expressive of her ideas. In the sixties she began making work that she termed "sculptural relief oil paintings". This involved a process of embedding objects such as seeds, branches, glass, and string into the paint. During the period she was producing more abstract work she had solo exhibitions in New York, Detroit, Milwaukee, Miami, Paris, and London.

In 1957, Garrison, along with twenty-three other artists, including Leo Segedin, co-founded Exhibit A, the first post-war, artist-run cooperative gallery in Chicago.

== Early life ==
Garrison graduated from School of the Art Institute of Chicago in 1930. She also exhibited at the Art Institute of Chicago's Annual Chicago and Vicinity Artists exhibition between 1934 and 1940.

== Exhibitions ==
- 1934–1940 Annual Exhibition of Works by Chicago and Vicinity Artists, AIC
- 1983 After the Great Crash: New Deal Art in Illinois, Illinois State Museum
- 2007 Eve Garrison: Life Study, 70 Years of figurative painting

== Awards ==
- 1933 Prize, Chicago Galleries Association
- 1933 Prize, Washington (DC) Society of Artists
