= Mike Terpstra (cyclist) =

Dutch cyclist

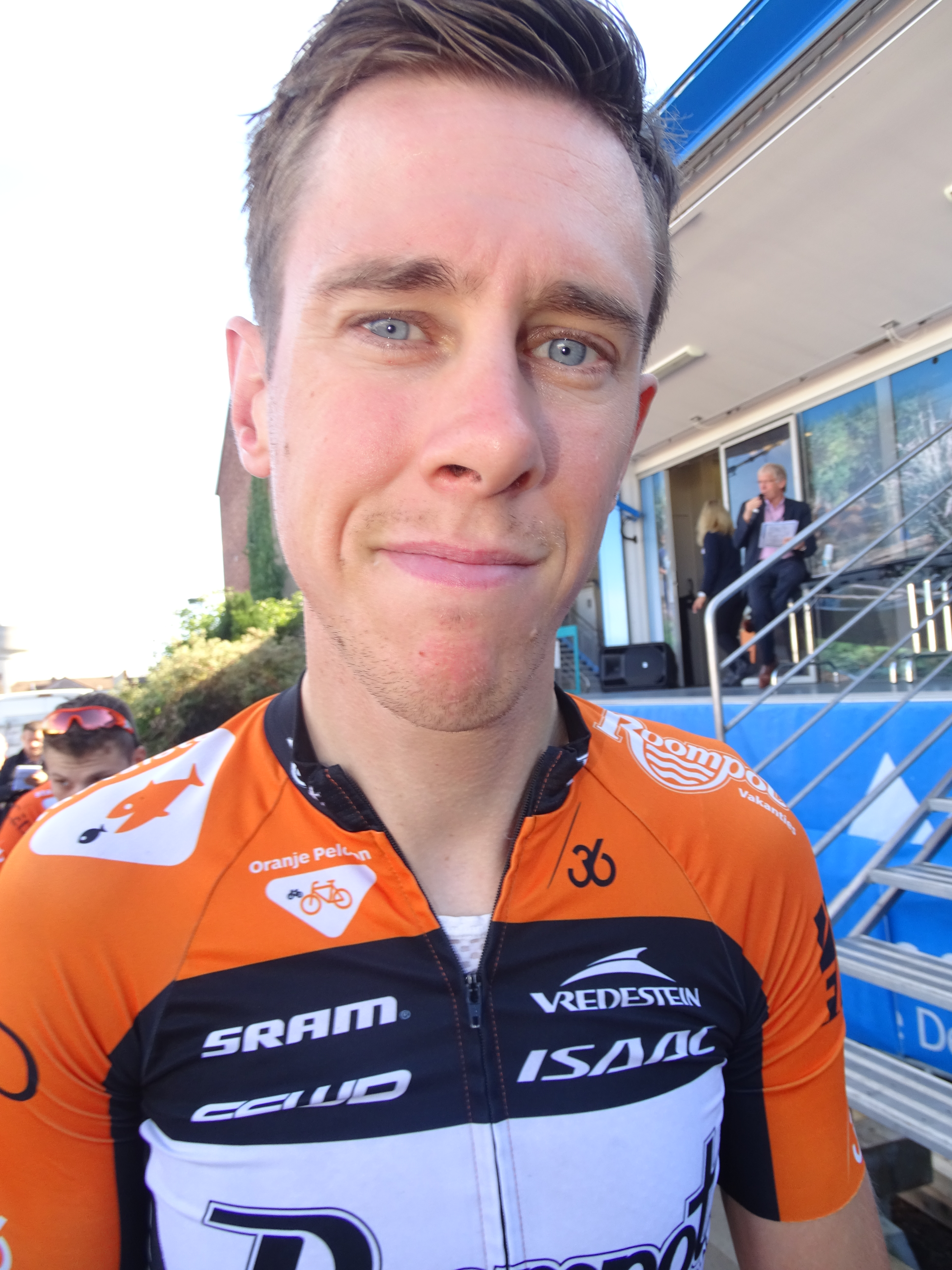

Personal information
- Born: 24 April 1987 (age 39) Beverwijk, Netherlands
- Height: 1.89 m (6 ft 2 in)
- Weight: 64 kg (141 lb)

Cycling career
- Sport: Cycling
- Discipline: Road
- Role: Rider

Amateur teams
- 2011: Diputación de León-Deyser
- 2012: Azysa-Telco'm-Conor
- 2014: Croford Cycling Team

Professional teams
- 2010: Koga–CreditForce–Ubbink Track
- 2013: Team3M
- 2015: Team Roompot

Mike Terpstra (born 24 April 1987) is a Dutch professional racing cyclist. He is the brother of fellow racing cyclist Niki Terpstra.

== Major results ==
2013
7th Volta Limburg Classic
9th Overall Kreiz Breizh Elites
