= Boiler room (business) =

Type of call center

In business, a boiler room is an outbound call center selling questionable investments by telephone. It usually refers to a room where salespeople work using unfair, dishonest sales tactics, sometimes selling penny stocks or private placements or committing outright stock fraud. A common boiler room tactic is the use of falsified and bolstered information in combination with verified company-released information. The term is pejorative: it is often used to imply high-pressure sales tactics and, sometimes, poor working conditions.

== Business structure ==
The classic image of a boiler room is that it has an undisclosed relationship with the companies it promotes, or an undisclosed profit motive for promoting those companies.

Once the insider investors are in place, a boiler room promotes (by telephone calls to brokerage clients or spam email) these thinly traded stocks (i.e. stocks that are not purchased or sold very often) where there is no actual market. The brokers of the boiler room actually "create" a market by attracting buyers, whose demand for the stock drives up the price; this gives the owners of the company enough volume to sell their shares at a profit, a form of pump and dump operation where the original investors profit at the expense of the investors taken in by the boiler room operation.

In the 20th century, the U.S. Securities and Exchange Commission described boiler rooms as follows:

The brokers sat "cheek by jowl" in a room the size of a basketball court. All of their desks were lined up side by side in rows. The firm held mandatory sales meetings every morning at 8:30 a.m. at which time sales techniques were demonstrated and scripts for the firm's "house stock" … were distributed. Brokers were expected to follow the scripts and only give customers the information they contained.

Some traits of a boiler room include presenting only good news about the stock to be sold, and discouraging outside research by customers or brokers working there. The International Journal of Law, Crime and Justice states that:

There is a fairly strict division of labour within the boiler room. At the bottom of the hierarchy are the ‘qualifiers’ who try to interest customers into making an investment. They may make unsolicited telephone calls and send out newsletters. Next are the ‘verifiers’ or ‘openers’ who call customers to make them more interested in the investment and their firm, win the confidence of the victim and sell them, perhaps initially, a small amount of shares.

=== House stock ===
A house stock is a stock that the management of a brokerage firm or boiler room has instructed all its brokers to promote. The brokerage firm or its owners might be receiving an undisclosed profit from the sale of the house stock.

== Etymology ==
The term might have originated from the cheap, hastily arranged office space used by such firms, often just a few desks in the basement or utility room of an existing office building, with the "heat" and "pressure" of close quarters, and fast-paced sales tactics analogous to the conditions in a boiler and, in the former case, its surrounding room.

In the early 1970s (and possibly earlier), boiler room was a term used by political parties for a room with many telephones used to call prospective voters.

In 1968, Senator Robert F. Kennedy had six women working for him as the "Boiler Room Girls", as they were known, and whose fame grew as a result of the death of Mary Jo Kopechne in 1969.

== Modern boiler rooms ==
In the late 1960s to the 1980s, boiler rooms sold municipal bonds to unsophisticated investors. These boiler rooms were located primarily in the southeastern United States, most notably Memphis, Tennessee and later Little Rock, Arkansas. The operators got the nickname "Bond Daddies." The operators would sell the bonds at inflated prices, substitute different bonds, mislead investors about the risks, or fail to deliver the bonds to the investor.

In the 1990s, organized crime in New York City became involved in microcap stock fraud using boiler rooms.

Although many disappeared in the 1990s following the burst of the "dot-com bubble", many boiler rooms still operate across the world. Reductions in telecommunication costs mean that a company can viably operate in one country while calling prospective investors in another. The advantage of such an operation is that a company can operate without fear of prosecution from the investor's native legal system. For example, many boiler rooms contacting prospective investors in the United Kingdom operate from Spanish cities such as Barcelona and Valencia.

A boiler room operation is well exemplified by the case of Fort Lauderdale-based company First Resource Group LLC, charged by the U.S. Securities and Exchange Commission with conducting a fraudulent boiler room scheme in 2012. According to the SEC, First Resource (and the company's founder, David H. Stern) used a telephone sales boiler room to make inflated claims and defraud investors while simultaneously manipulating the price of the stocks and making profits for themselves.

With the advent of the internet and the ability to create web sites easily without any regulatory involvement, as well as the ability to operate from other jurisdictions, boiler rooms have continued to operate into the 21st century. It is easy for scammers to set up a web site in one country, operate from another country and target victims in a third country, hiding their identity and making it difficult to trace them. Financial regulation varies significantly from country to country, and some countries deliberately promote low regulatory environments in order to attract financial business. This makes it easy for boiler rooms to use this to their advantage. Financial supervisory authorities in each country have significant difficulty enforcing rules on scammers in other countries. With low financial literacy by investors or victims (particularly in the increasingly complex ways that global financial markets operate), and without better coordination between financial regulators in different countries, boiler rooms continue to operate.

=== Gold Coast boiler room scams ===
The Gold Coast has been described by investigators as the capital of investment fraud in Australia, with numerous boiler room operators selling bogus investment and sports betting schemes to Australian and overseas customers. The Australian Crime Commission estimates Australians had lost at least AU$113 million up to 2012. In 2025, Australians reported losses of 837.7 million Australian dollars to investment scams of all types nationwide, not only boiler room schemes, according to the Australian Competition and Consumer Commission citing the National Anti-Scam Centre's Targeting Scams report.

Operators of the scams buy old shelf companies with no complaint history to give the appearance they've been trading legitimately for long periods. When complaints cause reputation problems they close the company and start anew. Virtual offices, fake receptionists and fake testimonials are used, and telemarketers cold call victims with misleading claims of high returns. Victims say the betting and investment software does not work and they lost their money when the companies suddenly closed. In 2011, private investigator, Ken Gamble, acting on behalf of groups of victims, provided evidence of millions of dollars' worth of fraud to the Queensland Police Service, but says the fraud squad failed to investigate. In late 2014, it was announced Queensland's Crime and Corruption Commission had taken over investigation of several Gold Coast boiler room scams due to allegations fraudsters were receiving police protection.

== In popular culture ==
A fictional "boiler room" brokerage firm was dramatized in the 2000 film Boiler Room, starring Giovanni Ribisi and the play and 1992 film Glengarry Glen Ross show a similar boiler room operation selling real estate.

Season two of the HBO show The Sopranos depicts a pump and dump scheme being operated out of a boiler room by associates of the fictional DiMeo crime family.

The 2013 film The Wolf of Wall Street, starring Leonardo DiCaprio, also involves a boiler-room investment business and is based on the memoir of convicted penny stock fraudster Jordan Belfort, whose Stratton Oakmont brokerage house operated as a boiler room. A 2010 episode of the television series White Collar depicted fictional conman Neal Caffrey infiltrating a group of corrupt brokers also peddling inflated penny stocks.

== Victims ==
Individuals will be targeted through the use of mediums such as the sucker list which discloses information about those who have fallen victim to scams in the past. Another avenue, and one that is not as accessible due to its shielded nature, is the utilization of shareholder lists. These lists provide information that links the employees of the boiler room businesses to the people most susceptible to fraud.

=== Victim support ===
The Office for Victims of Crime offers monetary aid to victims of crimes throughout the United States. These funds come directly from the "federal offenders" as well as from private donations and gifts. In addition to this, it "raises awareness about victims' issues, promotes compliance with victims' rights laws, and provides training and technical assistance and publications and products to victim assistance professionals." It also links victims to The United States Department of Justice Victim Notification System, which was developed to maintain victims informed of case activity. Victims may register online to receive notifications regarding their relevant case.

=== Emotional impact ===
Impacts of fraudulent boiler room business range from financial loss to decline in mental health and stability. Victims often suffer from stress, anxiety, loss of self-esteem, and depression. This decline in health and financial wealth has reportedly been linked to marriage dissolution as well as thoughts of suicide, and attempts of suicide. Victims also exhibited changes in behavior that included wariness of others and of financial transactions. On the other hand, many victims became more aware of the importance of security and as such took preventative action for the future.

== See also ==
- Bucket shop
- Foreign exchange fraud
- Microcap stock fraud
- Pump and dump
- Stock dilution
