= Danny Porush =

American businessman (born 1957)

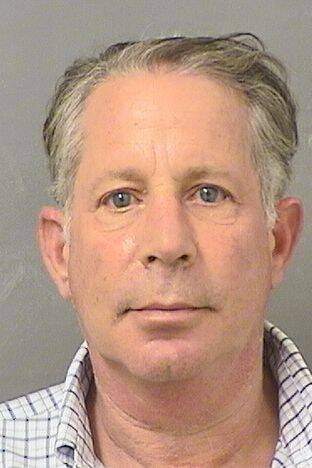
- Porush in 2021
- Born: February 1957 (age 69); Lawrence, New York, U.S.
- Occupations: Businessman; stockbroker
- Spouse(s): Nancy Porush (m. 1986; div. 2000) Lisa Krause (m. 2000; div. 2020)
- Status: Released in 2004 after 39 months
- Convictions: Securities fraud; money laundering
- Penalty: 39 months in federal prison, $200 million in restitution

Daniel Mark Porush (born February 1957) is an American businessman, criminal and former stock broker. In the 1990s, he was found guilty of running a pump and dump stock fraud scheme at the Stratton Oakmont brokerage in collaboration with Jordan Belfort. In 1999, he was convicted of securities fraud and money laundering, for which he served 39 months in prison. After prison, Porush became involved with a Florida-based medical supply company, Med-Care, which was the subject of federal investigations. In the biographical 2013 film The Wolf of Wall Street, which focuses on the story of Belfort and Stratton Oakmont, Jonah Hill portrays Donnie Azoff, a character loosely based on Porush. Porush called the portrayal inaccurate and threatened to sue the filmmakers.

== Early life and education ==
Danny Porush, the son of a doctor, was raised in a Jewish family in Lawrence, Nassau County, New York. He graduated from Lawrence Woodmere Academy. He attended Dickinson College and Boston University but did not graduate. According to New York magazine, Porush then "bounced from job to job, working for, and starting up, a variety of small businesses."

== Career ==
=== Stratton Oakmont ===
In the late 1980s, Porush helped Jordan Belfort found Stratton Oakmont, a Long Island, New York "over-the-counter" (OTC) brokerage house of which Belfort was chairman and Porush was president. Stratton Oakmont specialized in selling "penny stocks" and underwriting initial public offerings for small companies, including for Steve Madden (a childhood friend of Porush), Master Glazier's Karate International Inc., Dualstar Technologies, Select Media Communications, United Leisure Corporation and Questron Technology. In 1994, Porush took over as chairman and CEO of Stratton after Belfort was barred from the industry.

Beginning in 1989, Stratton Oakmont became the subject of numerous disciplinary actions by the National Association of Securities Dealers (NASD) and Securities and Exchange Commission (SEC). It was determined that Stratton Oakmont was involved in pump and dump stock fraud that involved artificially inflating the price of stocks through false and misleading positive statements in order to sell cheaply purchased stock at a higher price. Once the operators of the scheme "dumped" their overvalued shares, the price fell and investors lost their money. In December 1996, the NASD permanently expelled Stratton Oakmont and barred Porush as well, fining him $250,000. The NASD rejected Porush's claim that he was only "a figurehead", citing him as the salesperson with the largest individual allocation. In its decision to bar Porush and his head trader, Steven P. Sanders, the NASD wrote that "[they] continue to deny responsibility and exhibit no remorse for [their] misconduct, and, but for the bar, would continue to pose an ongoing risk to the investing public."

Following a federal indictment, Porush and Belfort pleaded guilty to 10 counts of securities fraud and money laundering in 1999. In an exchange for reduced sentences, they cooperated with federal investigations of their colleagues. Porush was "convicted of insider trading, perjury, conspiracy and money laundering and ordered to pay $200 million in restitution." He was sentenced to four years in prison and Belfort to two years. Porush was released on probation in 2004 after serving 39 months.

In 2013, the story of Stratton Oakmont as told by Belfort in his 2007 memoir was made into Martin Scorsese's The Wolf of Wall Street. In the film, Jonah Hill portrays the character Donnie Azoff, loosely based on Porush. Porush has said that many of the movie's scenes are fictional. The character's name was changed during movie development after Porush threatened to sue Paramount Pictures if he was depicted.

=== Medical supplies ===
After his release from prison in 2004, Porush became involved with a Boca Raton, Florida-based medical supply and medical equipment company that, according to Forbes magazine, has operated under the names Med-Care Diabetic & Medical Supplies, Christian Diabetics and the Christian Healthcare Network. Med-Care was the subject of a congressional hearing on Medicare fraud in April 2013. In May 2014, Porush's involvement with Med-Care was cited as reason for a portion of the federal Stop Scams Act of 2014, which would require Medicare providers to disclose their ownership interests. According to Med-Care's attorney, the Centers for Medicare & Medicaid Services had been informed and had previously reviewed, and approved, Porush's role with the company.

In 2014, Porush and five other Med-Care company personnel were named in a whistleblower lawsuit alleging fraudulent Medicare claims. The case was initially dismissed in federal court for lack of specific proof. But the lawsuit was refiled and accepted in federal court when the initial whistleblower was joined by two more former Med-Care employees alleging the company of defrauding the federal government. The lawsuit alleged that telemarketers, under Porush's guidance, made unsolicited calls to citizens and used high-pressure sales tactics to push them to accept medical supplies they might not have wanted. On January 14, 2015, Federal Bureau of Investigation (FBI) agents, Florida fraud department, and local police raided Med-Care Diabetic & Medical Supplies' Boca Raton offices and removed files. On January 16, 2015, Med-Care's attorneys filed a motion in court to disqualify the whistleblowers' attorneys for professional conflict of interest.

== Personal life ==
In 1986, Porush married his first cousin Nancy. They had three children, and divorced in 2000. Porush then married Lisa Michelle Krause. They divorced in 2020.

In 2006, Porush's first wife sued him for failure to pay child support. He said he owned no assets and that everything belonged to his second wife.

== See also ==
- Stratton Oakmont, Inc. v. Prodigy Services Co.
