= Gregory Coleman =

Gregory Coleman may refer to:

- Gregory Coleman (guitarist) (1949–2005), American guitarist and educator
- Gregory C. Coleman (1944–2006), American drummer of the Winstons and performer of the Amen break
- Greg Coleman (American football) (born 1954), American football player
- Greg Coleman (jurist), American lawyer
- Gregory Coleman (FBI special agent), FBI special agent
- Gregory Coleman (sprinter), winner of the 2015 4 × 400 meter relay at the NCAA Division I Indoor Track and Field Championships
