= Steve Madden =

American fashion designer and businessman (born 1958)

- Born: March 23, 1958 (age 68); Queens, New York, U.S.
- Occupations: Fashion designer, and businessman
- Employer: Steve Madden (company)
- Known for: Founder of shoe company and conviction of financial crime
- Spouse: Wendy Ballew (m. 2005; div. 2015)
- Children: 3

Steven Madden (born March 23, 1958) is an American fashion designer and businessman. He is the founder and former chief executive officer of Steve Madden, Ltd., a publicly traded company. He was forced to resign as an executive following his conviction for financial crimes.

== Life and career ==
Madden was born in Far Rockaway, Queens, the son of a Jewish mother and an Irish Catholic father. He grew up in adjoining Lawrence and graduated from Lawrence High School in Nassau County, New York. After high school, Madden studied at the University of Miami for two years before returning to Long Island. The youngest of three brothers, he started Steve Madden, Ltd. with $1,100 in 1990 by selling shoes out of the trunk of his car.

== Criminal conviction ==
Madden's financial affairs were closely entangled with Long Island "pump and dump" brokerage house Stratton Oakmont, cofounded by Madden's childhood friend Danny Porush, who first lent him money to expand his fledgling company, and then underwrote its initial public offering.

In June 2000, a class action lawsuit was filed against Madden for issuing materially false and misleading statements during the Class Period. A settlement of $9 million was reached in 2004. In 2001, the SEC filed charges against Madden in Federal Court in New York state, alleging Securities Exchange Commission (SEC) violations. Because the violations were not criminal in nature, the SEC was seeking to recover $1,637,000 in a combination of illegally avoided losses, interest, and a civil penalty.

In 2002, Madden was convicted of stock manipulation, money laundering, and securities fraud. He was sentenced to 41 months in prison, and was made to resign as CEO from Steven Madden, Ltd. and from the board of directors. Shortly after resigning as CEO, Madden set himself up as a creative consultant with Steven Madden, Ltd., a position for which he drew $700,000 annually even when he was in prison.

Madden served time in the Federal Prison Camp, Eglin, at Eglin Air Force Base, and later the Coleman Federal Correctional Complex, near Ocala, Florida. Madden was released from prison in April 2005. He then attended a New York City halfway house. Madden's attorney, Joel Winograd, said that Madden would stay at the house for 60 days. After his release from a halfway house, he was restricted to home confinement for a period.

== Post-release ==
After Madden was released from prison in 2005, the company quickly rebounded, increasing revenue by nearly $100 million in 2006 to $475.1 million. That same year, Steven Madden, Ltd. was named 'Company of the Year' for the second time at the Footwear News Achievement Awards.

With Madden currently serving as the founder and design chief, the company continues to show growth year-over-year reporting $1.9 billion in revenue for FY2021.

Madden contributed to The Doe Fund, a charity devoted to working on the causes of homelessness, addiction, and criminal recidivism.

== In popular culture ==
Steve Madden (played by Jake Hoffman) is featured in Martin Scorsese's film The Wolf of Wall Street, which is based on Jordan Belfort's memoir of the same name. In the film, Madden is seen visiting Stratton Oakmont, where Belfort gives the brokers a rousing pep talk about pushing Madden's stock.

== Personal life ==
Madden admits to having abused alcohol and various drugs, and later attended court-ordered rehabilitation.

Madden married Wendy Ballew, his former director of operations, in 2005 after he was released from prison. The couple have three children, twins Jack and Stevie Madden, and Goldie Ryan Madden. The couple divorced in 2015.

== Awards and honors ==
- Footwear News Achievement Award Hall of Fame (December 2019)
- Footwear News Reader's Choice: Person of the Year Award (December 2011)
- NASDAQ Honors Steve Madden & 20 Year Anniversary (June 2010)
- Two Ten Foundation Honors Steve Madden (June 2010)
