= The Wolf of Wall Street (2013 film) =

2013 American film by Martin Scorsese

- Theatrical release poster
- Directed by: Martin Scorsese
- Screenplay by: Terence Winter
- Based on: The Wolf of Wall Street by Jordan Belfort
- Produced by: Martin Scorsese; Leonardo DiCaprio; Riza Aziz; Joey McFarland; Emma Tillinger Koskoff
- Starring: Leonardo DiCaprio; Jonah Hill; Margot Robbie; Matthew McConaughey; Kyle Chandler; Rob Reiner; Jon Favreau; Jean Dujardin
- Cinematography: Rodrigo Prieto
- Edited by: Thelma Schoonmaker
- Production companies: Red Granite Pictures; Sikelia Productions; Appian Way Productions; EMJAG Productions
- Distributed by: Paramount Pictures
- Release dates: December 17, 2013 (Ziegfeld Theatre); December 25, 2013 (United States)
- Running time: 179 minutes
- Country: United States
- Language: English
- Budget: $100 million
- Box office: $407 million

The Wolf of Wall Street is a 2013 American biographical film co-produced and directed by Martin Scorsese, written by Terence Winter, and based on Jordan Belfort's 2007 memoir. It loosely recounts Belfort's career as a stockbroker in New York City and how his firm, Stratton Oakmont, engaged in rampant corruption and fraud on Wall Street, leading to his downfall. The film stars Leonardo DiCaprio as Belfort; Jonah Hill as his business partner and friend Donnie Azoff; Margot Robbie as his second wife, Naomi Lapaglia; Matthew McConaughey as his mentor and former boss Mark Hanna; and Kyle Chandler as FBI special agent Patrick Denham portraying Gregory Coleman. It is DiCaprio's fifth collaboration with Scorsese.

DiCaprio and Warner Bros. acquired the rights to Belfort's memoir in 2007, but production was halted due to content restrictions. It was later produced by the independent Red Granite Pictures. The film was shot in New York in late 2012, using mostly 35mm film stock.

The film premiered in New York City on December 17, 2013, and was released in the United States on December 25, by Paramount Pictures, with Universal Pictures releasing in Europe and the United Kingdom. It was the first major American film to be released exclusively through digital distribution. It was a major commercial success, grossing $407 million worldwide during its theatrical run, becoming Scorsese's highest-grossing film. However, the film initially sparked controversy for its moral ambiguity and lack of sympathy for victims, as well as graphic sexual content, extreme profanity (with at least 500 uses of the expletive "fuck"), depiction of hard drug use, and use of animals during production. The film was initially rated NC-17 by the Motion Picture Association of America, but it was shortly appealed for an R rating after Scorsese made slight changes to the film. It set a Guinness World Record for the most instances of profanity in a film. The film's financing became implicated in the 1Malaysia Development Berhad corruption scandal; the U.S. Department of Justice and the Malaysian Anti-Corruption Commission investigated Red Granite Pictures, and producer Riza Aziz was arrested in 2019. He was discharged in May 2020 on a 1,000,000 Malaysian ringgit (US$240,000) bail.

The film received positive reviews from critics and appeared on several "best of the year" lists. It was nominated for several awards, including five at the 86th Academy Awards ceremony: Best Picture, Best Director, Best Adapted Screenplay, Best Actor (for DiCaprio) and Best Supporting Actor (for Hill). DiCaprio won Best Actor – Musical or Comedy at the 71st Golden Globe Awards, where the film was also nominated for Best Picture – Musical or Comedy.

== Plot ==
In 1987, twenty-two-year-old Jordan Belfort becomes a Wall Street stockbroker for L.F. Rothschild, employed under Mark Hanna. Quickly enticed by the drug-fueled stockbroker culture, he learns that their only goal is to make themselves rich, no matter the cost. Jordan loses his job following Black Monday, the largest one-day stock market drop since the crash of 1929, and joins Investor's Center, a boiler room brokerage on Long Island, specializing in pink sheet penny stocks. He makes a small fortune thanks to his aggressive pitching style and high commissions.

Befriending neighbor Donnie Azoff, Jordan and he start their own boiler room brokerage. Jordan's childhood friends Robbie Feinberg, Alden Kupferburg, Nicky Koskoff, Chester Ming, and Toby Welch are recruited as well as drug pusher Brad Bodnick. Jordan trains them on the "hard sell." Jordan's tactics and salesmanship make his pump and dump scheme successful. To cloak this, Jordan gives the firm the respectable-sounding name of Stratton Oakmont in 1989.

Soon after, the company becomes immensely successful, moving out of the auto repair shop into a bigger office. An exposé in Forbes which dubs Jordan "The Wolf of Wall Street" – "a sort of twisted Robin Hood who takes from the rich and gives to himself and his merry band of brokers"— initially enrages Belfort until it causes hundreds of ambitious young financiers to flock to the company, thus causing them to move into even bigger offices.

Jordan becomes immensely wealthy, and slides into a decadent lifestyle of prostitutes and drugs. He has an affair with lingerie designer Naomi Lapaglia; when his wife Teresa finds out, Jordan divorces her and marries Naomi in 1991. Meanwhile, the SEC and the FBI begin investigating Stratton Oakmont.

In 1993, Jordan illegally makes $22 million in three hours after securing the IPO of Steve Madden, Ltd., founded by Donnie's childhood friend and women's shoes designer Steve Madden, bringing him and his firm further FBI attention. Jordan tries to bribe agent Denham but fails, prompting him to seek a safe place for the money. He opens a Swiss bank account with corrupt banker Jean-Jacques Saurel, in the name of Naomi's aunt Emma, a British citizen who is outside the immediate reach of American authorities. He uses Brad's Swiss-Slovenian wife Chantalle and her family, who have Swiss passports, to smuggle the cash into Switzerland.

Donnie and Brad get into a heated argument in public during a money exchange, resulting in Brad's arrest as Donnie escapes. Donnie informs Jordan that he has come upon some "Lemmon 714" quaaludes, which the latter refers to as "the holy grail" of drugs. The two take the pills at Belfort's home, but they have no effect. They assume that they have expired, and wind up taking the rest of their supply.

Jordan's private investigator Bo Dietl calls him and tells him he needs to talk to him on a payphone. Jordan drives to a local country club and calls Bo, who informs him that the FBI is wiretapping his phones. While talking with Bo, the quaaludes kick in, and Jordan becomes extremely inebriated, struggling to get home in his Lamborghini Countach. When he gets home, he finds Donnie talking on the phone, and nearly strangles him with the phone cord. Donnie chokes on some meat; Jordan ingests cocaine to counteract the quaaludes and gives him the Heimlich maneuver. The next day, the police arrive and inform Jordan that his car has been trashed.

Jordan's father Max advises him to leave Stratton Oakmont and lie low while Jordan's lawyer negotiates a deal to keep him out of prison. In the midst of his farewell speech, Jordan cannot bear to quit and talks himself into staying, to the relief of his friends and employees, and the dismay of his father.

In 1996, Jordan, Donnie, and their wives are on a yacht trip to Italy, when they learn that Emma has died. Fearing for the money he left under her name in a Swiss account, Jordan announces that they will chart a course to Switzerland to forge her name on a document and save the account before going to London for the funeral. To bypass the border patrols, he orders his yacht captain Ted to sail to Monaco, but their ship capsizes in a storm. After their rescue, the plane sent to take them to Geneva is destroyed when a seagull flies into the engine; Jordan takes this as a sign from God to address his worsening drug addiction and attempts to sober up.

In 1998, Saurel and Koskoff are arrested for an unrelated crime, the former informing the FBI about Jordan as part of a plea bargain. Since the evidence against him is overwhelming, Jordan agrees to gather evidence from the rest of his colleagues in exchange for leniency. Now fully disgusted with Jordan's lifestyle, Naomi tells him that she is divorcing him, and is taking full custody of their children, causing Jordan to angrily punch her, relapse on cocaine, and tries to drive away with their daughter, but crashes his car in the driveway.

Later, Jordan wears a wire to work but slips a note to Donnie, warning him. The note is found by the FBI, who arrest Jordan, then raid and shut down Stratton Oakmont. Despite breaching his deal, Jordan receives a reduced sentence of 36 months in a minimum security prison for his testimony, and is released in 2000 after serving 22 months. After his release, Jordan makes a living hosting seminars on sales techniques, using the same test he used with his founding partners at his firm.

== Cast ==
- Leonardo DiCaprio as Jordan Belfort
- Jonah Hill as Donnie Azoff (Note: Fictionalized version of Danny Porush)
- Margot Robbie as Naomi Lapaglia (Note: Fictionalized version of Nadine Macaluso)
- Matthew McConaughey as Mark Hanna
- Kyle Chandler as FBI Agent Patrick Denham
- Rob Reiner as Max Belfort
- Jon Bernthal as Brad Bodnick
- Jon Favreau as Manny Riskin (Note: Fictionalized version of Ira Sorkin)
- Jean Dujardin as Jean-Jacques Saurel
- Joanna Lumley as Aunt Emma
- Cristin Milioti as Teresa Petrillo (Note: Fictionalized version of Denise Lombardo)
- Christine Ebersole as Leah Belfort
- Shea Whigham as Captain Ted Beecham
- Katarina Čas as Chantalle
- P. J. Byrne as Nicky Koskoff ("Rugrat")
- Kenneth Choi as Chester Ming ("Depraved Chinaman")
- Brian Sacca as Robbie Feinberg ("Pinhead")
- Henry Zebrowski as Alden Kupferberg ("Sea Otter")
- Ethan Suplee as Toby Welch
- Sandra Nelson as Aliyah Farran (Forbes Reporter)
- Aya Cash as Janet
- Madison McKinley Heidi (as Madison McKinley Garton)

In addition, cameos and smaller roles include Bo Dietl as himself, the real Jordan Belfort as the Auckland Straight Line host at the end of the film, Stephanie Kurtzuba as Kimmie Belzer, Thomas Middleditch as a Stratton broker whose goldfish is eaten by Donnie for slacking off, Jake Hoffman as Steve Madden, Fran Lebowitz as The Honorary [sic] Samantha Stogel, Edward Herrmann as the voiceover in the Stratton Oakmont commercial at the beginning of the film, Steve Buscemi appears through archive footage in an episode of The Equalizer, and an uncredited Spike Jonze as Dwayne, the head of the Long Island brokerage firm who introduces Belfort to the world of penny stocks.

== Production ==
=== Development ===
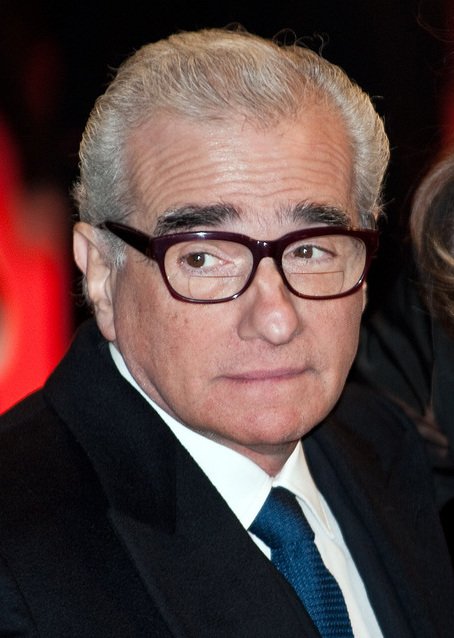
Martin Scorsese, the director of the film, in 2010

In 2007, DiCaprio and Warner Bros. won a bidding war for the rights to Belfort's memoir The Wolf of Wall Street, with Belfort making $1 million off the deal. Having worked on the film's script, Scorsese was considered to direct the film but abandoned the project to work on Shutter Island (2010). In 2010, Warner Bros. offered the directorial role to Ridley Scott, with Brad Pitt playing Belfort, but the studio eventually abandoned the project.

In 2012, the independent company Red Granite Pictures greenlit the project without content restrictions. Soon after, Scorsese came back on board. Red Granite Pictures also asked Paramount Pictures to distribute the film; Paramount agreed to do so in the United States, Canada and Japan, with Red Granite Pictures holding international rights through various independent distributors, Universal Pictures distributed the film in some countries in Europe and Roadshow Films distributed the film in Australia and New Zealand.

According to Belfort, Random House asked him to tone down or excise the depictions of debauchery in his memoir before publication, especially those relating to his bachelor party, which featured bestiality, and rampant use of drugs like nitrous oxide; neither the published memoir nor the film contains references to this.

In the film, most real-life characters' names have been changed from Belfort's original memoir. Donnie Azoff is based on Danny Porush. The name was changed after Porush threatened to sue the filmmakers and Paramount. Porush maintains that much of the film is fictional and that Azoff is not an accurate depiction of him. Former Donna Karan Jeanswear CEO Elliot Lavigne does not appear in the film, but an incident recounted in the book, in which Belfort gives Lavigne mouth-to-mouth resuscitation to save him from choking to death, is similar to a scene in the film involving Donnie. The FBI agent Patrick Denham is the stand-in for real-life Gregory Coleman, and lawyer Manny Riskin is based on Ira Sorkin. Belfort's first wife, Denise Lombardo, is renamed Teresa Petrillo, and his second wife, Nadine Caridi, is Naomi Lapaglia on-screen. In contrast, Mark Hanna's name remains the same as the LF Rothschild stockbroker who, like Belfort, was convicted of fraud and served time in prison. Belfort's parents Max and Leah Belfort's names remained the same for the film. The role of Aunt Emma was initially offered to Julie Andrews, who declined as she was recovering from an ankle injury, and was replaced by Joanna Lumley. Olivia Wilde auditioned for the role of Naomi, but she was rejected as she was deemed "too old" for the role despite DiCaprio being a decade older; the role eventually went to Margot Robbie. In January 2014, Jonah Hill revealed in an interview with Howard Stern that he had made only $60,000 on the film (the lowest possible SAG-AFTRA rate for his amount of work), while DiCaprio (who also produced) received $10 million.

=== Filming ===
Filming began on August 8, 2012, in New York City. Hill announced on Twitter that his first day of shooting was September 4, 2012. Filming also took place in Closter, New Jersey, and Harrison, New York. Vitamin D powder was used as the fake substance for cocaine in the film; Hill was hospitalized with bronchitis due to snorting large quantities during filming.

Scorsese's longtime editor Thelma Schoonmaker, who has received seven Academy Award nominations (as well as one win) for Best Film Editing, said the film would be shot digitally instead of on film. Scorsese had been a proponent of shooting on film, but decided to shoot Hugo digitally because it was being photographed in 3D. Despite being filmed in 2D, The Wolf of Wall Street was originally planned to be shot digitally. Schoonmaker expressed her disappointment with the decision: "It would appear that we've lost the battle. I think Marty just feels it's unfortunately over, and there's been no bigger champion of film than him." After extensive comparison tests during pre-production, eventually the majority of the film was shot on film stock, while scenes that used green screen effects or low light (mainly the nighttime scenes) were shot with the digital Arri Alexa camera system. The film contains 400 to 450 VFX shots.

=== Profanity ===
The film set a Guinness World Record for the most instances of swearing in a motion picture. It uses the word "fuck" 569 times, (Note: Sources vary with Vulture stating 569, Slate stating 544, and other sources reporting 506 citing Wikipedia (older version of article) as their source.) "cunt" three times, "twat" twice, "fuckface" once, and "prick" four times, averaging 2.81 profanities per minute. The previous record holders were Scorsese's gangster films Goodfellas (1990) and Casino (1995), which had respectively 300 and 422 uses of the word; the 1993 film Menace II Society, which had 305 uses; the 1997 British film Nil by Mouth, which had 428; and the 1999 film Summer of Sam at 435. The record has since been broken by Swearnet: The Movie, which uses the word 935 times, but it still holds the record for a major theatrical release.

The film's distributor in the United Arab Emirates cut 45 minutes of scenes of swearing, religious profanity, drug use, sex, and nudity, and "muted" dialogue containing expletives. The National reported that filmgoers in the UAE believed the film should not have been shown rather than being edited so heavily.

== Release ==
=== Theatrical ===
The Wolf of Wall Street premiered at the Ziegfeld Theatre in New York City on December 17, 2013, followed by a wide release on December 25. Its original release date of November 15 was pushed back after cuts were made to reduce the runtime. On October 22, it was reported that the film was set for release that Christmas. On October 29, Paramount officially confirmed that the film would release on Christmas Day, with a runtime of 165 minutes. This was changed to 180 minutes on November 25. It was officially rated R by the Motion Picture Association (MPA) for "sequences of strong sexual content, graphic nudity, drug use and language throughout, and for some violence". In the United Kingdom, the film received an 18 certificate from the British Board of Film Classification (BBFC) for "very strong language, strong sex [and] hard drug use".

The film is banned in Kenya, Malaysia, Nepal, and Zimbabwe because of its scenes depicting sex and drugs and excessive profanity, and additional scenes have been cut in the versions playing in India. In Singapore, after cuts were made to a gay orgy scene as well as some religiously profane or denigrating language, the film was passed R21.

The release of The Wolf of Wall Street marked a shift in cinema history when Paramount became the first major studio to distribute movies to theaters exclusively in a digital format, eliminating 35mm film entirely. Anchorman 2: The Legend Continues was the last Paramount production to include a 35mm film version to be shown in theaters.

=== Home media ===
The Wolf of Wall Street was released on DVD and Blu-ray on March 25, 2014. On January 27, 2014, it was announced that a four-hour director's cut would be attached to the home release. Paramount later announced that the home release would feature only the original theatrical version. A 4K Ultra HD Blu-ray was released on December 14, 2021.

== Reception ==
=== Box office ===
The Wolf of Wall Street grossed $116.9 million in the United States and Canada, and $289 million internationally, for a worldwide total of $406.9 million; it is Scorsese's highest-grossing film.

In the United States, the film finished in fifth place in its first weekend with $19.4 million from 3,387 theaters, for a five-day total of $34.2 million. The film made $13.2 million (a drop of 27.9%) and $8.8 million (33%) in its second and third weekends, finishing in fourth place both times.

In Australia, it was the highest grossing R-rated film, earning $12.96 million.

=== Critical response ===
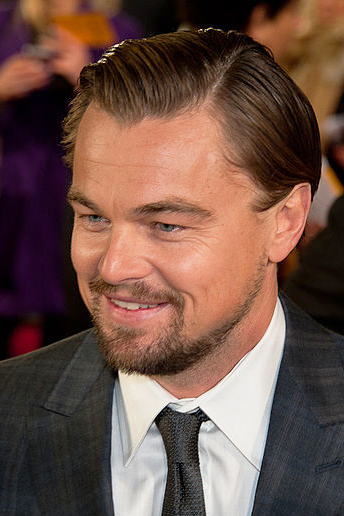
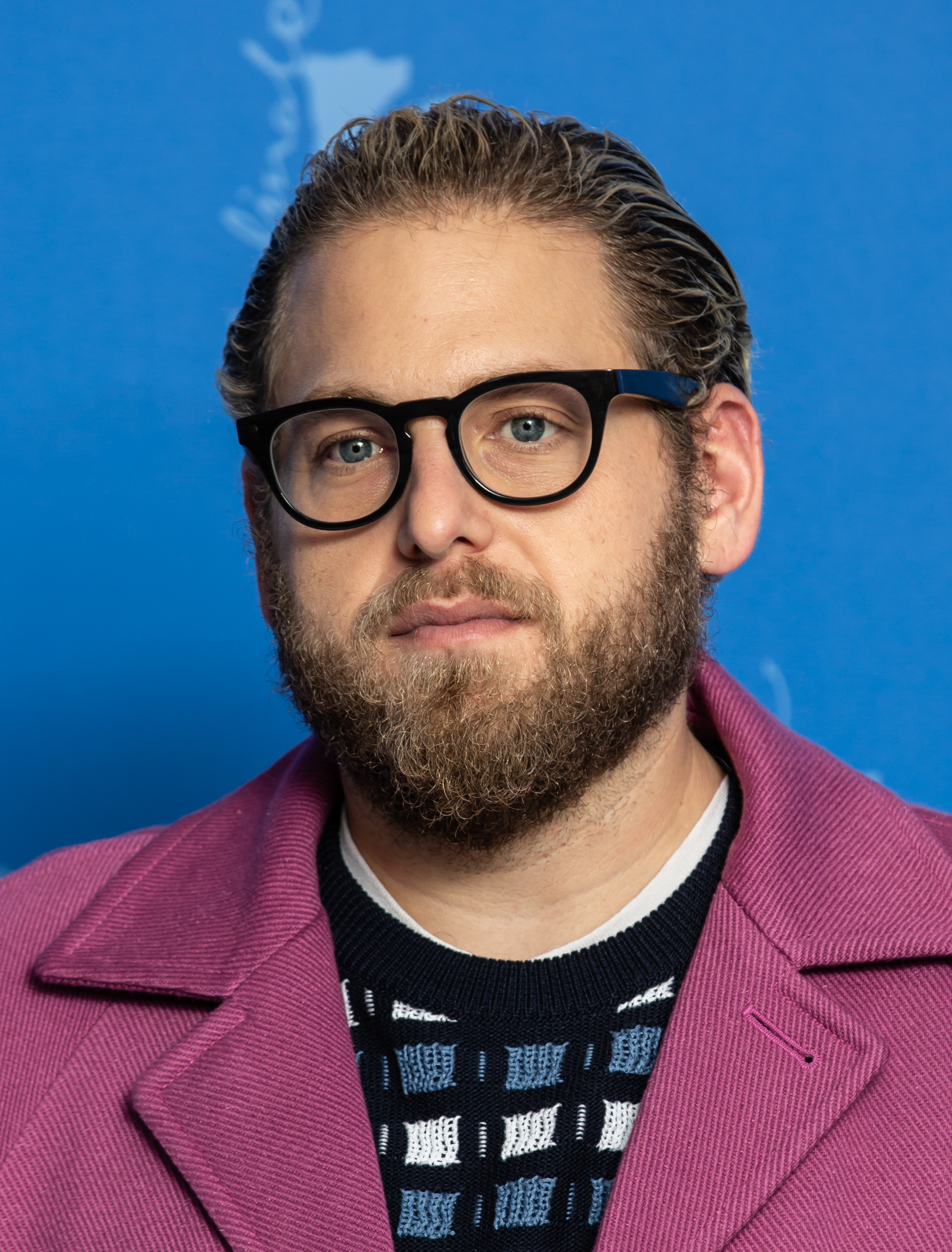
The performances of Leonardo DiCaprio and Jonah Hill garnered critical acclaim, earning them Academy Award nominations for Best Actor and Best Supporting Actor respectively.

On the review aggregator website Rotten Tomatoes, 79% of 283 critics' reviews are positive, with an average rating of 7.9/10. The website's consensus reads: "Funny, self-referential, and irreverent to a fault, The Wolf of Wall Street finds Martin Scorsese and Leonardo DiCaprio at their most infectiously dynamic." Metacritic, which uses a weighted average, assigned the film a score of 75 out of 100, based on 47 critics, indicating "generally favorable" reviews.

Peter Travers of Rolling Stone magazine named The Wolf of Wall Street as the third-best movie of 2013, behind 12 Years a Slave and Gravity. Mick LaSalle of the San Francisco Chronicle wrote, "it is the best and most enjoyable American film to be released this year." Richard Brody of The New Yorker called the film "Olympian", saying that if it was Scorsese's last film it "would rank among the most harshly awe-inspiring farewells of the cinema." The Chicago Sun-Times's Richard Roeper gave the film a B+, calling it "good, not great Scorsese".

Dana Stevens of Slate was more critical, calling the film "epic in size, claustrophobically narrow in scope." Marshall Fine of The Huffington Post argued that the story "wants us to be interested in characters who are dull people to start with, made duller by their delusions of being interesting because they are high". Some critics viewed the film as an irresponsible glorification of Belfort and his associates rather than a satirical takedown. DiCaprio defended the film, arguing that it does not glorify the excessive lifestyle it depicts.

In 2016, the film was ranked No. 78 on the BBC's 100 Greatest Films of the 21st Century list. In 2017, Richard Brody named The Wolf of Wall Street the second-best film of the 21st century so far, behind Jean-Luc Godard's In Praise of Love. In 2019, Brody named The Wolf of Wall Street the best film of the 2010s. In 2021, members of Writers Guild of America West (WGAW) and Writers Guild of America, East (WGAE) voted its screenplay 63rd in WGA’s 101 Greatest Screenplays of the 21st Century (So Far). In 2025, the film ranked number 20 on The New York Times' list of "The 100 Best Movies of the 21st Century" and number 54 on the "Readers' Choice" edition of the list.

=== Audience response ===
The film received an average grade of "C" on an A+ to F scale from audiences surveyed by CinemaScore, the lowest rating of any film opening that week. The Los Angeles Times suggested that the film's marketing may have attracted conservative viewers who expected a more moralistic tone than the film presents.

Christina McDowell, daughter of Tom Prousalis, who worked closely with Belfort at Stratton Oakmont, wrote an open letter to Scorsese, DiCaprio, and Belfort, criticizing the film for insufficiently portraying the victims of Stratton Oakmont's financial crimes, disregarding the damage done to her family as a result, and giving celebrity status to people (Belfort and his partners, including her father) who do not deserve it.

Steven Perlberg of Business Insider saw an advance screening of the film at a Regal Cinemas near the Goldman Sachs building with an audience of finance workers. Perlberg reported cheers from the audience at what he considered all the wrong moments, writing, "When Belfort—a drug addict attempting to remain sober—rips up a couch cushion to get to his secret coke stash, there were cheers."

Former Assistant United States Attorney Joel M. Cohen, who prosecuted Belfort, criticized both the film and the book on which it is based. He said that he believes some of Belfort's claims were "invented": for instance, Belfort "aggrandized his importance and reverence for him by others at his firm." He strongly criticized the film for not depicting the "thousands of victims who lost hundreds of millions of dollars", not accepting the filmmakers' argument that it would have diverted attention from the wrongdoers. He deplored the ending—"beyond an insult" to Belfort's victims—in which the real Belfort appears, while showing "a large sign advertising the name of Mr. Belfort's real motivational speaking company", and a positive depiction of Belfort uttering "variants of the same falsehoods he trained others to use against his victims".

=== Top ten lists ===
The Wolf of Wall Street was listed on many critics' top ten lists for films released in 2013, and was chosen as one of the top ten films of the year by the American Film Institute. Metacritic analysis found the film was the ninth-most mentioned film on "best of the year" film rankings and the 22nd-most mentioned on "best of the decade" film rankings.

- 1st – Sasha Stone, Awards Daily
- 1st – Stephen Schaefer, Boston Herald
- 1st – Richard Brody, The New Yorker (tied with To the Wonder)

- 2nd – Wesley Morris, Grantland
- 2nd – Mick LaSalle, San Francisco Chronicle
- 2nd – Ben Kenigsberg, The A.V. Club

- 3rd – James Berardinelli, Reelviews
- 3rd – MTV
- 3rd – Glenn Kenny, RogerEbert.com
- 3rd – Peter Travers, Rolling Stone
- 3rd – Emanuel Levy, Indiewire

- 4th – Scott Feinberg, The Hollywood Reporter
- 4th – Drew McWeeny, HitFix
- 4th – Yahoo! Movies
- 4th – Christopher Orr, The Atlantic
- 4th – Barbara Vancheri, Pittsburgh Post-Gazette

- 5th – Caryn James, Indiewire
- 5th – Stephen Holden, The New York Times
- 5th – Rex Reed, The New York Observer
- 5th – Katey Rich, Vanity Fair
- 5th – David Chen, /Film

- 6th – TV Guide

- 7th – Matt Zoller Seitz, RogerEbert.com
- 7th – Film School Rejects
- 7th – Todd McCarthy, The Hollywood Reporter
- 7th – Scott Tobias, The Dissolve
- 7th – Scott Mantz, Access Hollywood
- 7th – Mark Mohan, The Oregonian
- 7th – Sam Adams, The A.V. Club

- 8th – Nathan Rabin, The Dissolve
- 8th – Bill Goodykoontz, Arizona Republic
- 8th – Randy Myers, San Jose Mercury News

- 9th – Joe Neumaier, New York Daily News

- 10th – Andrew O'Hehir, Salon.com
- 10th – Jessica Kiang and Katie Walsh, Indiewire
- 10th – A.O. Scott, The New York Times
- 10th – Rene Rodriguez, Miami Herald
- 10th – Marjorie Baumgarten, Austin Chronicle
- 10th – Keith Uhlich, Time Out New York

- Top 10 – (unranked top 10 lists)
- Top 10 – James Verniere, Boston Herald
- Top 10 – Stephen Whitty, The Star-Ledger
- Top 10 – Joe Williams, St. Louis Post-Dispatch

== Controversies ==
=== Use of animals ===
The Wolf of Wall Street uses animals, including a chimpanzee, a lion, a snake, a fish, and dogs. The chimpanzee and the lion were provided by the Big Cat Habitat wildlife sanctuary in Sarasota County, Florida. The four-year-old chimpanzee Chance spent time with DiCaprio and learned to roller skate in three weeks. The sanctuary also provided a lion named Handsome because the trading company depicted in the film used a lion as its symbol. Danny Porush denied that there were any animals in the office, although he admitted to eating an employee's goldfish.

In December 2013, before the film premiered, the organization Friends of Animals criticized the use of the chimpanzee and organized a boycott of the film. Variety reported, "Friends of Animals thinks the chimp ... suffered irreversible psychological damage after being forced to act." The Guardian commented on the increasing criticism of Hollywood's use of animals, writing, "The Wolf of Wall Street's use of a chimpanzee arrives as Hollywood comes under ever-increasing scrutiny for its employment of animals on screen". PETA also launched a campaign to highlight mistreatment of ape actors and to petition for DiCaprio not to work with great apes.

=== 1MDB scandal ===
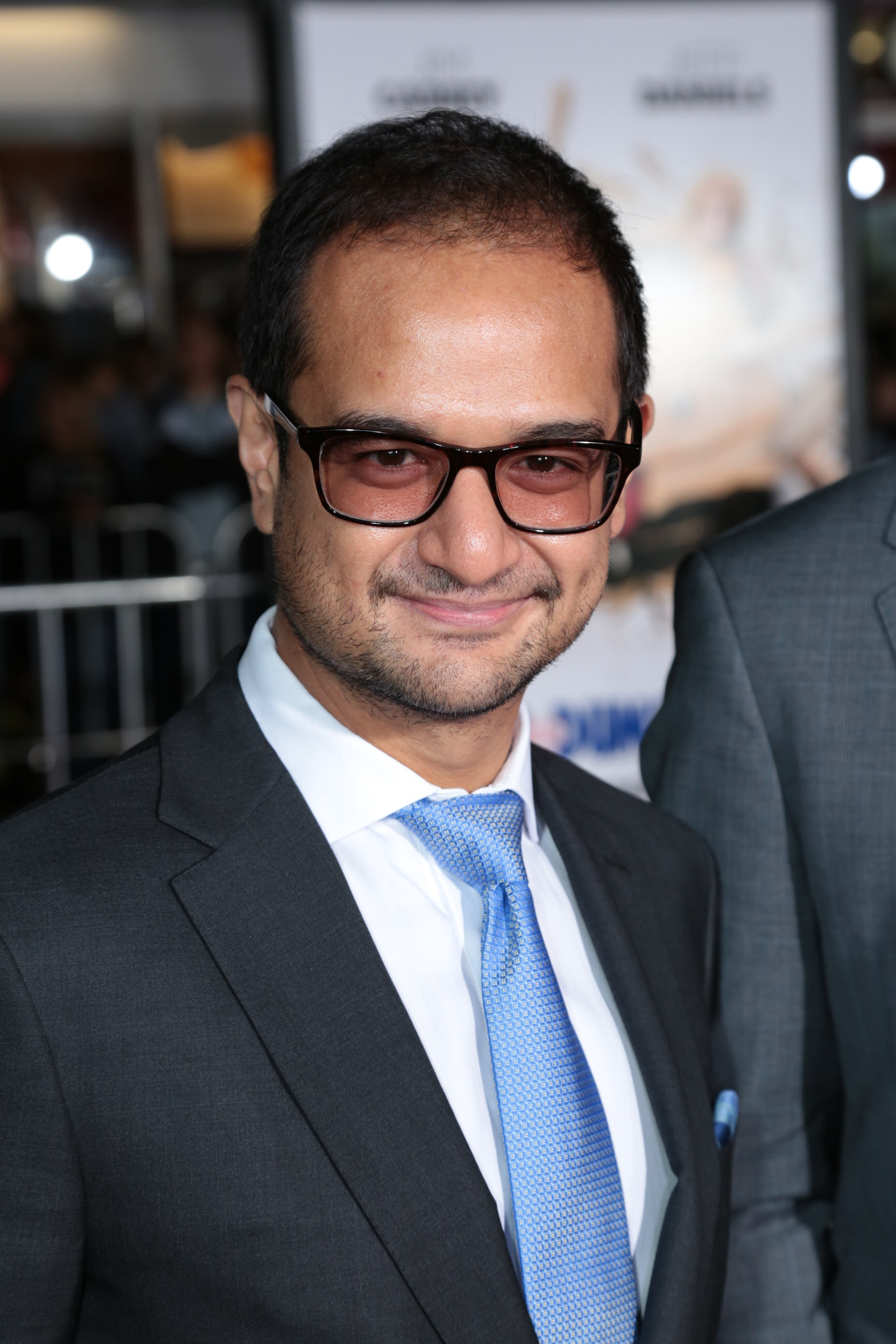
Producer Riza Aziz was arrested in 2019 over allegation that financing was connected to the 1Malaysia Development Berhad scandal in which his stepfather Najib Razak, former Prime Minister of Malaysia was also implicated

In 2015, Red Granite Pictures and the film's financing became implicated in the 1Malaysia Development Berhad scandal, a major international corruption scandal that began in Malaysia. The Malaysian Anti-Corruption Commission (MACC) alleged the film was financed by money producer Riza Aziz stole from the Malaysian 1Malaysia Development Berhad (1MDB) sovereign wealth fund. Aziz is the stepson of then-Malaysian Prime Minister Najib Razak. Aziz was arrested in connection with the scandal and pleaded not guilty to money laundering charges in July 2019. According to court filings, a company owned by fugitive businessman Jho Low gave the film's producers a $9 million advance. Low was given a "special thanks" in the film's credits.

The film is part of a broader investigation into these illicit monetary movements, and in 2016 was named in a series of civil complaints the United States Department of Justice filed "for having provided a trust account through which hundreds of millions of dollars belonging to the 1MDB fund were illicitly siphoned". To settle the civil lawsuit, Red Granite Pictures agreed to pay the U.S. government $60 million with no "admission of wrongdoing or liability on the part of Red Granite". This settlement was part of a more expansive U.S. effort to seize approximately $1.7 billion in assets allegedly purchased with funds embezzled from 1MDB. In January 2020, Belfort sued Red Granite for $300 million, also wishing to void his rights deal; he said that he would never have sold the rights to Red Granite if he had known how the film was being financed. Aziz was discharged in May 2020 on a 1,000,000 Malaysian ringgit (US$240,000) bail.

=== Thematic controversy and debate ===
Various people have criticized the film as materialistic, encouraging greedy behavior, extreme wealth, and advocating for the infamous individuals portrayed in the film. Christina McDowell, whose father, Tom Prousalis, worked in association with Belfort, accused the filmmakers of "exacerbating our national obsession with wealth and status and glorifying greed and psychopathic behavior". She emphasized the gravity and significance of Belfort's crimes, saying that Wolf of Wall Street is a "reckless attempt at continuing to pretend that these sorts of schemes are entertaining, even as the country is reeling from yet another round of Wall Street scandals".

After DiCaprio defended himself from criticism, Variety journalist Whitney Friedlander called the film "three hours of cash, drugs, hookers, repeat" and argued that the film is a "celebration of this lifestyle" and implies that short-lived extreme wealth and extraordinary experiences are superior to normal behavior.

Nikole TenBrink, vice president of marketing and membership at Risk and Insurance Management Society, has said the film is a "cautionary tale of what can happen when fraud is left unchecked". She describes Belfort's business acumen, his talent in communicating and selling his ideas, and his ability to motivate others as offering "valuable lessons for risk professionals as they seek to avoid similar pitfalls".

=== Belfort's reaction ===
Belfort said of the film's depiction of himself and Stratton Oakmont that it did an excellent job at describing the "overall feeling" of those years, adding, "the camaraderie, the insanity, that was accurate". Of his drug use, Belfort said that his actual habits were "much worse" than is depicted in the film and that he was "on 22 different drugs at the end".

Belfort also analyzed the inaccuracies in the film's oversimplification of Stratton Oakmont's gradual transition from advocating for "speculative stocks" to "help build America" to committing crimes. He said he "didn't like hearing" overly simplified and blunt depictions of his crimes because "it made me look like I was just trying to rip people off". However, Belfort did acknowledge the cinematic benefits of these oversimplifications as "a very easy way in three hours" to "move the audience emotionally".

=== Nadine Macaluso's reaction ===
On September 28, 2022, Nadine Macaluso, Belfort's ex-wife on whom the character Naomi was based, said that the depiction of Belfort and their relationship was accurate and that she hopes to educate people on signs of domestic abuse and toxic relationships.

== Accolades ==
The film was nominated for five Academy Awards: Best Picture, Best Director for Scorsese, Best Adapted Screenplay for Winter, Best Actor for DiCaprio, and Best Supporting Actor for Hill. It was also nominated for four BAFTAs, including Best Director, Best Actor and Best Adapted Screenplay, and two Golden Globe Awards, including Best Motion Picture – Musical or Comedy. DiCaprio won the Golden Globe Award for Best Actor – Motion Picture Musical or Comedy.

== Soundtrack ==
The film's soundtrack features both original and preexisting music tracks. It was released on December 17, 2013, for digital download. More than 60 songs are used in the film, but only 16 are on the official soundtrack. Among the notable exceptions are original compositions by Theodore Shapiro.

== See also ==
- The Wolf of Wall Street (1929 film)
- Scam 1992
- The Big Bull
- Boiler Room (film)
- Gordon Gekko
- Microcap stock fraud
- List of films that most frequently use the word fuck
