= Ira Sorkin =

American attorney (born 1943)

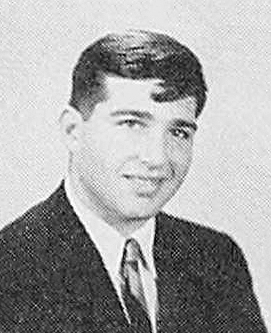
- University yearbook portrait, 1964
- Born: Ira Lee Sorkin; May 30, 1943 (age 83)
- Education: Tulane University (BA); George Washington University (JD)
- Occupation: Attorney
- Known for: Representing Bernie Madoff

Ira Lee Sorkin (born May 30, 1943) is an American attorney. He is best known for representing Bernard Madoff, the American businessman who pleaded guilty to perpetrating the largest investor fraud ever committed by a single person.

== Early life and education ==
Sorkin grew up in a Jewish family in Manhasset, New York, and graduated from Manhasset High School in 1961. He was president of his senior class, starting center on the football team, and the star shot putter of the track and field team. He received his B.A. from Tulane University (where he competed on a track scholarship) in 1965 and his J.D. from The George Washington University Law School in 1968.

== Career ==
Sorkin began his legal career as a summer intern in the office of the District Attorney for Brooklyn, New York, in 1966 followed by a second summer internship in the United States Attorney's office in Manhattan in 1967. When he graduated law school, his first job was as a trial attorney in New York with the U.S. Securities and Exchange Commission. Thereafter, Mr. Sorkin served as an Assistant U.S. Attorney and then Deputy Chief of the Criminal Division of the U.S. Attorney's Office for the Southern District of New York in the 1970s. From 1984 to 1986 he worked as the Director of the SEC's New York office. In 1995 and 1996, he also served as the Chief Legal Officer of Nomura Securities, a member firm of the New York Stock Exchange. In 1997, he became a defense attorney.

While in the United States Attorney's Office:

I tried 15 cases in 11 months. ... In those days, we tried everything—stolen mail cases, food stamp cases. These days, if you're prosecutor for five years, you might get to try five cases.

One of his first private clients was Rupert Murdoch in the law firm of Howard Squadron, Theodore Ellenoff and Stanley Plesent. When the firm merged, he joined as a partner at Carter Ledyard & Milburn. Thereafter in 2004, Mr. Sorkin joined the New York Office of Dickstein Shapiro, a large American law firm.^{[1]} On November 8, 2010, Mr. Sorkin left Dickstein Shapiro along with four other lawyers to join New Jersey–based law firm Lowenstein Sandler as a partner.

Among many clients in his career, Sorkin represented Stratton Oakmont and Jordan Belfort ("Wolf of Wall Street"). Between 1991 and 1996, Sorkin defended Monzer al-Kassar, a Syrian convicted in November 2008 of supplying arms to undercover agents posing as anti-American terrorists.^{[2]} Thereafter, he represented Bernard Madoff.

Sorkin is currently a partner at Mintz & Gold LLP, a full-service New York City–based law firm. Sorkin was a partner at Lowenstein Sandler and left to form his own law firm, Sorkin & Sondhi LLP, with his legal partner, Amit Sondhi. On November 3, 2015, Sorkin merged his firm, Sorkin & Sondhi LLP, with Mintz & Gold LLP.

== Bernard Madoff ==
Howard Squadron and several other partners invested with Bernard Madoff, and the firm's pension account, including about $19,000 belonging to Sorkin. Sorkin's parents had about $900,000 invested with Madoff in more than one account; these were liquidated following the death of Ira's mother in 2007, long before the fraud became known, with the proceeds distributed to Sorkin's two grown sons.

Sorkin was the lead defense attorney on the Madoff fraud case, assisted by associates Daniel J. Horwitz, Nicole P. De Bello and Mauro M. Wolfe, who had changed firms along with him when he joined Dickstein Shapiro. On March 20, 2009, an appellate court denied Sorkin's request to release Madoff from incarceration to "penthouse arrest" pending the latter's June 2009 scheduled sentencing date.

=== SEC v. Avellino and Bienes ===
In November 1992, Sorkin represented two accountants, Frank J. Avellino and Michael S. Bienes of Fort Lauderdale. Bienes began his career working as an accountant for Madoff's father-in-law, Saul Alpern, after which he became a partner in the accounting firm of Alpern, Avellino and Bienes. In 1962, the firm began advising its clients about investing all of their money with a mystery man, a highly successful and controversial figure on Wall Street, but until this episode, not known as an ace money manager. The "mystery man" was Bernard Madoff.

When Alpern retired at the end of 1974, the firm became Avellino and Bienes, and continued to invest solely with Madoff.

Avellino & Bienes were accused of selling unregistered securities. In its report, the SEC mentioned the fund's "curiously steady" yearly returns to investors of 13.5% to 20%. However, the SEC did not look any more deeply into the matter, and never publicly disclosed Madoff. Through Sorkin, who once oversaw the SEC's New York office, Avellino & Bienes agreed to return the money to investors, shut down their firm, undergo an audit, and pay a fine of $350,000. Avellino complained to the presiding Federal Judge, John E. Sprizzo, that Price Waterhouse fees were excessive, but the judge ordered him to pay the bill of $428,679 in full. Madoff said that he did not realize the feeder fund was operating illegally, and that his own investment returns tracked the previous 10 years of the S&P 500. The SEC investigation came during Madoff's three terms as the powerful chairman of the NASDAQ stock market board.

The size of the pools mushroomed by word-of-mouth, and investors grew to 3,200 in nine accounts with Madoff. Regulators feared it all might be just a huge scam. "We went into this thinking it could be a major catastrophe. They took in nearly a half a billion dollars in investor money, totally outside the system that we can monitor and regulate. That's pretty frightening." said Richard Walker, at the time, the SEC's New York regional administrator. The case number is: SEC v. Avellino & Bienes et al., Lit. Rel. No. 13443 (Nov. 27, 1992).

After Madoff's 2009 arrest, Bienes explained that not only had he deposited $454 million of investors' money with Madoff, until 2007 he'd continued to invest several million dollars of his own. "Doubt Bernie Madoff? Doubt Bernie? No. You doubt God. You can doubt God, but you don't doubt Bernie. He had that aura about him." Struggling to stay financially afloat, Bienes put his $6.7 million mansion in the exclusive Bay Colony of Ft. Lauderdale for sale. Bienes died in 2017.

=== SEC v. Telfran Ltd. ===
Sorkin also represented accountants Steven Mendelow of New York City and Edward Glantz of Lake Worth, Fla., who in 1989 began their own pool, Telfran Ltd., investing in Avellino & Bienes, and sold $89.6 million in unregistered notes. They were charged in a separate SEC civil lawsuit alleging that Telfran made money by investing in Avellino & Bienes notes paying 15% to 19% annually, while paying Telfran investors lower rates. All funds were ordered by the SEC to be returned to the investors. The case is: Civil Action No. 92·8564, SDNY (LR·13463)

Mr. Mendelow was also subpoenaed in the Madoff Scandal; his lawyer, Stanley S. Arkin, said Mendelow was cooperating, having engaged in no wrongdoing. "I don't think he has done anything to promote Mr. Madoff since the 1992, 1993 decree," said Arkin.

== Philanthropy ==
Sorkin is a former Chairman of the Board and President of the American Friends of the Hebrew University, and a member of the university’s Board of Governors and Executive Committee. For many years, Mr. Sorkin has been a tutor for underprivileged inner-city elementary school students. In 2010 Mr. Sorkin was awarded an Honorary Doctorate by the Hebrew University of Jerusalem. Through ads and testimonials, he helps to promote tourism to Israel.
