= Hunter Wise Financial Group =

- Industry: Financial services
- Founded: 1999 in Irvine, California, United States
- Founder: Fred Jager
- Defunct: 2015
- Fate: Closed
- Key people: Teresa Hinojos (President)
- Subsidiaries: Hunter Wise Securities
- Website: www.hunterwise.com

Hunter Wise Financial Group was an American financial institution that acted as a penny stock broker-dealer providing investment banking services including M&A transactions, debt placement and equity formation to small-cap public and medium-sized privately owned businesses. The company was based in Irvine, California until it was closed in 2015.

While it was operating the firm was regulated in the United States by the Financial Industry Regulatory Authority (FINRA) and Securities Investor Protection Corporation (SIPC).

The company had fifteen U.S. locations and two international offices in Beijing and London.

== History ==
Fred Jager founded Hunter Wise in 1999. The firm advised on penny stock, recapitalizations, equity investments, and acquisitions.

== Awards and recognition ==
In 2011, Hunter Wise Financial Group was nominated at the 10th Annual M&A Awards for Lower Middle-Market Deal of the Year, Cross-Border Deal of the Year, and Industrial Goods and Basic Resources categories for its work with Farm Lands of Guinea.
