= Nadine Macaluso =

American psychologist

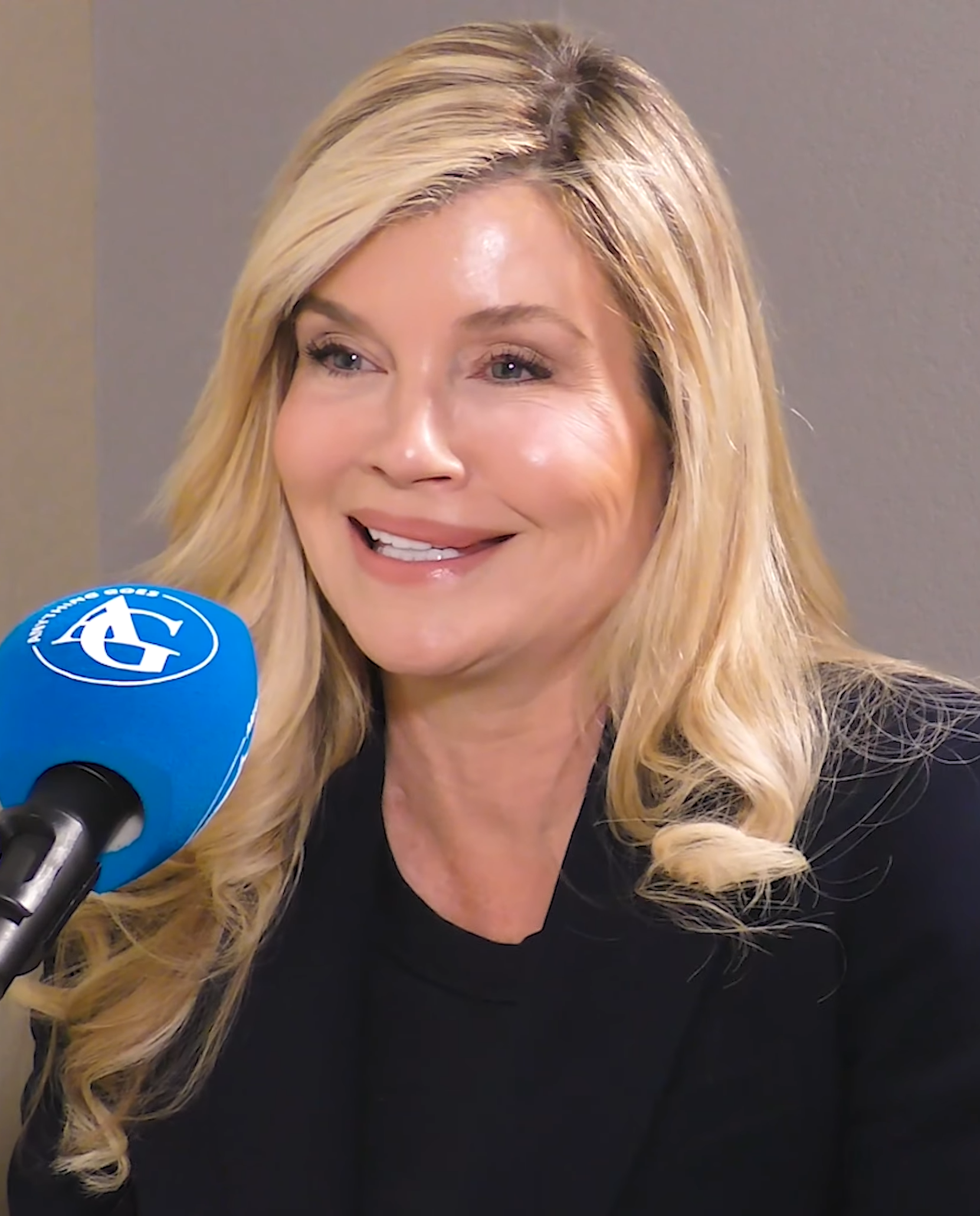
- Macaluso in 2024
- Born: Nadine Caridi; 1968 (age 57–58); London, England
- Other name: Nadine Belfort
- Education: Pacifica Graduate Institute
- Occupations: Psychotherapist, writer, internet personality
- Spouses: Jordan Belfort (m. 1991; div. 2005): John Macaluso
- Children: 2

TikTok information
- Page: drnaelmft
- Followers: 344.6K
- Last updated: October 24, 2026
- Website: drnae.com

Nadine Macaluso (née Caridi, formerly Belfort; born 1968) is a British-born American psychotherapist, author, internet personality, and former model. She was the second wife of the stockbroker and financial criminal Jordan Belfort, to whom she was married from 1991 to 2005. Throughout her marriage, she was referred to in the press as the "Duchess of Bay Ridge".

Macaluso's marriage to Belfort was one of the subjects of Belfort's 2007 memoir, The Wolf of Wall Street, and the basis of Margot Robbie's character Naomi Lapaglia in the 2013 film The Wolf of Wall Street. Macaluso authored the book Run Like Hell: A Therapist's Guide To Recognizing, Escaping, And Healing From Trauma Bonds.

== Biography ==
Macaluso was born as Nadine Caridi in London. She grew up in Bay Ridge, Brooklyn, and graduated from John Dewey High School.

She worked as a model, represented by Elite Petite Management, and appeared in advertisement campaigns for Miller Lite. In 1992, she was featured in an advertisement campaign for Seagram that promoted the 1992 Winter Olympics. Macaluso also modelled for the Wrigley Company.

Macaluso met her first husband, stockbroker Jordan Belfort, at a house party in Westhampton Beach, New York. Belfort, who had previously been married to Denise Lombardo, ran the brokerage house Stratton Oakmont. They married in 1991. She and Belfort had two children. The couple owned a luxury yacht, originally built in 1961 for Coco Chanel, that Belfort renamed Nadine after Macaluso. The yacht sank off the east coast of Sardinia in June 1996. Due to their high-profile and extravagant life style, Macaluso was referred to as the "Duchess of Bay Ridge" by the press. Belfort, who was arrested for charges involving white-collar crime, attempted to launder millions of dollars through a Swiss bank account using the name of Macaluso's aunt. While they were married, Macaluso founded a maternity company.

The relationship between Macaluso and Belfort was contentious. Belfort reportedly flew 100 staff and 100 sex workers to Las Vegas for a bachelor party before their £600,000 Caribbean wedding. Belfort later bragged about having sex with Macaluso on a $3 million mattress with $100 bills.

Macaluso and Belfort separated after Macaluso made claims of domestic violence after he reportedly kicked her down the stairs of their Long Island mansion, and accused Belfort of infidelity and suffering from a drug addiction. The couple divorced in 2005. Following the divorce, she moved to California.

She remarried to businessman John Macaluso. She earned a master's degree and a doctoral degree in counseling and somatic psychology from the Pacifica Graduate Institute. She works as a therapist in marriage and family counseling.

Macaluso began using the social media platform TikTok to share her perspective on the 2013 Martin Scorsese biographical black comedy film The Wolf of Wall Street, as she was the inspiration for the film's character Naomi Lapaglia, played by Margot Robbie. She met with Robbie and Robbie's speech coach during the making of the film.

Macaluso also uses her TikTok platform to educate women on abusive relationships and emotionally manipulative behavior like gaslighting and traumatic bonding.
