= 70 Million Jobs =

Former employment website

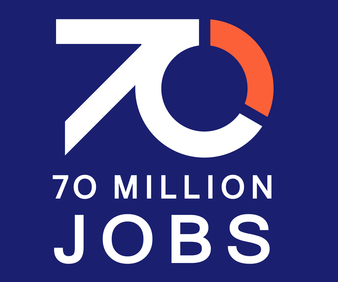
- Company type: Private
- Industry: Employment agency
- Founded: October 5, 2016
- Founder: Richard Bronson
- Defunct: June 2, 2022
- Fate: Closed
- Headquarters: San Francisco, California, United States
- Key people: Richard Bronson, CEO
- Number of employees: 1-10
- Website: 70millionjobs.com

70 Million Jobs was an American for profit employment platform for people with criminal records. The company was named for the approximately 70 million people in the United States with a criminal record.

== History ==
Richard Bronson, the founder of 70 Million Jobs created the company due to his inability to find employment following his imprisonment. Bronson was incarcerated for defrauding stock accounts at his over the counter brokerage house which he founded after leaving Stratton Oakmont. The purpose of the company was aiding former felons find a job. Their method involves helping them write their résumé, and finding companies that can hire felons. The company was accepted into Y Combinator, the prestigious tech accelerator program, and received venture capital funding. It facilitated employment for thousands of system-impacted men and women. The company closed on June 2, 2022. According to Bronson, it was due to difficulties caused by the COVID-19 pandemic and The Great Resignation. Bronson stated about the collapse of the company:

"When Covid hit in force in March 2020, companies made wholesale terminations of nearly all of our people and continued their halt in hiring for two years. Companies that were hiring, like Amazon or Target, now had their choice of tens of millions of Americans without records from which to choose. Our revenue dropped like a rock to almost nothing. I immediately responded by paring our expenses to the bone and began letting team members go. There was no opportunity to raise additional funding, so I began injecting my own money into the company — money I barely had – just to keep the lights on. When the economy and job market began storming back, we were inundated with inbound requests for our services. Our perseverance seemed to be paying off. Except now we were hit with a new gut punch: 'The Great Resignation.' Now our workers were reticent to come back to work. And if they did accept a job, they’d often leave after only a few days. It became obvious that we lacked the resources to weather this new storm."
