= Lloyd, Carr & Company =

U.S. commodities options brokerage firm

Lloyd, Carr & Company was a Boston based commodities options brokerage firm. It was put in receivership in January 1978 after major fraud was discovered.

The company was formed in mid-1976 by James A. Carr with $2,000. (There was no one connected with the firm by the name of Lloyd. Carr thought people might associate the company with Lloyd's of London.) It grew in 18 months to include 12 offices and 700 employees, with annual sales of $50 million. The company sold commodities options on London exchanges using boiler room tactics, including cold calling and high pressure sales. The company charged commissions of up to 500% and misled investors about risks. Lloyd Carr sometimes have not actually bought the options, but kept the money. An estimated 97% of investors lost money, with total estimated losses to customers of $28 million. Carr sent about $5 million to $8 million of the funds to foreign bank accounts he controlled. Throughout 1977, the Commodity Futures Trading Commission took legal action against the company, and an injunction was issued in December 1977. The company was placed in receivership in January 1978.

James A. Carr was arrested in January 1978 and after being fingerprinted was found to be Alan H. Abrahams, an escaped convict. He had fled a New Jersey minimum security prison in December 1974, where he was serving a four to six year sentence for fraud and writing bad checks. After his arrest in 1978, Abrahams jumped his $100,000 bail but was caught in Florida a few weeks later. In April 1978, he was sentenced to 2 1/2 years in prison for violating probation in a 1971 federal tax case. In June 1980, he pleaded guilty to seven counts of fraud in connection with the Lloyd Carr case and was sentenced to seven years in prison. His attorney was F. Lee Bailey. Abrahams was released in February 1983, but was again arrested in 1984 on charges of being a fugitive from justice from New Jersey. Five other employees of Lloyd Carr were convicted in February 1979 of mail and wire fraud.

As a result of the fraud at Lloyd Carr and similar operations, the sale of commodity options on foreign exchanges was banned by the Commodity Futures Trading Commission as of June 1, 1978.

Abrahams' name surfaced again in 1992, when it was revealed that after being jilted by a society real estate broker, he became an informant against one of the so-called Society Seven, a group of socially prominent New Yorkers involved in insider trading.
