= Langbar International =

Langbar International is a limited company that was listed on the Alternative Investment Market of the London Stock Exchange as Crown Corporation Limited in 2003 and was subsequently the biggest share fraud on the AIM to date. It was investigated by the Serious Fraud Office, the City of London Police, the Accountancy Investigation and Disciplinary Board and the subject of many civil legal actions in the High Court.

Crown Corporation, which changed its name to Langbar International Limited in 2005, was a pump and dump fraud, in that the company did not possess the assets that it declared at listing.

== History ==
Created as Crown Corporation Limited (CCL) in Bermuda, the company was listed on the Alternative Investment Market (AIM) in London in October 2003. Its purpose was purportedly buying companies that were not living up to their economic potentials and improving them before selling them at a profit. 59% of the shares in the company were purchased by Lambert Financial Investments for a total of $570 million, with $275 million presented as certificate of deposit from Banco do Brasil and $295 million to be paid later, but CCL was notified that the certificate was fraudulent and the funds were never paid. Other stockholders failed to pay for their shares. In spite of being aware of the serious financial shortcomings, CCL misled investors as to the state of its finances, including making increasingly extravagant claims about its financial activities.

In June 2005, Stuart Pearson, head of Langbar Capital. A British business executive, Pearson was brought to Brazil and presented with an elaborate deception meant to convince Pearson that the company's financial value was legitimate. The company merged with Pearson's investment firm, taking its name of Langbar International.

The value of Langbar International rose with Pearson's declarations to the market that the funds had been released from Brazil, which encouraged further investment. However, trading was suspended in October when the company's value was questioned, and in short order the company collapsed altogether.

Investors, most of whom purchased after Pearson came aboard, lost as much 100 million. Nabarro Wells, a London firm that had advised Langbar, was fined £250,000 for due diligence failures in 2007. In 2008, shareholders in Langbar International sued Rybak and his family, receiving a settlement of £30 million after 56 days of evidence.

The Serious Fraud Office was aggressively pursuing conspirators in the fraud with seven arrests in Spain and Switzerland when the man The Guardian characterized as the central conspirator, Lambert head Avi Arad, died of a heart attack. According to the Guardian, "the prospect of other potential defendants blaming Arad for the fraud was now glaring."

Given the death of Arad, the disposition of Pearson was the final stage in the investigation by the SFO. Charged with 13 counts of fraud, Pearson faced trial to determine the question of how much he knew of the fraud and when he had discovered it. Evidence was presented that Pearson had overlooked warnings, including a phone call from a banker at the London branch of Banco do Brasil informing him that there was no record of the money from Lambert. With a jury convinced of at least criminal negligence, Pearson was found guilty in 2011 on three counts, for making "misleading, false or deceptive or reckless" claims about the existence of the money. Barred from being a director for five years, he was also sentenced to a year in jail, but the SFO determined that confiscation of assets from Pearson could not be made because he had been acquitted of dishonesty, had been sentenced for recklessness, and had lost money himself.

The blatant fraud contributed to a rewriting of company requirements on the AIM.
