= Pump and dump =

Form of securities fraud

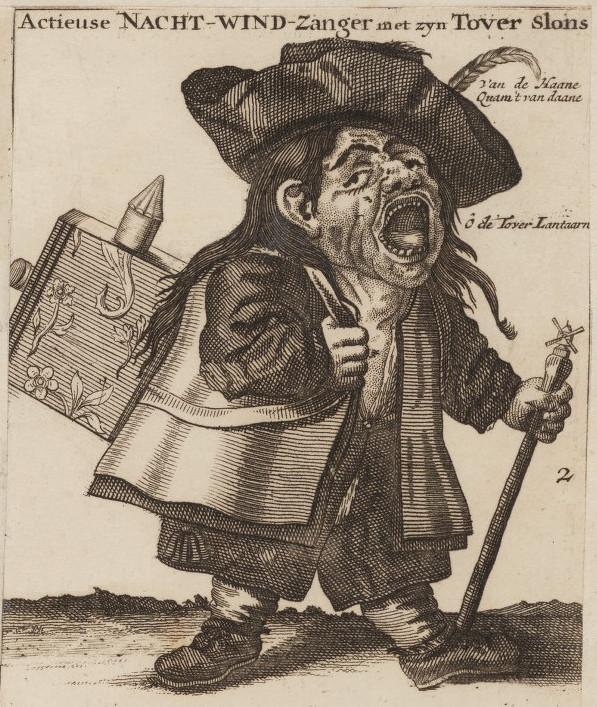
"Night wind hawkers" sold stock on the streets during the South Sea Bubble. (The Great Picture of Folly, 1720)

Pump and dump (P&D) is a form of securities fraud that involves artificially inflating the price of an owned stock through false and misleading positive statements (pump), in order to sell the cheaply purchased stock at a higher price (dump).

In a classic pump and dump, the scammer first buys lots of cheap shares in some company of little value. They then spread false information exaggerating the potential value of the company. This causes investors and speculators to buy shares in said company from other parties, causing the price of the shares to rise. When the share price has reached a level that pleases the scammer, they sell all their shares. This causes the share price to drop. When the investors and speculators realize that they overestimated the potential of these shares, they in turn sell their shares in an attempt to cut their losses, and the price drops even faster. Because the investors sold their shares for less than what they paid for them, they lose money.

While fraudsters in the past relied on cold calls, the Internet now offers a cheaper and easier way of reaching large numbers of potential investors through spam email, investment research websites, social media, and general misinformation campaigns.

== Scenarios ==
Pump-and-dump schemes occur on the Internet using an email spam campaign, through media channels via a fake press release, or through telemarketing from "boiler room" brokerage houses (such as that dramatized in the 2000 film Boiler Room). Often the stock promoter will claim to have "inside" information about impending news. Newsletters would purport to offer unbiased recommendations, then tout a company as a "hot" stock, for their own benefit. Promoters also post messages in online chat groups or internet forums, urging readers to buy the stock quickly.

If a promoter's campaign to "pump" a stock is successful, it will entice unwitting investors to purchase shares of the target company. The increased demand, price, and trading volume of the stock could convince more people to believe the hype and to buy shares as well. When the promoters behind the scheme sell (dump) their shares and stop promoting the stock, the price plummets, and other investors are left holding a stock that is worth significantly less than what they paid for it.

Fraudsters frequently use this ploy with small, thinly traded companies—known as "penny stocks", generally traded over-the-counter (in the United States, this would mean markets such as the OTC Bulletin Board or the Pink Sheets), rather than markets such as the New York Stock Exchange (NYSE) or NASDAQ—because it is easier to manipulate a stock when there is little or no independent information available about the company. The same principle applies in the United Kingdom, where target companies are typically small companies on the AIM or OFEX.

A newer spin on the attack is known as hack, pump and dump. In this form, a person purchases penny stocks and then uses compromised brokerage accounts to purchase large quantities of that stock. The net result is a price increase, often pushed further by day traders seeing a quick advance in a stock. The original stockholder then cashes out at a premium. Pump-and-dump schemes also permeate the crypto-market, targeting especially low-market-cap, illiquid coins on cryptocurrency exchanges.

== Examples ==
=== Stratton Oakmont ===
In the early 1990s, the penny-stock brokerage Stratton Oakmont artificially inflated the price of owned stock through false and misleading positive statements in order to sell the cheaply purchased stock at a higher price. Firm co-founder Jordan Belfort was criminally convicted for applying the scheme. He later turned his story into a memoir, The Wolf of Wall Street, which was later adapted into an Academy Award–nominated film of the same name.

=== Jonathan Lebed ===
During the dot-com bubble, when US stock-market fever was at its height and many people spent significant amounts of time on stock Internet message boards, a 15-year-old named Jonathan Lebed allegedly used the Internet to run a successful pump and dump. Lebed bought penny stocks and then promoted them on message boards, pointing at the price increase. Allegedly, when other investors bought the stock, Lebed sold his for a profit, leaving the other investors holding the bag. He came to the attention of the U.S. Securities and Exchange Commission (SEC), which filed a civil suit against him alleging security manipulation. Lebed settled the charges by paying a fraction of his total gains. He neither admitted nor denied wrongdoing, but promised not to manipulate securities in the future.

=== Enron ===
As late as April 2001, before Enron collapsed, executives at the company participated in an elaborate pump and dump scheme. Studies of the anonymous messages posted on the Yahoo board dedicated to Enron revealed predictive messages that it was akin to a house of cards, had "fooled even the most sophisticated analysts", and that investors should bail out while the stock was good. After Enron falsely reported profits, which inflated the stock price, they covered the real numbers by using questionable accounting practices. Twenty-nine Enron executives sold overvalued stock for more than a billion dollars before the company went bankrupt.

=== Park Financial Group and International Media Solutions, LLC ===
Park Financial Group, Spear & Jackson, and International Media Solutions, LLC were involved in a pump-and-dump scheme where the price per share increased by $14.00 and over 100,000 shares were traded each day, netting Spear & Jackson around $3 million in profits. In 2005, Spear & Jackson and International Media Solutions were fined over $8 million, and its two executive officers, Kermit J. Silva and Yolanda Velazquez, each paid an additional $420,000 out of their personal accounts. On December 5, 2007, Park and the company's president were ordered to pay over $113,000 in fines and penalties.

=== Langbar International ===
Started as Crown Corporation, Langbar International was the biggest pump-and-dump fraud on the Alternative Investment Market, part of the London Stock Exchange. The company was valued greater than $1 billion in 2005, based on supposed bank deposits in Brazil which did not exist. None of the chief conspirators were convicted, although their whereabouts are known. A patsy who made a negligent false statement about the assets was convicted and banned from being a director. In 2008 Langbar's founder settled a fraud lawsuit brought against him by the company's directors in the High Court in London, agreeing to pay about £30 million. He denied any wrongdoing and said the fraud had been committed by others.

=== Morrie Tobin ===
In April 2018, Morrie Tobin and others, using offshore accounts, gained over $165 million from a pump-and-dump scheme. When questioned by federal agents, Tobin told the agents that he was involved in another scheme implicating a soccer coach from Yale University, which in turn led to the 2019 college admissions bribery scandal. In February 2019, Tobin pled guilty to conspiracy and securities fraud. On June 7, 2019, a federal judge hit Tobin with a $4 million forfeiture.

=== Cryptocurrency ===
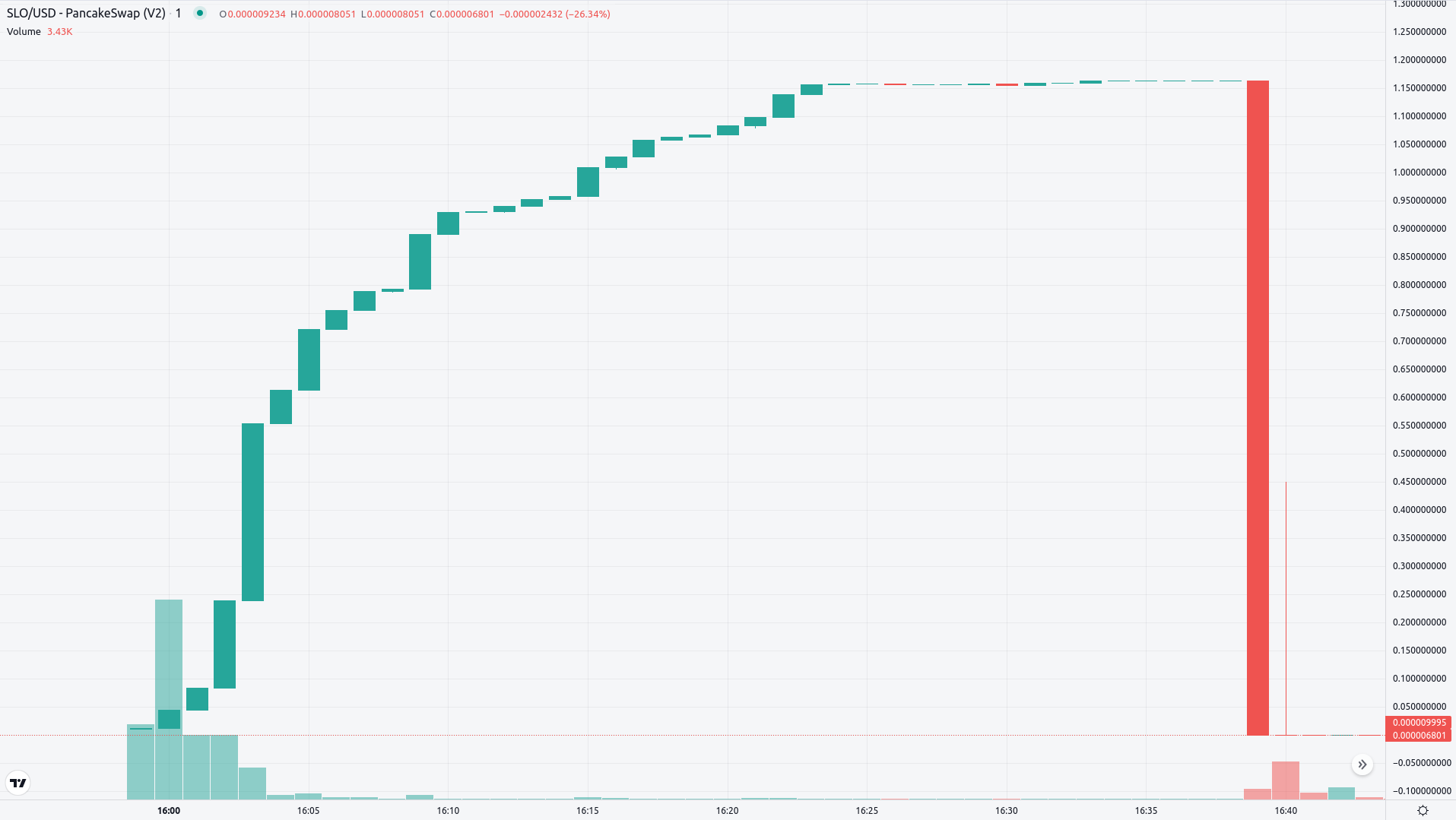
Visualisation of pump and dump scam based on SLO-BNB cryptocurrency example

Being an unregulated market, and due to the concentration of a large amount of cryptocurrency in a small number of hands, the prices of many cryptocurrencies are sensitive to pump-and-dump schemes. There are organised pump-and-dump schemes run through social media platforms including Telegram and Discord. In 2024 US prosecutors in Boston unsealed charges against eighteen individuals and entities over alleged fraud and manipulation in cryptocurrency markets. According to the charging documents, token creators made false statements and used wash trades to inflate prices before selling their tokens. In the investigation, which it named Operation Token Mirrors, the FBI created its own cryptocurrency token and company, NexFundAI. Three market makers were charged with wash trading on its behalf. In June 2025 a US district court in Massachusetts sentenced Aleksei Andriunin, founder of the cryptocurrency market maker Gotbit, to eight months in prison. He had signed a plea agreement on wire fraud and crypto market manipulation charges. Prosecutors said Gotbit had made wash trades worth millions of dollars on behalf of cryptocurrency companies to create artificial trading volume. The UAE-based market maker CLS Global was charged after an undercover operation in which US authorities created the crypto company NexFundAI. It pleaded guilty to wire fraud and conspiracy charges. A federal court in Boston sentenced the firm to three years of probation, including a ban on taking part in US cryptocurrency markets. It was also ordered to pay US$428,059 made up of a criminal fine and seized cryptocurrency.

=== Spam ===
Pump-and-dump stock scams are prevalent in spam, accounting for about 15% of spam e-mail messages. A survey of 75,000 unsolicited emails sent between January 2004 and July 2005 concluded that spammers could make an average return of 4.29% by using this method, while recipients who act on the spam message typically lose close to 5.5% of their investment within two days. A study by Böhme and Holz shows a similar effect. Stocks targeted by spam are almost always penny stocks, selling for less than $5 per share, not traded on major exchanges, thinly traded, and difficult or impossible to sell short. Spammers acquire stock before sending the messages and sell the day the message is sent.

=== Comparison with other types of schemes ===
A pump-and-dump scam is a type of economic bubble, with the main difference between this scheme and most other types of bubbles being that the pump-and-dump bubble is deliberately perpetrated by unlawful activity. A pump-and-dump scheme is similar in many ways to a Ponzi scheme (in that both types of scam use misrepresentations in an effort to enrich the promoters and/or initial investors with money from later investors), however, there are a number of differences between the schemes:

- Ponzi-type investments are privately traded, often between individuals who are known to one another, whereas pump-and-dump schemes are typically marketed to the general public and traded on public stock exchanges and the victims and perpetrators are not acquainted with each other.
- Ponzi schemes typically promise very specific returns on investments and/or include falsified records implying consistent and steady returns, whereas pump-and-dump schemes only come with general and/or implied promises of substantial profits.
- Ponzi schemes typically come with the expectation of profit over a relatively extended period and typically last for months, years or even decades before their inevitable collapse. By comparison, pump-and-dump scams are designed to make profits extremely quickly and are executed over weeks, days or even hours.
- Ponzi schemes are occasionally the result of investment vehicles that are originally intended to be legitimate but ultimately fail to perform as expected. By comparison, pump-and-dump schemes are invariably intended to be scams from their conception, although a fairly common tactic used by pump-and-dump schemers is to take over a once-legitimate business (one that is either failing or defunct), or even just its name, in order to pump and dump its stock.
- For all of the above reasons, Ponzi schemes tend to leave a far more extensive trail of evidence. They are typically much easier to prosecute after they are discovered, and often result in much stiffer criminal penalties.

Pump-and-dump scams differ from many other forms of spam (such as advance fee fraud emails and lottery scam messages) in that it does not require the recipient to contact the spammer to collect supposed "winnings", or to transfer money from supposed bank accounts. This makes tracking the source of pump-and-dump spam difficult. A growing number of stock spammers also placed their messages inside images, which text-based spam filters could not read.

== Scalping and social media ==
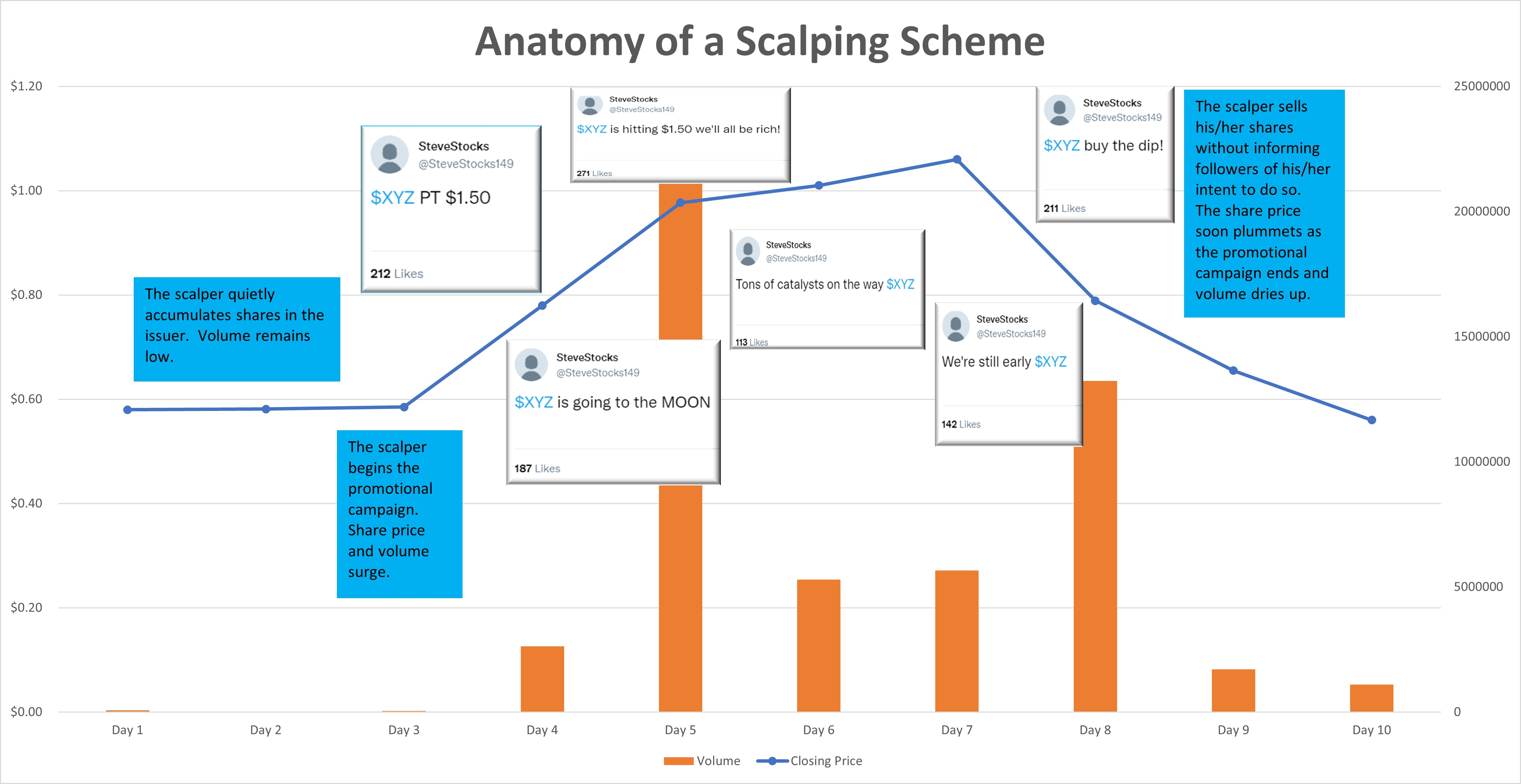
Anatomy of a scalping scheme

One variation of the pump-and-dump scam is known as "scalping." In a scalping scheme, a stock promoter takes a position in a stock and then touts the stock without disclosing his or her intent to sell the stock. By recommending the stock (often, but not always, by providing inflated price targets or more generic promises of substantial returns), the promoter convinces others to purchase the stock, providing a temporary rise in share price and volume which allows the "scalper" to then sell his shares on unsuspecting investors and obtain a profit. Scalping scams are frequently effectuated through social media (e.g., Twitter), and may lead to both criminal and civil liability in the United States. Like other pump-and-dump schemes, scalping scams frequently target microcap stocks because their low volume allows relatively small purchase volumes to cause significant spikes in the share price. Given the rise of social media, scalping scams have become a significant focus of regulators in the United States in recent years.

== Short and distort ==
Another variant of the pump-and-dump scam, the "short and distort" works in the opposite manner. Instead of first buying the stock, and then artificially raising its price before selling, in a "short and distort" the scammer first short-sells the stock, and then artificially lowers the price, using the same techniques as the pump and dump but using criticism or negative predictions regarding the stock. The scammer then covers their short position when they buy back the stock at a lower price.

== Regulation ==
One method of regulating and restricting pump-and-dump manipulators is to target the category of stocks most often associated with this scheme. To that end, penny stocks have been the target of heightened enforcement efforts.

In the United States, regulators have defined a penny stock as a security that must meet a number of specific standards. The criteria include price, market capitalization, and minimum shareholder equity. Securities traded on a national stock exchange, regardless of price, are exempt from regulatory designation as a penny stock, since it is thought that exchange-traded securities are less vulnerable to manipulation. Therefore, Citigroup (NYSE:C) and other NYSE listed securities which traded below $1.00 during the market downturn of 2008–2009, while properly regarded as "low priced" securities, were not technically "penny stocks". Although penny stock trading in the United States is now primarily controlled through rules and regulations enforced by the Securities and Exchange Commission and the Financial Industry Regulatory Authority (FINRA), the genesis of this control is found in state securities law.

The State of Georgia was the first state to codify a comprehensive penny stock securities law. Secretary of State Max Cleland, whose office enforced state securities laws, was a principal proponent of the legislation. Representative Chesley V. Morton, the only stockbroker in the Georgia General Assembly at the time, was a principal sponsor of the bill in the Georgia House of Representatives. Georgia's penny stock law was subsequently challenged in court. However, the law was eventually upheld in U.S. District Court, and the statute became the template for laws enacted in other states. Shortly thereafter, both FINRA and the SEC enacted comprehensive revisions of their penny stock regulations. These regulations proved effective in either shuttering or greatly restricting brokers/dealers, such as Blinder, Robinson & Company, which specialized in the penny stocks sector. Meyer Blinder was jailed for securities fraud in 1992, after the collapse of his firm. However, sanctions under these specific regulations lack an effective means to address pump-and-dump schemes perpetrated by unregistered groups and individuals.

== In popular culture ==
The 2000 film Boiler Room features Giovanni Ribisi as Seth Davis, a young broker who joins a firm named J.T. Marlin. The company operates as a front for a pump and dump stock fraud, in which brokers artificially inflate the price of worthless or defunct companies’ shares before selling them to unsuspecting investors.
