= Stock promoter =

A stock promoter is a firm or person who promotes a stock, seeking to induce potential investors to buy it as part of an IPO or in the secondary market.

Stock promoters may rely on cold calling prospective investors to acquire stock in a company, as well as using the Internet, which provides for a much more efficient method of promoting a stock to a wider audience.

In the United States, some stock promoters promote penny stocks because these stocks which are normally listed on the OTC Bulletin Board or Pink Sheets do not require the same reporting and disclosure rules and regulations of companies that trade on exchanges such as the NYSE. Minimal public information combined with thin or volatile trading allow penny stocks to have a greater chance for fraud and manipulation.

== See also ==
- Financial advisor
- Stockbroker
- Pump and dump
- Stock manipulation
