= Gregory Coleman (FBI special agent) =

American law enforcement officer

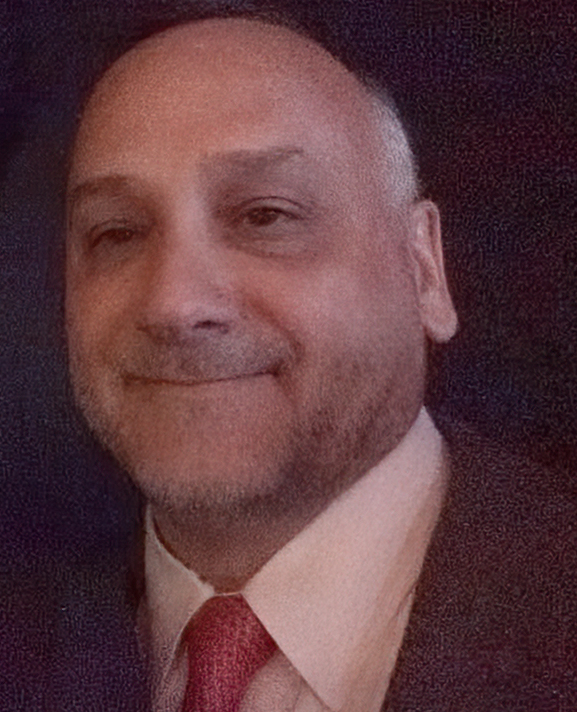
- Coleman in 2019

Personal details
- Profession: Former FBI special agent

Gregory Coleman is a former FBI special agent.

Coleman led the criminal investigation of Jordan Belfort. Belfort's meteoric rise, arrest, and conviction were depicted in the 2013 film The Wolf of Wall Street, directed by Martin Scorsese and starring Leonardo DiCaprio. In the movie, Coleman was portrayed by Kyle Chandler as FBI special agent Patrick Denham, a fictional character.

With over 25 years of experience in the FBI, Coleman specialized in financial crimes, money laundering, and asset forfeiture. His investigations frequently uncovered stock market manipulations, where illicit proceeds were funneled through offshore shell corporations and bank accounts. He was able to obtain banking records from numerous offshore jurisdictions by piercing the veil of banking secrecy laws.

== FBI career ==
Coleman joined the FBI in 1989 as a white-collar crime specialist, and by 1992, he was assigned to a Wall Street financial crime squad in New York, where he investigated cases of stock manipulation, fraud, and insider trading.

=== Criminal investigation of Jordan Belfort ===
Later in 1992, FBI received a tip from the U.S. Securities and Exchange Commission to investigate Jordan Belfort, whose stockbroking firm, Stratton Oakmont, was gaining notoriety in Wall Street circles.

Belfort had already been operating for several years and had built significant momentum in his business by the time Coleman joined the FBI. According to Coleman, from 1989 to 1992, while he was investigating other cases, Belfort was refining his fraudulent schemes, manipulation tactics, and scams within his firm.

At any given time, Coleman and his colleagues were handling around seven cases, and bringing Belfort to justice required years of meticulously analyzing financial records. From start to finish, it took Coleman and his team six years to take Belfort down. However, before reaching him, they arrested several others along the way. The investigation involved obtaining bank, brokerage, and trading records from financial regulators to track stock buy and sell prices.

In 1999, Belfort pleaded guilty to fraud and related crimes and was sentenced to 22 months in prison.

Coleman recounted later at a conference in Cayman Islands, how Belfort attempted to bribe him to derail an investigation. Belfort mockingly called him “Special Agent OCD” and tried to sway him with cash, luxury food, alcohol, and prostitutes. However, Coleman and his colleague refused the bribe. Realizing his attempt had failed, Belfort became frustrated and ordered them off his boat—ending the encounter by throwing lobsters at Coleman.

== Coleman Worldwide Advisors ==
After his retirement from FBI, he leads Coleman Worldwide Advisors which provides litigation support, funds recovery assistance, and financial consultancy services related to complex financial transactions and systems.

Coleman Worldwide Advisors develops and delivers tailored, highly interactive live training focused on detecting and preventing money laundering, as well as suspicious activity reporting. The sessions feature real-world case studies drawn from experiences and insights from Coleman and other law enforcement professionals.

== Speaker and lecturer ==
He serves as a keynote speaker and guest lecturer and has delivered presentations in 14 countries, often utilizing simultaneous translation in topic include: The "Wolf of Wall Street" Investigation – An inside look at the case from an FBI agent's perspective; Body Language & Statement Analysis – Understanding and using body language in everyday interactions; Money Laundering – Case studies on identifying and preventing illicit financial activities; Terrorism Financing – Insights into how terrorist organizations are funded and what we know about their financial networks; and Bitcoin – Separating fact from hype in the world of cryptocurrency.

== Awards ==
He was highly regarded as an anti-money laundering expert among his law enforcement peers and was honored with the "Director's Award for Outstanding Contributions in Law Enforcement" from the Executive Office for United States Attorneys).
