= Chesley V. Morton =

American politician

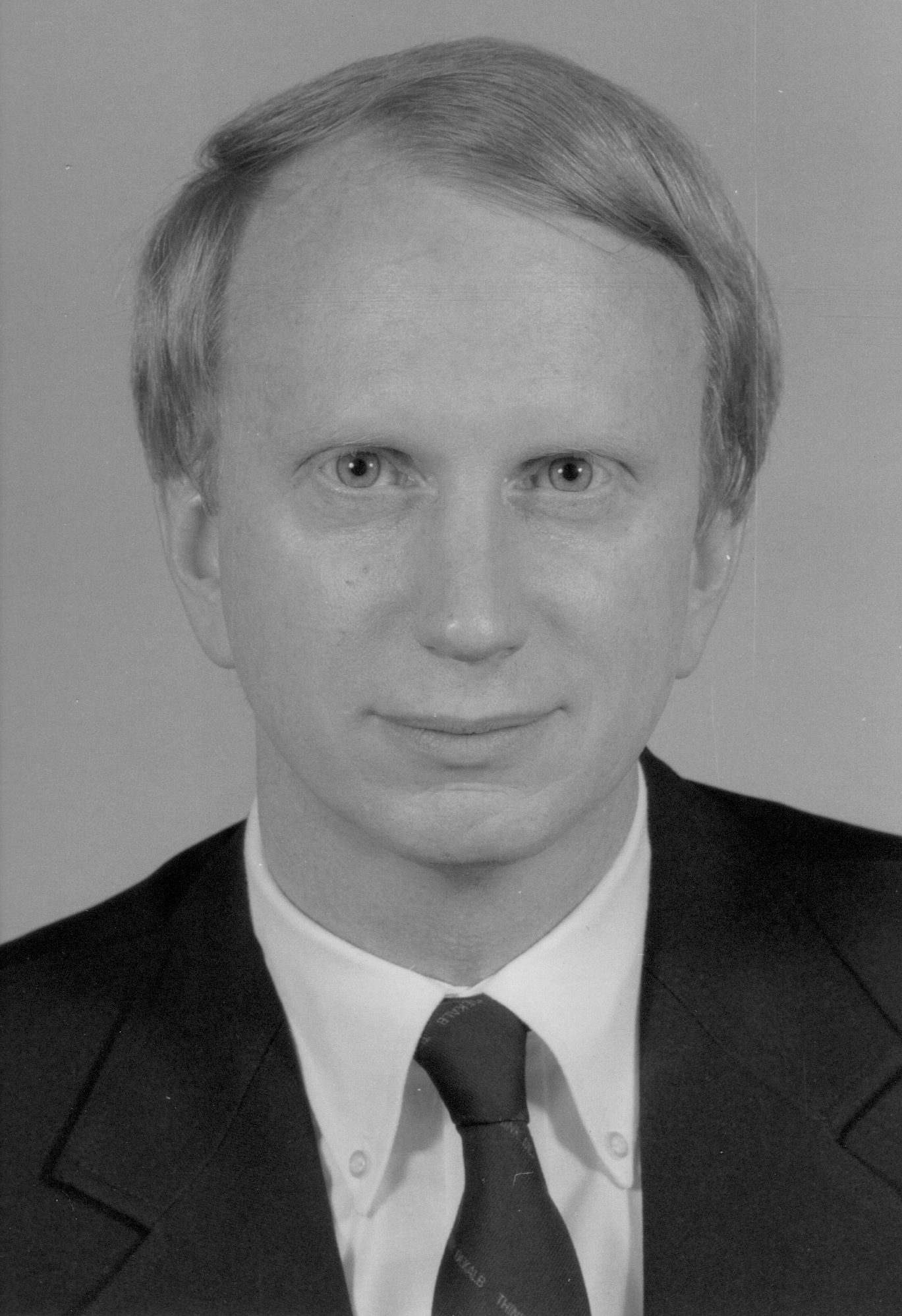
- Morton, c. 1988

Member of the Georgia House of Representatives from the 47th district
- In office 1983–1991
- Preceded by: Joseph A. Burton
- Succeeded by: Tom Sherrill

Personal details
- Born: August 21, 1951 (age 75) Miami, Florida
- Party: Republican
- Children: Tamara Gayle Morton
- Education: Florida State University
- Occupation: Stockbroker
- Profession: Politician

Chesley V. Morton Jr. (born August 21, 1951) is an American stockbroker, securities arbitrator, and former member of the Georgia House of Representatives.

== Biography ==
=== Early years and education ===
Chesley V. Morton Jr. was born in Miami, Florida, on August 21, 1951, to Chesley V. Morton Sr. and Anne Morton (née Morton – unrelated). In 1953, his father moved the family to Fort Lauderdale where he established a law practice. Morton attended Broward County schools. While studying in Prague, Czechoslovakia, in 1968, he and other American students were among the first foreigners evacuated after the military invasion of that country by the Warsaw Pact. He graduated from Nova High School (Davie, Florida) in 1969 and was accepted to Florida State University, majoring in Broadcast Communications. After graduation, he worked for the Florida Public Broadcasting Service program Today in the Legislature covering political events as still photographer and TV cameraman. In 1976 he moved to Atlanta, Georgia, where he attended Woodrow Wilson College of Law, later transferring to Atlanta Law School. While attending night law school, Morton worked as a paralegal, and later served as a Deputy Sheriff in Gwinnett County, Georgia.

Morton married in 1986 and divorced in 1990. The couple had one child. Since 1985 he has worked as a stockbroker and as a securities industry arbitrator for the dispute resolution forums of the New York Stock Exchange and the National Association of Securities Dealers (NASD now FINRA).

=== Georgia House of Representatives ===
Morton was elected to four terms in the Georgia General Assembly beginning in 1983, serving as State Representative from the 47th District for eight years. The district included portions of Chamblee, Doraville, Tucker, and unincorporated DeKalb County. He was a member of the Agriculture and Consumer Affairs, Banks and Banking, and Regulated Beverages committees. During his tenure, he was the ranking Republican on the Agriculture and Consumer Affairs committee. In November 1989, Representative Morton served as an official foreign observer during the independence election in Namibia, held under the auspices of the United Nations Transition Assistance Group (UNTAG), which monitored the election of members of the Constituent Assembly. The work of foreign observers helped to ensure that the elections were certified as free and fair by the UN Special Representative, Martti Ahtisaari.

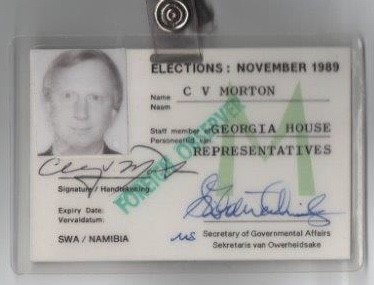
Foreign Observer identification badge issued during the 1989 Namibian election

==== Animal protection and humane euthanasia ====
Representative Morton sponsored the Georgia Animal Protection Act of 1986, one of the earliest comprehensive animal protection measures in the United States. The law was enacted in response to the inhumane treatment of companion animals by a pet store chain in Atlanta. The Act provided for the licensing and regulation of pet shops, stables, kennels, and animal shelters, and established, for the first time, minimum standards of care. The Georgia Department of Agriculture was tasked with enforcing the law through the Department's newly created Animal Protection Division. Representative Morton then sponsored an additional provision, added in 1990, known as the Humane Euthanasia Act, which was the first state law to mandate intravenous injection of sodium pentobarbital in place of gas chambers and other less humane methods. Commissioner Tommy Irvin and the Georgia Department of Agriculture were required, in their licensing of animal shelters, to enforce the new humane euthanasia law. However, Commissioner Irvin failed to abide by the terms of the law, and instead continued to license gas chambers. In March 2007, Morton sued the Georgia Department of Agriculture and Commissioner Irvin. The Fulton County Superior Court ruled in favor of the Plaintiffs, validating the terms of the Humane Euthanasia Act, with an injunction prohibiting the Department from issuing licenses to shelters using gas chambers in violation of the Act. After the Court decision, and issuance of the permanent injunction, Irvin continued to voice resistance to the ruling. In an interview with a south Georgia newspaper, Irvin suggested possible ways to circumvent the law, including the use of private contractors to operate gas chambers. When the Department continued to license a gas chamber in Cobb County, Georgia, a second court action was brought, which resulted in the Department being held in contempt. The cases received widespread coverage in the media, casting Irvin in an unfavorable light.

==== Penny Stock Law ====
The State of Georgia was the first state to codify a comprehensive penny stock securities law. Secretary of State Max Cleland, whose office enforced State securities laws was a principal proponent of the legislation. Representative Morton, the only stockbroker in the Georgia General Assembly at the time, was a principal sponsor of the bill in the House of Representatives. Georgia's penny stock law was subsequently challenged in court. It was eventually upheld in U.S. District Court, and the statute became the template for laws enacted in other states. Shortly after enactment of the Georgia law, the Financial Industry Regulatory Authority (FINRA) and the Securities and Exchange Commission enacted comprehensive revisions of their penny stock regulations. These regulations proved effective in either closing or greatly restricting broker/dealers, such as Blinder, Robinson & Company, which specialized in the penny stocks sector.

==== Consumer protection – Georgia Print Law ====
In 1986, Representative Morton introduced the Georgia Print Law, to protect consumers in the popular "limited edition" art market. In the United States limited editions are regulated under state consumer protections laws. California became the first state to regulate the sale of limited edition art prints with the "California Print Law" of 1971. The state of Illinois later expanded on the California statute. However, it was not until 1986 that more comprehensive provisions, still in place today, were enacted with the passage of the Georgia Print Law. That law became the template for statutes subsequently enacted by other states. The Georgia Print Law, written by Representative Morton, became effective July 1, 1986. The law requires art dealers, artists, or auctioneers to supply information to perspective purchasers about the nature of the print, the number of prints and editions (including HC editions) produced, and the involvement (if any) of the artist in the creation of the print. The penalty for violation of the law ranges from simple reimbursement to treble damages, in the case of a willful violation. Those found to be in violation of the law are also liable for court costs, expenses, and attorney fees. The law applies to works of art valued at more than $100.00 (not including frame). Charitable organizations are specifically exempt from the provision of the law. The statute of limitations is one year after discovery, and, if discovery of the violation is not made within three years of the sale, then the purchaser’s remedies are extinguished.

A limited edition is normally hand signed and numbered by the artist, typically in pencil, in the form (e.g.): 14/100. The first number is the number of the print itself. The second number is the number of overall prints the artist will print of that image. The lower the second number is, the more valuable and collectible the limited editions are likely to be, within whatever their price range is. A small number of "artists' proofs" may also be produced as well, signed and with "AP", "proof", etc. Prints that are given to someone or are for some reason unsuitable for sale are marked "H. C." or "H/C", meaning "hors de commerce", not for sale.

== See also ==
- Animal welfare
- FINRA Arbitration
- History of Namibia
- Microcap stock fraud
- Prague Spring
- Special edition
- Warsaw Pact invasion of Czechoslovakia
