= Steve Madden, Ltd. =

American shoe company

Steven Madden, Ltd.

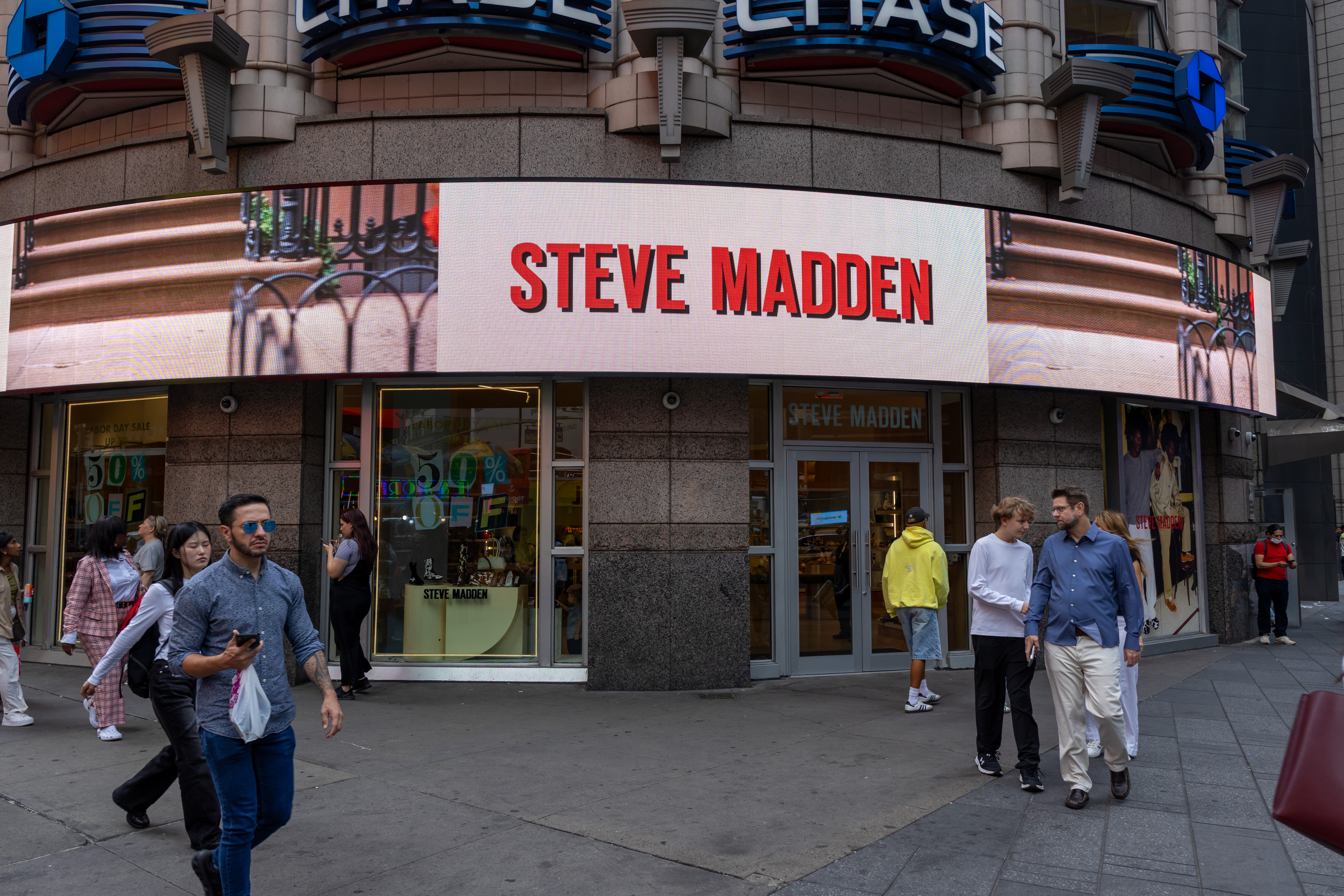
- Steve Madden store in Times Square, New York City
- Type: Public
- Traded as: Nasdaq: SHOO; S&P 600 component
- Industry: Footwear & accessories
- Founded: 1990; 36 years ago
- Founder: Steve Madden
- Headquarters: 52-16 Barnett Ave.; Long Island City, New York City, U.S.
- Number of locations: 255 (2023)
- Key people: Steve Madden (Creative & Design Chief); Edward Rosenfeld (CEO)
- Products: Shoes & accessories
- Revenue: ▲US$2.53 billion (2025)
- Net income: ▼US$49.0 million (2025)
- Number of employees: ≈ 4,200 (2024)
- Website: stevemadden.com

Steven Madden, Ltd. is a publicly traded company that designs and markets shoes and fashion accessories. Based in Long Island City, New York, the company's brands include Dolce Vita, Betsey Johnson, Blondo, BB Dakota and Mad Love. Steve Madden is also a licensee of various brands, including Anne Klein and Superga.

== History ==
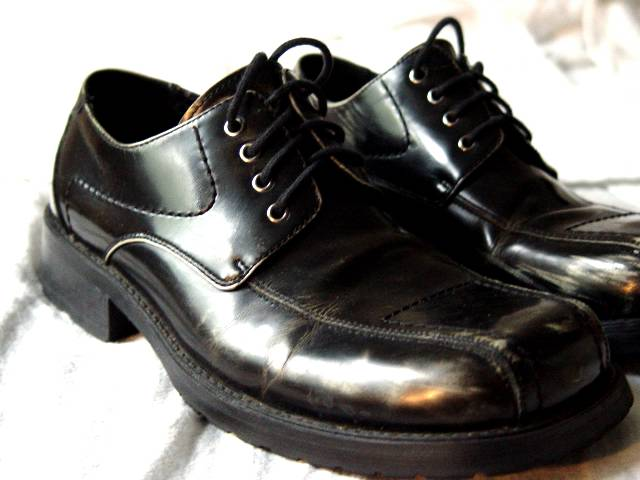
A pair of dress-casual Maddens

Businessman Steve Madden started the company with $1,100 in 1990 by selling shoes out of the trunk of his car to small Manhattan stores, where their chunky platform look attracted clothing designers, such as Betsey Johnson, who used them in their fashion shows. Steven Madden, Ltd. was incorporated in New York on July 9, 1990, and reincorporated under the same name in Delaware in November 1998. The company went public in 1993, underwritten through Stratton Oakmont. In December 2015, Steve Madden's Dutch operations were affected by the bankruptcy of Macintosh Retail Group. The company reported net sales of US$1.98 billion for 2023.

== Awards and honors ==
- Footwear News Company of the Year Award (2001, 2006, 2009, 2011, 2017)
- Footwear News Reader's Choice: Best Performing Wholesaler Award (2011)
- NASDAQ Honors Steve Madden & 20 Year Anniversary (June 2010)
- Nordstrom "Partners in Excellence" Award (May 2010)
- AAFA American Image Awards: Brand of the Year (2010)
- Footwear News Milestone Issue (February 2010)
