= International Journal of Law, Crime and Justice =

- Discipline: Criminal justice, criminal law
- Language: English
- Edited by: John Carrier, Sarah Charman, Stephen P. Savage

Publication details
- Former name(s): International Journal of Criminology and Penology, International Journal of the Sociology of Law
- History: 1973-present
- Publisher: Elsevier
- Frequency: Quarterly
- Impact factor: 0.407 (2016)

Standard abbreviations
- ISO 4: Int. J. Law Crime Justice

Indexing
- ISSN: 1756-0616 (print); 1876-763X (web)
- LCCN: 2008234123
- OCLC no.: 213300023

Links
- Journal homepage; Online archive

The International Journal of Law, Crime and Justice is a quarterly peer-reviewed academic journal covering criminology and various legal disciplines, including criminal law and the sociology of law. It was established in 1973 as the International Journal of Criminology and Penology, and in 1979, it was renamed the International Journal of the Sociology of Law. It obtained its current name in 2008. It is published by Elsevier and the editors-in-chief are John Carrier (London School of Economics), Sarah Charman, and Stephen P. Savage (University of Portsmouth). According to the Journal Citation Reports, the journal has a 2016 impact factor of 0.407.
