= Gregory Coleman (guitarist) =

American musician (1949–2005)

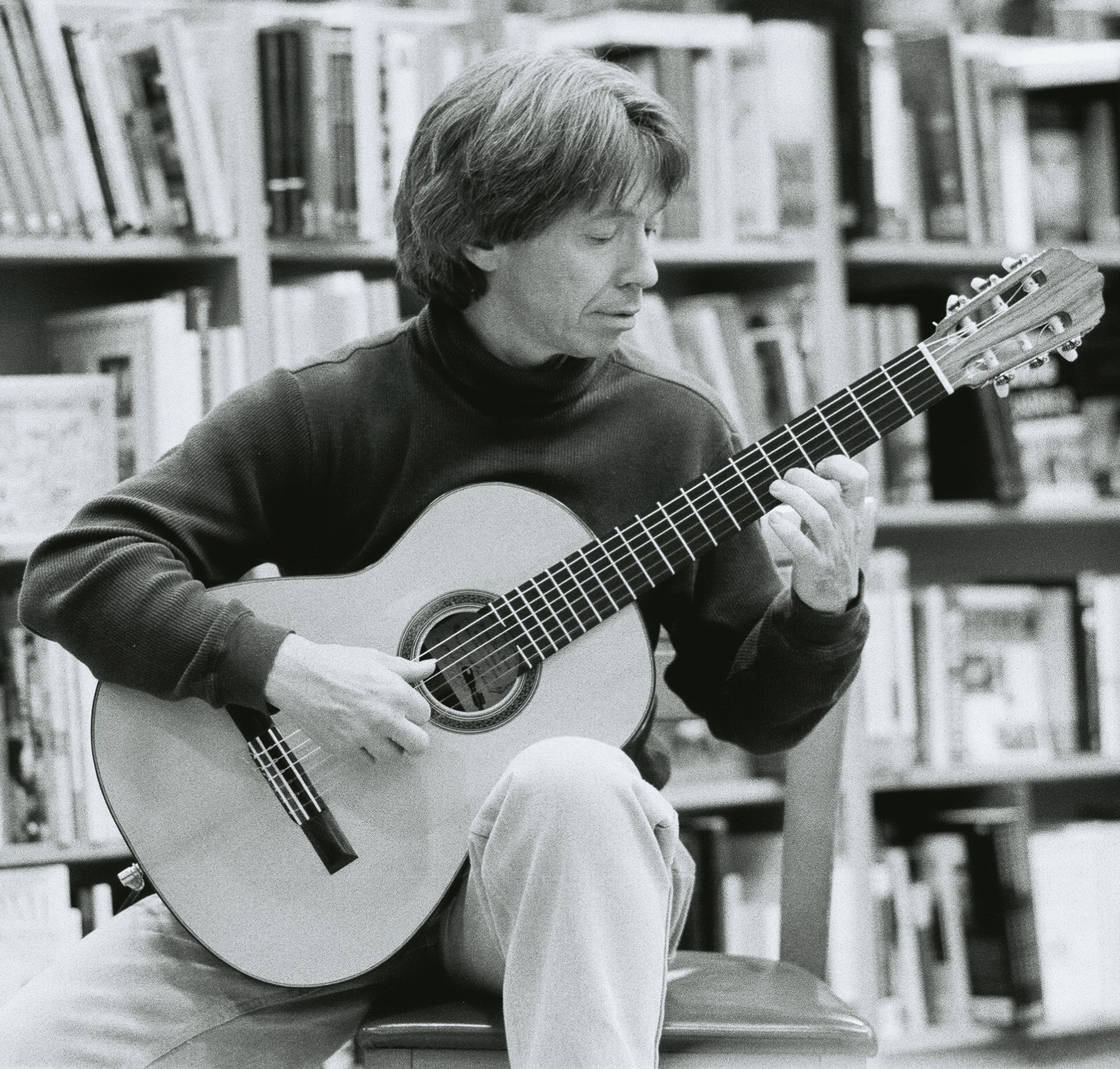
- Gregory Coleman; Mission Viejo, California (2002)

Background information
- Born: Gregory James Coleman; June 29, 1949; Los Angeles, California, United States
- Died: September 16, 2005 (aged 56) Trabuco Canyon, California, United States
- Genres: Classical
- Occupations: Musician, educator
- Instrument: Classical guitar

Gregory James Coleman (29 June 1949 – 16 September 2005) was a classical guitarist, educator, composer, and arranger.

Coleman taught classical guitar for over 42 years at Saddleback College, Orange Coast College, Irvine Valley College, University of Redlands, Cal State San Bernardino, and privately. He studied with renowned guitarists, including Laurindo Almeida, Christopher Parkening, Joe Pass, Howard Roberts, and Pepe Romero. Coleman's father Ervan Coleman was a studio guitarist, a founding member of the Baja Marimba Band, and a session player with The Tijuana Brass.

Coleman attended Saddleback College and the University of California, Irvine. He died from melanoma on 16 September 2005 in Trabuco Canyon.

== Discography ==
Title	Year	Format
Gregory Coleman	1976	LP
Sarabande of the Distance	1999	CD
Isla California	2002	CD
