= Microcap stock fraud =

Form of securities fraud

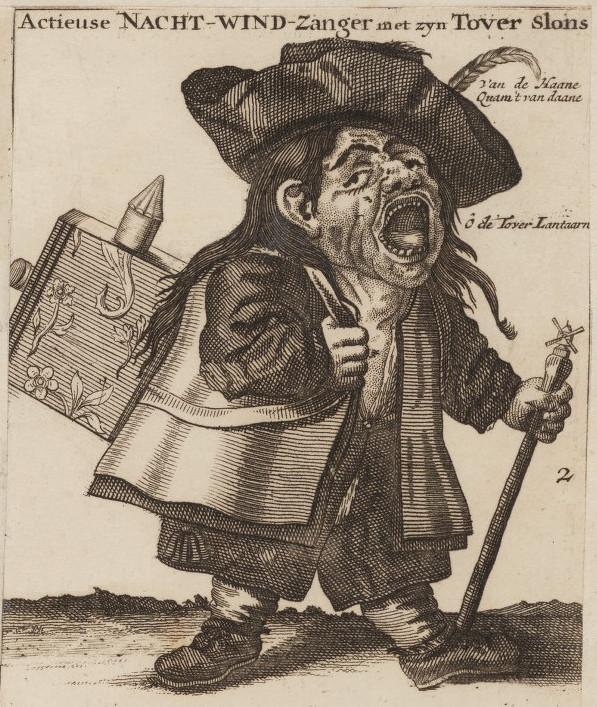
"Night wind hawkers" sold stock on the streets during the South Sea Bubble (The Great Picture of Folly, 1720).

Microcap stock fraud is a form of securities fraud involving stocks of "microcap" companies, generally defined in the United States as those with a market capitalization of under $250 million. Its prevalence has been estimated to run into the billions of dollars a year. Many microcap stocks are penny stocks, which the SEC defines as a security that trades at less than $5 per share, is not listed on a national exchange, and fails to meet other specific criteria.

Microcap stock fraud generally takes place among stocks traded on the OTC Bulletin Board and the Pink Sheets Electronic Quotation Service, stocks which usually do not meet the requirements to be listed on the stock exchanges. Some fraud occurs among stocks traded on the NASDAQ Small Cap Market, now called the NASDAQ Capital Market.

Microcap fraud encompasses several types of investor fraud:

- Pump-and-dump schemes, involve the use of false or misleading statements to hype stocks, which are "dumped" on the public at inflated prices. Such schemes involve telemarketing and Internet fraud.
- Chop stocks, which are stocks purchased for pennies and sold for dollars, provide both brokers and stock promoters with massive profits. Brokers are often paid "under the table" undisclosed payoffs to sell such stocks.
- Dump and dilute schemes, where companies repeatedly issue shares for no reason other than taking investors' money away. Companies using this kind of scheme tend to periodically reverse-split the stock.
- Other unscrupulous brokerage practices include "bait-and-switch", unauthorized trading, and "no net sales" policies in which customers are prohibited or discouraged from selling stocks.

== Pump and dump ==
Many penny stocks, particularly those that trade for fractions of a cent, are thinly traded. They can become the target of stock promoters and manipulators. These manipulators first purchase large quantities of stock, then drive up the share price through false and misleading positive statements; they then sell their shares at a large profit. This is referred to as a "pump and dump" scheme. The pump and dump is a form of microcap stock fraud. In more sophisticated versions of the fraud, individuals or organizations buy millions of shares, then use newsletter websites, chat rooms, stock message boards, press releases, or e-mail blasts to drive up interest in the stock. Very often, the perpetrator will claim to have inside information about impending news to persuade the unwitting investor to quickly buy the shares. When buying pressure pushes the share price up, the rise in price entices more people to believe the hype and to buy shares as well. Eventually, the manipulators doing the "pumping" end up "dumping" when they sell their holdings.

The expanding use of the Internet and personal communication devices has made penny stock scams easier to perpetrate. Though not a scam per se, one notable example is rapper 50 Cent's use of Twitter to cause the price of a penny stock (HNHI) to increase dramatically. 50 Cent had previously bought 30 million shares of the company, and as a result made $8.7 million in profit. Another example of an activity that skirts the borderline between legitimate promotion and hype is the case of LEXG. Described (but perhaps overstated) as "the biggest stock promotion of all time", Lithium Exploration Group's market capitalization soared to over $350 million after an extensive direct mail campaign. The promotion drew upon the legitimate growth in production and use of lithium while touting Lithium Exploration Group's position within that sector. According to the company's December 31, 2010 form 10-Q (filed within months of the direct mail promotion), LEXG was a lithium company without assets. Its revenues and assets at that time were zero. Subsequently, the company did acquire lithium production/exploration properties and addressed concerns raised in the press.

Penny stock companies often have low liquidity. Investors may encounter difficulty selling their positions after the buying pressure has abated, and the manipulators have fled.

== Chop stocks ==
A chop stock is an equity, usually trading on the Nasdaq Stock Market, OTC Bulletin Board or Pink Sheets listing services, that is purchased at pennies per share and sold by unscrupulous stock brokers to unsuspecting retail customers at several dollars per share.

This practice differs from a pump and dump in that the brokerages make money not strictly by hyping the stock, but rather primarily by marketing the security at a huge markup to their own purchasing price. In this practice, the brokerage firm generally acquires the block of stock by purchasing a large block of the securities (usually from a large shareholder who is not affiliated with the underlying company) at a negotiated price that is well below the current market price (generally 40% to 50% below the then-current quoted offer/ask price) or it acquires the stock as payment for a consulting agreement.

The subject stocks usually have little or no liquidity prior to the block purchase. After the block is purchased, the firm's participating brokers will sell the stock to their brokerage customers at the then-current quoted offer/ask price, to the often victimized investors who are generally unaware of this practice. This large difference, or "spread" between the then-current quoted offer/ask price and the deeply discounted price the block of stock was purchased is almost always shared with the stockbroker at the firm who solicited the trade. For this reason, there is a large benefit and an inherent conflict of interest for the firm and the broker to sell these "proprietary products".

Because the firm is technically "at risk" on the block of stock (if the price of the stock drops below the price at which the block was purchased, the firm will be at a loss on the stock) and stock is usually sold at or even slightly below the then-current prevailing market price offer/ask, the practice is still legal in the United States. In fact, it is not required that this profit spread be disclosed to the client, since it is not technically a "commission". When a securities dealer sells such instruments from its own inventory, a client will receive a trade confirmation stating the transaction was done as "Riskless Principal" or "Markup", which in fact, just like commissions, is also revenue to the firm, and such a practice is often subject to abuse. Only the amount of fees charged over and above the offer/ask are commissions, and must be disclosed. But even though it is still legal, it is frowned upon by the Securities Exchange Commission, and they are using other laws and methods of attack to indirectly thwart the practice.

== Organized crime involvement ==
Microcap fraud has been a major source of income for organized crime. Mob figures from each of the Five Families of the New York mafia, as well as the New Jersey mob, have become involved in stock scams. The Russian Mafia is also involved with this type of microcap stock fraud.

Mafia involvement in 1990s stock swindles was first explored by investigative reporter Gary Weiss in a December 1996 Business Week article. Weiss later explored the Mafia's Wall Street scams in a book.

Organized crime elements were believed to have been short-selling chop stocks in the late 1990s.

== Penny stock regulation ==
One method of regulating and restricting pump-and-dump manipulators is to target the category of stocks most often associated with this scheme. To that end, penny stocks have been the target of heightened enforcement efforts. In the United States, regulators have defined a penny stock as a security that must meet a number of specific standards. The criteria include price, market capitalization, and minimum shareholder equity. Securities traded on a national stock exchange, regardless of price, are exempt from regulatory designation as a penny stock, since it is thought that exchange-traded securities are less vulnerable to manipulation. Therefore, CitiGroup (NYSE:C) and other NYSE listed securities which traded below $1.00 during the market downturn of 2008–2009, while properly regarded as "low priced" securities, were not technically "penny stocks". Although penny stock trading in the United States is now primarily controlled through rules and regulations enforced by the U.S. Securities and Exchange Commission and Financial Industry Regulatory Authority (FINRA), the genesis of this control is found in State securities law. The State of Georgia was the first state to codify a comprehensive penny stock securities law. Secretary of State Max Cleland, whose office enforced State securities laws was a principal proponent of the legislation. Representative Chesley V. Morton, the only stockbroker in the Georgia General Assembly at the time, was the principal sponsor of the bill in the House of Representatives. Georgia's penny stock law was subsequently challenged in court. However, the law was eventually upheld in U.S. District Court, and the statute became the template for laws enacted in other states. Shortly thereafter, both FINRA and the SEC enacted comprehensive revisions of their penny stock regulations. These regulations proved effective in either closing or greatly restricting brokers/dealers, such as Blinder, Robinson & Company, which specialized in the penny stocks sector. Meyer Blinder was jailed for securities fraud in 1992, after the collapse of his firm. However, sanctions under these specific regulations lack an effective means to address pump-and-dump schemes perpetrated by unregistered groups and individuals.

== In popular culture ==
Microcap stock fraud has been explored in several books and movies:

- A book that explored microcap fraud was the 2003 book Born to Steal by Gary Weiss. It described the microcap underworld of the 1990s through the eyes of a young broker named Louis Pasciuto. Although the book focuses on the Mafia infiltration of brokerages, it also describes in detail the operation of microcap fraud.
- Microcap fraud was explored in the anonymously written books License to Steal and in The Scorpion and the Frog. Both books explore pump-and-dump schemes in some detail but, unlike Born to Steal, do not provide the real names of the specific firms and people described.
- This kind of fraud has also provided the title for a book by Robert H. Tillman and Michael L. Indergaard called Pump and Dump: The Rancid Rules of the New Economy.
- A fictional account of pump-and-dump schemes can be seen in the movie Boiler Room. According to press accounts, the director and writer of the film worked briefly as a cold-caller for the Stratton Oakmont brokerage house, which was shut down by regulators in the late 1990s. Stratton Oakmont was run by Jordan Belfort, who was jailed for fraud, and whose memoir, The Wolf of Wall Street, is the basis of a 2013 film by Martin Scorsese.
- A pump-and-dump scam was also the subject of several episodes of the popular HBO series, The Sopranos, pulled off by Christopher Moltisanti, Matthew Bevilaqua and Sean Gismonte.
- In an episode of the legal drama Law & Order, entitled "Trade This", the murder of a young stockbroker at a prestigious firm is found to be related to his boss's involvement in several pump-and-dump scams financed by members of a Mafia crime family. Similarly, in the franchise's first computer game, Law & Order: Dead on the Money, the victim is a female stockbroker who was being investigated for a pump-and-dump scam involving a biotech company's suspicious IPO.
- This strategy was fictionalized by Jeffrey Archer in his book Not a Penny More, Not a Penny Less.
