= OTC Bulletin Board =

American electronic quotation system

The OTC (Over-The-Counter) Bulletin Board or OTCBB was a United States quotation medium operated by the Financial Industry Regulatory Authority (FINRA) for its subscribing members. FINRA closed the OTCBB on November 8, 2021.

The board was used for many over-the-counter (OTC) equity securities that were not listed on the NASDAQ or a national stock exchange. It had shrunk significantly as stocks migrated to the trading facilities of the OTC Markets Group. Broker-dealers who subscribed to the system, which was not electronic, were able to use the OTCBB to enter orders for OTC securities that qualified to be quoted. According to the U.S. Securities and Exchange Commission (SEC), "fraudsters often claim or imply that an OTCBB company is a Nasdaq company to mislead investors into thinking that the company is bigger than it is".

FINRA, an independent, not-for-profit organization, ran and provided regulatory services to the OTCBB by "writing and enforcing rules governing the activities of more than 4,100 securities firms with approximately 639,780 brokers". The OTCBB formerly collected 100% of quotes, but that number declined with the rise of its competitor OTC Markets Group, which uses an electronic quotation system. In September 2009, FINRA announced that it would be selling the OTCBB. OTC Markets Group was the leading contender for purchasing the OTCBB, but terms could not be reached. In September 2010, FINRA announced that it had reached terms for the sale of the OTCBB with Rodman & Renshaw, an investment bank. Along with the sale of the OTCBB and, in an effort to provide uniform regulation to all OTC issues and, subsequently, transparency to the OTC market, FINRA has proposed a "quotation consolidation system". Under the quotation consolidation system, FINRA would require dealers to report all of their quotes to the quotation consolidation system, regardless of the market upon which they were originally quoted. This would enable FINRA to have access to all quotes in OTC issues and regulate the OTC market in its entirety. Pink OTC argues this is anti-competitive and an abuse of FINRA's authority.

Companies quoted on the OTCBB had to fully report (i.e., current with all required SEC filings) but there were no market capitalization, minimum share price, corporate governance or other requirements to be quoted. Companies which had been "de-listed" from stock exchanges for falling below minimum capitalization, minimum share price or other requirements often ended up being quoted on the OTCBB. An E after the ticker symbol meant that the company was late in its SEC filings.

Stock of non-reporting companies (those without current SEC filings) may be quoted on one of the markets operated by OTC Markets Group. When the OTCBB was operational, most OTCBB companies were dually quoted, meaning they were quoted on both the OTCBB and the OTC Markets Group markets. Stocks traded on these markets are usually thinly traded microcap or penny stocks. Both retail and institutional investors generally avoid them, because of fears that share prices are easily manipulated and the potential for fraud. The SEC issues warnings to investors to be aware of fraud and manipulation schemes. As such, most companies choose to list on more established exchanges such as the NYSE MKT, New York Stock Exchange, or NASDAQ once eligible. For a time, FINRA believed that the proposed "quotation consolidation system" would enhance transparency, thereby decreasing the potential for price manipulation or fraud.

The suffix ".OB" in a stock-ticker listing signifies "over-the-counter bulletin board" according to its Reuters Instrument Code.

== See also ==
- Microcap stock fraud
