= Penny stock =

Common shares of small public companies that trade for less than five dollars per share

In American economics, penny stocks are common shares of small public companies that trade for less than $5 per share. The U.S. Securities and Exchange Commission (SEC) uses the term "penny stock" to refer to a security, a financial instrument which represents a given financial value, issued by small public companies that trade at less than $5 per share. Prior to the SEC's classification, penny stocks referred to shares that traded for "pennies on the dollar".

== Trade ==
Over-the-counter exchanges that list penny stocks include OTC Link LLC (which is owned by OTC Markets Group, Inc., formerly known as Pink OTC Markets Inc.) and formerly the OTC Bulletin Board (which was a facility of FINRA). Penny stocks can also trade on securities exchanges, including foreign securities exchanges. Penny stocks can include the securities of certain private companies with no active trading market. Nasdaq and the New York Stock Exchange now require that listed stocks maintain a minimum share price of $1.00 per share. Companies that see their stock price fall to below $1.00 per share frequently perform a reverse stock split in order to avoid delisting.

== Risk and investment ==
When considering penny stocks, investors and experts in the field recognize the low market price of shares and its correlation to low market capitalization. Market capitalization or "market cap" is the total dollar market value of all of a company’s outstanding securities.

Since penny stocks are inexpensive, investors often buy large quantities of shares without spending much money. This tendency makes the penny stock market volatile. Volatility is "a statistical measure of the dispersion of returns for a given security or market index". Typically, the higher the volatility, the greater the risk in investing in said securities. Conversely, the lower the volatility, the "safer" the investment is. Volatility can be also understood as the frequency of large changes in the value of a given security in either direction. This is directly correlated to the price action of a security which, when talking about penny stocks, can change more rapidly than that of a large-cap stock.

== Fraud ==
Prosecutors and the Federal Bureau of Investigation say that fraud is widespread in the penny stock market. Potential fraud that involves even what are considered very small or micro market cap companies can still involve losses of tens of millions of dollars.

The penny stock market has little liquidity for some stocks, especially those traded OTC, so holders of shares in penny stock companies often find it difficult to cash out of positions. However, academic research shows that for stocks listed on organized exchanges the risk created by small market cap size and lower liquidity results in higher expected returns due to the size and liquidity premiums.

In the United States, the SEC and the Financial Industry Regulatory Authority (FINRA) have specific rules to define and regulate the sale of penny stocks.

== Concerns for investors ==
There are inherent concerns that individuals should be aware of when investing in penny stocks, namely the lack of information that often exists surrounding the companies offering said stocks. The lack of public reporting mixed with a thin market is often the perfect recipe for stock manipulation via stock promoters. A common practice is for these individuals to purchase large quantities of stock and then utilize promoters to artificially inflate the sub-penny stock’s share price, through false and misleading information. When the liquidity and price increase, the manipulator will sell their stock—known as a "pump and dump" scheme—which is a form of microcap stock fraud.

On April 3, 2017, the Federal Bureau of Investigation (FBI) reported on a story in which penny stock fraud was the focal point of the piece. According to the article, California resident Zirk de Maison was found guilty of conducting a "pump and dump" scheme, during the course of which de Maison and his associates convinced large groups of investors to purchase shares of companies that he had set up as shell organizations.

From 2008 to 2013, de Maison created five small public companies which, unbeknownst to the investing public, did no actual business and had no legitimate assets. Once he set these companies up, he offered public shares of the company’s penny stocks for investors to purchase.

According to the FBI investigation, de Maison would use fictitious names to convince investors to purchase shares of his shell companies, thus driving up the price of his shares and giving the illusion that investors were realizing profit. Once these prices went up, de Maison and his original conspirators would then liquidate their shares at the stock's highest level, and this mass selling caused the shares to drop dramatically, leaving investors with near-worthless shares.

In more sophisticated versions of the fraud, individuals or organizations buy millions of shares, then use newsletter websites, chat rooms, stock message boards, fake press releases, or e-mail blasts to drive up interest in the stock. Very often, the perpetrator will claim to have "inside" information about impending news to persuade the unwitting investor to quickly buy the shares. When buying pressure pushes the share price up, the rise in price entices more people to believe the hype and to buy shares as well. Eventually the manipulators doing the "pumping" end up "dumping," when they sell their holdings.

The expanding use of the Internet and personal communication devices has made penny stock scams easier to perpetrate. Since the Securities & Exchange Commission allowed for the use of social media outlets like Twitter to disclose public information in lieu of press services, many fraudsters have set up accounts to take advantage of this higher level of traffic on social media, giving investors another thing to consider when searching for viable sources of information.

=== Notable cases ===
The Mafia had infiltrated Wall Street by the 1970s. In the 1980s, Lorenzo Formato conducted penny-stock manipulations. Formato testified in Congressional hearings that during the years he promoted and sold penny stocks, he was involved in organized crime, and testified to rampant penny stock manipulation by organized crime. The Congressional hearings led to passage of the Penny Stock Reform Act of 1990.

By 1989, American investors were being cheated out of at least $2 billion a year by schemes involving penny stocks.

Mob activity on Wall Street reportedly increased in the 1990s. On February 10, 1997, The New York Times reported that "Mafia crime families are switching increasingly to white collar crimes" with a focus on "small Wall Street brokerage houses."

In May 1997, an FBI sting operation led to charges against Louis Malpeso Jr., a reported Colombo crime family associate, for conspiring to commit securities fraud with stock broker Joseph DiBella and Robert Cattogio to inflate the price of penny stock "First Colonial Ventures". All three defendants pled guilty.

Another example of an activity that skirts the borderline between legitimate promotion and hype is the case of LEXG. Lithium Exploration Group's market capitalization soared to over $350 million after an extensive direct mail campaign. The promotion drew upon the legitimate growth in production and use of lithium, while touting Lithium Exploration Group's position within that sector. According to the company's December 31, 2010, form 10-Q (filed within months of the direct mail promotion), LEXG was a lithium company without assets. Its revenues and assets at that time were zero. Subsequently, the company did acquire lithium production/exploration properties, and addressed concerns raised in the press.

The "pump and dump" tactic is also known as a supernova and, unlike regular stocks, penny stocks usually move on momentum of the price action.

One of the biggest penny stock operators in the 1950s was Tellier & Co. In the 1980s, major penny stock brokerages included Blinder Robinson (nicknamed "Blind'em and Rob'em"), First Jersey Securities, Rooney Pace, and Stuart-James. Major penny stock brokerages operating in the 1990s included Stratton Oakmont, Sterling Foster, A.S. Goldmen, and Hanover Sterling.

== Regulation ==
In the United States, regulators have defined a penny stock as a security that meets a number of specific standards. The criteria include price, market capitalization, and minimum shareholder equity. Securities traded on a national stock exchange, regardless of price, are exempt from regulatory designation as a penny stock, since it is thought that exchange-traded securities are less vulnerable to manipulation. Therefore, Citigroup (NYSE:C) and other NYSE-listed securities which traded below $1.00 during the market downturn of 2008–09, while properly regarded as "low-priced" securities, were not technically "penny stocks".

Although penny stock trading in the United States is now primarily controlled through rules and regulations enforced by the SEC and FINRA, the genesis of this control is found in State securities law. The State of Georgia was the first state to codify a comprehensive penny stock securities law. Secretary of State Max Cleland, whose office enforced State securities laws, was a principal proponent of the legislation. Representative Chesley V. Morton, the only stockbroker in the Georgia General Assembly at the time, was principal sponsor of the bill in the House of Representatives. Georgia's penny stock law was subsequently challenged in court. However, the law was eventually upheld in U.S. District Court, and the statute became the template for laws enacted in other states. Shortly thereafter, both FINRA and the SEC enacted comprehensive revisions of their penny stock regulations.

These regulations proved effective in closing or greatly restricting broker/dealers, such as Blinder, Robinson & Company, which specialized in the penny stocks sector. Meyer Blinder was jailed for securities fraud in 1992, after the collapse of his firm.

== History of the Term ==
The term "penny stock" originated in the United States in the early 20th century to describe highly speculative shares that literally traded for pennies or a few cents per share. Today, the U.S. Securities and Exchange Commission (SEC) generally defines penny stocks as shares trading below $5, with certain exceptions. During the 1980s and 1990s, concerns about fraud and market manipulation led to stricter regulations, including the Penny Stock Reform Act of 1990. Today, penny stocks are commonly associated with small market capitalization companies, increased price volatility, and greater investment risks.

== See also ==
- Shell corporation
