= Stratton Oakmont =

Defunct American brokerage house (1989–1996)

Coordinates: 40.75747°N 73.69342°W

Stratton Oakmont, Inc.
- Type: Brokerage house
- Industry: Securities
- Founded: 1989; 37 years ago
- Founders: Jordan Belfort; Danny Porush
- Defunct: December 1996; 29 years ago
- Headquarters: 1979 Marcus Avenue, Lake Success, New York, US
- Area served: United States
- Key people: Jordan Belfort (CEO), Andrew Greene, Steven P. Sanders, Victor Wang, Scotty Gelt; Danny Porush (Chairman and President)
- Number of employees: 1,378

Stratton Oakmont, Inc. was an American over-the-counter brokerage house founded in 1989 by Jordan Belfort and Danny Porush. The firm defrauded many shareholders, leading to the arrest and incarceration of several executives and the closing of the firm in 1996.

Section 230 of the Communications Decency Act was created in response to Stratton Oakmont, Inc. v. Prodigy Services Co..

== History ==
Jordan Belfort founded Stratton Oakmont in 1989 with Danny Porush. Earlier, Belfort had opened a franchise of Stratton Securities, a minor league broker-dealer, and then bought out the entire firm. Stratton Oakmont became the largest over-the-counter firm in the United States during the late 1980s and 1990s, responsible for the initial public offering of 35 companies, including Steve Madden, Ltd. The firm had no product control function to verify prices of its positions and monitor trading activity.

Stratton Oakmont participated in pump-and-dump schemes, a form of microcap stock fraud (often under $250-$300 million market cap in today's standards) that involves artificially inflating the price of an owned stock through false and misleading positive statements to sell the cheaply purchased stock at a higher price. Once the operators of the scheme "dump" their overvalued shares, the price falls and investors lose their money. Stratton Oakmont also tried to maintain stock prices by refusing to accept or process orders to sell stock. In 1995, the firm sued Prodigy Services Co. for libel in a New York court, in a case that had wide legal implications.

The firm was under near-constant scrutiny from the National Association of Securities Dealers (NASD) from 1989 onward. Finally, in April 1996, the New York District Business Conduct Committee barred Stratton Oakmont from conducting principal retail transactions for a year. Stratton Oakmont appealed to the NASD National Business Conduct Committee. In December, the NBCC expelled Stratton Oakmont from the NASD, putting the firm out of business. Officials called Stratton Oakmont "one of the worst actors" in the securities industry, with a history of "obvious disregard for all rules of fair practice".

In 1999, Belfort and Porush were indicted for securities fraud and money laundering. They pleaded guilty and admitted that for seven years they operated a scheme in which they manipulated the stock of at least 34 companies.

== In popular culture ==
The 2013 film The Wolf of Wall Street is a drama based on Belfort's memoirs, directed by Martin Scorsese. Leonardo DiCaprio stars as Belfort and Jonah Hill plays Donnie Azoff, a fictional character loosely based on Danny Porush.

== See also ==
- Microcap stock fraud
- Stock manipulation
- Fraud
- Ponzi Scheme
