= List of accolades received by The Wolf of Wall Street (2013 film) =

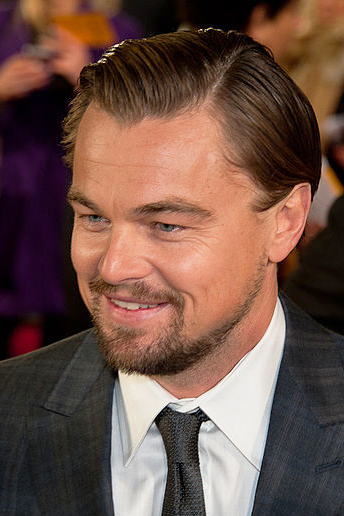
- Leonardo DiCaprio received several accolades for producing and starring in the film, including two Academy Award nominations and a Golden Globe Award.
Accolades
Award	Won	Nominated
AACTA Awards	0	1
Academy Awards	0	5
American Cinema Editors	0	1
American Film Institute	1	1
Art Directors Guild	0	1
Boston Society of Film Critics	5	6
British Academy Film Awards	0	4
Broadcast Film Critics Association	1	6
Casting Society of America	1	1
Chicago Film Critics Association	0	2
Dallas–Fort Worth Film Critics Association	4	4
Detroit Film Critics Society	0	4
Dorian Awards	0	1
Directors Guild of America Award	0	1
Empire Awards	1	2
Florida Film Critics Circle	1	1
Golden Globe Awards	1	2
Grammy Awards	0	1
Irish Film & Television Awards	0	2
London Film Critics Circle Awards	0	4
MTV Movie Awards	2	8
National Board of Review	2	2
Palm Springs International Film Festival	1	1
Producers Guild of America Award	0	1
San Francisco Film Critics Circle	0	5
Satellite Awards	0	5
Visual Effects Society Award	0	1
Washington D.C. Area Film Critics Association	0	4
Writers Guild of America	0	1
- Total number of awards and nominations (Note: Certain award groups do not simply award one winner, they recognize several recipients and have runners-up. Since this is a specific recognition and is different from losing an award, runner-up mentions are considered wins in the awards tally.)
Totals	22	82
- References

The Wolf of Wall Street is a 2013 American biographical black comedy film directed by Martin Scorsese. The screenplay was adapted by Terence Winter from Jordan Belfort's memoir of the same name. The film stars Leonardo DiCaprio as Belfort, a New York stockbroker who runs a firm that engages in securities fraud and money laundering on Wall Street in the 1990s. Jonah Hill, Margot Robbie, and Kyle Chandler feature in supporting roles. The film premiered in New York City on December 17, 2013. Paramount Pictures gave it a wide release in North America and France on December 25. The film grossed a worldwide total of over $392 million on a production budget of $100 million. As of August 2015, it is Scorsese's highest-grossing film. Rotten Tomatoes, a review aggregator, surveyed 276 reviews and judged 79% to be positive.

The Wolf of Wall Street garnered awards and nominations in a variety of categories with particular praise for Scorsese's direction, DiCaprio's performance as Belfort, and Winter's adapted screenplay. At the 86th Academy Awards, the film was nominated for five Academy Awards: Best Picture, Best Director for Scorsese, Best Adapted Screenplay for Winter, Best Actor for DiCaprio, and Best Supporting Actor for Hill but failed to win in any category. The Wolf of Wall Street earned four nominations at the 67th British Academy Film Awards (BAFTAs), including Best Director, Best Actor, and Best Adapted Screenplay but did not win in any category. The film received two nominations at the 71st Golden Globe Awards, including Best Motion Picture – Musical or Comedy with DiCaprio winning the Golden Globe Award for Best Actor – Motion Picture Musical or Comedy. The film was also nominated at the 66th Directors Guild of America Awards, the 25th Producers Guild of America Awards, and the 66th Writers Guild of America Awards. Both the National Board of Review and the American Film Institute included The Wolf of Wall Street in their respective lists of top ten films of 2013.

== Accolades ==
Award	Date of ceremony	Category	Recipient(s)	Result	Ref(s)
AACTA Awards	January 10, 2014	Best Actor – International	Leonardo DiCaprio	Nominated	
Academy Awards	March 2, 2014	Best Picture	Martin Scorsese, Leonardo DiCaprio, Joey McFarland and Emma Tillinger Koskoff	Nominated	
Academy Awards	March 2, 2014	Best Director	Martin Scorsese	Nominated	
Academy Awards	March 2, 2014	Best Actor	Leonardo DiCaprio	Nominated	
Academy Awards	March 2, 2014	Best Supporting Actor	Jonah Hill	Nominated	
Academy Awards	March 2, 2014	Best Adapted Screenplay	Terence Winter	Nominated	
American Cinema Editors	February 7, 2014	Best Edited Feature Film – Comedy/Musical	Thelma Schoonmaker	Won	
American Film Institute	January 10, 2014	Top Ten Films of the Year	Martin Scorsese, Leonardo DiCaprio, Riza Aziz, Joey McFarland, and Emma Tillinger Koskoff	Won	
Art Directors Guild	February 8, 2014	Excellence in Production Design for a Contemporary Film	Bob Shaw	Nominated	
Boston Society of Film Critics	December 8, 2013	Best Film	The Wolf of Wall Street	Runner-up	
Boston Society of Film Critics	December 8, 2013	Best Director	Martin Scorsese	Runner-up	
Boston Society of Film Critics	December 8, 2013	Best Actor	Leonardo DiCaprio	Runner-up	
Boston Society of Film Critics	December 8, 2013	Best Screenplay	Terence Winter	Runner-up	
Boston Society of Film Critics	December 8, 2013	Best Editing	Thelma Schoonmaker	Runner-up	
Boston Society of Film Critics	December 8, 2013	Best Ensemble	The Wolf of Wall Street	Nominated	
British Academy Film Awards	February 16, 2014	Best Director	Martin Scorsese	Nominated	
British Academy Film Awards	February 16, 2014	Best Actor in a Leading Role	Leonardo DiCaprio	Nominated	
British Academy Film Awards	February 16, 2014	Best Adapted Screenplay	Terence Winter	Nominated	
British Academy Film Awards	February 16, 2014	Best Editing	Thelma Schoonmaker	Nominated	
Broadcast Film Critics Association	January 16, 2014	Best Picture	The Wolf of Wall Street	Nominated	
Broadcast Film Critics Association	January 16, 2014	Best Acting Ensemble	The Wolf of Wall Street	Nominated	
Broadcast Film Critics Association	January 16, 2014	Best Director	Martin Scorsese	Nominated	
Broadcast Film Critics Association	January 16, 2014	Best Adapted Screenplay	Terence Winter	Nominated	
Broadcast Film Critics Association	January 16, 2014	Best Editing	Thelma Schoonmaker	Nominated	
Broadcast Film Critics Association	January 16, 2014	Best Actor in a Comedy	Leonardo DiCaprio	Won	
Casting Society of America	January 22, 2015	Big Budget Comedy	Ellen Lewis	Won	
Chicago Film Critics Association	December 16, 2013	Best Adapted Screenplay	Terence Winter	Nominated	
Chicago Film Critics Association	December 16, 2013	Best Editing	Thelma Schoonmaker	Nominated	
Dallas–Fort Worth Film Critics Association	December 16, 2013	Best Picture	The Wolf of Wall Street	7th Place	
Dallas–Fort Worth Film Critics Association	December 16, 2013	Best Director	Martin Scorsese	5th Place	
Dallas–Fort Worth Film Critics Association	December 16, 2013	Best Actor	Leonardo DiCaprio	5th Place	
Dallas–Fort Worth Film Critics Association	December 16, 2013	Best Supporting Actor	Jonah Hill	5th Place	
Detroit Film Critics Society	December 13, 2013	Best Director	Martin Scorsese	Nominated	
Detroit Film Critics Society	December 13, 2013	Best Actor	Leonardo DiCaprio	Nominated	
Detroit Film Critics Society	December 13, 2013	Best Ensemble	The Wolf of Wall Street	Nominated	
Detroit Film Critics Society	December 13, 2013	Best Screenplay	Terence Winter	Nominated	
Directors Guild of America Awards	January 25, 2014	Outstanding Directorial Achievement in Motion Pictures	Martin Scorsese	Nominated	
Dorian Awards	January 21, 2014	Film of the Year	The Wolf of Wall Street	Nominated	
Empire Awards	March 30, 2014	Best Actor	Leonardo DiCaprio	Nominated	
Empire Awards	March 30, 2014	Best Female Newcomer	Margot Robbie	Won	
Florida Film Critics Circle	December 18, 2013	Best Adapted Screenplay	Terence Winter	Runner-up	
Golden Eagle Award	January 23, 2015	Best Foreign Language Film	The Wolf of Wall Street	Nominated	
Golden Globe Awards	January 12, 2014	Best Motion Picture – Musical or Comedy	The Wolf of Wall Street	Nominated	
Golden Globe Awards	January 12, 2014	Best Performance by an Actor in a Motion Picture – Musical or Comedy	Leonardo DiCaprio	Won	
Grammy Awards	February 8, 2015	Best Compilation Soundtrack for Visual Media	The Wolf of Wall Street	Nominated	
Irish Film & Television Awards	April 5, 2014	International Film	The Wolf of Wall Street	Nominated	
Irish Film & Television Awards	April 5, 2014	International Actor	Leonardo DiCaprio	Nominated	
London Film Critics Circle Awards	February 2, 2014	Film of the Year	The Wolf of Wall Street	Nominated	
London Film Critics Circle Awards	February 2, 2014	Actor of the Year	Leonardo DiCaprio	Nominated	
London Film Critics Circle Awards	February 2, 2014	Director of the Year	Martin Scorsese	Nominated	
London Film Critics Circle Awards	February 2, 2014	Screenwriter of the Year	Terence Winter	Nominated	
MTV Movie Awards	April 13, 2014	Movie of the Year	The Wolf of Wall Street	Nominated	
MTV Movie Awards	April 13, 2014	Best Male Performance	Leonardo DiCaprio	Nominated	
MTV Movie Awards	April 13, 2014	Best Breakthrough Performance	Margot Robbie	Nominated	
MTV Movie Awards	April 13, 2014	Best On-Screen Duo	Jonah Hill and Leonardo DiCaprio	Nominated	
MTV Movie Awards	April 13, 2014	Best Shirtless Performance	Leonardo DiCaprio	Nominated	
MTV Movie Awards	April 13, 2014	#WTF Moment	Leonardo DiCaprio	Won	
MTV Movie Awards	April 13, 2014	Best Musical Moment	Leonardo DiCaprio	Nominated	
MTV Movie Awards	April 13, 2014	Best Comedic Performance	Jonah Hill	Won	
National Board of Review	December 4, 2013	Best Adapted Screenplay	Terence Winter	Won	
National Board of Review	December 4, 2013	Top Ten Films	The Wolf of Wall Street	Won	
Palm Springs International Film Festival	January 5, 2014	Creative Impact in Acting Award	Jonah Hill (The Wolf of Wall Street, and Moneyball)	Won	
Producers Guild of America Awards	January 19, 2014	Best Theatrical Motion Picture	Riza Aziz, Emma Koskoff, and Joey McFarland	Nominated	
San Francisco Film Critics Circle	December 15, 2013	Best Film	The Wolf of Wall Street	Nominated	
San Francisco Film Critics Circle	December 15, 2013	Best Director	Martin Scorsese	Nominated	
San Francisco Film Critics Circle	December 15, 2013	Best Actor	Leonardo DiCaprio	Nominated	
San Francisco Film Critics Circle	December 15, 2013	Best Adapted Screenplay	Terence Winter	Nominated	
San Francisco Film Critics Circle	December 15, 2013	Best Editing	Thelma Schoonmaker	Nominated	
Satellite Awards	February 23, 2014	Best Motion Picture	The Wolf of Wall Street	Nominated	
Satellite Awards	February 23, 2014	Best Director	Martin Scorsese	Nominated	
Satellite Awards	February 23, 2014	Best Actor – Motion Picture	Leonardo DiCaprio	Nominated	
Satellite Awards	February 23, 2014	Best Adapted Screenplay	Terence Winter	Nominated	
Satellite Awards	February 23, 2014	Best Editing	Thelma Schoonmaker	Nominated	
Visual Effects Society	February 12, 2014	Outstanding Supporting Visual Effects in a Feature Motion Picture	Robert Legato, Mark Russell, Joseph Farrell, Lisa Spence	Nominated	
Washington D.C. Area Film Critics Association	December 9, 2013	Best Director	Martin Scorsese	Nominated	
Washington D.C. Area Film Critics Association	December 9, 2013	Best Actor	Leonardo DiCaprio	Nominated	
Washington D.C. Area Film Critics Association	December 9, 2013	Best Adapted Screenplay	Terence Winter	Nominated	
Washington D.C. Area Film Critics Association	December 9, 2013	Best Editing	Thelma Schoonmaker	Nominated	
Writers Guild of America	February 1, 2014	Best Adapted Screenplay	Terence Winter	Nominated	
Young Artist Association	May 4, 2014	Best Supporting Young Actress in a Feature Film	Giselle Eisenberg	Nominated	

== See also ==
- 2013 in film
