= Red Granite Pictures =

Defunct American film production and distribution company

- Industry: Film
- Founded: 2010; 16 years ago
- Founder: Riza Aziz; Joey McFarland
- Defunct: 2018; 8 years ago
- Fate: Closed after 1MDB scandal
- Headquarters: West Hollywood, California
- Products: Motion pictures
- Divisions: Red Granite International
- Website: redgranitepictures.com

Red Granite Pictures was an American film production and distribution company, co-founded by Riza Aziz and Joey McFarland in 2010. Its productions included The Wolf of Wall Street and Dumb and Dumber To. It was dissolved in 2018 after being implicated in the 1Malaysia Development Berhad corruption scandal, having been financially backed by the scandal's key figure, Jho Low.

== History ==
Red Granite Pictures made its debut with Friends with Kids, a romantic comedy written and directed by Jennifer Westfeldt. It then co-produced the thriller Out of the Furnace and produced the 2013 film The Wolf of Wall Street, which was nominated for five Academy Awards, including Best Picture (see § Accolades). The Wolf of Wall Street was directed by Martin Scorsese and stars Leonardo DiCaprio, Margot Robbie and Jonah Hill. The film is based on the memoir of the same name by former stockbroker Jordan Belfort. Red Granite Pictures then produced films such as Dumb and Dumber To and the 2017 film Papillon, which was based on the best-selling autobiography by the French convict Henri Charrière.

== Legal disputes ==
The producers of the 1994 film Dumb and Dumber claimed Red Granite Pictures pushed them out of producing the 2014 sequel. On July 16, 2014, plaintiffs withdrew their racketeering claim with prejudice, meaning it could not be refiled, which was characterized as a strong suggestion that the lawsuit underlying it had been settled. On July 18, 2014, a request for dismissal was filed in Los Angeles Superior Court and the case was officially settled. The announcement of the settlement lists the plaintiffs as executive producers, and all claims of racketeering made against Red Granite, Riza Aziz and Joey McFarland were withdrawn. The plaintiffs said in a statement, “We apologize for naming Riza Aziz and Joey McFarland as individual defendants rather than just Red Granite.”

== 1MDB scandal ==
Red Granite Pictures was caught up in the 1Malaysia Development Berhad scandal: the company was financially backed by the scandal's central figure, Jho Low, with funds allegedly stolen from 1MDB. In 2016, the FBI issued subpoenas to several past and present employees of the company in regard to allegations that US$155 million was diverted from 1MDB to help finance the 2013 film The Wolf of Wall Street, where Jho Low had been given "Special Thanks" in the credits. Red Granite Pictures, whose co-founder and chairman Riza Aziz is the stepson of former Malaysian prime minister Najib Razak, denied any wrongdoing. However, in March 2018, Red Granite Pictures agreed to pay $60 million to the US government in order to settle a civil lawsuit alleging that its movies were funded in part by money siphoned from 1MDB. The company ceased operations in 2018. Co-founder Joey McFarland left in late 2018 and later formed McFarland Entertainment.

== Filmography ==
=== Feature films ===
Year	Title	Director	Co-production with	Distributor(s)	Notes
2012	Friends with Kids	Jennifer Westfeldt	Points West Pictures; Locomotive	Lionsgate; Roadside Attractions	First film
2013	Out of the Furnace	Scott Cooper	Scott Free Productions; Appian Way Productions	Relativity Media	
2013	The Wolf of Wall Street	Martin Scorsese	Appian Way Productions; Sikelia Productions; EMJAG Productions	Paramount Pictures (United States, Canada and Japan); Universal Pictures (select European territories)	5 Academy Award nominations; see § Accolades
2014	The Bag Man	David Grovic	Cinedigm; TinRes Entertainment	Cinedigm; Universal Studios Home Entertainment	
2014	Horns	Alexandre Aja	Mandalay Pictures	Dimension Films; RADiUS-TWC	
2014	Dumb and Dumber To	Peter and Bobby Farrelly	New Line Cinema; Conundrum Entertainment	Universal Pictures	
2014	Dying of the Light	Paul Schrader	Grindstone Entertainment Group	Lionsgate	
2015	Daddy's Home	Sean Anders	Gary Sanchez Productions	Paramount Pictures	
2017	Papillon	Michael Noer	Czech Anglo Productions; Ram Bergman Productions; FishCorb Films	Bleecker Street	Final film before closure

== Accolades ==
The Wolf of Wall Street was Red Granite's most honored production. Its Producers Guild of America nomination credited Riza Aziz, Joey McFarland and Emma Tillinger Koskoff as the film's producers.

Award	Category	Nominee(s)	Result	Ref.
Academy Awards	Best Picture	The Wolf of Wall Street	Nominated	
Academy Awards	Best Director	Martin Scorsese	Nominated	
Academy Awards	Best Actor	Leonardo DiCaprio	Nominated	
Academy Awards	Best Supporting Actor	Jonah Hill	Nominated	
Academy Awards	Best Adapted Screenplay	Terence Winter	Nominated	
Golden Globe Awards	Best Motion Picture – Musical or Comedy	The Wolf of Wall Street	Nominated	
Golden Globe Awards	Best Actor – Motion Picture Musical or Comedy	Leonardo DiCaprio	Won	
British Academy Film Awards	Best Direction	Martin Scorsese	Nominated	
British Academy Film Awards	Best Actor in a Leading Role	Leonardo DiCaprio	Nominated	
British Academy Film Awards	Best Adapted Screenplay	Terence Winter	Nominated	
British Academy Film Awards	Best Editing	Thelma Schoonmaker	Nominated	
Producers Guild of America Awards	Best Theatrical Motion Picture	Riza Aziz, Emma Tillinger Koskoff, Joey McFarland	Nominated	
