= Johnny Cannizzaro =

American actor

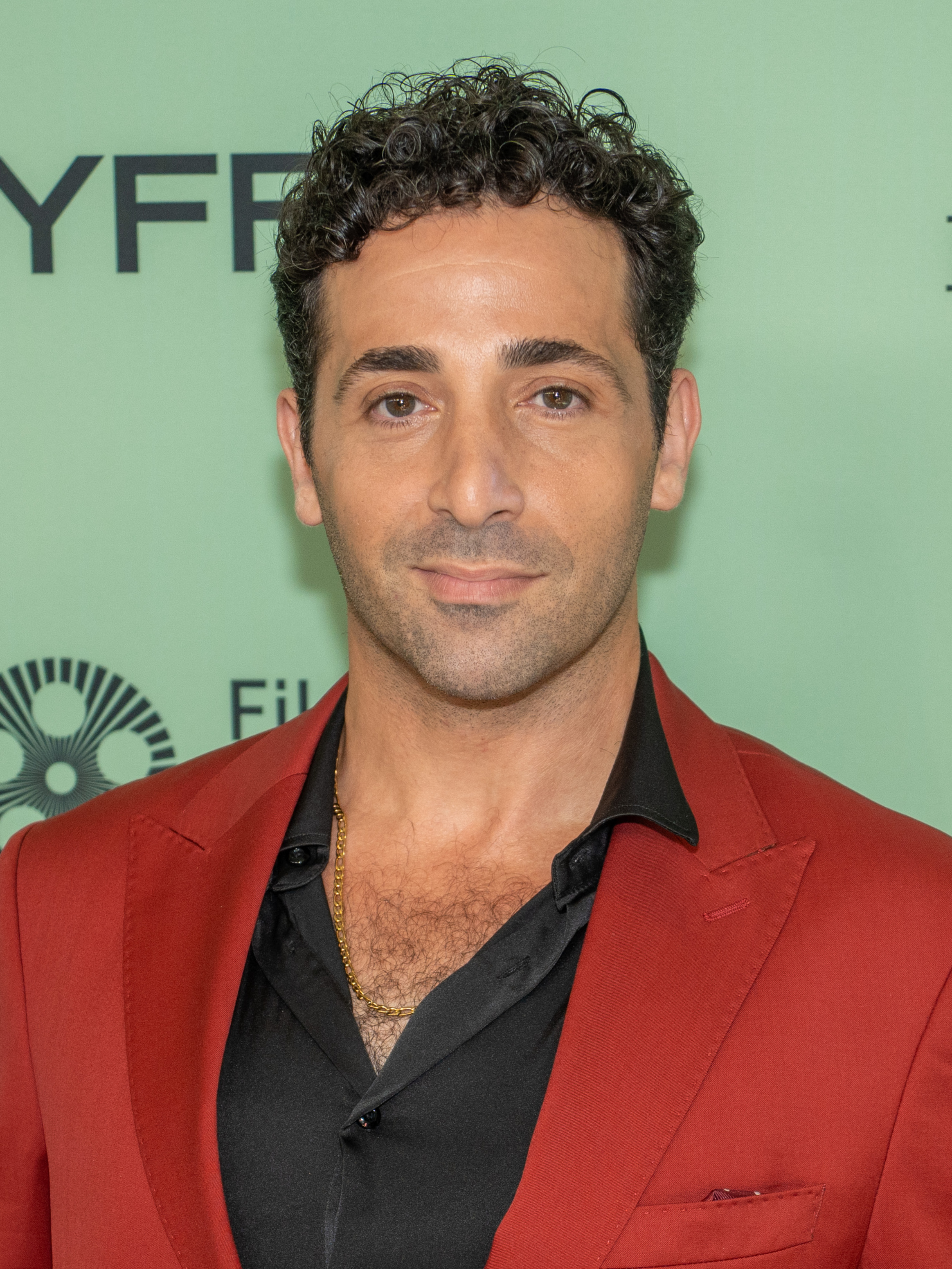
- Cannizzaro at the 2025 New York Film Festival
- Born: New York City, U.S.
- Occupation(s): Actor, screenwriter, musician
- Years active: 2006–present

Johnny Cannizzaro is an American stage, film and television actor, screenwriter, playwright and musician. He had a role in Clint Eastwood's Jersey Boys.

== Early life ==
Cannizzaro was born in the borough of Brooklyn in New York City. He grew up in the Bensonhurst neighborhood until the age of five with his two siblings. A sister and a twin brother. After the family relocated to Monmouth County in central New Jersey, he discovered an interest in the arts and began participating in local theater productions which led him to piano and dance classes.

== Career ==
In 2009, Cannizzaro recorded an original song for Richard M. Sherman, the Academy Award winning songwriter and composer of Mary Poppins and The Jungle Book. In 2010, Cannizzaro was cast in a warehouse production of Stephen Sondheim's Into the Woods in downtown Los Angeles starring General Hospital's Anthony Geary

In 2012, Cannizzaro played Ronnie Fusto in A Ring in Brooklyn, a stage musical by Alan Fleishman and Eric Dodson at the Noho Arts Center in North Hollywood, Ca. In 2013, Cannizzaro made his network TV debut in Frank Darabont's 1940s gangster drama Mob City.

In 2014, Clint Eastwood cast Cannizzaro to play Nick DeVito in the film adaptation of the Tony Award-winning musical Jersey Boys.

In 2016, Cannizzaro guest starred as "Franco" in the series premiere of the USA Network drama Colony. In 2018, Cannizzaro's writing was selected to be performed in the ABC Discovers Talent showcase in both New York and Los Angeles. In 2019, Cannizzaro received a screenwriting fellowship with Taliesin Nexus.

In 2017, Cannizzaro produced and starred in the independent film The Obituary opposite General Hospital alum Anthony Geary.

In 2021, Cannizzaro appeared in a fifth-season episode of S.W.A.T.

In 2022, Cannizzaro guest starred in a season one episode of NCIS: Hawaiʻi, a season four episode of The Rookie, a season 16 episode of Criminal Minds: Evolution, and a season five episode of New Amsterdam.

In 2023, Cannizzaro appeared in a season 1 episode of Quantum Leap.

In 2024, Cannizzaro appeared in a season 1 episode of Matlock. The same year, Cannizzaro was cast as Steven Van Zandt in Scott Cooper’s upcoming Bruce Springsteen biopic Deliver Me from Nowhere.

== Filmography ==
Key
†	Denotes film or TV productions that have not yet been released

=== Film ===
Year	Title	Role	Notes
2014	Jersey Boys	Nick DeVito	
2015	Top of the Rock	Alonzo Reed	Short film
2015	The Obituary	Billy Young	Short film
2015	Murphy's Law	Carmine	Short film
2016	California Dreaming	Clark	Short film
2016	Knavish Folk	Tim	
2017	The Best People	Johnny	
2017	Emily	Jack Dickens	Short film
2021	Evac	Deluca	Short film
2025	Springsteen: Deliver Me from Nowhere	Steven Van Zandt	
2025	Stegosaurus †	Oliver Glass	

=== Television ===
Year	Title	Role	Notes
2013	Mob City	James	1 episode
2016	Colony	Franco	1 episode
2021	The Murders at Starved Rock	Anthony Raccuglia	Miniseries
2021	S.W.A.T.	James	1 episode
2022	NCIS: Hawaiʻi	Ryan Delucci	Guest star
2022	The Rookie	Nate Garducci	1 episode
2022	New Amsterdam	Fireman Mike Delaplane	Guest star
2022	Criminal Minds: Evolution	Ryan Tucker	Guest star
2023	Quantum Leap	Ralph	Guest star
2024	Matlock	Adam Bettencourt	1 episode
