= Masanobu Takayanagi =

Japanese cinematographer

- Born: Japan
- Education: AFI Conservatory
- Occupation: Cinematographer
- Notable work: Silver Linings Playbook, The Grey

Masanobu "Masa" Takayanagi (高柳 雅暢, Takayanagi Masanobu) is a Japanese cinematographer whose works include Silver Linings Playbook (2012), Warrior (2011) and The Grey (2011).

== Life and career ==
Takayanagi was raised in Tomioka, a city in Gunma Prefecture, Japan. He briefly attended Tohoku University in Japan before deciding to pursue a career in cinematography in the American film industry; he was inspired by Masters of Light: Conversations with Contemporary Cinematographers, which he saw in a bookstore. He migrated to the United States around 1996 in order to attend film school at California State University, Long Beach at the university's Film and Electronics Arts Department, although he could not speak English at the time. He later attended the AFI Conservatory in Los Angeles and graduated in 2002. His short film Shui Hen, a graduate project he produced at the AFI Conservatory, won the 2003 Palm Springs International Film Festival's award for Best Student Cinematography. In 2004, he was awarded the American Society of Cinematographers' John F. Seitz Student Heritage Award.

After working on the film crews of various low-budget projects, in 2005 Takayanagi was hired as a Tokyo-based second unit cinematographer for the film Babel under Rodrigo Prieto. He later photographed the second units of State of Play, Eat Pray Love, The Eagle, and Monte Carlo. His first turn as a main unit cinematographer was on Meet Monica Velour, followed by The Grey, both released in 2011. In 2012, he was named one of Variety magazine's "10 Cinematographers to Watch". He photographed David O. Russell's 2012 film Silver Linings Playbook, followed by Out of the Furnace in 2013 and Rupert Goold's 2015 film True Story.

In 2015, Takayanagi became a member of the American Society of Cinematographers.

== Filmography ==
=== Film ===
Key
†	Denotes films that have not yet been released

Year	Title	Director	Notes
2006	Ugly Me	Claudio Dabed	
2007	War Eagle, Arkansas	Robert Milazzo	
2009	Amar a morir	Fernando Lebrija	
2010	Meet Monica Velour	Keith Bearden	
2010	Promises Written in Water	Vincent Gallo	
2011	Warrior	Gavin O'Connor	
2011	The Grey	Joe Carnahan	
2012	The Punisher: Dirty Laundry	Phil Joanou	Fan film
2012	Silver Linings Playbook	David O. Russell	
2013	Out of the Furnace	Scott Cooper	
2015	True Story	Rupert Goold	
2015	Spotlight	Tom McCarthy	
2015	Black Mass	Scott Cooper	
2017	Hostiles	Scott Cooper	
2020	Timmy Failure: Mistakes Were Made	Tom McCarthy	
2021	Stillwater	Tom McCarthy	
2021	Swan Song	Benjamin Cleary	
2022	The Pale Blue Eye	Scott Cooper	
2025	Springsteen: Deliver Me from Nowhere	Scott Cooper	
2026	Company	Casey Affleck	
TBA	Time Out †	Scott Cooper	Filming
