= 25th Producers Guild of America Awards =

25th Annual Producers Guild Awards
- Date: January 19, 2014
- Location: The Beverly Hilton, Beverly Hills, California
- Country: United States
- Presented by: Producers Guild of America

Highlights
- Best Producer(s) Motion Picture: 12 Years a Slave – Brad Pitt, Dede Gardner, Jeremy Kleiner, Steve McQueen, and Anthony Katagas; Gravity – Alfonso Cuarón and David Heyman
- Best Producer(s) Animated Feature: Frozen – Peter Del Vecho
- Best Producer(s) Documentary Motion Picture: We Steal Secrets: The Story of WikiLeaks – Alexis Bloom, Alex Gibney, and Marc Shmuger

The 25th Producers Guild of America Awards (also known as 2014 Producers Guild Awards), honoring the best film and television producers of 2013, were held at The Beverly Hilton Hotel in Beverly Hills, California on January 19, 2014. The nominees for documentary motion picture were announced on November 26, 2013. The nominees for television and digital series were announced on December 3, 2013. The nominees for motion picture, animated feature, and long-form television were announced on January 2, 2014.

== Winners and nominees ==
=== Film ===
Darryl F. Zanuck Award for Outstanding Producer of Theatrical Motion Pictures
- 12 Years a Slave – Brad Pitt, Dede Gardner, Jeremy Kleiner, Steve McQueen, and Anthony Katagas (TIE)
- Gravity – Alfonso Cuarón and David Heyman (TIE)
  - American Hustle – Charles Roven, Richard Suckle, Megan Ellison, and Jonathan Gordon
  - Blue Jasmine – Letty Aronson and Stephen Tenenbaum
  - Captain Phillips – Scott Rudin, Dana Brunetti, and Michael De Luca
  - Dallas Buyers Club – Robbie Brenner and Rachel Winter
  - Her – Megan Ellison, Spike Jonze, and Vincent Landay
  - Nebraska – Albert Berger and Ron Yerxa
  - Saving Mr. Banks – Alison Owen, Ian Collie, and Philip Steuer
  - The Wolf of Wall Street – Riza Aziz, Emma Tillinger Koskoff, and Joey McFarland
Outstanding Producer of Animated Theatrical Motion Pictures
- Frozen – Peter Del Vecho
  - The Croods – Kristine Belson and Jane Hartwell
  - Despicable Me 2 – Chris Meledandri and Janet Healy
  - Epic – Lori Forte and Jerry Davis
  - Monsters University – Kori Rae
Outstanding Producer of Documentary Theatrical Motion Pictures
- We Steal Secrets: The Story of WikiLeaks – Alexis Bloom, Alex Gibney, and Marc Shmuger
  - Far Out Isn't Far Enough: The Tomi Ungerer Story – Brad Bernstein and Rick Cikowski
  - Life According to Sam – Andrea Nix Fine, Sean Fine, and Miriam Weintraub
  - A Place at the Table – Julie Goldman, Ryan Harrington, Kristi Jacobson, and Lori Silverbush
  - Which Way Is the Front Line from Here? The Life and Time of Tim Hetherington – James Brabazon and Nick Quested

=== Television ===
Norman Felton Award for Outstanding Producer of Episodic Television, Drama
- Breaking Bad
  - Downton Abbey
  - Game of Thrones
  - Homeland
  - House of Cards
Danny Thomas Award for Outstanding Producer of Episodic Television, Comedy
- Modern Family
  - 30 Rock
  - Arrested Development
  - The Big Bang Theory
  - Veep
David L. Wolper Award for Outstanding Producer of Long-Form Television
- Behind the Candelabra
  - American Horror Story: Asylum
  - Killing Kennedy
  - Phil Spector
  - Top of the Lake
Outstanding Producer of Non-Fiction Television
- Anthony Bourdain: Parts Unknown
  - 30 for 30
  - Duck Dynasty
  - Inside the Actors Studio
  - Shark Tank
Outstanding Producer of Competition Television
- The Voice
  - The Amazing Race
  - Dancing with the Stars
  - Project Runway
  - Top Chef
Outstanding Producer of Live Entertainment & Talk Television
- The Colbert Report
  - Jimmy Kimmel Live!
  - Late Night with Jimmy Fallon
  - Real Time with Bill Maher
  - Saturday Night Live
Outstanding Sports Program
- SportsCenter
  - 24/7
  - Hard Knocks
  - Monday Night Football
  - Real Sports with Bryant Gumbel
Outstanding Children's Program
- Sesame Street
  - Dora the Explorer
  - iCarly
  - Phineas and Ferb
  - SpongeBob SquarePants

=== Digital ===
Outstanding Digital Series
- Wired: What's Inside
  - Burning Love
  - Epic Rap Battles of History
  - The Lizzie Bennet Diaries
  - Video Game High School

=== David O. Selznick Achievement Award in Theatrical Motion Pictures ===
- Barbara Broccoli and Michael G. Wilson

=== Milestone Award ===
- Bob Iger

=== Norman Lear Achievement Award in Television ===
- Chuck Lorre

=== Stanley Kramer Award ===
- Fruitvale Station

=== Vanguard Award ===
- Peter Jackson and Joe Letteri

=== Visionary Award ===
- Chris Meledandri
