= Emma Tillinger Koskoff =

American film producer

- Born: Emma Tillinger
- Occupation: Film producer
- Years active: 1993–present
- Parent(s): John Tillinger; Dorothy Lyman

Emma Tillinger Koskoff is an American film producer. She is best known for her collaborations with Martin Scorsese, including acting as a producer on his films The Wolf of Wall Street (2013), Silence (2016) and The Irishman (2019).

She is the recipient of two Primetime Emmy Awards and a Hollywood Film Award, as well as nominations for two BAFTA Film Awards and three Academy Awards, among other accolades.

== Early life ==
Tillinger is the daughter of actors John Tillinger and Dorothy Lyman. Her paternal grandfather was a German Jew.

== Career ==
Tillinger started her career at Artist Management Group, where she worked for co-founder Rick Yorn. She worked as an assistant for actress Uma Thurman and director Phil Joanou. Afterwards she was assistant to the late Ted Demme, working on Demme's pictures Blow and A Decade Under the Influence.

In January 2003, she joined Martin Scorsese's production company Sikelia Productions. Originally, Tillinger was Scorsese's assistant before she was promoted to Production President in 2006.

Tillinger Koskoff and her fellow producers Scorsese, Leonardo DiCaprio and Joey McFarland were nominated for an Academy Award for Best Picture for the 2013 film The Wolf of Wall Street. She was featured in The Hollywood Reporter in April 2019, with the article covering much of her work with Scorsese and filming in New York City.

== Filmography ==
=== Film ===
Executive producer

- Hugo (2011)
- Free Fire (2016)
- A Ciambra (2017)
- The Elephant and the Butterfly (2017)
- The Snowman (2017)
- Tomorrow (2018)
- The Souvenir (2019)
- Port Authority (2019)
- Vault (2019)
- Uncut Gems (2019)
- The Souvenir Part II (2021)
- Murina (2021)
- Killers of the Flower Moon (2023)

Producer

- The Departed (2006) (Associate producer)
- The Key to Reserva (2007)
- Shutter Island (2010) (Co-producer)
- A Letter to Elia (2010)
- The Wolf of Wall Street (2013)
- Bad Hurt (2015)
- The Audition (2015)
- Bleed for This (2016)
- Silence (2016)
- Joker (2019)
- The Irishman (2019)
- The Good Mother (2023)
- Daddio (2023)
- Day of the Fight (2023)
- Joker: Folie à Deux (2024)
- The Bride! (2026)

Miscellaneous crew

Year	Film	Role
1996	Heaven's Prisoners	Assistant: Phil Joanou
1996	The Truth About Cats & Dogs	Assistant: Uma Thurman
1997	Batman & Robin	Assistant: Uma Thurman
1997	Gattaca	Assistant: Uma Thurman
1998	Les Misérables	Assistant: Uma Thurman
1998	The Avengers	Assistant: Uma Thurman
2001	Blow	Assistant: Ted Demme
2004	The Aviator	Assistant: Martin Scorsese

As an actress

Year	Film	Role
2006	The Departed	Woman with Dog

Thanks

Year	Film	Role
2008	Lymelife	Special thanks
2017	Good Time	Gratitude
2021	Midnight in the Switchgrass	The director would like to thank

=== Television ===
Associate producer

- Boardwalk Empire (2010)

Producer

- Pee-Wee as Himself (2025)

Executive producer

Year	Title	Notes
2007	Val Lewton: The Man in the Shadows	Documentary
2009	POV	Documentary
2013	Glickman	Documentary
2016	Vinyl	
2021	Pretend It's a City	Documentary
TBA	An Afternoon with SCTV	

Miscellaneous crew

Year	Title	Role	Notes
1993−94	The Nanny	Production staff	
2003	The Blues	Assistant: Martin Scorsese	Documentary
2004	Lady by the Sea: The Statue of Liberty	Assistant: Martin Scorsese	Documentary
2005	American Masters	Assistant: Martin Scorsese	Documentary

Thanks

Year	Title	Role	Notes
2004	Dinner for Five	Very special thanks	
2017	American Masters	Very special thanks	Documentary
2017	Five Came Back	The producers wish to thank	Documentary

== Awards and nominations ==
- 2012: Emmy – Outstanding Nonfiction Special for George Harrison: Living in the Material World (with Margaret Bodde, Blair Foster, Olivia Harrison, Nigel Sinclair, Martin Scorsese)
- 2014: AFI Award – Movie of the Year for The Wolf of Wall Street (with Martin Scorsese, Leonardo DiCaprio, Riza Aziz, Joey McFarland)
- 2014: 86th Academy Awards nomination – Best Picture for The Wolf of Wall Street (with Martin Scorsese, Leonardo DiCaprio, Joey McFarland)
- 2020: 92nd Academy Awards nomination – Best Picture for The Irishman (with Martin Scorsese, Robert De Niro, Jane Rosenthal)
- 2020: 92nd Academy Awards nomination – Best Picture for Joker (with Todd Phillips, Bradley Cooper)
- 2020: Producers Guild Film Awards nomination – Darryl F. Zanuck Award for Outstanding Producer of Theatrical Motion Pictures for Joker (with Phillips and Cooper)
- 2020: Producers Guild Film Awards nomination – Darryl F. Zanuck Award for Outstanding Producer of Theatrical Motion Pictures for The Irishman (with Rosenthal, De Niro, and Scorsese
- 2025: 2nd Gotham TV Awards – Outstanding Original Film, Broadcast, or Streaming for Pee-wee as Himself (with Matt Wolf)
- 2025: 77th Primetime Creative Arts Emmy Awards – Outstanding Documentary or Nonfiction Special for Pee-wee as Himself (with Matt Wolf, Ronald Bronstein, Benny Safdie, Josh Safdie, Paul Reubens, and Candace Tomarken)
- 2026: 41st Independent Spirit Awards – Best New Non-Scripted or Documentary Series for Pee-wee as Himself (with Matt Wolf, Ronald Bronstein, Eli Bush, Benny Safdie, Josh Safdie, Paul Reubens, Candace Tomarken, Kyle Martin, Nancy Abraham, Lisa Heller, and Sara Rodriguez)
