= Out of the Furnace =

2013 American crime drama film by Scott Cooper

- Theatrical release poster
- Directed by: Scott Cooper
- Written by: Brad Ingelsby; Scott Cooper
- Produced by: Jennifer Davisson Killoran; Leonardo DiCaprio; Ryan Kavanaugh; Ridley Scott; Michael Costigan
- Starring: Christian Bale; Woody Harrelson; Casey Affleck; Forest Whitaker; Willem Dafoe; Zoë Saldana; Sam Shepard
- Cinematography: Masanobu Takayanagi
- Edited by: David Rosenbloom
- Music by: Dickon Hinchliffe
- Production companies: Appian Way Productions; Scott Free Productions; Red Granite Pictures
- Distributed by: Relativity Media
- Release date: December 6, 2013 (United States)
- Running time: 116 minutes
- Country: United States
- Language: English
- Budget: $22 million
- Box office: $15.7 million

Out of the Furnace is a 2013 American rural noir crime drama film directed by Scott Cooper, from a screenplay he cowrote with Brad Ingelsby. Starring Christian Bale, Woody Harrelson, Casey Affleck, Forest Whitaker, Willem Dafoe, Zoë Saldana, and Sam Shepard, the film follows Russell Baze (Bale), an ex-con steel mill worker in the Appalachian/Rust Belt region of Pennsylvania searching for his missing brother Rodney (Affleck), an Iraq War veteran who disappeared after engaging in a bare knuckle fighting match arranged by John Petty (Dafoe), an indebted bar owner, and Harlan DeGroat (Harrelson), a ruthless drug dealer from rural New Jersey.

Out of the Furnace was theatrically released in the United States on December 6, 2013, and was a box office failure, grossing $15.7 million against its $22 million production budget. Despite mixed reviews from critics, the performances of the cast were widely praised. Affleck was nominated for the Satellite Award for Best Supporting Actor – Motion Picture at the 18th Satellite Awards, while the film was nominated for the Saturn Award for Best Independent Film at the 40th Saturn Awards.

== Plot ==
In 2008, Steel mill worker Russell Baze lives with his brother, Rodney, a United States Army veteran who served four tours in the Iraq War, in North Braddock, Pennsylvania. Russell finds Rodney at a horse racing simulcast. Rodney reveals that the money he bet with - and lost - was lent by John Petty, who owns a bar and runs several illegal games. Russell visits Petty, pays part of Rodney's debt, and promises to pay the rest. Driving home intoxicated, Russell hits a car, killing its occupants, and is incarcerated for vehicular manslaughter. While he is in prison, his girlfriend Lena leaves him for North Braddock police chief Wesley Barnes.

After serving his five-year sentence, Russell returns home and resumes his job at the steel mill despite its impending closure due to cheaper production costs in China. The same day, Rodney participates in an illegal prize fight. He was supposed to take a "dive" to repay some of the debt but becomes enraged when beaten up and defeats his opponent instead. The next morning, Russell finds Rodney's bloodied knuckle tapes and confronts him. Russell urges Rodney to work in the mill with him, but Rodney is too mentally scarred for a regular job.

Tired of small money fights to chip at his debt, Rodney convinces Petty to organize a more lucrative fight. Reluctantly, Petty arranges one with Harlan DeGroat, a sociopathic meth dealer from rural New Jersey to whom Petty owes money. Meanwhile, Russell wants his girlfriend back, but she is pregnant with Wesley's baby. They part knowing that her pregnancy makes it impossible to get back together.

Petty and Rodney meet DeGroat in his stronghold in the Ramapo Mountains. Rodney is instructed to intentionally lose. During the fight, he nearly knocks out his opponent but then takes a dive. After the fight, DeGroat asks for the rest of his loan, but Petty reminds him they had agreed that this fight made them even. However, DeGroat and his men ambush Petty and Rodney on the drive home. Claiming he does not consider his debt paid, DeGroat kills Petty and has Rodney dragged into the woods and killed as well. Unbeknownst to anyone, Petty's cell phone had fallen onto the car seat, accidentally connecting to his bartender Dan's voicemail and recording DeGroat murdering Petty.

That night, Russell finds a letter from Rodney, stating that this will be his last fight and he wants to work with Russell at the mill. Wesley informs Russell about Rodney's disappearance, and Russell and his uncle, Red, set off to find him. In DeGroat's town, Russell and Red are stopped by a Bergen County deputy sheriff, who informs them that DeGroat's men would kill them if they knew why the two were in town, and, as a favor to Wesley, he will escort them to the state line rather than arresting them for illegally carrying concealed weapons.

Upon returning to the mill, Wesley visits Russell and confirms Rodney's death. Russell goes to Petty's office, finds a phone number for DeGroat, and calls him without identifying himself, enticing him to come to collect Petty's debt.

At the bar, Russell sabotages DeGroat's van to prevent his escape and shoots DeGroat twice. Russell informs DeGroat that he is Rodney's brother as Wesley approaches the field in a squad car. Wesley pleads for Russell to put down his gun, but Russell shoots DeGroat in the back of the head. The film cuts to a pensive Russell sitting at home at the dining table, suggesting that Wesley had arranged matters so that he avoided prison.

== Cast ==
- Christian Bale as Russell Baze
- Woody Harrelson as Harlan DeGroat
- Casey Affleck as Rodney Baze Jr.
- Forest Whitaker as Chief Wesley Barnes
- Willem Dafoe as John Petty
- Tom Bower as Dan Dugan
- Zoë Saldana as Lena Taylor
- Sam Shepard as Gerald "Red" Baze
- Bingo O'Malley as Rodney Baze Sr.
- Boyd Holbrook as Tattooed Drug Dealer

== Production ==
=== Development ===
The film was produced by Relativity Media, Appian Way Productions, Red Granite Pictures, and Scott Free Productions, with Jeff Waxman, Tucker Tooley, Brooklyn Weaver, Riza Aziz, Joey McFarland, Joe Gatta, Danny Dimbort, and Christian Mercuri serving as executive producers. Director Scott Cooper read an article about Braddock, Pennsylvania, a declining steel industry town outside Pittsburgh, and the efforts to revitalize it, led by mayor John Fetterman. After visiting, Cooper was inspired to use the borough as the backdrop for a film. Cooper developed the story from The Low Dweller, a spec script written by Brad Ingelsby that had actor Leonardo DiCaprio and director Ridley Scott attached. Rupert Sanders had been attached to direct in 2009, but left due to scheduling conflicts. The studio offered the script to Cooper, which he rewrote, drawing on his experience of growing up in Appalachia and losing a sibling at a young age. DiCaprio and Scott stayed on as producers of the film. The story has no relation to Out of This Furnace, a 1941 historical novel by Thomas Bell, set in Braddock. The Hollywood Reporter reported the film's budget was $22 million.

=== Filming ===
Principal photography began in the Pittsburgh metropolitan area on April 13, 2012, and wrapped on June 1, 2012. The majority of filming took place in Braddock, and additional filming was in nearby North Braddock, Imperial, Rankin, and Swissvale. Cinematographer Masanobu Takayanagi shot the feature in anamorphic format on Kodak 35mm film. Prison scenes were filmed in the Northern Panhandle of West Virginia, at the former State Penitentiary in Moundsville. Filming also took place in rural Beaver County, including a deer hunting scene in Raccoon Creek State Park and a mill scene in Koppel. Independence Township doubled for Bergen County, New Jersey. The Carrie Furnace, an abandoned blast furnace near Braddock, served as the location for the film's finale. Christian Bale wore a tattoo of Braddock's ZIP code, 15104, on his neck as an homage to the town's then-mayor (now US Senator) John Fetterman, who has the same design on his arm.

=== Music ===
The musical score to Out of the Furnace was composed by Dickon Hinchliffe. Originally, it was announced that Alberto Iglesias had reached an agreement to compose the score for the film. However, Hinchliffe later took over scoring duties. Pearl Jam frontman Eddie Vedder re-recorded the song "Release" from Pearl Jam's debut album Ten for the film, which can be heard during the opening scenes and end credits. A soundtrack album featuring Hinchliffe's score was released digitally on December 3, 2013, by Relativity Music Group.

== Release ==
The film premiered at the TCL Chinese Theatre on November 9, 2013, in Hollywood, California as part of the American Film Institute's AFI Fest. It received a limited release in Los Angeles and New York City on December 4, 2013, followed by a wide theatrical release in the U.S. on December 6. Director Scott Cooper won the award for best first or second film for Out of the Furnace at the 2013 Rome Film Festival.

== Reception ==
=== Box office ===
Out of the Furnace was the only new film to receive a wide release in the U.S. on December 6, 2013, and earned an estimated $1.8 million on its opening day. The film took in an estimated $5.3 million over its opening weekend. The film came in third behind the animated Disney film Frozen, which brought in $31.6 million, and The Hunger Games: Catching Fire, which had $27 million in ticket sales that weekend. Relativity Media had pre-sold the film to foreign distributors for $16 million, which offset its costs.

=== Critical response ===
On Rotten Tomatoes, the film has an average approval rating of 53% based on 197 reviews, and an average rating of 5.91/10. The general consensus for the site says: "While it may not make the most of its incredible cast, Out of the Furnace is still so packed with talent that it's hard to turn away." Metacritic gave the film a weighted average score of 63 out of 100 based on 40 critics, indicating "generally favorable reviews". Audiences polled by CinemaScore gave the film an average grade of "C+" on an A+ to F scale.

=== Top ten lists ===
Despite its mixed critical reception, Out of the Furnace appeared on several critics' top ten lists of the best films of 2013.

- 2nd – Richard Roeper, Chicago Sun-Times
- 2nd – Clint O'Connor, Cleveland Plain Dealer
- 4th – Marc Doye, Metacritic
- 6th – Chris Nashawaty, Entertainment Weekly
- 7th – Kristopher Tapley, Hitfix

=== Lawsuit ===
Town officials from Mahwah, New Jersey, urged a boycott of the film due to negative depictions of Ramapough Mountain Indians, an Indigenous people living in the area of the Ramapo Mountains. They characterized the film's portrayal of this group as a hate crime. Relativity Media responded that the film "is not based on any one person or group" and is "entirely fictional". Nine members of the group, eight of whom have the surname DeGroat, the same as the lead character, filed suit against the makers and other involved parties, claiming that Out of the Furnace portrays a gang of "inbreds" living in the Ramapo Mountains who are "lawless, drug-addicted, impoverished and violent." The lawsuit asserts that "The Defendants, and each of them, knew or should have known that their actions would place Plaintiffs, and/or any person so situated in a false light." The suit continues, "The connection between the ethnic slur of 'Jackson Whites', with the location of the Ramapo Mountains of New Jersey', with a Bergen County Police patrol car, with the surnames 'DeGroat' and 'Van Dunk', is too specific to the Ramapough plaintiffs to be chance, coincidence or happenstance, and implies an element of knowledge on the part of the Defendants, or some of them."

On May 16, 2014, U.S. District Court Judge William Walls, sitting in Newark, New Jersey, dismissed the lawsuit, saying that the film did not refer directly to any of the plaintiffs.
