= For Sale by Owner (film) =

2009 horror film

- Directed by: Robert J. Wilson
- Written by: Scott Cooper
- Produced by: Scott Cooper; Rudy Hines; Robert J. Wilson
- Starring: Tom Skerritt; Skeet Ulrich; Kris Kristofferson; Scott Cooper; Rachel Nichols
- Cinematography: Bill Roe
- Edited by: Robert A. Ferretti
- Music by: Joseph Conlan
- Distributed by: Port Pictures; Monarch Home Video
- Release date: October 27, 2009
- Country: United States
- Language: English

For Sale by Owner is a 2009 horror film starring Scott Cooper and Rachel Nichols, with supporting performances by Tom Skerritt, Skeet Ulrich, Frankie Faison, and Kris Kristofferson.

== Plot ==
Will Custis (Scott Cooper) purchases a beat up older home in Virginia. Originally intent on making the house a fixer-upper project for the summer, Custis soon learns that house is not at all what it seems to be, with mysteries such as the man who sold him the house, Ferlin Smith (Kris Kristofferson) dying several years earlier in a car accident, and what the owners are of the sounds he continues to hear outside.

== Cast ==
- Tom Skerritt as Clive Farrier
- Skeet Ulrich as Junior
- Scott Cooper as Will Custis
- Rachel Nichols as Anna Farrier
- Joanna Cassidy as Linda Flannery
- Kris Kristofferson as Ferlin Smith
- Tom Bower as the Sheriff
- Frankie Faison as Gene Woodman
- James Keane as Lohman
- Aimee Teegarden as Elenore Dare
- Scott Wilson as Dr. Banks
