= Ira & Abby =

- Directed by: Robert Cary
- Written by: Jennifer Westfeldt
- Produced by: Brad Zions
- Starring: Chris Messina; Jennifer Westfeldt; Maddie Corman; Fred Willard; Frances Conroy; Jason Alexander; Robert Klein; Judith Light
- Cinematography: Harlan Bosmajian
- Edited by: Phillip J. Bartell
- Music by: Marcelo Zarvos
- Distributed by: Magnolia Pictures
- Release dates: June 23, 2006 (Los Angeles Film Festival); September 14, 2007 (United States)
- Running time: 104 minutes
- Country: United States
- Language: English

Ira & Abby is a 2006 American romantic comedy film directed by Robert Cary and written by Jennifer Westfeldt. The film stars Chris Messina and Westfeldt in the title roles, and co-stars Fred Willard, Frances Conroy, Jason Alexander, Robert Klein, and Judith Light.

The film premiered at the Los Angeles Film Festival on June 23, 2006. It was acquired by Magnolia Pictures, who released it theatrically on September 14, 2007.

== Plot ==
Ira Black is a 33-year-old psychology Ph.D. candidate with therapist parents. He has been in an on-and-off relationship with Lea for the past nine years and is unsatisfied with their relationship on many levels. His therapist informs him that their 12 years of doctor-patient relationship must come to a close as therapy clearly is not helping him. The therapist encourages Black to be spontaneous, finish his dissertation, and do things he would not normally do.

Ira goes to his favorite cafe and struggles to order. As he eats, he looks across the street to see a gym and remembers that Lea once found him overweight. After his meal, he goes to the gym and makes an appointment for a tour. He waits 45 minutes before Abby, a free-spirited gym-membership saleswoman, arrives to show him around.

Ira is soon struck by Abby's ability to be involved in other people's lives. She seems to know everyone at the gym and be a trusted source of advice and a good listening ear. After Abby gives Ira a tour of the gym, they spend the next six hours talking in an unused yoga room. Ira discovers that Abby lives with her parents who are musicians. At the end of their conversation, she proposes marriage to Ira, who is initially shocked. Eventually he agrees and the two consummate their engagement in her office.

Both Ira and Abby return home to tell their parents of their engagement. Ira's parents are upset that it's not Leah, and Abby's are extremely excited and begin to plan their daughter's wedding right away. Later that night, Ira and Abby talk about their future and make an agreement to have sex every day.

The two marry and spend the evening together at Abby's family's house. When they attempt to return to Ira's apartment to enjoy their wedding night, the car they hired breaks down, leading them to get mugged at gunpoint, though they are unharmed.

Over the next weeks, Ira and Abby adjust to being married and enjoy shopping for their apartment. They attend the movies and awkwardly run into Leah, which brings Ira's worries about Abby to the front of his mind. The two begin marriage counseling. At the same time, Ira's mother and Abby's father begin to have an affair after Ira's mother begins a voice-over career. When the families take a holiday picture (Abby's family's tradition), Ira learns that Abby was married twice before. Angry that she did not tell him, Ira asks for and gets an annulment. After returning to Dr. Friedman (his old therapist) and realizing how much he loves Abby, Ira proposes again, and the two remarry.

After the second wedding, with the two ex-husbands in attendance, things seem to get better. One day, Abby meets Leah at the gym, and Leah confides in her that she misses her ex. Not realizing that she is talking about Ira, Abby offers her advice; that she should get in contact with him for closure. Not long after that, Abby goes to dinner with one of her ex-husbands. Ira is extremely worried, so he takes Leah up on her offer for drinks. The two go to her apartment and kiss. Guilt-racked Ira returns home to find Abby sobbing on their couch, afraid that he was cheating and emotionally rattled from her dinner. The next day, Leah and Abby meet for lunch and discuss their evenings. When Ira walks in to meet Abby, the two women realize that he is the man they are both talking about.

Following this latest escapade, Abby pulls all of the therapists that she, her parents, Ira, and Ira's parents have ever used into one room for a giant session. After a while, Ira and Abby realize that they can put their differences aside and love each other. The film ends with the two of them divorcing and vowing to love each other.

== Cast ==
- Chris Messina as Ira Black
- Jennifer Westfeldt as Abby Willoughby
- Fred Willard as Michael Willoughby
- Frances Conroy as Lynne Willoughby
- Jason Alexander as Dr. Morris Saperstein
- David Margulies as Dr. David Friedman
- Robert Klein as Seymour Black
- Judith Light as Arlene Black
- Maddie Corman as Lea
- Darrell Hammond as Dr. Rosenblum
- Donna Murphy as Dr. Goldman
- Chris Parnell as Dr. Ron Silverberg
- Kali Rocha as Tracy
- Kevin Sussman as Lenny
- Jon Hamm as Ronnie

== Critical reception ==
On review aggregate website Rotten Tomatoes, Ira & Abby has an approval rating of 69% based on 45 reviews. The site's critics consensus reads, "Ira & Abby overcomes the somewhat clichéd plot with witty dialogue and earnest performances."

In a positive review, Jeannette Catsoulis of The New York Times wrote, "Though playing at times like an extended sitcom, Ira & Abby radiates a breathless charm, due in no small part to Ms. Westfeldt’s sharp dialogue and engagingly unmannered performance." Catsoulis also praised the film's supporting cast and commented the film is "a breezy riff on monogamy, trust and how to make love last."

In The Boston Globe, Wesley Morris wrote "the crazy coincidences are unbearably mechanical", but praised Westfeldt's performance. Christopher Campbell of Cinematical commented "the movie is cynical about marriage", saying "It is possible the filmmakers intended the dated feel…in order to emphasize the statements that therapy and marriage are impractical fads that never went away; instead they mistakenly became norms." He concluded, "Ira and Abby is far from being an unlikable movie. It has a charming lunacy about it, which allows for much enjoyment, or at least comfortable, familiar, routine easiness (like a marriage)."
