= Hostiles (film) =

2017 film by Scott Cooper

- Theatrical release poster
- Directed by: Scott Cooper
- Screenplay by: Scott Cooper
- Story by: Donald E. Stewart
- Produced by: Scott Cooper; Ken Kao; John Lesher
- Starring: Christian Bale; Rosamund Pike; Wes Studi; Jesse Plemons; Adam Beach; Rory Cochrane; Ben Foster
- Cinematography: Masanobu Takayanagi
- Edited by: Tom Cross
- Music by: Max Richter
- Production companies: Waypoint Entertainment; Le Grisbi Productions; Bloom Media
- Distributed by: Entertainment Studios Motion Pictures
- Release dates: September 2, 2017 (Telluride); December 22, 2017 (United States)
- Running time: 133 minutes
- Country: United States
- Languages: English; Cheyenne
- Budget: $39–50 million
- Box office: $37 million

Hostiles is a 2017 American Western drama film written and directed by Scott Cooper, based on a story by Donald E. Stewart. It stars Christian Bale, Rosamund Pike, Wes Studi, and Ben Foster; Stephen Lang, Jesse Plemons, Rory Cochrane, Adam Beach, Q'orianka Kilcher, Jonathan Majors, and Timothée Chalamet appear in supporting roles. It follows a U.S. Army cavalry officer in 1892 who must escort a Cheyenne war chief and his family back to their home in Montana.

The film had its world premiere on September 2, 2017, at the Telluride Film Festival. It had a limited release in the United States by Entertainment Studios beginning December 22, 2017, before going wide on January 26, 2018. It received generally positive reviews from critics, and grossed $37 million worldwide.

== Plot ==
In the New Mexico Territory in 1892, settler Rosalee Quaid and her family are attacked by a Comanche war party, who kill her husband and three children. Rosalee escapes by hiding under a rock outcrop.

At Fort Berringer, soon-to-retire U.S. Army Captain Joseph Blocker is ordered by President Harrison to escort the cancer-stricken Cheyenne war chief Yellow Hawk and four members of his family back to their tribal lands in Montana. Blocker initially refuses, as Yellow Hawk and he are old enemies from the Great Sioux War of 1876, but accepts under the threat of court-martial and loss of his pension. Blocker sets out for Montana accompanied by his old friend, First Sergeant Thomas Metz, long-time aide Corporal Woodson, West Point newcomer Lieutenant Kidder, and a young private, Dejardin.

Blocker challenges Yellow Hawk to a knife fight, but he refuses. The group comes across the destroyed Quaid house, with a traumatized Rosalee sitting amongst the corpses of her family. After some convincing, Rosalee agrees to join the company until their next stop-over in Fort Winslow, Colorado. They are soon ambushed by the Comanche that killed the Quaids, who kill Dejardin and seriously injure Woodson before being forced to retreat. After the attack, Yellow Hawk persuades Blocker to unchain his family and him so they can help. The following day, the Comanche group is discovered dead, and Blocker correctly deduces that Yellow Hawk and his son Black Hawk snuck out of camp and killed them overnight.

At Fort Winslow, the group drops off the wounded Woodson, and Blocker arranges for Rosalee to stay with the fort's commander, but she chooses to remain with the group. Blocker is asked to bring disgraced Sergeant Philip Wills to be hanged for having deserted from Fort Pierce and murdered a Native family. Two members of the fort, Corporal Thomas and Sergeant Malloy, join Blocker's company to oversee Wills, who chastises Blocker and the Natives.

Near camp, the chief's daughter-in-law (Black Hawk's wife) Elk Woman, the chief's daughter Living Woman and Rosalee are abducted and raped by three fur traders. The group hunts down and kills the culprits; Malloy is killed in the fight. The next night, Metz walks into a downpour and begins to express guilt for his past actions against the Natives, leaving Blocker concerned. He asks for mercy from Chief Yellow Hawk before returning to his tent. Meanwhile, Wills feigns illness, allowing him to kill Kidder and escape. Blocker is awakened by Wills killing Kidder and wounds Wills as he escapes. Metz chases after him against Blocker's orders. The next day, the group finds that Metz killed Wills before dying by suicide. A devastated Blocker is consoled by Rosalee. They travel farther north as Yellow Hawk's condition continues to deteriorate. Blocker makes peace with the chief for the hardships they have inflicted upon one another over the years.

Yellow Hawk dies just as the group arrives at the tribal lands in Montana, where he is buried. As Blocker and others prepare to leave, a rancher and his three sons arrive and declare that they own the land, and order Blocker and the rest of the group to leave with the chief's body. Blocker informs them of the president's orders, only to be threatened at gunpoint. Blocker refuses, and a shootout ensues. Black Hawk, Living Woman, Elk Woman, and Corporal Thomas are killed and buried next to the chief.

Rosalee decides to take Black Hawk's orphan son, Little Bear, with her to Chicago. At the train station, the two thank and bid an emotional farewell to Blocker. He hands Little Bear a gift - his copy of Julius Caesar's The Gallic War. As the train departs, Blocker decides to step aboard.

== Cast ==
- Christian Bale, as Capt. Joseph J. Blocker, a veteran of the Indian Wars.
- Rosamund Pike, as Rosalee Quaid, a widow who joins Blocker's detail after the murder of her family by Comanches.
- Wes Studi, as Chief Yellow Hawk, an imprisoned and sickly Cheyenne leader being taken home to die, and the father of Black Hawk and Living Woman.
- Jesse Plemons, as Lt. Rudy Kidder, a fresh West Point graduate, part of the detail to escort Yellow Hawk home.
- Adam Beach, as Black Hawk, Yellow Hawk's son and Elk Woman's husband.
- Rory Cochrane, as 1st Sgt. Thomas Metz, a Confederate veteran who is now in the United States Cavalry. He is war-weary and is among Blocker's oldest friends, part of the detail to escort Yellow Hawk home.
- Peter Mullan, as Lt. Col. Ross McCowan, the commander of Fort Winslow, Colorado.
- Scott Wilson, as Cyrus Lounde, the owner of Yellow Hawk's ancestral land. Hostiles marks Wilson’s final film before his death in 2018.
- Paul Anderson, as Cpl. Tommy Thomas, a British-born soldier from Fort Winslow escorting Wills to his hanging.
- Timothée Chalamet, as Pvt. Philippe Dejardin, the youngest member of the detail to escort Yellow Hawk home.
- Ben Foster, as Sgt. Philip Wills, a criminal soldier whom Blocker is charged with escorting to his hanging.
- Jonathan Majors, as Cpl. Henry Woodson, a Black soldier who served under Blocker for many years, and part of the detail to escort Yellow Hawk home.
- John Benjamin Hickey as Cpt. Royce Tolan, Fort Berringer's resident military surgeon.
- Q'orianka Kilcher, as Elk Woman, Black Hawk's wife.
- Tanaya Beatty, as Living Woman, Yellow Hawk's daughter.
- Stephen Lang, as Col. Abraham Biggs, Blocker's commanding officer
- Bill Camp, as Jeremiah Wilks, a frontier correspondent for Harper's Weekly.
- Scott Shepherd, as Wesley Quaid, Rosalee's husband.
- Ryan Bingham, as Sgt. Malloy, a soldier from Fort Winslow escorting Wills to his hanging.
- Robyn Malcolm, as Minnie McCowan, Col. McCowan's wife.
- Luce Rains, as Virgil Lounde, one of the sons of Cyrus Lounde.

== Production ==
Cooper wrote Hostiles, based on a decades old manuscript (the eighties) by the late screenwriter Donald E. Stewart.

The project was announced in February 2016 with Scott Cooper as director and Christian Bale starring. In March, Rosamund Pike was cast, and a production start date of July was announced. In April, Jesse Plemons was cast. Wes Studi and Adam Beach were signed in June. In mid-July, Timothée Chalamet joined the cast.

Filming began late July in Santa Fe, New Mexico, with some filming later in September in Westcliffe, Colorado. Ben Foster was added to the cast at the beginning of filming. Ryan Bingham, who also stars in the film, wrote and performed "How Shall A Sparrow Fly" for the soundtrack. Max Richter composed the score for the film, which was released by Deutsche Grammophon.

== Release ==
The film had its world premiere at the Telluride Film Festival on September 2, 2017. It was also screened at the Toronto International Film Festival on September 10, 2017. Shortly after, Entertainment Studios acquired U.S. distribution rights to the film. It was in a limited release in the United States on December 22, 2017, before expanding wide a month later.

== Reception ==
=== Box office ===
Hostiles grossed $29.8 million in the United States and Canada, and $7.2 million in other territories, for a worldwide total of $37 million.

In the United States and Canada, following several weeks in a limited run, in which it grossed $1.8 million, Hostiles had its wide expansion alongside the release of Maze Runner: The Death Cure, and was expected to gross around $10 million from 2,813 theaters over the weekend. It ended up opening to $10.1 million, finishing third behind The Death Cure ($24.2 million) and holdover Jumanji: Welcome to the Jungle ($16.1 million). In its second weekend the film dropped 49.5% to $5.1 million, finishing fifth at the box office.

=== Critical response ===
On review aggregator website Rotten Tomatoes, the film has an approval rating of 71% based on 224 reviews, with an average rating of 6.8/10. The website's critical consensus reads, "Hostiles benefits from stunning visuals and a solid central performance from Christian Bale, both of which help elevate its uneven story." On Metacritic, the film has a weighted average score of 65 out of 100, based on 41 critics, indicating "generally favorable" reviews. Audiences polled by CinemaScore gave the film an average grade of "B" on an A+ to F scale, while PostTrak reported filmgoers gave it an overall 72% positive score.

Following its world premiere at the Telluride Film Festival, Sasha Stone of TheWrap wrote of the audiences' reaction to the film, saying, "Riveted by the glorious storytelling of Hostiles, a few Telluride audience members burst into spontaneous applause as it built to its conclusion". Todd McCarthy of The Hollywood Reporter wrote praise of the film and of the performance of Christian Bale, concluding that the film is an "estimable piece of work grounded by a fine-grain sensibility and an expertly judged lead performance".

William Bibbiani of IGN said that director Scott Cooper wasted the talent of its actors and cinematographer in a "by-the-numbers storyline with a rather obvious message about how it's harder to be despicable to people after you get to know them". He went on to say, "Scott Cooper directs Hostiles with an eye for 'greatness', but the actual material simply isn't deep enough to justify the solemn presentation. It's not entertaining, it's not illuminating, it's not even complicated. It's mostly just a bummer".

Writing in The Atlantic, David Sims noted the film's "majestic photography", calling it "a handsome-looking Western", but faulted the script for "seem[ing] less interested in character development" and was critical of the "harsh and uncompromising" tone of the film, describing its opening scenes as "gory, tough to watch, and short on dialogue, with Cooper intent on showing a world severely lacking in empathy." Godfrey Cheshire reviewed the film for RogerEbert.com wrote: "A film that's beautifully shot and acted, but also meandering, overlong and only sporadically focused on its central issues."

=== Other response ===
Jesse Wente, a First Nations culture critic and the director of film programmes for the Toronto International Film Festival (TIFF), believed Hostiles was deeply racist and asked TIFF not to show it. After TIFF went ahead with it, Wente resigned.

The National Congress of American Indians (NCAI) lauded Hostiles for its "authentic representation of Native peoples" and accurate rendition of Native American languages.

=== Accolades ===
Award	Date of ceremony	Category	Recipients	Result	Ref.
San Diego Film Critics Society	December 11, 2017	Best Costume Design	Jenny Eagan	Nominated	
Saturn Awards	June 27, 2018	Best Action or Adventure Film	Hostiles	Nominated	
Saturn Awards	June 27, 2018	Best Actress	Rosamund Pike	Nominated	
