= Friends with Kids =

- Theatrical release poster
- Directed by: Jennifer Westfeldt
- Written by: Jennifer Westfeldt
- Produced by: Riza Aziz; Joey McFarland; Joshua Astrachan; Jake Kasdan; Jon Hamm; Jennifer Westfeldt
- Starring: Adam Scott; Jennifer Westfeldt; Jon Hamm; Kristen Wiig; Maya Rudolph; Chris O'Dowd; Megan Fox; Edward Burns
- Cinematography: William Rexer II
- Edited by: Tara Timpone
- Music by: Marcelo Zarvos and The 88
- Production companies: Red Granite Pictures; Points West Pictures; Locomotive
- Distributed by: Lionsgate; Roadside Attractions
- Release dates: September 9, 2011 (TIFF); March 9, 2012 (United States)
- Running time: 100 minutes
- Country: United States
- Language: English
- Budget: <$10 million
- Box office: $13 million

Friends with Kids is a 2011 American romantic comedy film written, produced, and directed by Jennifer Westfeldt, who also stars in the film. Adam Scott, Jon Hamm, Kristen Wiig, Maya Rudolph, Chris O'Dowd, Megan Fox, and Edward Burns also star in the film.

== Plot ==
Jason (an advertising executive) and Julie (a charitable investment advisor) are longtime best friends now in their mid-30s that live in the same building in Manhattan. Not romantically involved, they are close friends with two childless married couples, the placid Alex and Leslie and the sex-obsessed Ben and Missy.

During the next four years, after both couples have children, their marriages suffer. Following a chaotic birthday party for Jason at Alex and Leslie's place in Brooklyn, Jason and Julie discuss how it would be better to have children first, to 'get it out of the way' since 'time is running out', and only then meet the person that you wanted to marry.

After more discussion, Jason and Julie decide to have a child together, despite never having had romantic feelings for each other, and then to continue to date other people, to find 'their one'. Although their friends predict disaster, they adjust to their new relationship with baby Joe far better than their friends had imagined.

Jason and Julie begin dating again and enter into budding relationships with young actress Mary Jane and divorced father Kurt, respectively. During a couples winter getaway in Vermont, Ben calls Jason and Julie's thought process and parenting skills into question. In the ensuing argument, Ben decries their arrangement as untenable in the long term and humiliates Missy. Jason defends his decision to have a child with Julie, saying that he loves her deeply and that she was the soundest choice of person for him to start a family with.

After returning from Vermont, Ben and Missy separate and later divorce. Shortly thereafter, at Julie's birthday dinner out (about 18 months after Joe's birth), Jason is surprised to find that she invited only him. Julie tells him that Kurt wants her to meet his children that weekend but that this new degree of commitment has made her realize that she is in love with Jason, who, along with Joe, have become her closest family.

A stunned Jason tells Julie that his love for her has never been romantic and has asked Mary Jane to move in with him. Heartbroken, Julie leaves the restaurant, and soon moves out of her Manhattan apartment to Brooklyn, putting some space between herself and Jason. A few months thereafter, Jason and Mary Jane break up over their differing feelings about children, and both Julie and Jason return to dating others.

Several months later, at a bar with Ben, Jason confides that he does have feelings for Julie, but that their messy split makes acting on such feelings impossible. Ben disagrees, noting the differences between his and Missy's sex-based relationship and Jason and Julie's long-lasting friendship.

Shortly before Julie's next birthday, after dropping 2 1/2-year-old Joe off at Julie's house after a day out, Jason presents her with a present: a photo scrapbook of the couple, and then the three of them (that he'd made for her birthday prior, but she never received due to their abrupt parting), consistent with Julie's prior statement that Jason and Joe were her family. They reminisce over several of the photos and then put Joe to bed, after Jason says a few things about 'staying the night' (as Joe wants him to).

Jason's emotional shift and words make Julie emotional and uncomfortable, so she sends Jason home. He leaves, but quickly returns, and tells her what he said to her a year ago was all wrong. Jason finally realized it—Julie is the love of his life, she is his 'person', "and that's just the way it is". She tells him she can't be with someone who isn't 'into' her, and he, after a passionate kiss, offers to have sex with her to prove he is into her, in every possible way. Julie accepts his offer, passionately kisses Jason back, and they tumble onto her bed.

== Cast ==
- Adam Scott as Jason Fryman
- Jennifer Westfeldt as Julie Keller
- Jon Hamm as Ben
- Kristen Wiig as Missy
- Maya Rudolph as Leslie
- Chris O'Dowd as Alex
- Megan Fox as Mary Jane
- Edward Burns as Kurt
- Lee Bryant as Elaine Keller, Julie's mother
- Kelly Bishop as Mary Fryman, Jason's mother
- Cotter Smith as Phil Fryman, Jason's father
- Ilana Levine as Mom in Restaurant
- Brian D'Arcy James as Husband in Restaurant
- John Lutz as Jason's Colleague at Work
- Derek Cecil as Pete

== Production ==
Friends with Kids was directed, written, produced and stars Jennifer Westfeldt. This was her directorial debut. Her then-partner, actor Jon Hamm, also agreed to play a supporting part and help produce her feature film. The idea for Friends with Kids had been floating around after Westfeldt and Hamm noticed that friends were starting to have families and 'all but disappearing from their lives.' Cast member Adam Scott admitted that the couple's suspicion was not baseless, as he and his wife had become "the worst friends to Jen and Jon because we were so busy" after getting married and having children. She was encouraged to move forward with her idea after an informal reading of the screenplay took place at her and Hamm's home in late 2010.

It was always planned that Hamm would star in the movie, but in a role where he would not be paired-up with his real-life partner. However, this left only a few months open between when Hamm finished doing the fourth season of Mad Men and would resume for a fifth to get Friends with Kids off the ground and ready to shoot. According to one of the producers, resources for the production were easy to find. "The impossible algorithm is to line up the cast, the calendar and the cash in such a way that you get to make the movie", said co-producer Joshua Astrachan. "It just never is that easy to put an independent film together."

Principal photography lasted for four weeks, beginning in New York during December 2010 and carrying out into early 2011. With a budget of less than US$10 million, Friends with Kids was made by Red Granite Pictures, Points West Pictures, and Locomotive. Red Granite Pictures led by Riza Aziz and Joey McFarland also fully financed the film and distributed it internationally through Red Granite's distribution arm led by Danny Dimbort and Christian Mercuri.

The soundtrack to the film featured many Jazz staples including Duke Ellington's "Angelica", which is performed by Brian Newman, Alex Smith, Paul Francis, and Steve Whipple.

== Release ==
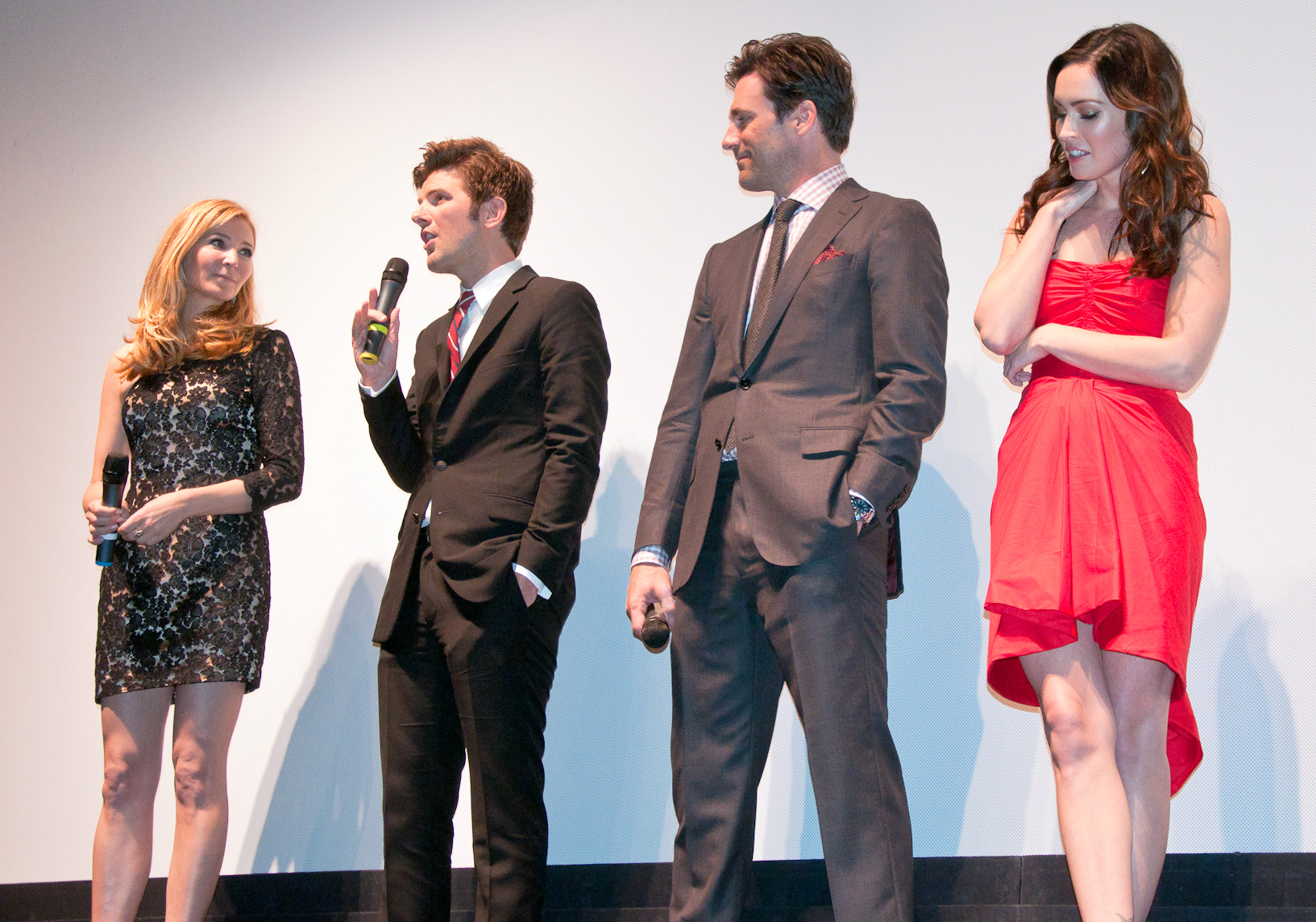
Jennifer Westfeldt, Adam Scott, Jon Hamm, Megan Fox at TIFF 2011

The film premiered at the 2011 Toronto International Film Festival on September 9, 2011. On September 21, 2011, Lionsgate announced that it had acquired the distribution rights to the film.

It was released in the United States and Canada on March 9, 2012, Sweden on June 1, 2012, and Australia on June 7, 2012.

=== Critical response ===
Friends with Kids received mostly positive reviews from critics. The film received a 66% rating on Rotten Tomatoes based on 151 reviews and an average rating of 6.5/10. The website's critical consensus reads, "Sharp, shrewd, and funny, Friends with Kids features excellent performances that help smooth over some of the story's more conventional elements." On Metacritic, the film has a score of 55 out of 100 based on 36 reviews, indicating "mixed or average" reviews.

== Home media ==
The DVD was released on July 17, 2012. It includes audio commentaries, deleted scenes, a blooper reel and an 8 minute mini-featurette on why the film came to be made.
