= Springsteen: Deliver Me from Nowhere =

2025 film by Scott Cooper

- Theatrical release poster
- Directed by: Scott Cooper
- Screenplay by: Scott Cooper
- Based on: Deliver Me from Nowhere by Warren Zanes
- Produced by: Scott Cooper; Ellen Goldsmith-Vein; Eric Robinson; Scott Stuber
- Starring: Jeremy Allen White; Jeremy Strong; Paul Walter Hauser; Stephen Graham; Odessa Young
- Cinematography: Masanobu Takayanagi
- Edited by: Pamela Martin
- Music by: Jeremiah Fraites
- Production companies: 20th Century Studios; Gotham Group; Night Exterior; Bluegrass 7 Entertainment
- Distributed by: 20th Century Studios
- Release dates: August 29, 2025 (Telluride); October 24, 2025 (United States)
- Running time: 119 minutes
- Country: United States
- Language: English
- Budget: $55 million
- Box office: $45 million

Springsteen: Deliver Me from Nowhere is a 2025 American biographical musical drama film starring Jeremy Allen White as Bruce Springsteen. Written and directed by Scott Cooper, and based on the 2023 book Deliver Me from Nowhere by Warren Zanes, as well as some elements from Springsteen's 2016 autobiography Born to Run, it chronicles Springsteen's personal and professional struggles during the conception of his 1982 album Nebraska. The film also stars Jeremy Strong, Paul Walter Hauser, Stephen Graham, and Odessa Young.

Springsteen: Deliver Me from Nowhere had its world premiere at the 52nd Telluride Film Festival on August 29, 2025, and was theatrically released in United States by 20th Century Studios on October 24, 2025. It received mixed reviews from critics, with White's and Strong's performances receiving praise, but was criticized for the small scope of its plot, and was a box-office bomb, grossing only $45 million on a $55 million budget.

== Plot ==
In 1981 Bruce Springsteen reaches the end of The River Tour, his latest sold-out concert tour. Jon Landau, his manager and producer, rents a house for Bruce to lie low from his growing fame near Freehold, New Jersey where he grew up.

Bruce's friend and mechanic Matt drives him to the house in Colts Neck and Bruce buys his first new car, a Chevrolet Camaro. Playing with local bands at the Stone Pony, he meets Faye Romano, an old classmate's younger sister. On the heels of his first top-ten song "Hungry Heart", his record label expects another hit album but Bruce suggests trimming studio costs by preparing a demo himself.

Bruce has a troubled relationship with his father Douglas, an alcoholic battling mental health issues, which drove a young Bruce to defend his mother Adele with a baseball bat. Reading the works of Flannery O'Connor, Bruce catches the film Badlands on TV and is drawn to research the crime spree of Charles Starkweather. Inspired, he writes a song in the killer's own voice and takes Faye on a date to Asbury Park.

At the house Bruce enlists his guitar technician Mike Batlan to turn the bedroom into a makeshift studio with a four-track recorder to arrange the demo themselves. Growing close to Faye and her young daughter Haley, Bruce writes a collection of stark, somber songs with a blue-collar perspective, influenced by his childhood memories, especially of his father. Jon informs Bruce of other opportunities piling up, including a possible movie role but Bruce is committed to his new music. Recording his new tracks unaccompanied, he makes the risky choice to embrace an imperfect, unvarnished sound quality.

Mike brings Jon the only copy of the completed demo, a single cassette tape and Jon confides in his wife about the unexpectedly darker, deeply personal songs. Living in California, Adele calls Bruce for help with an increasingly erratic Douglas. After visiting his father, Bruce arrives in New York City to record the new album, reuniting with the E Street Band. They lay down several successful tracks, including "Born in the U.S.A.", but Bruce is unhappy with the overall full-band studio sound of the record.

After two weeks of recording, Bruce has not recaptured his acoustic vision for the album. Abandoning Faye, he insists on shelving the potential hits until he is satisfied. Jon agrees to use Bruce's raw demo, unchanged, as the new record, suspecting Bruce fears losing himself in the face of success. Using older equipment to re-create the demo tape as a vinyl master recording, Bruce's original sound is successfully preserved for the new album, Nebraska.

Record executive Al Teller is dismayed by the stylistic departure and the absence of the prospective hits but Jon defends Bruce's artistic vision and decision to let the album speak for itself — no singles, tours or press appearances, not even his face on the cover. Bruce tells Faye that he is moving to Los Angeles alone and she tearfully accuses him of refusing to face his fears. He suffers a mental breakdown as Matt drives him across the country but they reach his new home in L.A. Contemplating suicide, Bruce reaches out to Jon, who urges him to seek professional help and an emotional Bruce visits a therapist.

Ten months later Bruce is back on tour with Jon's support and is visited by his proud parents. Douglas asks the 32-year-old Bruce to sit on his lap for the first time, reconnecting with his son. An epilogue reveals that Nebraska reached number three on the charts, while the hits that were initially shelved are included on Bruce's following album, Born in the U.S.A., which launched him to global superstardom, as he continued to seek treatment for depression.

== Cast ==
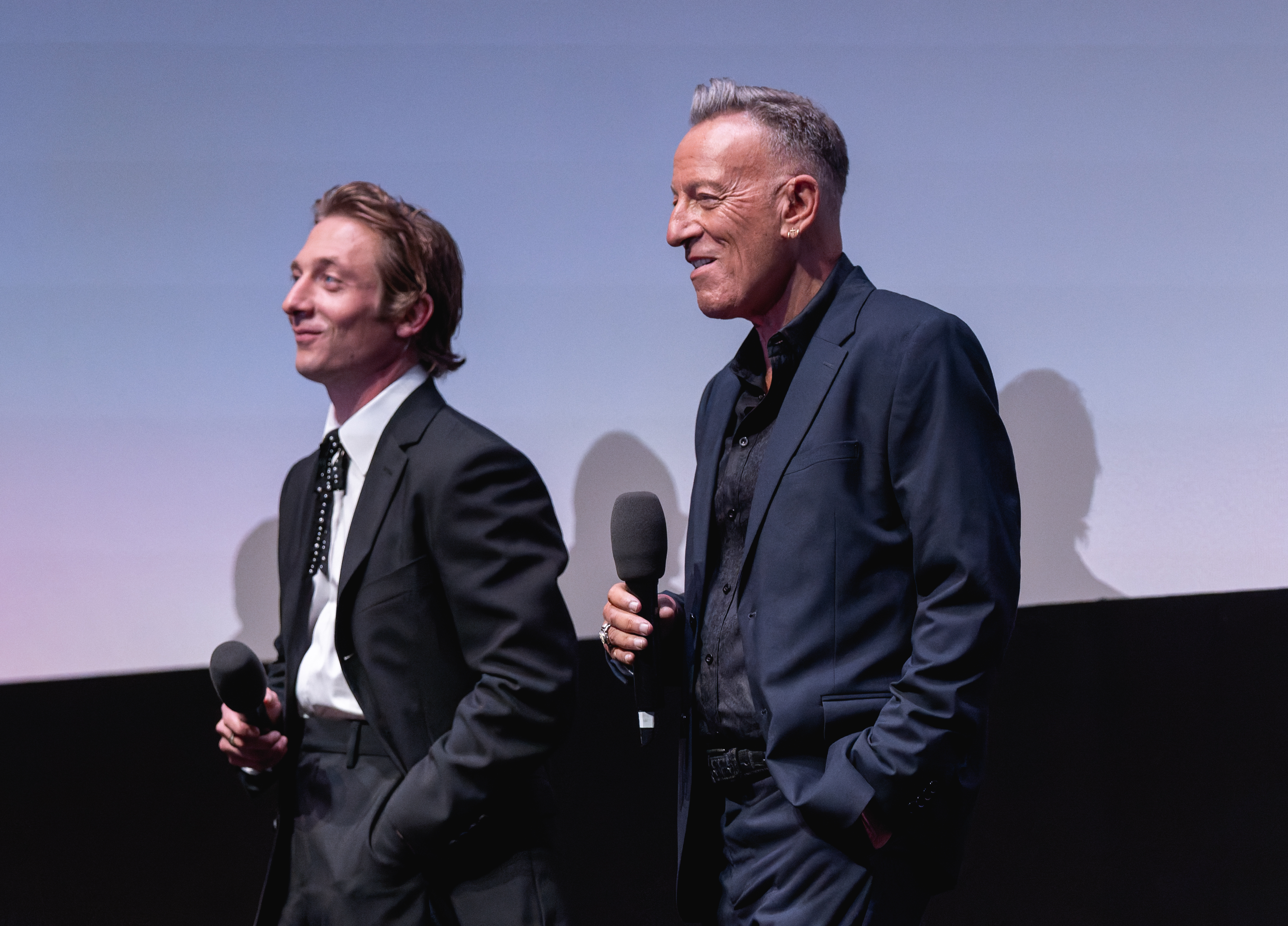
Jeremy Allen White (left) portrays Bruce Springsteen (right).

- Jeremy Allen White as Bruce Springsteen
  - Matthew Anthony Pellicano as young Bruce Springsteen
- Jeremy Strong as Jon Landau, Springsteen's manager and record producer
- Paul Walter Hauser as Mike Batlan, Springsteen's recording engineer during the Nebraska sessions
- Stephen Graham as Douglas Springsteen, Bruce's father with whom he had a complicated relationship
- Odessa Young as Faye Romano, Bruce's love interest
- Gaby Hoffmann as Adele Springsteen, Bruce's mother
- Marc Maron as Chuck Plotkin, Springsteen's producer and mixing engineer
- David Krumholtz as Al Teller, the record executive at Columbia
- Harrison Gilbertson as Matt Delia, Springsteen's close friend
- Grace Gummer as Barbara Landau, Jon's wife
- Chris Jaymes as Dennis King, the mastering engineer
- Johnny Cannizzaro as Steven Van Zandt, the guitarist for the E Street Band
- Brian Chase as Max Weinberg, the drummer for the E Street Band
- Jimmy Iovine as himself (voice only)
- Jay Buchanan, Jake Kiszka, and Sam Kiszka as Cats on a Smooth Surface, the house band at The Stone Pony

== Production ==
In March 2024, the project was first announced, with Bruce Springsteen and his manager Jon Landau said to be actively involved with it. Producers are Scott Stuber, his first project since leaving as Chief of Film at Netflix, Ellen Goldsmith-Vein, Scott Cooper, and Eric Robinson (who first identified the story and, together with Goldsmith-Vein, brought the project to Cooper), with Cooper writing and directing the adaptation of Zanes' non-fiction book Deliver Me from Nowhere: The Making of Bruce Springsteen's Nebraska (2023). Zanes was also named an Executive Producer. Jeremy Allen White was reported to be in talks to portray Springsteen and A24 was expected to acquire the distribution rights.

In order to authentically portray Springsteen, White took singing lessons, guitar lessons, harmonica lessons and worked with a movement coach. While some Springsteen master recordings were used in the film, White was the one singing when he was shown performing in the movie. Springsteen also could not tell at certain points whether it was White or himself singing.

In April 2024, it was revealed that 20th Century Studios had acquired the film in a heated bidding war with A24, joining the project as financier and distributor.

=== Casting ===
In May 2024, Jeremy Strong was reported to be in talks to play Jon Landau. Strong confirmed the casting in October 2024. In June 2024, Paul Walter Hauser and Odessa Young joined the cast. In September 2024, Stephen Graham joined the cast as Springsteen's father Douglas, while Harrison Gilbertson and Johnny Cannizzaro were added the following month, in October 2024. In November 2024, it was announced that Marc Maron, Gaby Hoffmann, and David Krumholtz had joined the cast.

=== Filming ===
On October 28, 2024, principal photography began. Filming took place primarily in New York and New Jersey, with additional photography in Los Angeles.

On November 1 and 4, 2024, Springsteen made special visits to the sets in Rockaway and Bayonne, New Jersey, respectively, where he met with White. The following month, on December 10 and 11, 2024, Springsteen also visited the sets in Asbury Park. This was followed by visits to the sets in the Meadowlands, on January 8 and 9, and then those in Freehold Borough, on January 10, 2025.

On January 11, 2025, filming wrapped, in Asbury Park.

== Release ==
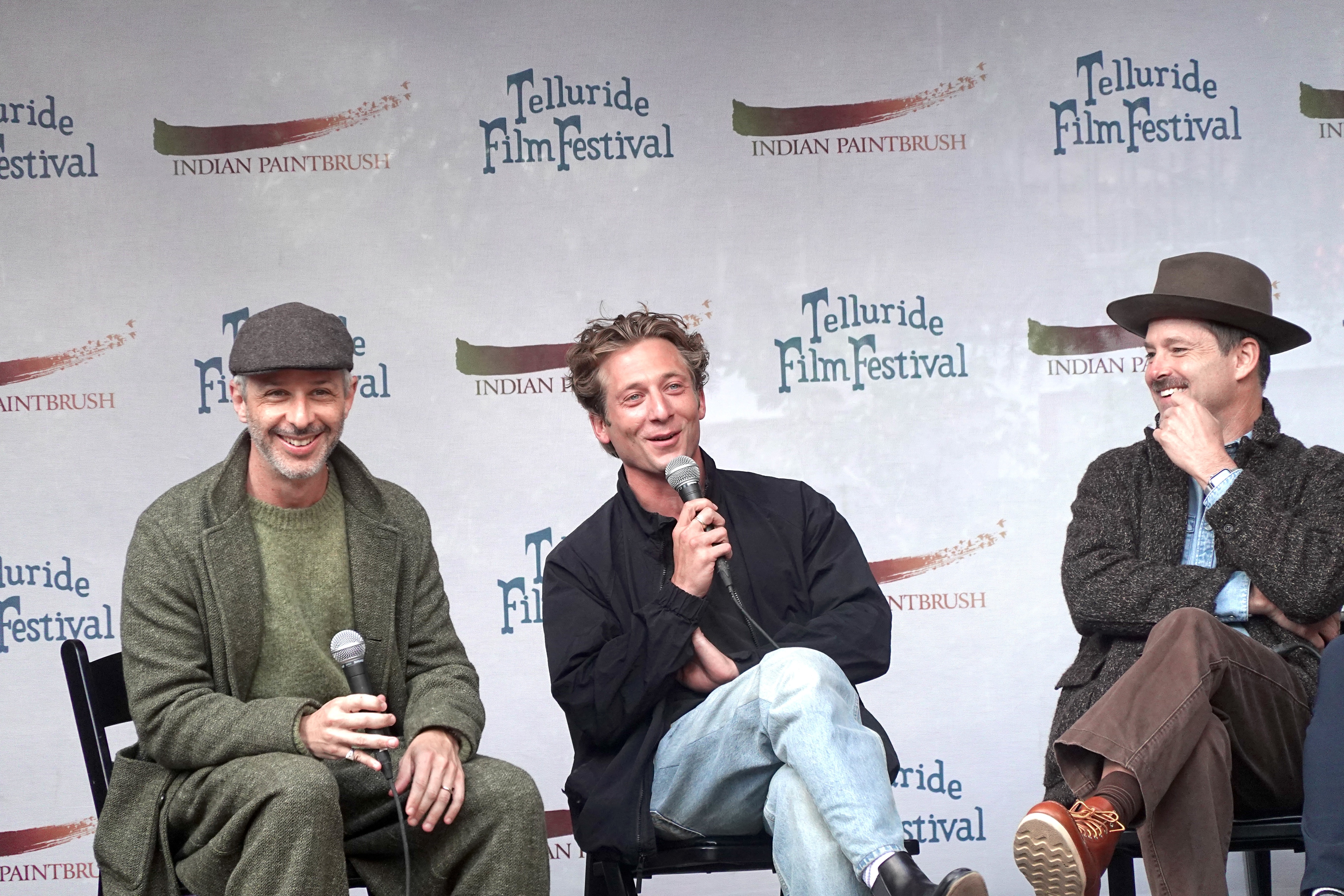
Jeremy Strong, Jeremy Allen White and Scott Cooper at the 2025 Telluride Film Festival

Springsteen: Deliver Me from Nowhere had its world premiere at the 52nd Telluride Film Festival on August 29, 2025, and was released theatrically by 20th Century Studios on October 24, 2025.

=== Home media ===
Springsteen: Deliver Me From Nowhere was released on digital platforms on December 23, 2025 and then released on 4K Ultra HD and on Blu-ray on January 20, 2026.

== Reception ==
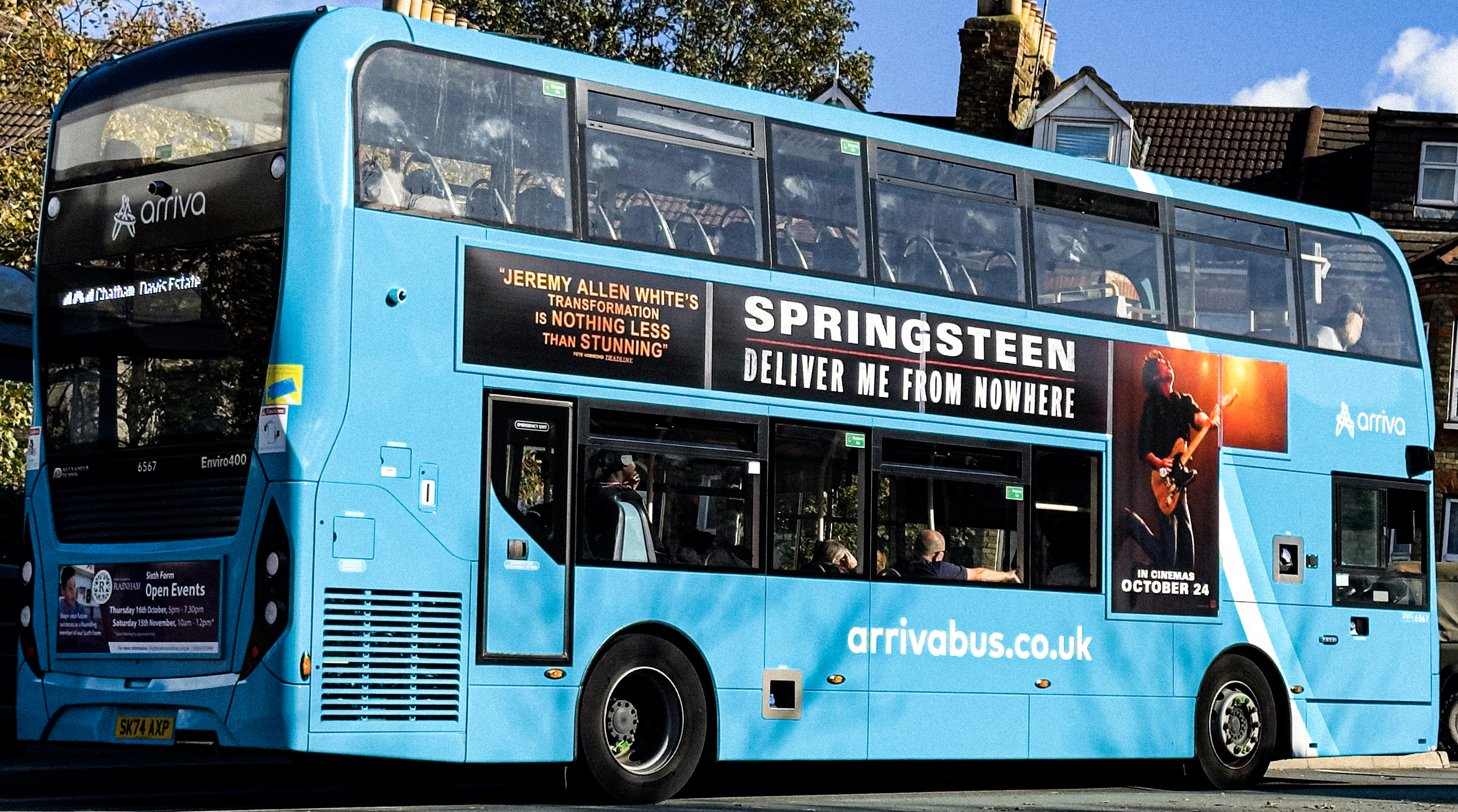
An advertisement on a bus for the film in Chatham, Kent, England.

=== Box office ===
Springsteen: Deliver Me from Nowhere has grossed $23 million in the United States and Canada and $22 million in other territories for a worldwide total of $45 million.

In the United States and Canada, Deliver Me from Nowhere was released alongside Regretting You Shelby Oaks and Chainsaw Man - The Movie: Reze Arc and was projected to gross $9–11 million from 3,460 theaters in its opening weekend. It ended up debuting to $9.1 million, finishing in fourth.

=== Critical response ===
Deliver Me from Nowhere divided film critics. White's and Strong's performances received praise but the film was criticized for the repetitive plot points and tropes of the musician biopics. On the review aggregator website Rotten Tomatoes, 61% of 253 critics' reviews are positive, with an average rating of 6.3/10. The website's consensus reads: "Focusing on Bruce Springsteen's lowest emotional ebb, this brooding biopic too often feels like the B-sides from an extraordinary career but benefits from Jeremy Allen White and Jeremy Strong's stellar performances." Metacritic, which uses a weighted average, assigned the film a score of 59 out of 100, based on 51 critics, indicating "mixed or average" reviews. Audiences polled by CinemaScore gave the film an average grade of "B+" on an A+ to F scale.

=== Accolades ===
Award	Date of ceremony	Category	Recipient(s)	Result	Ref.
AARP Movies for Grownups Awards	January 10, 2026	Best Director	Scott Cooper	Nominated	
AARP Movies for Grownups Awards	January 10, 2026	Best Period Film	Springsteen: Deliver Me from Nowhere	Won	
Astra Film Awards	January 9, 2026	Best Actor – Drama	Jeremy Allen White	Nominated	
Camerimage	November 22, 2025	Golden Frog	Masanobu Takayanagi	Nominated	
Golden Globe Awards	January 11, 2026	Best Actor in a Motion Picture – Drama	Jeremy Allen White	Nominated	
Gotham Independent Film Awards	December 1, 2025	Cultural Icon Tribute	Jeremy Allen White & Scott Cooper	Won	
Hollywood Music in Media Awards	November 19, 2025	Music Themed Film, Biopic or Musical	Scott Cooper	Nominated	
Santa Barbara International Film Festival	February 8, 2026	Virtuoso Award	Jeremy Allen White	Honored	
Set Decorators Society of America	February 21, 2026	Best Achievement in Décor/Design of a Period Feature Film	Kris Moran and Stefania Cella	Nominated	
