= Time Out (upcoming film) =

Upcoming American film by Scott Cooper

- Directed by: Scott Cooper
- Screenplay by: Scott Cooper
- Based on: Time Out by Robin Campillo and Laurent Cantet
- Produced by: Scott Cooper
- Starring: Adam Sandler; Willem Dafoe; Gaby Hoffmann; F. Murray Abraham; Steve Zahn; Adam Horovitz
- Cinematography: Masanobu Takayanagi
- Distributed by: Netflix
- Country: United States
- Language: English

Time Out is an upcoming American psychological drama film produced, written and directed by Scott Cooper, based on the 2001 French film. It stars Adam Sandler, Willem Dafoe, Gaby Hoffmann, F. Murray Abraham, Steve Zahn, and Adam Horovitz.

The film will be released on Netflix.

== Premise ==
After a man is fired from his job, he spins a web of lies to conceal his situation by creating an investment scheme and asking friends to contribute with the deception threatening to overwhelm his life and his family.

== Cast ==
- Adam Sandler as Vincent
- Willem Dafoe
- Gaby Hoffmann
- F. Murray Abraham
- Steve Zahn
- Adam Horovitz

== Production ==
In December 2022, Scott Cooper teased that he was developing an English-language "reimagining" of the French film Time Out (2001) with frequent collaborator Christian Bale attached to star. However, in March 2026, it was revealed that Adam Sandler would replace Bale. Netflix would distribute the film. Willem Dafoe, Gaby Hoffmann, F. Murray Abraham, Steve Zahn, and Adam Horovitz joined the cast in March.

Filming began on March 31, 2026, in Vancouver, Canada.
