= Joey McFarland =

American film producer

- Born: April 30, 1972 (age 54); Louisville, Kentucky, US
- Occupation: Film producer
- Notable work: The Wolf of Wall Street, Dumb and Dumber To
- Website: www.joeymcfarland.com

Joey McFarland (born April 30, 1972) is an American film producer and the founder of McFarland Entertainment, a content development and production company for both film and television. He was previously vice chairman of Red Granite Pictures, which he co-founded, and was nominated for the Academy Award for Best Picture as a producer of The Wolf of Wall Street.

== Life and career ==
McFarland was born in Louisville, Kentucky. He attended DeSales High School and the University of Louisville.

In 2010, with producing partner Riza Aziz, McFarland co-founded Red Granite Pictures. In 2011, Variety named McFarland to their list of Top 10 Producers to Watch.

McFarland's first production under the Red Granite banner was the romantic comedy, Friends with Kids. Written and directed by Jennifer Westfeldt, Friends with Kids also starred Jon Hamm, Adam Scott, Kristen Wiig, Maya Rudolph, and Chris O'Dowd. In 2012, McFarland went on to executive produce the dramatic thriller, Out of the Furnace, starring Christian Bale, Casey Affleck, Zoe Saldaña, and Forest Whitaker, and directed by Scott Cooper.

Next McFarland produced The Wolf of Wall Street. The Wolf of Wall Street is based upon Jordan Belfort's best-selling novel of the same name. The book was adapted into a screenplay by Terence Winter. The film stars Leonardo DiCaprio, Jonah Hill, Matthew McConaughey, and Margot Robbie, and was directed by Martin Scorsese. Released on December 25, 2013, by Paramount Pictures, The Wolf of Wall Street was a commercial hit and garnered critical acclaim including a Golden Globe win for Best Actor in a Motion Picture Comedy for star Leonardo DiCaprio and five Academy Award nominations including Best Actor, Best Director and Best Picture, for which McFarland was one of the nominated producers.

In 2013, McFarland completed production on Horns, a supernatural thriller starring Daniel Radcliffe, Juno Temple and directed by Alexandre Aja. The film is based on the best-selling novel by Joe Hill and was released October 31, 2014, by Dimension-RADiUS.

McFarland was also a producer on the sequel Dumb and Dumber To, directed by Pete and Bobby Farrelly. The film featured Jim Carrey and Jeff Daniels again playing Lloyd Christmas and Harry Dunne, respectively, and was released on November 14, 2014, by Universal Pictures. It opened number one at the box office to generally negative reviews.

McFarland was executive producer on the film Daddy's Home directed by Sean Anders and John Morris. Shot in New Orleans, it re-teamed Will Ferrell and Mark Wahlberg for the first time since 2010. Red Granite Pictures co-produced and co-financed the film with Paramount Pictures, in association with Gary Sanchez Productions. Paramount Pictures was also the worldwide distribution partner. The film was released on December 25, 2015.

McFarland produced Papillon, a remake of the 1973 film of the same name based on the best-selling autobiography by the French convict Henri Charrière. The film starred Charlie Hunnam as Henri Charrière ("Papillon"), and Rami Malek as Louis Dega. It premiered in September 2017 at the 2017 Toronto International Film Festival. Papillon was released August 24, 2018.

McFarland left Red Granite in late 2018 and that year formed McFarland Entertainment, an independent film and television production company.

== Malaysian 1MDB scandal ==
Red Granite, which McFarland co-founded with Riza Aziz, was named in US Justice Department civil forfeiture actions alleging that The Wolf of Wall Street and other assets were funded with money taken from the Malaysian 1MDB state fund; the company settled its case with the government for $60 million. Forfeiture complaints also targeted money in bank and escrow accounts traced to McFarland. In July 2019, McFarland agreed to surrender about US$14 million in artwork, luxury goods and company profits, including a vintage French King Kong poster and a Jean-Michel Basquiat drawing, which he had received as gifts from Jho Low and his associates and which the government alleged had been bought with 1MDB funds. McFarland said he had not known the items might have been bought with 1MDB money. He has not been charged with any crime.

== Emancipation premiere ==
McFarland produced Emancipation (2022), directed by Antoine Fuqua and starring Will Smith, through McFarland Entertainment. At the film's Los Angeles premiere in November 2022, he showed reporters on the red carpet what he said was an original 1863 print of the photograph of the formerly enslaved man known as "Whipped Peter" (Gordon), whose story inspired the film. The gesture was widely criticized. McFarland apologized on Instagram, saying he had intended to honor Peter and hoped the incident had not overshadowed the film's message.

== Filmography ==
He was producer for all films unless otherwise noted.

=== Film ===
| Year | Film | Credit |
|---|---|---|
| 2011 | Friends with Kids | |
| 2013 | Horns | |
| 2013 | Out of the Furnace | Executive producer |
| 2013 | The Wolf of Wall Street | |
| 2014 | Dumb and Dumber To | |
| 2015 | Daddy's Home | Executive producer |
| 2017 | Papillon | |
| 2022 | Emancipation | |

== Awards and nominations ==
| Year | Group | Award | Film | Result |
|---|---|---|---|---|
| 2014 | Academy Awards | Best Picture | The Wolf of Wall Street | Nominated |
| 2014 | Golden Globe Awards | Best Picture – Musical or Comedy | The Wolf of Wall Street | Nominated |
| 2014 | AFI Awards | Movie of the Year | The Wolf of Wall Street | Won |
| 2014 | PGA Awards | Outstanding Producer of Theatrical Motion Pictures | The Wolf of Wall Street | Nominated |
