= Riza Aziz =

Malaysian film producer

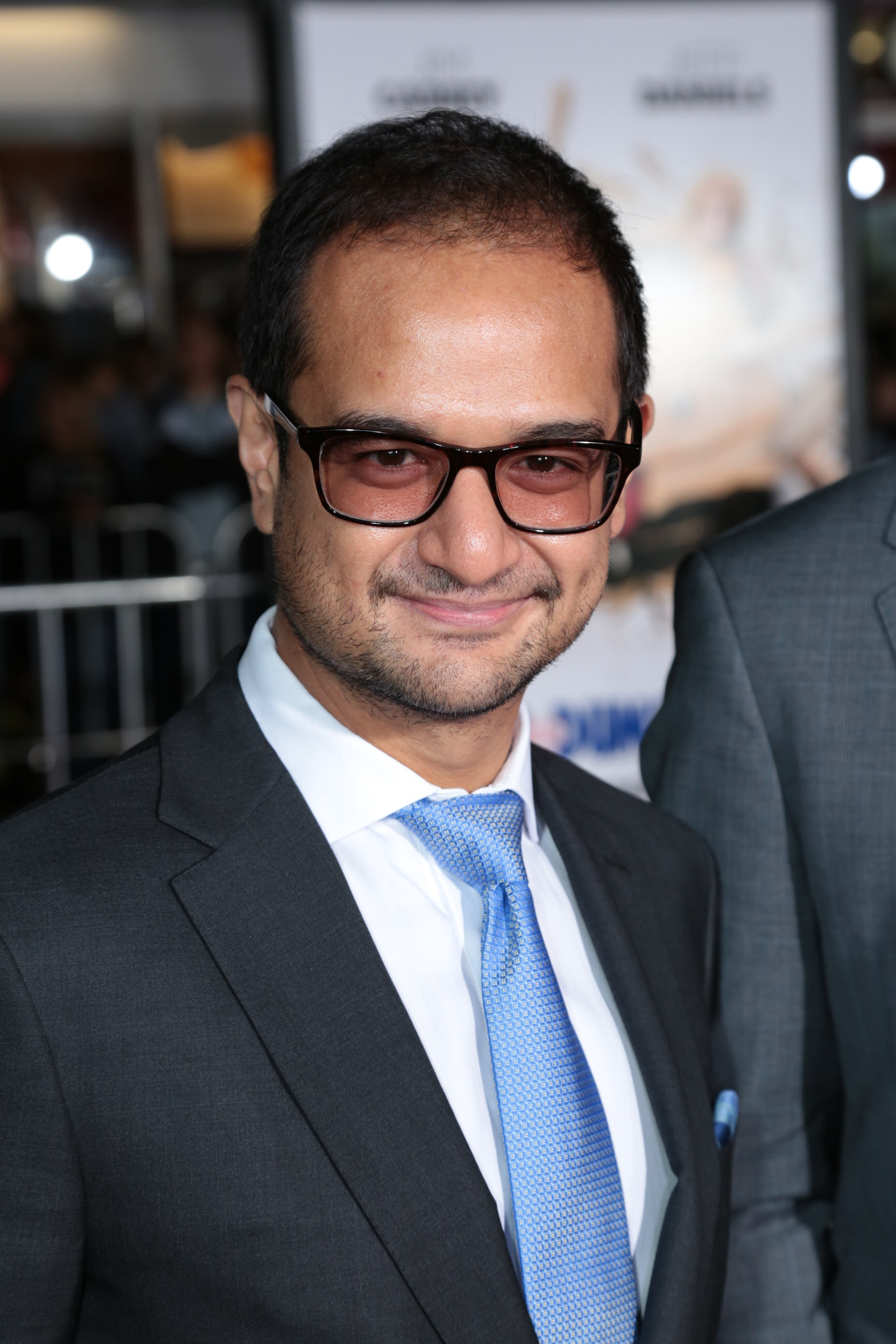
- Riza at the 2014 premiere of Dumb and Dumber To
- Born: Riza Shahriz bin Abdul Aziz; 1 January 1980 (age 46); Miri, Sarawak, Malaysia
- Occupations: Film Producer, Co-Founder and Chairman of Red Granite Pictures
- Parent(s): Abdul Aziz Nong Chik (father); Rosmah Mansor (mother)
- Website: www.redgranitepictures.com

Riza Shahriz bin Abdul Aziz (born 1 January 1980) is a Malaysian film producer and the co-founder of Red Granite Pictures, a Los Angeles–based film production company.

== Early life and education ==
Riza Shahriz bin Abdul Aziz was born on 1 January 1980 to Abdul Aziz Nong Chik and Rosmah Mansor in Malaysia. In 1987, his mother married politician Najib Razak who would later serve as Prime Minister of Malaysia, making him Najib Razak's stepson. His sister, also born to Abdul Aziz Nong Chik and Rosmah Mansor, is Azrene.

Riza studied at the London School of Economics, graduating in 2000 and obtaining a BS degree in government and economics and an M.S. in politics.

== Career ==
Riza worked from 2000 until 2002 with the accounting organization KPMG for two years, and then at HSBC in London from 2005 until the 2008 financial crisis.

In 2010, Riza co-founded Red Granite Pictures, an American film finance, development, production and distribution company, with producing partner Joey McFarland. Aziz served as both a producer and chairman for the independent company and started its slate with the hit romantic comedy, Friends with Kids.

In 2012, Riza went on to executive produce the dramatic thriller Out of the Furnace, released on December 6, 2013. Riza followed up with the highly anticipated film The Wolf of Wall Street, which was released on December 25, 2013. The film is banned in his native country, Malaysia.

Also in 2013, Riza completed production on Horns, a supernatural thriller. Riza co-produced the film Dumb and Dumber To released on November 14, 2014. Riza also co-produced and co-financed the comedy Daddy's Home. Riza's development slate includes The Brigands of Rattleborge blacklist's number 1 script of 2006, is a western revenge story, and The General a gritty look at the story of George Washington.

In 2011, Variety named Riza to their list of Top 10 Producers to Watch.

== Involvement in 1MDB scandal ==
In September 2015, the US Department of Justice investigated Riza's property transactions related to the role of Najib Razak in the 1Malaysia Development Berhad scandal. In July 2016, Riza was named in FBI's 1MDB lawsuit, as tens of millions of dollars in funds diverted from 1MDB were used to produce the 2013 Martin Scorsese film The Wolf of Wall Street. In 2017, it was revealed that Dumb and Dumber To and Daddy's Home were also financed by the Malaysian government investment fund through corrupt officials and financiers.

In March 2018, Red Granite Pictures agreed to pay US$60 million to the U.S. Justice Department to settle claims it had financed three films, Wolf of Wall Street, Daddy's Home, and Dumb and Dumber To using over US$100 million funds embezzled from 1MDB.

Riza has been known as a good friend of Low Taek Jho, who masterminded the 1MDB scandal and acquired assets (including luxury paintings, a superyacht, and several real estate assets, among others) using monies siphoned from the fund.

The Malaysian Anti-Corruption Commission (MACC) also investigated Riza's involvement in the 1MDB scandal and in July 2019, Riza was arrested on money laundering charges stemming from the MACC investigation. He pleaded not guilty to five money laundering charges, which accused him of receiving about US$248 million allegedly misappropriated from 1MDB. On May 14, 2020, the Kuala Lumpur Sessions Court granted him a discharge not amounting to an acquittal (DNAA) under an agreement with the prosecution, which said the charges would be reinstated if he did not complete it. The MACC said the government expected to recover overseas assets worth about US$107.3 million under the agreement, and that Riza would pay a compound as an alternative to the charges. In May 2021, 1MDB sued Riza and two Red Granite companies for US$248 million. It withdrew the suit on February 24, 2025, and the High Court ordered 1MDB to pay RM225,000 in costs and barred it from refiling. The judge said the costs order "does not in any way determine the liability of the defendants (Riza Aziz and Red Granite) or the merits of the plaintiff's (1MDB) claim".

== Filmography ==
Year	Film	Director	Other notes
2012	Children Rise	Billy Raftery	
2012	Friends with Kids	Jennifer Westfeldt	March 16, 2012
2013	Out of the Furnace	Scott Cooper	December 6, 2013
2013	The Wolf of Wall Street	Martin Scorsese	December 25, 2013
2013	Horns	Alexandre Aja	
2014	Dumb and Dumber To	Peter and Bobby Farrelly	
2014	Daddy's Home	Sean Anders and John Morris	
2016	Angels in Exile	Billy Raftery	
2017	Papillon	Michael Noer	May 7, 2017
