= Jennifer Westfeldt =

American actress, director, screenwriter, and producer (born 1970)

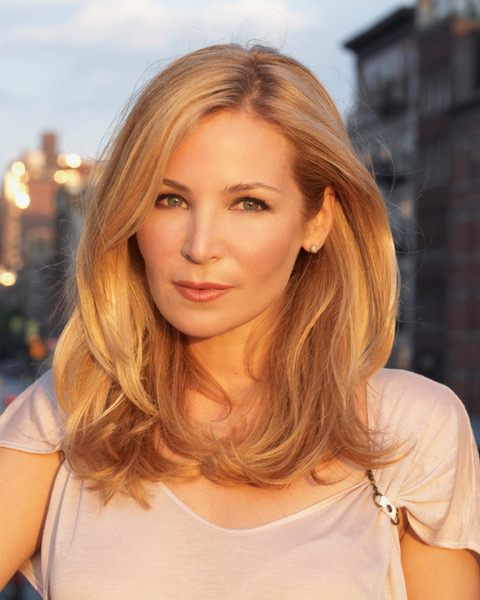
- Westfeldt in 2009
- Born: February 2, 1970 (age 56)
- Education: Yale University
- Occupations: Actress, screenwriter
- Years active: 1997–present
- Partner(s): Jon Hamm (1997–2015)

Jennifer Westfeldt (born February 2, 1970) is an American actress, director, screenwriter, and producer. She is best known for co-writing, co-producing, and starring in the 2002 indie film Kissing Jessica Stein, for which she received an Independent Spirit Award nomination for Best First Screenplay. She is also known for writing, producing, starring in, and making her directorial debut in the indie film Friends with Kids (2012).

Westfeldt's television work includes recurring roles on Notes from the Underbelly (2007–2009), Grey's Anatomy (2009), 24 (2010), and Younger (2017–2021) as well as guest starring on shows such as Girls, and This Is Us. Westfeldt made her Broadway debut in 2003 in the revival of Wonderful Town, earning a nomination for the Tony Award for Best Featured Actress in a Musical.

== Early life and education ==
Westfeldt is the daughter of Constance, a therapist, and Patrick M. Westfeldt Jr., an electrical engineer. Her mother later married Michael Perelson, also a therapist. Her older sister is journalist Amy Westfeldt. She grew up in Guilford, Connecticut, and attended Guilford High School, later attended Yale University, where she sang as a member of the a cappella group Redhot & Blue.

== Career ==
=== 1997–2005: Early roles and breakthrough ===
Upon graduating from Yale University with a B.A. in Theater Studies, Westfeldt started her career as a New York-based theater actress, starring in dozens of regional and Off-Broadway productions, including the long-running Off-Broadway musical The Fantasticks. In 1997, she was cast as a series regular on the 20th Century Fox/ABC sitcom Two Guys, a Girl and a Pizza Place, alongside Ryan Reynolds, Traylor Howard and Richard Ruccolo. In 1997 Westfeldt co-wrote and co-starred with Heather Juergensen in a six-night-engagement Off-Broadway play based on a series of sketches called Lipschtick: The Story of Two Women Seeking The Perfect Shade, which caught the attention of major Hollywood studios. The play was optioned by Interscope Communications to be made into a film, but after two years, Interscope's option expired in 1999, Westfeldt and Juergensen decided to make the film independently.

Kissing Jessica Stein debuted at the LA International Film Festival in 2001, where it won the Audience Award for Best Feature, and a Special Jury Award for Writing and Acting for Westfeldt and Juergensen. The film was released by Fox Searchlight Pictures in March 2002. Westfeldt received the Golden Satellite Award for Best Actress in a Musical or Comedy for her role as Jessica, and an Indie Spirit Nomination for Best First Screenplay. The film won the Audience Favorites Award at the Chicago International Film Festival, the Audience Award at the Miami Film Festival, Best Feature at the Louisville Jewish Film Festival, and the GLAAD Media Award, and it was included on more than a dozen top ten lists in 2002. Variety wrote, "A fresh take on sex and the single girl, this buoyant, well-crafted romantic comedy blends pitch-perfect performances with deliciously smart writing." In Newsweek David Ansen said the film "knows what it wants, what its limits are, and delivers its delights accordingly." In 2014, The Advocate listed the movie as an essential film for LGBTQ+ viewers that "encourages exploration and self-awareness." In 2020, Kveller writer Mara Reinstein looked back on the impact that this "authentic" and "nuanced" movie had, writing, "I can't overstate how much Kissing Jessica Stein pioneered the gay rom-com."

Westfeldt made her Broadway debut in the fall of 2003 in the critical and commercial hit Wonderful Town, starring opposite two-time Tony winner Donna Murphy and directed by three-time Tony winner Kathleen Marshall. Westfeldt received a 2004 Tony nomination, a Theater World Award for Outstanding Broadway Debut, and a Drama League Award for her role as Eileen Sherwood. Of her Broadway debut, John Simon of New York magazine wrote: "Jennifer Westfeldt leaps onto the Broadway stage in full-fledged acting and singing splendor as the adorable Eileen." Ben Brantley of the New York Times wrote, "Jennifer Westfeldt makes a charming Broadway debut as Eileen, Ruth's boy-magnet of a sister." "Ms. Westfeldt's delightfully un-self-conscious interpretation suggests a virginal answer to the Vargas pinup girls," he added.

=== 2006–2011: Acting work and directorial debut ===
Westfeldt's next feature, Ira & Abby, marked her first solo screenwriting effort. The film debuted at the Los Angeles Film Festival in 2006, where it won the Audience Award for Best Feature. It was acquired by Magnolia Pictures and released in the fall of 2007 to strong reviews. Westfeldt won Best Actress at the HBO U.S. Comedy Arts Festival in Aspen in 2006 for her performance as Abby, where Ira & Abby also took home the Jury Prize for Best Feature. The film won Audience Award for Best Feature at the Boston Jewish Film Festival.

After one season on Two Guys, a Girl and a Pizza Place, 20th Century Fox Studios cast Westfeldt as the lead of another series, the short-lived Holding the Baby on Fox. She went on to star in multiple pilots, including the WB's The Gene Pool opposite Chris Eigeman; The Untitled Paul Reiser Pilot on F/X; and Steve Levitan's Dante on NBC, opposite Morris Chestnut and Kevin Hart. In 2002, Westfeldt, along with her journalist sister Amy, sold a one-hour newsroom drama pitch to Touchstone/ABC; Westfeldt was attached to star. Called The Independent, the series was loosely inspired by her sister's experiences as a career journalist at the Associated Press. In 2006, she was cast as the female lead in ABC's Notes from the Underbelly, which ran for two seasons. Andrew Johnston wrote in TimeOut: "Jennifer Westfeldt is a total babe, with physical-comedy skills that, if properly honed, could approach Lucille Ball territory. In other words, she was basically born for TV. [Westfeldt] gets to show her serious side, too, and if the series gives her enough exposure to start competing with Hope Davis and Laura Linney for blond-WASP roles, Underbelly will have more than justified its existence." In 2010, with Alan Ball attached as executive producer, she sold a TV dramedy to HBO with her attached to star about the bird's nest custody agreement in divorce cases.

In 2011, Westfeldt wrote, produced, starred in, and made her directorial debut in Friends with Kids, which was a breakout hit at the 2011 Toronto International Film Festival. Lionsgate and Roadside Attractions obtained the rights to the film, and it was released in 2012. Westfeldt starred opposite Adam Scott, with a cast including Maya Rudolph, Kristen Wiig, Chris O'Dowd, Ed Burns, Megan Fox and Jon Hamm. Peter Travers of Rolling Stone called Friends with Kids "an indelibly funny and touching comedy with a real sting in its tail," and deemed Westfeldt "an actress of rare wit and grace, and now a filmmaker with a keen eye for nuance. In front of the camera and behind it, she's the live current that pulls us in and makes us care. Westfeldt is the pulse of Friends With Kids, presenting us with life in all of its vibrant, messy sprawl." The film was included on New York Magazine's Top Ten Movies of 2012 list, as well as NPR's Top 12 of 2012.

=== 2012–present ===
Her varied TV credits include memorable arcs on Younger, Queen America (opposite Catherine Zeta-Jones), Grey's Anatomy, 24, Judging Amy, and Hack; and guest-starring turns on NBC's hit drama This Is Us, HBO's Girls, and Childrens Hospital, among others. She provided the voice of Kit Luntayne in the Martha Speaks episodes "Cora! Cora! Cora!" and "Cora Encore!" on PBS.

Westfeldt's other stage work includes the world premieres of Scott Z. Burns' The Library at The Public Theater opposite Chloe Grace-Moretz, directed by Steven Soderbergh; Nell Benjamin’s The Explorers Club at Manhattan Theater Club, directed by Marc Bruni; Nicky Silver's Too Much Sun at The Vineyard Theater opposite Linda Lavin, directed by Mark Brokaw; Cusi Cram's A Lifetime Burning at Primary Stages, directed by Pam MacKinnon; Joe Gilford’s Finks opposite Josh Radnor at The Powerhouse Theater/NYSAF, directed by Charlie Stratton; Stephen Belber's The Power of Duff opposite Greg Kinnear at The Powerhouse Theater/NYSAF, directed by Peter Dubois; and Alexandra Gersten-Vassilaros' Big Sky at The Geffen opposite Jon Tenney, directed by John Rando. In 2022 she received glowing reviews from the New York Times for her performance as Mama in Liba Vaynberg' s play The Gett.

Other film roles include the 2016 short Lemon opposite Noah Bean, which premiered at the 2016 Tribeca Film Festival and, in 2017, a supporting role in director Marielle Heller’s Can You Ever Forgive Me? opposite Melissa McCarthy, which later ended up on the cutting room floor. In 2017, Westfeldt produced the documentary Circus Kid, based on Lorenzo Pisoni's life growing up in a circus family, which was bought and distributed by Sundance Now. In 2022 she wrote several episodes of the Showtime series The First Lady.

Westfeldt sold to Amazon The Idea of You, an adapted screenplay based on the novel of the same name by Robinne Lee starring Anne Hathaway. The film completed shooting in December 2022 and was released in May 2024. With a self-reported 50 million viewers in the first two weeks it was Amazon MGM’s No. 1 romantic-comedy debut of all time, according to the studio. She is currently working on a film adaptation of Amy Poeppel's novel The Sweet Spot.

== Personal life ==
Westfeldt was in a long-term relationship with actor Jon Hamm from 1997 to 2015.

== Filmography ==
=== Film ===
Year	Title	Role	Notes
2001	See Jane Run	Unknown	Film debut
2001	Kissing Jessica Stein	Jessica Stein	Also co-producer and writer
2004	How to Lose Your Lover	Val	
2005	Keep Your Distance	Melody Carpenter	
2006	Ira & Abby	Abby Willoughby	Also executive producer and writer
2011	Friends with Kids	Julie Keller	Also director, producer and writer
2016	10 Crosby	Elegant Woman	Short film
2016	Lemon	Penelope	Short film
2017	Circus Kid	—N/a	Documentary; producer only
2018	Can You Ever Forgive Me?	Ms. Whitman	Deleted scenes
2023	Parachute	Lisa	
2024	The Idea of You	—N/a	Writer only

=== Television ===
Year	Title	Role	Notes	Ref.
1998	Two Guys, a Girl and a Pizza Place	Melissa	Series regular (13 episodes)	
1998	Holding the Baby	Kelly O'Malley	Series regular (13 episodes)	
1999	Snoops	Irene Hollis	Episode: "Separation Anxiety"	
2000	Judging Amy	Leisha Eldon	3 episodes	
2001	The Gene Pool	Jane Anderson	Television movie	
2003	Hack	Emily Carson	2 episodes	
2003	Untitled New York Pilot	Catherine	Television movie	
2005	Numb3rs	Dr. Karen Fisher	Episode: "Man Hunt"	
2005	Dante	Unknown	Television movie	
2007	Wainy Days	Nora	Episode: "Dorvid Days"	
2007–2008	Notes from the Underbelly	Lauren Stone	Series regular (23 episodes)	
2009	Private Practice	Jen Harmon	Episode: "Ex-Life"	
2009	Before You Say 'I Do'	Jane Gardner	Television movie	
2009	Grey's Anatomy	Jen Harmon	3 episodes	
2010	24	Meredith Reed	Recurring role (6 episodes)	
2012	Martha Speaks	Kit (voice role)	Episode: "Cora! Cora!/Cora Encore!"	
2012	Childrens Hospital	Jessica Meetcher	Episode: "Behind the Scenes"	
2014	Girls	Annalise Pressler-Goings	Episode: "Only Child"	
2017–2021	Younger	Pauline Turner-Brooks	Recurring role (13 episodes)	
2018	Queen America	Mandi Green	Recurring role (3 episodes)	
2019	Mad About You	Donna Lawson	Episode: "Real Estate for Beginners"	
2020	This Is Us	Claire	Episode: "A Hell of a Week: Part Two"	
2022	The First Lady	—N/a	Writer only; 4 episodes	

=== Theater ===
Year	Title	Role	Venue
2003–2004	Wonderful Town	Eileen Sherwood	Al Hirschfeld Theatre
2008	Finks	Natalie Meltzer	The Powerhouse Theater/NYSAF
2009	A Lifetime Burning	Emma	Primary Stages
2011	Three Sisters	Masha	LA Theaterworks
2012	The Power of Duff	Sue	The Powerhouse Theater
2013	The Explorers Club	Phyllida Spot-Hume	Manhattan Theater Club
2014	Too Much Sun	Kitty	The Vineyard Theater
2014	The Library	Elizabeth Gabriel	The Public Theater
2016	Big Sky	Jen	The Geffen
2016	The Money Shot	Karen	LA Theaterworks
2022	The Gett	Mama	Rattlestick Theater
2025	The Assembled Parties	Julie	Hampstead Theatre

== Awards and nominations ==
Year	Association	Category	Work	Result	Ref.
2003	Golden Satellite Award	Best Actress in a Musical or Comedy	Kissing Jessica Stein	Won	
2003	Independent Spirit Awards	Best First Screenplay	Kissing Jessica Stein	Nominated	
2003	Los Angeles International Film Festival	Special Jury Prize for Writing and Acting	Kissing Jessica Stein	Won	
2004	Tony Awards	Featured Actress in a Musical	Wonderful Town	Nominated	
2004	Theater World Award	Outstanding Broadway Debut	Wonderful Town	Won	
2004	Drama League Award		Wonderful Town	Won	
2007	HBO U.S. Comedy Arts Festival	Best Actress	Ira & Abby	Won	
