= Scott Cooper (director) =

American actor and filmmaker (born 1970)

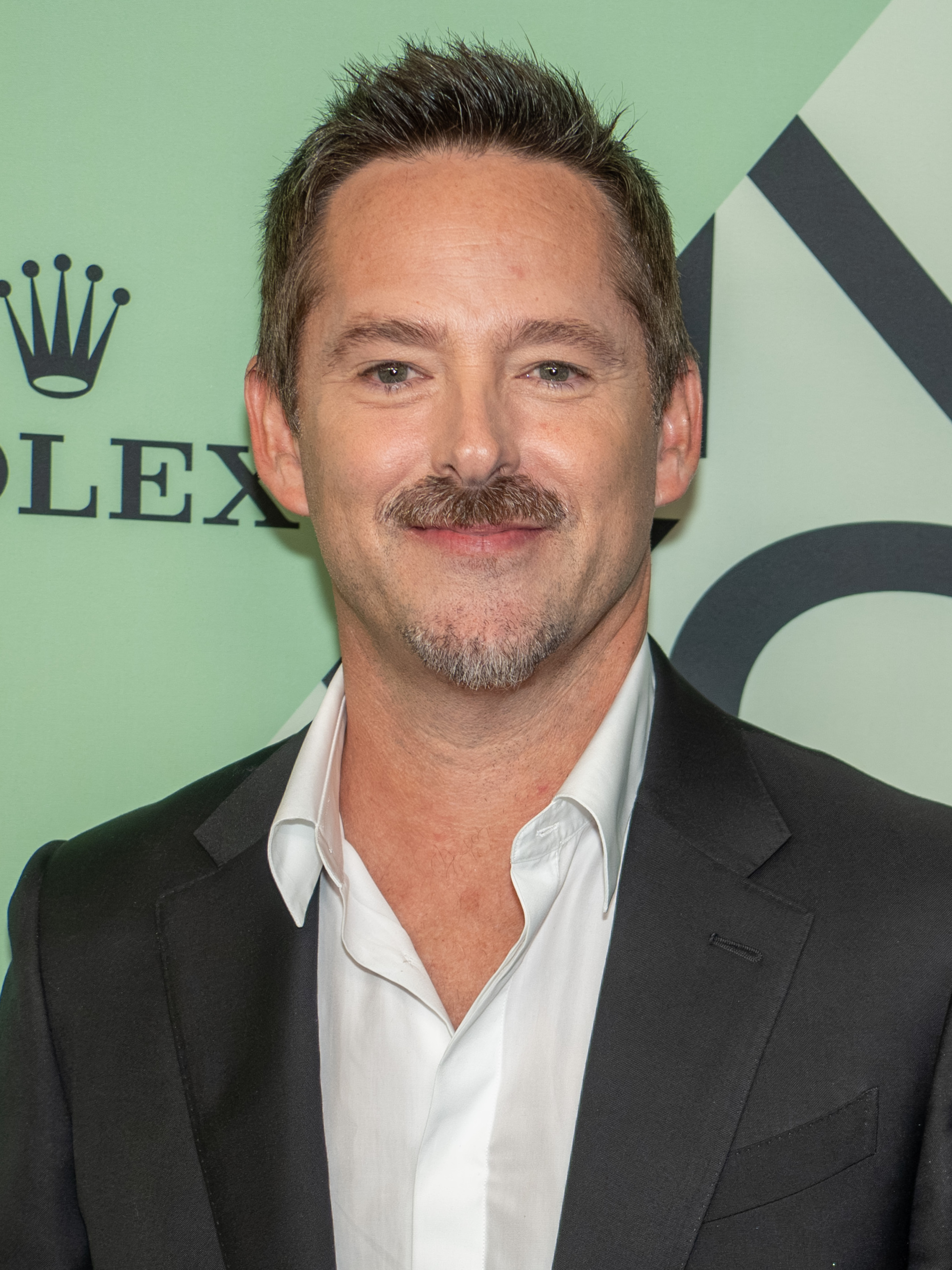
- Cooper in 2025
- Born: April 20, 1970 (age 56); Abingdon, Virginia, U.S.
- Education: Hampden–Sydney College
- Occupations: Actor, filmmaker
- Years active: 1998–present
- Relatives: Todd Cooper (brother)

Scott Cooper (born April 20, 1970) is an American filmmaker and former actor. He is known for the films Crazy Heart (2009), Out of the Furnace (2013), Black Mass (2015), Hostiles (2017), Antlers (2021), The Pale Blue Eye (2022), and Springsteen: Deliver Me from Nowhere (2025).

== Early life ==
Cooper was born in Abingdon, Virginia. He is a 1988 graduate of Abingdon High School. Cooper trained as an actor at Lee Strasberg Theatre and Film Institute in New York City. He received both his undergraduate degree in 1992 and his Doctor of Humane Letters in 2014 from Hampden–Sydney College in Hampden Sydney, Virginia.

== Career ==
Cooper spent a decade working as an actor in film and television.

He made the switch to directing with 2009's Crazy Heart, starring Jeff Bridges and Maggie Gyllenhaal. The film, released by Fox Searchlight Pictures, received widespread critical acclaim and a number of accolades, including the Academy Awards for Best Actor (Bridges) and Best Original Song.

Among Crazy Heart's fans were director Ridley Scott and producer Michael Costigan, as well as executives at Leonardo DiCaprio's production company, Appian Way. Cooper was offered the opportunity to develop The Low Dweller, a spec script written by Brad Ingelsby that had DiCaprio and Scott attached, as actor and director respectively. Cooper rewrote the script, drawing on his experience of growing up in Appalachia and losing a sibling at a young age.

Relativity Media put the film, now titled Out of the Furnace, into production in 2012, with Christian Bale, Woody Harrelson and Casey Affleck leading the ensemble cast. Cooper directed the film, and shared writing credit with Ingelsby. DiCaprio and Scott remained as producers.

In January 2014, Cooper became attached to rewrite and direct Black Mass, a crime drama based the book of the same name by Dick Lehr and Gerard O'Neill, described as the "true story of Billy Bulger, Whitey Bulger, FBI agent John Connolly and the FBI's witness protection program that was created by J. Edgar Hoover." Barry Levinson had previously been involved with the project. Johnny Depp, who had been on and off the project for a number of years, came back on board to play the infamous Boston crime boss Whitey Bulger, alongside Joel Edgerton as Connolly and Benedict Cumberbatch as Billy Bulger. The film was released in 2015. In 2016, he sold his home in Brentwood for $3.6 million and it was widely covered in the media.

Cooper wrote, directed and produced the 2017 western Hostiles, based on a decades old manuscript by the late screenwriter Donald E. Stewart. The film reteamed Cooper with his Out of the Furnace star, Bale, alongside Rosamund Pike. It had its world premiere at the Telluride Film Festival, with US distribution rights picked up by Entertainment Studios Motion Pictures. Critics praised the film's performances and visual storytelling. The Hollywood Reporter highlighted Bale's "commanding performance" and Cooper's "painterly eye for landscapes," and Miami New Times noted that Scott Cooper "has specialized in thoughtful, actor-driven, for-adults Hollywood genre fare." Cooper's next film was the supernatural horror story Antlers, starring Keri Russell and Jesse Plemons and co-produced by Guillermo del Toro, which was released in 2021.

In January 2024 it was announced that Cooper would be writing and directing a film based on the making of Bruce Springsteen's 1982 album Nebraska. The film, titled Springsteen: Deliver Me from Nowhere, was based on the 2023 book written by Warren Zanes, with the involvement of Springsteen and his manager Jon Landau.

In January 2026, it was announced that Cooper would write and direct a thriller based on the Roswell, New Mexico incident for 20th Century Studios, reuniting with Springsteen: Deliver Me from Nowhere producers Eric Robinson and Ellen Goldsmith-Vein of Gotham Group.

== Influences ==
Thomas Wolfe and William Faulkner are literary influences.

Films that have influenced Cooper include: Robert Altman's Nashville, Terrence Malick's Badlands, John Huston's Fat City and Peter Bogdanovich's The Last Picture Show.

His principal film-making mentor has been veteran actor, producer and director, Robert Duvall. He and Duvall met on the set of Gods and Generals and struck up a friendship. Cooper was married on Duvall's 300-acre (1.2 km^{2}) Virginia estate. The two appeared together in Broken Trail and Get Low, and Duvall produced and appeared in Cooper's film Crazy Heart, along with an appearance in The Pale Blue Eye.

== Filmography ==
Year	Title	Director	Writer	Producer
2009	For Sale by Owner	No	Yes	Co-producer
2009	Crazy Heart	Yes	Yes	Yes
2013	Out of the Furnace	Yes	Yes	No
2015	Black Mass	Yes	No	Yes
2017	Hostiles	Yes	Yes	Yes
2021	Antlers	Yes	Yes	No
2022	The Pale Blue Eye	Yes	Yes	Yes
2025	Springsteen: Deliver Me from Nowhere	Yes	Yes	Yes
TBA	Time Out	Yes	Yes	Yes

=== Acting roles ===
Film

Year	Title	Role	Notes
1998	Dry Martini	Robert	
1999	Perfect Fit	Guy in bar	
1999	Austin Powers: The Spy Who Shagged Me	Klansman's Son – Bobby	
2000	Takedown	Jake Cronin	Also known as Hackers 2: Takedown
2001	Bill's Gun Shop	Dillion McCarthy	
2001	Rain	Pvt. Holland	
2003	Gods and Generals	Lt. Joseph Morrison	
2003	Save It for Later	Jake O'Connor	Also known as Water Under the Bridge
2003	Attitude	Rails	
2009	For Sale by Owner	Will Custis	
2009	Get Low	Carl	

Television

Year	Title	Role	Notes
1999	The X-Files	Max Harden	Episode: "Rush"
2001	The District	Michael Barrett	Episode: "Lost and Found"
2006	Broken Trail	Gilpin	Miniseries

== Recurring collaborators ==
Work Actor	2009	2013	2015	2017	2021	2022	2025	TBA	—N/a
Work Actor	Crazy Heart	Out of the Furnace	Black Mass	Hostiles	Antlers	The Pale Blue Eye	Springsteen: Deliver Me from Nowhere	Time Out	Total
Tom Bower†									2
Ryan Bingham									2
Robert Duvall †									2
Dicky Eklund, Jr.									3
Mark Falvo									2
Christian Bale									3
Dendrie Taylor									2
Rory Cochrane									3
Jesse Plemons									3
Scott Anderson									2
Bill Camp									2
Ava Cooper									2
Stella Cooper									2
Jeremy Strong									2
Willem Dafoe									2

== Awards and nominations ==
- Nominated for Most Promising Director for Crazy Heart at CFCA Award 2009
- Nominated for Best Screenplay for Crazy Heart at 2010 Independent Spirit Awards
- Nominated for Best Screenplay for Crazy Heart at 2010 Writers Guild of America Awards
- Nominated for Best Director for Springsteen: Deliver Me from Nowhere at 2025 AARP Movies for Grownups Awards
