= Jonah Hill filmography =

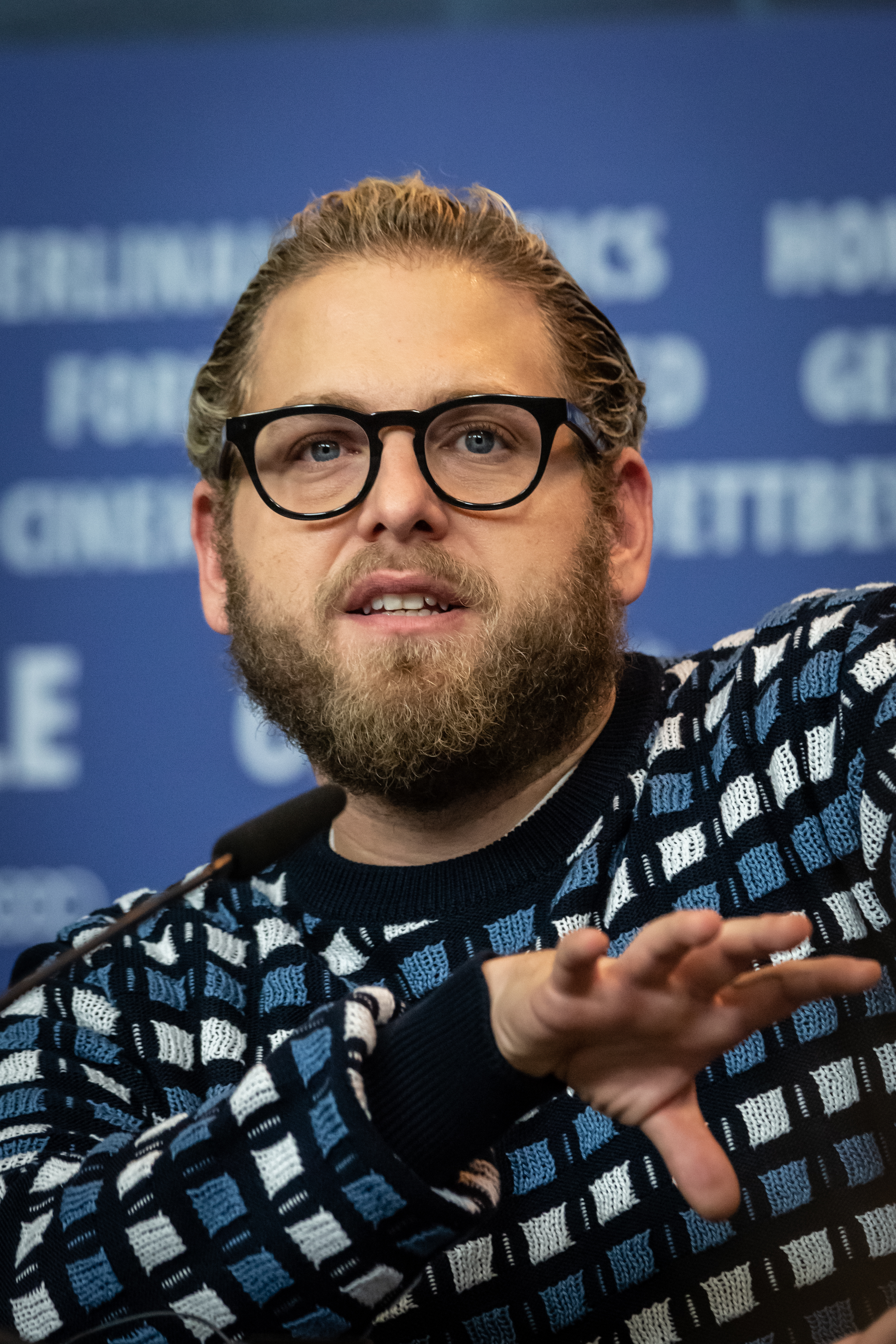
Hill at Berlinale in 2019

American actor Jonah Hill is best known for his comedic roles in I Heart Huckabees (2004), The 40-Year-Old Virgin (2005), Accepted (2006), Knocked Up (2007), Superbad (2007), Forgetting Sarah Marshall (2008), Get Him to the Greek (2010), 21 Jump Street (2012), its 2014 sequel as well as This Is the End (2013). He is also known for his critically acclaimed performances in the independent dramedy Cyrus (2010), Bennett Miller's Moneyball (2011), Quentin Tarantino's western Django Unchained (2012), Martin Scorsese's crime film The Wolf of Wall Street (2013), the Coen Brothers comedy Hail, Caesar! (2016), and Gus Van Sant's Don't Worry, He Won't Get Far on Foot (2018).

As a director, he made his feature debut with Mid90s (2018), followed by the Netflix documentary Stutz (2022) and the black comedy film Outcome (2026) for Apple TV+.

He has received two Academy Award nominations for Best Supporting Actor for his work in Moneyball (2011) and The Wolf of Wall Street (2013).

== Film ==
Year	Title	Role	Notes
2004	I Heart Huckabees	Bret	
2005	The 40-Year-Old Virgin	eBay Customer	
2006	Grandma's Boy	Barry	
2006	Click	Ben Newman at 17 Years Old	
2006	Accepted	Sherman Schrader	
2006	10 Items or Less	Packy	
2007	Rocket Science	Junior Philosopher	
2007	Knocked Up	Jonah	
2007	Evan Almighty	Eugene "Gene" Tannenbaum	
2007	Superbad	Seth	
2007	Walk Hard: The Dewey Cox Story	Older Nate Cox	Uncredited
2007	HJ Train	Slick Rubin	Short film; also director, writer and producer
2008	Strange Wilderness	Cooker	
2008	Horton Hears a Who!	Tommy	Voice
2008	Forgetting Sarah Marshall	Matthew Van Der Wyk	
2008	Just Add Water	Eddie Tuckby	
2009	Night at the Museum: Battle of the Smithsonian	"Brundon"	Uncredited
2009	Brüno	—N/a	Associate producer
2009	Funny People	Leo Koenig	
2009	The Invention of Lying	Frank	
2010	Cyrus	Cyrus	
2010	How to Train Your Dragon	Snotlout Jorgenson	Voice
2010	Get Him to the Greek	Aaron Green	
2010	Megamind	Hal Stewart / Tighten	Voice
2010	Legend of the Boneknapper Dragon	Snotlout Jorgenson	Voice; Short film
2011	Moneyball	Peter Brand	
2011	Gift of the Night Fury	Snotlout Jorgenson	Voice; Short film
2011	The Sitter	Noah Scott Griffith	Also executive producer
2012	21 Jump Street	Morton Schmidt	Also story writer and executive producer
2012	The Watch	Franklin	
2012	Django Unchained	Bag Head No. 2	Cameo
2013	This Is the End	Himself	
2013	The Wolf of Wall Street	Donnie Azoff	
2014	The Lego Movie	Green Lantern / Hal Jordan	Voice
2014	How to Train Your Dragon 2	Snotlout Jorgenson	Voice
2014	22 Jump Street	Morton Schmidt	Also story writer and producer
2015	True Story	Michael Finkel	
2016	Hail, Caesar!	Joseph Silverman	
2016	Sausage Party	Carl	Voice; also story writer and executive producer
2016	War Dogs	Efraim Diveroli	
2016	Why Him?	—N/a	Story writer and producer
2017	The Lego Batman Movie	Green Lantern / Hal Jordan	Voice Cameo
2017	Batman Is Just Not That Into You	Green Lantern / Hal Jordan	Voice, short film
2018	Don't Worry, He Won't Get Far on Foot	Donnie Green	
2018	Mid90s	—N/a	Director, writer, and producer
2019	How to Train Your Dragon: The Hidden World	Snotlout Jorgenson	Voice
2019	The Lego Movie 2: The Second Part	Green Lantern / Hal Jordan	Voice
2019	The Beach Bum	Lewis	
2019	Richard Jewell	—N/a	Producer
2021	Don't Look Up	Jason Orlean	
2022	Stutz	Himself	Documentary; also director and producer
2022	This Place Rules	—N/a	Producer
2023	You People	Ezra Cohen	Also co-writer and producer
2024	Y2K	—N/a	Producer
2026	Outcome	Ira Slitz	Also director, co-writer and producer
TBA	Cut Off	Ashton Bismol	Post-production; also director, co-writer and producer

== Television ==
Year	Title	Role	Notes
2004	NYPD Blue	Clerk	Episode: "You're Buggin' Me"
2005	Punk'd	Himself	Episode dated: "December 11, 2005"
2006	Campus Ladies	Guy	7 episodes
2007	Human Giant	Weenie King Customer	Episode: "Ta Da"
2007	Clark and Michael	Derek	Episode: "1.8"
2007	Wainy Days	Neil	2 episodes
2008–2018	Saturday Night Live	Himself / Host	5 episodes
2008	Sesame Street	Himself	Episode: "Elmo wants to be like Gordon"
2009	Tim and Eric Awesome Show, Great Job!	John A. Hill	Episode: "Road Trip"
2009	Reno 911!	Daniel Shaheen	Episode: "Training Day"
2009	The Simpsons	Andy Hamilton (voice)	Episode: "Pranks and Greens"
2011	Allen Gregory	Allen Gregory / Guillermo (voices)	7 episodes; also co-creator, writer and executive producer
2013	Comedy Central Roast of James Franco	Himself / Roaster	TV special
2014	Sesame Street	Himself	Episode: "Big Bird loses his Nest"
2017	Animals.	The President (voice)	Episode: "Humans"
2018	Maniac	Owen Milgrim	10 episodes; also executive producer
2018	The Shivering Truth	Suicidal Man (voice)	Episode: "Chaos Beknownst"
2020	Curb Your Enthusiasm	Himself	Episode: "The Spite Store"
2022	Winning Time: The Rise of the Lakers Dynasty	—N/a	Director; Episode: "Is That All There Is?"
2024–present	Sausage Party: Foodtopia	—N/a	Executive producer
2025–present	Overcompensating	—N/a	Executive producer
2025–present	The Mortician	—N/a	Executive producer

== Video games ==
Year	Title	Role
2010	Megamind: Mega Team Unite	Tighten (voice)

== Music videos ==
Year	Title	Artist	Notes
2011	"Gonna Get Over You"	Sara Bareilles	Director
2017	"Ain't It Funny"	Danny Brown	Director
2019	"Sunflower"	Vampire Weekend	Director
2019	"Wake Up"	Travis Scott	Director

== See also ==
- List of awards and nominations received by Jonah Hill
