= List of awards and nominations received by Jonah Hill =

Jonah Hill awards and nominations
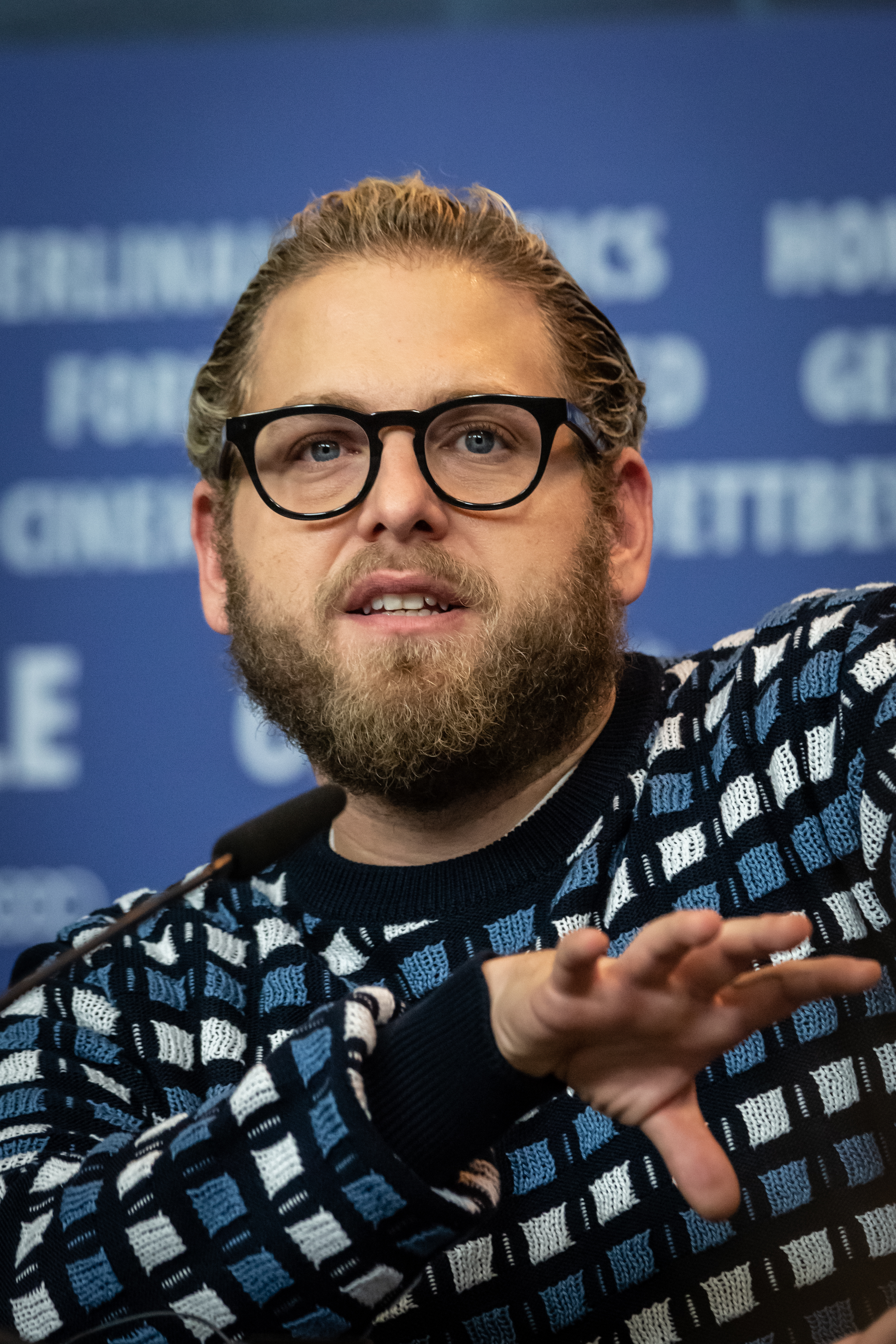
- Hill at Berlinale in 2019
Awards and nominations
Award	Wins	Nominations
Actor Award	0	2
Academy Awards	0	2
BAFTA Awards	0	1
Golden Globe Awards	0	2

Totals (Note: Certain award groups do not simply award one winner. They acknowledge several different recipients, have runners-up, and have third place. Since this is a specific recognition and is different from losing an award, runner-up mentions are considered wins in this award tally. For simplification and to avoid errors, each award in this list has been presumed to have had a prior nomination.)
- Wins: 5
- Nominations: 44

The following is a list of awards and nominations received by Jonah Hill.

Jonah Hill is an American actor and filmmaker. Known for his comedic and dramatic roles, he has received an MTV Movie Award, a Teen Choice Award and two prizes from the Palm Springs International Film Festival as well as nominations for two Actor Awards, two Academy Awards, a BAFTA Award, a prize from the Berlin International Film Festival and two Golden Globe Awards.

Hill took early comedic roles in The 40-Year-Old Virgin (2005), Accepted (2006), and Knocked Up (2007), before starring as an immature teenager in the Greg Mottola directed the teen comedy Superbad (2007) for which he was nominated for the MTV Movie Award for Best Breakthrough Performance, the MTV Movie Award for Best Comedic Performance and the Teen Choice Award for Choice Movie Actor – Comedy. He expanded his career in comedy starring as an undercover agent playing a high schooler and college student respectively in the action comedy films 21 Jump Street (2012), 22 Jump Street (2014) for which he was nominated for the three MTV Movie Awards and six Teen Choice Awards. He also played a fictionalized version of himself in the end of the world comedy This Is the End (2013) earning an American Comedy Award nomination.

He portrayed Paul Brand in Bennett Miller's sports drama Moneyball (2011) for which he earned nominations for the Academy Award, Actor Award, BAFTA Award, and Golden Globe Award for Best Supporting Actor. The following year he took a minor role in the Quentin Tarantino western epic Django Unchained (2012). He then portrayed Donny Azoff in Martin Scorsese's crime satire The Wolf of Wall Street (2013) for which he earned nominated for the Academy Award for Best Supporting Actor. He played Efraim Diveroli in the dark comedy crime thriller War Dogs (2016) for which he was nominated for the Golden Globe Award for Best Actor in a Motion Picture – Musical or Comedy. He played the sarcastic son of an unruly President in the Don't Look Up (2021) for which he was nominated for the Actor Award for Outstanding Cast in a Motion Picture.

Hill made his feature film debut as a director with the semi-autobiographical coming-of-age skateboarding dramedy Mid90s (2018) which competed for prizes at both the Berlin International Film Festival and the Jerusalem Film Festival. On television, Hill acted in and produced the Netflix psychological black comedy drama series Maniac (2018) for which he was nominated for the Producers Guild of America Award for Best Limited Series Television. He also served as an executive producer for the Amazon Prime Video college romance comedy series Overcompensating (2025–present) for which he was nominated for the Gotham TV Award for Breakthrough Comedy Series.

== Major associations ==
=== Academy Awards ===
Year	Category	Nominated work	Result	Ref.
2012	Best Supporting Actor	Moneyball	Nominated	
2014	Best Supporting Actor	The Wolf of Wall Street	Nominated	

=== Actor Awards ===
Year	Category	Nominated work	Result	Ref.
2012	Outstanding Actor in a Supporting Role	Moneyball	Nominated	
2022	Outstanding Ensemble Cast in a Motion Picture	Don't Look Up	Nominated	

=== British Academy Film Awards ===
Year	Category	Nominated work	Result	Ref.
2012	Best Actor in a Supporting Role	Moneyball	Nominated	

=== Golden Globe Awards ===
Year	Category	Nominated work	Result	Ref.
2012	Best Supporting Actor – Motion Picture	Moneyball	Nominated	
2017	Best Actor – Motion Picture Musical or Comedy	War Dogs	Nominated	

== Critics awards ==
Award	Year	Category	Work	Result	Ref.
Dallas–Fort Worth Film Critics Awards	2013	Best Supporting Actor	The Wolf of Wall Street	Nominated	
Iowa Film Critics Awards	2012	Best Supporting Actor	Moneyball	Nominated	
San Diego Film Critics Society Awards	2012	Best Ensemble Performance	Django Unchained	Nominated	
Saint Louis Gateway Film Critics Awards	2011	Best Supporting Actor	Moneyball	Nominated	

== Miscellaneous awards ==
Award	Year	Category	Work	Result	Ref.
Awards Circuit Community Awards	2011	Best Actor in a Supporting Role	Moneyball	Nominated	
Awards Circuit Community Awards	2013	Best Actor in a Supporting Role	The Wolf of Wall Street	Nominated	
American Comedy Award	2013	Best Comedy Supporting Actor - Film	This is the End	Nominated	
Berlin International Film Festival	2019	C.I.C.A.E Award	Mid90s	Nominated	
Gotham TV Awards	2025	Breakthrough Comedy Series	Overcompensating	Nominated	
Gold Derby Awards	2014	Best Supporting Actor	The Wolf of Wall Street	Nominated	
Gold Derby Awards	2014	Best Ensemble Cast	The Wolf of Wall Street	Nominated	
Gold Derby Awards	2022	Best Ensemble Cast	Don't Look Up	Nominated	
MTV Movie Awards	2008	Best Breakthrough Performance	Superbad	Nominated	
MTV Movie Awards	2008	Best Comedic Performance	Superbad	Nominated	
MTV Movie Awards	2012	Best Comedic Performance	21 Jump Street	Nominated	
MTV Movie Awards	2012	Best Gut-Wrenching Performance (Note: Shared with Rob Riggle.)	21 Jump Street	Nominated	
MTV Movie Awards	2012	Best Fight (Note: Shared with Channing Tatum.)	21 Jump Street	Nominated	
MTV Movie Awards	2012	Best Cast (Note: Shared with Channing Tatum, Ice Cube, Dave Franco, Ellie Kemper, Brie Larson and Rob Riggle.)	21 Jump Street	Nominated	
MTV Movie Awards	2014	Best On-Screen Duo (Note: Shared with Leonardo DiCaprio.)	The Wolf of Wall Street	Nominated	
MTV Movie Awards	2014	Best Comedic Performance	The Wolf of Wall Street	Won	
Palm Springs International Film Festival	2014	Creative Impact in Acting	Moneyball	Won	
Palm Springs International Film Festival	2014	Creative Impact in Acting	The Wolf of Wall Street	Won	
Producers Guild of America Awards	2018	Best Limited Series Television	Maniac	Nominated	
Satellite Awards	2011	Best Supporting Actor – Motion Picture	Moneyball	Nominated	
Teen Choice Awards	2007	Choice Movie: Scream Scene	Accepted	Nominated	
Teen Choice Awards	2008	Choice Comedian	Jonah Hill	Nominated	
Teen Choice Awards	2008	Choice Movie Actor: Comedy	Superbad	Nominated	
Teen Choice Awards	2010	Choice Movie Actor: Comedy	Get Him to the Greek	Nominated	
Teen Choice Awards	2010	Choice Movie: Liplock (Note: Shared with Russell Brand.)	Get Him to the Greek	Nominated	
Teen Choice Awards	2010	Choice Movie: Fight (Note: Shared with Russell Brand and Sean Combs.)	Get Him to the Greek	Nominated	
Teen Choice Awards	2012	Choice Movie Actor: Comedy	21 Jump Street	Nominated	
Teen Choice Awards	2012	Choice Movie: Chemistry	21 Jump Street	Nominated	
Teen Choice Awards	2012	Choice Movie: Hissy Fit	21 Jump Street	Nominated	
Teen Choice Awards	2014	Choice Movie: Chemistry	22 Jump Street	Nominated	
Teen Choice Awards	2014	Choice Movie: Hissy Fit	22 Jump Street	Won	
Teen Choice Awards	2014	Choice Summer Movie Star	22 Jump Street	Nominated	
Young Hollywood Awards	2014	Fan Favorite Actor – Male	Jonah Hill	Nominated	
Young Hollywood Awards	2014	Best Bromance	Jonah Hill	Won	
