= Guy Lawson =

Canadian journalist (born 1963)

- Born: Guy Lawson; June 14, 1963 (age 63); Toronto, Ontario, Canada
- Occupations: Writer, journalist
- Spouse: Maya Kaimal (m. 2001)
- Children: 2
- Writing career
- Period: 1993 - present
- Genre: Nonfiction
- Subject: True crime
- Notable works: Arms and the Dudes; Octopus: Sam Israel, the Secret Market, and Wall Street's Wildest Con
- Website: www.guylawson.com

Guy Lawson (born June 14, 1963) is a Canadian journalist and true crime writer who has been published in Harper's, GQ, the New York Times, and Rolling Stone.

== Early life and career ==
Lawson was born in Toronto, Canada to expatriate Australian and Kiwi parents. After his parents divorced, he lived with his mother for a period of time before moving to Saskatchewan to rejoin his father, a journalist and writer, and then to Perth, Western Australia in 1981. He attended the University of Western Australia, before studying law at the University of Cambridge, England. He briefly worked as an attorney on Wall Street in New York City in the 1990s before transitioning to journalism.

== Journalism ==
Lawson's first journalism job came as the host of the Canadian literary talk show Imprint in 1993. His first print feature story was in the field of politics, when he was assigned to cover the 1995 the Quebec referendum for Harper's magazine. From there, Lawson earned additional accolades and opportunities, starting with a breakthrough stories for Harper's about small-town Canadian hockey players and life in a flophouse on the Bowery in New York City.

Lawson has been published in numerous major publications throughout his career, covering war, sports, crime and many other subjects. In addition, one of his later works, Arms and the Dudes about the life and crimes of Efraim Diveroli and David Packouz, was adapted into the 2016 film War Dogs, which starred actors Jonah Hill, Miles Teller, Ana de Armas, and Bradley Cooper (who also executive produced the film). In addition to War Dogs, several of his other works have been optioned, including Octopus (about hedge fund trader and Ponzi scammer Sam Israel), by HBO, a GQ article called "The Knife" about LA gangs which was acquired by CBS, and a New York Times magazine feature on the first expedition to reach the North Pole, titled "Ice Pack" and in development with Sony.

== Personal life ==
Lawson lives with his wife, Maya Kaimal, an Indian food entrepreneur, whom he married in 2001. They have twin children and live in upstate New York. He is an avowed Toronto Maple Leafs fan, remaining loyal to one of his home province's hockey team despite residing in the United States.

== Bibliography ==
- The Brotherhoods: The True Story of Two Cops Who Murdered for the Mafia (2006)
- Octopus: Sam Israel, the Secret Market, and Wall Street's Wildest Con (2012)
- War Dogs: The True Story of How Three Stoners From Miami Beach Became the Most Unlikely Gunrunners in History (2016), also published under the title Arms and the Dudes.
- Hot Dog Money: Inside the Biggest Scandal in the History of College Sports (2024)

== Filmography ==
Year	Title	Role
2016	War Dogs	Writer (credited)/Producer
2004	Frontline	Consultant - 1 episode
2016	War Dogs: Access Granted	Self
2011	On the Trail of Easy Rider: 40 Years On... Still Searching for America	Self
1993-1995	Imprint	Host
