= Jonah Hill =

American actor (born 1983)

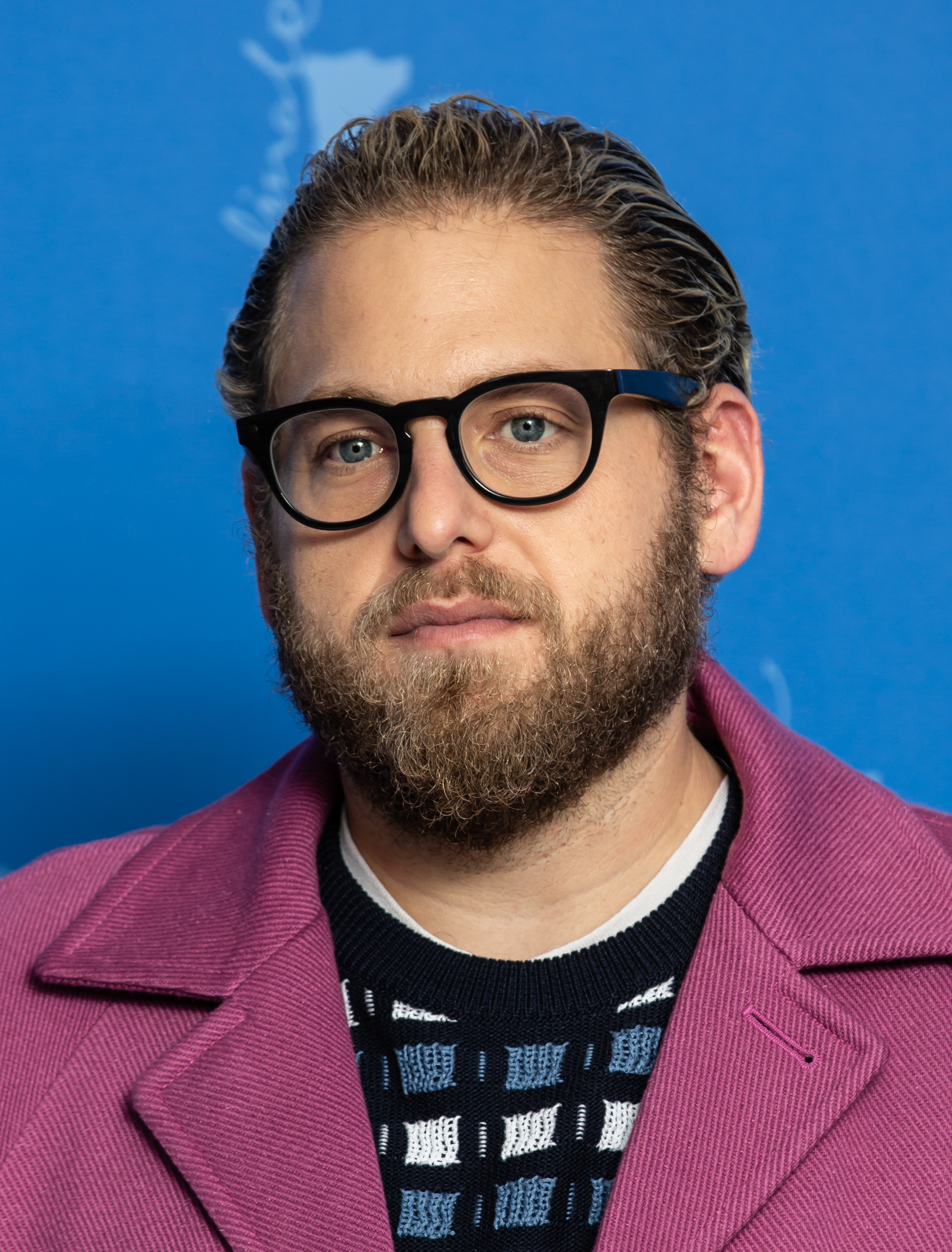
- Hill in 2019
- Born: Jonah Hill Feldstein; December 20, 1983 (age 42); Los Angeles, California, U.S.
- Occupations: Actor; filmmaker
- Years active: 2003–present
- Works: Full list
- Spouse: Olivia Millar (m. 2026)
- Children: 2
- Relatives: Beanie Feldstein (sister)
- Awards: Full list

Jonah Hill (born Jonah Hill Feldstein; December 20, 1983) is an American actor and filmmaker. Hill started his career as a comedic actor before transitioning to dramatic work and directing. Hill ranked 28th on Forbes's list of highest-paid actors from June 2014 to June 2015, at $16 million. Among his accolades are nominations for two Academy Awards, a BAFTA Award, and two Golden Globe Awards.

Hill has had a number of comedic roles in films including The 40-Year-Old Virgin (2005), Knocked Up (2007), Superbad (2007), Get Him to the Greek (2010), 21 Jump Street (2012), This Is the End (2013), and 22 Jump Street (2014). For his portrayals as Peter Brand in the sports drama Moneyball (2011) and Donnie Azoff in the crime dramedy The Wolf of Wall Street (2013), he was nominated for the Academy Award for Best Supporting Actor. He also had roles in Cyrus (2010), War Dogs (2016), Don't Worry, He Won't Get Far on Foot (2018), and Don't Look Up (2021).

Hill has voiced characters in the animated films Horton Hears a Who! (2008), the How to Train Your Dragon franchise (2010–2019), Megamind (2010), The Lego Movie franchise (2014–2019), and Sausage Party (2016). As a screenwriter, he contributed to the stories of 21 Jump Street, 22 Jump Street, Sausage Party, Why Him? (2016), and You People (2023). He starred in the Netflix miniseries Maniac (2018) and made his directorial debut with the film Mid90s (2018), for which he also wrote the screenplay. He directed and produced the documentary Stutz (2022).

== Early life ==
Jonah Hill Feldstein was born on December 20, 1983, in Los Angeles, California. His parents are Sharon Lyn (née Chalkin), a costume designer and fashion stylist, and Richard Feldstein, a tour accountant for Guns N' Roses. He has a younger sister, actress Beanie Feldstein (b. 1993). Their older brother, Jordan Feldstein (1977–2017), was a music manager for Robin Thicke and Maroon 5 until his sudden death at age 40 from a pulmonary embolism. Their parents were originally from Long Island, New York, and the family vacationed in the Catskill Mountains.

Hill and his siblings were raised in the wealthy Los Angeles neighborhood of Cheviot Hills, where he continues to reside, and attended the Center for Early Education, Brentwood School, and then Crossroads School in Santa Monica. He worked at Hot Rod Skateboard Shop on Westwood Boulevard in Los Angeles. After graduating from high school in 2002, he attended The New School, Bard College and the University of Colorado Boulder, but did not earn a degree.

Hill is Jewish and had a bar mitzvah ceremony.

== Career ==
=== 2000–2009: Comedy roles and stardom ===
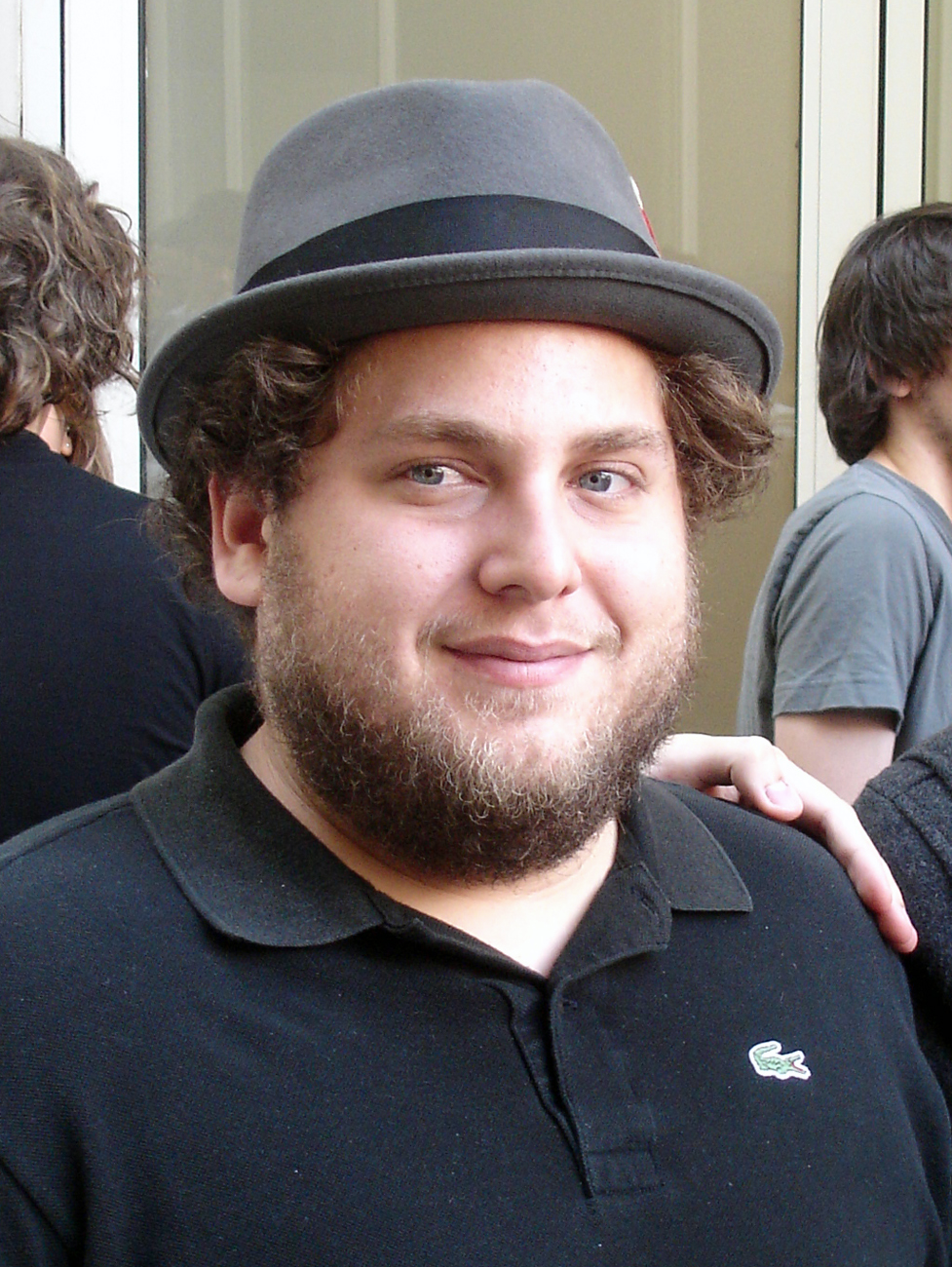
Hill in 2007

In college, Hill began writing his own plays and performing them in the Black and White bar in the East Village neighborhood of New York City. His plays developed a small following and helped him realize that his true desire was to act in films. He was befriended by Dustin Hoffman's children, Rebecca and Jake, who introduced him to their father. The elder Hoffman asked him to audition for a role in I Heart Huckabees, in which Hill made his film debut.

Hill then made a brief appearance in Judd Apatow's directorial debut, The 40-Year-Old Virgin, which led to his appearing in the role of a virgin video game tester in the comedy Grandma's Boy (2006), and roles in the comedies Accepted and Click, playing Adam Sandler's character's son in the latter. He had a larger supporting role in the Apatow-directed Knocked Up (2007). On television he played the dorm RA, Guy, on the first season of the Oxygen Network sitcom Campus Ladies, and guest-starred in an episode of Clark and Michael.

His first leading role was in the Apatow-produced comedy Superbad, where he appeared with Michael Cera, in roles based on the teen years of the film's writers, Seth Rogen and Evan Goldberg. It is often cited as the film that launched both Hill and Cera's careers. He followed it with an uncredited role as Dewey Cox's brother Nate in Walk Hard: The Dewey Cox Story in December 2007. He hosted Saturday Night Live on March 15, 2008, featuring musical guest Mariah Carey.

Hill wanted to be a writer since he was young and dreamed of joining the writing teams of The Simpsons, Saturday Night Live, and The Larry Sanders Show. At one point, Hill was writing a screenplay with close friend and I Heart Huckabees co-star Jason Schwartzman. He wrote Pure Imagination, a comedy for Sony about a man who develops an imaginary friend after a traumatic experience. Filming was expected to begin in 2008 but it has been stuck in "development hell" since then.

He next starred in Judd Apatow's third directorial feature, Funny People (2009) which also starred Adam Sandler, Eric Bana and Seth Rogen. He played Cooker in Fred Wolf's Strange Wilderness. He was an associate producer of the 2009 Sacha Baron Cohen mockumentary Brüno. He guest starred in The Simpsons episode "Pranks and Greens", portraying an immature man named Andy Hamilton who was hailed the best prankster in Springfield Elementary School history. He had an uncredited role in Night at the Museum: Battle of the Smithsonian as a security guard.

=== 2010–2019: Dramatic work and Jump Street films ===
After co-starring in Get Him to the Greek with Russell Brand, Hill started seeking more work in independent film. He turned down a role as one of the three principals in The Hangover to work with directors Jay Duplass and Mark Duplass in Cyrus (2010).

In July 2011, he appeared at ESPN's ESPY Awards sporting a much slimmer physique, stating he had lost 40 pounds (18 kg). In November 2011, along with Sam Worthington and Dwight Howard, he starred in commercials for the video game Call of Duty: Modern Warfare 3, making his first appearance with his new look. Also in 2011, he created the Fox animated series Allen Gregory with Andrew Mogel and Jarrad Paul. It received very negative reviews and was canceled by Fox on January 8, 2012.

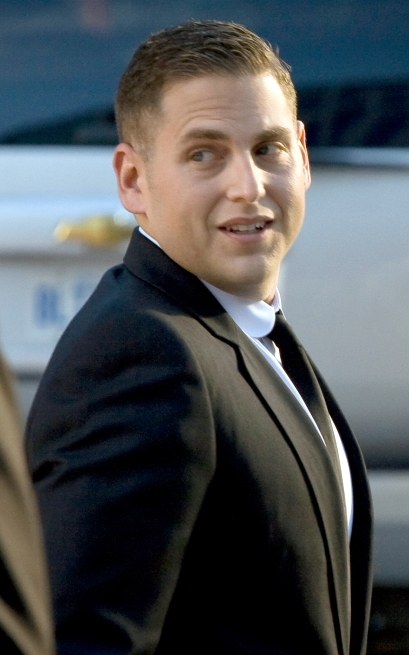
Hill at the 2011 Toronto International Film Festival

In 2011, Hill starred in Bennett Miller's feature film Moneyball with Brad Pitt and Philip Seymour Hoffman. It garnered favorable reviews. Critics noted Hill's performance as a departure from his usual comedy roles. He received a Golden Globe nomination for Best Performance by an Actor in a Supporting Role in a Motion Picture; and in late January 2012, received his first Oscar nomination, for Best Actor in a Supporting Role for the role.

In 2012, Hill co-starred with Channing Tatum in the film 21 Jump Street. It received an 84% rating on Rotten Tomatoes. He co-wrote the treatment for the 2012 film 21 Jump Street with screenwriter Michael Bacall. Later that year, Hill starred in the film The Watch with Ben Stiller and Vince Vaughn. Hill was a co-producer on the movie Brüno and did some writing for Sacha Baron Cohen, who "taught him how to become a better writer".

In 2011, it was announced that Hill was in talks to appear in Quentin Tarantino's film Django Unchained. Citing a possible conflict with his commitment to The Watch, Hill lamented that to act in a Tarantino movie was "the perfect next step" in his career. He was able to join the Django Unchained cast in a minor role, and it was released in 2012. He was invited to join the Academy of Motion Picture Arts and Sciences in June 2012.

In 2013, Hill appeared in This Is the End as himself, and in the biographical film The Wolf of Wall Street, and received his second Academy Award nomination for his work on the latter. In an interview with Howard Stern on January 21, 2014, Hill said he had accepted SAG's minimum wage of US$60,000 for The Wolf of Wall Street.

He voiced the Green Lantern in the adventure comedy The Lego Movie in February 2014, which blends computer animation and live action. He reprised his role as Morton Schmidt in 22 Jump Street (2014), the sequel to 21 Jump Street. His next performance was as Michael Finkel in the mystery thriller True Story (2015), with James Franco. In 2016, he played a surety agent for a production company in the Coen brothers' period comedy Hail, Caesar! and starred alongside Miles Teller in the biographical crime war comedy-drama War Dogs (2016) playing arms dealer Efraim Diveroli. In The Guardian, Wendy Ide wrote of his performance: "Jonah Hill is so repellent — all swagger, sweat and unapologetic sexism — in War Dogs, that for a while, you don't immediately realise what a blitzkrieg of a performance he delivers." That month, Hill also co-starred as a sausage named Carl in the adult animated comedy film Sausage Party, with Seth Rogen, Kristen Wiig, Bill Hader, Michael Cera, James Franco, Paul Rudd, Edward Norton and Salma Hayek.

Hill starred with Joaquin Phoenix, Rooney Mara, and Jack Black in Don't Worry, He Won't Get Far on Foot directed by Gus Van Sant. He directed the music video for Danny Brown's song "Ain't It Funny" in 2017, featuring Van Sant. Hill made his directorial debut from a screenplay he wrote with the film Mid90s (2018) starring Sunny Suljic, Lucas Hedges, and Katherine Waterston. which premiered at the Toronto International Film Festival on September 9, 2018, and was positively received. It was theatrically released in the United States on October 19, 2018. Also in 2018, Hill starred as Owen Milgrim in the Netflix dark comedy miniseries Maniac alongside Emma Stone. In the October 2018 issue of Vanity Fair, he was named to the magazine's best dressed list. In 2019, Hill played Lewis, a heavily Southern-accented book agent, in the comedy The Beach Bum.

Hill directed the music videos for the Sara Bareilles song "Gonna Get Over You" from her 2010 album Kaleidoscope Heart, the Danny Brown song "Ain't it Funny" from his 2016 album Atrocity Exhibition, the Travis Scott song "Wake Up" from his 2018 album Astroworld, and the Vampire Weekend song "Sunflower" from their 2019 album Father of the Bride.

On September 23, 2019, it was reported that Hill was in final negotiations to play the villain in Matt Reeves' The Batman. However, an agreement was not reached and Hill eventually departed the project.

=== 2020–present: Transition to directing ===
In 2020, Hill appeared alongside director Martin Scorsese in a commercial for Coca-Cola Energy, titled Show Up which aired during Super Bowl LIV.

Hill was cast in Adam McKay's political comedy satire Don't Look Up alongside Meryl Streep, Leonardo DiCaprio, Cate Blanchett, Jennifer Lawrence, Timothée Chalamet and Mark Rylance. Streep said on The Late Show with Stephen Colbert that she would be playing the President of the United States, with Hill playing the role of her son and Chief of Staff. The film is set around a global catastrophe and is described by Streep as a Dr. Strangelove type of satirical film and a "metaphor for global warming". The film was filmed in Massachusetts during the COVID-19 pandemic and was released on Netflix in December 2021.

In November 2021, Hill was cast as Jerry Garcia in the biopic feature of the Grateful Dead directed by Martin Scorsese. He will also produce the project under his Strong Baby banner along with Matt Dines. Hill directed (and appears in) Stutz, a 2022 Netflix documentary.

In 2023, he co-wrote and starred in You People, together with Eddie Murphy, Julia Louis-Dreyfus and Lauren London.

Hill wrote the screenplay and directed Keanu Reeves and Cameron Diaz in Outcome, a black comedy filmed in 2024 and released on Apple TV on April 10, 2026. Hill's next directorial effort, Cut Off, starring Kristen Wiig, was to be released theatrically by Warner Bros. Pictures but was removed from the company's release schedule in May.

== Personal life ==
In July 2011, Hill appeared at the 2011 ESPN ESPY Awards having lost a significant amount of weight; he later said he had done so to seek more serious roles, and said he had consulted with a trainer and a nutritionist, and had changed his diet to mainly sushi.

In 2016, Architectural Digest reported that Hill bought a four-bedroom loft in the Noho neighborhood of Manhattan in New York City.

Hill is known to train in Brazilian jiu jitsu and described it as "humbling". Hill has said that transcendental meditation and surfing are "two things [that] have changed my happiness level and my ability to cope with stress, anxiety and depression… [they've] really helped."

In October 2019, he and Gianna Santos were engaged; they ended the engagement in October 2020.

In October 2021, Hill asked fans to stop making comments about his physical appearance, stating: "I know you mean well but I kindly ask that you not comment on my body, good or bad I want to politely let you know it's not helpful and doesn't feel good. Much respect."

Hill legally dropped "Feldstein" from his name in 2023. People reported in the same year that he had his first child with girlfriend Olivia Millar. During an appearance on SmartLess in April 2026, Hill mentioned he and Millar were married.

In 2023, Hill was accused of being emotionally abusive and a "misogynist narcissist" by ex-girlfriend Sarah Brady, whom he dated in 2021. Brady, a surfing instructor and law student, publicly shared several text exchanges between the pair in which Hill said he could not continue the relationship if she continued surfing with other men, posting pictures of herself in a swimsuit, and spending time with friends of whom he did not approve.

During the same month, former child actress Alexa Nikolas accused Hill of shoving her against a door and kissing her without her consent during a party at Justin Long's house when she was 16 years old and he was 24. Nikolas alleged to Business Insider that Hill and Long were supplying her with alcohol the entire night and stated that what Hill did to her "was a crime". Hill's attorney called Nikolas's accusations "a complete fabrication", stating that the event "never happened" and describing Nikolas as "demonstrably unreliable" and a "serial accuser". A representative for Long said that he "has no knowledge of what may or may not have happened concerning Ms. Nikolas".

== Filmography ==
Films

| Year | Title | Role | Notes |
|---|---|---|---|
| 2004 | I Heart Huckabees | Bret | |
| 2005 | The 40-Year-Old Virgin | eBay Customer | |
| 2006 | Grandma's Boy | Barry | |
| 2006 | Click | Ben Newman at 17 Years Old | |
| 2006 | Accepted | Sherman Schrader | |
| 2006 | 10 Items or Less | Packy | |
| 2007 | Rocket Science | Junior Philosopher | |
| 2007 | Knocked Up | Jonah | |
| 2007 | Evan Almighty | Eugene "Gene" Tannenbaum | |
| 2007 | Superbad | Seth | |
| 2007 | Walk Hard: The Dewey Cox Story | Older Nate Cox | Uncredited |
| 2007 | HJ Train | Slick Rubin | Short film; also director, writer and producer |
| 2008 | Strange Wilderness | Cooker | |
| 2008 | Horton Hears a Who! | Tommy | Voice |
| 2008 | Forgetting Sarah Marshall | Matthew Van Der Wyk | |
| 2008 | Just Add Water | Eddie Tuckby | |
| 2009 | Night at the Museum: Battle of the Smithsonian | "Brundon" | Uncredited |
| 2009 | Brüno | —N/a | Associate producer |
| 2009 | Funny People | Leo Koenig | |
| 2009 | The Invention of Lying | Frank | |
| 2010 | Cyrus | Cyrus | |
| 2010 | How to Train Your Dragon | Snotlout Jorgenson | Voice |
| 2010 | Get Him to the Greek | Aaron Green | |
| 2010 | Megamind | Hal Stewart / Titan | Voice |
| 2010 | Legend of the Boneknapper Dragon | Snotlout Jorgenson | Voice; Short film |
| 2011 | Moneyball | Peter Brand | |
| 2011 | Gift of the Night Fury | Snotlout Jorgenson | Voice; Short film |
| 2011 | The Sitter | Noah Scott Griffith | Also executive producer |
| 2012 | 21 Jump Street | Morton Schmidt | Also story writer and executive producer |
| 2012 | The Watch | Franklin | |
| 2012 | Django Unchained | Bag Head No. 2 | Cameo |
| 2013 | This Is the End | Himself | |
| 2013 | The Wolf of Wall Street | Donnie Azoff | |
| 2014 | The Lego Movie | Green Lantern / Hal Jordan | Voice |
| 2014 | How to Train Your Dragon 2 | Snotlout Jorgenson | Voice |
| 2014 | 22 Jump Street | Morton Schmidt | Also story writer and producer |
| 2015 | True Story | Michael Finkel | |
| 2016 | Hail, Caesar! | Joseph Silverman | |
| 2016 | Sausage Party | Carl | Voice; also story writer and executive producer |
| 2016 | War Dogs | Efraim Diveroli | |
| 2016 | Why Him? | —N/a | Story writer and producer |
| 2017 | The Lego Batman Movie | Green Lantern / Hal Jordan | Voice Cameo |
| 2017 | Batman Is Just Not That Into You | Green Lantern / Hal Jordan | Voice, short film |
| 2018 | Don't Worry, He Won't Get Far on Foot | Donnie Green | |
| 2018 | Mid90s | —N/a | Director, writer, and producer |
| 2019 | How to Train Your Dragon: The Hidden World | Snotlout Jorgenson | Voice |
| 2019 | The Lego Movie 2: The Second Part | Green Lantern / Hal Jordan | Voice |
| 2019 | The Beach Bum | Lewis | |
| 2019 | Richard Jewell | —N/a | Producer |
| 2021 | Don't Look Up | Jason Orlean | |
| 2022 | Stutz | Himself | Documentary; also director and producer |
| 2022 | This Place Rules | —N/a | Producer |
| 2023 | You People | Ezra Cohen | Also co-writer and producer |
| 2024 | Y2K | —N/a | Producer |
| 2026 | Outcome | Ira Slitz | Also director, co-writer and producer |
| TBA | Cut Off | Ashton Bismol | Post-production; also director, co-writer and producer |

== Awards and honors ==
| Award | Category | Work | Win/nomination | Ref. |
|---|---|---|---|---|
| 84th Academy Awards | Best Supporting Actor | Moneyball | Nominated | |
| 86th Academy Awards | Best Supporting Actor | The Wolf of Wall Street | Nominated | |
