= Octopus: Sam Israel, the Secret Market, and Wall Street's Wildest Con =

2012 book by Guy Lawson

- Author: Guy Lawson
- Language: English
- Publisher: Crown Publishing
- Publication date: July 10, 2012
- Media type: Print (Hardback and e-book)
- Pages: 368 ppg
- ISBN: 0307716074

Octopus: Sam Israel, the Secret Market, and Wall Street's Wildest Con is a 2012 non-fiction book by the Canadian author and journalist Guy Lawson. The book was published by Crown Publishing on July 10, 2012.

== Synopsis ==
Octopus focuses on Wall Street trader Samuel Israel III, who attempted to commit hedge fund fraud by taking part in a "secret market" reported to have been run by the Federal Reserve. Lawson interviewed Israel for the book, commenting in an interview with CBS News that he was surprised at "how much truth there was to Israel's stories". The book covers Israel's attempt to save his company Bayou as well as his attempt to fake a suicide.

== Reception ==
Critical reception for Octopus was mostly positive. Fortune magazine praised Lawson for going "out of his way not to pass judgment on his subject, simply letting him spin an outrageous but definitely movie-worthy tale". Rob Copeland of hedge fund magazine Absolute Return had a different take, calling the book "exhausting." "Unlike the best in the narrative finance genre, this is a beach read with too few UV rays—leaving the reader cold," he wrote.
