= BeatBuddy =

Digital drum machine

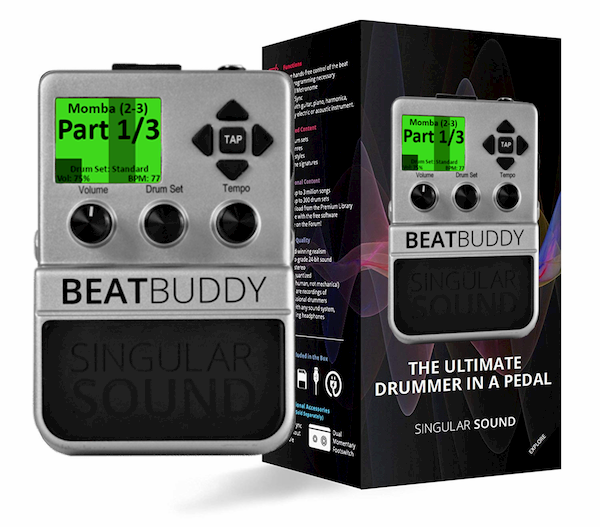
- BeatBuddy pedal-style drum machine
- Manufacturer: Singular Sound
- Dates: 2014 – present
- Price: $449

Technical specifications
- Hardware: Digital, LCD

Controls
- Pedal control: Pedal footswitch which recognizes single and double taps and holding the switch down

Input/output
- Inputs: Left and right mono 1/4"
- Outputs: Left and right mono 1/4" + stereo headphone out
- External control: MIDI Sync, USB port, footswitch

The BeatBuddy is a digital drum machine made by Singular Sound that is housed in the form of a stompbox unit. The floor-based format and pedal footswitch enable musicians (such as guitar, bass, and keyboard players) to control the device hands-free while they are playing an instrument.

Singular Sound is a Miami-based brand. David Packouz invented the pedal. The company first engineered and manufactured the device in 2014, after crowdfunding via Indiegogo. The BeatBuddy was intended to be a foot-controlled alternative to traditional tabletop, "hands-on" drum machines (such as the Roland TR-909 or the Roger Linn's LinnDrum). Since its release in 2014, the BeatBuddy has garnered positive reviews from magazines like Guitar Player, Guitar World and Sound On Sound, and won the Best in Show award at the 2015 NAMM Show.

== Design and operation ==
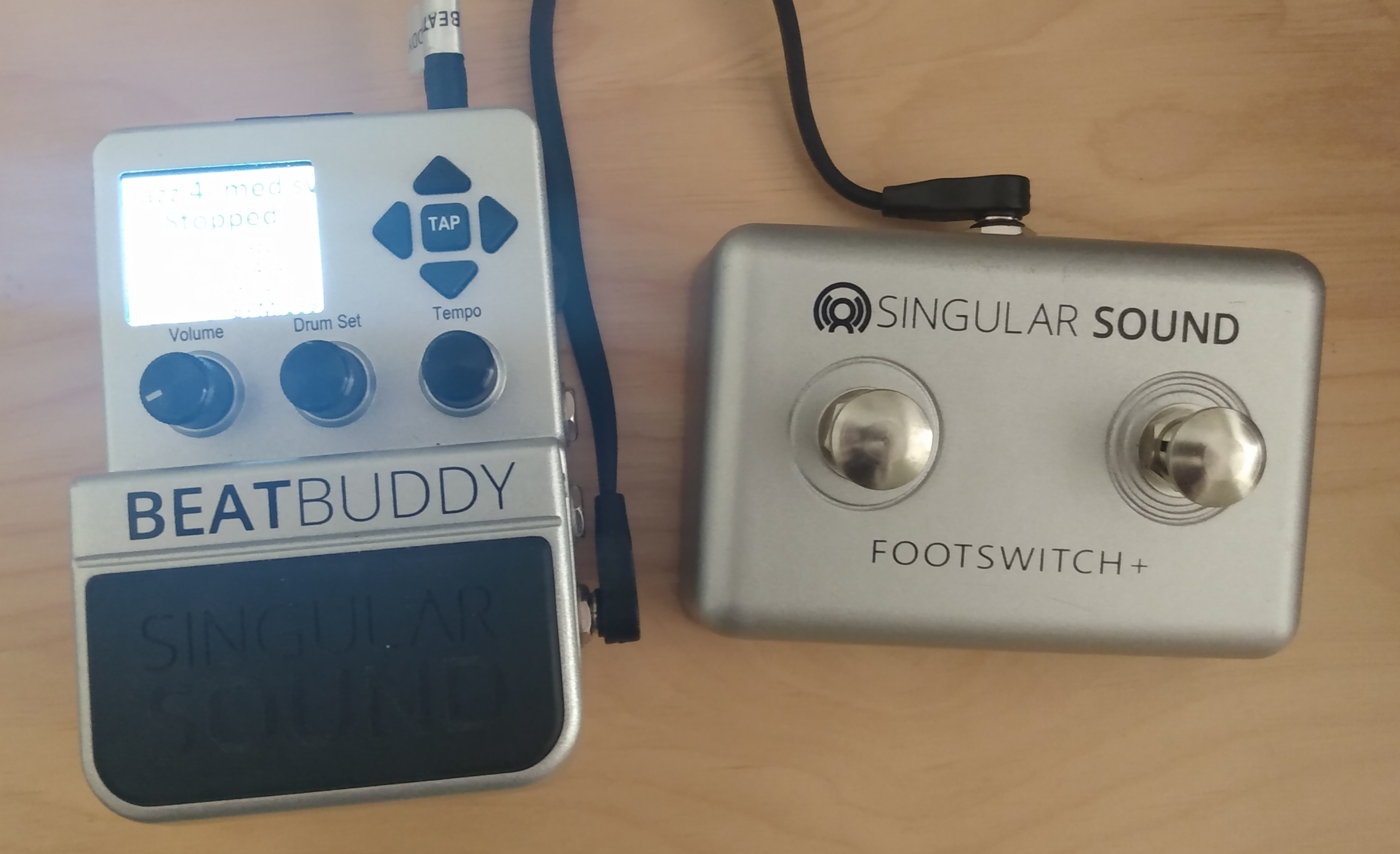
BeatBuddy drum machine pedal and its optional double footswitch.

Although its design resembles an ordinary guitar effects pedal (like those from Boss or DigiTech), the BeatBuddy is a drum machine and it does not apply any audio effects or processing to the input signals. It has two 1/4" input jacks for instruments or audio devices, but the BeatBuddy can also work as a standalone device (that is, without anything plugged in), if required. The input jacks are a convenience to allow performers to simplify their setup. For example, using the "pass-through" inputs, an electric piano player performing a one man band show can plug their piano into the BeatBuddy, then plug the BeatBuddy into a keyboard amplifier. Without this feature, the performer would typically require a separate mixer to combine the two audio sources.

The BeatBuddy is foot-controlled to start and stop the drum machine, and to trigger fills (fill-in lines and accents) and transitions between beats while it is active. There are rotary knobs for adjusting volume, tempo, and choice of drum set. Content navigation through menus is possible with four directional buttons and a central "tap" button next to the LCD screen. The LCD screen features a color display that uses different colors to indicate status settings.
