= David Packouz =

American former arms dealer, musician & inventor

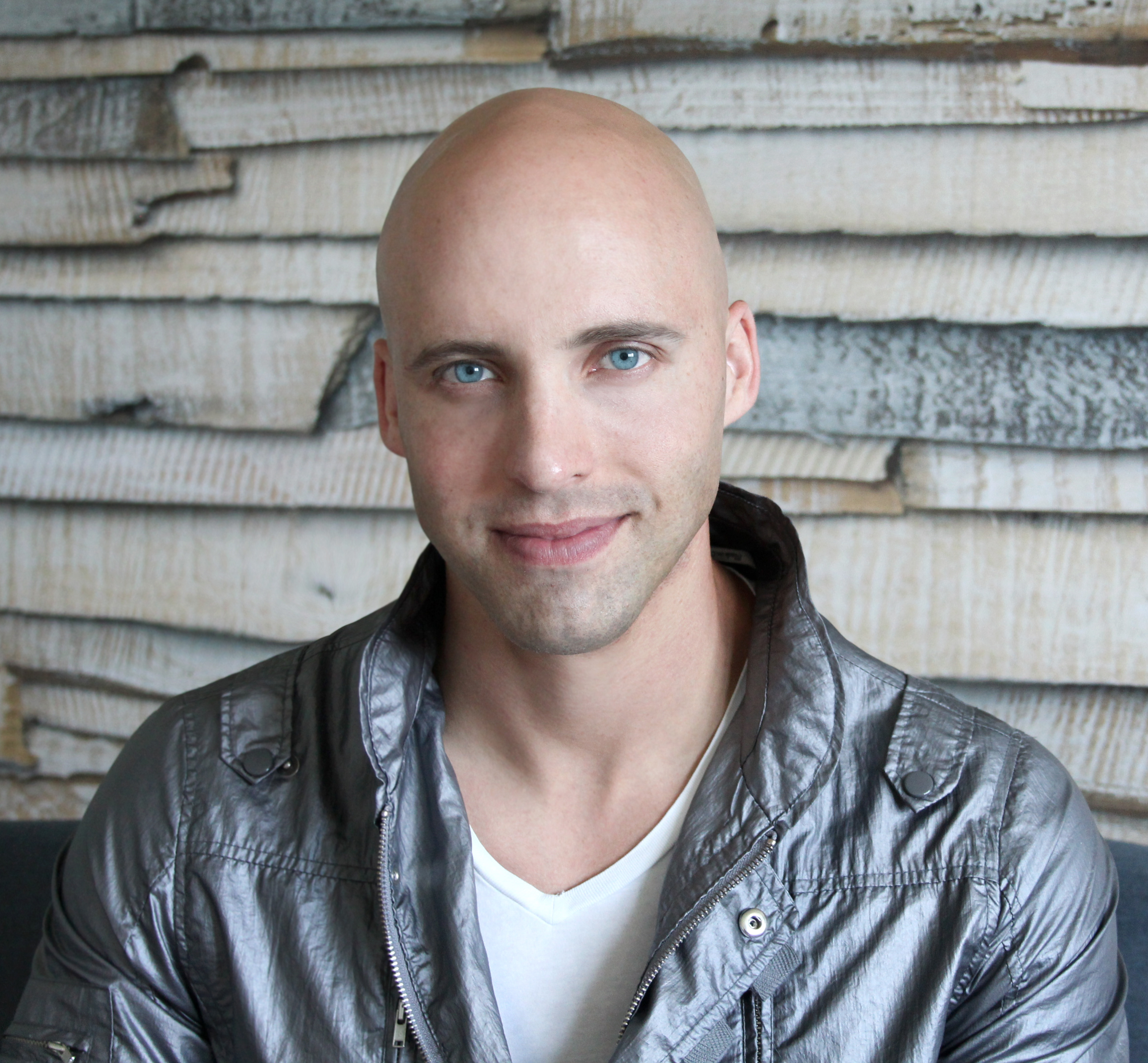
- Packouz in 2016
- Born: February 16, 1982 (age 44); St. Louis, Missouri, U.S.
- Occupations: Arms dealer, musician, and inventor
- Children: 1
- Conviction: Conspiracy to commit fraud against the United States
- Penalty: 7 months house arrest

David Mordechai Packouz (/pækhaʊs/ born February 16, 1982) is an American former arms dealer, musician and inventor.

Packouz joined Efraim Diveroli on the 17th of September 2005, in Diveroli's arms company AEY Inc. By the end of 2006, the company had won 149 contracts worth around $10.5 million. In early 2007, AEY secured a nearly $300 million U.S. government contract to supply the Afghan Army with 100 million rounds of AK-47 ammunition, aviation rockets and other munitions. The ammunition that AEY had secured in Albania to fulfill the contract had originally come from China, violating the terms of AEY's contract with the US Army, which bans Chinese ammunition. Packouz was aware that the products were prohibited and would not be accepted, and was instrumental in the covering up of the origins of the ammunition.

As a result of the publicity surrounding the contract and the age of the arms dealers – Packouz was 25 and Diveroli was 21 when AEY landed the ammunition deal – the United States Army began a review of its contracting procedures.

Packouz was sentenced to seven months of house arrest for conspiracy to defraud the United States. He is the central character of the 2016 Todd Phillips dramedy film War Dogs, in which he was portrayed by Miles Teller. Packouz himself has a cameo role in the film as a guitarist and singer at an elderly home.

Packouz later co-founded War Dogs Academy, an online school that teaches how to start a government contracting business.

Packouz went on to invent a guitar pedal drum machine, the BeatBuddy, and is currently the CEO of music technology company Singular Sound.

== Early life ==
Packouz was born in 1982 in St. Louis, Missouri, to a Jewish family. He is one of nine children, and the son of Shoshana and Rabbi Kalman Packouz, of the Orthodox Aish HaTorah, who authored the book How to Prevent an Intermarriage. Packouz was a Licensed Massage Therapist at the time of his working at AEY.

== Arms dealing and AEY ==
Packouz joined Efraim Diveroli's arms company AEY Inc. in 2005; Efraim was only 19 years old at the time, while David was 23. By the end of 2006, they had won 149 contracts worth around $10.5 million. In early 2007, AEY secured a nearly $300 million U.S. government contract to supply the Afghan Army with 100 million rounds of 7.62x39mm ammunition for the AK-47s used by the ANA, millions of rounds of 7.62x54R for SVD Dragunov sniper rifles, and aviation rockets. The ammunition that AEY had secured in Albania to fulfill the contract had originally come from China, violating the terms of AEY's contract with the US Army (which had prohibited filling the contract with Chinese ammunition).

AEY had failed to perform on numerous previous contracts, including sending potentially unsafe helmets and failure to deliver 10,000 Beretta pistols to Iraq. During a House Oversight and Government Reform Committee investigation documents were produced to show that federal agencies terminated, withdrew, or canceled at least seven previous contracts with AEY for poor quality or late deliveries.

Packouz responded by email to his associates that they had to get rid of the crates with the Chinese markings since Chinese products were prohibited and would not be accepted and AEY repackaged the Chinese ammunition which, according to the United States government, constituted fraud. The issue of the Chinese ammunition became the focal point of a months-long legal and logistical disturbance in the United States Army and the Department of Justice; AEY received much media attention, especially due to the age of the young Miami Beach arms dealers and their penchant for marijuana, earning them the epithet of "the stoner arms dealers" or "the dudes".

Diveroli and David Packouz pled guilty to one count of conspiracy to defraud the United States under the general conspiracy statute, 18 U.S.C. § 371, in January 2011. Diveroli was sentenced to four years in federal prison, while Packouz was sentenced to seven months' house arrest.

The story was published in Canadian journalist Guy Lawson's 2015 book Arms and the Dudes, and was produced into the 2016 film War Dogs by Todd Phillips.

== Personal life ==
Packouz has one daughter, Amabelle Jane, born in 2007.

In 2016, Packouz's company, Singular Sound, started a philanthropic partnership with non-profit organization Guitars Over Guns to provide BeatBuddy equipment to disadvantaged youth.

== Bibliography ==
- Arms and the Dudes (Simon & Schuster, 2015) ISBN 978-1-4516-6759-2.
