= Kalman Packouz =

American Orthodox rabbi

Rabbi Kalman Packouz
- Title: Rabbi

Personal life
- Born: May 15, 1950 Portland, Oregon, U.S.
- Died: November 15, 2019 (aged 69) South Florida, U.S.
- Buried: Israel
- Spouse: Shoshana Packouz
- Children: 9, including David Packouz

Religious life
- Religion: Judaism

Jewish leader
- Yeshiva: Aish HaTorah

Kalman Packouz (May 15, 1950 — November 15, 2019) was an Orthodox rabbi who pioneered various Jewish educational initiatives geared towards baalei teshuva ("returnee to Judaism") outreach.

== Biography ==
Packouz was raised in Portland, Oregon, and attended Temple Beth Israel, a Reform temple. In 1979, after receiving rabbinical ordination in Jerusalem, Packouz started the first Aish HaTorah branch in St. Louis. Packouz served for ten years as executive director of Aish HaTorah international operations, and was head of the Miami office of Aish HaTorah's worldwide programs. He was a contributor to simpletoremember.com. He was also a special correspondent for the Sun Sentinel. He was married to Shoshana, with whom he fathered nine children, including former international arms dealer and inventor David Packouz. Packouz died in 2019.

== Intermarriage book ==
Packouz spoke out on Jewish continuity through marriage, and in 1976 authored the book, How to Stop an Intermarriage. The book was later expanded and retitled as: How to Prevent an Intermarriage - A Guide For Parents to Prevent Broken Hearts.

== Shabbat Shalom Weekly ==
In 1992, Packouz launched the Shabbat Shalom Weekly, an electronic publication distributed each week via fax and email.

== Kotel Webcam ==
In 1997, Packouz created Window on the Wall, a 24-hour live webcam from the Western Wall in Jerusalem.
