= Matthew Cox =

Convicted felon, confidence man

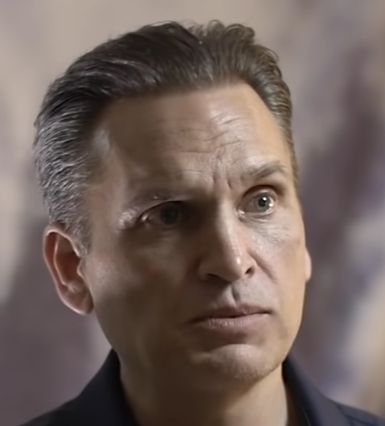
- Born: Matthew Bevan Cox; July 2, 1969 (age 57); Florida, U.S.
- Occupations: Mortgage broker, author
- Spouse: Jess Cox
- Status: Released July 19, 2019
- Conviction: April 10, 2007 (pleaded guilty)
- Criminal charges: Bank fraud, identity theft, passport fraud, conspiracy to commit mortgage fraud, probation violation
- Penalty: 26 years in federal prison, later reduced to 15 years (served 12.5 years), $6 million restitution

Matthew Bevan Cox (born July 2, 1969) is an American former mortgage broker, admitted mortgage fraudster, con man, and true crime author who has written several stories paralleling his real life crimes.

Cox falsified documents to make it appear that he owned properties, and then fraudulently obtained several mortgages on them for five to six times their actual worth. He acquired millions of dollars this way; estimates report the amount at between US$15 million and $55 million. Cox's first conviction occurred in 2002 when he was sentenced to probation for mortgage fraud. He then sold the mortgage company he owned in a Tampa, Florida-area firm. He began his life as a dedicated criminal in central Florida after that offense, before fleeing the area when his activities were discovered. His crime spree continued across the southern and southwestern United States, eventually landing him on the United States Secret Service's Most Wanted list. He was aided by several female accomplices, some of whom are in prison or have served time there for their participation in his fraudulent mortgage practices. Cox was arrested on November 16, 2006. Indicted on 42 counts, and facing prison sentences of up to 125 years, he plea bargained his sentence down to a maximum of 54 years on April 11, 2007, and was sentenced to 26 years on November 17, 2007. He was released from prison in July 2019.

Cox is currently a full time true crime author, podcaster, a keynote speaker. He lives and works in central Florida.

His story is well chronicled and has been featured on Dateline NBC, CNBC's American Greed, in Fortune magazine, Bloomberg Businessweek, Playboy magazine, and other media outlets.

== Early life ==
Born in Florida, Cox struggled in school due to severe dyslexia. His teachers advised him to get a job in which he worked with his hands, so he studied sculpture at the University of South Florida, and majored in art. Cox took a job as an insurance agent after college, but his income disappointed him, and he sought out higher-paying work.

== Adult life ==
=== Tampa, Florida ===
Cox painted sprawling art deco murals in several of the Tampa apartments he fraudulently obtained.

Cox left his job as an insurance agent to work as a mortgage broker for a local company. While there he developed a reputation for unscrupulousness, which was heightened by his authorship of an unpublished 317-page manuscript entitled The Associates. The novel's protagonist, who shares many traits in common with Cox, travels the country committing mortgage fraud. Cox told co-workers about the book, and elaborated its details to them. According to a former co-worker: "He sent it to a lot of people to see if they thought it worked."

After being fired from the company when he was convicted of mortgage fraud in 2002, Cox faked a good credit history, and used that to buy dozens of homes and properties. In one instance he used the social security number of a toddler, and all of his documents—references, bank letters, rent receipts, W-2s from nonexistent employers—were counterfeit. He used his skills as an artist to decorate the properties with elaborate art deco-style murals. Several of his future girlfriends said that his painting talents were part of his allure, though the St. Petersburg Times described his works as copies of murals by Tamara de Lempicka. Cox charmed Alison Arnold, a young local married woman, into believing he could give her a wealthy and luxurious life. While courting Arnold, she said, he took her to crime films such as The Italian Job and Catch Me if You Can—which he reportedly adored and watched several times—and detailed his criminal plans to her.

Cox often filed fraudulent mortgage documents, and in several cases was able to mortgage properties for five to six times their actual worth. In this practice, known as "shotgunning" in the real estate community, Cox either himself forged or had accomplices attain inflated appraisals to increase the value of the mortgages. One of his accomplices was a detention officer, who acquired 14 properties worth nearly $600,000, while making $35,568 a year in his job. Cox took advantage of the Hillsborough County school district by selling it a property for much more than its appraised value, and arranged financing on a $90,000 house for future Florida Representative Janet Cruz. He recorded that sale for $233,000, and hired Cruz to do some rezoning research. Cruz claims she was unaware he inflated the sale price, and that she was never paid for her research.

When a female accomplice rented a house in Pinellas County as part of Cox's schemes, then faked ownership of the property, the owner found out about the fraud. A title company manager had become suspicious of a loan Cox's accomplice was applying for on the house and called the property's real owner. The Clearwater Police department was contacted, and they began an investigation.

Cox and Arnold grew apart and eventually Cox began courting another woman. Rebecca Hauck, a divorced mother of one, had moved to Tampa after falling into debt and declaring bankruptcy in Las Vegas. She had already committed criminal offenses before meeting Cox, and was fired from a job in Las Vegas for forging her employer's name on checks that she used to pay her debts. They met through an online dating service. She, unlike Arnold, was willing to leave her son. After finding out that Jeff Testerman, a reporter for the St. Petersburg Times, was investigating him, Cox and Hauck left town. Two days later, on December 14, 2003, the newspaper published Testerman's story, "Dubious Housing Deals Line Avenue".

The story detailed Urban Equities Inc., an investment company started by Cox. His ex-wife Keyla Burgos, who is mother to his son, was one of the two shareholders. Despite her involvement in the purchase or sale of 58 properties in six years, she claimed that she and the other remaining shareholder were "incapable of operating or managing Urban Equity", so the company was put into receivership. His partners claimed to be unaware of Cox's dealings, and they were financially ruined by the collapse of the company.

This article coincided with Cox getting a tip from a friend that a task force had been put together at the Tampa PD to investigate him, and the case had just been handed over to the FBI for further investigation. Partially exposing Cox's scheme at this time was that all the synthetic identities he had created were based on the names of the characters of Quentin Tarantino's gangster film Reservoir Dogs, and had obvious last names such as Red, Blue, Green, etc. Cox used these identities to create a false impression of a quickly appreciating neighborhood, deceiving banks and appraisers into believing homes that were actually worth $40,000 had a value of $190,000.

=== Crime spree across the southern states ===
Cox and Hauck fled to Atlanta and settled there. He became a fugitive when he failed to report to his probation officers. During this period, he traveled to Mobile, Alabama, and using the identity of a former co-worker, acquired credit cards and the credit needed to rent a home. After filing false documents that indicated he owned the house, Cox took out mortgages on the property for several hundred thousand dollars. He took out one mortgage under the name of The Simpsons character "C. Montgomery Burns". Cox acquired several more properties, then the couple moved to the Tallahassee, Florida area.

Authorities in the Atlanta area discovered Cox's activities, and eventually his identity. On August 6, 2004, the United States Secret Service issued arrest warrants for Cox, alleging conspiracy, identity theft, mail and wire fraud, money laundering, and social security number fraud. News broadcasts showed photos of Cox and Hauck and requested that viewers provide any information pertaining to their whereabouts. By spring 2005, the couple had eluded authorities for eighteen months, using dozens of identities, including ones stolen from former co-workers and acquaintances. Cox also stole identities from the homeless by posing as a survey–taking Red Cross worker to acquire their social security numbers. At this point, due to remorse and anxiety, Arnold called the FBI and confessed. She was sentenced to two years in prison for numerous offenses, including conspiracy to commit bank fraud and identity theft. Arnold was also ordered to pay $300,000 in restitution to her victims. Shortly thereafter, Cox filed multiple mortgages on two houses for $886,318 in Columbia, South Carolina in less than a week. An abstractor noticed this, and a fraud alert was issued on one of Cox's money-laundering bank accounts. He was arrested when he returned to the bank to make a transaction, but he told authorities his name was "Gary Lee Sullivan", one of about thirty aliases Cox had at the time; because "Sullivan" had no open warrants, the police released him. Shortly afterwards, Cox and Hauck moved to Houston, but they separated and she remained there in hiding under an assumed name. A year later the Secret Service found Hauck and arrested her. Convicted on numerous counts, Hauck was sentenced to six years in prison, and five years of supervised release. In May 2006, after being on the run from authorities for two and a half years, Cox was placed on the Secret Service's Most Wanted Fugitives List.

=== Nashville, Tennessee ===
The week that Hauck was sentenced to prison, Cox was living in Nashville, Tennessee under the name Joseph Carter. He was dating a single mother, Amanda Gardner, who was unaware of his criminal past, and posing as the owner of a home restoration business. He told her he was from a wealthy family, and his silver 2005 Infiniti and "fashionably decorated bungalow" seemed to confirm this. Cox used a falsified passport to travel to Europe on a cruise of the Greek Isles with Gardner. He did not spend much time in Italy or Greece due to his intense fear of Interpol. Gardner's 60-year-old babysitter, Patsy Taylor, suspected something about "Carter" didn't add up. When she found out he was originally from Florida, she researched him online and eventually discovered that the man she knew as "Joseph Carter" was really Matthew Cox. Fearing for the safety of Gardner's son, Taylor reached out to Jeff Testerman of the St. Petersburg Times, who had closely followed Cox for more than three years. Testerman in turn put Taylor in touch with Rebecca Hauck's lawyer. Hauck's family paid Taylor for Cox's address, as this information could be used to reduce Hauck's sentence. He temporarily escaped capture due to a chance series of events. Cox and Gardner's home was burglarized, and they checked into a hotel. On November 16, 2006, Cox was arrested by a half dozen Secret Service agents—who had been pursuing him for more than two years—when he and Gardner returned from the hotel. He had been building Williamson a house using his fake identity and credit history, but, fortunately for his friend, he was arrested before Williamson could give him a down payment. Hauck's sentence was later reduced from 70 to 42 months as a result of her assistance in Cox's capture.

=== Prison ===
Cox faced 42 counts of fraud, in addition to felony charges for fleeing while on probation from a previous conviction. Facing a maximum sentence of over 400 years, he negotiated a plea bargain agreement that gave him a maximum of 54 years, and a $2 million fine. On April 10, 2007; Cox formally pleaded guilty to six counts of bank fraud, identity theft, passport fraud, conspiracy to commit mortgage fraud, and violating the terms of his probation from his 2002 mortgage fraud conviction. On November 17, 2007, federal judge Timothy Batten sentenced Cox to 26 years in prison. He also ordered Cox to pay $5.97 million in restitution.

Cox, United States Federal Bureau of Prisons Register #40171-018, was incarcerated at Federal Correctional Complex, Coleman.

Estimates of the amount of money Cox fraudulently obtained range from $5 million to $15 million and possibly more than $25 million. He is believed to have fraudulently mortgaged more than 100 properties. Cox was ordered to serve a 26-year sentence at the Federal Correctional Institution (FCI), a low-security facility in Coleman, Florida. He was ordered to pay $5.97 million in restitution and required to testify against his co-conspirators.

As of 2010, the United States Attorney's office has not brought charges against any of his 13 Tampa-area cohorts, even though Assistant U.S. Attorney Robert A. Mosakowski informed a judge in 2005 that he planned to bring charges against up to 13 accomplices.

While in prison, Cox mailed several letters to the St. Petersburg Times in 2008 in which he accused politician Kevin White of taking bribes from him during Cox's criminal career. He claims he made payoffs to White, an ultimately successful candidate for the Tampa City Council, in 2002 and 2003. Cox said White told him he could not receive the money directly, and suggested that Cox have friends donate $500 each, and then reimburse them.

Records and statements from those who donated show that Cox did in fact make numerous contributions to White's campaign, and reimbursed others who did so as well. White, he claims, agreed to vote to rezone vacant properties in Tampa and Ybor City. When Cox was first arrested, the FBI talked to him about White, whom they were also investigating, and he told them the same information. He claimed to have paid him $7,000 in cash in addition to the recorded contributions he arranged. When White and a fellow City Council member were told Cox's contributions might have been illegal in 2004, his colleague told the police, while White kept silent. White has denied that he knew these contributions were reimbursed, and called Cox's accusations "the jailhouse ramblings of a reputed con man." White said he befriended Cox when he came to believe the con man was interested in revitalizing Tampa Heights.

Cox had fled the Tampa area before White cast any rezoning votes, so there is no voting record which could help confirm the validity of his accusations. In 2012, White, who had gone on to serve as Hillsborough County Commissioner, was convicted of unrelated federal bribery and corruption charges and sentenced to three years in federal prison.

During his time in prison, Cox introduced himself to arms trader Efraim Diveroli after reading a Rolling Stone article on him, and encouraged him to write a memoir. Diveroli agreed to let Cox write the memoir, as he had "boxes of evidence" under his bed while fighting his own trial. When Diveroli left the complex, he took the manuscript with him and Cox claims to not have been compensated for it since; as of 2019 the two are in a mediated settlement process. After writing this memoir, other inmates approached Cox to write their stories, resulting in a number of true crime manuscripts being written by Cox in prison.

He was released from federal prison on July 19, 2019.

== Unpublished novel ==
Authorities were amazed by the similarities between Cox's actual crimes and his unpublished manuscript, The Associates, which they found several years before Cox was arrested. The novel's protagonist, Christian, is 5 ft 7 in (170 cm), with brown hair and blue eyes. Cox is 5 ft 6 in (168 cm), with brown hair and green eyes. Both the protagonist and Cox drove a silver Audi TT, illegally acquired Tampa real estate worth $2.7 million, were alumni of the University of South Florida, had an intense fear of Interpol, and formerly worked selling insurance.

In the novel, the protagonist and a female accomplice rent a home like the one Cox and Hauck rented in Atlanta. The character then opens accounts at several banks in the area so that he can use them for money laundering purposes, which Cox did. Then, Cox, like the character in the manuscript, forged a document, claiming that the mortgage on the home—which he did not even own—was paid off. The character in the manuscript then contacted lenders, and told them he owned the property outright. Cox was imprisoned for this same crime. It is believed that Cox researched the book and consulted lawyers and real estate professionals to "research for a book about a con man" - but used the insights he gained during these interviews not only for his book, but to prepare his actual fraudulent plans.

== Works ==
=== Books ===
- Once a Gun Runner...: The Efraim Diveroli Memoir (2016)
- Generation Oxy: From High School Wrestlers to Pain Pill Kingpins (2017)
- BENT: How a Homeless Teen Became One of the Cybercrime Industry's Most Prolific Counterfeiters (2018)
- It's Insanity: The Bizarre Story of Dr. Patch Adams' Quest for Universal Health Care and Megalomaniacs' Scheme for World Domination (2020)
- Shark in the Housing Pool: Law, Economics and Major League Baseball (2020)
- The Program: A True Story of Murder, Money, and a Taste of Corruption (2020)
- Devil Exposed: A Twisted Tale of Drug Trafficking, Corruption and Murder in the City of Angels (2021)
- Bailout: Corruption, Greed and Murder in the Tampa Bay Housing Market (2021)
