= Cut Off (unreleased film) =

- Directed by: Jonah Hill
- Written by: Jonah Hill; Ezra Woods
- Produced by: Jonah Hill; Matt Dines; Ali Goodwin
- Starring: Jonah Hill; Kristen Wiig; Adriana Barraza; Camila Cabello; Langston Kerman; Chelsea Peretti; Cary Christopher; Bette Midler; Nathan Lane
- Production company: Strong Baby Productions
- Distributed by: Warner Bros. Pictures
- Country: United States
- Language: English

Cut Off is an unreleased American comedy film directed, produced, and co-written by Jonah Hill. It stars Hill, Kristen Wiig, Adriana Barraza, Camila Cabello, Langston Kerman, Chelsea Peretti, Cary Christopher, Bette Midler, and Nathan Lane.

The film was set to be released in the United States by Warner Bros. Pictures.

== Premise ==
Two wealthy siblings are forced to support themselves after their parents cut them off.

== Cast ==
- Jonah Hill
- Kristen Wiig
- Bette Midler
- Nathan Lane
- Adriana Barraza
- Camila Cabello
- Langston Kerman
- Chelsea Peretti
- Cary Christopher

== Production ==
In March 2025, it was announced that Jonah Hill would direct, produce, and co-write a new comedy film, with him starring. In August, Kristen Wiig joined the cast.

Principal photography began in late September 2025, in California, with Bette Midler and Nathan Lane joining the cast. In October, Adriana Barraza, Camila Cabello and Langston Kerman were added to the cast. In November, Chelsea Peretti was added to the cast. In January 2026, Cary Christopher revealed he was a part of the cast.

Hill described the movie as a mix of Step Brothers, Clueless and Trading Places.

== Release ==
On June 26, 2026, it was reported that Cut Off had been considered "unreleasable" and that there were no plans to release the film at any point in the foreseeable future. However, a representative for Hill later confirmed that the film was still in post-production and its release date was pushed to reflect that factor. The film was originally scheduled to be released in the United States on July 17, 2026, by Warner Bros. Pictures, before being removed from its release schedule in May 2026.
