= Stutz (film) =

2022 documentary film by Jonah Hill

- Release poster
- Directed by: Jonah Hill
- Produced by: Chelsea Barnard; Diane Becker; Matt Dines; Alison Goodwin; Jonah Hill; Melanie Miller; Mark Monroe; Joaquin Phoenix
- Starring: Jonah Hill; Phil Stutz
- Cinematography: Christopher Blauvelt
- Edited by: Nick Houy; Nicholas Ramirez
- Music by: Emile Mosseri
- Production companies: Strong Baby Productions; Valentine; Fishbowl Films; Diamond Docs
- Distributed by: Netflix
- Release date: November 14, 2022
- Running time: 96 minutes
- Country: United States
- Language: English

Stutz is a 2022 American documentary film produced and directed by actor Jonah Hill. The film chronicles the life and career of psychiatrist Dr. Phil Stutz, Hill's therapist.

In August 2022, Hill revealed that he would not be promoting any of his upcoming work, including Stutz, to protect himself from anxiety attacks. The film began streaming on Netflix on 14 November 2022.

== Premise ==
In a series of conversations, Jonah Hill and his therapist Phil Stutz delve into their life stories and mental health, their approach to therapy, and Stutz's doctor-patient relationships.

== Reception ==
On the review aggregator website Rotten Tomatoes, the film holds an approval rating of 96% based on 23 reviews. The website's critics consensus reads, "A funny, emotional glimpse at the dynamic between a psychiatrist and his patient, Stutz heartwarmingly underscores the importance of an active focus on one's mental health." On Metacritic, the film has a weighted average score of 76 out of 100, based on five critics, indicating "generally favorable reviews".

Lisa Kennedy of The New York Times gave Stutz a positive review and described it as "a film that skillfully navigates vulnerability, brainy insights and artistry". Noel Murray of the Los Angeles Times also gave the film a generally positive review, referring to it as "a simple but emotionally affecting documentary" and as a "a candid look at Hill’s self-doubts as a person and an artist." He concludes his review by acknowledging the film's that Stutz has a worthy goal, "changing the perspectives of people who might be hurting right now" and that "for those willing to go with its flow, it has a real power".

Rick Allen of RogerEbert.com gave Stutz three out of four stars. In his review, he criticizes the beginning of film, describing it as "intriguing but stuffy" and "too much in its head" and notes that the editing was "distracting". Allen then states that "as a formal experimentation by an actor whose filmmaking talents are only the latest chapter in his Hollywood story, the documentary offers a touching reflection on Jonah Hill, The Star."

David Ehrlich of IndieWire gave the movie a B. He describes it as "a strange and poignant documentary about his therapist unfolds like a cross between "The Rehearsal" and a self-help tape". Ehrlich states that "whatever else this movie becomes, it always remains a heartfelt tribute from one celebrity to his favorite shrink" and notes that Stutz "is more for him [Hill] than it is for us".

Psychotherapist James Davies called the film a "fascinating and engaging watch" but noted that he didn't think that "watching a documentary - and temporarily adopting some of its suggestions - will ever be a replacement for good, long-term, in-person therapy".
