= Efraim Diveroli =

American author and former arms dealer

- Born: December 20, 1985 (age 40); Miami Beach, Florida, U.S.
- Occupations: Author and former arms dealer
- Status: Released August 2014
- Convictions: Conspiracy to defraud the United States, felon in possession of a firearm
- Penalty: 4 years in federal prison

Efraim Diveroli (born December 20, 1985) is an American former arms dealer, convicted fraudster, and author. Diveroli controlled AEY, Inc., a company that secured significant contracts as a major weapons contractor for the U.S. Department of Defense. AEY was suspended by the U.S. government due to contractual violations.

AEY had supplied Chinese ammunition to Afghanistan, attempting to conceal its origin by repackaging it as Albanian. Although this did not violate the American arms embargo against China, because the ammo was manufactured pre 1989, it was a violation of their contract with the government which said no Chinese ammo at all. Concealing its origin then became an act of fraud. This incident prompted the United States Army to initiate a review of its contracting procedures. Efraim Diveroli, at the age of 21, and his partner, David Packouz, at 25, gained notoriety for their involvement in the high-profile ammunition deal. Subsequently, Diveroli was sentenced to four years in federal prison.

Diveroli's story became the focal point of the 2016 Todd Phillips film, War Dogs, in which Jonah Hill portrayed Diveroli, and Miles Teller portrayed Packouz. Additionally, a memoir co-authored by Diveroli and Matthew Cox was published in 2016.

== Early life ==
Diveroli was born on December 20, 1985, in Miami Beach, Florida, the son of Ateret and Michael Diveroli. His family was Orthodox Jewish, strictly observing all traditional Jewish laws. He studied at Hebrew Academy in Miami Beach. His Iranian-born grandfather, Yoav Botach, was one of the wealthiest property owners in Los Angeles, and his uncle is celebrity rabbi Shmuley Boteach.

== AEY Inc ==
=== Formation of AEY Inc ===
Diveroli returned home to Miami Beach, Florida in March 2001 at the age of fifteen. After an argument with his uncle, he told his father he wanted to open a business specializing in arms, ammunition trading, and defense contracts with the U.S. government. He convinced his father to sell him a shell company, AEY, Inc., named after the first initials of him and his siblings, which his father had incorporated as a small printing business, but had not done anything with for years. Diveroli's success in arms dealing quickly attracted attention within the industry, he was labeled as an "arms wunderkind" by the Miami Herald and as a "stoner arms dealer" by Rolling Stone as a result of Diveroli's drug use.

=== Arms trading dynamics ===
During the Cold War, the USA & USSR engaged in a protracted and massive arms race. Millions of weapons were stockpiled throughout Eastern Europe. When the Cold War ended, and the immediate threat of violence subsided, arms dealers started moving some of these weapons. The sales that followed formed the "gray market" where non-state actors (such as militia or terrorist groups) and legitimate government-sanctioned buyers could procure arms through illegal foreign government sales. The Pentagon wanted access to this gray market to arm the militias it was creating in Iraq and Afghanistan. The US government therefore required intermediaries, or proxies, to undertake the more covert and intricate facets of arms-related activities. Companies such as AEY emerged as entities facilitating these operations, playing a role in executing tasks that were considered sensitive or clandestine in nature.

=== Contracts and controversies ===
Diveroli began working during a period of heavy arms trading as a teenager in a one-room apartment in Miami. Equipped with nothing more than a laptop, he sought to enter the industry from the comfort of his couch. He began surfing solicitations on fbo.gov (now sam.gov), or FedBizOpps, a government website where contracts are posted. He began by bidding on small contracts with the financial help of Ralph Merrill, with whom he did business during his time working for his uncle. By the age of eighteen, Diveroli had become a millionaire by continuing to beat out big corporations like Northrop Grumman, Lockheed and BAE Systems. In the words of Rolling Stone, Diveroli had "an appetite for risk and all-devouring ambition."

After steadily increasing the size of his contracts and developing a track record of success, Diveroli's company AEY, Inc. was awarded a $298 million contract by the Pentagon to provide arms and munitions to the allied forces in Afghanistan. In meeting the contractual obligations set by the United States government, Efraim Diveroli became involved in interactions with individuals of questionable repute within the arms trade. These interactions extended to engaging with unscrupulous weapons traders, diplomatically compromised individuals, and individuals identified as soldiers of fortune. Diveroli's responsibilities further involved negotiating agreements with foreign defense ministers, participating in meetings held at diplomatic embassies, and responding to communication from high-ranking officials within the United States Army.

On March 27, 2008, the U.S. government suspended AEY, Inc. for infringing upon the terms of its contract; in violation of a pre-existing arms embargo, the company was accused of supplying ammunition manufactured in China to the Afghan National Army and police. United States Army documents showed that the company totaled more than $200 million in contracts to supply ammunition, rifles, and other weapons in 2007. As a result of publicity surrounding the contract, the United States Army began a review of its contracting procedures.

The United States House Committee on Oversight and Government Reform ruled the ammunition "unserviceable". AEY had also failed to perform on numerous previous contracts, including sending potentially unsafe helmets and failure to deliver 10,000 Beretta pistols to Iraq.

=== Convictions and lawsuits ===
Ammoworks, a company owned by Diveroli, continued selling arms while he awaited trial for conspiracy. In late August 2008, he pleaded guilty on one count of conspiracy, and was sentenced to four years in prison on January 4, 2011. He was further sentenced for possessing a weapon while out on bond and had his overall sentence reduced for assisting in the investigation of the prosecution. Diveroli's former partner David Packouz was sentenced to seven months house arrest.

Packouz, along with Ralph Merrill, the group's former chief financier, later filed separate lawsuits against Diveroli seeking payment of millions of dollars they say they were owed in connection to the weapons contract with the U.S. government.

=== Debarment termination ===
In 2022, Diveroli opted into an exhaustive government review of his qualifications, following which the U.S. Army formally terminated his debarment and confirmed that he was fully qualified and fit to contract with the federal government once again.

== War Dogs ==
The story of Diveroli's arms deals is the subject of the Todd Phillips comedy/drama film War Dogs, starring Jonah Hill as Diveroli and Miles Teller as his partner, David Packouz, based on the reporting done by Canadian journalist Guy Lawson for Rolling Stone. In 2016, Diveroli filed a lawsuit against Warner Bros. Entertainment Inc., director Todd Phillips, producer Bradley Cooper, and others, seeking to block release of the film. Diveroli's suit against Warner Bros. claimed that the basis for the film was taken from his self-published memoir Once a Gun Runner, which Matthew Cox claims to have written while in prison with Diveroli, himself having been convicted of real estate fraud.
