= Outcome (film) =

2026 film by Jonah Hill

- Promotional release poster
- Directed by: Jonah Hill
- Written by: Jonah Hill; Ezra Woods
- Produced by: Jonah Hill; Matt Dines; Ali Goodwin
- Starring: Keanu Reeves; Jonah Hill; Matt Bomer; Cameron Diaz
- Cinematography: Benoît Debie
- Edited by: Nick Houy; Nicholas Ramirez
- Music by: Jon Brion
- Production companies: Apple Studios; Strong Baby Productions
- Distributed by: Apple TV (under Apple Original Films)
- Release date: April 10, 2026
- Running time: 84 minutes
- Country: United States
- Language: English

Outcome is a 2026 American black comedy film directed, co-written, and produced by Jonah Hill. It stars Keanu Reeves as an actor who embarks on an apology tour after a blackmail threat. The supporting cast includes Hill, Matt Bomer, and Cameron Diaz. The film was released on Apple TV on April 10, 2026, to negative reviews from critics.

== Plot ==
Reef Hawk is an A-list actor, "the most-liked actor in Hollywood," who has returned from a five-year break during which he struggled to become sober from heroin addiction. He is ready to re-enter his decades-long career, which began in his childhood, when he receives a call from his crisis lawyer Ira Slitz. Ira reveals that someone is extorting Reef with a damaging video. Reef has no idea what the video contains, but learns to his surprise that he is not universally loved no matter how many Google articles say otherwise, and he has made countless enemies over the years. He sets out to make amends with those from whom he is estranged, including his mother, his first manager, his two closest friends, and dozens of others. In the process he must see himself as these others describe him, and he ultimately comes to terms with his imperfect life as it has evolved in the absurd, often bizarre, regularly hilarious world of the movie business.

== Cast ==
- Keanu Reeves as Reef Hawk, a damaged Hollywood star who must look into his past to confront demons and make amends after he is extorted with a mysterious video clip
- Jonah Hill as Ira Slitz, Hawk's crisis lawyer who informs him of the extortion and works to solve it
- Cameron Diaz as Kyle, one of Reef's best friends
- Matt Bomer as Xander, one of Reef's best friends
- Cary Christopher as Skylar William Woods
- David Spade as Buddy, Reef's neighbor
- Laverne Cox as Virginia Allen Green, part of Ira's crisis team
- Kaia Gerber as Oksana
- Roy Wood Jr. as Reverend Leondrus Carter, part of Ira's crisis team
- Susan Lucci as Dinah Hawk, Reef's mother, a reality TV star
- Atsuko Okatsuka as Unis Kim, part of Ira's crisis team
- Martin Scorsese as Richie "Red" Rodriguez, a washed-up agent for young actors
- Welker White as Savannah
- Ivy Wolk as Sammy, Reef's unimpressed assistant
- Drew Barrymore as herself
- Van Jones as himself

== Production ==
It was announced in April 2023 that Apple TV+ had acquired the film, directed by and co-starring Jonah Hill, with Keanu Reeves in negotiations to star alongside him. Hill also co-wrote the screenplay with Ezra Woods. In January 2024, Reeves was confirmed to star in the film, with principal photography scheduled to begin in March 2024 in Los Angeles, and expected to wrap in May. Nick Houy served as an editor for the film. In March, Cameron Diaz was said to be in advanced talks to join the film in an undisclosed starring role; days later, Diaz was confirmed to have signed on, with Matt Bomer also joining in another undisclosed role. The film marks the first time Reeves and Diaz have appeared in a film together since Feeling Minnesota in 1996.

Principal photography began on March 20, 2024, shortly after the production of Reeves and Aziz Ansari's film Good Fortune. In April, Susan Lucci, David Spade, Laverne Cox, Kaia Gerber, Roy Wood Jr. and Atsuko Okatsuka were added to the cast. Cox revealed her role as Virginia in September, and revealed her involvement with Reeves in "one big scene", likening it to "a one-act play within the film". In January 2026, Cary Christopher revealed he was a part of the cast.

== Release ==
Outcome was released by Apple TV on April 10, 2026.

== Reception ==
On the review aggregator website Rotten Tomatoes, 27% of 73 critics' reviews are positive, with an average rating of 4.5/10. The website's consensus reads: "Outcome collapses under its own ambitions, playing as a garish, tonally erratic and heavy-handed satire that fumbles its intriguing ideas about stardom in an overlong and largely unfunny jumble of wasted talent." Metacritic, which uses a weighted average, assigned the film a score of 37 out of 100, based on 20 critics, indicating "generally unfavorable" reviews.

Ian Freer of Empire gave the film 2 out of 5 stars, writing that Outcome "needed a more refined, truthful director." M.N. Miller of FandomWire wrote that Outcome "plays rough and foul," but underneath is "warm, tender, and disarmingly human."
