= Accepted (film) =

2006 American comedy film by Steve Pink

- Theatrical release poster
- Directed by: Steve Pink
- Screenplay by: Adam Cooper; Bill Collage; Mark Perez
- Story by: Mark Perez
- Produced by: Tom Shadyac; Michael Bostick
- Starring: Justin Long; Blake Lively; Anthony Heald; Lewis Black
- Cinematography: Matthew F. Leonetti
- Edited by: Scott Hill
- Music by: David Schommer
- Production company: Shady Acres Entertainment
- Distributed by: Universal Pictures
- Release date: August 18, 2006
- Running time: 93 minutes
- Country: United States
- Language: English
- Budget: $23 million
- Box office: $38.6 million

Accepted is a 2006 American comedy film directed by Steve Pink, marking his directorial debut. The screenplay was written by Adam Cooper, Bill Collage, and Mark Perez. The film stars Justin Long, Blake Lively, Jonah Hill, Anthony Heald and Lewis Black in lead roles.

The plot follows Bartleby Gaines (Long), a high school graduate who, after being rejected by every college he applies to, concocts a plan to create a fake university with his friends to convince his parents he's moving forward with his education. As more students, also rejected from other schools, mistakenly apply to the fictional South Harmon Institute of Technology (S.H.I.T.), Bartleby and his friends decide to run the school as if it were a real institution.

The film was released by Universal Pictures on August 18, 2006, and received mixed reviews from critics while grossing $38.6 million against a $23 million budget.

== Plot ==
Bartleby Gaines is a strongly persuasive high school senior in Wickliffe, Ohio. His gifts do not extend to his grades, however, and Bartleby receives rejection letters from all the colleges to which he applies, including those with high acceptance rates.

To gain approval from his father, Bartleby creates a fake college, the South Harmon Institute of Technology (S.H.I.T.), and is joined by Rory Thayer, who only applied to Yale University and was rejected due to legacy preferences; Darryl "Hands" Holloway, who lost his athletic scholarship after an injury; and Glen, an outcast who received a 0 on his SAT due to not signing his name.

To make the "college" seem legitimate to his father, Bartleby convinces his best friend, Sherman Schrader III, who has been accepted into his father's prestigious alma mater, Harmon College, to aid him by building a website. The two also hire Sherman's cynical uncle and a former philosophy professor at Harmon College, Dr. Ben Lewis, to pose as Dean. They then lease an abandoned psychiatric hospital near Harmon College and superficially renovate it to resemble a college campus. Their plan initially fools Bartleby's and his friends' parents, but backfires when the website automatically enrolls other applicants.

Bartleby lets them believe the school is real and that they will finally be accepted, despite objections from his friends. After a visit to Harmon disenchants him with traditional college life, he decides to let the students create their own curriculum. This ranges from traditional topics of study like culinary arts and woodcarving to more unusual courses such as meditation, skateboarding, and even psychokinesis.

Meanwhile, Richard Van Horne, the Dean of Harmon College, plans to tear down old and unused buildings on and near campus to construct a park-like walkway similar to Yale's and Harvard's, hoping to make Harmon look more prestigious. Van Horne dispatches Harmon's student body president Hoyt Ambrose to buy up the nearby properties, but Bartleby refuses to relinquish his lease, becoming an obstacle to Van Horne's ambitions.

The conflict escalates when Monica Moreland, Bartleby's high school crush, leaves Hoyt over his infidelity, bringing her closer to Bartleby. She begins frequently visiting Bartleby at South Harmon, eventually deciding to transfer and start a relationship with him.

Meanwhile, Schrader attempts to join Hoyt’s fraternity. After discovering Sherman at a South Harmon party, the fraternity forcibly coerces him into revealing South Harmon as a sham. Hoyt uses the information to contact all the students' parents, and Van Horne exposes South Harmon as a fake institution. The school is forced to close, and Bartleby is at risk of prison time for fraud. Having witnessed the systemic corruption at Harmon College firsthand, Sherman files for accreditation with the Ohio Department of Education, granting Bartleby one final opportunity to defend South Harmon.

At the subsequent hearing, Bartleby's attempts to meet the board's standards for accreditation frequently fall flat and prove that their unconventional curriculum and student services are lacking. Believing himself doomed, Bartleby delivers a speech condemning the failures of conventional education; instead, he champions the pursuit of knowledge and personal growth driven by individual passion, while urging the creation of innovative learning styles to help students succeed. The board grants a one-year probationary accreditation, giving South Harmon a chance to prove its viability.

Following extensive campus renovations, South Harmon Institute of Technology reopens with a wave of new students, including Sherman and Monica. Under Ben's leadership, the institute appointed certified instructors to help student teachers meet the accreditation board's strict oversight mandate for alternative education. Ultimately, Bartleby’s educational and administrative achievements finally earn him the deep respect of his family, especially his father. In the film's final scene, Van Horne's car spontaneously explodes due to an eccentric student having learned psychokinesis.

== Cast ==
- Justin Long as Bartleby Gaines, a high school graduate who is rejected by various colleges and creates a college for fellow rejects
- Jonah Hill as Sherman Schrader III, Bartleby's friend who gets into Harmon and a legacy for the BKE Fraternity
- Blake Lively as Monica Moreland, Bartleby's high school crush who is dating Hoyt
- Columbus Short as Darryl "Hands" Holloway, a football star with a talent for sculpting who lost his sports scholarship after an injury and joins Bartleby's college
- Maria Thayer as Rory Thayer, an honor student with a proclivity for meditation tired of living a rigidly structured life, who failed to get into Yale and joins Bartleby's college
- Anthony Heald as Richard Van Horne, the corrupt dean of Harmon
- Lewis Black as Dr. Ben Lewis, a jaded former Harmon professor and Sherman's uncle, whom Bartleby hires to be the Dean of his college
- Adam Herschman as Glen, an underperforming outcast who joins Bartleby's college and is obsessed with cooking unusual yet delicious foods
- Travis Van Winkle as Hoyt Ambrose, arch-rival of Bartleby, head of the BKE Fraternity and Student Body President at Harmon and Monica's boyfriend
- Diora Baird as Kiki, a former stripper rejectee who was accepted into Bartleby's College and runs the school's clothing line
- Ann Cusack as Diane Gaines, Bartleby's mother
- Mark Derwin as Jack Gaines, Bartleby's father
- Robin Lord Taylor as Abernathy Darwin Dunlap, an anxious, ADD-stricken outcast who eagerly applies to Bartleby's college
- Kellan Lutz as Dwayne, a Fraternity brother at Harmon's BKE
- Brendan Miller as Wayne, a Fraternity brother at Harmon's BKE
- Hannah Marks as Lizzie Gaines, Bartleby's little sister
- Joe Hursley as Maurice, an aspiring rock musician
  - Hursley's real-life band, The Ringers, portray Maurice's bandmates
- Jeremy Howard as Freaky Student, an eccentric student who wants to learn how to cause psychokinetic explosions
- Kaitlin Doubleday as Gwynn, Hoyt's rebound girl
- Ross Patterson as Mike McNaughton
- Artie Baxter as Mike Chambers
- Ray Santiago as Princeton boy
- Greg Sestero as a frat boy (uncredited)
- Ned Schmidtke as Dr. J. Alexander
- Jim O'Heir as Sherman Schrader II, Sherman's father
- Darcy Shean as Mrs. Schrader, Sherman's mother and Dr. Lewis's sister

== Release ==
Accepted debuted at #5 at the U.S. box office, grossing $10,023,835 during its opening weekend, trailing behind Snakes on a Plane, Talladega Nights: The Ballad of Ricky Bobby (in its third weekend), World Trade Center (in its second weekend), and Step Up (in its second weekend).

By the end of its theatrical run on October 19, 2006, the film had grossed $36,323,505 domestically and $2,181,504 internationally, resulting in a worldwide total of $38,505,009.

== Reception ==
On Rotten Tomatoes, Accepted holds an approval rating of 38% based on 115 reviews, with an average rating of 5.2/10. The critical consensus reads: "Like its characters who aren't able to meet their potential, Accepted's inconsistent and ridiculous plot gets annoying, despite a few laughs." On Metacritic, the film has a weighted average score of 47 out of 100, based on 27 critics, indicating "mixed or average reviews." However, audiences were more favorable toward the film, with CinemaScore giving it a grade of "A−" on an A+ to F scale.

Michael Buening from AllMovie rated it 3 out of 5 stars, acknowledging its humor and charm despite its flaws.

== Home media ==
Accepted was released on DVD on November 14, 2006, available in both widescreen and fullscreen formats. The DVD included special features such as deleted scenes and a gag reel. Additionally, it was released in the now-discontinued HD DVD format. A Blu-ray version of the film was later released on January 19, 2021.

== See also ==
- Camp Nowhere – 1994 film by Jonathan Prince
- F.A.L.T.U – 2011 Indian film by Remo D'Souza
