= War Dogs (2016 film) =

Film by Todd Phillips

- Theatrical release poster, parodying the Scarface poster
- Directed by: Todd Phillips
- Screenplay by: Stephen Chin; Todd Phillips; Jason Smilovic
- Based on: "Arms and the Dudes" by Guy Lawson
- Produced by: Mark Gordon; Todd Phillips; Bradley Cooper
- Starring: Jonah Hill; Miles Teller; Ana de Armas; Bradley Cooper
- Cinematography: Lawrence Sher
- Edited by: Jeff Groth
- Music by: Cliff Martinez
- Production companies: RatPac-Dune Entertainment; Joint Effort; The Mark Gordon Company
- Distributed by: Warner Bros. Pictures
- Release dates: August 3, 2016 (New York City); August 19, 2016 (United States)
- Running time: 114 minutes
- Country: United States
- Language: English
- Budget: $40 million
- Box office: $86.4 million

War Dogs is a 2016 American dark comedy crime film directed by Todd Phillips, and written by Phillips, Jason Smilovic and Stephen Chin, based on the 2011 Rolling Stone article "Arms and the Dudes" by Guy Lawson (which was later expanded into a book, also titled Arms and the Dudes). It stars Jonah Hill, Miles Teller, Ana de Armas, and Bradley Cooper, who also produced. The film follows two arms dealers, Efraim Diveroli and David Packouz, who receive a U.S. Army contract to supply ammunitions for the Afghan National Army worth approximately $300 million.

The film, which features an unreliable narrator and is labeled as being "based on a true story", is heavily fictionalized and dramatized, with some of its events, such as the duo driving through Iraq, either invented or based on other events, such as Chin's own experiences. Diveroli initially claimed that the film was falsely marketed as a true story and stole material from his 2016 memoir, Once a Gun Runner, though he later retracted his claim.

Filming began on March 2, 2015, in Romania. The film premiered in New York City on August 3, 2016, and was theatrically released by Warner Bros. Pictures on August 19, 2016. It received mixed reviews from critics and grossed over $86 million worldwide. Hill received a Golden Globe nomination for his performance.

== Plot ==
In 2005, David Packouz, a massage therapist living in Miami, Florida with his girlfriend Iz, spends his life savings on an unsuccessful venture to sell bedsheets to retirement homes. David runs into his old friend Efraim Diveroli, whose company, AEY Inc., sells arms to the US government for the war in Iraq. Efraim explains that all military equipment contracts up for bidding are posted on a public website, and he bids on small orders that, although ignored by larger contractors, are still worth millions of dollars.

After Iz informs David she is pregnant, Efraim offers him a job at AEY. David accepts, but he lies to Iz, telling her they will be selling sheets to the military; when she later learns the truth, she tells him she understands what he is doing, but insists that he stop lying to her. Efraim gives David a crash course on arms dealing and introduces him to his silent partner, businessman Ralph Slutsky, who funds AEY’s deals under the false belief that the company only sells arms to protect Israel.

David and Efraim land a contract to provide 5,000 Beretta pistols to the Iraqi police, but they have to circumvent an Italian embargo by sending the shipment to Baghdad through Jordan, where it is seized by customs. If they fail to deliver the pistols, AEY will be blacklisted from future contracts. They fly to Jordan, bribe local officials to release the shipment, and, with a smuggler, take it into Iraq themselves by truck. They are paid handsomely for driving it through the “Triangle of Death”. David again lies to Iz, telling her he was in Jordan the whole time.

AEY expands its operations and David's daughter Ella is born, while Efraim grows more unstable and untrustworthy.

The company has a chance at a contract to supply 100 million rounds of AK-47 ammunition to the Afghan military at a time when this ammunition is in short supply. At a convention, David and Efraim encounter arms dealer Henry Girard, who has sole access to massive stocks of unused Soviet-era weapons in Albania that the Albanians are required by NATO to liquidate. Barred from dealing directly with the US due to being put on a terrorist watchlist, Girard proposes to sell AEY the ammunition it needs. Before agreeing to this partnership, David and Efraim travel to Albania to see the stock for themselves, where Efraim even fires an AK-47 to check the ammunition. AEY wins the contract, although David and Efraim learn to their dismay that they underbid their competitors by $53 million.

Before David leaves for eight weeks in Albania to supervise the loading of the ammunition, Iz, who is fed up with David lying to her, leaves him to stay at her mother's with Ella.

In Albania, David discovers the ammunition is actually Chinese-made and thus illegal under a US embargo, so Efraim has it repackaged to mask its origin. On learning Henry has charged them a 400% markup, Efraim decides, despite David’s protests, to cut Henry out of the deal. Henry retaliates by having David kidnapped, beaten, and threatened at gunpoint, leading David to return to Miami to confront Efraim. As David is about to leave, Enver, the Albanian handling the repackaging, tells him he has been paid nothing; David promises Enver to get his money wired to him from Miami.

On returning to Miami, David quits AEY and demands compensation for his work on the Afghan deal, but Efraim refuses to pay him anything. David returns to working as a massage therapist and convinces Iz to move back in with him after telling her the truth about AEY. Three months later, Efraim, with Ralph serving as a mediator, offers David a paltry severance package; David tells Ralph what they have been doing, unaware that Ralph is wearing a listening device for the FBI. They have been denounced by Enver, who was never paid.

David and Efraim are arrested. Efraim is sentenced to four years in prison, while David pleads guilty and is sentenced to seven months of house arrest.

Some time later, Henry contacts David and apologizes for abducting him in Albania; he also thanks David for not mentioning him in his testimony and offers him a briefcase full of money he made from the Afghan deal.

== Cast ==
- Jonah Hill as Efraim Diveroli
- Miles Teller as David Packouz
- Ana de Armas as Iz
- Bradley Cooper as Henry Girard (based on Heinrich Thomet)
- Kevin Pollak as Ralph Slutzky
- Patrick St. Esprit as Captain Phillip Santos
- Shaun Toub as Marlboro
- JB Blanc as Bashkim
- Gabriel Spahiu as Enver
- Barry Livingston as Army Bureaucrat
- Eddie Jemison as Hilldale Home Manager
- David Packouz as Hilldale Home guitar singer (uncredited)

== Production ==
Initially, Jesse Eisenberg and Shia LaBeouf were set to star in the film; however, Jonah Hill and Miles Teller were eventually cast. Further casting was announced in early 2015, with Ana de Armas joining in February, and JB Blanc joining in March. Screenwriter Stephen Chin based many of the incidents on his own experiences in Iraq.

Shooting was initially set to begin late April 2015, in Miami, for several weeks. According to SSN Insider, filming began on March 2, 2015. Later confirmed by the Business Wire on March 17, 2015, filming was underway in Romania. On April 29, 2015, Hill and Teller were spotted filming on the set in Burbank, California.

== Release ==
Warner Bros. Pictures originally set the film for a release on March 11, 2016. In November 2015, the release date was moved to August 19, 2016.

=== Box office ===
War Dogs grossed $43 million in North America and $43.4 million in other territories for a worldwide total of $86.4 million, against a budget of $40 million.

In the United States and Canada, War Dogs was released on August 19, 2016, alongside Ben-Hur and Kubo and the Two Strings, and was projected to gross $12–15 million from 3,100 theaters in its opening weekend. The film made $1.3 million from its Thursday night previews and $5.5 million on its first day (including previews). It went on to gross $14.3 million in its opening weekend, finishing third at the box office and first among new releases.

=== Critical response ===
War Dogs received mixed reviews from critics. On Rotten Tomatoes the film has an approval rating of 62%, based on 235 reviews with an average rating of 6.00/10. The website's critical consensus reads, "War Dogs rises on the strength of Jonah Hill's compelling performance to take a lightly entertaining look at troubling real-world events." On Metacritic, the film has a score of 57 out of 100, based on 41 critics, indicating "mixed or average reviews". Audiences polled by CinemaScore gave the film an average grade of "B" on an A+ to F scale.

ScreenCrush's Matt Singer said, "Superficially, the movie looks a lot like past Phillips comedies about men behaving badly, with dirty jokes and wacky hijinks galore. But War Dogs is more critical of its protagonists' behavior, and there's plenty of sad commentary about the state of modern America."

Ignatiy Vishnevetsky of The A.V. Club had misgivings about the film's slant and biographical omissions, writing: "One might quibble with the way Phillips limits responsibility on the Pentagon deal by painting AEY as better businessmen than they actually were [...], while avoiding the darker sides of the story..." Matt Zoller Seitz of RogerEbert.com gave the film two out of four stars, stating: "War Dogs is a film about horrible people that refuses to own the horribleness."

== See also ==
- 2008 Gërdec explosions
- Lord of War (2005): semi-biographical film about an international arms dealer.
