= Miles Teller =

American actor (born 1987)

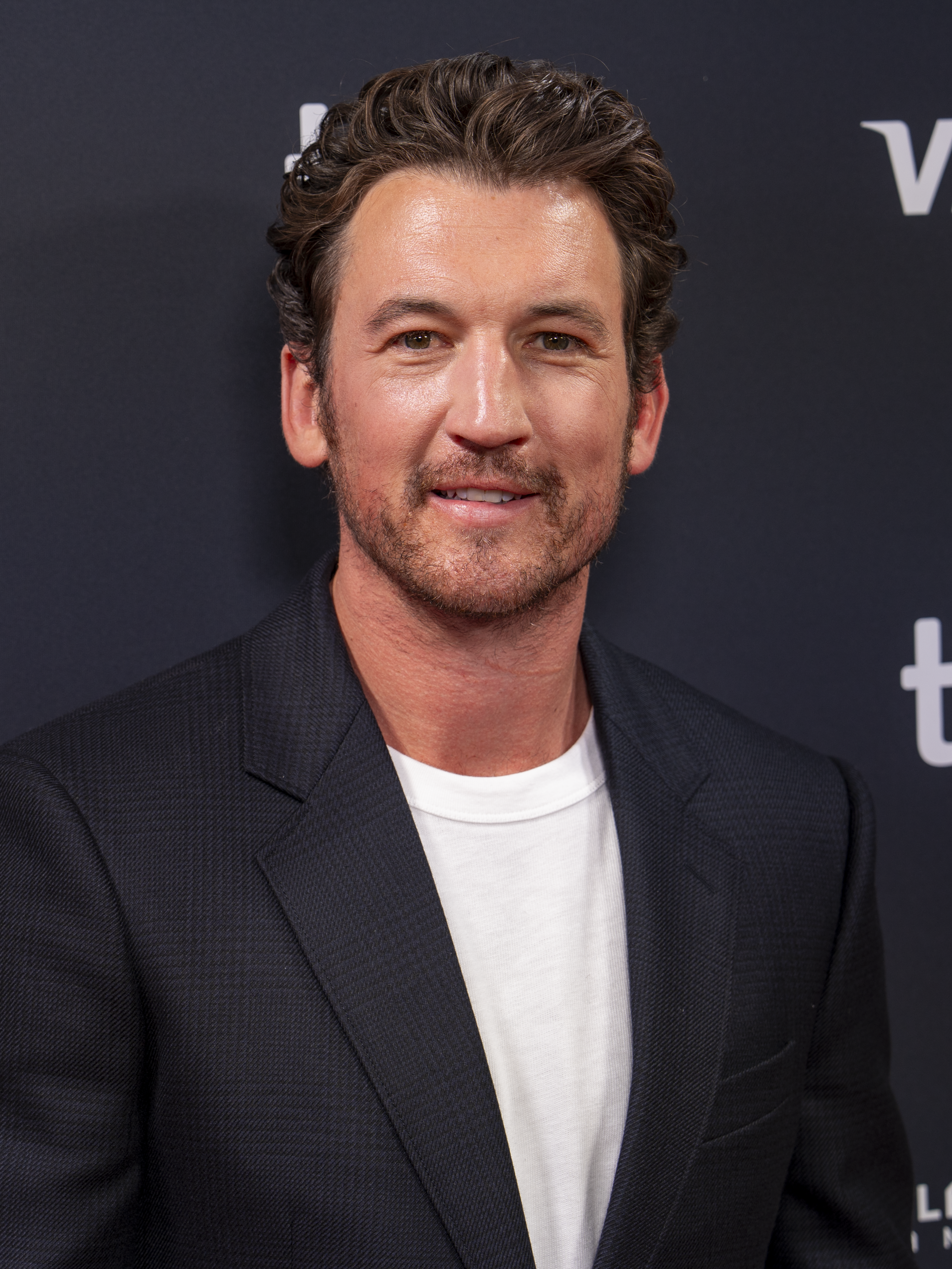
- Teller at the 2025 Toronto International Film Festival
- Born: February 20, 1987 (age 39); Downingtown, Pennsylvania, U.S.
- Education: New York University (BFA)
- Occupation: Actor
- Years active: 2004–present
- Spouse: Keleigh Sperry (m. 2019)

Miles Teller (born February 20, 1987) is an American actor. He made his feature film debut with the independent drama Rabbit Hole (2010), and gained wider recognition for his roles in the coming-of-age film The Spectacular Now (2013) and the Divergent film trilogy (2014–2016). His breakthrough role came in the drama Whiplash (2014), which earned him critical acclaim, and led him to garner a nomination for the BAFTA Rising Star Award.

Teller went on to star in the superhero film Fantastic Four (2015) as Mister Fantastic and in the biographical film War Dogs (2016). He garnered a mainstream resurgence for his starring role in the action film Top Gun: Maverick (2022). On television, he has starred in the Amazon Prime Video crime drama Too Old to Die Young (2019), the Paramount+ miniseries The Offer (2022), and the Apple TV+ film The Gorge (2025). As a co-producer of the latter, he was nominated for the Primetime Emmy Award for Outstanding Television Movie.

== Early life ==
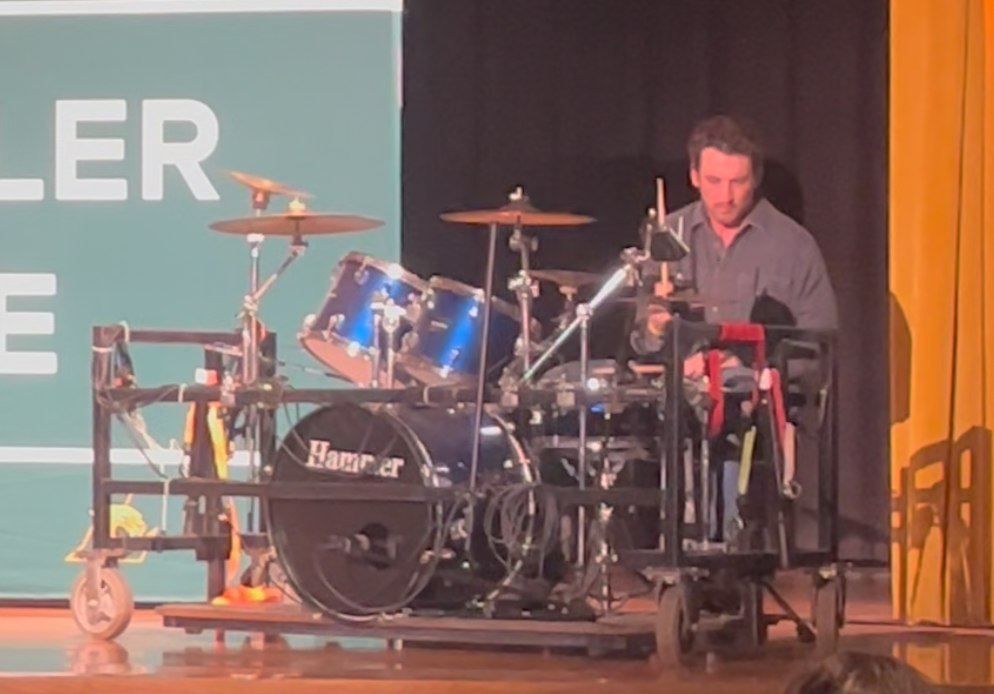
Teller playing drums at his former high school

Teller was born in Downingtown, Pennsylvania, on February 20, 1987. His mother, Merry, is a real estate agent, and his father, Michael, is a nuclear power plant engineer. He has two older sisters, Erin and Dana. His paternal grandfather was of Russian Jewish descent, and his ancestry also includes English, Irish and African-American forebears.

Teller spent his early years in Pennsylvania and Delaware before his family moved to Citrus County, Florida, when he was 12. Growing up, he was involved with acting, was president of his high school's drama club, and played also saxophone, drums, piano and guitar. He also played baseball and had dreams of turning professional. He graduated from Lecanto High School in Lecanto, Florida. Subsequently, he attended the New York University Tisch School of the Arts; there, he studied method acting at the Lee Strasberg Theatre and Film Institute and screen acting with Stonestreet Studios. He earned a BFA in drama in 2009.

In 2007, Teller was a passenger in a car that lost control at 80 mph (130 km/h) and flipped eight times. He has multiple scars on his face from the crash.

== Career ==
=== Early work and breakthrough (2004–2021) ===
Teller appeared in many short films between 2004 and 2010. After graduating from Tisch School of the Arts in 2009, he made his major film debut in Rabbit Hole (2010), after Nicole Kidman handpicked him for the role. Teller starred in the stage musical Footloose in high school, and later appeared in the 2011 remake film of the same name. In 2013, he starred in 21 & Over and The Spectacular Now, opposite Shailene Woodley.

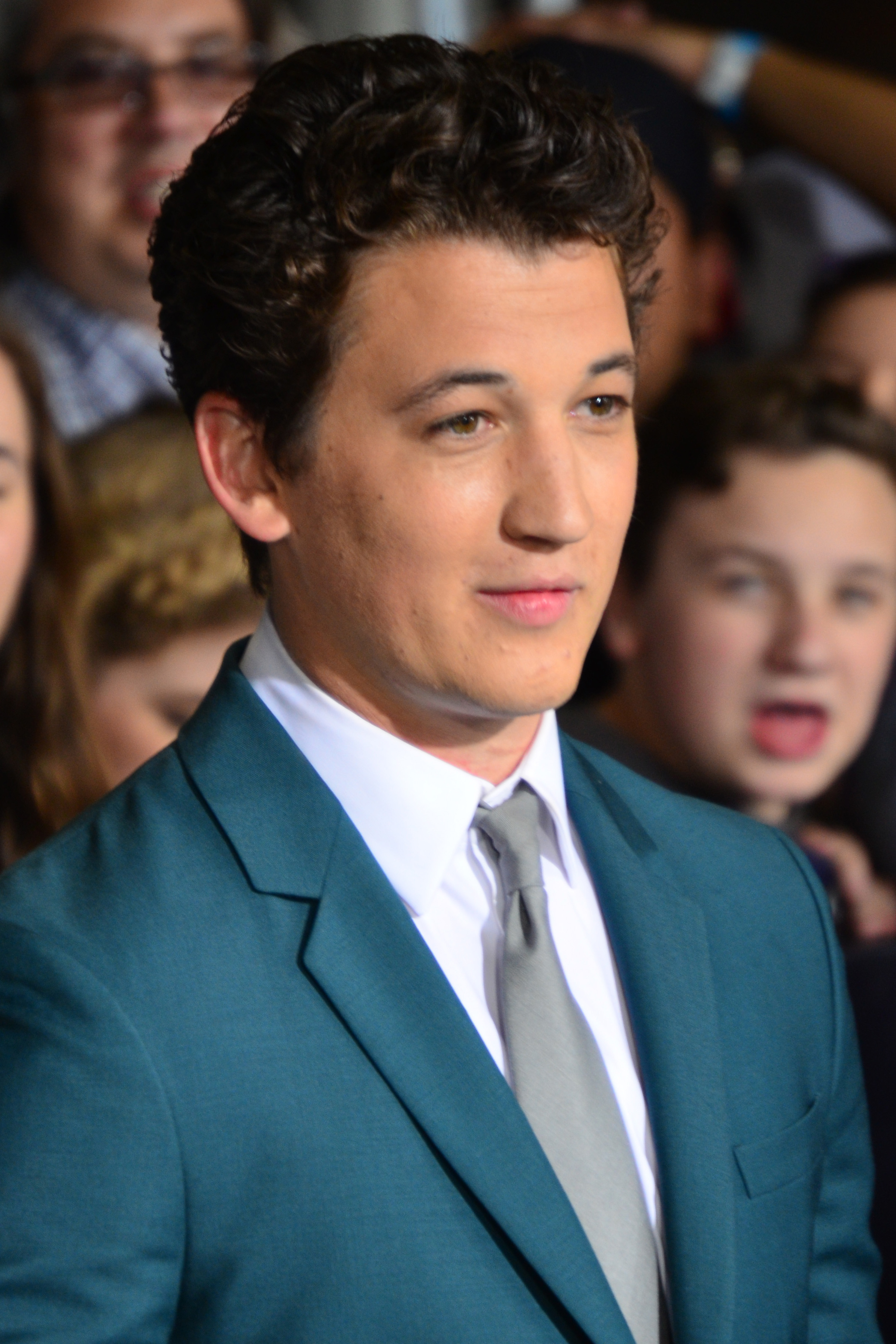
Teller at the film premiere of Divergent in 2014

In Damien Chazelle's second film Whiplash (2014), Teller played a drummer who tries to impress his abusive jazz teacher (J. K. Simmons), which earned him nominations for the Gotham Independent Film Award for Best Actor, the Satellite Award for Best Actor – Motion Picture and the BAFTA Rising Star Award. Despite the acclaim that the film received and the intensity of his prep time, Teller said in an interview in 2015 that after taxes he "made like $8,000" for the movie.

Teller received further recognition for playing Peter Hayes in Divergent (2014), and the film's sequels, Insurgent (2015) and Allegiant (2016). He has also played Mister Fantastic in the reboot film Fantastic Four (2015) and arms dealer David Packouz in War Dogs (2016). He trained for 5 months to get in shape for the role of biopic boxer Vinny Paz in film Bleed for This (2016).

In 2017, he starred in two biopic films, Only the Brave and Thank You for Your Service. In November 2020, it was announced that Teller would star in a political satire called The Fence. In September 2021, it was reported that filming on The Offer, the Paramount+ miniseries about the production of the film The Godfather in which Teller plays producer Albert S. Ruddy, was temporarily halted due to COVID concerns. The miniseries aired from April to June 2022. In November 2021, he appeared in Taylor Swift's music video "I Bet You Think About Me" directed by Blake Lively.

=== Top Gun: Maverick and beyond (2022–present) ===
Teller at the 2026 New York Film Festival

In 2022, he starred in Top Gun: Maverick. He was initially hesitant to accept the role, as he was wary of the potential success and attention he would receive from starring in a major film alongside Tom Cruise. He was convinced to accept it by Cruise himself, who persuaded him that he was perfect for the role. In May 2022, Teller stated that he had been pitching a follow-up film centered around his character to the studio. Teller referred to his pitch as Top Gun: Rooster. By July of the same year, he stated that he has been having ongoing discussions regarding a sequel with Cruise. In regard to the popularity and support, Teller said that the experience has "been awesome" and that "I've never really experienced something like this in my life."

Teller made his hosting debut on the opener of the 48th season of Saturday Night Live in 2022, and during the Super Bowl LVII telecast in 2023, Teller, his wife, and their dog starred in a commercial for Bud Light in which they pass the time while waiting for a customer service representative to speak to them, dancing to the on-hold music.

== Personal life ==
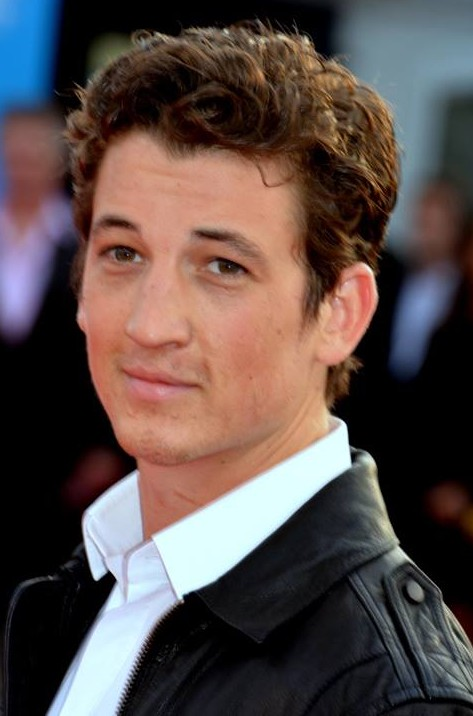
Teller in 2014

Teller became engaged to model Keleigh Sperry at the Molori Safari Lodge in the Madikwe Game Reserve, South Africa, on August 20, 2017. They married on September 1, 2019, in Maui, Hawaii. In 2025, their home was destroyed by the Palisades Fire. Later that year, Teller visited Lecanto High School to inspire and answer questions by students, and the school named their theater the "Miles Teller Theatre".

On top of his work as an actor, Teller has also expanded into business ventures and became an early investor in The Finnish Long Drink. In April 2026, the company was acquired in a deal valued at more than $325 million, with Teller stating that he did not plan on retiring from acting despite his success as a businessman.

== Filmography ==
=== Film ===
Year	Title	Role	Notes
2010	Rabbit Hole	Jason	Debut film
2011	Footloose	Willard Hewitt	
2012	Project X	Himself	credited as "Miles"
2013	The Spectacular Now	Sutter Keely	
2013	21 & Over	Miller	
2014	Whiplash	Andrew Neiman	
2014	That Awkward Moment	Daniel	
2014	Divergent	Peter Hayes	
2014	Two Night Stand	Alec	
2015	The Divergent Series: Insurgent	Peter Hayes	
2015	Fantastic Four	Reed Richards / Mister Fantastic	
2016	The Divergent Series: Allegiant	Peter Hayes	
2016	Get a Job	Will Davis	
2016	War Dogs	David Packouz	
2016	Bleed for This	Vinny Pazienza	
2017	Only the Brave	Brendan "Donut" McDonough	
2017	Thank You for Your Service	Adam Schumann	
2022	Top Gun: Maverick	Lt. Bradley "Rooster" Bradshaw	
2022	Spiderhead	Jeff	
2025	The Gorge	Levi	Also executive producer
2025	Eternity	Larry Cutler	Also executive producer
2026	Michael	John Branca	
2026	Paper Tiger	Irwin Pearl	
TBA	The Ark and the Aardvark †	Gilbert (voice)	In production
TBA	Copperhead	—N/a	In production

Key
†	Denotes films that have not yet been released

=== Television ===
Year	Title	Role	Notes
2009	The Unusuals	James Boorland	Episode: "Boorland Day"
2019	Too Old to Die Young	Martin Jones	Miniseries, 10 episodes
2022	The Offer	Albert S. Ruddy	Miniseries, 10 episodes; also executive producer
2022	Saturday Night Live	Himself (host)	Episode: "Miles Teller/Kendrick Lamar"
2025	Saturday Night Live	Himself (host)	Episode: "Miles Teller/Brandi Carlile"

=== Video games ===
Year	Title	Role	Notes
2026	Battlefield 6	Bradley "Rooster" Bradshaw	Top Gun cross-over event

=== Music videos ===
Year	Title	Role	Artist
2021	"I Bet You Think About Me"	Groom	Taylor Swift featuring Chris Stapleton

== Awards and nominations ==
Year	Award	Category	Work	Result
2011	Chlotrudis Awards	Best Supporting Actor	Rabbit Hole	Nominated
2013	Alliance of Women Film Journalists	Best Depiction of Nudity, Sexuality, or Seduction	The Spectacular Now	Nominated
2013	Indiana Film Journalists Association	Best Actor	The Spectacular Now	Nominated
2013	Napa Valley Film Festival	Rising Star Award (Shared with Dianna Agron)	Himself	Won
2013	Sundance Film Festival	Special Jury Prize for Dramatic Acting (Shared with Shailene Woodley)	The Spectacular Now	Won
2014	British Academy Film Awards	Rising Star Award	Whiplash	Nominated
2014	Chlotrudis Awards	Best Actor	The Spectacular Now	Nominated
2014	Georgia Film Critics Association	Breakthrough Award	21 & Over and The Spectacular Now	Nominated
2014	Golden Schmoes Awards	Breakthrough Performance of the Year	Whiplash	Nominated
2014	Gotham Independent Film Awards	Best Actor	Whiplash	Nominated
2014	MTV Movie Awards	Best Kiss (Shared with Shailene Woodley)	The Spectacular Now	Nominated
2014	MTV Movie Awards	Best Breakthrough Performance	The Spectacular Now	Nominated
2014	Satellite Awards	Best Actor	Whiplash	Nominated
2014	Young Hollywood Awards	Best Threesome	That Awkward Moment (shared with Zac Efron and Michael B. Jordan)	Nominated
2015	Chlotrudis Awards	Best Actor	Whiplash	Nominated
2015	CinemaCon Awards	Ensemble Award (Shared with Kate Mara, Michael B. Jordan, and Jamie Bell)	Fantastic Four	Won
2015	MTV Movie Awards	Best Male Performance	Whiplash	Nominated
2015	MTV Movie Awards	#WTF Moment	Whiplash	Nominated
2015	MTV Movie Awards	Best Musical Moment	Whiplash	Nominated
2015	Teen Choice Awards	Choice Movie Scene Stealer	The Divergent Series: Insurgent	Nominated
2016	Golden Raspberry Awards	Worst Screen Combo (Shared with Kate Mara, Michael B. Jordan, and Jamie Bell)	Fantastic Four	Nominated
2016	Indiana Film Journalists Association	Best Actor	Bleed for This	Nominated
2016	Teen Choice Awards	Choice Movie Scene Stealer	The Divergent Series: Allegiant	Nominated
2022	Hollywood Critics Association Midseason Film Awards	Best Supporting Actor	Top Gun: Maverick	Nominated
2022	People's Choice Awards	The Male Movie Star of 2022	Top Gun: Maverick	Nominated
2023	MTV Movie & TV Awards	Best Duo (Shared with Tom Cruise)	Top Gun: Maverick	Nominated
2025	Astra TV Awards	Best Actor in a Limited Series or TV Movie	The Gorge	Nominated
2025	Critics' Choice Super Awards	Best Actor in a Science Fiction/Fantasy Movie	The Gorge	Nominated
2025	Primetime Emmy Awards	Outstanding Television Movie (as Executive Producer)	The Gorge	Nominated
2025	Savannah Film Festival	Distinguished Performance Award	Eternity	Won
