= Catching the Wolf of Wall Street =

2009 book by Jordan Belfort

- Hardcover edition
- Author: Jordan Belfort
- Language: English
- Genre: Non-fiction
- Publisher: Bantam Books
- Publication date: February 24, 2009
- Publication place: United States
- Media type: Print, e-book, audiobook
- Pages: 480 pp.
- ISBN: 978-0553807042
- Preceded by: The Wolf of Wall Street

Catching the Wolf of Wall Street: More Incredible True Stories of Fortunes, Schemes, Parties, and Prison is the second non-fiction book by former stockbroker and trader Jordan Belfort. The text was initially published on February 24, 2009, by Bantam Books.

== Overview ==
Belfort's first book was titled The Wolf of Wall Street, and his rise and fall in the financial world. This second memoir describes Belfort's life and events after his arrest. The sale of the rights to cinematize these two books is estimated to have earned Belfort some $2 million.

== Similar books ==
- Great Salad Oil Swindle by Norman Charles Miller
- Octopus by Guy Lawson
- Rogue Trader by Nick Leeson
