= The Wolf of Wall Street (book) =

2007 memoir by Jordan Belfort

- Hardcover edition
- Author: Jordan Belfort
- Language: English
- Genre: Non-fiction
- Publisher: Bantam Books
- Publication date: September 25, 2007
- Publication place: United States
- Media type: Print, e-book, audiobook
- Pages: 528 pp.
- ISBN: 978-0553805468
- Followed by: Catching the Wolf of Wall Street

The Wolf of Wall Street is a memoir by former stockbroker and trader Jordan Belfort, first published in September 2007 by Bantam Books, then adapted into a 2013 film of the same name (directed by Martin Scorsese and starring Leonardo DiCaprio as Belfort). Belfort's autobiographical account was continued by Catching the Wolf of Wall Street, published in 2009.

Belfort tells his real-life story of creating Stratton Oakmont, a brokerage house engaged in pump and dump schemes with penny stocks. The firm was shut down by regulators in the late 1990s, and Belfort was subsequently jailed for securities fraud.

== Reception ==
A reviewer of Publishers Weekly stated "The book's main topic is the vast amount of drugs and risky physical behavior Belfort engaged in in order to survive. As might be expected in the autobiography of a veteran con man with movie rights already sold, it's hard to know how much to believe. The story is told mostly in dialogue, with allegedly contemporaneous mental asides by the author, reported verbatim. But it reports only surface events, never revealing what motivates Belfort or any of the other characters". A reviewer of Kirkus Reviews added "It is crass, certainly, and vulgar—and a hell of a read. Belfort displays dirty writing skills many basis points above his tricky ilk. His chronicle ends with his arrest for fraud. Now, with 22 months in the slammer behind him, he’s working on his next book. Entertaining as pulp fiction, real as a federal indictment".

== See also ==
- Boiler room
- Boiler Room
- Great Salad Oil Swindle by Norman Charles Miller
- Octopus by Guy Lawson
- Microcap stock fraud
- Rogue Trader by Nick Leeson
