= Tino De Angelis =

American commodities trader (1915–2009)

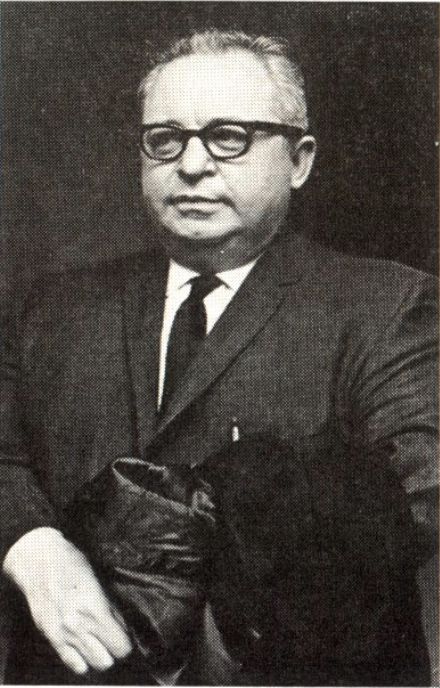
- Born: Anthony De Angelis; November 3, 1915; New York City, New York, U.S.
- Died: September 26, 2009 (aged 93); Eustis, Florida, U.S.
- Occupation: Commodities trader
- Employer: Allied Crude Vegetable Oil Company
- Convictions: Fraud, conspiracy
- Penalty: 7 years imprisonment (1964)

Anthony "Tino" De Angelis (November 3, 1915 – September 26, 2009) was an American commodities trader and convicted fraudster who dealt in vegetable oil futures worldwide.

In 1962 De Angelis's company, Allied Crude Vegetable Oil Refining Corporation, bilked 51 banks out of over $180 million ($1.89 billion today) in what became known as the salad oil scandal after he failed to corner the soybean oil market.

== Biography ==
De Angelis was born to Italian immigrant parents in the Bronx. While still a teenager he managed about 200 employees in a meat and fish market. When he found out that the new National School Lunch Act program would buy practically any food items (given certain price requirements) he took over the Adolph Gobel Company in North Bergen, New Jersey, and was awarded a large contract; he promptly overcharged the government by $31,000. He also delivered over 2 million pounds of uninspected meat. Gobel would eventually go bankrupt.

In 1955, he formed Allied Crude Vegetable Oil Refining Corporation and other related companies to participate in the U.S. government's Food for Peace program to sell subsidized surplus food ingredients to Europe to shore up their weak post-war economies. He formed Allied in a dilapidated "tank farm" in Bayonne, New Jersey, and, with the patronage of several major grain exporters, began shipping massive quantities of substandard shortening and other vegetable oil products to Europe. De Angelis gradually became a major player in Europe and the commodities markets, later expanding into cotton and soybeans.

In 1962, De Angelis began to accumulate massive quantities of soybean oil to attempt to corner the soybean oil market. With his huge inventory as collateral, he borrowed from various Wall Street banks and companies, and used the proceeds to buy as many oil futures as possible. Soon he would be long a large quantity hoping for soon-to-be expensive oil and oil futures, as prices rose due to the market corner.

== Fraud with warehouse receipts ==
In the early 1960s American Express (Amex) was a respected name in traveler's checks and credit cards. The company created a new division to specialize in "Field Warehousing" to finance businesses using their inventory of goods and commodities as collateral. Tino De Angelis was a new customer and Amex wrote warehouse receipts for many millions of barrels of vegetable oil with him as beneficiary. The receipts would then be presented to a bank or broker and discounted for cash.

As De Angelis's stock of warehouse receipts increased, he began to replace the soybean oil in his tanks with water. Some tanks had special compartments, while others were hooked-up to a maze of pipes to shuttle oil from one tank to the next to fool inspectors.

What puzzled authorities about Amex's Field Warehousing operation was that De Angelis's soybean oil stock exceeded the stock available in the entire United States, according to the Department of Agriculture. While the warehouse operation was small, Amex was lenient with De Angelis, as he was one of their main customers. With Amex staking its reputation behind all the oil and with De Angelis offering great deals, mainstream companies such as Bunge Limited, Staley, and Procter and Gamble were soon participating. Bank of America joined in to provided collateralized loans.

== Scheme exposed ==
Inspectors were eventually tipped off by bribery attempts and delivery mistakes. They inspected Allied's tanks again and this time they found the water. A massive soybean oil futures crash ensued and wiped out the value of the loan collateral in minutes. On November 19, 1963, De Angelis's company filed for bankruptcy and investors found hundreds of millions of dollars in unaccounted funds. The financial integrity of the dealers behind De Angelis's futures trades was now in question. Traders scurried to recover their funds after the New York Stock Exchange, worried about a U.S. Securities and Exchange Commission investigation, suspended Williston and Beane and Ira Haupt and Co.'s trading privileges.

On November 22, 1963, NYSE president G. Keith Funston attempted to avert a market crash as Ira Haupt's 20,700 customers, fearing financial ruin, scrambled to sell their oil holdings before they became worthless. Because of all the trades the brokerage firm did on De Angelis's behalf, various banks were left holding the bag with over $37 million in unrecoverable loans. This rush, combined with the panic ensuing from the shooting of President Kennedy that afternoon, led to 2.6 million shares being sold and the Dow dropping 24 points (about 5%) in 27 minutes. The exchange was forced to close 83 minutes early.

U.S. Attorney for the District of New Jersey David M. Satz Jr., charged De Angelis with contempt after he found De Angelis had funneled over $500,000 from Allied into his personal account at a Swiss bank. Amex was forced to make good on their warehouse contracts and took a massive loss. The two trading firms were eventually bought by larger players. De Angelis was sentenced to a seven-year jail term. In the wake of the scandal, keen observer and investor Warren Buffett took advantage of the plunge in the price of American Express shares and bought 5% of the company for only $20 million.

De Angelis was charged with 19 counts of fraud and conspiracy for forging warehouse receipts. He pled guilty to four charges and was sentenced to 20 years, with an expected serving time of seven years.

The swindle was documented in detail by Norman C. Miller in The Great Salad Oil Swindle (Baltimore, MD: Coward McCann Books, 1965). The book is based on Miller's coverage of the story in the Wall Street Journal, which won a Pulitzer Prize in 1964.

In 1972, De Angelis was released. By 1975 he was involved in another scam, this time a Ponzi scheme involving livestock in the Midwest. De Angelis used two slaughterhouses, Rex Pork and Mister Pork, to swindle livestock dealers in Indianapolis out of $7 million (approximately $31M in 2016 dollars) worth of hogs. Two of the top livestock dealers facing losses were M&R Livestock (owned by Theodore C. McAninch) and Farrow and Co. (owned by Allan S. Farrow). De Angelis continued trading with these livestock dealers via fraudulent letters promising payment. The biggest loser, M&R Livestock, was owed $3.5 million ($21 million in 2016 dollars).
