= Donald Horowitz =

Donald Horowitz may refer to:

- Donald Horowitz (New Jersey lawyer) (born 1936), American lawyer
- Donald L. Horowitz (born 1939), professor of law and political science at Duke University
