= David Satz =

David Satz may refer to:

- David M. Satz, Jr., U.S. Attorney for the District of New Jersey from 1961 to 1969
- David Satz (musician), American musician and recording engineer, winner of 1996 Grammy for Best Historical Album, see 38th Annual Grammy Awards
