= Rogue Trader (book) =

1996 book by Nick Leeson

Rogue Trader How I Brought Down Barings Bank and Shook the Financial World
- Hardcover edition
- Author: Nick Leeson
- Language: English
- Genre: Finance
- Publisher: Little, Brown & Company
- Publication date: February 19, 1996
- Publication place: United States
- Media type: Print (Hardback)
- Pages: 274 pp.
- ISBN: 0-316-87971-1

Rogue Trader: How I Brought Down Barings Bank and Shook the Financial World is a book by Nick Leeson, who served four years in prison for fraud after bankrupting the London-based Barings Bank in 1995 by hiding $1.4 billion in debt he accumulated as a derivatives trader in Singapore. The book was released on February 19, 1996 by Little, Brown & Company.

== Film ==
The book was made into a 1999 feature film of the same name. Following an interview with Nick Leeson in prison, Sir David Frost realised the potential for a movie and optioned the rights to Leeson's story.

Written and directed by James Dearden, the film stars Ewan McGregor (Nick Leeson) and Anna Friel (Lisa Leeson) and was executive produced by Frost. Released in June 1999, it premiered in London one month prior to Leeson's release from prison in Singapore. Rogue Trader was released on June 25, 1999 in the UK and the US. It was distributed by Pathé in the UK and Cinemax in the US.

== See also ==
- Great Salad Oil Swindle
- Ugly Americans: The True Story of the Ivy League Cowboys Who Raided the Asian Markets for Millions
- The Wolf of Wall Street
- Catching the Wolf of Wall Street
