= Sam DeCavalcante =

American gangster (1913–1997)

- DeCavalcante on April 21, 1977
- Born: Simone Paul Rizzo DeCavalcante; April 30, 1913; New York City, U.S.
- Died: February 7, 1997 (aged 83); Fort Lauderdale, Florida, U.S.
- Other names: "Sam the Plumber", "The Count"
- Occupation: Crime boss
- Known for: Boss of the DeCavalcante crime family
- Predecessor: Nicholas Delmore
- Successor: Giovanni Riggi
- Spouse: Mary Abrams
- Children: 3
- Relatives: Vincent Palermo (nephew-in-law)
- Allegiance: DeCavalcante crime family
- Convictions: Extortion conspiracy (1970); overturned upon appeal (1971); Gambling conspiracy (1971)
- Penalty: 15 years' imprisonment (1970); 5 years' imprisonment and $10,000 fine (1971); served 2 years

Simone Paul Rizzo DeCavalcante (April 30, 1913 – February 7, 1997), known as "Sam the Plumber", was an Italian-American mobster who was boss of the DeCavalcante crime family of New Jersey. The McClellan hearings later named the New Jersey Mafia the DeCavalcante crime family since he was the boss of the family at the time of those hearings.

== Early life ==
The son of Italian immigrants Maria Antoinette (Occhipinti) and Frank Rizzo Di Cavalcante, Simone Paul Rizzo DeCavalcante was born in the Brooklyn borough of New York City and raised in Trenton, New Jersey. His birth date has been reported as April 30, 1913. Claiming descent from an Italian marquis, Michelangelo Cavalcanti and his wife Maria Caterina De Medici, DeCavalcante was nicknamed "The Count".

== Criminal career ==
=== New Jersey mob boss ===
After the retirement of family boss Nicholas Delmore (real name Nicholas Amoruso) between 1960 and 1964, DeCavalcante replaced him. Shortly after that, he acted as a liaison between the Mafia Commission and the Bonanno crime family after the beginning of the Bonanno War between the New York Five Families. Under DeCavalcante's leadership, the New Jersey Mafia was transformed from a dysfunctional group of ever-warring factions into a cohesive and profitable crime family. He also doubled the number of "made men" in the family. DeCavalcante altered longstanding parts of the Mafia initiation ritual, abolishing the use of a gun, a knife and a burning holy card when "making" new members of his organization as "he did not feel it was necessary", according to Vincent "Vinny Ocean" Palermo. Despite this, he insisted there was no difference between the New Jersey Mafia and the Five Families on the other side of the Hudson River and declared: "Cosa Nostra is Cosa Nostra. An Amico Nostro is an Amico Nostro". DeCavalcante oversaw illegal gambling, loansharking, and labor racketeering in New Jersey. He also had interests in lucrative pornography businesses in two states. Living in the Lawrenceville section of Lawrence Township, but working in Newark, DeCavalcante commanded an organization of around 60 "made" members active in the tri-state area of New Jersey, New York and Connecticut. The DeCavalcante crime family, as it came to be known, operated primarily in New Jersey, with interests in Connecticut, Troy, New York, and suburbs of New York City.

DeCavalcante's legal business front was the Kenilworth Plumbing and Heating Co., a plumbing supply store in Kenilworth. He and his wife Mary had three sons, Frank, Robert, and Carl. He later resided at 1015 Mercer Street in Princeton. DeCavalcante's ownership of a plumbing supplies store earned him the nickname "Sam the Plumber", although his preferred sobriquet was "The Count", which derived from his claims that he was the son of an Italian marquis. Another nickname of his was "the Claw", as he had a reputation as a usurious loan shark.

=== "DeCavalcante Papers" ===
From 1961 to 1965, DeCavalcante was the subject of a Federal Bureau of Investigation (FBI) investigation known as the "Goodfella Tapes" or the "DeCavalcante Papers". The FBI used wiretaps and bugs at four locations in New Jersey and Pennsylvania, including the office of DeCavalcante's Kenilworth plumbing supply firm, to record conversations among DeCavalcante and his associates which revealed detailed information on the day‐to‐day operations of the Mafia and crimes including labor racketeering, corruption, loansharking and murder. The other locations where electronic surveillance was utilized were the Best Sales Co., a company in Newark controlled by Gerardo Catena, the Penn Jersey Vending Co. in Philadelphia, owned by Angelo Bruno, and a building known as "the Barn", located at the rear of a restaurant on U.S. Route 22 in Mountainside. The investigation confirmed claims by cooperating witness Joe Valachi, provided crucial information on La Cosa Nostra, and revealed the existence of the Mafia Commission. One Justice Department official described the "DeCavalcante Papers" as a report just as crucial as Valachi's disclosures. During these conversations, DeCavalcante repeatedly referred to himself as the "father" (boss) of his "borgata" (crime family). However, since no court order was issued for the wiretaps, none of the tapes could be used to indict DeCavalcante.

Among the eight murders discussed by DeCavalcante and his associates were the 1951 shooting of Willie Moretti in Cliffside Park, and the 1962 hand grenade killing of Charles "Cadillac Charlie" Cavallaro in Youngstown, Ohio. In one conversation, involving DeCavalcante and three others on February 23, 1963, DeCavalcante agreed with Angelo DeCarlo that the method of Moretti's murder was distasteful. Each of the four men were also critical of the method used to assassinate Cavallaro as his 4-year-old son was also killed in the explosion. It was indicated that the use of hand grenades had since been forbidden by the Mafia. In another conversation in 1964, DeCavalcante and two others discussed methods of body disposal, with a car crusher, a garbage compactor and a device capable of turning a human corpse into a "meatball" being mentioned. In 1965, he forbade the killing of an African-American construction worker who had assaulted the son of a Mafioso with a shovel in a fight because the construction worker was a Black Muslim and DeCavalcante feared a war between the Nation of Islam and the Mafia.

In addition to murder, the tapes revealed political corruption and links between mobsters and New Jersey public officials. Days before Thomas G. Dunn was elected Mayor of Elizabeth, he visited DeCavalcante at his Kenilworth office on October 23, 1964. Dunn said to DeCavalcante: "If you have any way of getting to [two redacted names] tell them to keep their lousy mouths shut... Because this thing could cream me at the last minute. So if you can in some way get to these two guys – tell them to keep this thing out of the papers". DeCavalcante promised Dunn support in his mayoral campaign and asked: "Do you think we could get any city work?", to which Dunn laughed and replied: "Well, maybe". In a statement issued on June 10, 1969, Dunn claimed that at no point during the meeting had DeCavalcante asked him "to do anything irregular or illegal", and that he had had no contact with DeCavalcante since. He also denied that DeCavalcante had any influence over his administration and claimed that he had not been aware of DeCavalcante's underworld associations. Other public officials implicated by the tapes included Cornelius Gallagher, a member of the U.S. House of Representatives. In January 1965, DeCavalcante, along with Joseph "Bayonne Joe" Zicarelli, met with Emanuel Riggi, a reputed mafioso who the government was seeking to deport. At the meeting, Zicarelli suggested that Riggi contact Congressman Gallagher, who "if the case ever got to Washington, would be in a position to get [Riggi] a favorable ruling". Gallagher had allegedly been connected with the Mafia since at least 1960. He denied that he was involved in Riggi's case and said: "Many kinds of people drop names of public figures. But no one is responsible for people dropping his name, whether the name droppers be reputable or disreputable individuals". DeCavalcante also discussed police bribery with DeCarlo. Two police chiefs named by DeCavalcante were John Ellmyer Jr. of Edison and Ralph C. Petrone of New Brunswick. In a February 4, 1965 discussion, DeCavalcante mentioned an illegal craps game which was being organized by a man known as "Mickey". According to DeCavalcante, Mickey "had an okay" from Ellymer to arrange the game but still "needed a contact possible on the county level". Mickey's "county level" contact was alleged to have been arranged by Dutch Mele, a former baseball player who operated taverns in Edison.

DeCavalcante was recorded expressing some bitterness at Carlo Gambino's decision to appoint Joseph Colombo of the Colombo crime family to the Commission as he had hoped that his own "family" would be given the opportunity to join the Commission as the Sixth Family. Speaking with his underboss Frank Majuri, he said: "[Colombo] sits like a baby next to Carl [Gambino] all the time. He'll do anything Carl wants him to do", and later mused: "Sometimes, Frank, the more things you see, the more disillusioned you become. You know, honesty and honorability, those things". The bug planted in DeCavalcante's office also revealed affairs he was having with his secretary and other women. Majuri was recorded telling him that he "shouldn't run around because [Gerardo] Catena and [Carlo] Gambino don't". On June 13, 1969, after transcripts of the recordings were unsealed in court, a reporter from The New York Times visited the DeCavalcante home in Princeton Township. Mary DeCavalcante told the reporter: "If you don't mind, I'd rather not talk about it. I don't mind your asking, but I hope you appreciate my feelings".

=== Conspiracy charges ===
DeCavalcante is reputed to have masterminded a plot to extort thousands of dollars over a six-week period in 1966 from the operators of an illegal dice game in the Philadelphia suburb of Trevose, Pennsylvania. On September 28, 1966, he allegedly sent two Brooklyn Mafiosi, Daniel Annunziata and Gaetano "Corky" Vastola, to the game with the intention of feigning surprise at discovering that the dice were loaded, then staging a holdup, demanding $20,000 and suggesting that DeCavalcante arbitrate the matter. Four gamblers were robbed at gunpoint at the game, which was held at a Trevose motel. After three meetings, one held at DeCavalcante's company in Kenilworth, one at a diner in Lawrence Township, and another at a second motel in Trevose, a $12,000 settlement was arranged by DeCavalcante. He was eventually paid $3,800 by the robbery victims as the adjudicator.

Alongside Philadelphia crime family boss Angelo Bruno, DeCavalcante appeared at Trenton Municipal Court on December 13, 1967, to answer to charges that they falsified applications for New Jersey driving licenses. On March 21, 1968, DeCavalcante, Vastola and Annunziata were arrested and indicted on charges of conspiring to violate federal extortion statutes following a 17-month racketeering investigation by three federal agencies. DeCavalcante was taken into custody at his Kenilworth plumbing and heating firm, where FBI agents seized three pistols and a shotgun from his office. On July 18, 1968, DeCavalcante was arrested by state and Union County officials as he left the Garden State Parkway in Kenilworth, and was charged under state statutes with illegally acquiring a .38 caliber pistol which had been stolen during a burglary in Fairless Hills, Pennsylvania. The gun was among those seized by the FBI from DeCavalcante's office.

In an effort to discover if his client's offices in Kenilworth were bugged by authorities in relation to the Trevose extortion case, DeCavalcante's attorney, Sidney "Chris" Franzblau, requested a discovery motion argued on January 17, 1969, at which Deputy Attorney General William J. Brennan Jr. was called to testify regarding any electronic surveillance that may have been utilized prior to DeCavalcante's arrest. At the request of Franzblau, 2,300 transcript pages of taped conversations compiled by the FBI in the "DeCavalcante Papers" were released to the public by David M. Satz Jr., the U.S. Attorney for the District of New Jersey, on June 10, 1969. Franzblau requested the release in order to learn whether or not any information leading to the indictment against his client was obtained via illegal wiretapping. The recordings were inadmissible as evidence because they had been made illegally and covered a period between 1961 and 1965, prior to the 1966 extortion specified in the indictment. The government maintained that the illegal wiretap was not the source of information that led to the indictments of DeCavalcante, Vastola and Annunziata.

DeCavalcante was among 55 men and women indicted by a federal grand jury on December 16, 1969, in connection with a $20 million-per-year interstate numbers racket centered in Newark and Troy, New York. U.S. Attorney General John N. Mitchell described the operation as one of the largest gambling syndicates in the United States. DeCavalcante was formally charged with gambling offenses on January 2, 1970. The following day, he attended the wedding of his son, Carl DeCavalcante, a senior at the University of Vermont, to Cynthia Ann Snyder at St Michael's Church in Trenton. Although he had initially barred news reporters from entering the ceremony, DeCavalcante relented and invited news people into the reception, saying: "You can drink what we drink, eat what we eat on me, but I don't want any of my guests embarrassed." Plainclothes policemen also photographed the wedding from outside.

The "DeCavalcante Papers" transcripts were physically released by Frederick B. Lacey, who succeeded David Satz as U.S. Attorney for New Jersey, on January 6, 1970. The lawyer Sidney Franzblau was responsible for inadvertently revealing organized crime secrets as the transcripts were made public because he had not asked that the disclosure be made only to the defense counsel. DeCavalcante subsequently dismissed Franzblau as his defense attorney and replaced him with Raymond A. Brown. The beginning of DeCavalcante's extortion trial, which was initially scheduled to commence on February 16, 1970, was delayed when Brown notified the U.S. Attorney's office that he would require time to familiarize himself with the case. In April 1970, DeCavalcante was being tried on the state weapons charges when he fell ill, forcing a halt to the trial.

During DeCavalcante's extortion conspiracy trial in Newark, which consisted almost entirely of presentation from the prosecution, the government contended that DeCavalcante had masterminded the extortion plot. One of the victims of the Trevose holdup, Kenneth Martin, testified for the prosecution that DeCavalcante acted as an arbitrator for Annunziata and Vastola, that a $12,000 settlement was arranged by DeCavalcante, and that DeCavalcante was paid $3,800 for his role. The defense did not present any witnesses or evidence and relied instead on summations to the jury. DeCavalcante maintained throughout the trial that he had been "framed" and that he had only served as an impartial mediator in a gambling dispute. On September 24, 1970, following an eight-day trial, DeCavalcante was convicted by a federal jury in Newark on three counts of conspiracy to extort money from the operators of the Trevose dice game. It was the first criminal conviction of DeCavalcante, who was 57 years old at the time. He "received the verdict impassively", according to The New York Times. DeCavalcante's co-defendants, Annunziata and Vastola, were convicted on one count each. His bail was set at $50,000 by U.S. District Judge Lawrence A. Whipple. DeCavalcante was sentenced on October 2, 1970, to the maximum penalty of 15 years in prison. Following his sentencing, DeCavalcante said: "What can I say? I don't know what happened. I tried to make things equal. But it's part of life. We take the bum deals with the good deals."

In January 1971, DeCavalcante pleaded guilty to a charge of conspiring to operate the Newark/Troy numbers racket at a secret federal court hearing in Newark. In order to protect the rights of other defendants in the case, DeCavalcante's guilty plea was not made public until the following month, by which time the cases of the other defendants had been resolved. On March 10, 1971, DeCavalcante's 1970 extortion conspiracy conviction was reversed by the U.S. Court of Appeals for the Third Circuit in Philadelphia after Judge Arlin M. Adams, acting on the opinion of a three-judge panel, ruled that the case against him, Annunziata and Vastola had been based on insufficient evidence. The ruling reversed two of the charges against DeCavalcante and ordered a new trial on the third charge. The convictions of Annunziata and Vastola were also overturned. DeCavalcante subsequently requested immediate freedom from the Federal House of Detention in Manhattan, where he had been held since his sentencing in October 1970. The request was denied by Herbert J. Stern, the Acting U.S. Attorney for New Jersey, who opposed releasing DeCavalcante because he was due to be sentenced in the gambling ring case. On March 15, 1971, DeCavalcante was sentenced at Newark Federal Court to five years' imprisonment on the gambling conviction. He was also fined $10,000. DeCavalcante was re-indicted by a Union County grand jury on August 17, 1971, on the state charges of receiving the stolen pistol which was seized by the FBI in 1968.

=== Imprisonment and later career ===
As a prisoner at the United States Penitentiary, Atlanta, DeCavalcante was praised for his work as a nurse in the federal prison system by Dr. Joseph Alderote, the prison's chief medical officer. Alderote wrote in a report that DeCavalcante "has proven to be one of the best inmate nurses that I have had under my supervision in the three years that I have been there", and described him as someone who had taken "sincere interest in chronic nursing type cases of elderly patients that we have in the hospital". Despite being denied parole earlier, DeCavalcante was granted mandatory release from prison on December 20, 1973, after serving more than half of his five‐year sentence. According to a spokesman for the Federal Bureau of Prisons in Washington, D.C., DeCavalcante was considered for release for good behavior and his work as an inmate nurse, and because he had served about half a year of his earlier conviction for extortion, which was subsequently overturned on appeal.

In the spring of 1974, DeCavalcante was stopped by a New Jersey State Police radar unit while driving his Cadillac on Interstate 287 in Harding and charged with speeding at 77 miles per hour on a 55-mile-per-hour limit highway. The case was first postponed because DeCavalcante was in Florida at the time, and again because he was ill with bronchitis. On July 16, 1975, Judge Marius Grosso denied a third postponement due to illness because a State Trooper claimed to have seen a supposedly ill DeCavalcante driving and apparently looking well. DeCavalcante did not attend the hearing at which Grosso fined him $12 for speeding and an additional $10 for court costs. It was not his first traffic violation conviction, as he had previously been fined at Princeton Township Municipal Court in August 1969 for driving at 52 miles an hour in a 45-mile-an-hour zone near his home on Mercer Road in Princeton.

DeCavalcante moved to Florida in 1976. In 1980, he passed control of the family to Giovanni "John the Eagle" Riggi and retired to Miami Beach, Florida. He started planning to build a legitimate resort casino in South Florida. However, the project did not proceed after voters rejected casino gambling in a 1986 referendum.

== Death ==
DeCavalcante died of natural causes at age of 84, at a hospital in Fort Lauderdale, Florida, on February 7, 1997. He is buried at Greenwood Cemetery in Hamilton, New Jersey.

== Media portrayal ==
Fictional characters like, Tony Soprano and Vito Corleone, are partially based on DeCavalcante.
