= David M. Satz Jr. =

American lawyer

United States Attorney for the District of New Jersey
- In office 1961–1969
- Preceded by: Chester A. Weidenburner
- Succeeded by: Donald Horowitz (acting)

Personal details
- Born: January 14, 1926 New York City, New York
- Died: December 25, 2009 (aged 83) Verona, New Jersey
- Education: Harvard University (BA); University of Pennsylvania

David M. Satz Jr. (January 14, 1926 – December 25, 2009) was an American attorney who served as U.S. Attorney for the District of New Jersey from 1961 to 1969.

== Early life and education ==
Satz was born in New York City in 1926. He received a Bachelor of Arts degree from Harvard University in 1948 and a Bachelor of Laws degree from the University of Pennsylvania Law School in 1951.

== Career ==
Satz joined the staff of the New Jersey Attorney General in 1954, serving as Deputy Attorney General until 1958 and as First Assistant Attorney General from 1958 to 1961. Then a resident of South Orange, New Jersey, Satz was named U.S. Attorney for the District of New Jersey by President John F. Kennedy in 1961. He served as U.S. Attorney until 1969, when he resigned to join the Newark law firm of Saiber & Schlesinger, which was renamed Saiber, Schlesinger & Satz (later Saiber Schlesinger Satz & Goldstein).

Notable cases include prosecution of Tino De Angelis, in a case dubbed the Salad Oil scandal and, later, based on the book of the same name, The Great Salad Oil Swindle, and investigation of mobster Simone Rizzo "Sam" DeCavalcante (alias "Sam The Plumber"); on the latter case, Satz worked with the F.B.I., releasing 13 volumes of wiretap transcripts "exposing the inner workings of the mob."

Satz was integral to pioneering casino gaming laws, particularly in New Jersey, serving as a trustee with the International Association of Gaming Attorneys from 1983 to 1998, and as its president from 1994 to 1996.

== Personal life ==
Satz was of counsel at Saiber LLC. He resided in Verona, New Jersey until his death in 2009.

Legal offices
Preceded by Chester A. Weidenburner	United States Attorney for the District of New Jersey; 1961 – 1969	Succeeded by Donald Horowitz
