= Union College (New Jersey) =

Public college in Union County, New Jersey, US

Union College of Union County, NJ
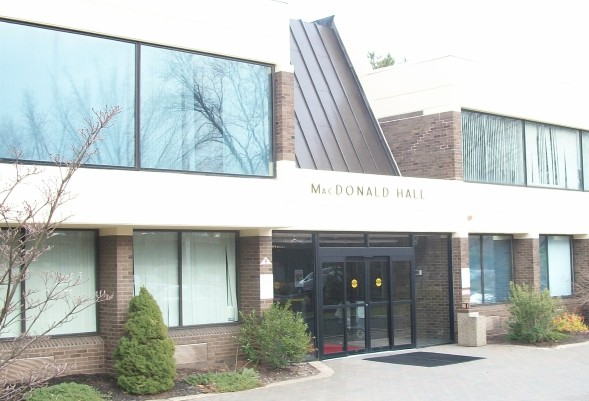
- MacDonald Hall
- Former names: Union County Junior College (1933–1936); Union Junior College (1936–1967); Union College (1967–1982); Union County College (1982–2022)
- Type: Public community college
- Established: 1933
- Academic affiliations: Sea-grant, Space-grant
- President: Margaret M. McMenamin
- Students: 8,298 (Fall 2020)
- Location: Cranford, Elizabeth, Plainfield and Scotch Plains, New Jersey, United States
- Campus: Suburban and urban
- Nickname: Owls
- Website: www.ucc.edu

Union College (formally known as Union College of Union County, NJ and previously known as Union County College) is a public community college in Union County, in the U.S. state of New Jersey. It was founded in 1933 as the first of New Jersey's public community colleges. The college has four campuses: Cranford, Elizabeth, Plainfield, and Scotch Plains. It is accredited by the Middle States Commission on Higher Education. The college offers more than 80 programs leading to Associate in Arts, Associate in Science, and Associate in Applied Science degrees and certificate programs provided by the Continuing Education program. It also offers distance education classes.

== History ==
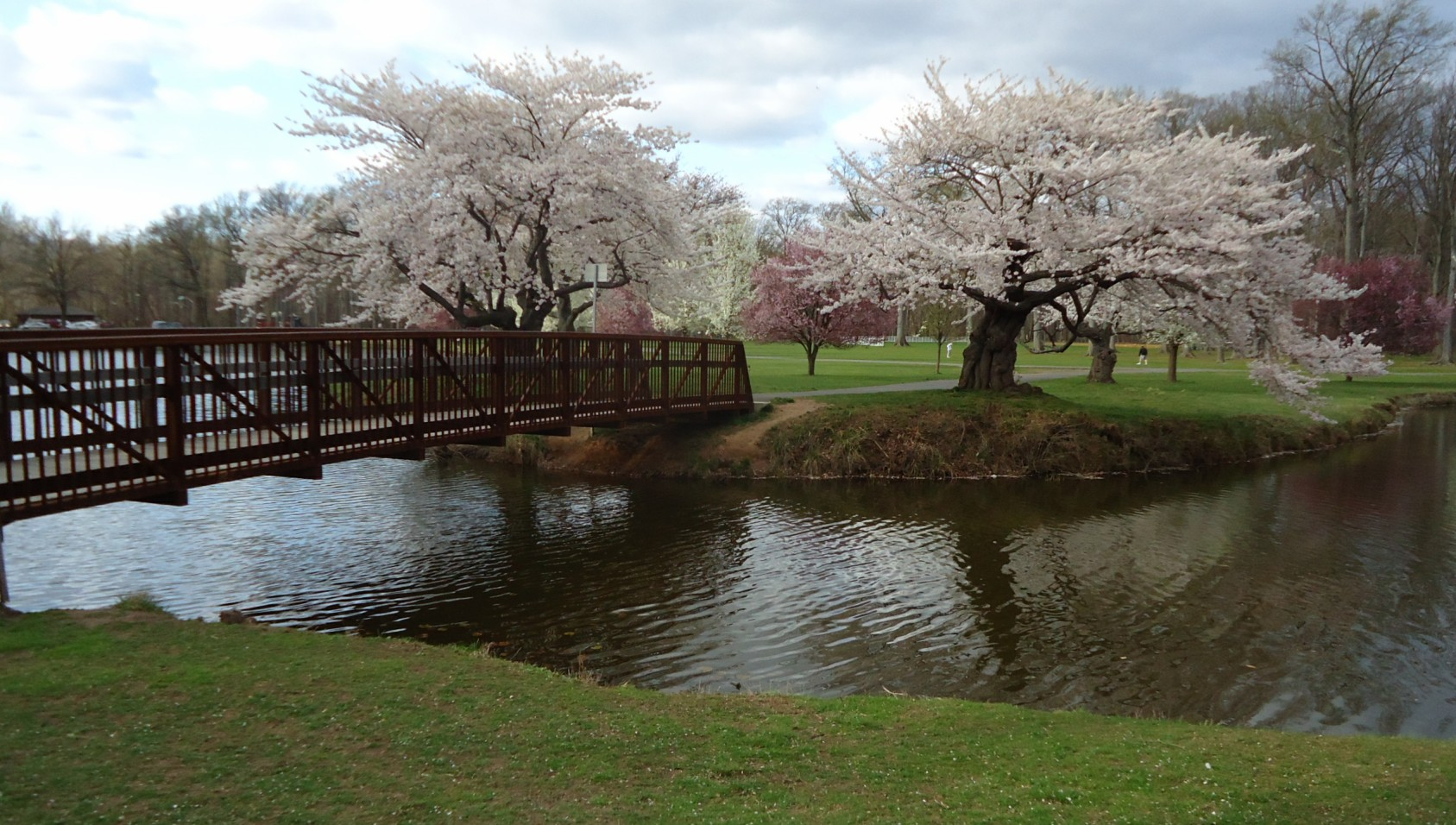
Students enjoy Nomahegan Park next to the college which features walking paths, nature trail, a lake (in picture), baseball diamond, and children's play equipment.

The college opened as Union County Junior College on October 16, 1933, in Roselle, with 243 evening students. With massive numbers of people out of work, there was strong pressure to educate people as a way to provide jobs; one account suggests that the official who "established Union County Junior College" was the Union county schools superintendent, Arthur L. Johnson, who was seeking ways for people to find employment and better themselves. According to one source, it was the oldest community college in New Jersey. Still, the college was "pitifully underfinanced" and rented space from a local high school. Its initial budget was $17,000 for the entire school. Its purpose at the time wasn't so much to teach undergraduates but to "provide jobs for unemployed teachers" during the Great Depression, according to historian Donald R. Raichle. An early administrator was Dean Hubert Banks Huntley. Raichle described the college's emerging mission was preparing "students in the first two years of college to make possible their later transfer to other colleges and universities. But funding problems became even more severe, and a lack of funds from the federal government in the middle 1930s forced a change back from public to independent status. Vocational training was emphasized; the curriculum catered to students who did not plan to further their education at four-year universities. The college was to have four distinct homes from its founding until 1983.

Twin challenges presented themselves in the next few decades: first, after World War II, returning soldiers bolstered by the GI bill swamped colleges and became a severe strain on resources in the late 1940s. In the 1960s, the college faced competing pressures from the "rapid proliferation of public community colleges in New Jersey." Career education became more varied, more sophisticated, more costly, according to Raichle.

By 1983, another major change occurred. The college had grown to 6000 students. It merged with the Union County Technical Institute in Scotch Plains, and it once again became a public college with the official name of Union County College. The college's structure was established by state statute on August 17, 1982. Between its founding in 1933 and 2007, it taught 1,100,000 students, with large numbers of them advancing to four-year colleges and universities, and it has graduated more than 25,000 students as well. The merger was presided over by college alumnus Saul Orkin, who had been president since 1974; Orkin died the following year of a heart attack at age sixty.

In 1992, there were 4,000 full and part-time students in Elizabeth, and 6,500 students in Cranford and Plainfield. One report in The New York Times in 1997 noted that graduates of Union County college had a lower student loan default rate (9%) than the national average of 10%. In the latter years of the first decade of the 21st century, an economic downturn caused admissions to swell, as students unable to afford more expensive colleges enrolled at Union County College. Enrollment was up 17% in 2010. And many students and families found that community colleges such as Union County college were attractive educational values.

In 2016, the college was sanctioned by the American Association of University Professors "for infringement of governance standards".

Effective July 1, 2022, the school's name became Union College of Union County, New Jersey.

== Student life ==
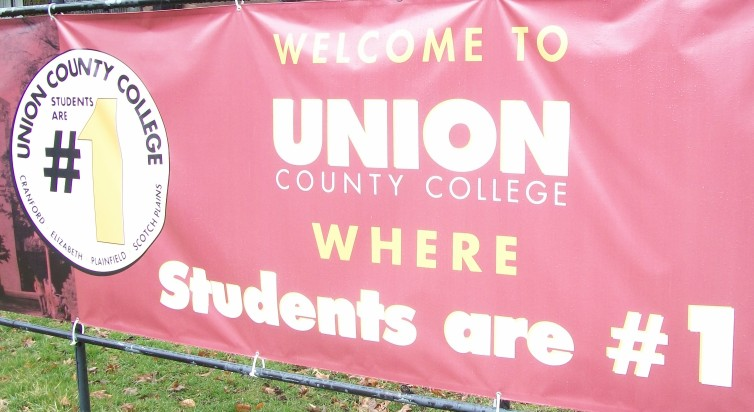

Since there are no dormitories, all students are commuters, unlike students who live in dormitories on campus. With the economic downturn of 2007–2010, students from wealthier towns who might normally go to "brand-name" colleges were attending Union County College, according to enrollment manager David Sheridan, who noted that community colleges have seen "big increases in enrollment" but found that many classes were "filled to capacity." The school works with students of varying capacities. For example, it accepted one student who had had learning issues in high school, and had a 1.9 grade point average, but with work and effort, and enrolling in extra courses during summers, he graduated with honors in biology in 2010 and has been accepted to Cornell University.

=== Academic honor societies ===
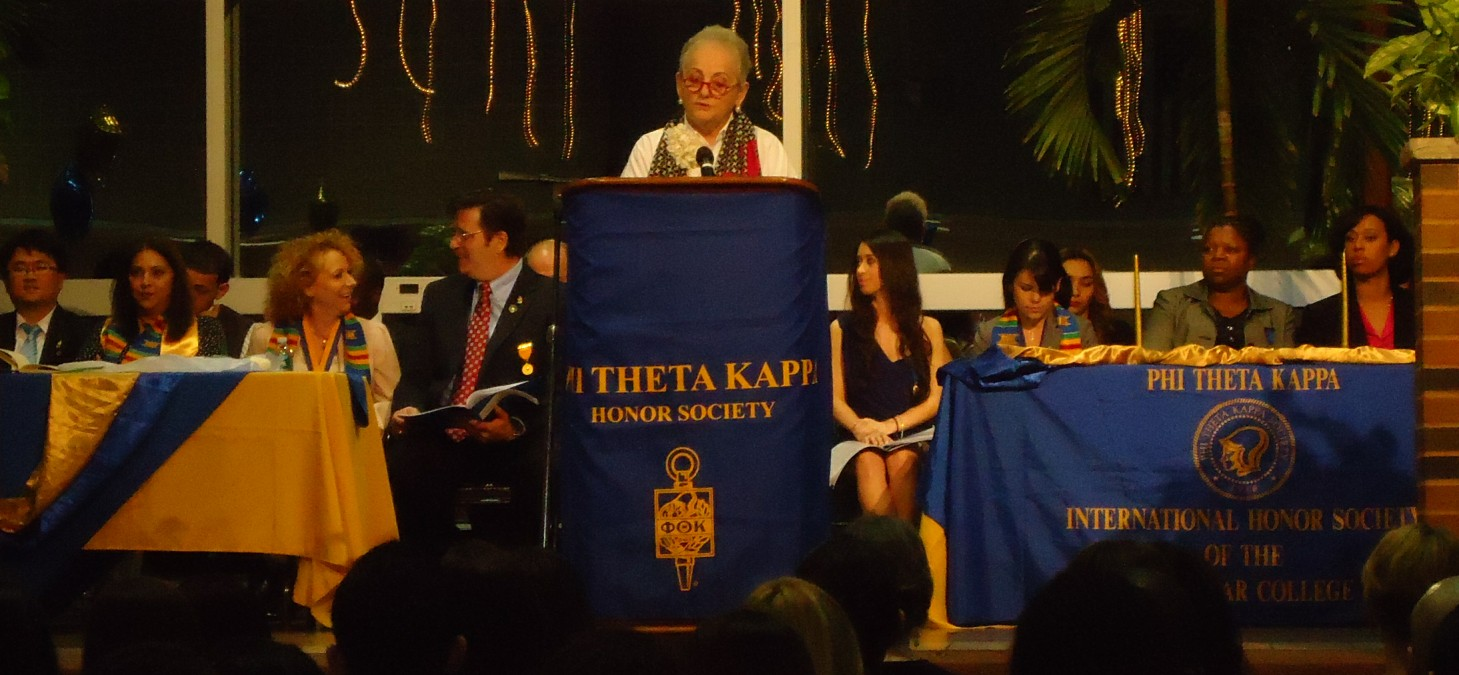
Ceremony marking induction of Iota Xi members of Phi Theta Kappa.

Honor societies include Phi Theta Kappa (Iota Xi chapter), Psi Beta, Mu Alpha Theta, Chi Alpha (Epsilon Psi chapter), Lambda Epsilon Chi, and Tau Alpha Pi. Phi Theta Kappa is the International Honor Society for two-year colleges. The Iota Xi chapter has thus far been awarded Five Star Chapter recognition 29 years in a row.

== Athletics ==
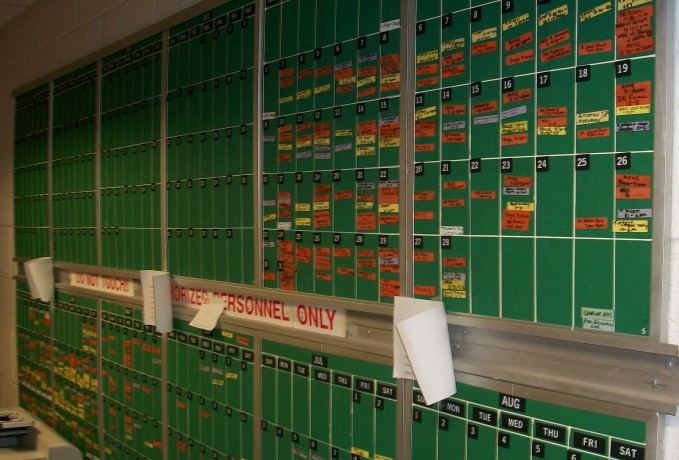
Athletic event scheduling board.

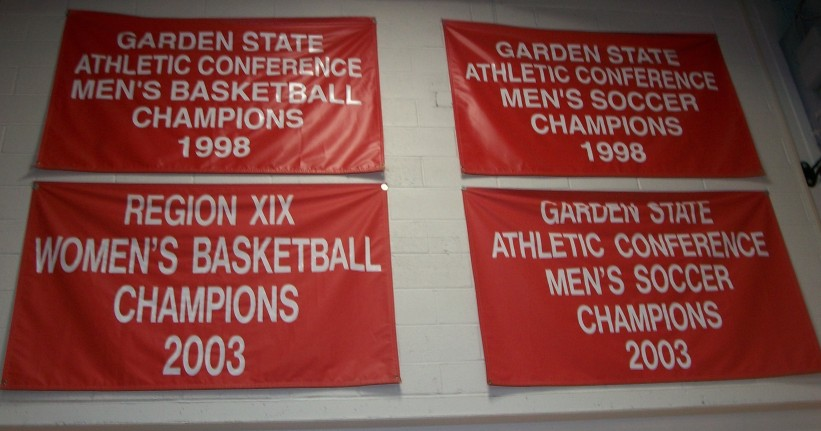

UCNJ offers baseball, men's and women's soccer, men's and women's basketball, volleyball, softball, cheerleading, men's and women's track, men's lacrosse and men's and women's golf. In September 2009, the men's soccer team won the National Junior College Athletic Association Division III National Championship by completing an eleven-game winning streak which included six straight playoff victories. After their victory, they were congratulated by college president Thomas Brown as well as two county Freeholders. Ten players of the 2009 national championship team belong to the Institute of Intensive English (IIE) Department. In 2009, the women's basketball team was undefeated and was ranked No. 8 nationally among Division 2 junior colleges. In October 1998, Union County Freeholders named Shane Walsh Field in memory of Shane Walsh, a player on the college's baseball team who died the preceding summer.

== Academics ==
=== Art ===
The Tomasulo Gallery has featured talented artists from New Jersey and elsewhere. In 2002, it displayed Nigerian-themed works by Morristown-based sculptor Bisa Washington entitled Down to the Bone. The College works with County officials to promote various arts programs such as the H.E.A.R.T. project (History, Education, Arts Reaching Thousands) which gives grants to artists, historians, and local groups; the amount of funding in 2010 was $75,000. The County's Teen Arts Festival attracted almost 4,000 middle and high school students for a two-day interval of music and dance performance as well as art exhibitions and workshops. In 2006, it showcased seven photographers whose work focused on New Jersey areas such as Asbury Park and Newark Airport and was curated by Mary Birmingham.

=== Theater ===
Union College had a professional theater company (The Theater Project), which has performed a wide variety of shows, including some of a political nature. For example, in 2008, it performed two plays relating to the presidency of George W. Bush described by the Suburban News as a "humorous" but "ultimately tragic commentary on political responsibility." In 2010, it did its first musical entitled Crowns with a four-weekend run from September through October in the Roy Smith theater on the Cranford campus. Theater groups sometimes get funding from county officials from grant programs; in 2010, the college received $2,100 to help pay for a dramatic performance of A Few Steps in a Stranger's Shoes which promotes understanding between students. Some productions attract reviews in the New York Times such as Rinne Groff's drama The Ruby Sunrise, which examined television's "allure and power." To celebrate the college's 75th anniversary, Jane Anderson's play about astronaut Christa McAuliffe in the Challenger explosion was performed in 2008.

=== Institute for Intensive English ===
The Institute for Intensive English provides a full-time program of intensive instruction in English for speakers of other languages. The purpose of the institute is to enhance students' English language for work or academics. After placement testing, students enter one of six levels of instruction that matches their abilities. In Levels 1 to 4, students register for four courses to improve listening, speaking, reading and writing, and study skills. In Levels 5 and 6, students register for four courses: two core courses covering advanced structures, listening, conversation and study skills, an academic reading course, and an academic writing course. Students may enroll in an additional pronunciation and conversation elective. Upon completing each course, there is an exit test to assess proficiency. While enrolled in ESL courses, students may take some additional content area courses, depending on a student's level.

=== Nursing ===
The college offers a variety of options in nursing. The Trinitas School of Nursing and the Muhlenberg Harold B. and Dorothy A. Snyder Schools of Nursing are approved by the New Jersey State Board of Nursing and are fully accredited by the National League for Nursing Accreditation Commission. Trinitas offers a generic program as well as a licensed practical nurse (LPN) to a registered nurse (RN) program. The LPN–to–RN Completion Program is designed for Licensed Practical Nurses who wish to return to school, but need to maintain their employment status. Classroom and clinical experiences are designed to meet the specific needs of the LPN. Trinitas had been using leased space in a converted warehouse in the Elizabethport section of the city of Elizabeth but after 1992 moved into a renovated utility building. There were 4000 full and part-time nursing students in Elizabeth in 1992. In one account, there were 2,000 nurses receiving further training at the Trinitas school in 2010. The Muhlenberg and Snyder program offers a day or evening track in nursing. Muhlenberg offers an Accelerated Program designed for individuals who have earned a BA or graduate degree in another discipline and wish to continue their studies in nursing. The nursing or clinical portion of the program can be completed in one year by attending from January to December as a full-time day student. Muhlenberg also offers an LPN–to–RN Career Ladder Program. After successful completion of an LPN transition course, the LPN program may be completed in two semesters.

== Facilities ==
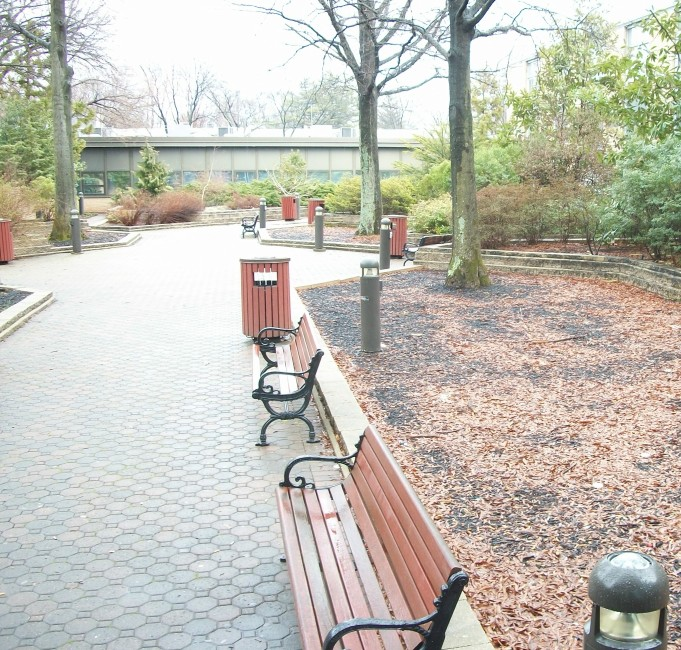
The Cranford campus has outdoor walkways.

The college has facilities on four different campuses: Cranford, Elizabeth, Scotch Plains, and Plainfield.

=== Libraries ===
The Union College Libraries are the Kenneth Campbell MacKay Library at Cranford, the Elizabeth I. Kellogg Library at Elizabeth, and the Plainfield Campus Library. With over 125,000 volumes in the combined collections, the libraries also subscribe to approximately 300 print journals, magazines, and newspapers. Approximately 30,000 full-text periodicals are available to students and faculty and others from 50 online subscription databases.

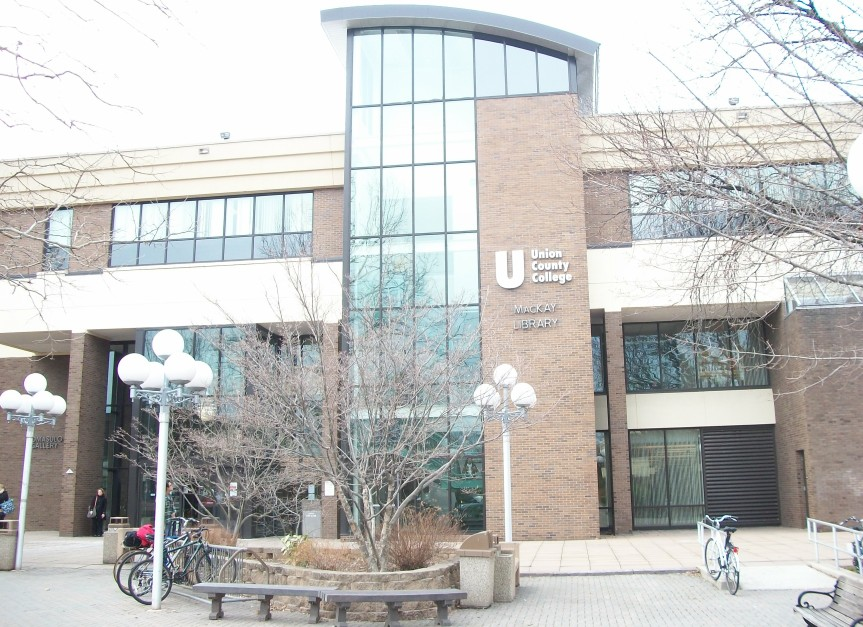
MacKay library.

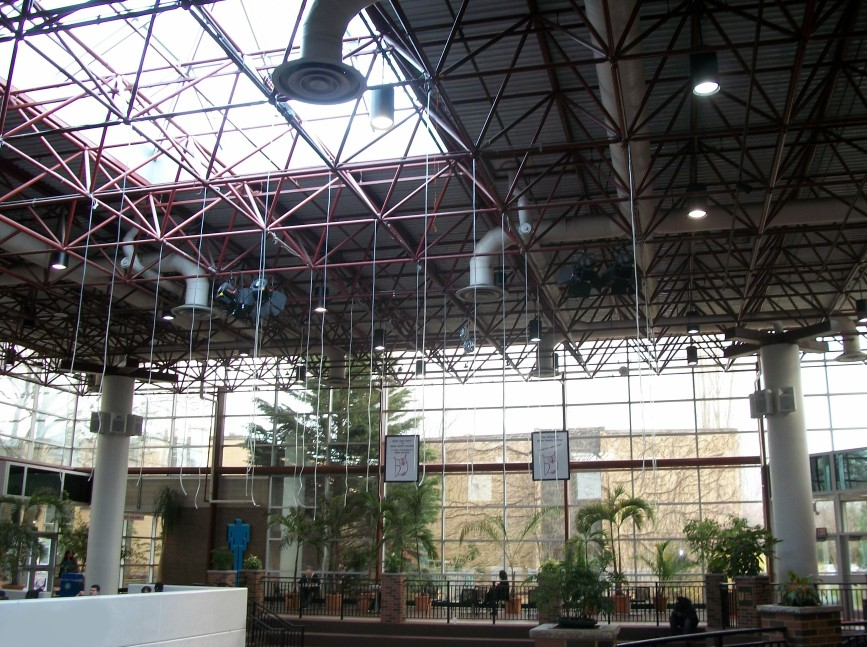
Student center in the Nomahegan building on the Cranford campus.

- MacKay library on the Cranford Campus serves as the main library at the college, with more than 100,000 volumes and more than 300 journal and newspaper subscriptions. There is a 38-seat information commons, a 28-seat hands–on library instruction room and ten study rooms. A collection of award-winning children's books known as the Stock Collection is available for the children of students, staff, and faculty.
- The Kellogg Library is located on the first floor of the Elizabeth I. Kellogg Building.
- The Plainfield Campus Library is located on the lower level of Building #1 on the Plainfield campus. Both the Kellogg and Plainfield libraries have more than 10,000 volumes and approximately 75 periodical subscriptions available for students doing research. These collections are tailored to support the curriculum offered on each campus.

=== Academic Learning Centers ===
The Academic Learning Centers provide academic support to the student population through tutoring and computer assisted instruction at all three campus locations.

=== Sperry Observatory ===
The William Miller Sperry Observatory, also known simply as the Sperry Observatory, is an astronomical observatory owned by the college and jointly operated with Amateur Astronomers, Inc., on the Cranford campus. It was named after William Miller Sperry, a Cranford businessman and co-founder of the S&H Green Stamps Company. The building was dedicated on May 16, 1967, by William Sperry Beinecke. 2010, with tight budgets, the group which shares uses of the facility, called Amateur Astronomers Inc., had discussions with the college about how to share expenses and resources. There were negotiations between the private group and the school about budgeting; the school owns the observatory and paid most of its expenses; when budgets got tight during 2009 and 2010, there was considerable pressure to use the facility for other purposes such as classrooms. There were many discussions, but by May 2010, the group and the college came to a "win-win" agreement about how to work together. Their new agreement will be in effect until July 2012. Amateur Astronomers, Inc. meets in Nomahegan Hall each month and sponsors talks on celestial topics.

=== Sidney F. Lessner Building ===
The Trinitas nursing school had been using a leased warehouse space in the Elizabethport section of Elizabeth. But in 1992, the school paid $2 million for the seven-story Elizabethtown Gas Company building in the downtown section, and then spent another $11 million renovating it. The new facility has a 3,100-square-foot (290 m^{2}) auditorium with a stage and theatrical lighting, a lounge, a library, exhibition rooms and galleries, and represented a major expansion of the college in the city of Elizabeth.

=== Elizabeth I. Kellogg building ===
The Kellogg building on the Elizabeth campus houses the second largest nursing school in the United States. It has six stories and cost $48 million to build, and serves 8,300 students, including 2,300 enrolled in the nursing program. The building houses the new "Trinitas nursing school, the college's Industry Business Institute, continuing education offerings, lecture hall, and a state-of-the-art information commons and library" according to the Suburban News. A ribbon cutting ceremony to mark its opening was held in September 2009. It has a state-of-the-art simulation learning center. To enhance learning, some mannequins can be hooked up to simulate a pregnant woman, complete with fetal monitoring and models that "actually breathe" with simulated heart and lung sounds.

=== Kellogg Greenhouse and Historic Tree Grove & Arboretum ===
Next to the campus pond at the Sperry Observatory sits the Historic Tree Grove & Arboretum. Each tree is a seed-grown or cutting-grown offspring of a noteworthy historical tree. There are over seventy-five trees in the grove including a Robin Hood English oak and a Martin Luther King Jr. sycamore. In the Kellogg Greenhouse and the nursery near it on campus, seedlings of these trees are grown and eventually moved from the nursery into the grove. The seedlings are available to schools and historic organizations.

== Notable people ==
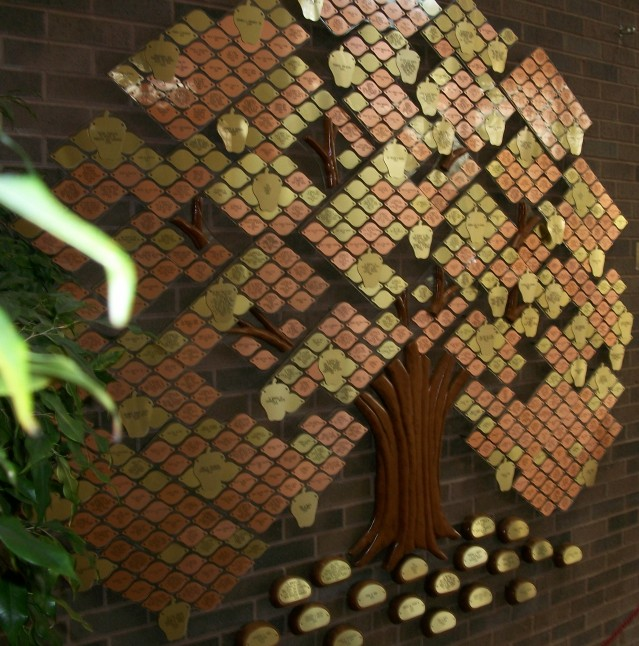
Plaque honoring donors.

=== Faculty ===
Professor Lawrence D. Hogan taught history at the college and wrote the "definitive book on black baseball" titled Shades of Glory: The Negro Leagues and the Story of African-American Baseball, which received critical attention from The New York Times.

=== Alumni ===
Notable alumni of Union College include:

- Cheryl Barnes (born c. 1951), singer and actress
- William A. Chatfield (born 1951), government executive and lobbyist who served as the 11th Director of Selective Service
- Karen Civil (born 1984), social media and digital media marketing strategist
- Horace Jenkins (born 1974), former professional basketball player who played in the NBA for the Detroit Pistons
- James M. McGowan (1920–2004), politician who served in the New Jersey General Assembly from 1957 to 1963
- Nicholas Scutari (born 1968), politician and attorney who has served as the 115th president of the New Jersey Senate
- Chester A. Weidenburner (1913–1985), lawyer and judge who served as U.S. Attorney for the District of New Jersey and as a Judge of the New Jersey Superior Court
