= Jose L. Linares =

American judge (born 1953)

Chief Judge of the United States District Court for the District of New Jersey
- In office May 31, 2017 – May 16, 2019
- Preceded by: Jerome B. Simandle
- Succeeded by: Freda L. Wolfson

Judge of the United States District Court for the District of New Jersey
- In office December 3, 2002 – May 16, 2019
- Appointed by: George W. Bush
- Preceded by: Alfred James Lechner Jr.
- Succeeded by: Georgette Castner

Personal details
- Born: November 30, 1953 (age 72) Havana, Cuba
- Education: Jersey City State College (BA); Temple University Beasley School of Law (JD)

Jose L. Linares (born November 30, 1953) is a former United States district judge of the United States District Court for the District of New Jersey, and the former Chief Judge of that same Court from 2017 to 2019. In May 2019, he resigned as Chief Judge to return to private practice at McCarter & English.

== Education and career ==
Born in Havana, Cuba, Linares and his family emigrated to Spain and then settled in the United States, first in Verona, New Jersey, and then Newark, New Jersey. He played prep football at Immaculate Conception High School in Montclair, New Jersey.

He received a Bachelor of Arts degree from Jersey City State College in 1975 and a Juris Doctor from Temple University Beasley School of Law in 1978. He was a supervising attorney of the New York City Department of Investigation from 1978 to 1980. He was in private practice in New Jersey from 1980 to 2000. He was a judge on the Essex County Superior Court, New Jersey from 2000 to 2002.

== District court service ==
On August 1, 2002, Linares was nominated by President George W. Bush to a seat on the United States District Court for the District of New Jersey vacated by Alfred James Lechner Jr. He was confirmed by the United States Senate on November 14, 2002, and received his commission on December 3, 2002. He became Chief Judge on May 31, 2017. He retired from active service on May 16, 2019.

== Notable case ==
In February 2016, Mercedes-Benz was sued by private plaintiffs alleging its BlueTEC engines violate standards in a manner similar to the Volkswagen emissions scandal. On December 6, 2016, Judge Linares threw out the lawsuit, finding that the plaintiffs had no standing.

== See also ==
- List of Hispanic and Latino American jurists

== Sources ==
Legal offices
Preceded by Alfred James Lechner Jr.	Judge of the United States District Court for the District of New Jersey; 2002–2019	Succeeded by Georgette Castner
Preceded by Jerome B. Simandle	Chief Judge of the United States District Court for the District of New Jersey; 2017–2019	Succeeded by Freda L. Wolfson
