= Rogue Trader (film) =

1999 British film by James Dearden

- Video-release poster
- Directed by: James Dearden
- Written by: James Dearden
- Based on: Rogue Trader: How I Brought Down Barings Bank and Shook the Financial World by Nick Leeson; Edward Whitley
- Produced by: Janette Day; James Dearden; Paul Raphael
- Starring: Ewan McGregor; Anna Friel
- Narrated by: Ewan McGregor
- Cinematography: Jean-François Robin
- Edited by: Catherine Creed
- Music by: Richard Hartley
- Production company: Granada Film
- Distributed by: Pathé Distribution
- Release date: 25 June 1999 (United Kingdom)
- Running time: 101 minutes
- Country: United Kingdom
- Language: English
- Budget: $12,800,000 (estimated)
- Box office: £969,565 (UK sub-total)

Rogue Trader is a 1999 British biographical drama film written and directed by James Dearden and starring Ewan McGregor and Anna Friel. The film centers on the life of former derivatives trader Nick Leeson and the 1995 collapse of Barings Bank.

Following an interview with Nick Leeson in prison, Sir David Frost realised the potential for a movie and optioned the rights to Nick's story. Frost executive produced the film, which was based on Leeson's 1996 book Rogue Trader: How I Brought Down Barings Bank and Shook the Financial World.

== Plot ==
Rogue Trader tells the true story of Nick Leeson, a young employee of Barings Bank who after a successful spell working for the firm's office in Indonesia is sent to Singapore as General Manager of the Trading Floor on the SIMEX exchange. The movie follows Leeson's rise as he soon becomes one of Barings' key traders. However, everything is not as it appears – through the 88888 error account, Nick is hiding huge losses as he gambles away Barings' money with little more than the bat of an eyelid from the powers-that-be back in London.

Eventually the losses mount up to well over £800 million and Nick, along with his wife Lisa, decide to leave Singapore and escape to Malaysia. Nick does not realise the severity of his losses until he reads in the newspaper that Barings has gone bankrupt. They then decide to return to London but Nick is arrested en route in Frankfurt. Nick is extradited to Singapore where he is sentenced to six and a half years in jail. While in prison, Lisa divorces him and Nick is diagnosed with colon cancer. Because of this, he did not complete his sentence.

== Cast ==
- Ewan McGregor as Nick Leeson
- Anna Friel as Lisa Leeson
- Pip Torrens as Simon Jones
- Tom Wu as George Seow
- Tim McInnerny as Tony Hawes
- Nigel Lindsay as Ron Baker
- John Standing as Peter Baring
- Lee Ross as Danny Argyropoulos
- Yves Beneyton as Pierre Beaumarchais
- Betsy Brantley as Brenda Granger
- Caroline Langrishe as Ash Lewis
- Ivan Heng as The Bartender
- Rob Lemming as Trader #3
- Irene Ng as Bonny Li

== Release and distribution ==
Rogue Trader was released on 25 June 1999 in the United Kingdom by Pathé in 174 cinemas and grossed £269,871 in its opening weekend, placing fifth at the UK box office. It was aired the same day in the United States on television on Cinemax. It flopped at the box office, grossing less than £1 million in the UK.

== Music ==
During a bar scene, the Blur song "Song 2" is heard playing. This is an anachronism as the song was not released until three years after the scene was set.

== Reception ==
Rogue Trader was poorly received by critics. On the review aggregator website Rotten Tomatoes, only 33% of 24 critics' reviews are positive, with an average rating of 4.9/10. The consensus summarizes: "Rogue Trader tells its headline-grabbing true story too late to really have much of an impact - and too clumsily to take advantage of Ewan McGregor's game performance."
