= Salad oil scandal =

1963 corporate fraud

The salad oil scandal was an American corporate scandal in 1963 that caused more than $180 million ($1.89 billion in 2025) in losses to corporations. Tino De Angelis, a commodities broker and owner of the company Allied Crude Vegetable Oil, took out fraudulent loans secured by nonexistent inventory of vegetable oil. He used the proceeds to pay business and private expenses and to speculate on the futures market. A crash in the futures market rendered Allied insolvent, which led its creditors to discover the fraud. Affected corporations included American Express, Bank of America and Chase Manhattan Bank, and many international companies, such as Bank Leumi.

== Background ==
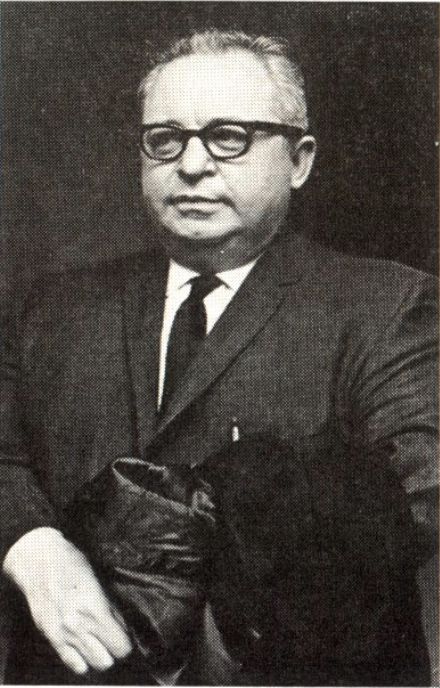
Anthony "Tino" De Angelis

Before Allied, De Angelis ran Gobel, a company selling lard, which repeatedly faced sanctions for poor business practices. Gobel was sued by the Yugoslav government for failing to meet quality requirements, by the United States government for supplying meat from uncertified sources, and by the German government for providing low-quality materials. These lawsuits eventually caused the company's bankruptcy. The United States Securities and Exchange Commission also brought an unsuccessful action alleging that Gobel and De Angelis had used fictitious inventory to obtain loans.

In the aftermath of Gobel, De Angelis created Allied and immediately encountered legal problems. He aimed to take advantage of the Food for Peace program and participate as a supplier, but in 1961, Allied was suspended by the Agriculture Department for falsifying shipping papers to collect government funds. Allied soon settled the claim by agreeing to repay the funds with interest.

Allied's business practices also raised flags. According to journalist Norman Charles Miller, Allied was rumored to be a Mafia front because its prices seemed unprofitable and its volume seemed unmanageable. In 1963, Allied claimed to store more vegetable oil than existed in the entire nation.

Miller claims that numerous financial institutions ignored these risks because the profit from Allied was too great. Allied was the most profitable customer of American Express Warehousing. Even when American Express sold the warehousing unit, it specifically kept Allied as its customer while selling off the rest of the warehousing business. Similarly, banks and brokers found a very profitable client in Allied and continued doing business with it despite the risks.

== Fraud ==
As is common practice for commodity businesses, Allied used its physical inventory of oil as collateral to secure loans. Banks would accept warehouse receipts which certified that a third-party warehouse had audited the inventory and was currently in control of it. This allowed the banks to trust that the collateral was secure. To provide this service for Allied, the American Express Warehouse company took control of an Allied storage facility so the inventory could be under third-party control as required by the banks. However, American Express kept the existing staff who maintained close ties to De Angelis.

To get access to increasing amounts of cash, Allied fraudulently inflated its inventory. Allied fooled American Express's warehouse inspectors by building hidden compartments in tanks to reduce the oil needed to fill them. Other times, the same oil would be moved from one tank to the next so the same oil would be counted multiple times, and the tanks were otherwise filled with water. This required the staff of the storage facility to continue to assist De Angelis even though they were technically employees of American Express.

Later, De Angelis even skipped attempts to deceive auditors and resorted to forging warehouse receipts directly. Crossing state lines with forged warehouse receipts would be the primary charge in his criminal case.

By 1963, the amount of soybean and cottonseed oil claimed to exist in a single facility by Allied exceeded all the soybean and cottonseed oil in the country. In all, Allied posted 900,000 short tons (820,000 tonnes) of oil as collateral for $180 million in loans, when the actual stock was a mere 55,000 short tons (50,000 tonnes).

== Collapse ==
Crash of soybean oil futures precipitated by the salad oil scandal

As the growing fraud already caused Allied to purchase large amounts of oil futures, De Angelis fatally decided to double down and try to corner the market. By November 14 1963, 90% of cottonseed oil contracts on the Produce Exchange were owned by Allied. Allied's purchasing activity elevated the price of cottonseed and soybean oil futures to artificial levels but Allied needed to continue buying to keep the prices there, as even a minor drop in prices would result in millions of dollars of margin calls against Allied.

On November 15, Allied was informed that its activities in the futures market were being investigated by the Commodity Exchange Authority. This meant Allied could no longer continue buying futures to support the inflated prices. On the same day, the US Senate suspended debate over the Soviet Union wheat deal which reduced confidence in a similar deal occurring for other commodities. As a result, cottonseed and soybean oil futures prices collapsed. Margin calls began immediately and Allied started filing for bankruptcy on November 18.

== Impact ==
As the certifier of the bulk of the warehouse receipts, the American Express subsidiary, American Express Warehousing, Ltd., was liable for the losses. As a result, American Express Warehousing filed for bankruptcy with $130,000 in assets against $210 million in claims. American Express settled on behalf of its subsidiary by offering $60 million to the claimants. American Express stock dropped more than a third, reducing overall value by $80 million.

Overall 51 financial institutions were left with bad loans or claims against nonexistent inventory, including Bank of America, Chase Manhattan Bank, and Bank Leumi. While those institutions survived their losses, Ira Haupt did not. A brokerage firm and a member of the New York Stock Exchange, it became insolvent when the fraud was found. NYSE worried that the bankruptcy of a major brokerage firm with 20,000 customers would send panic through the markets, particularly with the recent assassination of John F. Kennedy. To prevent a crash, NYSE resolved to force-liquidate Ira Haupt. NYSE guaranteed each customer's security holdings by providing $36 million in additional funding. As a result, Ira Haupt partners lost their capital, as all proceeds were used to cover customer claims.

During Allied's bankruptcy proceedings, millions of dollars were discovered missing. An accounting firm calculated that Allied had lost $100 million in between the futures contracts and selling commodities for losses but at least $20 million was questionably transferred to affiliates and millions more were unaccounted for. Questionable transactions include $700,000 worth of checks withdrawn by De Angelis's son Thomas De Angelis. Additionally, $500,000 was discovered in a Swiss numbered bank account. While funds from this account were returned, it was suspected that De Angelis had similarly hidden more funds.

De Angelis was charged with 19 counts of fraud and conspiracy for forging warehouse receipts. He pled guilty to four charges and was sentenced in 1965 to 20 years. He was released in 1972.

== See also ==
- The Great Salad Oil Swindle (book)
