= Georgette Castner =

American judge (born 1979)

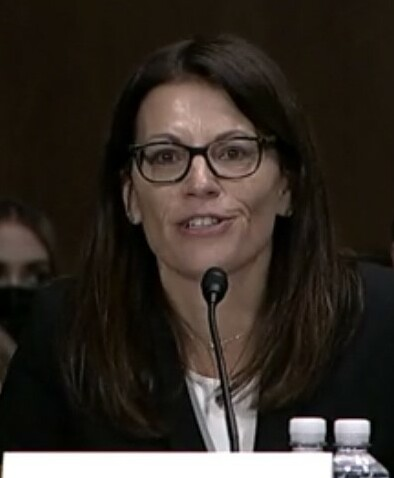

Judge of the United States District Court for the District of New Jersey
- Incumbent
- Assumed office April 5, 2022
- Appointed by: Joe Biden
- Preceded by: Jose L. Linares

Personal details
- Born: Georgette Fries; 1979 (age 46–47) Philadelphia, Pennsylvania, U.S.
- Education: The College of New Jersey (BS); Rutgers University (JD)

Georgette Castner (née Fries; born 1979) is an American lawyer from New Jersey who is a United States district judge of the United States District Court for the District of New Jersey.

== Education ==
Castner received her Bachelor of Science, cum laude, from The College of New Jersey in 2002 and her Juris Doctor, with honors, from Rutgers Law School in 2006.

== Career ==
Castner served as a law clerk for Judge Joseph F. Lisa on the New Jersey Superior Court, Appellate Division, from 2006 to 2007. She was then a partner at Montgomery McCracken Walker & Rhoads LLP in Cherry Hill, New Jersey, where her focus was on white collar criminal defense and product liability law. She joined the firm in 2007 as an associate before becoming a partner in 2015. Castner was also a co-chair of the firm's Cannabis Law Practice Group. She has served on the New Jersey Supreme Court Committee on Character and the New Jersey Supreme Court Committee on Model Civil Jury Charges.

=== Federal judicial service ===
On November 3, 2021, President Joe Biden nominated Castner to serve as a United States district judge of the United States District Court for the District of New Jersey. President Biden nominated Castner to the seat vacated by Judge Jose L. Linares, who retired on May 16, 2019. Castner was recommended by Senator Robert Menendez. On December 15, 2021, a hearing on her nomination was held before the Senate Judiciary Committee. On January 3, 2022, her nomination was returned to the President under Rule XXXI, Paragraph 6 of the United States Senate; she was later renominated the same day. On January 20, 2022, her nomination was reported out of committee by a 12–10 vote. On March 16, 2022, the Senate invoked cloture on her nomination by a 49–46 vote. On March 31, 2022, her nomination was confirmed by a 52–47 vote. She received her judicial commission on April 5, 2022. She was sworn into office on April 7, 2022, becoming the youngest female district judge for the District of New Jersey.

== Personal life ==
Castner is married to Democratic lawyer Bill Castner. In 2018, Democratic Governor Phil Murphy named Bill Castner as his senior adviser on firearms.

Legal offices
Preceded by Jose L. Linares	Judge of the United States District Court for the District of New Jersey; 2022–present	Incumbent
