= Alfred James Lechner Jr. =

American judge

Judge of the United States District Court for the District of New Jersey
- In office June 9, 1986 – October 1, 2001
- Appointed by: Ronald Reagan
- Preceded by: Frederick Bernard Lacey
- Succeeded by: Jose L. Linares

Personal details
- Born: Alfred James Lechner Jr. 1948 (age 77–78) Elizabeth, New Jersey, U.S.
- Education: Xavier University (B.S.); Notre Dame Law School (J.D.)

Alfred James Lechner Jr. (born 1948) is a former United States district judge of the United States District Court for the District of New Jersey.

== Education and career ==
Born in Elizabeth, New Jersey, Lechner is the first of five children to Marie G. McCormack, a stay-at-home mother, and Alfred L. Lechner, a milkman. His family's financial situation was strained. He attended St. Genevieve's Grammar School, Elizabeth, and Roselle Catholic High School, Roselle, New Jersey. He received a Bachelor of Science degree from Xavier University, Cincinnati and a Juris Doctor from Notre Dame Law School where he was an editor of the Law Review. He is a conservative Catholic. He retired from the US Marine Corps with the rank of Lieutenant Colonel. He was in private practice in New York City, and in Elizabeth, serving as a special counsel to the Elizabeth, New Jersey Department of Law. He was a judge of the New Jersey Superior Court from January 1984 to June 1986 and a United States District Judge (DNJ) from June 1986 to October 2001. He was nominated by President Reagan and unanimously confirmed by a voice vote of the US Senate.

== Federal judicial service ==
On April 8, 1986, Lechner was nominated by President Ronald Reagan to a seat on the United States District Court for the District of New Jersey vacated by Judge Frederick Bernard Lacey. Lechner was confirmed by the United States Senate on June 6, 1986, and received his commission on June 9, 1986. Lechner served in that capacity until October 1, 2001, when he resigned.

== Post judicial service ==
Lechner was hired in November 2015 as the president and CEO of the Cause of Action Institute, which is engaged in activities similar to those of the more well-known Judicial Watch. Lechner was in the news due to Cause of Action's Freedom on Information Act litigation brought with respect to the July, 2016 shooting of police in Dallas, Texas.

== Sources ==
Legal offices
Preceded by Frederick Bernard Lacey	Judge of the United States District Court for the District of New Jersey; 1986–2001	Succeeded by Jose L. Linares
