= Jordan Belfort =

American stockbroker (born 1962)

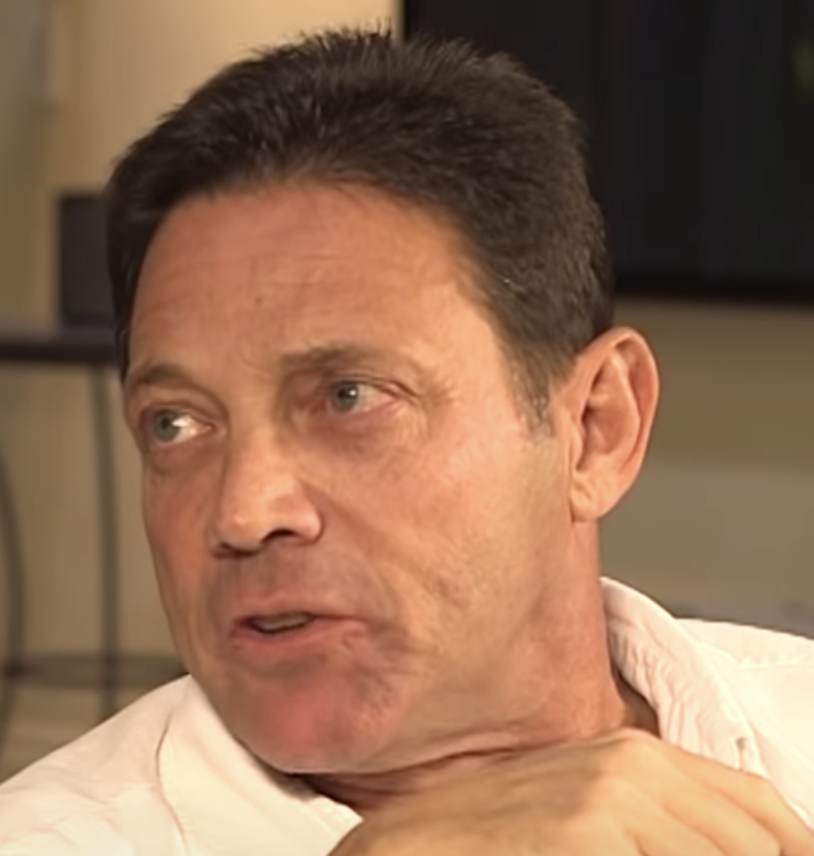
- Belfort in 2017
- Born: Jordan Ross Belfort; July 9, 1962 (age 64); New York City, U.S.
- Education: American University (BS)
- Occupations: Businessman; speaker; author
- Spouse: Denise Lombardo (m. 1985; div. 1991) Nadine Caridi (m. 1991; div. 2005) Anne Koppe (m. 2008; div. 2020) Cristina Invernizzi (m. 2021)
- Belfort's voice On the importance of rapport in business
- Website: jb.online

Jordan Ross Belfort (/ˈbɛlfərt/ BELL-fort) is an American former stockbroker and businessman who pleaded guilty to fraud and related crimes in connection with stock-market manipulation and running a boiler room as part of a penny-stock scam in 1999. Belfort spent 22 months in prison as part of an agreement under which, becoming an informant for the FBI and wearing a covert listening device ("wire"), he gave testimony against numerous partners and subordinates in his fraud scheme. He published the memoir The Wolf of Wall Street in 2007, which was adapted into Martin Scorsese's film of the same name released in 2013, in which he was played by Leonardo DiCaprio.

== Early life ==
Belfort was born in 1962 in the Bronx, a borough of New York City, to Jewish parents, Maxwell "Max" Belfort and Leah (née Markowitz). They were both accountants. He has an older brother named Robert. His paternal grandfather, Jack Belfort (1904–1970), was an immigrant from Russia, while his grandmother was a Second Generation American born to Lithuanian parents in New Jersey. Belfort was raised in Bayside, Queens. Between completing high school and starting college, Belfort and his close childhood friend Elliot Loewenstern earned $20,000 selling scooped Italian ice from styrofoam coolers to people at Jones Beach Field 2 and West-end 2.

Belfort went on to graduate from American University with a degree in biology. He planned to use the money earned with Loewenstern to pay for dental school, and enrolled at the University of Maryland School of Dentistry. However, the dean of the dental school gave a welcoming speech on the first day in which he said, "The golden age of dentistry is over. If you're here simply because you're looking to make a lot of money, you're in the wrong place." Belfort subsequently elected not to attend the graduate program.

== Career ==
=== Early ventures ===
Belfort became a door-to-door meat and seafood salesman on Long Island, New York. He claims in interviews and his memoirs that the business was an initial success; he grew his meat-selling business to employ several workers and sell 5,000 pounds (2,300 kilograms) of beef and fish a week. The business ended up failing, and he filed for bankruptcy at 25.

According to his memoirs and interviews, a family friend helped him find a job as a trainee stockbroker at L.F. Rothschild. Belfort says he was laid off after that firm experienced financial difficulties related to the Black Monday stock market crash of 1987.

=== Stratton Oakmont ===
Belfort founded Stratton Oakmont as a franchise of Stratton Securities, then later bought out the original founder. Stratton Oakmont functioned as a boiler room that marketed penny stocks and defrauded investors with "pump and dump" stock sales. During his years at Stratton, Belfort led a life of lavish parties and intensive use of recreational drugs, especially methaqualone—sold to him under the brand name "Quaalude"—that resulted in an addiction. Stratton Oakmont at one point employed over 1,000 stock brokers and was involved in stock issues totaling more than $1 billion, including being behind the initial public offering for footwear company Steve Madden. The firm was targeted by law enforcement officials throughout nearly its entire history, and its notoriety inspired the film Boiler Room (2000), as well as the biopic The Wolf of Wall Street (2013).

Stratton Oakmont was under near-constant scrutiny from the National Association of Securities Dealers (now the Financial Industry Regulatory Authority) from 1989 onward. Finally, in December 1996, the NASD expelled Stratton Oakmont, putting it out of business. Belfort was then indicted for securities fraud and money laundering in 1999.

Belfort became an informant for the FBI and wore a wire against numerous partners and associates, later testifying against many of them. On July 18, 2003, Belfort was sentenced to four years in prison. Belfort served 22 months of the sentence at the Taft Correctional Institution in Taft, California, in exchange for a plea deal with the Federal Bureau of Investigation for running pump-and-dump scams that led to investor losses of approximately $200 million. Belfort was ordered to pay back $110.4 million that he swindled from stock buyers. Belfort shared a cell with Tommy Chong while serving his sentence, and Chong encouraged him to write about his experiences as a stockbroker. The pair remained friends after their release from prison, with Belfort crediting Chong for his new career direction as a motivational speaker and writer. At a motivational talk that he delivered in Dubai, United Arab Emirates, on May 19, 2014, Belfort stated: "I got greedy. ... Greed is not good. Ambition is good, passion is good. Passion prospers. My goal is to give more than I get, that's a sustainable form of success. ... Ninety-five per cent of the business was legitimate. ... It was all brokerage firm issues. It was all legitimate, nothing to do with liquidating stocks." Federal prosecutors and SEC officials involved in the case, however, have said, "Stratton Oakmont was not a real Wall Street firm, either literally or figuratively."

=== Restitution ===
Belfort's restitution agreement required him to pay 50% of his income toward restitution to the 1,513 clients he had defrauded until 2009, with a total of $110 million in restitution further mandated. About $10 million of the $110 million that had been recovered by Belfort's victims as of 2013 was the result of the sale of forfeited properties.

In October 2013, federal prosecutors filed a complaint against Belfort. Several days later, the U.S. government withdrew its motion to find Belfort in default of his payments, after his lawyers argued that he had only been responsible for paying 50% of his salary to restitution until 2009, and not since. The restitution he paid during his parole period (after leaving prison) amounted to $382,910 in 2007, $148,799 in 2008, and $170,000 in 2009. After that period, Belfort began negotiating a restitution payment plan with the U.S. government.

The final deal Belfort made with the government was to pay a minimum of $10,000 per month for life toward the restitution, after a judge ruled that Belfort was not required to pay 50% of his income past the end of his parole. Belfort claimed that he is putting the profits from his U.S. public speaking engagements and media royalties toward the restitution, in addition to the $10,000 per month.

In April 2026, Belfort completed his court-ordered restitution obligation, ending more than two decades of payments stemming from his federal fraud conviction.

Prosecutors also said that he had fled to Australia to avoid taxes and conceal his assets from his victims, but later recanted their statement, which had been given to The Wall Street Journal, by issuing Belfort an official apology and requesting that The Wall Street Journal print a retraction.

Belfort claimed on his Web site and elsewhere that he intended to request that "100% of the royalties" from his books and The Wolf of Wall Street film be turned over to victims, but in June 2014, spokesmen for the U.S. attorney said that Belfort's claim was "not factual", and that he had received money from the initial sale of the film rights that was not entirely put toward his restitution repayment.

BusinessWeek reported that Belfort had paid only $21,000 toward his restitution obligations out of approximately $1.2 million paid to him in connection with the film before its release. Belfort has said that the government refused his offer to put 100% of his book deal money toward his restitution.

=== Cryptocurrency ===
Belfort was previously a skeptic of cryptocurrency, having called bitcoin "frickin' insanity" and "mass delusion". As he learned more about cryptocurrency, and the prices skyrocketed, he changed his mind. Belfort has declined offers to create Wolf-themed non-fungible tokens despite saying that he "could easily make $10 million". He has also said that he is "massively looking forward to regulation" of cryptocurrency. Belfort is an investor in several cryptocurrency start-ups.

== Writing ==
Belfort wrote two memoirs, The Wolf of Wall Street and Catching the Wolf of Wall Street, which have been published in approximately 40 countries and translated into 18 languages. A film based on his books was released in 2013 starring Leonardo DiCaprio (as Belfort), Jonah Hill, and Margot Robbie; the film was written by Terence Winter and directed by Martin Scorsese.

He wrote his first book in the days following his release from prison (after a false start during his sentence, when he wrote and destroyed 130 initial pages). He received a $500,000 advance from Random House, and before its release, a bidding war began for the book's film rights. The former federal prosecutor who led the criminal investigation of Belfort said that he "invented much", that "he aggrandized his importance and reverence for him by others at his firm", and that, "The real Belfort story still includes thousands of victims who lost hundreds of millions of dollars that they never will be repaid."

In 2017, he went on to write Way of the Wolf: Straight Line Selling: Master the Art of Persuasion, Influence, and Success. It details the sales technique he used alongside his team of brokers while operating on Wall Street. In 2023, Belfort released The Wolf of Investing which he claims to be his ultimate strategy for making money on Wall St.

== Motivational speaking ==
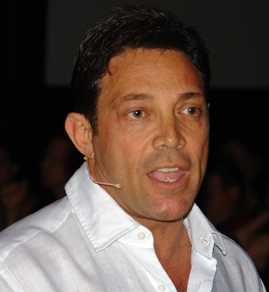
Belfort in 2010

Belfort has given motivational speeches. This has included a tour of live seminars in Australia called "The Truth Behind His Success", in addition to other appearances. In a 60 Minutes interview about his new career, Belfort said of his former life that his "greatest regret is losing people's money". He also runs sales seminars called "Jordan Belfort's Straight Line Sales Psychology". When he first began speaking, he focused largely on motivation and ethics, then moved his focus to sales skills and entrepreneurship.

His speaking engagements are run through his business Global Motivation Inc. and, as of 2014, Belfort was spending three weeks of each month on the road for speaking engagements. The main theme of his speeches includes the importance of business ethics and learning from the mistakes he made during the 1990s—such as believing that he was justified in skirting the rules of financial regulators simply because it was a common thing to do. His per-engagement speaking fees have been about $30,000–75,000, and his per-sales seminar fee can be $80,000 or more.

The main subject matter of his seminars is what he has called "Straight Line System", a system of sales advice. Some reviewers have reacted negatively to the content of the speeches, specifically Belfort's recounting of stories from the 1990s.

== Australian training scandal ==
An investigation led by 7News and The Sunday Mail uncovered links between Belfort and employment company Career Pathways Australia run by Paul Conquest, who also has majority-ownership of Face to Face Training. These two brands were heavily promoted at Belfort workshops held at Brisbane's Eatons Hill Hotel. Belfort reportedly gave two workshops on Sales for the staff of Face to Face Training.

Face to Face Training received $3.9 million from the state government during FY-2014 and $6.34 million during FY-2015 for its training and assessment services. The majority of this money was expected to be spent on service training and certification which did not happen. 9 News Australia called the training program a scam and the certification program a "tick and flick" in its 60 Minutes segment.

== Personal life ==
Belfort married his first wife, Denise Lombardo, in 1985. While running Stratton Oakmont, Belfort and Lombardo were divorced. He later married Nadine Caridi, a British-born, Bay Ridge, Brooklyn-raised model whom he met at a party. He had two children with her. Belfort and Caridi ultimately separated following her claims of domestic violence, which were fueled by his problems with drug addiction and infidelity. They divorced in 2005.

Belfort is an avid tennis player.

Belfort was the final owner of the luxury yacht Nadine, which was originally built for French fashion designer and businesswoman Coco Chanel in 1961. The yacht was renamed after Caridi. In June 1996, the yacht sank off the east coast of Sardinia and frogmen from the Italian Navy special forces unit COMSUBIN rescued all who were aboard the vessel. Belfort said that he insisted on sailing out in high winds against the advice of his captain, resulting in the sinking of the vessel when waves smashed the foredeck hatch.

In 2021, a hacker stole $300,000 in digital tokens from Belfort's cryptocurrency wallet.

=== Politics ===
In the 1990s, Belfort donated $100,000 to the Republican Party and $2,000 to Al D'Amato's reelection campaign in the 1992 United States Senate election in New York. Despite calling himself "a liberal at heart", with "social views [that] are liberal; abortion and stuff like that", Belfort said that in the run-up to the 2016 United States presidential election, he "became very pro-Trump . . . . And then when I saw what happened after he won, I was like‚ 'this country is worse than I thought!'. There's obviously such a problem with the liberals, I'd never seen anything like it." Ultimately Belfort voted for Donald Trump because he agreed with Trump on government size and immigration policy. Despite his support for Trump he has also acknowledged that Trump's rhetoric is divisive. During the 2020 Democratic primaries, he criticized Bernie Sanders and Elizabeth Warren for policy proposals that would affect financial institutions, saying, "What frightens me about a Bernie Sanders or an Elizabeth Warren is like they think that government is the answer but the policies that they're talking about will literally destroy the fabric of the country."

== Works ==
=== Nonfiction ===
Autobiographies

- The Wolf of Wall Street (Bantam, 2007). ISBN 978-0553805468.
- Catching the Wolf of Wall Street: More Incredible True Stories of Fortunes, Schemes, Parties, and Prison (Bantam, 2009). ISBN 978-0553807042.

Self-help

- Way of the Wolf: Become a Master Closer with Straight Line Selling (2017). ISBN 9781501164286.

== Adaptations ==
Filming of Scorsese's adaptation of Belfort's memoirs began in August 2012, and the film was released on December 25, 2013. Time magazine reported that many of the escapades depicted in the film are consistent with Belfort's memoirs and what was written about him in Forbes articles, although some of the Forbes-related content was embellished.

Belfort was portrayed by Leonardo DiCaprio, who won the Golden Globe Award for Best Actor – Motion Picture Musical or Comedy and was nominated for an Academy Award for Best Actor for his performance. Belfort has a cameo in the closing scene of the film as an Auckland Straight Line host.

== In popular culture ==
Belfort appeared in an episode of American Greed (Season 9, episode 8) called "The Real Wolf of Wall Street".

== See also ==
- White-collar crime
