= Chester A. Weidenburner =

American judge

United States Attorney for the District of New Jersey
- In office 1956–1961
- Preceded by: Herman Scott (acting)
- Succeeded by: David M. Satz, Jr.

Personal details
- Born: December 3, 1913 New York City, New York
- Died: December 8, 1985 (aged 72) Elizabeth, New Jersey
- Education: Union Junior College; Duke University; Rutgers Law School

Chester A. Weidenburner (December 3, 1913 – December 8, 1985) was an American lawyer and judge who served as U.S. Attorney for the District of New Jersey and as a Judge of the New Jersey Superior Court.

== Biography ==
Chester Arthur Weidenburner was born in New York City in 1913. He graduated from Linden High School in Linden, New Jersey in 1931 and attended Union Junior College (now Union County College) in Cranford. He went on to attend Duke University and then received an LL.B. degree from Rutgers Law School in 1938. During World War II he served in the United States Army.

Weidenburner served as Secretary of the Speaker of the New Jersey General Assembly in 1948 and as Assembly Parliamentarian in 1949. From 1953 to 1956 he was Assistant Prosecutor of Union County

In October 1956, he was appointed U.S. Attorney for the District of New Jersey. He served until 1961. He went on to serve as Judge for the Union County Court from 1962 to 1966. In September 1966 he was appointed to the New Jersey Superior Court.

Weidenburner retired from the bench in 1978. He died at the Elizabeth General Medical Center in Elizabeth, New Jersey in 1985 at the age of 72.

Legal offices
Preceded by Herman Scott	United States Attorney for the District of New Jersey; 1956 – 1961	Succeeded by David M. Satz, Jr.
