= Donald Horowitz (New Jersey lawyer) =

American lawyer

U.S. Attorney for the District of New Jersey (acting)
- In office 1969–1969
- Preceded by: David M. Satz, Jr.
- Succeeded by: Frederick B. Lacey

Personal details
- Born: November 18, 1936 (age 89) New York City
- Education: Rutgers University; Columbia University School of Law

Donald Horowitz (born November 18, 1936) is an American lawyer who served as the Acting United States Attorney for the District of New Jersey in 1969.

== Biography ==
Horowitz was born in New York City in 1936. He received his A.B. degree from Rutgers University in 1958 and his LL.B. degree from Columbia University School of Law in 1961. He served as law clerk to Milton B. Conford (New Jersey Superior Court Appellate Division) from 1961 to 1962. In 1963 he was named Assistant U.S. Attorney at the U.S. Attorney's Office for the District of New Jersey. He was Chief of the Criminal Division in 1966 and First Assistant in 1968. In 1969 he was Acting U.S. Attorney until the appointment of Frederick B. Lacey by President Richard Nixon. From 1969 to 1970 he served as Special Deputy Attorney General of New Jersey.

Horowitz went into private practice in 1969, as a partner in the law firm of Cummins, Cummins, Dunn, Horowitz, Rosner & Pashman until 1982. He was a sole practitioner in Hackensack, New Jersey from 1982 to 1985, a partner in the Hackensack firm of Horowitz & Jacobs from 1985 to 1989, and principal of the Law Offices of Donald Horowitz in Hackensack from 1989 to the present.

From 1989 to 1998 Horowitz was Master of the Justice Morris Pashman American Inns of Court.
