= Frederick Bernard Lacey =

American judge

Frederick Lacey
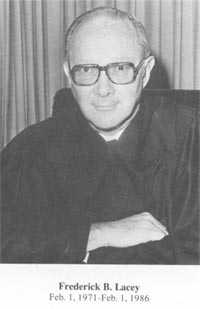

Judge of the United States Foreign Intelligence Surveillance Court
- In office May 19, 1979 – May 18, 1985
- Appointed by: Warren E. Burger
- Preceded by: Seat established
- Succeeded by: Lloyd MacMahon

Judge of the United States District Court for the District of New Jersey
- In office January 26, 1971 – February 3, 1986
- Appointed by: Richard Nixon
- Preceded by: Seat established
- Succeeded by: Alfred James Lechner Jr.

United States Attorney for the District of New Jersey
- In office 1969–1971
- Appointed by: Richard Nixon
- Preceded by: Donald Horowitz (acting)
- Succeeded by: Herbert J. Stern

Personal details
- Born: Frederick Bernard Lacey; September 9, 1920 Newark, New Jersey, U.S.
- Died: April 1, 2017 (aged 96) Naples, Florida, U.S.
- Party: Republican
- Education: Rutgers University (BA); Cornell University (LLB)

Frederick Bernard Lacey (September 9, 1920 – April 1, 2017) was a United States district judge of the United States District Court for the District of New Jersey.

== Education and career ==
Lacey was born in Newark, New Jersey in 1920 to Frederick Robert and Mary Agnes (Armstrong) Lacey. His father served as police chief for Newark. After attending West Side High School, he received an Artium Baccalaureus degree from Rutgers University in 1941, and a Bachelor of Laws from Cornell Law School in 1948. He was a United States Navy Reserve Lieutenant Commander from 1942 to 1946. He married Mary C. Stoneham on May 20, 1944. Lacey was in private practice in New York City, New York from 1948 to 1951; in Newark from 1951 to 1952; and again in New York City from 1952 to 1953. He was an Assistant United States Attorney of the District of New Jersey from 1953 to 1955. In 1954 he led the case that sent the mobster Albert Anastasia to prison for income tax evasion. He returned to private practice as a partner with the law firm of Shanley & Fisher in Newark from 1955 to 1969. In 1969, Lacey was appointed United States Attorney for the District of New Jersey by President Richard Nixon. As U.S. Attorney, his Glen Ridge, New Jersey home was protected by Marshals Service to protect him and his family from death threats. He served until 1971, leading a series of corruption prosecutions against high-profile figures in politics and organized crime, including against Newark Mayor Hugh Joseph Addonizio.

== Federal judicial service ==
On October 7, 1970, Lacey was nominated by President Nixon to a new judgeship on the United States District Court for the District of New Jersey created by 84 Stat. 294. He was confirmed by the United States Senate on October 13, 1970, and received his commission on January 26, 1971. He served on the United States Foreign Intelligence Surveillance Court from 1979 to 1985. Lacey's service was terminated on February 3, 1986, due to his retirement.

== Post judicial service ==
After retiring from the bench Lacey worked for the firm of LeBoeuf, Lamb, Leiby and MacRae. He was appointed a special judicial master overseeing the International Brotherhood of Teamsters. In 1992 he was appointed by United States Attorney General William Barr to investigate whether the Government mishandled a fraud case involving Banca Nazionale del Lavoro. In 2006, he was appointed to be a federal monitor in an investigation of Bristol-Myers Squibb, centering on the distribution of the drug Plavix. The company complied with Lacey's recommendation to remove then CEO Peter R. Dolan.

== Death ==
On April 1, 2017, Lacey died in Naples, Florida at age 96. On April 17, 2017, New Jersey Governor Chris Christie signed an Executive Order directing that both United States and New Jersey flags at state departments, offices, and agencies be flown at half-mast on April 19, 2017, in recognition of Lacey's passing. A funeral mass was held for Lacey was held in Sea Girt, New Jersey, where he had maintained a residence.

== Sources ==
Legal offices
| Preceded by Donald Horowitz | United States Attorney for the District of New Jersey; 1969–1971 | Succeeded by Herbert J. Stern |
| New seat | Judge of the United States District Court for the District of New Jersey; 1971–1986 | Succeeded by Alfred James Lechner Jr. |
| New seat | Judge of the United States Foreign Intelligence Surveillance Court; 1979–1985 | Succeeded by Lloyd MacMahon |
