= Soybean oil =

Type of vegetable oil

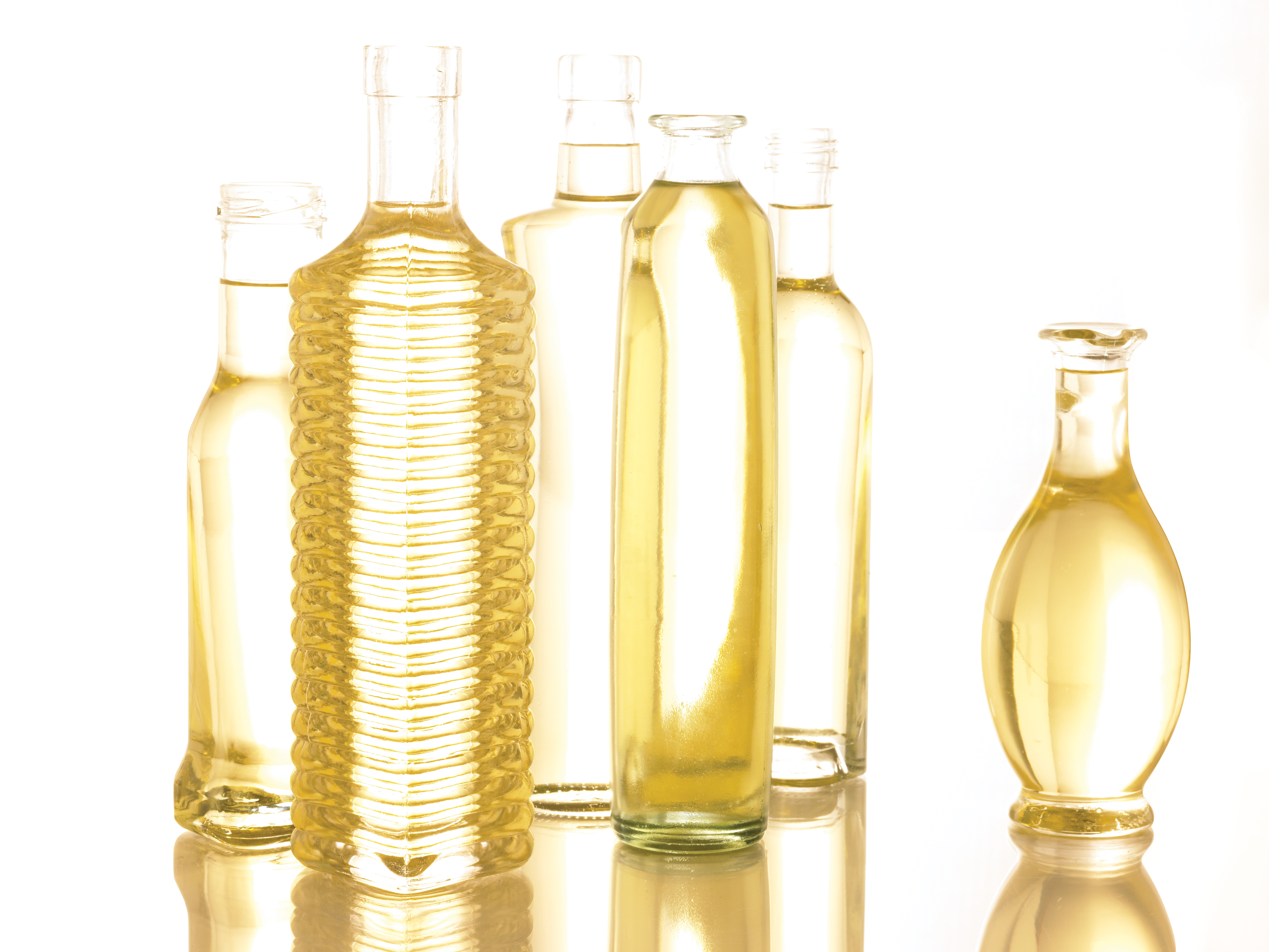
- Bottles of soybean oil

Clinical data
- Trade names: Nutrilipid, Intralipid, others
- AHFS/Drugs.com: Professional Drug Facts
- License data: US DailyMed: Soybean_oil
- Pregnancy category: AU: B3
- Routes of administration: Intravenous (IV)
- ATC code: none

Identifiers
- CAS Number: 8001-22-7
- DrugBank: DB09422
- UNII: 241ATL177A
- CompTox Dashboard (EPA): DTXSID8027660
- ECHA InfoCard: 100.029.340

Soybean oil (British English: soyabean oil) is a vegetable oil extracted from soybean (Glycine max) legumes. It is one of the most widely consumed cooking oils and the second most consumed vegetable oil. As a drying oil, processed soybean oil is also used as a base for printing inks (soy ink) and oil paints.

== Composition ==
Soybean oil contains only trace amounts of fatty carboxylic acids (about 0.3% by mass in the crude oil, and 0.03% in the refined oil). Instead it contains esters. In the following content, the expressions "fatty acids" and "acid" below refer to esters rather than carboxylic acids.

Per 100 g, soybean oil has 16 g of saturated fat, 23 g of monounsaturated fat, and 58 g of polyunsaturated fat. The major unsaturated fatty acids in soybean oil triglycerides are the polyunsaturates alpha-linolenic acid (C-18:3), 7-10%, and linoleic acid (C-18:2), 51%; and the monounsaturate oleic acid (C-18:1), 23%. It also contains the saturated fatty acids stearic acid (C-18:0), 4%, and palmitic acid (C-16:0), 10%.

The high proportion of oxidation-prone polyunsaturated fatty acid is undesirable for some uses, such as cooking oils. Three companies, Monsanto Company, DuPont/Bunge, and Asoyia in 2004 introduced low linolenic Roundup Ready soybeans. Hydrogenation may be used to reduce the unsaturation in linolenic acid. The resulting oil is called hydrogenated soybean oil. If the hydrogenation is only partially complete, the oil may contain small amounts of trans fat.

Trans-fat is also commonly introduced during conventional oil deodorization, with a 2005 review detecting 0.4 to 2.1% trans content in deodorized oil.

== Production ==
Soybean oil production 2023, millions of tonnes
China	17.4
United States	12.2
Brazil	10.9
Argentina	5.3
India	2.1
Mexico	1.0
World	59.9
Source: FAOSTAT of the United Nations

In 2022 China was the main producer of soybean oil, with a share of 29%, and the United States of America in second with a share of 21%.

Production of soybean oil

Yearly per capita supply of soybean oil

=== Manufacturing ===
To produce soybean oil, the soybeans are cracked, adjusted for moisture content, heated to between 60 and 88 °C (140 and 190 °F), rolled into flakes, and solvent-extracted with hexanes. The oil is then refined, blended for different applications, and sometimes hydrogenated. Soybean oils, both liquid and partially hydrogenated are sold as "vegetable oil", or are ingredients in a wide variety of processed foods. Most of the remaining residue (soybean meal) is used as animal feed.

== Applications ==
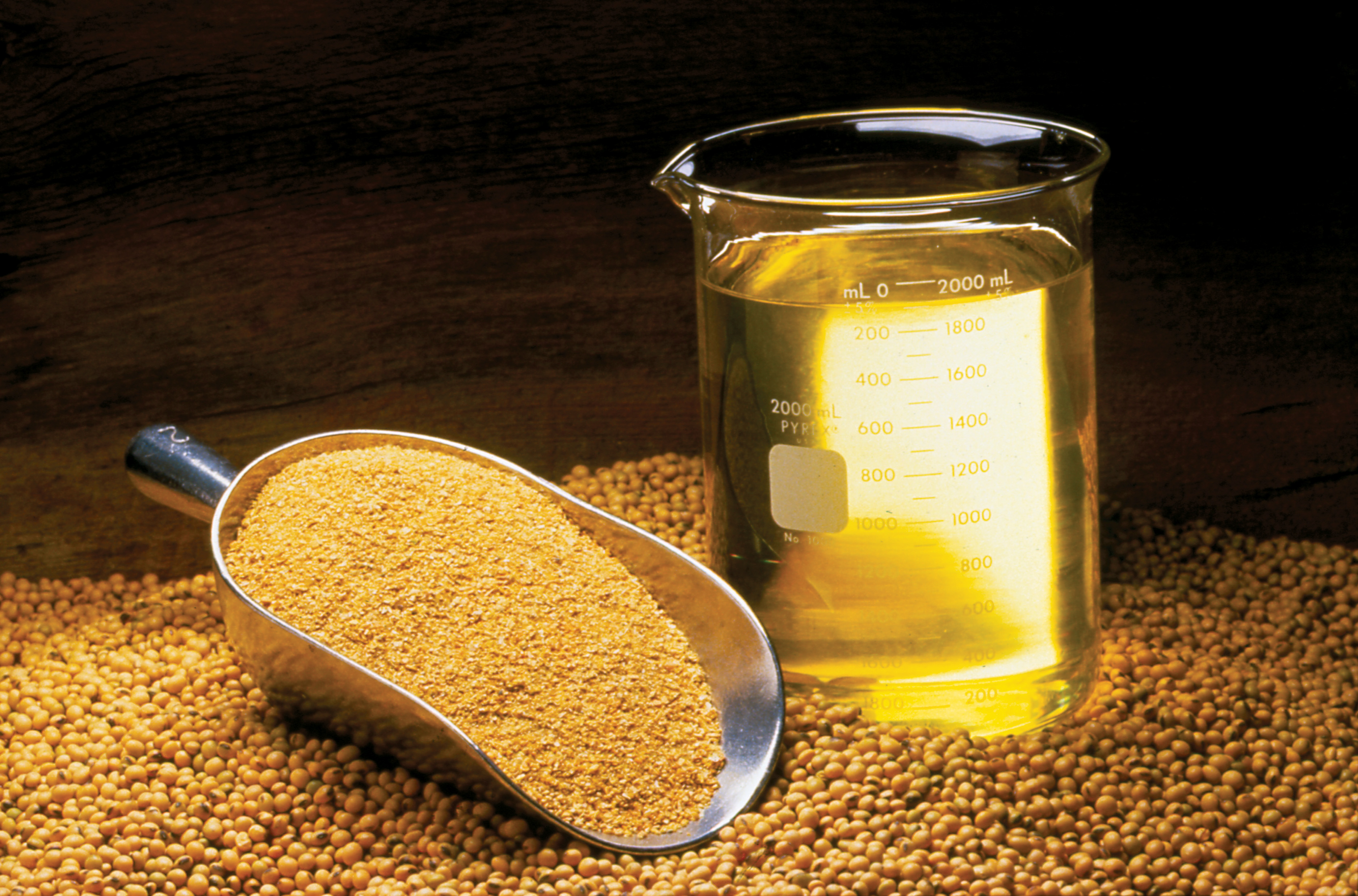
Soybean oil, meal and beans

=== Food ===
Soybean oil is mostly used for frying, cooking, and baking. It is also used as a condiment for salads.

=== Drying oils ===
Soybean oil is one of many drying oils, which means that it will slowly harden (due to free-radical-based polymerization) upon exposure to air, forming a flexible, transparent, and waterproof solid. Because of this property, it is used in some printing ink and oil paint formulations. However, other oils (such as linseed oil) may be superior for some drying oil applications.

=== Medical uses ===
Soybean oil is indicated for parenteral nutrition as a source of calories and essential fatty acids.

=== Fixative for insect repellents ===
While soybean oil has no direct insect repellent activity, it is used as a fixative to extend the short duration of action of essential oils such as geranium oil in several commercial products.

== Trading ==
Soybean oil is one of the most commonly produced vegetable oils.

Soybean oil is traded at the Chicago Board of Trade in contracts of 60,000 pounds (27,000 kilograms) at a time. Prices are listed in cents and thousandths of a cent per pound, with a minimum fluctuation of 5/1000 cents. It has been traded there since 1951. Soybean oil was the central commodity involved in the Salad oil scandal, resulting in total losses of $180 million.

Below are the contract specifications for Bean Oil:

Contract Specifications
Bean Oil (BOA)	
Exchange:	CBOT
Sector:	Grain
Tick Size:	0.01
Tick Value:	6 USD
BPV:	600
Denomination:	USD
Decimal Place:	2

== Sources ==
This article incorporates text from a free content work. Licensed under CC BY 4.0 (license statement/permission). Text taken from World Food and Agriculture – Statistical Yearbook 2025, Food and Agriculture Organization of the United Nations.
