= The Great Salad Oil Swindle =

1965 book by Norman Charles Miller

- First edition
- Author: Norman C. Miller
- Language: English
- Genre: Nonfiction, Business, Economics
- Published: 1965
- Publisher: Coward McCann
- Publication place: United States
- Pages: 256 pp.
- OCLC: 265024
- LC Class: HV6766.D4 M5

The Great Salad Oil Swindle is a book by Wall Street Journal reporter Norman C. Miller about Tino De Angelis, a New Jersey–based wholesaler and commodities trader who dealt in vegetable oil futures contracts. The book was published in 1965 by Coward McCann.

== Overview ==
In 1963, De Angelis was responsible for the Salad Oil scandal, a major financial racket involving fraudulent warehouse receipts, when he attempted to corner the soybean oil market. Soybean oil is an ingredient of salad dressing and has many other uses. In the aftermath of the scandal, 51 investors were swindled out of approximately $175 million ($1.4 billion in 2018 dollars).

== Recognition ==
Miller was awarded the Pulitzer Prize in 1964 for his reporting of the De Angelis scam in the Wall Street Journal, on which the book is based.
