= Norman Charles Miller =

American journalist (1934–2025)

Norman Charles Miller (October 2, 1934 – March 29, 2025) was an American journalist who worked for The Wall Street Journal.

== Life and career ==
Miller was born in Pittsburgh on October 2, 1934. He attended Pennsylvania State University, where he earned his Bachelor of Arts in 1956. Miller won a Pulitzer Prize for Journalism in 1964 for his coverage of the financial fraud scandal of commodities reader Tino De Angelis. Miller's reporting became the basis for his book, The Great Salad Oil Swindle, published in 1965.

He was chief of the Journal's Washington bureau.

Miller died on March 29, 2025, at the age of 90.

== Sources ==
- Miller, Norman C. 1934–. Contemporary Authors. 37–40, First Revision, 391. 1979.
- The Great Salad Oil Swindle (Baltimore, MD: Penguin Books, 1965). by Norman C. Miller
